= Botswana national football team results (2000–2019) =

The Botswana national football team represents Botswana in international football under the control of the Botswana Football Association. Following the independence of Botswana in 1966, the football federation was founded in 1970. It later joined the Confederation of African Football (CAF) in 1976 and FIFA in 1982.

The following list contains all results of Botswana's official matches between the year 2000 and 2019.

== Key ==
The coloured backgrounds denote the result of the match:

– indicates Botswana won the match
– indicates Botswana's opposition won the match
– indicates the match ended in a draw

== Official results ==
=== 2000 ===
27 February 2000 Friendly	Botswana	1–0	Lesotho	Gaborone, Botswana
	Mogogi Gabonamong	Report		Stadium: Botswana National Stadium

19 March 2000 Friendly	Botswana	3–0	Swaziland	Gaborone, Botswana
	Dipsy Selolwane 32', 70'; Phineas Maimela 86'	Report		Stadium: Botswana National Stadium

25 March 2000 Friendly	Zambia	3–0	Botswana	Lusaka, Zambia
	Mark Sinyangwe 7'; Harry Milanzi 32'; Chaswe Nsofwa 89'	Report		Stadium: Independence Stadium

8 April 2000 2002 FIFA WC qualification	Botswana	0–1	Zambia	Gaborone, Botswana
		Report	Dennis Lota 40'	Stadium: Botswana National Stadium

22 April 2000 2002 FIFA WC qualification	Zambia	1–0	Botswana	Lusaka, Zambia
	Harry Milanzi 83'	Report		Stadium: Independence Stadium

1 June 2000 Friendly	Mozambique	0–2	Botswana	Lobamba, Eswatini
		Report		Stadium: Somhlolo National Stadium

2 June 2000 Friendly	Swaziland	0–0	Botswana	Lobamba, Eswatini
		Report		Stadium: Somhlolo National Stadium

4 June 2000 Friendly	Lesotho	1–1	Botswana	Lobamba, Eswatini
		Report	Dipsy Selolwane 20'	Stadium: Somhlolo National Stadium

1 July 2000 2002 AFCON qualification	Botswana	1–0	Madagascar	Gaborone, Botswana
	Dipsy Selolwane 25'	Report		Stadium: National Stadium; Attendance: 15,000

15 July 2000 2002 AFCON qualification	Madagascar	2–0	Botswana	Antananarivo, Madagasgar
	Harry Randrianaivo 3'; Claude Ralaitafika 48'	Report		Stadium: Mahamasina Municipal Stadium

=== 2001 ===
27 January 2001 Friendly	Botswana	1–2	Swaziland	Gaborone, Botswana
		Report		Stadium: Botswana National Stadium

28 January 2001 Friendly	Botswana	2–1	Lesotho	Gaborone, Botswana
		Report		Stadium: Botswana National Stadium

10 March 2001 Friendly	Swaziland	0–1	Botswana	Maseru, Lesotho
		Report		Stadium: Setsoto Stadium

11 March 2001 Friendly	Mozambique	3–1	Botswana	Maseru, Lesotho
		Report		Stadium: Setsoto Stadium

17 March 2001 2001 COSAFA Cup	Botswana	0–1	Malawi	Gaborone, Botswana
		Report	Essau Kanyenda 75'	Stadium: Botswana National Stadium

15 December 2001 Friendly	Botswana	3–2	Namibia	Gaborone, Botswana
		Report	Gervatius Urikhob 12', 65'	Stadium: Botswana National Stadium

16 December 2001 Friendly	Botswana	1–0	Lesotho	Gaborone, Botswana
	Oliver Pikati	Report		Stadium: Botswana National Stadium

=== 2002 ===
2 March 2002 Friendly	Swaziland	2–6	Botswana	Lobamba, Eswatini
	Mxolisi Mthethwa 10'; Wonder Nhleko	Report	Shimane Kgope Ntshweu 3', 46'; Innocent Ranku 17'; Tshepiso Molwantwa 31'; Oliver Pikati,	Stadium: Somhlolo National Stadium

16 March 2002 Friendly	Botswana	3–1	Namibia	Gaborone, Botswana
	Steve Mbemukenga 14' (o.g.); Ditaola Ditaola 46'; Nelson Gabolwelwe 87'	Report	Philemon Angula	Stadium: Botswana National Stadium

30 March 2002 2002 COSAFA Cup	Botswana	0–0 (4–5 p)	South Africa	Gaborone, Botswana
		Report		Stadium: Botswana National Stadium

8 June 2002 Friendly	Malawi	2–0	Botswana	Blantyre, Malawi
	Jones Nkhwazi; Peter Mponda 65'	Report		Stadium: Kamuzu Stadium

9 June 2002 Friendly	Malawi	1–0	Botswana	Lilongwe, Malawi
	Essau Kanyenda 83'	Report		Stadium: Silver Stadium

26 August 2002 Friendly	Botswana	0–1	Lesotho	Gaborone, Botswana
		Report	Motlatsi Shale 30'	Stadium: Botswana National Stadium

7 September 2002 2002 AFCON qualification	Botswana	0–0	Swaziland	Gaborone, Botswana
		Report		Stadium: Botswana National Stadium; Referee: Samuel Moeketsi (Lesotho)

13 October 2002 2002 AFCON qualification	DR Congo	2–0	Botswana	Kinshasa, Democratic Republic of the Congo
	Lomana LuaLua 6'; Marlin Piana 21'	Report		Stadium: Stade des Martyrs; Attendance: 100,000; Referee: Joseph Mandzioukouta (Congo)

14 December 2002 Friendly	Botswana	1–0	Zambia	Gaborone, Botswana
	Dipsy Selolwane 20'	Report		Stadium: Botswana National Stadium

=== 2003 ===
9 March 2003 Friendly	Botswana	0–1	Lesotho	Gaborone, Botswana
		Report	Paballo Mpakanyane 13'	Stadium: Botswana National Stadium

16 March 2003 2003 COSAFA Cup	Namibia	0–1	Botswana	Windhoek, Namibia
		Report	Tshepiso Molwantwa 4'	Stadium: Independence Stadium

16 May 2003 Friendly	Lesotho	1–2	Botswana	Maseru, Lesotho
	???	Report	Masego Ntshingane,	Stadium: Setsoto Stadium

16 March 2003 2003 COSAFA Cup	Botswana	1–1 (1–4 p)	Malawi	Gaborone, Botswana
	Masego Ntshingane 21'	Report	Moses Chavula 87'	Stadium: Botswana National Stadium

30 March 2003 2003 AFCON qualification	Libya	0–0	Botswana	Benghazi, Libya
		Report		Stadium: March 28 Stadium; Referee: Pare Passina (Burkina Faso)

7 June 2003 2003 AFCON qualification	Botswana	0–1	Libya	Gaborone, Botswana
		Report	Ahmed Al Masli 89'	Stadium: Botswana National Stadium; Referee: Nunkoo Rajanand (Mauritius)

10 June 2003 Friendly	Botswana	0–0	Trinidad and Tobago	Gaborone, Botswana
		Report		Stadium: Botswana National Stadium

22 June 2003 2003 AFCON qualification	Swaziland	3–2	Botswana	Lobamba, Eswatini
	Siza Dlamini 7', 25'; Sibusiso Dlamini 18'	Report	Michael Mogaladi 41'; Pius Kolagano 56'	Stadium: Somhlolo National Stadium; Attendance: 10,000

5 July 2003 2003 AFCON qualification	Botswana	0–0	DR Congo	Gaborone, Botswana
		Report		Stadium: Botswana National Stadium

6 September 2003 Friendly	Swaziland	0–3	Botswana	Lobamba, Eswatini
		Report	Tshepiso Molwantwa; ???; ???	Stadium: Somhlolo National Stadium

11 October 2003 2006 FIFA WC qualification	Botswana	4–1	Lesotho	Gaborone, Botswana
15:00 UTC+02:00	Tshepiso Molwantwa 7'; Nelson Gabolwelwe 44'; Diphetogo Selolwane 50', 53'	Report	Moses Ramafole 64'	Stadium: Botswana National Stadium; Attendance: 10,000; Referee: Luis Manuel Joao (Angola)

16 November 2003 2006 FIFA WC qualification	Lesotho	0–0	Botswana	Maseru, Lesotho
15:00 UTC+02:00		Report		Stadium: Setsoto Stadium; Attendance: 9,000; Referee: Harris Shikapande (Zambia)

13 December 2003 Friendly	Botswana	0–2	Zimbabwe	Selebi-Phikwe, Botswana
		Report	Francis Chandida 30'; Sageby Sandaka 80'	Stadium: Selebi-Phikwe Stadium

=== 2004 ===
28 February 2004 2004 COSAFA Cup	Lesotho	0–0 (10–11 p)	Botswana	Maseru, Lesotho
		Report		Stadium: Setsoto Stadium

28 April 2004 Friendly	Namibia	0–0	Botswana	Windhoek, Namibia
		Report		Stadium: Independence Stadium

26 May 2004 Friendly	Mozambique	0–0	Botswana	Matola, Mozambique
		Report		Stadium: Estádio da Machava

5 June 2004 2006 FIFA WC qualification	Tunisia	4–1	Botswana	Tunis, Tunisia
19:15	José Clayton 9'; Karim Haggui 35', 79'; Ali Zitouni 74'	Report	Dipsy Selolwane 65'	Stadium: Stade 7 November; Attendance: 2,844; Referee: Khalid Abdel Rahman (Sudan)

19 June 2004 2006 FIFA WC qualification	Botswana	2–0	Malawi	Gaborone, Botswana
15:00	Dipsy Selolwane 7'; Nelson Gabolwelwe 25'	Report		Stadium: Botswana National Stadium; Attendance: 15,000; Referee: Yusuf Awuye (Uganda)

3 July 2004 2006 FIFA WC qualification	Botswana	0–1	Morocco	Gaborone, Botswana
15:00		Report	Youssef Mokhtari 30'	Stadium: Botswana National Stadium; Attendance: 22,000; Referee: Gilbert Dlamini (Swaziland)

18 July 2004 2004 COSAFA Cup	Angola	1–1 (5–3 p)	Botswana	Luanda, Angola
	Flávio Amado 4'	Report	Tshepo Motlhabankwe 24'	Stadium: Estádio da Cidadela

18 August 2004 Friendly	Zimbabwe	2–0	Botswana	Bulawayo, Zimbabwe
	Njabulo Ncube 67'; Ronald Sibanda 87'	Report		Stadium: Barbourfields Stadium

3 September 2004 2006 FIFA WC qualification	Guinea	4–0	Botswana	Conakry, Guinea
16:30	Pascal Feindouno 44'; Souleymane Youla 54'; Kaba Diawara 60'; Fodé Mansaré 82'	Report		Stadium: Stade 28 Septembre; Attendance: 25,000; Referee: Justus Agbenyega (Ghana)

30 September 2004 Friendly	Botswana	1–0	Zambia	Gaborone, Botswana
	Mogogi Gabonamong 13'	Report		Stadium: Botswana National Stadium

9 October 2004 2006 FIFA WC qualification	Botswana	2–1	Kenya	Gaborone, Botswana
16:00	Tshepiso Molwantwa 51'; Dipsy Selolwane 58'	Report	Dennis Oliech 5'	Stadium: Botswana National Stadium; Attendance: 16,500; Referee: Eugenio Colembi (Angola)

15 December 2004 Friendly	Lesotho	1–1	Botswana	Maseru, Lesotho
	???	Report	???	Stadium: Setsoto Stadium

=== 2005 ===
26 February 2005 Friendly	Botswana	0–0	Zambia	Gaborone, Botswana
		Report		Stadium: Botswana National Stadium

16 March 2005 Friendly	Zimbabwe	1–1	Botswana	Harare, Zimbabwe
	Cephas Chimedza 53'	Report	Moemedi Moatlhaping 72'	Stadium: Rufaro Stadium

26 March 2005 2006 FIFA WC qualification	Kenya	1–0	Botswana	Nairobi, Kenya
16:00	Dennis Oliech 44'	Report		Stadium: Moi International Sports Centre; Attendance: 15,000; Referee: Buenkadila Wabelo Bisingu (Congo DR)

16 April 2005 2005 COSAFA Cup	Namibia	1–1 (1–2 p)	Botswana	Windhoek, Namibia
	Henrico Botes 35'	Report	Moemedi Moatlhaping 90'	Stadium: Independence Stadium

17 April 2005 2005 COSAFA Cup	Zimbabwe	2–0	Botswana	Windhoek, Namibia
	Brian Badza 21'; Sageby Sandaka 58'	Report		Stadium: Independence Stadium

4 June 2005 2006 FIFA WC qualification	Botswana	1–3	Tunisia	Gaborone, Botswana
15:00	Mogogi Gabonamong 12'	Report	Mehdi Nafti 27'; Francileudo Santos 43'; Wisam El Abdy 78'	Stadium: Botswana National Stadium; Attendance: 20,000; Referee: Sule Mana (Nigeria)

18 June 2005 2006 FIFA WC qualification	Malawi	1–3	Botswana	Blantyre, Malawi
15:00	Russel Mwafulirwa 48'	Report	Tshepiso Molwantwa 8'; Diphetogo Selolwane 40'; Tshepo Motlhabankwe 88'	Stadium: Kamuzu Stadium; Attendance: 20,000; Referee: Divine Evehe (Cameroon)

1 July 2005 Friendly	Botswana	0–0	DR Congo	Gaborone, Botswana
		Report		Stadium: Botswana National Stadium

9 August 2005 Friendly	Angola	0–0	Botswana	Johannesburg, South Africa
		Report

10 August 2005 Friendly	Angola	0–0	Botswana	Johannesburg, South Africa
		Report

3 September 2005 2006 FIFA WC qualification	Morocco	1–0	Botswana	Rabat, Morocco
20:00	Talal El Karkouri 56'	Report		Stadium: Stade Moulay Abdellah; Attendance: 25,000; Referee: Mohamed Benouza (Algeria)

8 October 2005 2006 FIFA WC qualification	Botswana	1–2	Guinea	Gaborone, Botswana
16:00	Tshepiso Molwantwa 35'	Report	Ousmane Bangoura 73', 76'	Stadium: Botswana National Stadium; Attendance: 16,800; Referee: Modou Sowe (Gambia)

=== 2006 ===
14 May 2006 Friendly	Botswana	0–0	Zambia	Gaborone, Botswana
		Report		Stadium: University of Botswana Stadium

20 May 2006 2006 COSAFA Cup	Botswana	2–0	Madagascar	Gaborone, Botswana
	Moemedi Moatlhaping 66'; Khumo Motlhabane 68'	Report		Stadium: Botswana National Stadium

21 May 2006 2006 COSAFA Cup	Botswana	0–0 (6–5 p)	South Africa	Gaborone, Botswana
		Report		Stadium: Botswana National Stadium

6 July 2006 Friendly	Malawi	2–1	Botswana	Lilongwe, Malawi
	Peter Wadabwa 46'; Jimmy Zakazaka 58'	Report	Pontsho Moloi 38'	Stadium: Civo Stadium

8 July 2006 Friendly	Malawi	0–0 (2–3 p)	Botswana	Blantyre, Malawi
		Report		Stadium: Kamuzu Stadium

6 August 2006 Friendly	Uganda	0–0	Botswana	Kampala, Uganda
		Report		Stadium: Nakivubo Stadium

19 August 2006 2006 COSAFA Cup	Zambia	1–0	Botswana	Lusaka, Zambia
	Given Singuluma 52'	Report		Stadium: Independence Stadium

3 September 2006 2008 AFCON qualification	Mauritania	4–0	Botswana	Nouakchott, Mauritania
	Saidou Mbodjj 2'; Karamoko Moussa 10', 23'; Yoann Langlet 31'	Report		Stadium: Stade Olympique

3 October 2006 Friendly	Botswana	1–0	Lesotho	Gaborone, Botswana
	Moemedi Moatlhaping	Report		Stadium: Botswana National Stadium

7 October 2006 2008 AFCON qualification	Botswana	0–0	Egypt	Gaborone, Botswana
		Report		Stadium: Botswana National Stadium

15 November 2006 Friendly	Botswana	1–0	Swaziland	Gaborone, Botswana
	Jerome Ramatlhakwane 19'	Report		Stadium: Botswana National Stadium

=== 2007 ===
7 February 2007 Friendly	Botswana	1–0	Namibia	Gaborone, Botswana
	Pontsho Moloi 51'	Report		Stadium: Botswana National Stadium

25 March 2007 2008 AFCON qualification	Botswana	1–0	Burundi	Gaborone, Botswana
	Thato Siska 65'	Report		Stadium: Botswana National Stadium

27 May 2007 Friendly	Botswana	0–0	Libya	Gaborone, Botswana
		Report		Stadium: Botswana National Stadium

3 June 2007 2008 AFCON qualification	Burundi	1–0	Botswana	Kigali, Rwanda
	Abdul Hakimana 63'	Report		Stadium: Stade Amahoro

16 June 2007 2008 AFCON qualification	Botswana	2–1	Mauritania	Gaborone, Botswana
	Modiri Marumo 19'; Dipsy Selolwane 40'	Report	Yoann Langlet 75'	Stadium: Botswana National Stadium

21 July 2007 Friendly	Botswana	0–0	Zambia	Orapa, Botswana
		Report		Stadium: Itekeng Stadium

28 July 2007 2007 COSAFA Cup	Botswana	1–0	Namibia	Gaborone, Botswana
	Michael Mogaladi 19'	Report		Stadium: Botswana National Stadium

29 July 2007 2007 COSAFA Cup	Botswana	0–0 (3–1 p)	Angola	Gaborone, Botswana
		Report		Stadium: Botswana National Stadium

29 September 2007 2007 COSAFA Cup	South Africa	1–0	Botswana	Atteridgeville, South Africa
	Teko Modise 32'	Report		Stadium: Lucas Masterpieces Moripe Stadium

13 October 2007 2008 AFCON qualification	Egypt	1–0	Botswana	Cairo, Egypt
	Mohamed Fadl 77'	Report		Stadium: Cairo International Stadium

=== 2008 ===
16 January 2008 Friendly	South Africa	2–1	Botswana	Umlazi, South Africa
	Bryce Moon 44'; Sibusiso Zuma 81'	Report	Moemedi Moatlhaping 55'	Stadium: King Zwelithini Stadium

9 February 2008 Friendly	Swaziland	1–4	Botswana	Lobamba, Eswatini
	Tony Tsabedze 77'	Report	Jerome Ramatlhakwane 21', 45'; Moemedi Moatlhaping 54'; Pontsho Moloi 73'	Stadium: Somhlolo National Stadium

26 March 2008 Friendly	Botswana	0–1	Zimbabwe	Gaborone, Botswana
		Report	Cuthbert Malajila 49'	Stadium: Botswana National Stadium

31 May 2008 2010 FIFA WC qualification	Botswana	0–0	Madagascar	Gaborone, Botswana
15:00 UTC+2		Report		Stadium: Botswana National Stadium; Attendance: 11,087; Referee: Wellington Kaoma (Zambia)

8 June 2008 2010 FIFA WC qualification	Mozambique	1–2	Botswana	Maputo, Mozambique
15:00 UTC+2	Almiro Lobo 60'	Report	Diphetogo Selolwane 20'; Boitumelo Mafoko 80'	Stadium: Estádio da Machava; Attendance: 30,000; Referee: Mbongseni Fakudze (Swaziland)

14 June 2008 2010 FIFA WC qualification	Botswana	1–1	Ivory Coast	Gaborone, Botswana
15:00 UTC+2	Diphetogo Selolwane 25'		Kanga Akalé 64'	Stadium: Botswana National Stadium; Attendance: 21,400; Referee: Muhmed Ssegonga (Uganda)

22 June 2008 2010 FIFA WC qualification	Ivory Coast	4–0	Botswana	Abidjan, Ivory Coast
16:00 UTC+0	Boubacar Sanogo 16'; Didier Zokora 21'; Sekou Cissé 46', 70'	Report		Stadium: Stade Félix Houphouët-Boigny; Attendance: 15,000; Referee: Kacem Bennaceur (Tunisia)

27 July 2008 2008 COSAFA Cup	Mozambique	2–0	Botswana	Secunda, South Africa
	Momed Hagi 18'; Nito Txuma 90+'	Report		Stadium: Lilian Ngoyi Stadium

20 August 2008 Friendly	Zimbabwe	1–0	Botswana	Harare, Zimbabwe
	Edward Sadomba 40'	Report		Stadium: Rufaro Stadium

30 August 2008 Friendly	Botswana	1–0	Lesotho	Gaborone, Botswana
	Dipsy Selolwane	Report		Stadium: Botswana National Stadium

7 September 2008 2010 FIFA WC qualification	Madagascar	1–0	Botswana	Antananarivo, Madagascar
14:30 UTC+3	Stephan Rabemananjara 18'	Report		Stadium: Mahamasina Municipal Stadium; Attendance: 20,000; Referee: Rajindraparsad Seechurn (Mauritius)

11 October 2008 2010 FIFA WC qualification	Botswana	0–1	Mozambique	Gaborone, Botswana
16:30 UTC+2		Report	Eugenio Fernando Bila 6'	Stadium: Botswana National Stadium; Attendance: 2,000; Referee: Cheikh Ahmed Tidane Seck (Senegal)

=== 2009 ===
21 March 2009 Friendly	Namibia	0–0	Botswana	Keetmanshoop, Namibia
		Report		Stadium: J. Stephanus Stadium

1 April 2009 Friendly	Lesotho	0–0	Botswana	Maseru, Lesotho
		Report		Stadium: Setsoto Stadium

6 June 2009 Friendly	Botswana	0–0	New Zealand	Gaborone, Botswana
		Report		Stadium: Botswana National Stadium

5 July 2009 Friendly	Botswana	1–1	Iran	Gaborone, Botswana
	Mokgathi Mokgathi 30'	Report	Shahriar Shirvand 3'	Stadium: University of Botswana Stadium

30 September 2009 Friendly	China	4–1	Botswana	Hohhot, China
	Gao Lin 29'; Qu Bo 53'; Zhao Peng 54'; Yu Hai 59'	Report	Mokgathi Mokgathi 70'	Stadium: Hohhot People's Stadium

18 October 2009 2009 COSAFA Cup	Comoros	0–0	Botswana	Bulawayo, Zimbabwe
13:30		Report		Stadium: Barbourfields Stadium; Referee: Jose Rachide (Mozambique)

20 October 2009 2009 COSAFA Cup	Swaziland	0–1	Botswana	Bulawayo, Zimbabwe
13:30		Report	Mosimanegape Ramoshibidu 55'	Stadium: Barbourfields Stadium; Referee: Rajindraparsad Seechurn (Mauritius)

22 October 2009 2009 COSAFA Cup	Seychelles	0–2	Botswana	Bulawayo, Zimbabwe
15:30		Report	Pontsho Moloi 6'; Malepa Bolelang 36'	Stadium: Barbourfields Stadium; Referee: Rajindraparsad Seechurn (Mauritius)

26 October 2009 2009 COSAFA Cup	Zimbabwe	1–0	Botswana	Bulawayo, Zimbabwe
15:30	Mthulisi Maphosa 88'	Report		Stadium: Barbourfields Stadium; Referee: Helder Martins de Carvalho (Angola)

=== 2010 ===
3 March 2010 Friendly	Mozambique	0–1	Botswana	Matola, Mozambique
		Report	Michael Mogaladi 8' (pen.)	Stadium: Estádio da Machava

21 March 2010 Friendly	Namibia	0–0	Botswana	Windhoek, Namibia
		Report		Stadium: Hage Geingob Rugby Stadium

1 July 2010 2012 AFCON qualification	Tunisia	0–1	Botswana	Tunis, Tunisia
19:15 UTC+1		Report	Jerome Ramatlhakwane 31'	Stadium: Stade El Menzah; Referee: Badara Diatta (Senegal)

9 July 2010 2012 AFCON qualification	Botswana	1–0	Chad	Gaborone, Botswana
15:00 UTC+2	Phenyo Mongala 50'	Report		Stadium: Botswana National Stadium; Referee: Rajindraparsad Seechurn (Mauritius)

4 August 2010 Friendly	Botswana	2–0	Zimbabwe	Selebi-Phikwe, Botswana
	Mokgathi Mokgathi 9'; Jerome Ramatlhakwane 14'	Report		Stadium: Selebi-Phikwe Stadium

11 August 2010 2012 AFCON qualification	Malawi	1–1	Botswana	Blantyre, Malawi
16:00 UTC+2	Davi Banda 74'	Report	Jerome Ramatlhakwane 63'	Stadium: Kamuzu Stadium; Referee: Hélder Martins de Carvalho (Angola)

4 September 2010 2012 AFCON qualification	Botswana	2–1	Togo	Gaborone, Botswana
15:00 UTC+2	Joel Mogorosi 8'; Jerome Ramatlhakwane 56'	Report	Serge Gakpé 49'	Stadium: University of Botswana Stadium; Referee: Issa Kagaso (Rwanda)

12 October 2010 Friendly	Equatorial Guinea	0–2	Botswana	Malabo, Equatorial Guinea
		Report	Phenyo Mongala 67'; Mogogi Gabonamong 71'	Stadium: Estadio de Malabo

27 October 2010 Friendly	Botswana	2–0	Swaziland	Gaborone, Botswana
	Pontsho Moloi; Mompati Thuma	Report		Stadium: University of Botswana Stadium

17 November 2010 2012 AFCON qualification	Botswana	1–0	Tunisia	Gaborone, Botswana
	Jerome Ramatlhakwane 48'	Report		Stadium: University of Botswana Stadium

=== 2011 ===
19 January 2011 Friendly	Sweden	2–1	Botswana	Cape Town, South Africa
	Alexander Gerndt 31'; Anders Svensson 74'	Report	Joel Mogorosi 47'	Stadium: Cape Town Stadium

9 February 2011 Friendly	Mozambique	1–1	Botswana	Matola, Mozambique
	Hélder Pelembe 55'	Report	Moemedi Moatlhaping 35'	Stadium: Estádio da Machava

16 March 2011 Friendly	Botswana	1–1	Namibia	Maun, Botswana
	Lemponye Tshireletso 65'	Report	Eslin Kamuhanga 33'	Stadium: Maun Sports Stadium

26 March 2011 2012 AFCON qualification	Chad	0–1	Botswana	N'Djamena, Chad
16:00 UTC+1		Report	Jerome Ramatlhakwane 50'	Stadium: Stade National

30 March 2011 Friendly	Morocco	1–1	Botswana	Marrakesh, Morocco
	Hassan Taïr 48' (pen.)	Report	Moemedi Moatlhaping 71' (pen.)	Stadium: Marrakesh Stadium

25 May 2011 Friendly	Lesotho	0–0	Botswana	Manzini, Eswatini
		Report		Stadium: Trade Fair Ground

5 June 2011 2012 AFCON qualification	Botswana	0–0	Malawi	Gaborone, Botswana
15:00 UTC+2		Report		Stadium: University of Botswana Stadium

31 July 2011 Friendly	Swaziland	0–2	Botswana	Pretoria, South Africa
		Report	Onalethata Tshekiso 29'; Bakang Moeng 88'	Stadium: High Performance Centre

10 August 2011 Friendly	Botswana	1–0	Kenya	Gaborone, Botswana
	Moemedi Moatlhaping 87' (pen.)	Report		Stadium: Botswana National Stadium

30 August 2011 Friendly	Botswana	1–2	Lesotho	Molepolole, Botswana
	???	Report	Thulo Ranchobe; Lehlomela Ramabele	Stadium: Molepolole Stadium

4 September 2011 2012 AFCON qualification	Togo	1–0	Botswana	Lomé, Togo
15:30 UTC±00:00	Kondo Arimiyaou 24'	Report		Stadium: Stade de Kégué; Referee: Noumandiez Doué (Ivory Coast)

12 November 2011 Friendly	Nigeria	0–0	Botswana	Abuja, Nigeria
		Report		Stadium: Moshood Abiola National Stadium

15 November 2011 Friendly	Niger	1–1	Botswana	Niamey, Niger
		Report		Stadium: Stade Général Seyni Kountché

21 December 2011 Friendly	Lesotho	0–3	Botswana	Niamey, Niger
		Report	Pontsho Moloi; Jerome Ramatlhakwane,	Stadium: Stade Général Seyni Kountché

=== 2012 ===
7 January 2012 Friendly	Botswana	0–0	Zimbabwe	Gaborone, Botswana
		Report		Stadium: Botswana National Stadium

24 January 2012 2012 AFCON	Ghana	1–0	Botswana	Franceville, Gabon
17:00	John Mensah 25'	Report		Stadium: Stade de Franceville; Attendance: 5,000; Referee: Badara Diatta (Senegal)

28 January 2012 2012 AFCON	Guinea	6–1	Botswana	Franceville, Gabon
17:00	Sadio Diallo 15', 27'; Abdoul Camara 42'; Ibrahima Traoré 45'; Mamadou Bah 83'; Naby Soumah 86'	Report	Dipsy Selolwane 23' (pen.)	Stadium: Stade de Franceville; Attendance: 4,000; Referee: Bouchaïb El Ahrach (Morocco)

1 February 2012 2012 AFCON	Mali	2–1	Botswana	Libreville, Gabon
19:00	Garra Dembélé 56'; Seydou Keita 75'	Report	Mogakolodi Ngele 50'	Stadium: Stade d'Angondjé; Attendance: 20,000; Referee: Khalid Abdel Rahman (Sudan)

23 May 2012 Friendly	Botswana	3–0	Lesotho	Gaborone, Botswana
	Joel Mogorosi 1'; Kekaetswe Moloi 35'; Jerome Ramatlhakwane 89'	Report		Stadium: University of Botswana Stadium

28 May 2012 Friendly	Iraq	1–1	Botswana	Istanbul, Turkey
	Karrar Jassim Al-Mahmoudi 5'	Report	Lemponye Tshireletso 90+1'	Stadium: Atatürk Olympic Stadium

2 June 2012 2014 FIFA WC qualification	Central African Republic	2–0	Botswana	Bangui, Central African Republic
15:00 UTC+1	Foxi Kéthévoama 19', 49'	Report		Stadium: Barthelemy Boganda Stadium; Attendance: 20,000; Referee: Bernard Camille (Seychelles)

9 June 2012 2014 FIFA WC qualification	Botswana	1–1	South Africa	Gaborone, Botswana
15:00 UTC+2	Ofentse Nato 38'	Report	Morgan Gould 14'	Stadium: University of Botswana Stadium; Attendance: 7,500; Referee: Mahamadou Keita (Mali)

12 July 2012 Friendly	Kenya	3–1	Botswana	Nairobi, Kenya
	Clifton Miheso 49', 54'; Raphael Paul Muigai Kiongera 69'	Report	Tebogo Sembowa 19'	Stadium: Nyayo National Stadium

16 July 2012 Friendly	Botswana	1–0	Zimbabwe	Molepolole, Botswana
	Tebogo Sembowa 50'	Report		Stadium: Molepolole Stadium

18 July 2012 Friendly	Botswana	0–0	Lesotho	Molepolole, Botswana
		Report		Stadium: Molepolole Stadium

15 August 2012 Friendly	Botswana	3–3	Tanzania	Molepolole, Botswana
	Lemponye Tshireletso 26', 37'; Michael Mogaladi 69'	Report	Erasto Nyoni 17' (pen.); Mwinyi Kazimoto 31'; Mrisho Ngassa 84'	Stadium: Molepolole Stadium

26 August 2012 Friendly	Botswana	0–0	Uganda	Molepolole, Botswana
		Report		Stadium: Molepolole Stadium

8 September 2012 2013 AFCON qualification	Mali	3–0	Botswana	Bamako, Mali
17:00 UTC±0	Cheick Diabaté 27' (pen.); Mahamadou N'Diaye 59'; Modibo Maïga 77'	Report		Stadium: Stade 26 Mars; Referee: Slim Jedidi (Tunisia)

13 October 2012 2013 AFCON qualification	Botswana	1–4	Mali	Lobatse, Botswana
15:00 UTC+2	Mmusa Ohilwe 90'	Report	Cheick Diabaté 29'; Modibo Maïga 60'; Mamadou Samassa 77'; Mohamed Kalilou Traoré 85'	Stadium: Lobatse Stadium; Referee: Hamada Nampiandraza (Madagascar)

=== 2013 ===
6 February 2013 Friendly	Zimbabwe	2–1	Botswana	Harare, Zimbabwe
	Khama Billiat 18'; Denver Mukamba 26'	Report	Lemponye Tshireletso 5'	Stadium: Rufaro Stadium

19 March 2013 Friendly	Botswana	1–0	Malawi	Gaborone, Botswana
	Jackie Mothatego 35'	Report		Stadium: University of Botswana Stadium

24 March 2013 2014 FIFA WC qualification	Ethiopia	1–0	Botswana	Addis Ababa, Ethiopia
16:00 UTC+3	Getaneh Kebede 89'	Report		Stadium: Addis Ababa Stadium; Attendance: 22,000; Referee: Rédouane Jiyed (Morocco)

4 June 2013 Friendly	Egypt	1–1	Botswana	Cairo, Egypt
	Ahmed Hegazy 37'	Report	Jerome Ramatlhakwane 5'	Stadium: 30 June Stadium

8 June 2013 2014 FIFA WC qualification	Botswana	3–0; Awarded (Note: FIFA awarded Botswana a 3–0 win as a result of Ethiopia fielding the ineligible player Minyahile Beyene. The match originally ended 2–1 to Ethiopia.)	Ethiopia	Lobatse, Botswana
15:00 UTC+2	Tebogo Sembowa 76'	Report	Getaneh Kebede 34'; Saladin Said 45'	Stadium: Lobatse Stadium; Attendance: 5,000; Referee: Dennis Batte (Uganda)

15 June 2013 2014 FIFA WC qualification	Botswana	3–2	Central African Republic	Lobatse, Botswana
15:00 UTC+2	Jerome Ramatlhakwane 37' (pen.); Mogakolodi Ngele 74'; Ofentse Nato 86'	Report	Nicaise Zimbori-Auzingoni 29', 50'	Stadium: Lobatse Stadium; Attendance: 2,500; Referee: Juste Ephrem Zio (Burkina Faso)

7 July 2013 2013 COSAFA Cup	Swaziland	0–0	Botswana	Kitwe, Zambia
17:00		Report		Stadium: Arthur Davies Stadium; Referee: Bernard Camille (Seychelles)

9 July 2013 2013 COSAFA Cup	Lesotho	3–3	Botswana	Kitwe, Zambia
17:00	Ralekoti Mokhahlane 60' (pen.); Nkau Lerotholi 68'; Thapelo Tale 90+2'	Report	Jerome Ramatlhakwane 5', 50', 79'	Stadium: Arthur Davies Stadium; Referee: Dennis Nguluwe (Malawi)

11 July 2013 2013 COSAFA Cup	Kenya	1–2	Botswana	Kitwe, Zambia
15:00	Edwin Olerile 87' (o.g.)	Report	Lemponye Tshireletso 12'; Jerome Ramatlhakwane 90+4'	Stadium: Nkana Stadium; Referee: Bernard Camille (Seychelles)

27 July 2013 2014 CHAN qualification	Botswana	1–1	Zambia	Molepolole, Botswana
	Lemponye Tshireletso 82'	Report	Festus Mbewe 78'	Stadium: Molepolole Stadium; Referee: Shikongo (Namibia)

3 August 2013 2014 CHAN qualification	Zambia	2–0	Botswana	Ndola, Zambia
	Festus Mbewe 48'; Evans Kangwa 78'	Report		Stadium: Levy Mwanawasa Stadium; Referee: Nhleko (Swaziland)

31 August 2013 Friendly	Botswana	1–3	Uganda	Gaborone, Botswana
	Tebogo Sembowa 65'	Report	Emmanuel Okwi 17', 50'; Frank Kalanda 85'	Stadium: Botswana National Stadium

3 September 2013 Friendly	Botswana	1–0	Malawi	Gaborone, Botswana
	Jerome Ramatlhakwane 61'	Report		Stadium: Botswana National Stadium

7 September 2013 2014 FIFA WC qualification	South Africa	4–1	Botswana	Durban, South Africa
15:30 UTC+2	Kermit Erasmus 28'; Dean Furman 45'; Bernard Parker 84', 89' (pen.)	Report	Jerome Ramatlhakwane 73'	Stadium: Moses Mabhida Stadium; Attendance: 28,712; Referee: Badara Diatta (Senegal)

30 September 2013 Friendly	Botswana	1–0	Burkina Faso	Gaborone, Botswana
	Lemponye Tshireletso	Report		Stadium: Botswana National Stadium

=== 2014 ===
5 March 2014 Friendly	Botswana	3–0	South Sudan	Gaborone, Botswana
	Joel Mogorosi 35', 43'; Ofentse Nato 75'	Report		Stadium: Botswana National Stadium

11 May 2014 Friendly	Botswana	1–4	Swaziland	Gaborone, Botswana
	???	Report	???; ???; ???; ???	Stadium: Botswana National Stadium

18 May 2014 2015 AFCON qualification	Burundi	0–0	Botswana	Bujumbura, Burundi
15:30 UTC+2		Report		Stadium: Prince Louis Rwagasore Stadium; Referee: Mohamed Said Kordi (Tunisia)

1 June 2014 2015 AFCON qualification	Botswana	1–0	Burundi	Lobatse, Botswana
15:30 UTC+2	Joel Mogorosi 57'	Report		Stadium: Lobatse Stadium; Referee: Eric Otogo-Castane (Gabon)

1 July 2014 Friendly	Botswana	4–2	Tanzania	Gaborone, Botswana
	Jerome Ramatlhakwane 40'; Lemponye Tshireletso 48'; Bonolo Phuduhudu 68'; Karabo Phiri 75'	Report	Khamis Mcha Khamis 36'; John Bocco 85' (pen.)	Stadium: Botswana National Stadium

14 July 2014 Friendly	Botswana	2–0	Lesotho	Gaborone, Botswana
	Thato Ogopotse 66'; Onkabetse Makgantai 86'	Report		Stadium: Botswana National Stadium

19 July 2014 2015 AFCON qualification	Botswana	2–0	Guinea-Bissau	Gaborone, Botswana
15:00 UTC+2	Lemponye Tshireletso 29', 38'	Report		Stadium: Botswana National Stadium; Referee: Victor Gomes (South Africa)

2 August 2014 2015 AFCON qualification	Guinea-Bissau	1–1	Botswana	Bissau, Guinea Bissau
16:00 UTC±0	Ansumane Faty Seidi 17'	Report	Jerome Ramatlhakwane 80'	Stadium: Estádio 24 de Setembro; Referee: Kokou Fagla (Togo)

13 August 2014 Friendly	Angola	0–0	Botswana	Luanda, Angola
		Report		Stadium: Estádio 11 de Novembro

6 September 2014 2015 AFCON qualification	Tunisia	2–1	Botswana	Monastir, Tunisia
20:15 UTC+1	Wahbi Khazri 74'; Yassine Chikhaoui 89' (pen.)	Report	Joel Mogorosi 44'	Stadium: Stade Mustapha Ben Jannet; Referee: Mohamed Hamada (Mauritania)

10 September 2014 2015 AFCON qualification	Botswana	0–2	Senegal	Gaborone, Botswana
19:00 UTC+2		Report	Sadio Mané 32'; Dame N'Doye 83'	Stadium: Botswana National Stadium; Referee: Janny Sikazwe (Zambia)

30 September 2014 Friendly	Botswana	1–0	Zimbabwe	Gaborone, Botswana
	Galabgwe Moyana 74'	Report		Stadium: Botswana National Stadium

10 October 2014 2015 AFCON qualification	Botswana	0–2	Egypt	Gaborone, Botswana
18:30 UTC+2		Report	Mohamed Elneny 56'; Mohamed Salah 62'	Stadium: Botswana National Stadium; Referee: Tessema Bamlak (Ethiopia)

15 October 2014 2015 AFCON qualification	Egypt	2–0	Botswana	Cairo, Egypt
19:00 UTC+2	Amr Gamal 51'; Mohamed Salah 72'	Report		Stadium: Cairo International Stadium; Referee: Bienvenu Sinko (Ivory Coast)

14 November 2014 2015 AFCON qualification	Botswana	0–0	Tunisia	Gaborone, Botswana
18:30 UTC+2		Report		Stadium: Botswana National Stadium; Referee: Juste Ephrem Zio (Burkina Faso)

19 November 2014 2015 AFCON qualification	Senegal	3–0	Botswana	Dakar, Senegal
19:00 UTC±0	Kara Mbodj 21'; Papiss Cissé 26'; Moussa Sow 72'	Report		Stadium: Stade Léopold Sédar Senghor; Referee: Mehdi Abid Charef (Algeria)

=== 2015 ===
13 January 2015 Friendly	Burkina Faso	2–0	Botswana	Mbombela, South Africa
	Jonathan Zongo 27'; Aristide Bancé 30'	Report		Stadium: Mbombela Stadium

25 March 2015 Friendly	Botswana	2–0	Lesotho	Gaborone, Botswana
	Mpho Kgaswane 45'; Kabelo Seakanyeng 65'	Report		Stadium: Botswana National Stadium

29 March 2015 Friendly	Botswana	1–2	Mozambique	Lobatse, Botswana
	Ofentse Nato 10'; Kabelo Seakanyeng 65'	Report	Luís Miquissone 28'; Dominguês Pelembe 90+2'	Stadium: Lobatse Stadium

24 May 2015 2015 COSAFA Cup	South Africa	0–0 (6–7 p)	Botswana	Moruleng, South Africa
19:30		Report		Stadium: Moruleng Stadium; Referee: Wisdom Chewe (Zambia)
	Penalties
	Carl Lark (penalty missed); Clayton Daniels (penalty scored); Marc van Heerden (penalty scored); Gift Motupa (penalty scored); Thapelo Morena (penalty scored); Tlou Segolela (penalty scored); Mojeka Madisha (penalty scored); Kwanda Mngonyama (penalty missed)		(penalty scored) Ofentse Nato; (penalty scored) Mpho Kgaswane; (penalty scored) Joel Mogorosi; (penalty missed) Hendrick Moyo; (penalty scored) Kabelo Dambe; (penalty scored) Oteng Legwaila; (penalty scored) Katlego Koobake; (penalty scored) Mosha Gaolaolwe

28 May 2015 2015 COSAFA Cup	Mozambique	2–1	Botswana	Moruleng, South Africa
19:30	Isac Decarvalho 65'; Luis Parkim 88'	Report	Omaatla Kebatho 78'	Stadium: Moruleng Stadium; Referee: Duncan Lengani (Malawi)

30 May 2015 2015 COSAFA Cup	Madagascar	2–1	Botswana	Moruleng, South Africa
15:00	Sarivahy Vombola 16', 18'		Segolame Boy 84'	Stadium: Moruleng Stadium; Referee: Wisdom Chewe (Zambia)

13 June 2015 2017 AFCON qualification	Uganda	2–0	Botswana	Kampala, Uganda
16:00 UTC+3	Geofrey Massa 55'; Brian Umony 65'	Report		Stadium: Mandela National Stadium; Referee: Israel Mujuni (Tanzania)

21 June 2015 2016 CHAN qualification	Lesotho	0–0	Botswana	Maseru, Lesotho
14:50 UTC+2		Report		Stadium: Setsoto Stadium

4 July 2015 2016 CHAN qualification	Botswana	1–1	Lesotho	Gaborone, Botswana
15:00 UTC+2	Mpho Kgaswane 88'	Report	Thabiso Brown 81'	Stadium: Botswana National Stadium; Referee: Jackson Pavaza (Namibia)

5 September 2015 2017 AFCON qualification	Botswana	1–0	Burkina Faso	Francistown, Botswana
16:00 UTC+2	Joel Mogorosi 50'	Report		Stadium: Francistown Stadium; Referee: Parmendra Nunkoo (Mauritius)

30 September 2015 Friendly	Botswana	2–3	Ethiopia	Gaborone, Botswana
	Joel Mogorosi 40', 64'	Report	???; ???; ???	Stadium: Botswana National Stadium

10 October 2015 2018 FIFA WC qualification	Eritrea	0–2	Botswana	Asmara, Eritrea
16:00 UTC+3		Report	Galabgwe Moyana 22'; Joel Mogorosi 64'	Stadium: Cicero Stadium; Attendance: 9,950; Referee: Ibrahim Nour El Din (Egypt)

13 October 2015 2018 FIFA WC qualification	Botswana	3–1	Eritrea	Francistown, Botswana
20:00 UTC+2	Mogakolodi Ngele 15', 79'; Joel Mogorosi 21'	Report	Henok Goitom 9'	Stadium: Francistown Stadium; Attendance: 15,073; Referee: Nelson Fred (Seychelles)

14 November 2015 2018 FIFA WC qualification	Botswana	2–1	Mali	Francistown, Botswana
18:00 UTC+2	Tapiwa Gadibolae 14'; Joel Mogorosi 24'	Report	Samba Sow 56'	Stadium: Francistown Stadium; Attendance: 26,223; Referee: Ali Adelaïd (Comoros)

17 November 2015 2018 FIFA WC qualification	Mali	2–0	Botswana	Bamako, Mali
19:00 UTC±0	Cheick Diabaté 10' (pen.); Bakary Sako 30'	Report		Stadium: Stade du 26 Mars; Attendance: 15,000; Referee: Ali Lemghaifry (Mauritania)

=== 2016 ===
24 March 2016 2017 AFCON qualification	Comoros	1–0	Botswana	Mitsamiouli, Comoros
15:00 UTC+3	El Fardou Ben Nabouhane 59'	Report		Stadium: Stade Said Mohamed Cheikh; Referee: Duncan Lengani (Malawi)

27 March 2016 2017 AFCON qualification	Botswana	2–1	Comoros	Francistown, Botswana
16:00 UTC+2	Galabgwe Moyana 48'; Joel Mogorosi 87'	Report	Youssouf M'Changama 43'	Stadium: Francistown Stadium; Referee: Joaquin Esono (Equatorial Guinea)

21 May 2016 Friendly	Botswana	2–1	Lesotho	Serowe, Botswana
	Onkabetse Makgantai 68', 87'	Report	???	Stadium: Serowe Stadium

4 June 2016 2017 AFCON qualification	Botswana	1–2	Uganda	Francistown, Botswana
16:00 UTC+2	Onkabetse Makgantai 50'	Report	Luwagga Kizito 9'; Khalid Aucho 53'	Stadium: Francistown Stadium; Referee: Victor Gomes (South Africa)

18 June 2016 2016 COSAFA Cup	Namibia	1–1 (4–5 p)	Botswana	Windhoek, Namibia
17:30	Angula da Costa 50' (o.g.)	Report	Hendrik Somaeb 83' (pen.)	Stadium: Sam Nujoma Stadium; Referee: Janny Sikazwe (Zambia)
	Penalties
	(penalty scored) Boitumelo Mafoko; (penalty scored) Thabang Sesinyi; (penalty scored) Mosha Gaolaolwe; (penalty scored) Tebogo Sosome; (penalty scored) Joel Mogorosi		(penalty scored) Ronald Ketjijere; (penalty scored) Angula da Costa; (penalty scored) Hendrik Somaeb; (penalty scored) Itamunua Keimuine; (penalty missed) Deon Hotto

22 June 2016 2016 COSAFA Cup	Botswana	0–0 (5–4 p)	DR Congo	Windhoek, Namibia
19:30		Report		Stadium: Sam Nujoma Stadium; Referee: Helder de Carvalho (Angola)
	Penalties
	Boitumelo Mafoko (penalty scored); Mosha Gaolaolwe (penalty scored); Thato Kebue (penalty scored); Tebogo Sosome (penalty scored); Joel Mogorosi (penalty scored)		(penalty scored) Lema Mabidi; (penalty scored) Bompunga Botuli; (penalty missed) Guy Basisila; (penalty scored) Sedrick Ngulubi; (penalty scored) Junior Baometo

25 June 2016 2016 COSAFA Cup	South Africa	3–2	Botswana	Windhoek, Namibia
17:30	Gift Motupa 33' (pen.), 88' (pen.); Thabiso Kutumela 66'	COSAFA report	Onkabetse Makgantai 16'; Kabelo Seakanyeng 70'	Stadium: Sam Nujoma Stadium; Referee: Janny Sikazwe (Zambia)

4 September 2016 2017 AFCON qualification	Burkina Faso	2–1	Botswana	Ouagadougou, Burkina Faso
14:00 UTC±0	Préjuce Nakoulma 18'; Banou Diawara 90'	Report	Thabang Sesinyi 81' (pen.)	Stadium: Stade du 4 Août; Referee: Youssef Essrayri (Tunisia)

30 September 2016 Friendly	Botswana	1–1	Angola	Gaborone, Botswana
	Thabang Sesinyi 29'	Report	Paizinho 41'	Stadium: Botswana National Stadium

=== 2017 ===
25 March 2017 Friendly	Tanzania	2–0	Botswana	Dar es Salaam, Tanzania
	Mbwana Samatta 3', 88'	Report		Stadium: Benjamin Mkapa Stadium

10 June 2017 2019 AFCON qualification	Botswana	0–1	Mauritania	Francistown, Botswana
15:30 UTC+2		Report	Mohamed Soudani 77'	Stadium: Francistown Stadium; Referee: Davies Omweno (Kenya)

1 July 2017 2017 COSAFA Cup	Zambia	2–1	Botswana	Phokeng, South Africa
15:00	Brian Mwila 10'; Justin Shonga 70'	Report	Kabelo Seakanyeng 79'	Stadium: Royal Bafokeng Stadium; Referee: Ahmad Imtehaz Heeralall (Mauritius)

4 July 2017 2017 COSAFA Cup	South Africa	2–0	Botswana	Moruleng, South Africa
17:00	Riyaad Norodien 33'; Judas Moseamedi 90+3'	Report		Stadium: Moruleng Stadium; Referee: Andofetra Rakotojaona (Madagascar)

15 July 2017 2018 CHAN qualification	Botswana	0–2	South Africa	Francistown, Botswana
15:30 UTC+2		Report	Ryan Moon 31'; Gift Motupa 86'	Stadium: Francistown Stadium; Referee: Wellington Kaoma (Zambia)

22 July 2017 2018 CHAN qualification	South Africa	1–0	Botswana	Moruleng, South Africa
15:00 UTC+2	Ryan Moon 13'	Report		Stadium: Moruleng Stadium; Referee: Osiase Koto (Lesotho)

2 September 2017 Friendly	Tanzania	2–0	Botswana	Dar es Salaam, Tanzania
	Simon Msuva 6', 62'	Report		Stadium: Uhuru Stadium

30 September 2017 Friendly	Botswana	2–0	Ethiopia	Gaborone, Botswana
	Jerome Ramatlhakwane 2' (pen.), 61'	Report		Stadium: Botswana National Stadium

7 October 2017 Friendly	Namibia	3–1	Botswana	Windhoek, Namibia
	Peter Shalulile 33', 58'; Roger Katjiteo 90+2'	Report	Mpho Kgaswane 6'	Stadium: Sam Nujoma Stadium

14 November 2017 Friendly	Gabon	0–0	Botswana	Franceville, Gabon
		Report		Stadium: Stade de Franceville

=== 2018 ===
24 March 2018 Friendly	Botswana	1–0	Lesotho	Gaborone, Botswana
	Tebogo Sembowa 83'	Report		Stadium: Botswana National Stadium

18 April 2018 Friendly	Zimbabwe	0–1	Botswana	Harare, Zimbabwe
		Report	Kabelo Seakanyeng 21'	Stadium: National Sports Stadium

28 May 2018 2018 COSAFA Cup	Angola	1–2	Botswana	Polokwane, South Africa
17:00 (UTC+2)	Kaporal 58'	Report	Kabelo Seakanyeng 5' (pen.); Onkabetse Makgantai 45'	Stadium: Old Peter Mokaba Stadium; Referee: Hamada Nampiandraza (Madagascar)

30 May 2018 2018 COSAFA Cup	Malawi	1–1	Botswana	Polokwane, South Africa
19:30 (UTC+2)	Precious Sambani 7'	Report	Kabelo Seakanyeng 88'	Stadium: Old Peter Mokaba Stadium; Referee: Celso Alvação (Mozambique)

1 June 2018 2018 COSAFA Cup	Mauritius	0–6	Botswana	Polokwane, South Africa
17:30 (UTC+2)		Report	Onkabetse Makgantai 3', 70'; Karabo Phiri 16'; Thatayaone Kgamanyane 20'; Kabelo Seakanyeng 27'; Tshepo Maikano 55'	Stadium: Old Peter Mokaba Stadium; Referee: Jackson Pavaza (Namibia)

3 June 2018 2018 COSAFA Cup	Zimbabwe	1–1 (a.e.t.) (3–1 p)	Botswana	Polokwane, South Africa
17:30 (UTC+2)	Evans Rusike 39'	Report	Onkabetse Makgantai 60'	Stadium: Peter Mokaba Stadium; Referee: Hélder Martins De Carvalho (Angola)
	Penalties
	Abbas Amidu (penalty scored); Jameson Mukombwe (penalty scored); Khama Billiat (penalty scored)		(penalty scored) Kabelo Seakanyeng; (penalty missed) Tebogo Sosome; (penalty missed) Tumisang Orebonye; (penalty missed) Thatayaone Kgamanyane

5 June 2018 2018 COSAFA Cup	Swaziland	0–2	Botswana	Polokwane, South Africa
19:30 (UTC+2)		Report	Onkabetse Makgantai 9'; Gape Mohutsiwa 90+3'	Stadium: Old Peter Mokaba Stadium; Referee: Bernard Camille (Seychelles)

8 June 2018 2018 COSAFA Cup	South Africa	3–0	Botswana	Polokwane, South Africa
17:00 (UTC+2)	Motjeka Madisha 39'; Aubrey Modiba 78'; Lebohang Maboe 89'	Report		Stadium: Peter Mokaba Stadium; Referee: Hamada Nampiandraza (Madagascar)

9 September 2018 2019 AFCON qualification	Angola	1–0	Botswana	Luanda, Angola
16:00 UTC+1	Gelson 30'	Report		Stadium: Estádio 11 de Novembro; Referee: Bakary Gassama (Gambia)

30 September 2018 Friendly	Botswana	1–0	Namibia	Gaborone, Botswana
16:00 UTC+1	Tumisang Orebonye 4'	Report		Stadium: Botswana National Stadium

13 October 2018 2019 AFCON qualification	Burkina Faso	3–0	Botswana	Ouagadougou, Burkina Faso
18:00 UTC+0	Jonathan Pitroipa 4'; Banou Diawara 48'; Abdou Razack Traoré 61'	Report		Stadium: Stade du 4 Août; Referee: Bienvenu Sinko (Ivory Coast)

16 October 2018 2019 AFCON qualification	Botswana	0–0	Burkina Faso	Francistown, Botswana
19:00 UTC+2		Report		Stadium: Francistown Stadium; Referee: Peter Waweru (Kenya)

18 November 2018 2019 AFCON qualification	Mauritania	2–1	Botswana	Nouakchott, Mauritania
17:00 UTC+0	Ismaël Diakité 20', 84'	Report	Keeagile Kobe 4'	Stadium: Stade Cheikha Ould Boïdiya; Referee: Hassan Mohamed Hagi (Somalia)

=== 2019 ===
29 March 2019 2019 AFCON qualification	Botswana	0–1	Angola	Francistown, Botswana
19:00 UTC+2		Report	Wilson Eduardo 21'	Stadium: Francistown Stadium; Referee: Amin Mohamed Omar (Egypt)

20 April 2019 2020 CHAN qualification	Botswana	2–0	Seychelles	Lobatse, Botswana
16:00 UTC+2	Thatayaone Ditlhokwe 58'; Segolame Boy 62'	Report		Stadium: Lobatse Stadium; Referee: Ishmael Chizinga (Malawi)

11 May 2019 2020 CHAN qualification	Seychelles	1–3	Botswana	Victoria, Seychelles
16:30 UTC+4	Perry Monnaie 62'	Report	Thero Setsile 55', 87'; Joel Mogorosi 71'	Stadium: Stade Linité; Referee: Ganesh Chutooree (Mauritius)

2 June 2019 2019 COSAFA Cup	South Africa	2–2 (4–5 p)	Botswana	KwaMashu, South Africa
15:00 (UTC+2)	Luther Singh 19'; Grant Margeman 28'	Report	Lebogang Ditsele 61'; Thatayaone Ditlhokwe 90+3'	Stadium: Princess Magogo Stadium; Referee: Celso Alvação (Mozambique)
	Penalties
	Tercious Malepe (penalty scored); Sipho Mbule (penalty scored); Thendo Mukumela (penalty scored); Zakhele Lepasa (penalty scored); Teboho Mokoena (penalty missed)		(penalty scored) Moshe Gaolaolwe; (penalty scored) Thero Setsile; (penalty scored) Tumisang Orebonye; (penalty scored) Segolame Boy; (penalty scored) Mothusi Johnson

5 June 2019 2019 COSAFA Cup	Lesotho	1–2	Botswana	Durban, South Africa
17:00 (UTC+2)	Sera Motebang 79'	Report	Joel Mogorosi 7'; Segolame Boy 32'	Stadium: Moses Mabhida Stadium; Referee: Ganesh Chutooree (Mauritius)

8 June 2019 2019 COSAFA Cup	Zambia	1–0	Botswana	Durban, South Africa
15:00 (UTC+2)	Tapson Kaseba 78'	Report		Stadium: Moses Mabhida Stadium; Referee: Eugene Salas Mdluli (South Africa)

26 July 2019 2020 CHAN qualification	Botswana	0–0	Zambia	Francistown, Botswana
19:00 UTC+2		Report		Stadium: Francistown Stadium; Referee: Antonio Caluassi Dungula (Angola)

3 August 2019 2020 CHAN qualification	Zambia	3–2	Botswana	National Heroes Stadium, Lusaka
15:00 UTC+2	Emmanuel Chabula 13'; Kelvin Kampamba 45+2'; Bruce Musakanya 67'	Report	Omaatla Kebatho 10'; Segolame Boy 21'	Referee: Celso Alvacao (Mozambique)

7 September 2019 2022 WQ qualification	Botswana	0–0	Malawi	Francistown, Botswana
16:00 UTC+2		Report		Stadium: Francistown Stadium; Attendance: 14,000; Referee: Anthony Ogwayo (Kenya)

10 September 2019 2022 WQ qualification	Malawi	1–0	Botswana	Blantyre, Malawi
14:00 UTC+2	Gerald Phiri Jr. 81' (pen.)	Report		Stadium: Kamuzu Stadium; Attendance: 23,700; Referee: Souleiman Djama (Djibouti)

30 September 2019 Friendly	Botswana	0–0	Liberia	Gaborone, Botswana
		Report		Stadium: Botswana National Stadium

14 October 2019 Friendly	Egypt	1–0	Botswana	Amreya, Egypt
	Hamdy Fathy 74'	Report		Stadium: Borg El Arab Stadium

15 November 2019 2021 AFCON qualification	Zimbabwe	0–0	Botswana	Harare, Zimbabwe
18:00 UTC+2		Report		Stadium: National Sports Stadium; Referee: Thierry Nkurunziza (Burundi)

18 November 2019 2021 AFCON qualification	Botswana	0–1	Algeria	Gaborone, Botswana
21:00 UTC+2		Report	Youcef Belaïli 15'	Stadium: Botswana National Stadium; Referee: Ali Sabilla (Uganda)

== See also ==
- Botswana national football team results (1968–1999)
- Botswana national football team results (2020–present)
