= Botswana national football team results (1968–1999) =

The Botswana national football team represents Botswana in international football under the control of the Botswana Football Association. Following the independence of Botswana in 1966, the football federation was founded in 1970. It later joined the Confederation of African Football (CAF) in 1976 and FIFA in 1982.

The following list contains all results of Botswana's matches from 1968 to 1999.

== Key ==
The coloured backgrounds denote the result of the match:

– indicates Botswana won the match
– indicates Botswana's opposition won the match
– indicates the match ended in a draw

== Unofficial Results ==
=== 1968 ===
13 July 1968 Friendly	Malawi	8–1	Botswana	Malawi
		Report

13 July 1968 Friendly	Swaziland	3–1	Botswana	Swaziland
		Report	Seema

=== 1974 ===
30 October 1974 Friendly	Botswana	4–3	Swaziland
	Seema x2; Dennison; Tlape	Report	?

== Official Results ==
=== 1976 ===
13 September 1976 Friendly	Botswana	1–7	Malawi	Botswana
		Report

17 September 1976 Friendly	Botswana	0–3	Malawi	Botswana
		Report

30 September 1976 Friendly	Botswana	2–3	Zambia	Botswana
	Seema; Mofatt	Report

=== 1977 ===
27 July 1977 Friendly	Botswana	0–2	China	Botswana
		Report

30 September 1977 Friendly	Botswana	0–2	Malawi	Botswana
		Report

1 October 1977 Friendly	Botswana	1–5	Malawi	Botswana
		Report

=== 1978 ===
30 September 1978 Friendly	Botswana	1–4	Mozambique	Botswana
		Report

1 October 1978 Friendly	Botswana	0–2	Mozambique	Botswana
		Report

=== 1981 ===
18 April 1981 Friendly	Malawi	5–2	Botswana
		Report

30 September 1981 Friendly	Botswana	0–1	Zimbabwe	Botswana
		Report

=== 1982 ===
18 February 1982 Friendly	Zambia	2–0	Botswana	Lusaka, Zambia
		Report

=== 1986 ===
15 February 1986 Friendly	Zambia	6–0	Botswana	Ndola, Zambia
		Report

16 February 1986 Friendly	Zambia	3–0	Botswana	Lusaka, Zambia
		Report

26 February 1986 Friendly	Zambia	0–1	Botswana	Swaziland
		Report

30 September 1986 Friendly	Botswana	2–0	Malawi	Gaborone, Botswana
	Lastin Mzila; Rio Maswadi (pen.)	Report		Stadium: Botswana National Stadium

=== 1987 ===
28 March 1987 Friendly	Botswana	0–0	Mauritius	Gaborone, Botswana
		Report		Stadium: Botswana National Stadium

13 June 1987 1988 Summer Olympics qualification	Botswana	0–4	Zambia	Gaborone, Botswana
		Report	Fighton Simukonda; Golden Kazika; Lucky Msiska; Derby Makinka (pen.)	Stadium: Botswana National Stadium; Referee: Eganaden Cadressen (Mauritius)

21 June 1987 1988 Summer Olympics qualification	Zambia	3–0	Botswana	Lusaka, Zambia
	Ashols Melu, Stone Nyirenda	Report		Stadium: Independence Stadium; Referee: Kambaji Kabongo (Zaire)

30 September 1987 Friendly	Botswana	2–2	Tanzania	Gaborone, Botswana
	Boyo Radipotsane 8', 65' (pen.)	Report	Sanifu Lazaro 41'; Justin Mtekere 85'	Stadium: Botswana National Stadium

=== 1988 ===
10 August 1988 Friendly	Botswana	0–0	Zambia	Gaborone, Botswana
		Report		Stadium: Botswana National Stadium

=== 1989 ===
1 December 1989 Friendly	Botswana	2–1	Zambia	Botswana
	Jomo Mosweu; Patrick Zibochwa	Report

=== 1990 ===
20 January 1990 Friendly	Swaziland	3–1	Botswana	Lobamba, Eswatini
	Thulani Dlamini 46'; Ronnie Dube 81'; Brian Sibandze 89' (pen.)	Report	Patrick Zibochwa 88'	Stadium: Somhlolo National Stadium

21 January 1990 Friendly	Malawi	2–2	Botswana	Lobamba, Eswatini
	Daniel Dzinkambani 4'; Bob Mpinganjira	Report	Moshoeshoe Molelekwa 13' (pen.); Mothusi Koitsewe (pen.)	Stadium: Somhlolo National Stadium

23 January 1990 Friendly	Tanzania	0–0	Botswana	Lobamba, Eswatini
		Report		Stadium: Somhlolo National Stadium

24 June 1990 Friendly	Botswana	0–1	Mauritius	Gaborone, Botswana
		Report	Jean-Marc Ithier	Stadium: Botswana National Stadium

25 August 1990 Friendly	Botswana	1–3	Swaziland	Gaborone, Botswana
	Moshoeshoe Molelekwa 84' (pen.)	Report	Victor Gamedze 28'; Thulani Dlamini 109'; Turbie Terblanche 112'	Stadium: Botswana National Stadium

26 August 1990 Friendly	Botswana	0–7	Zimbabwe	Gaborone, Botswana
		Report	Agent Sawu, Peter Ndlovu; George Nechironga, Brenna Msiska (pen.); Albert Mabika	Stadium: Botswana National Stadium

30 September 1990 Friendly	Botswana	0–0	Cameroon	Gaborone, Botswana
		Report		Stadium: Botswana National Stadium

=== 1991 ===
20 June 1991 Friendly	Mozambique	2–0	Botswana	Mozambique
	Armandinho 35'; Nando 78' (pen.)	Report

25 June 1991 Friendly	Mozambique	1–1	Botswana	Mozambique
		Report

21 September 1991 Friendly	Botswana	2–1	Swaziland	Botswana
		Report

30 September 1991 Friendly	Botswana	0–0	Ghana	Botswana
		Report

=== 1992 ===
14 June 1992 1994 AFCON qualification	Lesotho	0–0	Botswana	Maseru, Lesotho
		Report		Stadium: Setsoto Stadium

28 June 1992 1994 AFCON qualification	Botswana	0–4	Lesotho	Gaborone, Botswana
		Report	Litsiso Khali 20'; Lefika Lekhotla 46'; Likhetho Mokhathi 60'; Thato Mohale 85'	Stadium: Botswana National Stadium

30 September 1992 Friendly	Botswana	1–3	Kenya	Gaborone, Botswana
		Report		Stadium: Botswana National Stadium

3 October 1992 Friendly	Botswana	0–1	Kenya	Gaborone, Botswana
		Report		Stadium: Botswana National Stadium

10 October 1992 1994 FIFA WC qualification	Ivory Coast	6–0	Botswana	Abidjan, Ivory Coast
	Abdoulaye Traoré 10', 17' (pen.), 86'; Oumar Ben Salah 14'; Joël Tiéhi 69'; Lucien Kassi-Kouadio 70'	Report		Stadium: Stade Félix Houphouët-Boigny; Attendance: 15,052; Referee: Titus Olabode Adegbehingbe (Nigeria)

20 December 1992 1994 FIFA WC qualification	Botswana	0–1	Niger	Gaborone, Botswana
		Report	Soumaila Yattaga 32'	Stadium: Botswana National Stadium; Referee: Wallace Ernest Mabuza (Swaziland)

=== 1993 ===
10 January 1993 Friendly	Botswana	0–2	South Africa	Gaborone, Botswana
		Report	Rudolph Seale 58'; John Moshoeu 86'	Stadium: Botswana National Stadium

17 January 1993 1994 FIFA WC qualification	Botswana	0–0	Ivory Coast	Gaborone, Botswana
		Report		Stadium: Botswana National Stadium; Referee: Alem Assefa (Ethiopia)

28 February 1993 1994 FIFA WC qualification	Niger	2–1	Botswana	Niamey, Niger
	Moussa Yahaya 23', 89'	Report	Itumeleng Duiker 37'	Stadium: Stade de 29 Juillet; Referee: Sidi Bekaye Magassa (Mali)

=== 1994 ===
1 July 1994 Friendly	Botswana	0–1	Namibia	Gaborone, Botswana
		Report		Stadium: Botswana National Stadium

23 August 1994 Friendly	Namibia	1–1	Botswana	Windhoek, Namibia
		Report		Stadium: Independence Stadium

25 August 1994 Friendly	Namibia	2–3	Botswana	Windhoek, Namibia
		Report		Stadium: Independence Stadium

4 September 1994 1996 AFCON qualification	Botswana	0–1	Guinea	Gaborone, Botswana
		Report	Titi Camara 89'	Stadium: National Stadium

16 October 1994 1996 AFCON qualification	Mozambique	3–1	Botswana	Maputo, Mozambique
	Arnaldo Ouana 34', 39', 73'	Report	Oliver Pikati 74'	Stadium: Estádio da Machava; Attendance: 9,000; Referee: Roger Milson Raharison (Madagascar)

13 November 1994 1996 AFCON qualification	Namibia	1–1	Botswana	Windhoek, Namibia
	Ruben van Wyk 89'	Report	Boikago Modise 25'	Stadium: Independence Stadium; Attendance: 5,000

=== 1995 ===
7 January 1995 1996 AFCON qualification	Botswana	1–3	Mali	Gaborone, Botswana
	Itumeleng Duiker 75'	Report	Bassala Touré 5'; Djibril Diawara 18', 26'	Stadium: National Stadium; Referee: Wallace Mabuza (Swaziland)

22 January 1995 1996 AFCON qualification	Botswana	1–2	Angola	Gaborone, Botswana
	Keitumetse Paul 44'	Report	Paulão 55', 63'	Stadium: National Stadium; Attendance: 10,000

9 April 1995 1996 AFCON qualification	Guinea	5–0	Botswana	Conakry, Guinea
	Fodé Camara 6', 10'; Mohamed Sylla 54'; Taifour Diané 60'; Abdoul Salam Sow 88'	Report		Stadium: Stade du 28 Septembre; Attendance: 50,000; Referee: Sackie Kennedy (Liberia)

16 April 1995 Friendly	Zambia	2–0	Botswana	Lusaka, Zambia
		Report		Stadium: Independence Stadium

23 April 1995 1996 AFCON qualification	Botswana	0–3	Mozambique	Gaborone, Botswana
		Report	Chiquinho Conde 15', 53'; Nuro Tualibudane Amino 69'	Stadium: National Stadium; Attendance: 15,000

30 April 1995 Friendly	Botswana	1–4	Zambia	Gaborone, Botswana
		Report		Stadium: Botswana National Stadium

4 June 1995 1996 AFCON qualification	Botswana	1–1	Namibia	Gaborone, Botswana
	Magomtosi Dintle 5'	Report	Frans Ananias 18'	Stadium: National Stadium; Attendance: 2,000

16 July 1995 1996 AFCON qualification	Mali	4–0	Botswana	Bamako, Mali
	Djibril Diawara 12', 50'; Seydou Lamine Traoré 46'; Oumar Bagayogo 85'	Report		Stadium: Stade Modibo Kéïta; Attendance: 20,000; Referee: Ahmed Jalloh (Sierra Leone)

30 July 1995 1996 AFCON qualification	Angola	4–0	Botswana	Luanda, Angola
	Joni 1', 9'; Rosário 43'; Paulo António Alves 50'	Report		Stadium: Estádio da Cidadela; Attendance: 25,000

=== 1996 ===
11 August 1996 1998 AFCON qualification	Botswana	0–0	Namibia	Gaborone, Botswana
		Report		Stadium: Botswana National Stadium; Attendance: 15,000; Referee: Felix Tangawarima (Zimbabwe)

25 August 1996 1998 AFCON qualification	Namibia	6–0	Botswana	Windhoek, Namibia
		Report	Ruben van Wyk, Johannes Hindjou, Silvanus Njambari; Gervatius Urikhob	Stadium: Independence Stadium; Attendance: 4,000

=== 1997 ===
21 February 1997 Friendly	Botswana	0–0	Swaziland	Gaborone, Botswana
		Report		Stadium: Botswana National Stadium

23 February 1997 Friendly	Botswana	1–4	Lesotho	Jwaneng, Botswana
		Report		Stadium: Galaxy Stadium

1 March 1997 1997 COSAFA Cup	Botswana	1–4	Malawi	Gaborone, Botswana
	Aaron Lesupi 3' (pen.)	Report	Felix Nyirongo 27'; John Maduka 51'; Jones Nkhwazi 73'; Meck Mwase 88'	Stadium: Botswana National Stadium; Attendance: 8,000

6 July 1997 Friendly	Malawi	0–0	Botswana	Lilongwe, Malawi
		Report		Stadium: Silver Stadium

=== 1998 ===
10 January 1998 Friendly	Swaziland	0–0	Botswana	Lobamba, Eswatini
		Report		Stadium: Somhlolo National Stadium

12 January 1998 Friendly	Lesotho	0–0	Botswana	Maseru, Lesotho
		Report		Stadium: Setsoto Stadium

21 January 1998 1998 COSAFA Cup	Botswana	1–2	Mozambique	Gaborone, Botswana
	Tshepiso Molwantwa 78'	Report	Tico-Tico 82'; Avelino Kepe 86'	Stadium: Botswana National Stadium

2 August 1998 2000 AFCON qualification	Botswana	0–0	Mozambique	Gaborone, Botswana
		Report		Stadium: Botswana National Stadium; Attendance: 6,000

15 August 1998 2000 AFCON qualification	Mozambique	2–1	Botswana	Maputo, Mozambique
	Dário Monteiro,	Report	Itumeleng Duiker	Stadium: Estádio da Machava; Attendance: 25,000

=== 1999 ===
20 February 1999 1999 COSAFA Cup	Botswana	1–2	South Africa	Gaborone, Botswana
	Dipsy Selolwane 13'	Report	Pollen Ndlanya 36'; Alfred Phiri 39'	Stadium: Botswana National Stadium

16 May 1999 Friendly	Swaziland	2–1	Botswana	Lobamba, Eswatini
	John Mdluli 25', 63'	Report	Dipsy Selolwane 65'	Stadium: Somhlolo National Stadium

28 May 1999 1999 COSAFA Cup	Botswana	0–2	Mozambique	Gaborone, Botswana
		Report	Dario 12'; Arnaldo Ouana 44'	Stadium: Botswana National Stadium

== See also ==
- Botswana national football team results (2000–2019)
- Botswana national football team results (2020–present)
