= 2003 COSAFA Cup =

Tournament details
- Teams: 12 (from 1 confederation)

Final positions
- Champions: Zimbabwe (2nd title)
- Runners-up: Malawi

Tournament statistics
- Matches played: 12
- Goals scored: 25 (2.08 per match)

This page provides summaries to the 2003 COSAFA Cup.

== First round ==
Winners of the first round advanced to the quarter-finals.

February 22, 2003

| Madagascar | 2–1 | Mauritius |
|---|---|---|
| Ruphin Menakely 16' (pen.); Jean-Jacques Radonamahafalison 33' | | Kersley Appou 50' |

Mahamasina Municipal Stadium, Antananarivo
March 15, 2003

| Namibia | 0–1 | Botswana |
|---|---|---|
| | | Tshepiso Molwantwa 4' |

Independence Stadium, Windhoek
March 22, 2003

| Mozambique | 0–0 (5–4 pen.) | Lesotho |

Estádio da Machava, Maputo
April 20, 2003

| Zimbabwe | 1–0 | Angola |
|---|---|---|
| Adam Ndlovu 20' |

National Stadium, Harare

== Quarter-finals ==
The four quarter-finalists of the 2002 edition South Africa, Malawi, Swaziland and Zambia received byes into quarter-finals.

May 25, 2003

| Botswana | 1–1 (1–4 pen.) | Malawi |
|---|---|---|
| Masego Ntshingane 21' | | Moses Chavula 87' |

Botswana National Stadium, Gaborone
July 13, 2003

| Swaziland | 2–0 | Madagascar |
|---|---|---|
| Siza Dlamini 30'; Mfanzile Dlamini 51' |

Somhlolo National Stadium, Lobamba
July 19, 2003

| South Africa | 0–1 | Zimbabwe |
|---|---|---|
| | | Lazarus Muhoni 15' |

East London, South Africa
July 27, 2003

| Zambia | 4–2 | Mozambique |
|---|---|---|
| Noel Mwandila 51', 80'; Harry Milanzi 84'; Collins Mbesuma 89' | | To 4'; Tico Tico 60' |

Independence Stadium, Lusaka

== Semi-finals ==
August 16, 2003

| Malawi | 1–1 (4–2 pen.) | Zambia |
|---|---|---|
| Russell Mwafulirwa 35' | | Sashi Chalwe 89' |

Chichiri Stadium, Blantyre
August 31, 2003

| Zimbabwe | 2–0 | Swaziland |
|---|---|---|
| Peter Ndlovu 8', 53' |

Barbourfields Stadium, Bulawayo

== Final ==
September 27, 2003

| Malawi | 1–2 | Zimbabwe |
|---|---|---|
| Russell Mwafulirwa 82' | | Albert Mbano 7'; Zvenyika Makonese 57' |

Chichiri Stadium, Blantyre
October 5, 2003

| Zimbabwe | 2–0 | Malawi |
|---|---|---|
| Charles Yohane 36'; Peter Ndlovu 66' |

National Stadium, Harare

2003 COSAFA Cup

Zimbabwe
Second title
