= 2007 COSAFA Cup =

Tournament details
- Teams: 13 (from 1 confederation)

Final positions
- Champions: South Africa (2nd title)
- Runners-up: Zambia

Tournament statistics
- Matches played: 15
- Goals scored: 23 (1.53 per match)

The 2007 COSAFA Cup was the 11th edition of the tournament. It was won by South Africa who beat Zambia 4–3 on penalties after a 0–0 draw after extra time.

== Format ==
In the first round, 12 teams were divided into 3 groups of 4 teams each. Each group played a knockout tournament. The winners of each group joined Zambia (holders) into the final round.

== First round ==
=== Group A ===
played in Estádio da Machava, Maputo, Mozambique

==== Semi-finals ====
Apr 28, 2007

Madagascar	0 – 1	Zimbabwe
		Kingston Nkhatha 8'

Apr 28, 2007

Mozambique	2 – 0	Seychelles
Bino 50' 77'

==== 3rd/4th Places ====
Apr 29, 2007

Madagascar	5 – 0	Seychelles
Paulin Voavy 11' 14' 69'; Claudio Ramiadamanana 61'; Faneva Ima Andriantsima 84'

==== Final ====
Apr 29, 2007

Mozambique	0 – 0 (5 – 4 pen.)	Zimbabwe

- Mozambique advance to the final round

=== Group B ===
played in Somhlolo National Stadium, Lobamba, Swaziland

==== Semi-finals ====
May 26, 2007

Malawi	0 – 0 (4 – 5 pen.)	South Africa

May 26, 2007

Swaziland	0 – 0 (5 – 6 pen.)	Mauritius

==== 3rd/4th Places ====
May 27, 2007

Swaziland	1 – 0	Malawi
Mphile Tsabedze 85'

==== Final ====
May 27, 2007

South Africa	2 – 0	Mauritius
Teko Modise 43' (pen.), 65'

- South Africa advance to the final round

=== Group C ===
played in Botswana National Stadium Gaborone, Botswana

==== Semi-finals ====
July 28, 2007

Angola	2 – 0	Lesotho
Manucho 39'; Santana 83'

July 28, 2007

Botswana	1 – 0	Namibia
Michael Mogaladi 19'

==== 3rd/4th Places ====
July 29, 2007

Lesotho	2 – 3	Namibia
Sello Muso 84' 87' (pen.)		Tara Katupose 53'; Brian Brendell 67' 77'

==== Final ====
July 29, 2007

Botswana	0 – 0 (3 – 1 pen.)	Angola

- Botswana advance to the final round

== Final round ==
- Zambia qualified as 2006 COSAFA Cup winner

=== Semi-finals ===
September 29, 2007

Zambia	3 – 0	Mozambique
Noah Chivuta 35'; Emmanuel Mayuka 69'; William Njovu 79'

Super Stadium, Atteridgeville, South Africa
September 29, 2007

South Africa	1 – 0	Botswana
Teko Modise 32'

Super Stadium, Atteridgeville, South Africa

=== Final ===
October 24, 2007

South Africa	0 – 0	Zambia
Penalties
Brett Evans (penalty missed); Thembinkosi Fanteni (penalty scored); Bevan Fransman (penalty scored); Siphiwe Tshabalala (penalty scored); Teko Modise (penalty scored)	4 - 3	(penalty missed) Rainford Kalaba; (penalty scored) Ian Bakala; (penalty scored) Kampamba Chintu; (penalty missed) James Chamanga; (penalty scored) Kennedy Mweene

Vodacom Park
Bloemfontein, South Africa
Referee: (Madagascar) Hubert Andriamiharisoa

2007 COSAFA Cup

South Africa
Second title

== Top scorers ==
3 goals

- (Madagascar) Paulin Voavy
- (South Africa) Teko Modise

2 goals

- (Mozambique) Bino
- (Namibia) Brian Brendell
- (Botswana) Sello Muso
