= Jerome Ramatlhakwane =

Motswana footballer (born 1985)

Personal information
- Full name: Jerome Ontiretse Otto Ramatlhakwane
- Date of birth: 29 May 1985 (age 41)
- Place of birth: Malolwane, Botswana
- Height: 1.72 m (5 ft 7 1/2 in)
- Position: Striker

Team information
- Current team: Township Rollers
- Number: 9

Senior career*
Years	Team	Apps	(Gls)
2005–2006	Mogoditshane Fighters		
2006–2008	Mochudi Centre Chiefs		
2008	APOP Kinyras Peyias		
2008–2011	Santos	15	(1)
2009–2010	→ Thanda Royal Zulu (loan)		
2011	Vasco da Gama	4	(2)
2013	Mochudi Centre Chiefs		
2013–2014	CS Don Bosco	0	(0)
2015–	Township Rollers	4	(4)

International career^{‡}
2006–2018	Botswana	61	(24)
- * Club domestic league appearances and goals as of 22 April 2011 ‡ National team caps and goals as of 18 April 2018

Jerome "Jay-Jay" Ramatlhakwane (born 29 May 1985) is a Motswana professional footballer who currently plays for Township Rollers as a striker.

== Club career ==
Born in Lobatse, Ramatlhakwane has played in Botswana for Mogoditshane Fighters and Mochudi Centre Chiefs, in Cyprus for APOP Kinyras Peyias, and in South Africa for Santos and Vasco da Gama. In January 2013 he signed for Mochudi Centre Chiefs.

Ramatlhakwane was meant to move from Santos to Vasco da Gama in the summer of 2010, but a transfer fee wasn't agreed until January 2011. After his work permit was initially denied, Ramatlhakwane didn't sign for Vasco da Gama until April 2011; he scored on his debut.

== International career ==
Ramatlhakwane scored on his senior debut for Botswana in a 1–0 win over Swaziland in November 2006, and has appeared in FIFA World Cup qualifying matches.

Ramatlhakwane led Botswana in scoring with five goals in qualifying for the 2012 African Cup of Nations. His fifth goal came on 26 March 2011 in N'Djamena, Chad as Botswana won 1-0 and became the first nation aside from the co-hosts to qualify for the 2012 African Cup of Nations, as Botswana would play in its first ever major tournament.

He scored four goals at the 2013 COSAFA Cup, including a hat-trick against Lesotho, which, however, was not enough for Botswana to move past the group stage. The goals earned him the tournament's golden boot award, and took his international tally to 17, surpassing the record of 16 goals held by Dipsy Selolwane.

=== International goals ===
Scores and results list Botswana's goal tally first.

No.	Date	Venue	Opponent	Score	Result	Competition
1.	15 November 2006	Botswana National Stadium, Gaborone	Eswatini	1–0	1–0	Friendly
2.	9 February 2008	Somhlolo National Stadium, Somhlolo	Eswatini	1–0	4–1	2008 Swaziland Four Nations Tournament
3.	9 February 2008	Somhlolo National Stadium, Somhlolo	Eswatini	2–0	4–1	2008 Swaziland Four Nations Tournament
4.	1 July 2010	Stade El Menzah, Tunis	Tunisia	1–0	1–0	2012 Africa Cup of Nations qualification
5.	4 August 2010	Selebi-Phikwe Stadium, Selebi-Phikwe	Zimbabwe	2–0	2–0	Friendly
6.	11 August 2010	Kamuzu Stadium, Blantyre	Malawi	1–0	1–1	2012 Africa Cup of Nations qualification
7.	4 September 2010	University of Botswana Stadium, Gaborone	Togo	2–1	2–1	2012 Africa Cup of Nations qualification
8.	17 November 2010	University of Botswana Stadium, Gaborone	Tunisia	1–0	1–0	2012 Africa Cup of Nations qualification
9.	26 March 2011	Stade Omnisports Idriss Mahamat Ouya, N'Djamena	Chad	1–0	1–0	2012 Africa Cup of Nations qualification
10.	21 December 2011	Royal Bafokeng Stadium, Rustenburg	Lesotho	1–0	3–0	Friendly
11.	21 December 2011	Royal Bafokeng Stadium, Rustenburg	Lesotho	2–0	3–0	Friendly
12.	23 May 2012	University of Botswana Stadium, Gaborone	Lesotho	3–0	3–0	Friendly
13.	4 June 2013	30 June Stadium, Cairo	Egypt	1–0	1–1	Friendly
14.	15 June 2013	Lobatse Stadium, Lobatse	Central African Republic	1–1	3–2	2014 FIFA World Cup qualification
15.	9 July 2013	Arthur Davies Stadium, Kitwe	Lesotho	1–0	3–3	2013 COSAFA Cup
16.	9 July 2013	Arthur Davies Stadium, Kitwe	Lesotho	2–0	3–3	2013 COSAFA Cup
17.	9 July 2013	Arthur Davies Stadium, Kitwe	Lesotho	3–2	3–3	2013 COSAFA Cup
18.	11 July 2013	Nkana Stadium, Kitwe	Kenya	2–1	2–1	2013 COSAFA Cup
19.	3 September 2013	Botswana National Stadium, Gaborone	Malawi	1–0	1–0	Friendly
20.	7 September 2013	Moses Mabhida Stadium, Durban	South Africa	1–2	1–4	2014 FIFA World Cup qualification
21.	1 July 2014	Botswana National Stadium, Gaborone	Tanzania	1–1	4–2	Friendly
22.	2 August 2014	Estádio 24 de Setembro, Bissau	Guinea-Bissau	1–1	1–1	2015 Africa Cup of Nations qualification
23.	21 December 2017	Botswana National Stadium, Gaborone	Ethiopia	1–0	2–0	Friendly
24.	21 December 2017	Botswana National Stadium, Gaborone	Ethiopia	2–0	2–0	Friendly

== Honours ==
National team

- Winners: 2008 Swaziland Four Nations Tournament
