= Moemedi Moatlhaping =

Motswana footballer

Personal information
- Full name: Moemedi Jomo Moatlhaping
- Date of birth: 14 July 1985 (age 41)
- Place of birth: Moshupa, Botswana
- Height: 1.78 m (5 ft 10 in)
- Position: Midfielder

Team information
- Current team: Gaborone United

Senior career*
Years	Team	Apps	(Gls)
2004–2006	Township Rollers		
2006–2007	Platinum Stars	18	(0)
2007–2008	Township Rollers		
2008–2011	Centre Chiefs		
2011–2012	Bay United		
2012–	Gaborone United		

International career
2004–2013	Botswana	51	(9)
- * Club domestic league appearances and goals

Moemedi "Jomo" Moatlhaping (born 14 July 1985) is a Motswana former footballer who played as a midfielder. He represented the Botswana national team.

== Career statistics ==
=== International ===
Appearances and goals by national team and year
National team	Year	Apps	Goals
Botswana	2004	4	0
Botswana	2005	10	2
Botswana	2006	6	2
Botswana	2007	1	0
Botswana	2008	3	2
Botswana	2009	7	0
Botswana	2010	3	0
Botswana	2011	6	3
Botswana	2012	4	0
Botswana	2013	7	0
Total		51	9

Scores and results list Botswana's goal tally first, score column indicates score after each Moatlhaping goal.

List of international goals scored by Moemedi Moatlhaping
No.	Date	Venue	Opponent	Score	Result	Competition	Ref.
1	16 March 2005	Rufaro Stadium, Harare, Zimbabwe	Zimbabwe	1–1	1–1	Friendly	
2	16 April 2005	Independence Stadium, Windhoek, Namibia	Namibia	1–1	1–1	2005 COSAFA Cup	
3	20 May 2006	Botswana National Stadium, Gaborone, Botswana	Madagascar	1–0	2–0	2006 COSAFA Cup	
4	3 October 2006	Botswana National Stadium, Gaborone, Botswana	Lesotho	1–0	1–0	Friendly	
5	16 January 2008	King Zwelithini Stadium, Umlazi, South Africa	South Africa	1–1	1–2	Friendly	
6	9 February 2008	Somhlolo National Stadium, Lobamba, Eswatini	Swaziland	3–0	4–1	Friendly	
7	9 February 2011	Estádio da Machava, Maputo, Mozambique	Mozambique	1–0	1–1	Friendly	
8	20 March 2011	Stade de Marrakech, Marrakesh, Morocco	Morocco	1–1	1–1	Friendly	
9	10 August 2011	University of Botswana Stadium, Gaborone, Botswana	Kenya	1–0	1–0	Friendly	
