= List of stadiums in Botswana =

This is a list of sports stadiums in Botswana, ranked in descending order of capacity. Stadiums in Botswana with a capacity of 10,000 or more are included, even though the list is incomplete.

== Current stadiums ==
Image	Stadium	Location	Capacity	Sport	Occupant
	Botswana National Stadium	Gaborone	25,000	Football	National football team
	New Lobatse Stadium	New Lobatse	15,000	Football	National football team
	Francis-town Stadium	Francis-town	15,000	Football	National football team
	Molepolole Stadium	Molepolole	20,000	National football team	Used for club football cup and play-off finals.
	Maun Stadium		10,000	National football team	Used for club football cup and play-off finals.
	Phikwe Stadium	Phikwe	10,000	Cricket, Rugby league & Speedway, Football	National football team
	University of Botswana Stadium	Phikwe	8,500	Cricket, Rugby league & Speedway, Football	National football team

== See also ==
- Lists of stadiums
