= Michael Mogaladi =

Motswana footballer

Personal information
- Full name: Michael Mogaladi
- Date of birth: 7 July 1982 (age 44)
- Place of birth: Botswana
- Height: 1.82 m (5 ft 11 1/2 in)
- Position: Attacking midfielder

Team information
- Current team: Centre Chiefs

Senior career*
Years	Team	Apps	(Gls)
2006–2007	Maritzburg United F.C.	20	(2)
2007–	Centre Chiefs		

International career
2002–2012	Botswana	54	(4)
- * Club domestic league appearances and goals as of 29 August 2009

Michael Mogaladi (born 7 July 1982) is a Motswana footballer.

== Career statistics ==
=== International ===
Appearances and goals by national team and year
National team	Year	Apps	Goals
Ecuador	2002	1	0
Ecuador	2003	10	1
Ecuador	2004	6	0
Ecuador	2005	9	0
Ecuador	2006	6	0
Ecuador	2007	7	1
Ecuador	2008	6	0
Ecuador	2009	5	0
Ecuador	2010	1	1
Ecuador	2011	–	
Ecuador	2012	3	1
Total		54	4

Scores and results list Botswana's goal tally first, score column indicates score after each Mogaladi goal.

List of international goals scored by Michael Mogaladi
No.	Date	Venue	Opponent	Score	Result	Competition
1	22 June 2003	Somhlolo National Stadium, Lobamba, Swaziland	Swaziland	1–3	2–3	2004 Africa Cup of Nations qualification
2	28 July 2007	Botswana National Stadium, Gaborone, Botswana	Namibia	1–0	1–0	2007 COSAFA Cup
3	3 March 2010	Estádio da Machava, Matola, Mozambique	Mozambique	1–0	1–0	Friendly
4	15 August 2012	Molepolole Stadium, Molepolole, Botswana	Tanzania	3–2	3–3	Friendly
