= Botswana national football team results =

Botswana national football team results may refer to:

- Botswana national football team results (1968 to 1999)
- Botswana national football team results (2000 to 2019)
- Botswana national football team results (2020 to present)
