= 2010 COSAFA U-20 Cup =

Tournament details
- Host country: Botswana
- Dates: 3–12 December 2010
- Teams: 13 (from 1 confederation)
- Venues: 2 (in 2 host cities)

Tournament statistics
- Matches played: 19

The 2010 COSAFA U-20 Cup was the 19th edition of the football tournament that involves the youth teams from Southern Africa. Botswana hosted the competition.

== Participants ==
Group A

- Botswana
- Swaziland
- Zimbabwe
- Malawi (Note: Withdrew for second consecutive year)

Group B

- South Africa
- Lesotho
- Namibia

Group C

- Zambia
- Mauritius
- Angola

Group D

- Comoros (Note: Withdrew)
- Madagascar
- Mozambique
- Seychelles

== Group stage ==
=== Group A ===
3 December 2010
16:00 UTC+2

| Botswana | 0 - 3 | Zimbabwe |

UB Stadium, Gaborone

5 December 2010
15:00 UTC+2

| Botswana | 2 - 0 | Swaziland |
|---|---|---|
| Tafa 12' |

Molepolole Stadium, Molepolole

7 December 2010
17:00 UTC+2

| Swaziland | v | Zimbabwe |

Molepolole Stadium, Molepolole

=== Group B ===
4 December 2010
15:00 UTC+2

| Lesotho | 2 - 2 | Namibia |

UB Stadium, Gaborone

7 December 2010
15:00 UTC+2

| South Africa | 1 - 2 | Lesotho |

Molepolole Stadium, Molepolole

8 December 2010
15:00 UTC+2

| South Africa | v | Namibia |

UB Stadium, Gaborone

=== Group C ===
4 December 2010
17:00 UTC+2

| Zambia | 2-2 | Angola |
|---|---|---|
| Lungu 15'; Phiri 66' | (Report) | 13' Vunge; (red card) 28' Baiao; 44' Sequeira |

Lobatse Stadium, Lobatse
Referee: (Botswana) Kutlwano Leso

5 December 2010
15:00 UTC+2

| Mauritius | 1 - 2 | Angola |

UB Stadium, Gaborone

8 December 2010
15:00 UTC+2

| Zambia | v | Mauritius |

UB Stadium, Gaborone

=== Group D ===
4 December 2010
15:00 UTC+2

| Madagascar | 5 - 0 | Seychelles |
|---|---|---|
| Rakotondramantra |

Molepolole Stadium, Molepolole

5 December 2010
17:00 UTC+2

| Seychelles | 0 - 2 | Mozambique |

UB Stadium, Gaborone

8 December 2010
15:00 UTC+2

| Mozambique | 0 - 2 | Madagascar |
|---|---|---|
| | report |

Molepolole Stadium, Molepolole

== Knockout stage ==
Semi-finals
Zambia
Zimbabwe
Namibia
Madagascar

Final
Zambia | 4
Namibia | 1
Third place
Zimbabwe | 3
Madagascar | 1

=== Semi finals ===
10 December 2010
15:00 UTC+2

| Zimbabwe | v | Zambia |

Molepolole Stadium, Molepolole
10 December 2010
17:00 UTC+2

| Namibia | v | Madagascar |

Molepolole Stadium, Molepolole

=== Third Place Playoff ===
12 December 2010
11:00 UTC+2

| Zimbabwe | 3 - 1 | Madagascar |

UB Stadium, Gaborone

=== Final ===
12 December 2010
15:00 UTC+2

| Zambia | 4 - 1 | Namibia |

UB Stadium, Gaborone
