= 2008 Swaziland Four Nations Tournament =

Tournament details
- Host country: Swaziland
- Dates: 9 February – 10 February
- Venue: 1 (in 1 host city)

Final positions
- Champions: Botswana

Tournament statistics
- Matches played: 4
- Goals scored: 11 (2.75 per match)
- Top scorer(s): (Botswana) Jerome Ramatlhakwane (Botswana) Moemedi Moatlhaping (2 goals)
- All statistics correct as of February 10.

The Swaziland Four Nations Tournament 2008 soccer finals were held from February 9 to February 10, 2008, at the Somhlolo National Stadium in Lobamba, Swaziland. Swaziland, Botswana, Lesotho and Mozambique XI were the teams who played in this tournament. Malawi were originally due to take part, but withdrew at the last moment and Mozambique took their place. Mozambique played with an Invitational XI not their A team, therefore all their matches are unofficial.

== Matches ==
=== Semi-finals ===
February 9, 2008

Swaziland	1 – 4	Botswana
Tsabedze 77'		Ramatlhakwane 21', 45'; Moatlhaping 54'; Moloi 73'

Somhlolo National Stadium, Lobamba

February 9, 2008

Mozambique	1 – 0	Lesotho
Nhamache 21'

Somhlolo National Stadium, Lobamba

=== Third Place ===
February 10, 2008

Swaziland	2 – 2*	Lesotho
Steenkamp 48'; Kunene 58'		Moletsane 33'; Motsweli 87'

Somhlolo National Stadium, Lobamba

* (1–4 after penalty kicks).

=== Final ===
February 10, 2008

Botswana	1 – 0	Mozambique
Moatlhaping 57'

Somhlolo National Stadium, Lobamba

== Winner ==
Swaziland Four Nations Tournament 2008 champion

Botswana

== Scorers ==
2 goals:

- (Botswana) Jerome Ramatlhakwane
- (Botswana) Moemedi Moatlhaping

1 goal:

- (Botswana) Pontsho Moloi
- (Mozambique) Mauricio F. Nhamache
- (Lesotho) Bushy Moletsane
- (Lesotho) Thabo Motsweli
- (Eswatini) Baiano Kunene
- (Eswatini) Barry Steenkamp
- (Eswatini) Tony Tsabedze
