= Football at the 2003 Afro-Asian Games =

2003 Afro-Asian Games Football Tournament

Tournament details
- Host country: India
- City: Hyderabad
- Dates: 22–31 October 2003
- Teams: 7 (from 2 confederations)
- Venue(s): Lal Bahadur Shastri Stadium; GMC Balayogi Athletic Stadium

Final positions
- Champions: Uzbekistan U-21
- Runners-up: India
- Third place: Zimbabwe
- Fourth place: Rwanda

Tournament statistics
- Top scorer(s): (Zimbabwe) Albert Mbano (India) I. M. Vijayan (4 goals each)

Football at the 2003 Afro-Asian Games was held in Hyderabad, India from 22 to 31 October 2003. The football preliminaries commenced two days before the Opening Ceremony of the Games.

The football tournament was a men's-only event. Eight teams were set to participate, but only seven played. The Uzbekistan U-21 youth team were the gold medalists beating the host country India in the final. The host country took silver, while Zimbabwe won bronze.

== Original setting and withdrawals ==
Initially, eight teams were set to participate in the football events - Burkina Faso, Cameroon, India, Rwanda, Zimbabwe, the U-21 youth teams of Uzbekistan and Malaysia, and the U-23 youth team of Malavan F.C. which is an Iranian football club that represented their country.

Cameroon withdrew, and Ghana was chosen as the replacement. However, just before the preliminaries, Ghana pulled out of the event, leaving only seven teams participating.

== Venues ==
The football events were held in two stadiums - the GMC Balayogi Athletic Stadium, which was the main stadium of the Games; and the Lal Bahadur Shastri Stadium. The football finals were held in the latter stadium.

== Group A ==
Team	Pld	W	D	L	GF	GA	GD	Pts
India	2	2	0	0	5	2	3	6
Rwanda	2	1	0	1	3	4	1	3
Malaysia U-21	2	0	0	2	1	4	−3	0
Ghana	Withdrew							

=== Matches ===
22 October

India	3–1	Rwanda
Vijayan 13'; M. Suresh 54'; Ashim 79'	Report	Aziz Balinda 61'

24 October

India	2–0	Malaysia U-21
Jatin 50'; Vijayan 64'	Report

26 October

Rwanda	2–1	Malaysia U-21
Jimmy Iraguha 81', 87'	Report	Yahyah 28'

== Group B ==
Iran were represented by U-23 club side Malavan Bandar Anzali Football Club.

Team	Pld	W	D	L	GF	GA	GD	Pts
Uzbekistan U-21	3	2	1	0	3	1	2	7
Zimbabwe	3	1	2	0	6	3	3	5
Burkina Faso	3	1	0	2	3	6	−3	3
(Iran) Malavan U-23	3	0	1	2	2	4	−2	1

=== Matches ===
23 October

Zimbabwe	4–1	Burkina Faso
Prince Vusumuzi Nyoni 3', 74'; Albert Mbano 26', 82'	Report	Barro Samba Seydou 16'

23 October

Malavan U-23 (Iran)	0–1	Uzbekistan U-21
	Report	Marat Bikmoev 48'

25 October

Zimbabwe	1–1	(Iran) Malavan U-23
Brian Badza 3'	Report	Seyed Jalal Hosseini-Khoshkbijari 59' (pen.)

25 October

Burkina Faso	0–1	Uzbekistan U-21
	Report	Yaroslav Krushilnitskiy 66'

27 October

Uzbekistan U-21	1–1	Zimbabwe
Ilkom Suyunov 50'	Report	Leonard Tsipa 17'

27 October

Burkina Faso	2–1	(Iran) Malavan U-23
Abdul Moctar Diallo; Germain Bationo	Report	Germain Bationo (o.g.)

== Knockout stage ==
=== Bracket ===
Semi-finals
India	5
Zimbabwe	3
Uzbekistan U-21	2
Rwanda	1

Final
India	0
Uzbekistan U-21	1

=== Semi-finals ===
29 October 2003

Uzbekistan U-21	2–1	Rwanda
Mansur Saidov 63'; Konstantin Boev 102'	Report	Mulisa 73'

29 October 2003

India	5–3	Zimbabwe
Vijayan 25', 33'; Bhutia 41', 83' (pen.); R.Singh 58'	Report	Mbano 5'; Edmore Mashiri 81' (pen.); Simon Chipunza 87'

=== Third place match ===
31 October 2003

Zimbabwe	2–2 (a.e.t.)	Rwanda
Prince Vusumuzi Nyoni 65'; Mbano 90'	Report	Hassan Milly 37'; Jimmy Iraguha 75'
Penalties
	5–3

=== Final ===
31 October 2003

India	0–1	Uzbekistan
	Report	Islom Inomov 90'

Lal Bahadur Shastri Stadium, Hyderabad
Referee: Lu Chun (China)

== Overall ranking ==
Results	Teams							
Results	Uzbekistan	India	Zimbabwe	Rwanda	Iran	Burkina Faso	Malaysia	Ghana
Quarter-finals								Withdrew
Victories	1	2	1	1	1	1	0	Withdrew
Losses	1	0	0	1	1	2	2	Withdrew
Draws	1	0	2	0	1	0	0	Withdrew
Points	7	6	5	3	3	3	0	Withdrew
Semi-finals								Withdrew
Semifinalists					–	—N/a	—N/a	Withdrew
Points	3	3	0	0	—N/a	—N/a	—N/a	Withdrew
Final								Withdrew
Finalists			—N/a	—N/a	—N/a	—N/a	—N/a	Withdrew
Final Statistics								Withdrew
Ranking	1	2	3	4	5	6	7	Withdrew
Medal	Gold	Silver	Bronze	—N/a	—N/a	—N/a	—N/a	Withdrew
Total points	13	9	5	3	3	3	0	Withdrew

Preceded by -	Afro-Asian Games; Host City; I Afro-Asian Games (2003)	Succeeded by Algiers
