= Siza Dlamini =

Swazi footballer

Personal information
- Full name: Siza Selby Dlamini
- Date of birth: 2 April 1976 (age 50)
- Position: Forward

Senior career*
| Years | Team | Apps | (Gls) |
| 1994–1999 | Mbabane Swallows | 77 | (15) |
| 1999–2001 | Bush Bucks | 22 | (6) |
| 2001–2004 | Lamontville Golden Arrows | 55 | (13) |
| 2004–2006 | Durban Stars | 42 | (13) |
| 2006–2007 | FC AK | 21 | (6) |
| 2007–2011 | Jomo Cosmos | 28 | (5) |
| Total | | 245 | (58) |

International career
| 1997–2010 | Swaziland MNT | 40 | (9) |
- * Club domestic league appearances and goals

Siza Selby Dlamini (born 2 April 1976) is a Liswati retired footballer who played as a striker. He has been capped for Eswatini. He was also named a top 10 COSAFA Cup Legend.

He served as an assistant coach for Jomo Cosmos after his retirement.

== Clubs ==
- 1994–1999 : (Eswatini) Mbabane Swallows
- 1999–2001 : (South Africa) Bush Bucks
- 2001–2004 : (South Africa) Lamontville Golden Arrows
- 2004–2006 : (South Africa) Durban Stars
- 2006–2007 : (South Africa) FC AK
- 2007–2011 : (South Africa) Jomo Cosmos

== International ==
Scores and results list Swaziland's goal tally first, score column indicates score after each Dlamini goal.

List of international goals scored by Siza Dlamini
| No. | Date | Venue | Opponent | Score | Result | Competition | Ref. |
|---|---|---|---|---|---|---|---|
| 1 | 23 August 1998 | Mahamasina Municipal Stadium, Antananarivo, Madagascar | Madagascar | 1-1 | 1-1 | 2000 African Cup of Nations qualification | |
| 2 | 23 April 2000 | Estádio da Cidadela, Luanda, Angola | Angola | 1-5 | 1-7 | 2002 FIFA World Cup qualification | |
| 3 | 5 May 2002 | National Sports Stadium | Zimbabwe | 1-0 | 2-0 | 2002 COSAFA Cup | |
| 4 | 22 June 2003 | Somhlolo National Stadium, Lobamba, Eswatini | Botswana | 1-0 | 3-2 | 2004 African Cup of Nations qualification | |
| 5 | 22 June 2003 | Somhlolo National Stadium, Lobamba, Eswatini | Botswana | 3-0 | 3-2 | 2004 African Cup of Nations qualification | |
| 6 | 13 July 2003 | Somhlolo National Stadium, Lobamba, Eswatini | Madagascar | 1-0 | 2-0 | 2003 COSAFA Cup | |
| 7 | 12 October 2003 | Somhlolo National Stadium, Lobamba, Eswatini | Cape Verde | 1-1 | 1-1 | 2006 FIFA World Cup qualification | |
| 8 | 8 June 2008 | Somhlolo National Stadium, Lobamba, Eswatini | Togo | 1-0 | 2-1 | 2010 FIFA World Cup qualification | |
| 9 | 11 August 2010 | Estádio da Machava, Maputo, Mozambique | Mozambique | 1-1 | 1-2 | Friendly | |
