= Refiloe Potse =

Mosotho footballer (born 1978)

Personal information
- Full name: Refiloe Potse
- Date of birth: 11 September 1978 (age 48)
- Place of birth: Maseru, Lesotho
- Position: Striker

Team information
- Current team: Lesotho Prison Service
- Number: 9

Senior career*
Years	Team	Apps	(Gls)
2000–2004	Defence Force	99	(43)
2004–2010	Correctional Services	169	(102)
2010–2011	Linare Leribe	16	(6)

International career^{‡}
2000–2009	Lesotho	21	(9)
- * Club domestic league appearances and goals ‡ National team caps and goals as of 10:49, 22 December 2009 (UTC)

Refiloe Potse (born 11 September 1978) is a former Mosotho footballer who last played as a striker for Linare Leribe. Since 2000, he has won 21 caps and scored nine goals for the Lesotho national football team.

Scores and results list Lesotho's goal tally first, score column indicates score after each Potse goal.

List of international goals scored by Refiloe Potse
No.	Date	Venue	Opponent	Score	Result	Competition	Ref.
1	25 May 2003	Setsoto Stadium, Maseru, Lesotho	Swaziland	1-1	2-1	Friendly	
2	25 May 2003	Setsoto Stadium, Maseru, Lesotho	Swaziland	2-1	2-1	Friendly	
3	19 March 2005	Setsoto Stadium, Maseru, Lesotho	Namibia	1-0	1-2	Friendly	
4	1 June 2005	Setsoto Stadium, Maseru, Lesotho	Swaziland	2-1	3-4	Friendly	
5	11 June 2005	Independence Stadium, Lusaka, Zambia	Malawi	1-0	1-2	2005 COSAFA Cup	
6	18 March 2007	Somhlolo National Stadium, Lobamba, Eswatini	Swaziland	1-0	1-0	Friendly	
7	25 March 2007	Setsoto Stadium, Maseru, Lesotho	Niger	1-0	3-1	2008 Africa Cup of Nations qualification	
8	25 March 2007	Setsoto Stadium, Maseru, Lesotho	Niger	2-1	3-1	2008 Africa Cup of Nations qualification	
9	22 August 2007	Petaling Jaya Stadium, Petaling Jaya, Malaysia	Laos	1-0	3-1	Friendly	
