= Njobvu =

Family name

Njobvu is a surname of Zambian origin. Notable people with the surname include:

- Rhoda Njobvu (born 1994), Zambian sprinter
- William Njobvu (born 1987), Zambian football midfielder
