= Tebogo Sembowa =

Motswana footballer

Personal information
- Date of birth: 7 February 1988 (age 38)
- Place of birth: Francistown, Botswana
- Height: 1.73 m (5 ft 8 in)
- Position: Forward

Team information
- Current team: Jwaneng Galaxy

Senior career*
Years	Team	Apps	(Gls)
2010–2011	Notwane		
2012	Township Rollers		
2012–2015	Gaborone United		
2015–	Jwaneng Galaxy		

International career^{‡}
2012–2018	Botswana	16	(4)
- * Club domestic league appearances and goals as of 3 October 2021 ‡ National team caps and goals as of 3 October 2021

Tebogo Sembowa (born 7 February 1988) is a Motswana footballer who plays for Jwaneng Galaxy and has been capped for the Botswana national team.

== International career ==
=== International goals ===
Scores and results list Botswana's goal tally first.

No	Date	Venue	Opponent	Score	Result	Competition
1.	12 July 2012	Nyayo National Stadium, Nairobi, Kenya	Kenya	1–0	1–3	Friendly
2.	16 July 2012	Molepolole Stadium, Molepolole, Botswana	Zimbabwe	1–0	1–0	Friendly
3.	31 August 2013	Botswana National Stadium, Gaborone, Botswana	Uganda	1–2	1–3	Friendly
4.	24 March 2018	Botswana National Stadium, Gaborone, Botswana	Lesotho	1–0	1–0	Friendly
