= 2006 COSAFA Cup =

Tournament details
- Teams: 13 (from 1 confederation)

Final positions
- Champions: Zambia (3rd title)
- Runners-up: Angola

Tournament statistics
- Matches played: 15
- Goals scored: 34 (2.27 per match)

This page provides summaries to the 2006 COSAFA Cup.

== Format ==
In the first round, 12 teams were divided into 3 groups of 4 teams each. Each group played a knockout tournament. The winners of each group joined Zimbabwe (holders) into the final round.

== First round ==
=== Group A ===
Played in Maseru, Lesotho

==== Semi-finals ====
April 29, 2006

Angola	5 - 1	Mauritius
Akwá 3', 28', 55', 59'; Love 89'		Jerry Louis 2'

April 29, 2006

Lesotho	0 - 0 (5–4 pen.)	Mozambique

==== 3rd/4th Places ====
April 30, 2006

Mauritius	0 - 0 (4–5 pen.)	Mozambique

==== Final ====
April 30, 2006

Angola	3 - 1	Lesotho
Mateus 47'; Zé Kalanga 50', 61'		Bushi Moletsane 89'

- Angola advance to final round

=== Group B ===
Played in Gaborone, Botswana

==== Semi-finals ====
May 20, 2006

South Africa	1 - 0	Swaziland
Benson Mhlongo 12'

May 20, 2006

Botswana	2 - 0	Madagascar
Moemedi Moatlhaping 66'; Khumo Motlhabane 68'

==== 3rd/4th Places ====
May 21, 2006

Swaziland	2 - 0	Madagascar
Zweli Msibi 56'; Mzwandile Mamba 82'

==== Final ====
May 21, 2006

Botswana	0 - 0 (6–5 pen.)	South Africa

- Botswana advance to final round

=== Group C ===
Played in Windhoek, Namibia

==== Semi-finals ====
July 22, 2006

Zambia	3 - 1	Malawi
Dube Phiri 84'; Rainford Kalaba 85'; Christopher Katongo 88'		Noel Mkandawire 16'

July 22, 2006

Namibia	1 - 1 (2–4 pen.)	Seychelles
Costa Khaiseb 18'		Wilnes Brutus 11'

==== 3rd/4th Places ====
July 23, 2006

Namibia	3 - 2	Malawi
Heinrich Isaacks 45'; Rudolf Bester 46'; Henrico Botes (pen)		Moses Chavula 19'; James Chilapondwa 85'

==== Final ====
July 23, 2006

Zambia	2 - 0	Seychelles
James Chamanga 33'; Ignatius Lwipa 44'

- Zambia advance to final round

== Final round ==
- Zimbabwe qualified as 2005 COSAFA Cup winner

=== Semi-finals ===
August 19, 2006

Zambia	1 - 0	Botswana
Given Singuluma 52'

Lusaka, Zambia
September 17, 2006

Zimbabwe	1 - 2	Angola
Francis Chandida 64'		Gazeta 45'; Love 73'

Harare, Zimbabwe

=== Final ===
October 21, 2006

Zambia	2 - 0	Angola
Dube Phiri 76'; Chaswe Nsofwa 89'

Lusaka, Zambia

2006 COSAFA Cup

Zambia
Third title

== Top scorers ==
4 goals

- (Angola) Akwá

2 goals

- (Angola) Mateus
- (Angola) Zé Kalanga
- (Angola) Love
- (Zambia) Dube Phiri
