= Pontsho Moloi =

Motswana retired footballer (born 1981)

Personal information
- Full name: Pontsho Moloi
- Date of birth: 28 November 1981 (age 44)
- Place of birth: Gaborone, Botswana
- Height: 1.68 m (5 ft 6 in)
- Position: Forward

Senior career*
| Years | Team | Apps | (Gls) |
| 2004–2007 | Notwane | 45 | (13) |
| 2007– | Mochudi Centre Chiefs | 88 | (31) |
| 2009–2010 | → Bay United (loan) | ? | (?) |

International career^{‡}
| 2004–2012 | Botswana | 50 | (7) |
- * Club domestic league appearances and goals ‡ National team caps and goals as of 24 May 2017

Pontsho "Piro" Moloi (born 28 November 1981) is a Motswana former footballer who played as a forward for Mochudi Centre Chiefs. He won 50 caps representing the [[Botswana national football team|Botswana national team. He currently manages Mochudi Centre Chiefs SC and he is the assistant manager of the [Botswana national football team]].

== Career ==
Moloi has played club football for local sides Notwane F.C. and Mochudi Centre Chiefs. In 2009, he went on a one-season loan to Bay United F.C. of South Africa's National First Division.

=== International goals ===
Scores and results list Botswana's goal tally first.

| No | Date | Venue | Opponent | Score | Result | Competition |
|---|---|---|---|---|---|---|
| 1. | 6 July 2006 | Civo Stadium, Lilongwe, Malawi | Malawi | 1–0 | 2–1 | Friendly |
| 2. | 7 February 2007 | Botswana National Stadium, Gaborone, Botswana | Namibia | 1–0 | 1–0 | Friendly |
| 3. | 9 February 2008 | Somhlolo National Stadium, Lobamba, Swaziland | Swaziland | 4–0 | 4–1 | Friendly |
| 4. | 22 October 2009 | Barbourfields Stadium, Bulawayo, Zimbabwe | Seychelles | 1–0 | 2–0 | 2009 COSAFA Cup |
| 5. | 27 October 2010 | University of Botswana Stadium, Gaborone, Botswana | Swaziland | ?–0 | 2–0 | Friendly |
| 6. | 21 December 2011 | Royal Bafokeng Stadium, Phokeng, South Africa | Lesotho | ?–0 | 3–0 | Friendly |
| 7. | 23 May 2012 | University of Botswana Stadium, Gaborone, Botswana | Lesotho | ?–0 | 3–0 | Friendly |
