= 2005 COSAFA Cup =

Tournament details
- Teams: 13 (from 1 confederation)

Final positions
- Champions: Zimbabwe (3rd title)
- Runners-up: Zambia

Tournament statistics
- Matches played: 12
- Goals scored: 30 (2.5 per match)

This page provides summaries to the 2005 COSAFA Cup.

== Format ==
In the first round, twelve teams were divided into three groups of four teams each. Each group played a knockout tournament. The winners of each group joined Angola (holders) into the final round.

== First round ==
=== Group A ===
Played in Stade George V, Curepipe, Mauritius.

==== Semi-finals ====
February 26, 2005

Seychelles	0–3	South Africa
		Katlego Mphela 12', 16'; Lerato Chabangu 44'

February 26, 2005

Mauritius	2–0	Madagascar
Kersley Appou 44'; Jerry Louis 48'

==== Final ====
February 27, 2005

Mauritius	0–1	South Africa
		Katlego Mphela 36'

=== Group B ===
Played in Independence Stadium, Windhoek, Namibia

==== Semi-finals ====
April 16, 2005

Mozambique	0–3	Zimbabwe
		Cephas Chimedza 66' (pen.), 78'; Sageby Sandaka 82'

April 16, 2005

Namibia	1–1 (1–2 pen.)	Botswana
Henrico Botes 35' (o.g.)		Moemedi Moatlhaping 90'

==== Final ====
April 17, 2005

Zimbabwe	2–0	Botswana
Brian Badza 21'; Sageby Sandaka 82'

=== Group C ===
Played in Independence Stadium, Lusaka, Zambia

==== Semi-finals ====
June 11, 2005

Lesotho	1–2	Malawi
Refiloe Potse 46' (pen.)		Daniel Chitsulo 53'; Jimmy Zakazaka 73'

June 11, 2005

Zambia	3–0	Swaziland
Collins Mbesuma 44', 47'; Rainford Kalaba 53'

==== Final ====
June 12, 2005

Zambia	2–1	Malawi
Collins Mbesuma 83', 88'		John Maduka 56'

== Final round ==
- Played in Mmabatho Stadium, Mafikeng, South Africa
- Angola (holders) received a bye to the semi-finals.

=== Semi-finals ===
August 13, 2005

Angola	1–2	Zimbabwe
Love 51'		Francis Chandida 57'; Sageby Sandaka 87'

August 13, 2005

South Africa	2–2 (8–9 pen.)	Zambia
Lungisani Ndlela 63'; Abram Raselemane 68'		James Chamanga 18'; Christopher Katongo 24'

=== Final ===
August 14, 2005

Zimbabwe	1–0	Zambia
Francis Chandida 84'

2005 COSAFA Cup

Zimbabwe
Third title

== Top scorers ==
4 goals

- (Zambia) Collins Mbesuma

3 goals

- (South Africa) Katlego Mphela
- (Zimbabwe) Sageby Sandaka

2 goals

- (Zimbabwe) Cephas Chimedza
- (Zimbabwe) Francis Chandida
