= Morwalela Seema =

Motswana footballer

Personal information
- Full name: Morwalela Seema
- Date of birth: 21 May 1949 (age 77)
- Place of birth: Mahalapye, Botswana
- Position: Centre-forward

Youth career
- 1966–1968: Queens Park Rangers B

Senior career*
Years	Team	Apps	(Gls)
1968–1970	Queens Park Rangers		
1970–1984	Township Rollers		
- Gaborone Club (Sunday league)

International career
1968–1976	Botswana XI (Non-CAF)		(3+)
1976–1984	Botswana	10	(1)
- * Club domestic league appearances and goals

Morwalela Seema (born 21 May 1949) is a Motswana former footballer who played as a striker for Mahalapye-based club Queens Park Rangers, Township Rollers and the Botswana national football team. He retired from professional football in 1984 as one of the best Batswana to ever grace the game.

== Club career ==
Seema started to play football in primary school and joined the Queens Park Rangers development team in 1966. Two years later he was promoted to the first team.

In 1970 he left Rangers for Township Rollers, where he became part of the Township Rollers Golden Generation which won four successive league titles under Chibaso Kande. In 1984 he left Township Rollers to play Sunday football for Gaborone Club before eventually leaving football altogether.

== International career ==
He earned his first call-up to the Botswana national team, then known as Botswana XI, in 1968 and although his travel was rushed, due to having been called later than the other players, and he had no proper football boots, he greatly impressed.

He scored on his debut for Botswana XI during the 3–1 loss against Swaziland on 30 September 1968 (which was Botswana's second ever match), and he scored twice during the 4–3 victory against Swaziland on 30 September 1974. Seema would go on to become a regular member of the Botswana XI squad, hailed by some as the best incarnation of the Botswana national team.

Botswana's first match as a CAF member — and its first official international match — was the 3–2 loss against Zambia on 30 August 1976 in which Seema scored one of Botswana's two goals.

== Career statistics ==
=== International ===
Only includes known statistics from 1976 onwards. Matches played prior to August 1976 are recorded as appearances for Botswana XI, as they took place before Botswana became a CAF member.

Appearances and goals by national team and year
National team	Year	Apps	Goals
Botswana XI (pre-CAF)	1968	1+	1+
Botswana XI (pre-CAF)	1974	1+	2+
Botswana XI (pre-CAF)	1976	2	0
Botswana	1976	1	1
Botswana	1977	3	0
Botswana	1978	2	0
Botswana	1979	—	
Botswana	1980	—	
Botswana	1981	2	0
Botswana	1982	1	0
Botswana	1983	—	
Botswana	1984	1	0
Total		14+	3+

Scores and results list Botswana's goal tally first, score column indicates score after each Seema goal.

List of international goals scored by Morwalela Seema
No.	Date	Venue	Cap	Opponent	Score	Result	Competition	Ref.
1.	30 August 1976	Unknown	3	Zambia	?	2–3	Friendly	

== Honours ==
=== Club ===
Township Rollers

- Botswana Premier League: 1979, 1980, 1982, 1983, 1984
- Botswana FA Cup: 1979
