= Phineas Maimela =

Motswana footballer

Personal information
- Full name: Phineas Maimela
- Date of birth: 19 September 1978 (age 48)
- Place of birth: Botswana
- Position: Midfielder

Senior career*
| Years | Team | Apps | (Gls) |
| 1996–2007 | Extension Gunners | | |

International career
| 1997–2002 | Botswana | | |
- * Club domestic league appearances and goals

Phineas Maimela (born 19 September 1978) is a Motswana former footballer who played as a midfielder. He played for the Botswana national football team between 1997 and 2000.
