= Itumeleng Duiker =

Motswana footballer (born 1972)

Personal information
- Full name: Itumeleng Duiker
- Date of birth: 16 January 1972 (age 54)
- Place of birth: Botswana
- Position: Midfielder

Senior career*
Years	Team	Apps	(Gls)
1991–1994	Extension Gunners		
1998–1999	Dynamos		
2000–2001	Extension Gunners		

International career
1992–2000	Botswana		
- * Club domestic league appearances and goals

Itumeleng Duiker (born 16 January 1972) is a Motswana former footballer who played as a midfielder. He played for the Botswana national football team between 1992 and 2000 and currently is the head coach of Extension Gunners in the Botswana Premier League.

== Playing career ==
Duiker scored Botswana's lone goal in a 2-1 loss against Nigeria during the qualification for the 1994 FIFA World Cup. He also played a part in Extension Gunners three consecutive Botswana Premier League wins between 1992 and 1994.

== Coaching career ==
As of 2018, Duiker is the head coach of Extension Gunners. He took over in 2017 as a caretaker manager but achieved good results and was given the full-time position.

Duiker also has managed the Botswana under-17s national team.
