= Charles Yohane =

Zimbabwean footballer (1973–2022)

Personal information
- Date of birth: 26 August 1973
- Place of birth: Mbare, Rhodesia
- Date of death: 12 February 2022 (aged 48)
- Place of death: Soweto, South Africa
- Position: Midfielder

Senior career*
Years	Team	Apps	(Gls)
1992–1993	Fire Batteries	51	(16)
1994	African Wanderers	13	(2)
1995	Fire Batteries	22	(8)
1996	AmaZulu	28	(3)
1997–2006	Bidvest Wits	268	(44)
2006–2008	FC AK		

International career
1996–2007	Zimbabwe	23	(1)
- * Club domestic league appearances and goals

Charles Yohane (26 August 1973 – 12 February 2022) was a Zimbabwean footballer who played as a midfielder.

== Club career ==
Born in a Salisbury suburb as the fourth of seven kids, Yohane came through the Dynamos football academy before joining Fire Batteries. In January 1995, he moved to South Africa joining the Gordon Igesund-managed African Wanderers then returned home to Zimbabwe. He then went back to South Africa to join AmaZulu before a lengthy spell at Bidvest Wits.

== International career ==
Yohane was a member of the Zimbabwe national team at the 2004 African Nations Cup, which finished bottom of its group in the first round of competition, thus failing to secure qualification for the quarter-finals. He also participated at the 2006 African Nations Cup, with the same outcome.

== Managerial career ==
Yohane was a coach at the Wits University development team until its collapse in 2020 and was later coaching Leruma United FC in the ABC Motsepe League.

== Death ==
Yohane was carjacked and shot dead, suffering a gunshot in February 2022 while in South Africa working as a delivery driver. His body was found in Mzimhlophe, Soweto, on 14 February 2022. He was 48.
