= Russell Mwafulirwa =

Malawian footballer

Personal information
- Full name: Russell Mwafulirwa
- Date of birth: 24 February 1983 (age 43)
- Place of birth: Zomba, Malawi
- Height: 1.86 m (6 ft 1 in)
- Position: Striker

Senior career*
Years	Team	Apps	(Gls)
–2000	Silver Strikers	0	(0)
2000–2002	Big Bullets FC	36	(17)
2002–2006	Jomo Cosmos	49	(9)
2006–2008	Ajax Cape Town	50	(10)
2008–2011	IFK Norrköping	57	(18)
2012–2015	IK Sleipner	2	(1)
2016	Mzuzu United	0	(0)

International career^{‡}
2002–2013	Malawi	42	(9)
- * Club domestic league appearances and goals as of 25 February 2021 ‡ National team caps and goals as of 25 February 2021

Russell Mwafulirwa (born 24 February 1983, in Zomba) is a Malawian former football player who played for Ajax Cape Town and IFK Norrköping. In 2020 went to Sweden for coaching courses.

== Career ==
Mwafulirwa began his career with Silver Strikers in Malawi. In 2002, he signed for South African Premier Soccer League club Jomo Cosmos. After almost four years with Jomo Cosmos, he joined Ajax Cape Town in January 2006. In June 2008, he transferred to Swedish team IFK Norrköping.

== International career ==
He was part of the Malawi national football team at the 2010 Africa Cup of Nations scoring two goals in the group stage against Algeria and Mali.

Scores and results list Malawi's goal tally first, score column indicates score after each Mwafulirwa goal.

List of international goals scored by Russell Mwafulirwa
No.	Date	Venue	Opponent	Score	Result	Competition	Ref.
1	12 October 2002	Civo Stadium, Lilongwe, Malawi	Angola	1–0	1–0	2004 Africa Cup of Nations qualification	
2	16 August 2003	Kamuzu Stadium, Blantyre, Malawi	Zambia	1–0	1–1	2003 COSAFA Cup	
3	27 September 2003	Kamuzu Stadium, Blantyre, Malawi	Zimbabwe	1–2	1–2	2003 COSAFA Cup	
4	9 October 2004	Kamuzu Stadium, Blantyre, Malawi	Tunisia	1–0	2–2	2006 FIFA World Cup qualification	
5	18 June 2005	Kamuzu Stadium, Blantyre, Malawi	Botswana	1–2	1–3	2006 FIFA World Cup qualification	
6	10 June 2007	Kamuzu Stadium, Blantyre, Malawi	Senegal	1–3	2–3	Friendly	
7	18 November 2007	Mavuso Sports Centre, Manzini, Swaziland	Swaziland	1–0	3–0	Friendly	
8	11 January 2010	Estádio 11 de Novembro, Talatona, Angola	Algeria	1–0	3–0	2010 Africa Cup of Nations	
9	18 January 2010	Estádio Nacional do Chiazi, Cabinda, Angola	Mali	1–2	1–3	2010 Africa cup of Nations	
