= Rudolph Seale =

South African soccer player

Personal information
- Full name: Rudolph Gardner Seale
- Date of birth: 29 October 1966 (age 60)
- Place of birth: Soweto, South Africa
- Position: Defender

Youth career
- 1979–1984: Kaizer Chiefs

Senior career*
Years	Team	Apps	(Gls)
1985–1986	Giant Blackpool (loan)		
1989–1995	Kaizer Chiefs	216	(22)
1996–2003	Supersport United	234	(12)
2003	HP Silver Stars	4	(1)
Total		454	(35)

International career
1993–1994	South Africa	9	(1)

Managerial career
- 2003: HP Silver Stars (assistant)
- * Club domestic league appearances and goals

Rudolph Seale (born 29 November 1966) is a South African former soccer player who played at both professional and international levels as a defender. Seale last played club football for HP Silver Stars as a player-assistant coach; he also earned nine caps and one goal for the South African national side between 1993 and 1994.

== Youth career ==
He played for Chiefs juniors U12, U14 and U18 where he was snapped up by Giant Blackpool's former Chiefs coach Eddie Lewis.

== Giant Blackpool ==
His six-month spell at Blackpool was successful where he helped them win the OK League.

== Kaizer Chiefs ==
Chiefs signed back their own product in 1986.

He retired in 2003 at the age of 37.

== Personal life ==
"Mgababa" has a son, Tenasch (born 1994).

== International career ==
Seale scored his one and only international goal on debut in the 58th minute in a 2-0 win over Botswana on 10 January 1993. He played his last international on 12 June 1994 in a 1-0 loss to Australia.

== After retirement ==
He sends PSL stats to PA Sport in the UK on match days.

=== International goals ===
#	Date	Venue	Opponent	Score	Result	Competition
1	10 January 1993	Gaborone, Botswana	Botswana	1-0	2-0	International friendly
