= Sello Muso =

Mosotho footballer (born 1986)

Personal information
- Full name: Sello Muso
- Date of birth: 3 March 1986 (age 40)
- Place of birth: Lesotho
- Position: Right winger

Team information
- Current team: Lioli Teyateyaneng

Senior career*
| Years | Team | Apps | (Gls) |
| 2005–2007 | Likhopo Maseru | | |
| 2007–2008 | Free State Stars | | |
| 2008–2012 | Lioli Teyateyaneng | | |
| 2012– | Likhopo Maseru | | |

International career^{‡}
| 2006– | Lesotho | 22 | (4) |
- * Club domestic league appearances and goals ‡ National team caps and goals as of 08:44, 22 December 2009 (UTC)

Sello Muso (born 3 March 1986) is a Mosotho footballer who currently plays as a midfielder for Likhopo Maseru. Since 2006, he has won 22 caps and scored four goals for the Lesotho national football team.
