= Mphile Tsabedze =

Swaziland footballer

Personal information
- Full name: Mphile Tsabedze
- Date of birth: 4 April 1985 (age 41)
- Place of birth: Swaziland
- Position: Midfielder

Senior career*
Years	Team	Apps	(Gls)
2004–2006	Mhlambanyatsi Rovers		
2006–2008	Mbabane Highlanders		
2008–	Young Buffaloes		

International career
2007–	Swaziland	7	(1)
- * Club domestic league appearances and goals

Mphile Tsabedze (born 4 April 1985) is a Swaziland international footballer who plays as a midfielder. As of February 2010, he plays for Young Buffaloes in the Swazi Premier League and has won seven caps and scored one goal for his country.
