= George Nechironga =

Zimbabwean association footballer

Personal information
- Date of birth: 7 June 1969 (age 57)
- Place of birth: Zimbabwe
- Height: 1.60 m (5 ft 3 in)
- Position: Striker

Senior career*
Years	Team	Apps	(Gls)
–1991	CAPS United		
1993–1994	Darryn T		
1995–1996	Sokół Pniewy	13	(1)
1996–1999	Bloemfontein Celtic		
1999–2000	Free State Stars		
2000–2001	African Wanderers		

International career
1989–1995	Zimbabwe	3	(1)
- * Club domestic league appearances and goals

George Nechironga (born 7 June 1967) is a Zimbabwean former professional footballer who played as a striker.

== Early life ==
Nechironga was nicknamed "Tyson".

== Club career ==
At the age of sixteen, Nechironga signed for Zimbabwean side CAPS United. He was joint-voted the Zimbabwe 1990 Soccer Star of the Year with Zimbabwe international Peter Ndlovu.

== International career ==
Nechironga represented Zimbabwe internationally at youth level and at senior level.

== Style of play ==
Nechironga mainly operated as a striker and was known for his speed.

== Post-playing career ==
After retiring from professional football, Nechironga worked as a manager.

== Personal life ==
Nechironga is the brother of Zimbabwean footballer Francis Nechironga and is the son of Zimbabwean footballer Jawett Nechironga.
