= Mokgathi Mokgathi =

Motswana footballer

Personal information
- Full name: Mokgathi Mokgathi
- Place of birth: Botswana
- Position: Striker

Team information
- Current team: Botswana Defence Force XI

Senior career*
Years	Team	Apps	(Gls)
1995–1997	Township Rollers		
2006–2007	TASC FC		
2007–	Botswana Defence Force XI		

International career^{‡}
2004–	Botswana	4	(0)
- * Club domestic league appearances and goals ‡ National team caps and goals as of 11:44, 21 December 2009 (UTC)

Mokgathi Mokgathi is a Motswana professional footballer who plays as a striker. He has won four caps for the Botswana national team.
