= Tshepiso Molwantwa =

Motswana footballer

Personal information
- Date of birth: October 17, 1978 (age 48)
- Place of birth: Botswana
- Position: Striker

Team information
- Current team: Notwane FC
- Number: 12

Senior career*
Years	Team	Apps	(Gls)
2001–02	Township Rollers FC	?	(?)
2002–03	Dangerous Aces FC		
2003–06	Township Rollers FC		
2006–present	Notwane FC		

International career^{‡}
1998–2006	Botswana	44	(8)
- * Club domestic league appearances and goals as of January 27, 2007 ‡ National team caps and goals as of January 27, 2007

Tshepiso "Sox" Molwantwa (born October 17, 1978) is a Motswana former footballer who played as a striker. He was a member of the Botswana national football team.

Molwanta was part of the Botswana side at the 1995 African U-17 Championship in Mali. He along with his teammates were promoted to Botswana's under-23 national team and then the senior national team.

Scores and results list Botswana's goal tally first, score column indicates score after each Molwantwa goal.

List of international goals scored by Tshepiso Molwantwa
No.	Date	Venue	Opponent	Score	Result	Competition	Ref.
1	25 January 1998	Botswana National Stadium, Gaborone, Botswana	Mozambique	1-0	1-2	1998 COSAFA Cup qualification	
2	2 March 2002	Somhlolo National Stadium, Lobamba, Eswatini	Swaziland	—	6-2	Friendly	
3	16 March 2003	Independence Stadium, Windhoek, Namibia	Namibia	1-0	1-0	2003 COSAFA Cup	
4	6 September 2003	Somhlolo National Stadium, Lombamba, Eswatini	Swaziland	—	3-0	Friendly	
5	11 October 2003	Botswana National Stadium, Gaborone, Botswana	Lesotho	1-0	4-1	2006 FIFA World Cup qualification	
6	9 October 2004	Botswana National Stadium, Gaborone, Botswana	Kenya	1-1	2-1	2006 FIFA World Cup qualification	
7	18 June 2005	Kamuzu Stadium, Blantyre, Malawi	Malawi	1-0	3-1	2006 FIFA World Cup qualification	
8	8 October 2005	Botswana National Stadium, Gaborone, Botswana	Guinea	1-0	1-2	2006 FIFA World Cup qualification	
