= Malolwane =

Village in Kgatleng District, Botswana

Coordinates: 24°32′53″S 26°28′22″E

Location of Malolwane

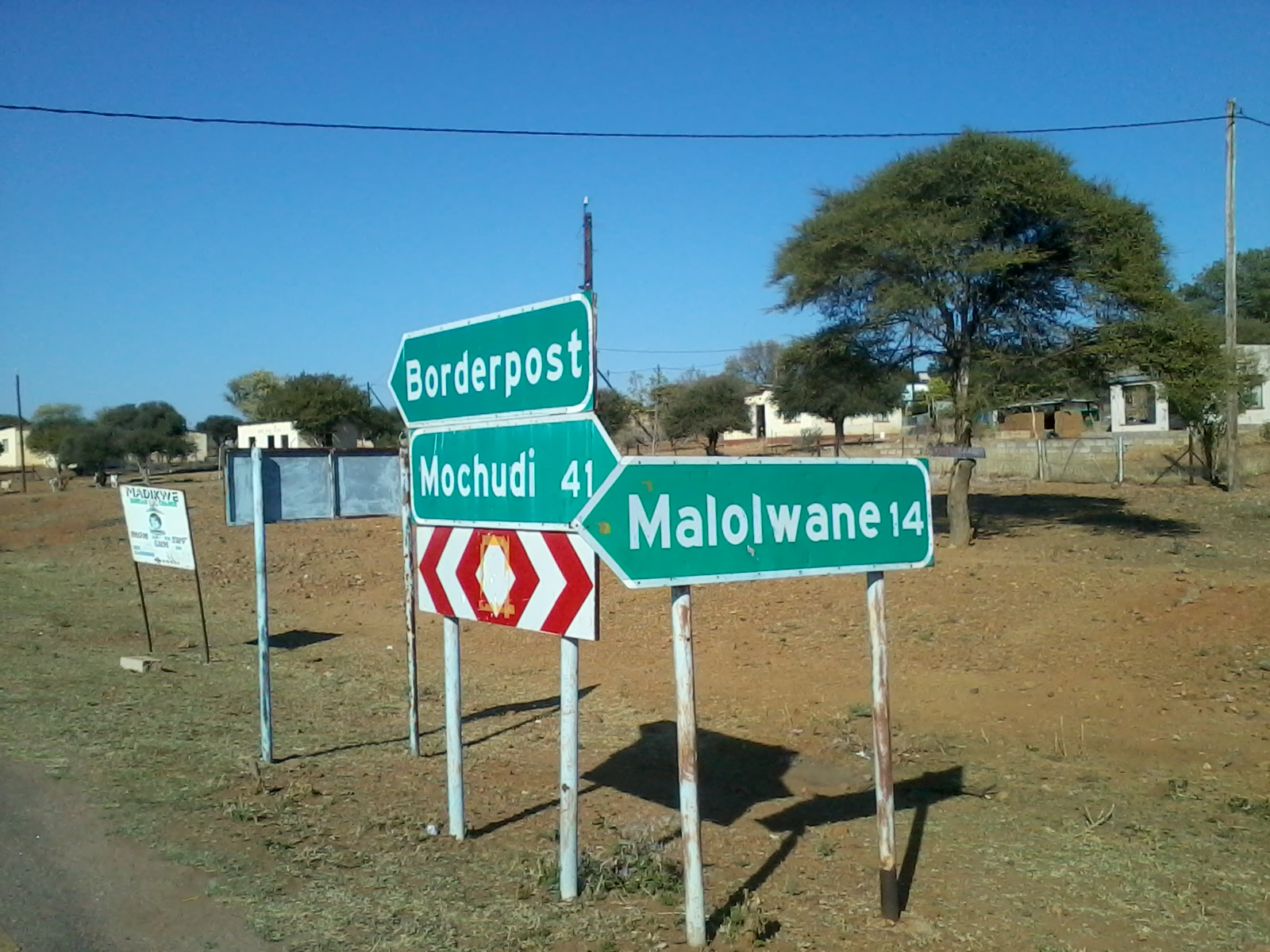
Malolwane "Ko Dinokeng"

Malolwane is a village in Kgatleng District of Botswana. The village is located 70 km east of Gaborone, and the population was 2,369 in the 2001 census.
