= William Njobvu =

Zambian footballer (born 1987)

Personal information
- Full name: William Njobvu
- Date of birth: 4 March 1987 (age 39)
- Place of birth: Lusaka, Zambia
- Height: 1.79 m (5 ft 10 1/2 in)
- Position: Midfielder

Team information
- Current team: Zanaco

Senior career*
Years	Team	Apps	(Gls)
2007–2009	Lusaka Dynamos	57	(5)
2009–2012	Ironi Kiryat Shmona	70	(7)
2012–2013	Hapoel Be'er Sheva	8	(1)
2013–2014	Enosis Neon Paralimni	10	(0)
2014–2015	Beitar Tel Aviv Ramla	17	(0)
2016	Power Dynamos		
2017	Kabwe Warriors		
2018–2019	National Assembly		
2019–2020	Nkwazi		
2020–	Zanaco		

International career
2008–2013	Zambia	22	(1)
- * Club domestic league appearances and goals

William Njobvu (born 4 March 1987) is a Zambian football midfielder who played for Zanaco. Njovu also played for Hapoel Ironi Kiryat Shmona in Israel and Lusaka Dynamos in Zambia before signing a five-year contract with the Israeli team effective since July 2009. He scored against Spain in the 2007 FIFA Youth World Cup where Zambia received a bye to the zambianfootball.net.

== International career ==
=== International goals ===
Scores and results list Zambia's goal tally first.

No.	Date	Venue	Opponent	Score	Result	Competition
1.	29 September 2007	Lucas Masterpieces Moripe Stadium, Pretoria, South Africa	Mozambique	3–0	3–0	2007 COSAFA Cup

== Honours ==
Lusaka Dynamos

- Zambian Challenge Cup: 2008

Hapoel Ironi Kiryat Shmona

- Toto Cup: 2009–10, 2010–11, 2011–12
- Liga Leumit: 2009–10
- Israeli Premier League: 2011–12
