= Paymaster Dennison =

Motswana footballer

Personal information
- Full name: William Dennison
- Date of birth: 30 September 1954
- Place of birth: Mahalapye District, Bechuanaland (now Botswana)
- Date of death: before 2007
- Position: Right midfielder

Senior career*
Years	Team	Apps	(Gls)
- Real Swingers
–1972	Mahalapye Queens Park Rangers		
1972–1983	Notwane		
1983–	Paymaster Spurs		

International career
1972–1976	Botswana XI (Non-CAF)	?	(1)
1976	Botswana	2+	(0)

Managerial career
- 2000: Botswana social welfare national team
- * Club domestic league appearances and goals

William Dennison, nicknamed "Paymaster" and also known as Willie Dennyson, (30 September 1954 – before 2007) was a Motswana footballer and manager who played as a right midfielder.

== Early life ==
William "Paymaster" Dennison was born on 30 September 1954 in Mahalapye District, Bechuanaland (now Botswana) and his family moved to Gaborone shortly after. He completed his education between 1958 and 1971 at Thornhill Primary School and Gaborone Secondary School.

== Club career ==
He joined Real Swingers during the 1960s and then transferred to Mahalapye Queens Park Rangers.

At the age of eighteen in 1972, he joined Notwane and eventually became club captain.

He won both the 1978 Botswana Premier League and was a finalist in the 1978 Botswana Challenge Cup. He subsequently represented Notwane in the 1979 African Cup Winners' Cup where the club lost 6–6 on aggregate in the first round due to the away goals rule against Maseru United from Lesotho.

In November 1983, Notwane were fifth in the Botswana Premier League and Dennison left the club shortly after.

In 1983 he formed his own team Paymaster Spurs; he retired from football at Paymaster Spurs.

== International career ==
Dennison represented Botswana between 1972 and 1976, and he was the captain of the national team in 1972. He scored during the 4–3 victory against Swaziland on 30 September 1974, and he played in the first two official matches after Botswana became a CAF member which were the 7–1 and 3–0 losses against Malawi on 13 and 17 September 1976.

== Personal life and legacy ==
His nephew is "Chicken" Dennison.

Dennison was voted in 2006 by the Botswana Football Association as the best all-time player from Botswana, and he was posthumously given the award by CAF in 2007. In August 2021, he made the starting eleven of the IFFHS All-Time Botswana Men’s Dream Team.

== Honours ==
Notwane

- Botswana Premier League: 1978
- Botswana Challenge Cup: Finalist in 1978
