= Tebogo Sosome =

Motswana footballer

Personal information
- Full name: Tebogo Sebino Sosome
- Date of birth: 27 August 1987 (age 39)
- Place of birth: Shoshong, Botswana
- Height: 1.82 m (6 ft 0 in)
- Position: Defender

Team information
- Current team: Jwaneng Galaxy

Senior career*
Years	Team	Apps	(Gls)
2012–2014	Gaborone United		
2014–	Jwaneng Galaxy		

International career^{‡}
2015–2018	Botswana	21	(0)
- * Club domestic league appearances and goals as of 3 October 2021 ‡ National team caps and goals as of 3 October 2021

Tebogo Sosome (born 27 August 1987) is a Motswana footballer who plays as a defender for Jwaneng Galaxy.
