= Nelson Gabolwelwe =

Motswana footballer

Personal information
- Full name: Nelson Gabolwelwe
- Date of birth: 3 September 1977 (age 49)
- Place of birth: Botswana
- Height: 1.80 m (5 ft 11 in)
- Positions: Left back; left midfielder

Senior career*
Years	Team	Apps	(Gls)
2002–2009	Botswana Defence Force XI		

International career^{‡}
1998–2008	Botswana	48	(3)
- * Club domestic league appearances and goals as of 29 August 2009 ‡ National team caps and goals as of 29 August 2009

Nelson "Viola" Gabolwelwe (born 3 September 1977) is a Motswana former footballer who played for Botswana Defence Force XI in the Mascom Premier League.
