= John Mdluli =

Swazi footballer (born 1972)

John Mdluli (born 14 July 1972) is a liSwati former professional footballer who played as a forward for clubs in South Africa and Israel.

== Club career ==
Mdluli was one of the top scorers in 2006 in Eswatini (then Swaziland).

A goal he scored while playing for Hapoel Jerusalem against Maccabi Ironi Kiryat Ata in 2001 was voted for the goal of the decade by Hapoel Jerusalem Supporters.

== International career ==
With the Eswatini national team, Mdluli participated at the 2001 COSAFA Cup.
