= Sageby Sandaka =

Zimbabwean footballer (born 1985)

Sageby Sandaka (born 17 June 1985) is a retired Zimbabwean football striker.

== Career ==
Sandaka began playing club football in Zimbabwe. He moved to Botswana side Gaborone United in 2006, where he was top league goal-scorer with 14 goals in 13 matches.

He has been capped for the Zimbabwean national team.

== Clubs ==
- 2003–2005: (Zimbabwe) Amazulu FC
- 2005–2006: (Zimbabwe) Monomotapa United FC
- 2006–2010: (Botswana) Gaborone United
- 2011: (Botswana) Mochudi Centre Chiefs
- 2011–2012: (Botswana) BMC Lobatse
- 2012–2013: (Botswana) Gaborone United
- 2013–2015: (Botswana) BMC Lobatse
