= Francis Chandida =

Zimbabwean footballer (born 1979)

Personal information
- Date of birth: 28 May 1979 (age 47)
- Place of birth: Bulawayo, Zimbabwe
- Height: 1.81 m (5 ft 11 in)
- Position: Midfielder

Senior career*
Years	Team	Apps	(Gls)
2001-2002	Shabanie Mine F.C.		
2003-2004	Dynamos F.C.		
2005-2006	Buymore FC		

International career
2001-2006	Zimbabwe MNT	19	(5)
Medal record
Men's football
Representing Zimbabwe
COSAFA Cup
Winner	2005 Southern Africa
- * Club domestic league appearances and goals

Francis Chandida (born 28 May 1979) is a former Zimbabwean football midfielder.

He has been capped for the Zimbabwean national team. He scored the winning goal in the 2005 COSAFA Cup, and was on the Zimbabwean squad for the 2006 African Cup of Nations. He was an influential figure in the Zimbabwe national team in the mid-2000s.

Chandida played for Shababie Mine from 2000 to 2002 and he won the Bp league Cup and played in the zifa unity cup final with the asbestos miners. In 2002, he joined Dynamos for a record ZW$4.5 million. He played for 2 seasons before he joined another Harare-based outfit, Buymore. Despite playing all the qualifying games for Tunisia Afcon 2004 tournament, Chandida missed out on the final selection for the tournament. In 2006, he was part of the final squad for the Afcon tournament.

== Clubs ==
- 2001–2002: (Zimbabwe) Shabanie Mine FC
- 2003–2004: (Zimbabwe) Dynamos FC
- 2005–2006: (Zimbabwe) Buymore FC

== Honours ==
Zimbabwe

- COSAFA Cup: 2005
