= Masego Ntshingane =

Motswana footballer

Personal information
- Full name: Masego Ntshingane
- Date of birth: 14 November 1978 (age 47)
- Place of birth: Botswana
- Position: Midfielder

Senior career*
Years	Team	Apps	(Gls)
1996–2004	Mogoditshane Fighters		
2004–2005	Auburn Tigers		
2005–	Mogoditshane Fighters		

International career
1997–2006	Botswana	16	(1)
- * Club domestic league appearances and goals

Masego Ntshingane (born 14 November 1978) is a Motswana former footballer who played as a midfielder. He played for the Botswana national football team between 1997 and 2006. Besides Botswana, he has played in the United States.
