= Oliver Pikati =

Motswana footballer

Personal information
- Full name: Oliver Pikati
- Date of birth: 19 May 1973 (age 53)
- Place of birth: Botswana
- Position: Striker

Senior career*
Years	Team	Apps	(Gls)
1993–2006	Police XI		

International career
1994–2002	Botswana	5	(2)
- * Club domestic league appearances and goals

Oliver Pikati (born 19 May 1973) is a Motswana former footballer who played as a striker. He played for the Botswana national football team between 1994 and 2002.
