= Albert Mbano =

Zimbabwean footballer (born 1969)

Personal information
- Date of birth: 30 November 1969 (age 56)
- Position: Forward

Senior career*
Years	Team	Apps	(Gls)
2002–2005	Shabanie Mine		
2006	Black Rhinos		
2007	CAPS United		

International career
2003–2004	Zimbabwe	6	(2)
- * Club domestic league appearances and goals

Albert Mbano (born 30 November 1969) is a retired Zimbabwean football striker.

== Honours ==
Individual

- Afro-Asian Games Top Scorer (with 4 goals)
