= Brian Badza =

Zimbabwean footballer (born 1979)

Personal information
- Date of birth: 23 June 1979 (age 47)
- Position: Forward

International career
Years	Team	Apps	(Gls)
2004–2006	Zimbabwe	15	(1)

Brian Badza (born 23 June 1979) is a former Zimbabwean football striker.

He has been capped for the Zimbabwean national team. He was in the Zimbabwean squad for the 2006 African Cup of Nations.

He played domestically for Motor Action FC (2002) and CAPS United FC (2003–2005, 2006–2008) and in Belgium for K.F.C. Germinal Beerschot (2005–06).
