= Molepolole Stadium =

Multi-use stadium in Molepolole, Botswana

Molepolole Sports Complex
- Interactive map of Molepolole Sports Complex
- Location: Molepolole, Botswana
- Coordinates: 24.383626°S 25.537693°E
- Capacity: 6,600
- Surface: Artificial

Molepolole Sports Complex is a stadium in Molepolole, Botswana. The multi sports complex consists of a track and field stadium known for its hosting of some football games from the national league. The pitch surface is artificial and it had to be relaid in 2008 at FIFA's request. In 2010, it was chosen as one of two host stadiums for the COSAFA Under-20 Challenge.
