= University of Botswana Stadium =

Multi-use stadium in Gaborone, Botswana

- Interactive map of University of Botswana Stadium
- Location: Gaborone, Botswana
- Coordinates: 24.655114°S 25.940571°E
- Capacity: 10,000

Tenant
- Uniao Flamengo Santos F.C.

University of Botswana Stadium is a multi-use stadium in Gaborone, Botswana, owned by the University of Botswana. It is used mostly for football matches and serves as the home stadium of Uniao Flamengo Santos F.C. The stadium holds 8,500 people. It is located across the road from the two grounds (Oval 1 and Oval 2) of the Botswana Cricket Association Oval.
