= Estádio da Machava =

Building in Africa

- Interactive map of Estádio da Machava
- Former names: Estádio Salazar
- Address: Matola; Mozambique
- Coordinates: 25.9172°S 32.5263°E
- Owner: Clube Ferroviário de Maputo
- Capacity: 45,000
- Type: Multi-purpose
- Current use: football matches

Construction
- Opened: 30 June 1968
- Years active: 1968–present

The Estádio da Machava is a multi-purpose stadium in Machava, a mainly residential subdivision of the city of Matola, in the outskirts of Maputo, Mozambique. It is used for football matches and can hold 45,000 spectators.

The stadium was built by the Portuguese colonial government of Mozambique and inaugurated as Estádio Salazar, named after the Portuguese dictator António de Oliveira Salazar, on 30 June 1968, with a match between Portugal and Brazil, which the latter, formally the visitors, won 2:0.

It was in Machava that the Declaration of National Independence of Mozambique took place, on June 25, 1975.

It is now owned by Clube Ferroviário de Maputo.
