= Somhlolo National Stadium =

Multi-use stadium in Lobamba, Eswatini

Coordinates: 26°26′34.44″S 31°12′20.23″E

- Interactive map of Somhlolo National Stadium
- Full name: Somhlolo National Stadium
- Location: Lobamba, Eswatini
- Capacity: <10,000
- Surface: artificial turf

Construction
- Built: 1968
- Renovated: 2022

Tenant
- Eswatini national football team

Somhlolo National Stadium is a multi-purpose stadium in Lobamba, Eswatini. Built in 1968, it has artificial turf and holds under 10,000 fans. It is used for soccer and rugby matches, and athletics events.

The stadium is named after King Sobhuza I, also known as Somhlolo, who moved his people into the region now known as Eswatini, and is considered the father of the country.

It is the largest stadium in the country. It was banned by CAF from hosting international matches in 2019, and was closed for renovations in 2022. It reopened in January 2024.
