= 2016 COSAFA Cup squads =

Below are the squads for the 2016 COSAFA Cup, which took place from 11 June to 25 June 2016. The player's age and clubs are as of the opening day of the tournament. Players marked (c) were named as captain for their national team for the tournament.

== Angola ==
Head coach: Samy Matias

No.	Pos.	Player	Date of birth (age)	Club
	GK	Josue	17 July 2000 (aged 15)	(Angolan Football Federation) Kabuscorp
	GK	Landú Miguel		(Angolan Football Federation) Progresso Sambizanga
	DF	Abdul	7 April 1994 (aged 22)	(Angolan Football Federation) Petro Atlético
	DF	Mona	26 July 1997 (aged 18)	(Angolan Football Federation) Primeiro de Agosto
	DF	Nandinho	25 May 1998 (aged 18)	(Angolan Football Federation) Kabuscorp
	DF	Tomé Pedro	22 July 1998 (aged 17)	(Angolan Football Federation) Petro Atlético
	DF	Pepé Alves	17 September 1999 (aged 16)	(Angolan Football Federation) Progresso Sambizanga
	DF	Calebi Yanda	20 April 1999 (aged 17)	(Angolan Football Federation) Interclube
	DF	Kinito	13 March 1998 (aged 18)	(Angolan Football Federation) Interclube
	MF	Carlinhos	19 March 1995 (aged 21)	(Angolan Football Federation) Petro Atlético
	MF	Além	6 December 1997 (aged 18)	(Angolan Football Federation) Petro Atlético
	MF	Daniel 'GTI'	4 April 1997 (aged 19)	(Angolan Football Federation) Petro Atlético
	MF	Herenilson	27 August 1996 (aged 19)	(Angolan Football Federation) Petro Atlético
	MF	Nelson da Luz	4 February 1998 (aged 18)	(Angolan Football Federation) Primeiro de Agosto
	MF	Zinedine Catraio	17 June 1998 (aged 17)	(Angolan Football Federation) Primeiro de Agosto
	FW	Filhão	14 June 1995 (aged 20)	(Angolan Football Federation) ASA
	FW	Atanásio	3 April 1997 (aged 19)	(Angolan Football Federation) Interclube
	FW	Chabalala	23 September 1999 (aged 16)	(Angolan Football Federation) Académica Lobito
	FW	Vá	24 April 1998 (aged 18)	(Angolan Football Federation) Progresso Sambizanga
	FW	Popó	4 April 1998 (aged 18)	(Angolan Football Federation) Progresso Sambizanga
	MF	José Miranda	30 July 1997 (aged 18)	(Angolan Football Federation) Sagrada Esperança

== Botswana ==
Head coach: (England) Peter Butler

No.	Pos.	Player	Date of birth (age)	Club
	GK	Kabelo Dambe	10 May 1990 (aged 26)	(Botswana Football Association) Township Rollers
	GK	Mwampole Masule	5 September 1991 (aged 24)	(Botswana Football Association) Township Rollers
	DF	Mosha Gaolaolwe	25 December 1993 (aged 22)	(Botswana Football Association) BDF XI
	DF	Boitumelo Mafoko	11 February 1982 (aged 34)	(Botswana Football Association) Jwaneng Galaxy
	DF	Tebogo Sodome	27 August 1987 (aged 28)	(Botswana Football Association) Jwaneng Galaxy
	DF	Olekantse Mambo	8 December 1989 (aged 26)	(Botswana Football Association) Orapa United
	DF	Keolopile Molemi	3 April 1994 (aged 22)	(Botswana Football Association) BDF XI
	DF	Lesenya Ramoraka	4 April 1994 (aged 22)	(Botswana Football Association) Orapa United
	DF	Thato Kebue	29 May 1997 (aged 19)	(Botswana Football Association) Mochudi Centre Chiefs
	MF	Kabelo Seakanyeng	25 June 1993 (aged 22)	(Botswana Football Association) Gaborone United
	MF	Lebogang Ditsele	20 April 1996 (aged 20)	(Botswana Football Association) Township Rollers
	MF	Lemponye Tshireletso	26 August 1987 (aged 28)	(Botswana Football Association) Mochudi Centre Chiefs
	MF	Onkabetse Makgantai	1 July 1995 (aged 20)	(Botswana Football Association) Orapa United
	FW	Lemogang Maswena	5 February 1991 (aged 25)	(Botswana Football Association) Orapa United
	MF	Tapiwa Gadibolae	26 February 1993 (aged 23)	(Botswana Football Association) Botswana Police XI
	MF	Lesego Galenamotlhale	29 July 1986 (aged 29)	(Botswana Football Association) Mochudi Centre Chiefs
	MF	Joel Mogorosi	2 August 1984 (aged 31)	(Botswana Football Association) Township Rollers
	FW	Thabang Sesinyi	15 October 1992 (aged 23)	(Botswana Football Association) Orapa United
	FW	Hendrick Moyo	9 May 1989 (aged 27)	(Botswana Football Association) Gaborone United
	FW	Omaatla Kebatho	16 June 1993 (aged 22)	(South African Football Association) Vasco da Gama

== Democratic Republic of the Congo ==
Head coach: Florent Ibengé

No.	Pos.	Player	Date of birth (age)	Club
	GK	Herve Lomboto	27 October 1989 (aged 26)	(Congolese Football Federation) AC Léopards
	GK	Ley Matampi	10 April 1984 (aged 32)	(Congolese Association Football Federation) DC Motema Pembe
	DF	Junior Baometu	9 May 1994 (aged 22)	(Congolese Association Football Federation) St Eloi Lupopo
	DF	Bangala Litombo	12 April 1994 (aged 22)	(Congolese Association Football Federation) DC Motema Pembe
	DF	Joyce Lomalisa	18 June 1993 (aged 22)	(Congolese Association Football Federation) AS Vita Club
	DF	Bobo Ungenda	13 November 1989 (aged 26)	(Angolan Football Federation) Kabuscorp
	DF	Rudy Makwekwe	27 July 1994 (aged 21)	(Congolese Association Football Federation) AS Vita Club
	DF	Botuli Bompunga	30 January 1992 (aged 24)	(Congolese Association Football Federation) AS Vita Club
	DF	Franck Mfuki	2 July 1993 (aged 22)	(Congolese Association Football Federation) MK Etanchéité
	MF	Nelson Munganga	27 July 1993 (aged 22)	(Congolese Association Football Federation) AS Vita Club
	MF	Lema Mabidi	11 June 1993 (aged 23)	(Royal Moroccan Football Federation) Raja Casablanca
	MF	Docksa Gikanji	21 August 1990 (aged 25)	(Congolese Association Football Federation) DC Motema Pembe
	MF	Guy Lusadisu	28 February 1982 (aged 34)	(Congolese Association Football Federation) AS Vita Club
	MF	Miché Mika	13 September 1996 (aged 19)	(Congolese Association Football Federation) CS Don Bosco
	FW	Cédrick Ngulubi	22 October 1992 (aged 23)	(Congolese Association Football Federation) Sharks XI
	FW	Bukasa Bakangila	24 December 1991 (aged 24)	(Congolese Association Football Federation) SM Sanga Balende
	FW	Mukoko Batezadio	24 October 1992 (aged 23)	(Congolese Association Football Federation) AS Vita Club
	FW	Zacharie Mombo	12 December 1992 (aged 23)	(Congolese Association Football Federation) MK Etanchéité
	FW	André Bukia	3 March 1995 (aged 21)	(Portuguese Football Federation) Boavista
	FW	Lobi Manzoki	12 December 1994 (aged 21)	(Congolese Association Football Federation) Dauphins Noirs

== Lesotho ==
Head coach:

No.	Pos.	Player	Date of birth (age)	Club
	GK	Daniel Jousse		
	DF	Basia Makepe		
	DF	Mafa Moremoholo		
	DF	Kopano Tseka		
	MF	Hlompho Kalake		
	MF	Mabuti Potloane		
	MF	Kefoue Mahula		
	FW	Jane Thaba-Ntso		
	FW	Tsepo Seturumane		
	MF	Jeremea Kamela		
	FW	Tumelo Khutlang		
	GK	Litheboho Mokhehle		
	MF	Sepiriti David Malefane		
	MF	Phafa Tsosane		
	FW	Motebang Sera		
	DF	Motlomelo Mkwanazi		
	MF	Montoeli Sonopo		
	FW	Thabo Seakhoa		

== Madagascar ==
Head coach: Auguste Raux

No.	Pos.	Player	Date of birth (age)	Club
	DF	Tantely Sandratriniaina		
	DF	Randrianiaiana Tantley		
	MF	Michael Fetranianina		
	MF	Ando Manoelantsoa		
	MF	Jaotambo Bourahim		
	FW	Sarivahy Vombola		
	MF	Rinjala Raherinaivo		
	DF	Francois Randrianmonjanahary		
	GK	Chretien Andriamifehy		
	DF	Valery Solo Rakotoarinosy		
	FW	Tojo Claudel Fanomezana		
	GK	Eddit Bastia		
	DF	Fenosoa Ratolojanahary		
	MF	Morelin Raveoarisona		
	FW	Florent Rajaoniasy		
	GK	Manda Ratsimbazafy		
	MF	Elefoni		
	DF	Andy Randrianarisoa		

== Malawi ==
Head coach: Ernest Mtawali

No.	Pos.	Player	Date of birth (age)	Club
	GK	Charles Swini		
	DF	Stanley Sanudi		
	DF	Franci Mlimbika		
	FW	Chiukepo Msowoya		
	MF	Rafick Namvera		
	DF	Harry Nyirenda		
	MF	Joseph Kamwendo		
	FW	Gabadhino Mhango		
	DF	Miracle Gabeya		
	MF	Isaac Kalaiti		
	FW	Gerald Phiri, Jr.		
	GK	Ernest Kakhobwe		
	DF	Wonderful Jeremani		
	FW	Muhammad Sulumba		
	DF	Yamikani Livison Fodya		
	FW	Peter Wadabwa		
	DF	Pilirani Zonda		
	MF	John Banda		
	MF	Dalitso Sailesi		

== Mauritius ==
Head coach: Joe Tshupula

No.	Pos.	Player	Date of birth (age)	Club
	GK	Kevin Jean-Louis		
	DF	Louis Marco Dorza		
	DF	Damien Balisson		
	DF	Francis Rasolofonirina		
	MF	Jonathan Pierre Bru		
	MF	Peter Bell		
	MF	Kevin Chan-Yu-Tin		
	FW	Jean Sophie		
	MF	Guiyano Chiffone		
	DF	Louis Brendon Citorah		
	DF	Emmanuel Vincent Jean		
	DF	Jean Emmanuel Cedric Permal		
	MF	Jean Langue		
	MF	Christopher L’enclume		
	MF	Laval Rungassamy		
	MF	Luther Rose		
	DF	Kylian Yrnard		
	GK	Aboobakar Augustin		

== Mozambique ==
Head coach:

No.	Pos.	Player	Date of birth (age)	Club
	GK	José Guirrugo		
	DF	João Mazive		
	DF	Teca Jorge		
	FW	Gildo Vilanculos		
	FW	Manuel Correia		
	DF	Kleiton Arge		
	FW	Apso Manjate		
	FW	Luis Miquissone		
	MF	Lourenco Waruma		
	DF	João Mussica		
	MF	Pedro Timbe		
	DF	Bruno Langa		
	FW	Nelson Divrassone		
	FW	Alexandre Guambe		
	GK	Nelson Logomale		
	DF	Sitoe Salomone		
	FW	Elias Macamo		
	FW	Dayson Agostinho		
	FW	Luis Parkim		
	DF	Salomão Mondlane		

== Namibia ==
Head coach: Ricardo Mannetti

No.	Pos.	Player	Date of birth (age)	Club
	GK	Maximilian Mbaeva		
	DF	Denzil Haoseb		
	DF	Ananias Gebhardt		
	DF	Ferdinand Karongee		
	FW	Deon Hotto		
6	MF	Mohamed Charles Ouseb	21	(Namibia Football Association) Valencia FC
	MF	Wangu Gome		
	MF	Ronald Ketjijere		
	FW	Peter Shalulile		
	DF	Larry Horaeb		
	FW	Hendrik Somaeb		
	DF	Dynamo Fredericks		
	FW	Absalom Iimbondi		
	MF	Oswaldo Xamseb		
	FW	Terdius Uiseb		
	GK	Charles Uirab		
	FW	Itamunua Keimuine		
	DF	Teberius Lombaard		
	MF	Edmund Kambanda		

== Seychelles ==
Head coach: Ralph Jean-Louis

No.	Pos.	Player	Date of birth (age)	Club
	GK	Jose Vincent Euphrasie		
	DF	Yannick Manoo		
	FW	Nelson Laurence		
	DF	Jones Joubert		
	DF	Benoit Marie		
	MF	Gervais Waye-Hive		
	FW	Achille Henriette		
	MF	Carl Hopprich		
	DF	Daniel Maillet		
	FW	Colin Bibi		
	DF	Andrew Onezia		
	MF	Basil Bertin		
	FW	Dine Suzette		
	MF	Keith Carolie		
	MF	Colin Esther		
	MF	Karl Hall		
	FW	Tamboo Elijah		
	GK	Gino Melanie		
	DF	Marlon Sophola		
	MF	Lucas Panayi		

== South Africa ==
Head coach: Shakes Mashaba

No.	Pos.	Player	Date of birth (age)	Club
	GK	Reyaad Pieterse		
	DF	Rivaldo Coetzee		
	DF	Tshepo Rikhotso		
	MF	Lebogang Phiri		
	DF	Abbubaker Mobara		
	FW	Gift Motupa		
	DF	Thembela Sikhakhane		
	DF	Tebogo Moerane		
	FW	Thembinkosi Lorch		
	FW	Judas Moseamedi		
	DF	Maphosa Modiba		
	GK	Nkosingiphile Gumede		
	DF	Siphesishle Stuurman		
	DF	Repo Malepe		
	FW	Thabiso Kutumela		
	FW	Menzi Masuku		
	MF	Phumlani Ntshangase		
	MF	Deolin Mekoa		
	GK	Jody February		

== Swaziland ==
Head coach: Harris Bulunga

No.	Pos.	Player	Date of birth (age)	Club
	GK	Sandile Ginndiza		
	DF	Sifiso Mabila		
	FW	Muzi Dlmaini		
	DF	Siyabonga Mdluli		
	DF	Sanele Mkhweli		
	MF	Felix Badenhorst		
	FW	Sabelo Ndzinisa		
	MF	Mxcolisi Lukhele		
	DF	Machawe Dlamini		
	MF	Njubulo Ndlovo		
	MF	Tony Tsabedze		
	GK	Nhlanhla Gwebu		
	DF	Sihumbuzo Ntimane		
	MF	Sibonginkosi Gamendze		
	MF	Banele Sikhondze		
	FW	Phiwayinkhosi Dlamini		
	DF	Phumlani Dlamini		(Eswatini Football Association) Manzini Sundowns F.C.
	FW	Wonder Nhleko		
	DF	Mandla Palma		

== Zambia ==
Head coach: George Lwandamina

No.	Pos.	Player	Date of birth (age)	Club
	GK	Danny Munyao		(Football Association of Zambia) Red Arrows
	MF	Donashano Malama		(Football Association of Zambia) Nkana
	DF	Buchizya Mfune		(Football Association of Zambia) Green Buffaloes
	DF	Adrian Chama		(Football Association of Zambia) Green Buffaloes
	DF	Emmanuel Museka		(Football Association of Zambia) Lusaka Tigers
	MF	Charles Zulu		(Football Association of Zambia) Zanaco
	MF	Paul Katema		(Football Association of Zambia) Red Arrows
	MF	Salulani Phiri		(Football Association of Zambia) Zanaco
	MF	Steward Chikandiwa		(Football Association of Zambia) Nkwazi
	FW	Conlyde Luchanga		(Football Association of Zambia) Lusaka Dynamos
	FW	Festus Mbewe		(Football Association of Zambia) Red Arrows
	DF	Benedict Chepeshi		(Football Association of Zambia) Red Arrows
	DF	Boyd Mkandawire		(Football Association of Zambia) Napsa Stars
	FW	Patson Daka		(Football Association of Zambia) Power Dynamos
	DF	Webster Mulenga		(Football Association of Zambia) Red Arrows
	GK	Rachar Kola		(Football Association of Zambia) Zanaco
	MF	Spencer Sautu		(Football Association of Zambia) Green Eagles
	MF	Jacob Ngulube		(Football Association of Zambia) Nkana
	GK	Lawrence Mulenga		(Football Association of Zambia) Kabwe Warriors
	MF	Clatous Chama		(Football Association of Zambia) Zesco United

== Zimbabwe ==
Head coach: Callisto Pasuwa

No.	Pos.	Player	Date of birth (age)	Club
	GK	Tatenda Mukuruva		
	DF	Hardlife Zvirekwi		
	DF	Bruce Kangwa		
	DF	Elisha Muroiwa		
	DF	Teenage Hadebe		
	MF	Nqobizitha Masuku		
	MF	Danny Phiri		
	FW	Marshal Mudehwe		
	MF	Obadiah Tarumbwa		
	MF	Ronald Pfumbidzai		
	FW	Charlton Mashumba		
	GK	Bernard Donovan		
	DF	Lawrence Mhlanga		
	MF	Raphael Manuvire		
	MF	King Nadolo		
	MF	Tafadzwa Kutinyu		
	FW	Farai Madhanaga		
	MF	Talent Chawapiwa		
