= 2015 COSAFA Cup =

Tournament details
- Host country: South Africa
- Dates: 17–30 May 2015
- Teams: 14
- Venues: 2 (in 2 host cities)

Final positions
- Champions: Namibia (1st title)
- Runners-up: Mozambique
- Third place: Madagascar
- Fourth place: Botswana

Tournament statistics
- Matches played: 23
- Goals scored: 46 (2 per match)
- Top scorer: (Madagascar) Sarivahy Vombola (5 goals)
- Best player: (Namibia) Wangu Gome
- Best goalkeeper: (Namibia) Virgil Vries

The 2015 COSAFA Cup was the 15th edition of the COSAFA Cup, an international football competition consisting of national teams of member nations of the Council of Southern Africa Football Associations (COSAFA). It was hosted by South Africa in May 2015. All matches took place in the North West province.

== Participating nations ==
National team	FIFA Ranking (February 2015)	Entry round
Mauritius	185	Group stage
Seychelles	187	Group stage
Swaziland	165	Group stage
Madagascar	148	Group stage
Zimbabwe	119	Group stage
Namibia	111	Group stage
Lesotho	125	Group stage
Tanzania (invitee)	107	Group stage
Botswana	105	Quarter final
Malawi	93	Quarter final
Mozambique	90	Quarter final
Zambia	60	Quarter final
South Africa	56	Quarter final
Ghana (invitee)	25	Quarter final

Did not enter

- Angola
- Comoros

== Venues ==
On 15 May 2015, COSAFA announced that fixtures would no longer be hosted at Olympia Park due to ongoing construction work and would instead be hosted by Royal Bafokeng Sports Palace in Phokeng.

Moruleng	2015 COSAFA Cup is located in North West (South African province)	Phokeng
Moruleng Stadium	2015 COSAFA Cup is located in North West (South African province)	Royal Bafokeng Sports Palace
Capacity: 20,000	2015 COSAFA Cup is located in North West (South African province)	Capacity: 45,000
25.156667°S 27.175556°E	2015 COSAFA Cup is located in North West (South African province)	25.578913°S 27.161061°E

== Draw procedure ==
COSAFA described the procedure thus:

- Draw commences for GROUP ROUND with 4 seeded teams (TZ; NAM; ZIM; LES) being placed in 1 bowl and the remaining 4 teams in the second bowl
- First ball out of seeded bowl becomes the seed for Group A and second ball is seeded in Group B, similarly with the remaining 2 balls in the seeded bowl
- We continue by drawing balls out to populate positions A3, A4 & B3, B4
- Fixtures are populated electronically as each ball is drawn
- MC talks through the Group Round results whilst the Draw Master prepares the balls for the Quarter-Final Draw
- We now have 6 new teams plus 2 teams which read "Winner Group A" and "Winner Group B"
- The 4 seeded QF teams go into bowl 1 and the unseeded teams incl the Group round winners go into bowl 2
- The fixtures for QF are established by drawing from bowl 1 (GHANA; SA; ZAM; MOZ) followed by bowl 2 (unseeded teams) until all 4 fixtures are populated

The draw took place on 26 February 2015 and was televised by South Africa's SuperSport 4.

== Group stage ==
Seeded	Unseeded
Lesotho; Namibia; Tanzania; Zimbabwe	Madagascar; Mauritius; Seychelles; Swaziland

=== Group A ===
Pos	Team	Pld	W	D	L	GF	GA	GD	Pts	Qualification
1	Namibia	3	2	1	0	6	1	+5	7	Advance to knockout stage
2	Zimbabwe	3	2	0	1	4	4	0	6	
3	Mauritius	3	1	0	2	1	4	−3	3	
4	Seychelles	3	0	1	2	0	2	−2	1	

First match(es) will be played: 17 May 2015. Source:
17 May 2015
15:00

Namibia	0–0	Seychelles
	Report

Moruleng Stadium
Referee: Hamada Nampiandraza (Madagascar)
17 May 2015
17:30

Zimbabwe	2–0	Mauritius
Rusere 28'; Chitiyo 66'	Report

Moruleng Stadium
Referee: Joshua Bondo (Botswana)

19 May 2015
17:00

Seychelles	0–1	Zimbabwe
	Report	Talent 52'

Moruleng Stadium
Referee: Simanga Nhleko (Swaziland)
19 May 2015
19:30

Namibia	2–0	Mauritius
Shilongo 4', 65'	Report

Moruleng Stadium
Referee: Osiase Koto (Lesotho)

21 May 2015
17:00

Namibia	4–1	Zimbabwe
Katjiukua 9'; Hotto 60', 67'; Urikhob 84'	Report	Manuvire 83'

Moruleng Stadium
Referee: Hamada Nampiandraza (Madagascar)
21 May 2015
17:00

Seychelles	0–1	Mauritius
	Report	Sophie 84'

Royal Bafokeng Sports Palace
Referee: Simanga Nhleko (Swaziland)

=== Group B ===
Pos	Team	Pld	W	D	L	GF	GA	GD	Pts	Qualification
1	Madagascar	3	2	1	0	5	2	+3	7	Advance to knockout stage
2	Swaziland	3	2	1	0	4	1	+3	7	
3	Lesotho	3	1	0	2	2	4	−2	3	
4	Tanzania (G)	3	0	0	3	0	4	−4	0	

First match(es) will be played: 17 May 2015. Source:
(G) Guests
18 May 2015
17:30

Lesotho	1–2	Madagascar
Thale 26'	Report	Vombola 38'; Rabehasinmbola 85'

Royal Bafokeng Sports Palace
Referee: Ruzive Ruzive (Zimbabwe)
18 May 2015
19:30

Tanzania	0–1	Swaziland
	Report	Mabila 44'

Royal Bafokeng Sports Palace
Referee: Nelson Fred (Seychelles)

20 May 2015
17:00

Madagascar	2–0	Tanzania
Rakotoharimalala 14'; Randriamanjaka 44'	Report

Royal Bafokeng Sports Palace
Referee: Duncan Lengani (Malawi)
20 May 2015
19:30

Lesotho	0–2	Swaziland
	Report	Sibandze 43'; Mkhontfo 66'

Royal Bafokeng Sports Palace
Referee: Wisdom Chewe (Zambia)

22 May 2015
17:00

Lesotho	1–0	Tanzania
Kamela 76'	Report

Moruleng Stadium
Referee: Joshua Bondo (Botswana)
22 May 2015
17:00

Madagascar	1–1	Swaziland
Randriamanjaka 7'	Report	Ndzinisa 79'

Royal Bafokeng Sports Palace
Referee: Ruzive Ruzive (Zimbabwe)

== Knockout stage ==
Ghana, South Africa, Zambia, Mozambique, Malawi and Botswana all received a bye to this stage.

Quarter-finals
24 May – Moruleng
Zambia	0 (4)
Namibia (pen.)	0 (5)
25 May – Phokeng
Ghana	1
Madagascar	2
24 May – Moruleng
South Africa	0 (6)
Botswana (pen.)	0 (7)
25 May – Phokeng
Mozambique (pen)	2 (5)
Malawi	2 (4)

Semi-finals
28 May – Moruleng
Namibia	3
Madagascar	2
28 May – Moruleng
Botswana	1
Mozambique	2

Final
30 May – Moruleng
Namibia	2
Mozambique	0
Third place
30 May – Moruleng
Madagascar	2
Botswana	1

=== Quarter-finals ===
Seeded	Unseeded
South Africa; Mozambique; Zambia; Ghana	Botswana; Malawi; Namibia; Madagascar

25 May 2015
15:00

Ghana	1–2	Madagascar
Darkwah 37'	report	28' Randriamanjaka; 90' Simouri

Royal Bafokeng Sports Palace
Referee: Joshua Bondo (Botswana)
25 May 2015
17:30

Mozambique	2–2	Malawi
Lucky Malata 10' (o.g.); Mzava 90+1' (o.g.)	report	51' Sulumba; 90' (pen.) Mzava
Penalties
Gildo (penalty missed); Hagi (penalty scored); Miquissone (penalty scored); Isac (penalty scored); Guambe (penalty missed); Norberto (penalty scored); Mahumane (penalty scored)	5–4	(penalty scored) Banda; (penalty scored) Mzava; (penalty missed) Kumwenda; (penalty missed) Fodya; (penalty scored) Kondowe; (penalty scored) Malata; (penalty missed) Sulumba

Royal Bafokeng Sports Palace
Referee: Simanga Nhleko (Swaziland)

24 May 2015
17:30

Zambia	0–0	Namibia
	report
Penalties
Mweene (penalty scored); Mtonga (penalty scored); Mbola (penalty missed); Ndhlovu (penalty scored); Katebe (penalty scored)	4–5	(penalty scored) Isaacks; (penalty scored) Stephanus; (penalty scored) Mwedihanga; (penalty scored) Ketjijere; (penalty scored) Hotto

Moruleng Stadium
Referee: Hamada Nampiandraza (Madagascar)
24 May 2015
19:30

South Africa	0–0	Botswana
	report
Penalties
Lark (penalty missed); Daniels (penalty scored) van Heerden (penalty scored); Motupa (penalty scored); Morena (penalty scored); Segolela (penalty scored); Madisha (penalty scored); Mngonyama (penalty missed)	6–7	(penalty scored) Nato; (penalty scored) Kgaswane; (penalty scored) Mogorosi; (penalty missed) Moyo; (penalty scored) Dambe; (penalty scored) Legwaila; (penalty scored) Koobake; (penalty scored) Gaolaolwe

Moruleng Stadium
Referee: Wisdom Chewe (Zambia)
- The winning quarter finalists proceed to the semi-finals.
- The losing quarter finalists proceed to the plate semi-finals.

=== Plate competition ===
Semi-finals
27 May – Moruleng
Zambia	3
Ghana	0
27 May – Moruleng
South Africa	0 (4)
Malawi (pen.)	0 (5)

Final
29 May – Phokeng
Zambia	0
Malawi	1

==== Plate semi-final ====
27 May 2015
17:00

Zambia	3–0	Ghana
Mwape 24'; Katebe 29'; Sinkala 42'	report

Moruleng Stadium
Referee: Nelson Fred (Seychelles)
27 May 2015
19:30

South Africa	0–0	Malawi
	report
Penalties
Daniels (penalty scored); Nyanda (penalty scored); Madisha (penalty scored); Van Heerden (penalty missed); Manayama (penalty scored); Nhlapo (penalty missed)	4–5	(penalty scored) Banda; (penalty scored) Mzava; (penalty scored) Mkanda; (penalty missed) Mhone; (penalty scored) Malata; (penalty scored) Ngalande

Moruleng Stadium
Referee: Norman Matemera (Zimbabwe)

==== Plate final ====
29 May 2015
17:00

Zambia	0–1	Malawi
	report	Mkanda 59'

Royal Bafokeng Sports Palace
Referee: Norman Matemera (Zimbabwe)

=== Semi-finals ===
28 May 2015
17:00

Namibia	3–2	Madagascar
Shilongo 2', 18'; Shalulile 83'	report	Vombola 24', 26'

Moruleng Stadium
Referee: Simanga Nhleko (Swaziland)
28 May 2015
19:30

Botswana	1–2	Mozambique
Kebatho 78'	report	Isac 65'; Parkim 88'

Moruleng Stadium
Referee: Duncan Lengani (Malawi)

=== Third place playoff ===
30 May 2015
15:00

Madagascar	2–1	Botswana
Vombola 16', 18'	report	Boy 84'

Moruleng Stadium
Referee: Wisdom Chewe (Zambia)

=== Final ===
30 May 2015
17:30

Namibia	2–0	Mozambique
Hotto 36', 74'	report

Moruleng Stadium
Referee: Hamada Nampiandraza (Madagascar)

== Awards ==
Top scorer

- (Madagascar) Sarivahy Vombola (5 goals)

Player of the Tournament

- (Namibia) Wangu Gome

Goalkeeper of the Tournament

- (Namibia) Virgil Vries

Fair Player award

- Madagascar
