= 2019 Africa Cup of Nations Group A =

Football tournament group stage

Group A of the 2019 Africa Cup of Nations took place from 21 to 30 June 2019. The group consisted of DR Congo, hosts Egypt, Uganda and Zimbabwe.

Egypt and Uganda as the top two teams, along with DR Congo as one of the four best third-placed teams, advanced to the round of 16.

== Teams ==
Draw position	Team	Zone	Method of qualification	Date of qualification	Finals appearance	Last appearance	Previous best performance	FIFA Rankings	
Draw position	Team	Zone	Method of qualification	Date of qualification	Finals appearance	Last appearance	Previous best performance	April 2019 (Note: The rankings of April 2019 were used for seeding for the final draw.)	June 2019
A1	Egypt	UNAF	Hosts and Group J runners-up	16 October 2018	24th	2017	Winners (1957, 1959, 1986, 1998, 2006, 2008, 2010)	57	58
A2	DR Congo	UNIFFAC	Group G runners-up	24 March 2019	19th	2017	Winners (1968, 1974)	46	49
A3	Uganda	CECAFA	Group L winners	17 November 2018	7th	2017	Runners-up (1978)	79	80
A4	Zimbabwe	COSAFA	Group G winners	24 March 2019	4th	2017	Group stage (2004, 2006, 2017)	110	109

== Standings ==
Pos	Team	Pld	W	D	L	GF	GA	GD	Pts	Qualification
1	Egypt (H)	3	3	0	0	5	0	+5	9	Advance to knockout stage
2	Uganda	3	1	1	1	3	3	0	4	Advance to knockout stage
3	DR Congo	3	1	0	2	4	4	0	3	Advance to knockout stage
4	Zimbabwe	3	0	1	2	1	6	−5	1	

Source: CAF
Rules for classification: Tiebreakers
(H) Hosts

In the round of 16:

- The winners of Group A, Egypt, advanced to play the third-placed team of Group D, South Africa.
- The runners-up of Group A, Uganda, advanced to play the runners-up of Group C, Senegal.
- The third-placed team of Group A, DR Congo, advanced to play the winners of Group B, Madagascar.

== Matches ==
=== Egypt vs Zimbabwe ===
21 June 2019
22:00

Egypt	1–0	Zimbabwe
Trézéguet 41'	Report

Cairo International Stadium, Cairo
Attendance: 73,299
Referee: Sidi Alioum (Cameroon)

Egypt	Zimbabwe

GK	16	Mohamed El Shenawy
RB	3	Ahmed Elmohamady (c)
CB	12	Ayman Ashraf
CB	6	Ahmed Hegazi
LB	20	Mahmoud Alaa	(yellow card) 81'
CM	19	Abdallah El Said		(substituted off) 71'
CM	17	Mohamed Elneny
CM	8	Tarek Hamed
RW	7	Trézéguet		(substituted off) 81'
CF	10	Mohamed Salah
LW	9	Marwan Mohsen		(substituted off) 60'
Substitutions:
MF	11	Walid Soliman		(substituted in) 60'
MF	22	Amr Warda		(substituted in) 71'
MF	21	Nabil Emad		(substituted in) 81'
Manager:
(Mexico) Javier Aguirre

GK	1	Edmore Sibanda		(substituted off) 80'
RB	2	Tendayi Darikwa
CB	5	Divine Lunga
CB	15	Teenage Hadebe
LB	6	Alec Mudimu
CM	8	Marshall Munetsi
CM	10	Ovidy Karuru
CM	18	Marvelous Nakamba
RW	11	Khama Billiat
CF	17	Knowledge Musona (c)		(substituted off) 85'
LW	23	Nyasha Mushekwi		(substituted off) 81'
Substitutions:
GK	13	Elvis Chipezeze		(substituted in) 80'
FW	9	Evans Rusike		(substituted in) 81'
FW	7	Talent Chawapiwa	(yellow card) 88'	(substituted in) 85'
Manager:
Sunday Chidzambwa

Man of the Match:
Mahmoud Alaa (Egypt)

Assistant referees:
Evarist Menkouande (Cameroon)
El Hadji Samba (Senegal)
Fourth official:
Maguette N'Diaye (Senegal)

=== DR Congo vs Uganda ===
22 June 2019
16:30

DR Congo	0–2	Uganda
	Report	Kaddu 14'; Okwi 48'

Cairo International Stadium, Cairo
Attendance: 1,083
Referee: Rédouane Jiyed (Morocco)

DR Congo	Uganda

GK	1	Ley Matampi
RB	2	Issama Mpeko
CB	14	Arthur Masuaku
CB	5	Marcel Tisserand
LB	15	Christian Luyindama
CM	10	Paul-José M'Poku		(substituted off) 52'
CM	18	Merveille Bokadi	(yellow card) 54'
CM	22	Chancel Mbemba		(substituted off) 60'
RW	11	Yannick Bolasie	(yellow card) 45+2'	(substituted off) 71'
CF	13	Meschak Elia
LW	17	Cédric Bakambu
Substitutions:
FW	9	Jonathan Bolingi		(substituted in) 52'
MF	20	Jacques Maghoma		(substituted in) 60'
FW	19	Britt Assombalonga		(substituted in) 71'
Manager:
Florent Ibengé

GK	18	Denis Onyango
RB	5	Bevis Mugabi
CB	15	Godfrey Walusimbi
CB	16	Hassan Wasswa
LB	4	Murushid Juuko	(yellow card) 35'
DM	23	Michael Azira
RW	8	Khalid Aucho
AM	22	Lumala Abdu		(substituted off) 81'
LW	17	Farouk Miya		(substituted off) 88'
CF	9	Patrick Kaddu		(substituted off) 75'
CF	7	Emmanuel Okwi
Substitutions:
FW	21	Allan Kyambadde		(substituted in) 75'
DF	20	Isaac Muleme		(substituted in) 81'
DF	3	Timothy Awany		(substituted in) 88'
Manager:
(France) Sébastien Desabre

Man of the Match:
Emmanuel Okwi (Uganda)

Assistant referees:
Azgaou Lahcen (Morocco)
Mustapha Akarkad (Morocco)
Fourth official:
Noureddine El Jaafari (Morocco)

=== Uganda vs Zimbabwe ===
26 June 2019
19:00

Uganda	1–1	Zimbabwe
Okwi 12'	Report	Billiat 40'

Cairo International Stadium, Cairo
Attendance: 73,589
Referee: Eric Otogo-Castane (Gabon)

Uganda	Zimbabwe

GK	18	Denis Onyango (c)
RB	5	Bevis Mugabi
CB	15	Godfrey Walusimbi
CB	12	Ronald Mukiibi
LB	16	Hassan Wasswa
CM	23	Michael Azira		(substituted off) 62'
RW	17	Farouk Miya		(substituted off) 89'
AM	7	Emmanuel Okwi		(substituted off) 73'
LW	8	Khalid Aucho	(yellow card) 88'
CF	9	Patrick Kaddu
CF	22	Lumala Abdu
Substitutions:
MF	6	Taddeo Lwanga		(substituted in) 62'
FW	21	Allan Kyambadde		(substituted in) 73'
DF	3	Timothy Awany		(substituted in) 89'
Manager:
(France) Sébastien Desabre

GK	16	George Chigova
RB	2	Tendayi Darikwa
CB	5	Divine Lunga
CB	15	Teenage Hadebe
LB	6	Alec Mudimu
CM	3	Danny Phiri
RW	21	Thabani Kamusoko	(substituted off) 66'
AM	7	Talent Chawapiwa	(substituted off) 64'
LW	10	Ovidy Karuru
CF	17	Knowledge Musona (c)
CF	11	Khama Billiat
Substitutions:
FW	9	Evans Rusike	(substituted in) 64'
MF	8	Marshall Munetsi	(substituted in) 66'
Manager:
Sunday Chidzambwa

Man of the Match:
Khama Billiat (Zimbabwe)

Assistant referees:
Issa Yaya (Chad)
Lionel Andrianantenaiana (Madagascar)
Fourth official:
Mahamadou Keita (Mali)

=== Egypt vs DR Congo ===
26 June 2019
22:00

Egypt	2–0	DR Congo
A. Elmohamady 25'; Salah 43'	Report

Cairo International Stadium, Cairo
Attendance: 74,219
Referee: Victor Gomes (South Africa)

Egypt	DR Congo

GK	16	Mohamed El Shenawy
RB	3	Ahmed Elmohamady (c)
CB	6	Ahmed Hegazi
CB	20	Mahmoud Alaa	(yellow card) 81'
LB	12	Ayman Ashraf
CM	17	Mohamed Elneny	(yellow card) 68'
CM	8	Tarek Hamed
RW	10	Mohamed Salah
AM	19	Abdallah El Said		(substituted off) 68'
LW	7	Trézéguet		(substituted off) 84'
CF	9	Marwan Mohsen		(substituted off) 59'
Substitutions:
FW	18	Ahmed Hassan		(substituted in) 59'
MF	11	Walid Soliman		(substituted in) 68'
MF	5	Ali Ghazal	(yellow card) 87'	(substituted in) 84'
Manager:
(Mexico) Javier Aguirre

GK	1	Ley Matampi
RB	2	Issama Mpeko
CB	15	Christian Luyindama
CB	5	Marcel Tisserand (c)
LB	3	Ngonda Muzinga	(yellow card) 59'
CM	18	Merveille Bokadi	(yellow card) 30'	(substituted off) 64'
CM	8	Trésor Mputu		(substituted off) 46'
CM	12	Wilfred Moke
RW	20	Jacques Maghoma
CF	17	Cédric Bakambu
LW	9	Jonathan Bolingi
Substitutions:
FW	13	Meschak Elia		(substituted in) 46'
FW	11	Yannick Bolasie		(substituted in) 64'
Manager:
Florent Ibengé

Man of the Match:
Trézéguet (Egypt)

Assistant referees:
Zakhele Siwela (South Africa)
Souru Phatsoane (Lesotho)
Fourth official:
Joshua Bondo (Botswana)

=== Uganda vs Egypt ===
30 June 2019
21:00

Uganda	0–2	Egypt
	Report	Salah 36'; A. Elmohamady 45+1'

Cairo International Stadium, Cairo
Attendance: 74,566
Referee: Maguette Ndiaye (Senegal)

Uganda	Egypt

GK	18	Denis Onyango (c)		(substituted off) 72'
RB	14	Wakiro Wadada
CB	3	Timothy Awany
CB	16	Mawanda Wasswa
LB	15	Godfrey Walusimbi
CM	17	Farouk Miya
CM	23	Micheal Azira
CM	8	Khalid Aucho		(substituted off) 70'
RW	22	Lumala Abdu
CF	7	Emmanuel Okwi
LW	21	Allan Kyambadde	(yellow card) 59'	(substituted off) 79'
Substitutions:
MF	6	Taddeo Lwanga	(yellow card) 88'	(substituted in) 70'
GK	1	Robert Odongkara		(substituted in) 72'
MF	10	Luwagga Kizito		(substituted in) 79'
Manager:
(France) Sébastien Desabre

GK	16	Mohamed El Shenawy
RB	3	Ahmed Elmohamady (c)	(substituted off) 90+1'
CB	6	Ahmed Hegazi
CB	2	Baher El Mohamady
LB	12	Ayman Ashraf
CM	21	Nabil Emad
CM	17	Mohamed Elneny	(substituted off) 62'
RW	10	Mohamed Salah
AM	19	Abdallah El Said
LW	7	Trézéguet
CF	18	Ahmed Hassan Kouka	(substituted off) 24'
Substitutions:
FW	9	Marwan Mohsen	(substituted in) 24'
MF	8	Tarek Hamed	(substituted in) 62'
DF	4	Omar Gaber	(substituted in) 90+1'
Manager:
(Mexico) Javier Aguirre

Man of the Match:
Ahmed Elmohamady (Egypt)

Assistant referees:
Nguegoue Elvis Guy Noupue (Cameroon)
Seydou Tiama (Burkina Faso)
Fourth official:
Helder Martins de Carvalho (Angola)

=== Zimbabwe vs DR Congo ===
30 June 2019
21:00

Zimbabwe	0–4	DR Congo
	Report	Bolingi 4'; Bakambu 34', 65' (pen.); Assombalonga 78'

30 June Stadium, Cairo
Attendance: 4,364
Referee: Mustapha Ghorbal (Algeria)

Zimbabwe	DR Congo

GK	13	Elvis Chipezeze	(yellow card) 64'
RB	2	Tendayi Darikwa
CB	22	Lawrence Mhlanga
CB	15	Teenage Hadebe
LB	4	Ronald Pfumbidzai
CM	8	Nyasha Munetsi		(substituted off) 70'
CM	3	Danny Phiri
CM	10	Ovidy Karuru
RW	7	Talent Chawapiwa		(substituted off) 52'
CF	17	Knowledge Musona (c)		(substituted off) 80'
LW	11	Khama Billiat
Substitutions:
FW	23	Nyasha Mushekwi		(substituted in) 52'
FW	14	Tino Kadewere		(substituted in) 70'
MF	20	Kudakwashe Mahachi		(substituted in) 80'
Manager:
Sunday Chidzambwa

GK	1	Ley Matampi
RB	2	Issama Mpeko	(yellow card) 70'
CB	22	Chancel Mbemba	(yellow card) 59'
CB	5	Marcel Tisserand
LB	3	Ngonda Muzinga
RM	6	Chadrac Akolo		(substituted off) 83'
CM	7	Youssouf Mulumbu (c)		(substituted off) 76'
CM	12	Wilfred Moke	(yellow card) 61'
LM	20	Jacques Maghoma
CF	9	Jonathan Bolingi		(substituted off) 45+1'
CF	17	Cédric Bakambu
Substitutions:
FW	19	Britt Assombalonga		(substituted in) 45+1'
FW	13	Meschak Elia		(substituted in) 76'
DF	15	Christian Luyindama		(substituted in) 83'
Manager:
Florent Ibengé

Man of the Match:
Cédric Bakambu (DR Congo)

Assistant referees:
Abdelhak Etchiali (Algeria)
Mokrane Gourari (Algeria)
Fourth official:
Ahmad Imetehaz Heeralall (Mauritius)
