= 2017 COSAFA Cup =

Tournament details
- Host country: South Africa
- Dates: 25 June–9 July 2017
- Teams: 14 (from 1 sub-confederation)
- Venues: 2 (in 2 host cities)

Final positions
- Champions: Zimbabwe (5th title)
- Runners-up: Zambia
- Third place: Tanzania
- Fourth place: Lesotho

Tournament statistics
- Matches played: 23
- Goals scored: 53 (2.3 per match)
- Top scorer: (Zimbabwe) Ovidy Karuru (6 goals)

The 2017 COSAFA Cup (known as Castle Lager COSAFA Cup South Africa 2017 for sponsorship reasons) is the 17th edition of the COSAFA Cup, an international football competition consisting of national teams of member nations of the Council of Southern Africa Football Associations (COSAFA). It was held in South Africa from 25 June to 9 July.

== Format ==
Globe with the COSAFA nations shaded. Tanzania also competed as an invitee.

14 teams compete.

8 teams compete in the group stage:

- Angola
- Madagascar
- Malawi
- Mauritius
- Mozambique
- Seychelles
- Tanzania (invitee)
- Zimbabwe

The teams are drawn into 2 groups of 4 teams. Each team plays each other team in its group once, earning 3 points for a win and 1 for a draw. The two group winners advance to the quarter-finals.

6 teams receive a bye to the quarter-finals:

- Botswana
- Lesotho
- Namibia
- South Africa
- Swaziland
- Zambia

The remainder of the tournament is straight knockout, with quarter-finals, semi-finals, a third place playoff and a final to decide the winners of the COSAFA Cup.

The four losing quarter-finalists compete for the Plate.

== Venues ==
Moruleng	2017 COSAFA Cup is located in South Africa	Phokeng
Moruleng Stadium	2017 COSAFA Cup is located in South Africa	Royal Bafokeng Sports Palace
25.1566°S 27.1755°E	2017 COSAFA Cup is located in South Africa	25.5786°S 27.1607°E
Capacity: 20,000	2017 COSAFA Cup is located in South Africa	Capacity: 44,300

== Draw ==
The draw was announced on 18 May 2017.

== Group stage ==
=== Group A ===
Pos	Team	Pld	W	D	L	GF	GA	GD	Pts	Qualification
1	Tanzania	3	1	2	0	3	1	+2	5	Qualification to Quarter-finals
2	Angola	3	1	2	0	1	0	+1	5	
3	Mauritius	3	0	2	1	1	2	−1	2	
4	Malawi	3	0	2	1	0	2	−2	2	

Updated to match(es) played on 30 June 2017. Source: COSAFA
25 June 2017
15:00

Tanzania	2–0	Malawi
Kichuya 13', 18'	Report

Moruleng Stadium, Moruleng
Referee: Hélder Martins De Carvalho (Angola)
25 June 2017
17:30

Mauritius	0–1	Angola
	Report	Quibeto 4'

Moruleng Stadium, Moruleng
Referee: Jackson Pavaza (Namibia)

27 June 2017
17:00

Malawi	0–0	Mauritius
	Report

Royal Bafokeng Stadium, Phokeng
Referee: Lebalang Mokete (Lesotho)
27 June 2017
19:30

Angola	0–0	Tanzania
	Report

Royal Bafokeng Stadium, Phokeng
Referee: Victor Gomes (South Africa)

29 June 2017
17:00

Tanzania	1–1	Mauritius
Msuva 68'	Report	Perticots 67'

Moruleng Stadium, Moruleng
Referee: Hélder Martins De Carvalho (Angola)
29 June 2017
17:00

Malawi	0–0	Angola
	Report

Royal Bafokeng Stadium, Phokeng
Referee: Ahmad Imtehaz Heeralall (Mauritius)

=== Group B ===
Pos	Team	Pld	W	D	L	GF	GA	GD	Pts	Qualification
1	Zimbabwe	3	2	1	0	10	0	+10	7	Qualification to Quarter-finals
2	Madagascar	3	2	1	0	6	1	+5	7	
3	Mozambique	3	1	0	2	3	9	−6	3	
4	Seychelles	3	0	0	3	1	10	−9	0	

Updated to match(es) played on 30 June 2017. Source: COSAFA
26 June 2017
17:00

Mozambique	0–4	Zimbabwe
	Report	Karuru 45+2', 66'; Mushure 78'; Majarira 90+3'

Moruleng Stadium, Moruleng
Referee: Ahmad Imtehaz Heeralall (Mauritius)
26 June 2017
19:30

Madagascar	2–0	Seychelles
Raveloarisona 45+1'; Raherinaivo 75'	Report

Moruleng Stadium, Moruleng
Referee: Wisdom Chewe (Zambia)

28 June 2017
17:00

Zimbabwe	0–0	Madagascar
	Report

Royal Bafokeng Stadium, Phokeng
Referee: Joshua Bondo (Botswana)
28 June 2017
19:30

Seychelles	1–2	Mozambique
Melanie 63'	Report	Teca 48'; Simango 70'

Royal Bafokeng Stadium, Phokeng
Referee: Pilan Ncube (Zimbabwe)

30 June 2017
17:00

Mozambique	1–4	Madagascar
Arnaldo 30'	Report	Fanomezana 8', 54'; Ndrantoharilala 33'; Raherinaivo 79'

Moruleng Stadium, Moruleng
Referee: Victor Gomes (South Africa)
30 June 2017
17:00

Zimbabwe	6–0	Seychelles
Karuru 24', 26', 67'; Dube 57'; Mushure 85', 90+3'	Report

Royal Bafokeng Stadium, Phokeng
Referee: Jackson Pavaza (Namibia)

== Knockout stage ==
Quarter-finals
1 July
Botswana	1
Zambia	2
2 July
South Africa	0
Tanzania	1
1 July
Namibia	0 (4)
Lesotho	0 (5)
2 July
Swaziland	1
Zimbabwe	2

Semi-finals
5 July
Zambia	4
Tanzania	2
5 July
Lesotho	3
Zimbabwe	4

Final
9 July
Zambia	1
Zimbabwe	3
Third place
7 July
Tanzania	0 (4)
Lesotho	0 (2)

=== Quarter-finals ===
1 July 2017
15:00

Botswana	1–2	Zambia
Seakanyeng 79'	Report	Mwila 10'; Shonga 70'

Royal Bafokeng Stadium, Phokeng
Referee: Ahmad Imtehaz Heeralall (Mauritius)
1 July 2017
17:30

Namibia	0–0 (a.e.t.)	Lesotho
	Report
Penalties
Shitembi (penalty scored); Keimuine (penalty scored); Katjiteo (penalty missed); Ketjijere (penalty scored); Katjiteo (penalty scored); Gebhardt (penalty missed)	4–5	Kalake (penalty scored); Koetle (penalty missed); Motebang (penalty scored); Sello (penalty scored); Mokhehle (penalty scored); Moremoholo (penalty scored)

Royal Bafokeng Stadium, Phokeng
Referee: Wisdom Chewe (Zambia)

2 July 2017
17:00

South Africa	0–1	Tanzania
	Report	Maguri 18'

Royal Bafokeng Stadium, Phokeng
Referee: Pilan Ncube (Zimbabwe)
2 July 2017
19:30

Swaziland	1–2	Zimbabwe
Badenhorst 48'	Report	Karuru 16'; Mutizwa 79'

Royal Bafokeng Stadium, Phokeng
Referee: Victor Gomes (South Africa)

=== Semi-finals ===
5 July 2017
17:00

Zambia	4–2	Tanzania
Mwila 44'; Shonga 45+2', 68'; Chirwa 56' (pen.)	Report	Nyoni 16'; Msuva 85'

Moruleng Stadium, Moruleng
Referee: Victor Gomes (South Africa)
5 July 2017
19:30

Lesotho	3–4	Zimbabwe
Motebang 42'; Potloane 80'; Koetle 90+2' (pen.)	Report	Mutizwa 19', 51', 83'; Chawapiwa 64'

Moruleng Stadium, Moruleng
Referee: Hélder Martins De Carvalho (Angola)

=== Third-place playoff ===
7 July 2017
19:30

Tanzania	0–0 (a.e.t.)	Lesotho
	Report
Penalties
Ramadhani (penalty missed); Mao (penalty scored); Msuva (penalty scored); Banda (penalty scored); Loth (penalty scored)	4–2	Kalake (penalty scored); Koetle (penalty scored); Motebang (penalty missed); Mokhehle (penalty missed)

Moruleng Stadium, Moruleng
Referee: Wisdom Chewe (Zambia)

=== Final ===
9 July 2017
15:00

Zambia	1–3	Zimbabwe
Mundia 39'	Report	Mutizwa 2'; Chawapiwa 57'; Mushure 67'

Royal Bafokeng Stadium, Phokeng
Referee: Ahmad Imtehaz Heeralall (Mauritius)

== Plate ==
The losing quarter-finalists will qualify for this round.

Semi-finals
4 July
Botswana	0
South Africa	2
4 July
Namibia	1
Swaziland	0

Final
7 July
South Africa	1
Namibia	0

=== Semi-finals ===
4 July 2017
17:00

Botswana	0–2	South Africa
	Report	Norodien 33'; Moseamedi 90+3'

Moruleng Stadium, Moruleng
Referee: Andofetra Rakotojaona (Madagascar)
4 July 2017
19:30

Namibia	1–0	Swaziland
Ketjijere 57'	Report

Moruleng Stadium, Moruleng
Referee: Lebalang Mokete (Lesotho)

=== Final ===
7 July 2017
17:00

South Africa	1–0	Namibia
Mokate 36'	Report

Moruleng Stadium, Moruleng
Referee: Pilan Ncube (Zimbabwe)

== Goalscorers ==
There have been 53 goals scored in 23 matches, for an average of 2.3 goals per match.

6 goals

- (Zimbabwe) Ovidy Karuru

5 goals

- (Zimbabwe) Knox Mutizwa

4 goals

- (Zimbabwe) Ocean Mushure

3 goals

- (Zambia) Justin Shonga

2 goals

- (Madagascar) Tojo Claudel Fanomezana
- (Madagascar) Rinjala Raherinaivo
- (Tanzania) Shiza Kichuya
- (Tanzania) Simon Msuva
- (Zambia) Brian Mwila
- (Zimbabwe) Talent Chawapiwa

1 goal

- (Angola) Augusto Quibeto
- (Botswana) Kabelo Seakanyeng
- (Lesotho) Tsoanelo Koetle
- (Lesotho) Sera Motebang
- (Lesotho) Mabuti Potloane
- (Madagascar) Ranaivoson Ndrantoharilala
- (Madagascar) Ardino Raveloarisona
- (Mauritius) Kevin Perticots
- (Mozambique) Arnaldo
- (Mozambique) Joao Simango
- (Mozambique) Stélio Teca
- (Namibia) Ronald Ketjijere
- (Seychelles) Roddy Melanie
- (South Africa) Mohau Mokate
- (South Africa) Judas Moseamedi
- (South Africa) Riyaad Norodien
- (Eswatini) Felix Badenhorst
- (Tanzania) Elias Maguri
- (Tanzania) Erasto Nyoni
- (Zambia) Jackson Chirwa
- (Zambia) Lubinda Mundia
- (Zimbabwe) Prince Dube
- (Zimbabwe) Blessing Majarira

== Awards ==
Player of the Tournament

- Knox Mutizwa (ZIM)

Golden Boot

- Ovidy Karuru (ZIM) (6 goals)

Best Goalkeeper

- Said Mohamed Said (TAN)
