= Brian Mwila =

Zambian footballer (born 1994)

Personal information
- Date of birth: 16 June 1994 (age 32)
- Place of birth: Samfya, Luapula Province, Zambia
- Height: 1.82 m (6 ft 0 in)
- Position: Forward

Team information
- Current team: Zanaco F.C.

Youth career
- Lime Hotspurs

Senior career*
Years	Team	Apps	(Gls)
2013–2014	Lime Hotspurs		
2014–2015	Kabwe Warriors		
2015–2017	Green Buffaloes		
2017	Platinum Stars	4	(0)
2018	Buildcon F.C.		
2018–2020	Rheindorf Altach	7	(2)
2020	Dudelange	0	(0)
2020–	Buildcon F.C.		

International career^{‡}
2017–	Zambia	20	(10)
- * Club domestic league appearances and goals as of 7 September 2021 ‡ National team caps and goals as of 17:00, 25 March 2018 (UTC)

Brian Mwila (born 16 June 1994) is a Zambian professional footballer who plays as a striker for Zanaco F.C. and the Zambian national team.

Mwila's playing career begun in his native Zambia where he turned out for Lime Hotspurs, Kabwe Warriors and Green Buffaloes before moving to South Africa to join Platinum Stars in 2017. He left the club shortly after to return to Zambia where he joined Buildcon and later that year joined Altach.

He made his senior international debut for Zambia earlier in 2017 and helped his nation to a runners-up finish in the COSAFA Cup later that year.

== Club career ==
=== Early career ===
Mwila's professional career started in 2013 when he was signed from a provincial academy side by Lime Hotspurs. He enjoyed a successful debut season with the club which earned him a transfer to Kabwe Warriors, before moving again to join Green Buffaloes in 2015.

=== Platinum Stars ===
Following an impressive showing with Zambia at the 2017 COSAFA Cup in South Africa, Mwila was courted by PSL sides Baroka and Platinum Stars. An agreement was reached with Baroka in July 2017 but the player later elected to join Platinum Stars on a three-year contract after the club offered him an improved deal.

Having missed the opening months of the season through an injury sustained on international duty, he made his debut for the club on 19 October, coming on as a second-half substitute in a 1–1 PSL draw with Orlando Pirates. In December 2017, having made only a handful of appearances for the club, Mwila returned to Zambia for the Christmas holidays but failed to return for the second half of the season.

=== Buildcon ===
Following his departure from Platinum Stars, Mwila signed for Buildcon in February 2018. There he spent four months at the club but scored only twice before leaving at the end of the season. In June 2018, Mwila was again involved in a transfer controversy when he was reported to have signed for Egyptian Premier League club Smouha on a three-year contract. It was later revealed that he had never signed a contract with the Egyptian side and he temporarily remained a Buildcon player.

=== SCR Altach ===
The following month, Mwila signed for Austrian side SCR Altach on a three-year deal. He scored his first goals for the club on 7 October 2018, netting twice in a 2–0 league win over Austria Wien.

== International career ==
=== Zambia national football team ===
Mwila made his debut for Zambia against Gabon on 4 June 2017 and scored his first goal in a friendly match against South Africa nine days later. The following month, he featured at the 2017 COSAFA Cup hosted in South Africa where he scored two goals before Zambia fell to Zimbabwe in the final. He continued his form in 2017 with two goals in two matches against Swaziland before netting a brace in World Cup qualifying against Algeria in September.

== Career statistics ==
=== International ===
As of 7 September 2021

National team	Year	Apps	Goals
Zambia	2017	9	8
Zambia	2018	2	0
Zambia	2019	0	0
Zambia	2020	0	0
Zambia	2021	9	2
Total		20	10

=== International goals ===
As of match played 11 November 2017. Zambia score listed first, score column indicates score after each Mwila goal.

International goals by date, venue, cap, opponent, score, result and competition
No.	Date	Venue	Cap	Opponent	Score	Result	Competition
1	13 June 2017	Moruleng Stadium, Moruleng, South Africa	2	South Africa	1–1	2–1	Friendly
2	1 July 2017	Royal Bafokeng Stadium, Rustenburg, South Africa	3	Botswana	1–0	2–1	2017 COSAFA Cup
3	5 July 2017	Moruleng Stadium, Moruleng, South Africa	4	Tanzania	1–1	4–2	2017 COSAFA Cup
4	16 July 2017	Somhlolo National Stadium, Lobamba, Swaziland	6	Swaziland	2–0	4–0	2018 African Nations Championship qualification
5	22 July 2017	National Heroes Stadium, Lusaka, Zambia	7	Swaziland	2–0	3–0	2018 African Nations Championship qualification
6	2 September 2017	National Heroes Stadium, Lusaka, Zambia	8	Algeria	1–0	3–1	2018 FIFA World Cup qualification
7	2 September 2017	National Heroes Stadium, Lusaka, Zambia	8	Algeria	2–0	3–1	2018 FIFA World Cup qualification
8	11 November 2017	Levy Mwanawasa Stadium, Ndola, Zambia	9	Cameroon	2–1	2–2	2018 FIFA World Cup qualification
9	11 June 2021	Al-Hilal Stadium, Omdurman, Sudan	15	Sudan	1–2	2–3	Friendly
10	11 June 2021	Al-Hilal Stadium, Omdurman, Sudan	15	Sudan	2–3	2–3	Friendly
