= Ocean Mushure =

Zimbabwean footballer (born 1985)

Personal information
- Full name: Ocean Mushure
- Date of birth: 1 July 1985 (age 41)
- Place of birth: Harare, Zimbabwe
- Position: Defender

Team information
- Current team: Kabwe warriors

Senior career*
Years	Team	Apps	(Gls)
2009–2011	Monomotapa United		
2011	→ Motor Action (loan)		
2011–2018	Dynamos		
2018–	Lusaka Dynamos		

International career^{‡}
2013–	Zimbabwe	19	(4)
- * Club domestic league appearances and goals ‡ National team caps and goals as of 14:29, 9 January 2019 (UTC)

Ocean Mushure (born 1 July 1985) is a Zimbabwean footballer who plays as a defender for Lusaka Dynamos and the Zimbabwe national team.

== Career ==
=== Club ===
Mushure's first club was Monomotapa United, he spent two years in and around the first team before being loaned out in 2011 to Motor Action. Immediately after returning from Motor Action, Mushure was signed by Dynamos. Since joining Dynamos he has won six trophies in five seasons. He signed a new contract with Dynamos on 17 January 2017. In December 2018, Mushure joined Lusaka Dynamos of the Zambian Super League on a two-year contract.

=== International ===
Internationally, Mushure has won five caps for the Zimbabwe national team. His debut came in a 2014 FIFA World Cup qualifier versus Egypt. He made two further appearances in 2013 for Zimbabwe before waiting two years until appearing again, with his next call-up coming for a friendly against Lesotho. A year later, Mushure was selected by Zimbabwe for the 2016 African Nations Championship.

== Career statistics ==
=== International ===
As of 9 January 2019.

National team	Year	Apps	Goals
Zimbabwe	2013	9	0
Zimbabwe	2015	2	0
Zimbabwe	2016	2	0
Zimbabwe	2017	6	4
Total		19	4

=== International goals ===
Scores and results list Zimbabwe's goal tally first.

No	Date	Venue	Opponent	Score	Result	Competition
1.	26 June 2017	Moruleng Stadium, Moruleng, South Africa	Mozambique	3–0	4–0	2017 COSAFA Cup
2.	30 June 2017	Moruleng Stadium, Moruleng, South Africa	Seychelles	5–0	6–0	2017 COSAFA Cup
3.	30 June 2017	Moruleng Stadium, Moruleng, South Africa	Seychelles	6–0	6–0	2017 COSAFA Cup
4.	9 July 2017	Royal Bafokeng Stadium, Phokeng, South Africa	Zimbabwe	3–1	3–1	2017 COSAFA Cup

== Honours ==
Dynamos

- Zimbabwe Premier Soccer League: 2011, 2012, 2013 2014
- Mbada Diamonds Cup: 2011, 2012
