= Riyaad Norodien =

South African soccer player

Personal information
- Full name: Riyaad Norodien
- Date of birth: 26 March 1995 (age 31)
- Place of birth: Cape Town, South Africa
- Height: 1.68 m (5 ft 6 in)
- Position: Attacking midfielder

Team information
- Current team: Cape Town Spurs
- Number: 31

Youth career
- –2015: Ajax Cape Town

Senior career*
Years	Team	Apps	(Gls)
2015–2016	Ajax Cape Town	28	(3)
2016–2018	Orlando Pirates	15	(1)
2018	→ Platinum Stars (loan)	10	(3)
2018–2020	Cape Town City	29	(4)
2020	Cape Umoya United	8	(1)
2020–2021	Cape Town Spurs	4	(1)
2021–2023	DCMP		
2023-	Cape Town Spurs		

International career
2015	South Africa U23	3	(0)
2017–	South Africa	2	(1)
- * Club domestic league appearances and goals as of 5 July 2017

Riyaad Norodien (born 26 March 1995) is a South African professional soccer player who plays as a midfielder for Kiyovu based club Kiyovu.

== Early career ==
Born in Kensington, Cape Town, Norodien signed with local club Ajax Cape Town as a youngster. He was named Academy Player of the Year in 2012. In May 2015, he travelled with the Ajax Cape Town U19 team to Germany to compete in the Ergenzingen Tournament, where they were eliminated by Mexican side Guadalajara in the semi-finals. Norodien, however, was named Player of the Tournament, and caught the attention of various European clubs (including AFC Ajax).

== Professional career ==
=== Club career ===
On 4 April 2015, after a lengthy contract dispute, Norodien finally made his first professional appearance when he featured during a 2–1 loss to Platinum Stars. One month later, he scored his first professional goal, a close-range header, against Moroka Swallows. He followed it up by scoring against Orlando Pirates in the next game on 9 May (also the last game of the season). He received a pass from a goal-kick, juked two defenders and blasted the ball past Brighton Mhlongo for his second career goal. With his help, Ajax CP reached the finals of the 2014–15 Nedbank Cup. After only a month in the league, he had "taken the domestic game by storm," impressing teams both in South Africa and abroad.

=== International career ===
Norodien was selected to represent South Africa at the 2015 Africa U-23 Cup of Nations in Senegal, where the top three teams qualify for the 2016 Summer Olympics. He played in three games (against Senegal, Zambia and Algeria). South Africa finished in third place overall, qualifying for the Olympic tourney in Rio de Janeiro.

=== International goals ===
Scores and results list South Africa's goal tally first.

No	Date	Venue	Opponent	Score	Result	Competition
1.	4 July 2017	Moruleng Stadium, Moruleng, South Africa	Botswana	1–0	2–0	2017 COSAFA Cup

== Honours ==
=== Club ===
Ajax Cape Town

- Nedbank Cup: Runner-up 2014–15
- MTN 8 Cup: 2015
