= Shiza Kichuya =

Tanzanian footballer

Personal information
- Full name: Yahya Shiza Ramadhani Kichuya
- Date of birth: 5 August 1996 (age 30)
- Position: Forward

Team information
- Current team: Namungo football club

Senior career*
Years	Team	Apps	(Gls)
2015	Mtibwa Sugar		
2016–	Simba Sports	75	(17)
2018–	→ [pharco (loan)	3	(0)

International career^{‡}
2016–	Tanzania	22	(4)
- * Club domestic league appearances and goals as of 26 February 2019 ‡ National team caps and goals as of 28 March 2018

Shiza Kichuya (born 5 August 1996) is a Tanzanian international football player. Kichuya was named in the Tanzania squad for the 2017 COSAFA Cup and scored two goals against Malawi.

== International career ==
=== International goals ===
Scores and results list Tanzania's goal tally first.

No	Date	Venue	Opponent	Score	Result	Competition
1.	25 June 2017	Moruleng Stadium, Moruleng, South Africa	Malawi	1–0	2–0	2017 COSAFA Cup
2.	25 June 2017	Moruleng Stadium, Moruleng, South Africa	Malawi	2–0	2–0	2017 COSAFA Cup
3.	22 March 2018	July 5, 1962 Stadium, Algiers, Algeria	Algeria	1–1	1–4	Friendly
4.	27 March 2018	National Stadium, Dar es Salaam, Tanzania	DR Congo	2–0	2–0	Friendly
