= Jackson Chirwa =

Zambian footballer (born 1995)

Personal information
- Date of birth: 11 June 1995 (age 31)
- Place of birth: Zambia
- Position: Defensive midfielder

Team information
- Current team: Green Buffaloes F.C.

Senior career*
Years	Team	Apps	(Gls)
2015–	Green Buffaloes F.C.		

International career^{‡}
2015–	Zambia	28	(1)
- * Club domestic league appearances and goals ‡ National team caps and goals as of 13 October 2019

Jackson Chirwa (born 11 June 1995) is a Zambian footballer who plays as a midfielder for Green Buffaloes F.C. and the Zambia national football team.

== Career ==
=== International ===
Chirwa made his senior international debut on 4 July 2015 in a 2–1 victory over Namibia during 2016 CHAN qualification.

==== International Goals ====
Scores and results list Zambia's goal tally first.

Goal	Date	Venue	Opponent	Score	Result	Competition
1.	5 July 2017	Moruleng Stadium, Saulspoort, South Africa	Tanzania	3–1	4–2	2017 COSAFA Cup
