= Tšoanelo Koetle =

Mosotho footballer (born 1992)

Personal information
- Date of birth: 22 November 1992 (age 33)
- Position: Right-back

Team information
- Current team: Lioli

Senior career*
Years	Team	Apps	(Gls)
2011–2012	Matlama		
2012–	Lioli		

International career^{‡}
2011–	Lesotho	51	(2)
- * Club domestic league appearances and goals as of 21:30, 27 February 2021 (UTC) ‡ National team caps and goals as of 21:30, 27 February 2021 (UTC)

Tšoanelo Koetle (born 22 November 1992) is a Mosotho international footballer who plays for Lioli as a right-back. He played at the 2014 FIFA World Cup qualification.

== Career statistics ==
As of 27 February 2021

Appearances and goals by national team and year
National team	Year	Apps	Goals
Lesotho	2011	1	0
Lesotho	2012	2	0
Lesotho	2013	5	1
Lesotho	2014	13	0
Lesotho	2015	11	0
Lesotho	2017	10	1
Lesotho	2019	9	0
Total		51	2

Scores and results list Lesotho's goal tally first.

List of international goals scored by Tšoanelo Koetle
No.	Date	Venue	Opponent	Score	Result	Competition
1	8 September 2013	Al-Hilal Stadium, Omdurman, Sudan	Sudan	3–1	3–1	2014 FIFA World Cup qualification
2	5 July 2017	Moruleng Stadium, Moruleng, South Africa	Zimbabwe	3–4	3–4	2017 COSAFA Cup
