= Erasto Nyoni =

Tanzanian footballer (born 1988)

Personal information
- Full name: Erasto Edward Nyoni
- Date of birth: 7 May 1988 (age 38)
- Place of birth: Dar es Salaam, Tanzania
- Height: 1.78 m (5 ft 10 in)
- Position: Defensive midfielder

Senior career*
Years	Team	Apps	(Gls)
- Rolling Stone
2006	A.F.C. Arusha		
2007–2008	Vital'O		
2008–2017	Azam FC		
2017–2023	Simba S.C.	28+	(0+)
2023–2025	Namungo	50	(5)

International career
2006–2021	Tanzania	108	(7)
- * Club domestic league appearances and goals

Erasto Edward Nyoni (born 7 May 1988) is a Tanzanian former footballer who played as a defensive midfielder.

Nyoni is the most-capped player of the Tanzania national team with 108 appearances.

== International career ==
Nyoni represented Tanzania at international level.

== Career statistics ==
=== International ===
Appearances and goals by national team and year
National team	Year	Apps	Goals
Tanzania	2006	3	0
Tanzania	2007	6	1
Tanzania	2008	0	0
Tanzania	2009	4	0
Tanzania	2010	6	0
Tanzania	2011	4	0
Tanzania	2012	11	2
Tanzania	2013	15	0
Tanzania	2014	10	0
Tanzania	2015	6	0
Tanzania	2016	4	0
Tanzania	2017	14	1
Tanzania	2018	4	0
Tanzania	2019	12	2
Tanzania	2020	2	0
Tanzania	2021	7	1
Total		108	7

Scores and results list Tanzania's goal tally first, score column indicates score after each Nyoni goal.

List of international goals scored by Erasto Nyoni
No.	Date	Venue	Opponent	Score	Result	Competition
1	16 June 2007	Stade du 4 Août, Ouagadougou, Burkina Faso	Burkina Faso	1–0	1–0	2008 Africa Cup of Nations qualification
2	10 June 2012	National Stadium, Dar es Salaam, Tanzania	Gambia	2–1	2–1	2014 FIFA World Cup qualification
3	15 August 2012	Molepolole Stadium, Molepolole, Botswana	Botswana	1–0	3–3	Friendly
4	5 July 2017	Moruleng Stadium, Moruleng, South Africa	Zambia	1–0	2–4	2017 COSAFA Cup
5	24 March 2019	National Stadium, Dar es Salaam, Tanzania	Uganda	2–0	3–0	2019 Africa Cup of Nations qualification
6	18 October 2019	Al-Merrikh Stadium, Omdurman, Sudan	Sudan	1–1	1–2	2020 African Nations Championship qualification
7	7 September 2021	National Stadium, Dar es Salaam, Tanzania	Madagascar	1–0	3–2	2022 FIFA World Cup qualification

== See also ==
- List of men's footballers with 100 or more international caps
