= Aaron Katebe =

Zambian footballer (born 1992)

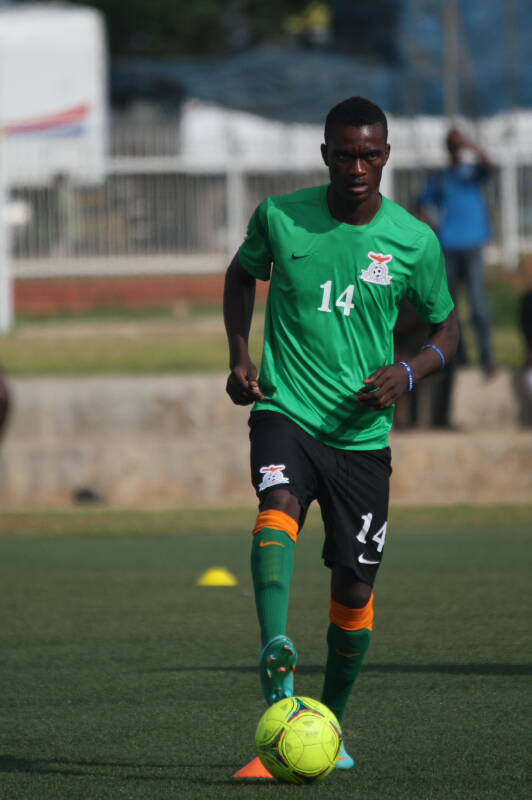
- Katebe training with Zambia at the 2013 African Cup of Nations

Personal information
- Date of birth: 24 January 1992 (age 34)
- Place of birth: Chililabombwe, Zambia
- Height: 1.90 m (6 ft 3 in)
- Positions: Center back; defensive midfielder; right back

Youth career
- Afrisports FC

Senior career*
Years	Team	Apps	(Gls)
2008–2010	Afrisports FC	16	
2010–2011	Konkola Blades	19	(5)
2011–2012	→ Hwange	20	(4)
2013–2014	→ FC Platinum	45	(3)
2014–2015	→ Moghreb Tétouan	19	(4)
2015–2016	→ Zanaco	20	(4)
2016–2017	→ Nkana	23	(4)
2017–2018	→ Nkana	17	(2)
2018–2020	Real Kashmir	18	(2)
2020–2021	Indeni	25	(2)
2022–	Power Dynamos	18	(1)

International career
2009	Zambia U-17	7	(2)
2010–2012	Zambia U-20	10	(3)
2012–2023	Zambia	14	(1)
- * Club domestic league appearances and goals

Aaron Katebe (born 24 January 1992) is a Zambian footballer who currently playing for Power Dynamos in the Zambia Super League as a defender.

== Club career ==
Born in Chililabombwe, near the Congolese border, Katebe began his career with Afrisports FC. As a youth player he was groomed by the Afrisports coaches who had previously had success with youth players such as Stoppila Sunzu and Rainford Kalaba. He soon found his way into Coach Honour Janza's 2010 COSAFA U-20 side. Zambia won the 2010 COSAFA U-20 Cup, and he soon caught the eye of scouts throughout Southern Africa.

In 2010, Katebe was transferred to Konkola Blades FC from Afrisports. After another good season, he saw himself become an international transfer, moving to Hwange of Zimbabwe. At Hwange, Katebe became a regular starter playing center-back and defensive midfield. During the league campaign he scored several decision making goals.

At the end of 2012, Katebe was coveted by teams in South Africa as well as teams in Zimbabwe and Zambia. A tussle broke out between Dynamos FC and Platinum FC (both of Zambia), but in the end Platinum were able to secure his signature.

In August 2013, he had trials with Danish 1st Division side Vendsyssel FF, and played with their 2nd team Hjørring IF. He returned to Platinum FC after the trial and has continued featuring for Platinum FC where he helped them to a 4th-place finish in the 2013 season. He continued the 2014 Season with FC Platinum.

In August 2015, Katebe signed for the Moroccan club Moghreb Tetouan after a fierce competition with WAC Casablanca, another Moroccan club. From 2018 to 2020, he played for Indian I-League club Real Kashmir under coaching of David Robertson.

== International career ==
Katebe was a member of the Zambian U-17 team that participated in a 4-Nation invitational U-17 Tournament in the UAE. The team placed 3rd, taking home a bronze medal. He then participated in the COSAFA U-20 Tournament the following year, winning the Championship.

Katebe earned his first full cap for Zambia in a goalless draw against Angola in a friendly match on 16 May 2012 in Luanda. Katebe played the entire 90 minutes in defence, playing first as a center back and then moving into the defensive midfield position. Katebe subsequently has featured for the Zambia national team in matches against Malawi, South Korea and Zimbabwe and Saudi Arabia.

He has been called up several times for the Zambia national team and has featured in friendly matches, the 2015 COSAFA Cup (where he scored 2 goals), and several African Nations Cup qualifiers.

=== International goals ===
Scores and results list Zambia's goal tally first.

No.	Date	Venue	Opponent	Score	Result	Competition
1.	27 May 2015	Moruleng Stadium, Moruleng, South Africa	Ghana	2–0	3–0	2015 COSAFA Cup

== Honors ==
- Bronze Medal, Abu Dhabi 4-Nation Invitational, UAE, 2009
- Champions, 2010 COSAFA U-20 Cup, Botswana

=== National team ===
Zambian U-17 Team

- 2009 Abu Dhabi 4-Nation Invitational, UAE

Zambia U-20 Team

- 2010 COSAFA U-20 Cup

Zambia National Team (Incomplete List)
- Angola vs. Zambia – 16 May 2012 – FRIENDLY
- Zambia vs. Malawi – 16 July 2012 – FRIENDLY
- Zambia vs. Zimbabwe – 8 August 2012 – FRIENDLY
- South Korea vs. Zambia – 15 August 2012 – FRIENDLY
- Saudi Arabia vs. Zambia – 5 December 2012 – FRIENDLY
- Lesotho vs. Zambia – 24 March 2013 – WORLD CUP QUALIFIER, UNUSED SUB

- Zambia vs. Ivory Coast – 25 October 2014 – FRIENDLY

- Mozambique vs. Zambia – 15 November 2014 – AFRICAN NATIONS CUP QUALIFIER, UNUSED SUB

- 2015 COSAFA Cup - 17–30 May 2015 - COSAFA CUP

- Zambia vs. Guinea-Bissau - 13 June 2015 – AFRICAN NATIONS CUP QUALIFIER
