= Ovidy Karuru =

Zimbabwean footballer (born 1989)

Personal information
- Full name: Ovidy Obvious Karuru
- Date of birth: 23 January 1989 (age 37)
- Place of birth: Masvingo, Zimbabwe
- Height: 1.81 m (5 ft 11 in)
- Position: Midfielder

Youth career
- 2001–2006: Masvingo United

Senior career*
Years	Team	Apps	(Gls)
2006–2008	Masvingo United	50	(15)
2009	Gunners	19	(8)
2009–2012	Boulogne	73	(10)
2012–2014	OH Leuven	32	(1)
2014–2016	Kaizer Chiefs	5	(0)
2017–2019	AmaZulu	59	(8)
2020	Stellenbosch	7	(1)
2020–2021	Black Leopards	23	(5)
2022	Al-Shoulla		

International career^{‡}
2007–2009	Zimbabwe U20	18	(4)
2007–	Zimbabwe	50	(7)
- * Club domestic league appearances and goals as of 20:30, 19 June 2020 (UTC) ‡ National team caps and goals as of 14:38, 13 July 2021 (UTC)

Ovidy Obvious Karuru (born January 23, 1989) is a Zimbabwean professional footballer who plays as a midfielder. He is currently playing for the Zimbabwe national team.

== Club career ==
Karuru began his career with Masvingo United F.C. and joined Newcastle United F.C. for a trial in March 2008. After two years in the senior side for Masvingo United he joined Gunners Football Club Harare in January 2009.

After only a half-year with Harare, he was sold to Ligue 1 team US Boulogne in the summer of 2009. With Boulogne he relegated twice in three seasons, ending up in the Championnat National in 2012, when he moved to OH Leuven in the Belgian Pro League. He made his league debut for the club on 15 September 2012 in a 1–0 home loss against Zulte Waregem replacing Evariste Ngolok in the 72nd minute. He scored his first league goal for the club on 20 October 2012 in a 4–1 home victory over Club Brugge. After being brought on in the 46th minute for Derick Ogbu, Karuru scored the fourth and final goal of the match for his side in the 81st minute. The assist came from Ebrahima Sawaneh. He joined Chiefs on 22 July 2014 as a free agent after opting not to renew his contract with OH Leuven, who were relegated from the Jupiler League at the end of the 2013–14 season.

Karuru joined Kaizer Chiefs and played in a pre-season friendly against Chippa United in which Chiefs won 4–2 in Port Elizabeth. Karuru received his work permit from the South African Department of Home Affairs on 22 August 2014 after a month-long delay. He was released by Kaizer Chiefs on 31 May 2016.

In February 2017, Karuru was picked up by South African club AmaZulu F.C. on a one-and-a-half-year deal. His league debut for the club came on 15 February 2017 in a 2–1 home loss to Mthatha Bucks F.C. He was subbed on for Zola Jingxi in the 61st minute. His first league goal for the club came on 19 April 2017 in a 3–1 away win over Royal Eagles F.C. His goal, scored in the 69th minute, made the score 2–1 in favour of AmaZulu.

On 29 January 2022, Karuru joined Saudi Arabian club Al-Shoulla.

== International career ==
Karuru is a former member of the Zimbabwe national under-20 football team and was with them as part of the 2009 African Nations Championship, he was also given captaincy of the team.

== Career statistics ==
=== Club ===
As of 17 July 2019.

Club statistics
Club	Season	League			Cup (Note: Includes the Nedbank Cup.)		League Cup (Note: Includes the Telkom Knockout.)		Continental		Other (Note: Includes the MTN 8.)		Total	
Club	Season	Division	Apps	Goals	Apps	Goals	Apps	Goals	Apps	Goals	Apps	Goals	Apps	Goals
AmaZulu	2016–17	National First Division	13	2	1	0	0	0	—		0	0	14	2
AmaZulu	2017–18	South African Premier Division	25	3	1	1	0	0	—		0	0	26	4
AmaZulu	2018–19	South African Premier Division	21	3	1	0	1	0	—		0	0	23	3
AmaZulu	Total		59	8	3	1	1	0	—		0	0	63	9
Career total			59	8	3	1	1	0	—		0	0	63	9

=== International ===
As of 30 June 2017.

National team	Year	Apps	Goals
Zimbabwe
Zimbabwe	2007	2	0
Zimbabwe	2008	5	0
Zimbabwe	2009	1	0
Zimbabwe	2010	1	0
Zimbabwe	2011	6	1
Zimbabwe	2012	2	0
Zimbabwe	2013	2	0
Zimbabwe	2014	1	0
Zimbabwe	2015	0	0
Zimbabwe	2016	0	0
Zimbabwe	2017	7	6
Zimbabwe	2018	5	0
Zimbabwe	2019	6	0
Total		38	7

=== International goals ===
Scores and results list Zimbabwe's goal tally first.

No	Date	Venue	Opponent	Score	Result	Competition
1.	4 September 2011	National Sports Stadium, Harare, Zimbabwe	Liberia	2–0	3–0	2012 Africa Cup of Nations qualification
2.	26 June 2017	Moruleng Stadium, Moruleng, South Africa	Mozambique	1–0	4–0	2017 COSAFA Cup
3.	26 June 2017	Moruleng Stadium, Moruleng, South Africa	Mozambique	2–0	4–0	2017 COSAFA Cup
4.	30 June 2017	Moruleng Stadium, Moruleng, South Africa	Seychelles	1–0	6–0	2017 COSAFA Cup
5.	30 June 2017	Moruleng Stadium, Moruleng, South Africa	Seychelles	2–0	6–0	2017 COSAFA Cup
6.	30 June 2017	Moruleng Stadium, Moruleng, South Africa	Seychelles	4–0	6–0	2017 COSAFA Cup
7.	2 July 2017	Royal Bafokeng Stadium, Phokeng, South Africa	Swaziland	1–0	2–1	2017 COSAFA Cup

== Honours ==
Masvingo United

- Zimbabwean Independence Trophy: 2006, 2007

Kaizer Chiefs

- South African Premier Division: 2014–15
- MTN 8: 2015
