= Knox Mutizwa =

Zimbabwean association football player (born 1993)

Personal information
- Date of birth: 12 October 1993 (age 33)
- Place of birth: Bulawayo, Zimbabwe
- Height: 1.70 m (5 ft 7 in)
- Position: Striker

Team information
- Current team: Richards Bay
- Number: 18

Senior career*
Years	Team	Apps	(Gls)
2011–2016	Highlanders		
2016–2025	Golden Arrows	207	(55)
2025–	Richards Bay	5	(1)

International career^{‡}
2014–2021	Zimbabwe	22	(6)
- * Club domestic league appearances and goals as of 4 January 2026 ‡ National team caps and goals as of 20 September 2023

Knox Mutizwa (born 12 October 1993) is a Zimbabwean footballer who plays as a striker for Richards Bay and the Zimbabwe national football team.

== International career ==
=== International goals ===
Scores and results list Zimbabwe's goal tally first.

No.	Date	Venue	Opponent	Score	Result	Competition
1.	2 July 2017	Royal Bafokeng Stadium, Phokeng, South Africa	Swaziland	2–1	2–1	2017 COSAFA Cup
2.	2 July 2017	Moruleng Stadium, Saulspoort, South Africa	Lesotho	1–0	4–3	2017 COSAFA Cup
3.	2 July 2017	Moruleng Stadium, Saulspoort, South Africa	Lesotho	2–1	4–3	2017 COSAFA Cup
4.	2 July 2017	Moruleng Stadium, Saulspoort, South Africa	Lesotho	4–2	4–3	2017 COSAFA Cup
5.	9 July 2017	Royal Bafokeng Stadium, Phokeng, South Africa	Zambia	1–0	3–1	2017 COSAFA Cup
6.	16 June 2019	El Sekka El Hadid Stadium, Cairo, Egypt	Tanzania	?–?	1–1	Friendly
