= 2018 Telkom Knockout =

Tournament details
- Country: South Africa
- Dates: 20 October – 8 December
- Teams: 16

Final positions
- Champions: Baroka
- Runners-up: Orlando Pirates

Tournament statistics
- Matches played: 15
- Goals scored: 32 (2.13 per match)
- Top goal scorer: Thembinkosi Lorch (4 goals)

The 2018 Telkom Knockout was the 37th edition of the Telkom Knockout, a South African cup competition comprising the 16 teams in the Premier Soccer League. It took place between October and December 2018, and was won by Baroka, their first-ever major title. The first-place prize money was R4 million.

== Results ==
=== First round ===
20 October 2018	Baroka	2–0	Golden Arrows	Peter Mokaba Stadium, Polokwane
15h30	Makgaka 1'; Sodi 80'	Report

20 October 2018	Free State Stars	0–1	Bidvest Wits	Goble Park, Bethlehem
15h30		Report	Murray 1'

20 October 2018	Mamelodi Sundowns	1–0	Bloemfontein Celtic	Lucas Moripe Stadium, Pretoria
18h00	Sirino 60'	Report

20 October 2018	Maritzburg United	2–1	Highlands Park	Harry Gwala Stadium, Pietermaritzburg
20h15	Ndlovu 76'; Mokate 88'	Report	Sekola 40'

20 October 2018	Orlando Pirates	1–0	Chippa United	Orlando Stadium, Soweto
20h15	Pule 60'	Report

21 October 2018	Polokwane City	1–1 (a.e.t.) (5–6 p)	Supersport United	Peter Mokaba Stadium, Polokwane
15h30	Pale 76'	Report	Manaka 91'

21 October 2018	Kaizer Chiefs	1–1 (a.e.t.) (4–2 p)	Black Leopards	FNB Stadium, Johannesburg
15h30	Ekstein 63'	Report	Nange 34'

21 October 2018	AmaZulu	2–0	Cape Town City	King Zwelithini Stadium, Durban
15h30	Tade 63'; Ntuli 66'	Report

=== Quarterfinals ===
3 November 2018	Baroka	2–0	Mamelodi Sundowns	Peter Mokaba Stadium, Polokwane
15h00	Mdantsane 22'; Pieterse 68' (o.g.)	Report

3 November 2018	AmaZulu	1–3	Orlando Pirates	Moses Mabhida Stadium, Durban
18h00	Ntuli 40'	Report	Lorch 37', 107'; Mlambo 92'

3 November 2018	Maritzburg United	1–2	Bidvest Wits	Harry Gwala Stadium, Pietermaritzburg
20h15	Figuareido 71'	Report	Domingo 40'; Mkhwanazi 45'

4 November 2018	Kaizer Chiefs	1–0	Supersport United	Moses Mabhida Stadium, Durban
15h00	Mphahlele 39'	Report

=== Semifinals ===
24 November 2018	Kaizer Chiefs	1–2	Orlando Pirates	Moses Mabhida Stadium, Durban
15h00	Castro 18'	Report	Lorch 13'; Shonga 84'

25 November 2018	Baroka	1–0	Bidvest Wits	Peter Mokaba Stadium, Polokwane
15h00	Mabeba 8'	Report

=== Final ===
8 December 2018	Baroka	2–2 (a.e.t.) (3-2 p)	Orlando Pirates	Nelson Mandela Bay Stadium, Port Elizabeth
18h00	Dickens 45'; Mdantsane 98'	Report	Nyatama 57'; Lorch 114'	Referee: Victor Gomes
	Penalties
	3		2
