= Limbikani =

Limbikani is a given name. Notable people with the name include:

- Limbikani Vanessa Chikupila (born 1996), Malawian footballer
- Limbikani Mzava (born 1993), Malawian footballer
