= Mabuti Potloane =

Mosotho footballer (born 1986)

Personal information
- Full name: Mabuti Potloane
- Date of birth: 15 January 1986 (age 40)
- Place of birth: Lesotho
- Position: Midfielder

Team information
- Current team: Linare
- Number: 10

Senior career*
Years	Team	Apps	(Gls)
2020–	Linare		

International career^{‡}
2013–2018	Lesotho	40	(2)
- * Club domestic league appearances and goals ‡ National team caps and goals as of 6 June 2017

Mabuti Potloane (born 15 January 1986) is a Mosotho professional footballer who plays as a midfielder.

== International career ==
=== International goals ===
Scores and results list Lesotho's goal tally first.

No	Date	Venue	Opponent	Score	Result	Competition
1.	1 June 2014	Setsoto Stadium, Maseru, Lesotho	Liberia	1–0	2–0	2015 Africa Cup of Nations qualification
2.	5 July 2017	Moruleng Stadium, Moruleng, South Africa	Zimbabwe	2–3	3–4	2017 COSAFA Cup
