= Rinjala Raherinaivo =

Malagasy footballer (born 1998)

Personal information
- Date of birth: 25 May 1998 (age 28)
- Place of birth: Antananarivo, Madagascar
- Height: 1.72 m (5 ft 8 in)
- Position: Midfielder

Team information
- Current team: Bulle
- Number: 11

Senior career*
Years	Team	Apps	(Gls)
2013–2015	AS Adema	55	(9)
2015–2016	CNaPS Sport	37	(4)
2016–2018	FC Sion II	24	(2)
2018–2020	CS Interstar II		
2020–2022	CNaPS Sport		
2023–2025	CS Chênois	61	(22)
2025–	Bulle	41	(12)

International career^{‡}
2016–2019	Madagascar	12	(2)
- * Club domestic league appearances and goals as of 1 October 2026 ‡ National team caps and goals as of 3:40, 12 August 2019 (UTC)

Rinjala Raherinaivo (born 25 May 1998) is a Malagasy footballer who plays as a midfielder for Swiss club Bulle and the Madagascar national team.

== International career ==
Raherinaivo made his debut for the Madagascar national team in a 6–1 defeat by DR Congo in a qualification game for the 2017 Africa Cup of Nations.

== Career statistics ==
=== Club ===
As of 15 July 2020

Appearances and goals by club, season and competition
Club	Season	League			Cup		Other		Total	
Club	Season	Division	Apps	Goals	Apps	Goals	Apps	Goals	Apps	Goals
FC Sion II	2016–17	1. Liga Promotion	21	2	0	0	0	0	21	2
FC Sion II	2017–18	Swiss Promotion League	3	0	0	0	0	0	3	0
Career total			24	2	0	0	0	0	24	2

=== International ===
As of match played 15 July 2020

Appearances and goals by national team and year
National team	Year	Apps	Goals
Madagascar	2016	4	0
Madagascar	2017	5	2
Madagascar	2018	1	0
Madagascar	2019	2	0
Madagascar	2020	0	0
Total		12	2

Scores and results list Madagascar's goal tally first, score column indicates score after each Raherinaivo goal.

List of international goals scored by Rinjala Raherinaivo
No.	Date	Venue	Opponent	Score	Result	Competition
1	26 June 2017	Moruleng Stadium, Moruleng, South Africa	Seychelles	2–0	2–0	2017 COSAFA Cup
2	30 June 2017	Moruleng Stadium, Moruleng, South Africa	Mozambique	4–1	4–1	2017 COSAFA Cup
3	31 July 2022	Mahamasina Municipal Stadium, Antananarivo	Seychelles	3–0	2–0	2022 African Nations Championship qualification
