= Nadolo =

Nadolo is a surname. Notable people with the surname include:

- Aisake Nadolo, a Fijian rugby union player
- King Nadolo, a Zimbabwean footballer
- Nemani Nadolo, a Fijian-Australian rugby union player
