= Mutizwa =

Mutizwa is a Zimbabwean surname. Notable people with the surname include:

- Forster Mutizwa, a Zimbabwean cricketer and cricket umpire
- Knox Mutizwa, a Zimbabwean footballer
