= Mulenga =

Mulenga is a name of Zambian origin that may refer to:

Given name:

- Kampamba Mulenga Chilumba (born 1976), Zambian politician
- Mulenga Kapwepwe (born 1958), Zambian author
- Mulenga Mulenga (born 1987), Zambian painter, writer, sculptor and photographer
- Alice Mulenga Lenshina (1920–1978), Zambian prisoner of conscience
- Mulenga Lubusha (1920–1978), Zambian Christian religious leader
- Mulenga Chilando (born 1988), Zambian Neurologist, Researcher

Surname:

- Anita Mulenga (born 1995), Zambian footballer who plays as a defender for the Zambia women's national team
- Augustine Mulenga (born 1990), Zambian football player
- Bejay Mulenga (born 1995), British entrepreneur
- Charity Basaza Mulenga (born 1979), Ugandan electrical engineer and academic administrator
- Chongo Mulenga (born 1998), Zambian male badminton player
- Clifford Mulenga (born 1987), Zambian footballer
- Emmanuel Mulenga (born 1979), Zambian politician
- Eston Mulenga (1967–1993), Zambian footballer
- Everisto Mulenga (born 1999), Zambian amateur boxer
- Ghost Mulenga (1954–1985), Zambian goalkeeper
- Jacob Mulenga (born 1984), Zambian former footballer
- Joseph Mulenga (died 2012), Ugandan judge
- Justin Mulenga (1955–2020), Zambian Roman Catholic bishop
- Kapambwe Mulenga (1963–1996), Zambian footballer
- Leonard Mulenga (born 1997), Zambian footballer
- Mukuka Mulenga (born 1993), Zambian footballer
- Mutale Mulenga (born 1967), Zambian athlete
- Nyambe Mulenga (born 1987), former Zambian footballer
- Timothy Mulenga, Zambian author and social justice activist
- Webster Mulenga (born 1993)), Zambian footballer
