= Elias Maguri =

Tanzanian footballer (born 1991)

Personal information
- Full name: Elias Maguri Maguli
- Date of birth: 29 August 1991 (age 35)
- Place of birth: Musoma, Tanzania
- Height: 1.76 m (5 ft 9 in)
- Position: Forward

Senior career*
Years	Team	Apps	(Gls)
2012–2013	Prisons		
2013–2014	Ruvu Shooting		
2014–2015	Simba		
2015	Stand United		
2015–2016	Saham Club		
2016–2018	Dhofar Club		
2018	Kigali		
2019	Kinondoni Municipal Council		
2019	Nakambala Leopards		
2020	F.C. Platinum		

International career
2013–2017	Tanzania	18	(6)
- * Club domestic league appearances and goals

Elias Maguri (born 29 August 1991) is a Tanzanian professional footballer who plays as a forward. He formerly played for the Tanzania national team.

== Career statistics ==
Scores and results list Tanzania's goal tally first.

Goal	Date	Venue	Opponent	Score	Result	Competition
1.	14 November 2015	National Stadium, Dar es Salaam, Tanzania	Algeria	1–0	2–2	2018 FIFA World Cup qualification
2.	22 November 2015	Addis Ababa Stadium, Addis Ababa, Ethiopia	Somalia	2–0	4–0	2015 CECAFA Cup
3.	22 November 2015	Addis Ababa Stadium, Addis Ababa, Ethiopia	Somalia	3–0	4–0	2015 CECAFA Cup
4.	29 May 2016	Moi International Sports Centre, Nairobi, Kenya	Kenya	1–0	1–1	Friendly
5.	2 July 2017	Royal Bafokeng Stadium, Phokeng, South Africa	South Africa	1–0	1–0	2017 COSAFA Cup
6.	12 November 2017	Stade de l'Amitié, Cotonou, Benin	Benin	1–1	1–1	Friendly
