= Talent Chawapiwa =

Zimbabwean footballer (born 1992)

Personal information
- Date of birth: 3 June 1992 (age 34)
- Place of birth: Zimbabwe
- Position: Winger

Senior career*
Years	Team	Apps	(Gls)
2013–2016	Harare City		
2016–2017	ZPC Kariba		
2017	Platinum		
2017–2019	Baroka	42	(0)
2019–2021	AmaZulu	51	(1)
2021–2022	Sekhukhune United	8	(0)

International career^{‡}
2015–2019	Zimbabwe	28	(4)
- * Club domestic league appearances and goals as of 23 October 2022 ‡ National team caps and goals as of 23 October 2022

Talent Chawapiwa (born 3 June 1992) is a Zimbabwean professional footballer who played as a winger for the Zimbabwe national team.

== Club career ==
Chawapiwa's career started in 2013 with capital club Harare City, where he remained until 2016 when he completed a transfer to ZPC Kariba after rejecting a new contract from Harare. In early 2017, Chawapiwa joined Platinum. Seven months into the year, Chawapiwa left Zimbabwean football for the first time to join South African Premier Division side Baroka. He made his debut on 19 August in a league game against Polokwane City. Chawapiwa scored his first professional goal on 29 October in a tie against Cape Town City in the 2017 Telkom Knockout. AmaZulu signed Chawapiwa in January 2019. He scored in March versus Free State Stars.

== International career ==
During his career, Chawapiwa has made twenty-six appearances and scored five goals for the Zimbabwe national team. He was selected by Sunday Chidzambwa for the 2019 Africa Cup of Nations in Egypt.

== Career statistics ==
=== Club ===
As of 16 June 2019.

Club statistics
Club	Season	League			Cup		League Cup		Continental		Other		Total	
Club	Season	Division	Apps	Goals	Apps	Goals	Apps	Goals	Apps	Goals	Apps	Goals	Apps	Goals
Baroka	2017–18	Premier Division	25	0	2	0	2	1	—		0	0	29	1
Baroka	2018–19	Premier Division	17	0	0	0	4	0	—		0	0	21	0
Baroka	Total		42	0	2	0	6	1	—		0	0	50	1
AmaZulu	2018–19	Premier Division	8	1	—		—		—		0	0	8	1
Career total			50	1	2	0	6	1	—		0	0	58	2

=== International ===
As of 16 June 2019.

National team	Year	Apps	Goals
Zimbabwe	2015	3	1
Zimbabwe	2016	5	0
Zimbabwe	2017	7	2
Zimbabwe	2018	8	2
Zimbabwe	2019	3	0
Total		26	5

Scores and results list Zimbabwe's goal tally first.

Goal	Date	Venue	Opponent	Score	Result	Competition
1.	19 May 2015	Moruleng Stadium, Rustenburg, South Africa	Seychelles	1–0	1–0	2015 COSAFA Cup
2.	5 July 2017	Moruleng Stadium, Rustenburg, South Africa	Lesotho	3–1	4–3	2017 COSAFA Cup
3.	9 July 2017	Royal Bafokeng Stadium, Phokeng, South Africa	Zambia	2–1	3–1	2017 COSAFA Cup
4.	21 March 2018	Levy Mwanawasa Stadium, Ndola, Zambia	Zambia	2–1	2–2 (4–5 p)	2018 Four Nations Tournament
5.	24 March 2018	Levy Mwanawasa Stadium, Ndola, Zambia	Angola	2–1	2–2 (2–4 p)	2018 Four Nations Tournament

== Honours ==
Zimbabwe

- COSAFA Cup: 2017, 2018

Baroka

- Telkom Knockout: 2018
