= Ronald Ketjijere =

Namibian footballer

Personal information
- Full name: Ronald Himeekua Ketjijere
- Date of birth: 12 December 1987 (age 38)
- Place of birth: Okakarara, South-West Africa
- Height: 1.75 m (5 ft 9 in)
- Position: Midfielder

Senior career*
Years	Team	Apps	(Gls)
2007–2009	UNAM F.C		
2009–2012	African Stars		
2012–2016	University of Pretoria		

International career^{‡}
2010–	Namibia	59	(2)
- * Club domestic league appearances and goals as of 16 January 2013 ‡ National team caps and goals as of 5 June 2018

Ronald Himeekua Ketjijere (born 12 December 1987) is a Namibian football holding midfielder who plays for the Namibia national football team. He was captain of the Brave Warriors and can also play as an offensive midfielder.

He previously played for Katutura giant African Stars in the Namibia Premier League, having joined the team in 2009 from UNAM.

== Club career ==
=== UNAM F.C. ===
Ketjijere started off playing for UNAM F.C in the Khomas Second Division and was part of the squad that helped the team gain promotion to the Southern Stream First Division in 2008. His time with UNAM did not last long as he was immediately snatched up by African Stars to play in the Namibia Premier league.

=== African Stars ===
In his first season with African Stars, Ketjijere won the MTC Premiership and the Leo NFA Cup, both in the 2009/2010 season. He scored a couple of important goals for African Stars in the three seasons he played for them. He received a couple of nominations and he is one of the past recipients of the FNB Namibia Sport player of the month Award while with African Stars. He was among the top 3 contenders shortlisted for the 2011/2012 MTC Premiership Players' player of the year Award.

=== University of Pretoria ===
His inspiring performance and hard-work have not gone unnoticed, something that led to him signing a professional contract with South Africa's University of Pretoria in the 2012/2013 season. After a long wait of paperwork finalisation he finally became eligible to play in the South African elite league and he made his PSL debut, on 23 October 2012 in the Telekom knock-out Cup against Mamelodi Sundowns. He has since cemented his place in AmaTuks's first eleven.

== National team career ==
On 9 February 2011, the touring midfielder played in his Brave Warriors début against The Flames of Malawi which Namibia narrowly lost 2–1 in Windhoek, a match played at the Sam Nujoma Stadium. Since then, he never looked back and was later given the captain arm band of the national senior side.

=== International goals ===
Scores and results list Namibia's goal tally first.

No	Date	Venue	Opponent	Score	Result	Competition
1.	24 June 2016	Sam Nujoma Stadium, Windhoek, Namibia	Zambia	1–0	1–0	2016 COSAFA Cup
2.	4 July 2017	Moruleng Stadium, Moruleng, South Africa	Swaziland	1–0	1–0	2017 COSAFA Cup
