= Elvis Chipezeze =

Zimbabwean footballer (born 1990)

Personal information
- Date of birth: 11 March 1990 (age 36)
- Height: 1.80 m (5 ft 11 in)
- Position: Goalkeeper

Team information
- Current team: Magesi

Senior career*
| Years | Team | Apps | (Gls) |
| 2011 | Gweru Pirates | | |
| 2012–2018 | Chicken Inn | | |
| 2018–2022 | Baroka | 69 | (0) |
| 2022– | Magesi | 36 | (0) |

International career^{‡}
| 2019– | Zimbabwe | 9 | (0) |
- * Club domestic league appearances and goals as of 11 October 2022 ‡ National team caps and goals as of 11 October 2022

Elvis Chipezeze (born 11 March 1990) is a Zimbabwean football player. He plays in South Africa for Magesi.

== Career ==
=== Club ===
On 27 March 2018, Chipezeze joined South Africa club Baroka F.C. on a pre-contract deal. He made his league debut for the club on 29 August 2018, playing the entirety of a 1–1 draw with Highlands Park F.C.

=== International ===
He made his Zimbabwe national football team debut on 5 June 2019 in a 2019 COSAFA Cup game against Zambia. He was then selected for the 2019 Africa Cup of Nations squad. He performed dismally in the last groups stages make it or break it game between Zimbabwe and Democratic Republic of Congo where Zimbabwe lost by 4 goals to nil.

On 11 December 2025, Chipeze was called up to the Zimbabwe squad for the 2025 Africa Cup of Nations.

== Honors ==
=== Club ===
Baroka

- Telkom Knockout: 2018
