= Zicco Mkanda =

Malawian footballer

Personal information
- Full name: Zicco Lovemore Mkanda
- Date of birth: 17 December 1990 (age 35)
- Place of birth: Blantyre, Malawi
- Height: 1.82 m (6 ft 0 in)
- Position: Forward

Team information
- Current team: FCB Nyasa Big Bullets

Youth career
- 2006–2007: ESCOM United

Senior career*
Years	Team	Apps	(Gls)
2007–2008	ESCOM United	11	(3)
2009–2010	Matchedje de Maputo	42	(13)
2010–2011	Ferroviario da Beira	24	(11)
2011–2017	Liga Muçulmana de Maputo	116	(56)
2017–2018	Ferroviario de Nampula	9	(4)
2018–2020	Beforward Wanderers	62	(32)
2020–2022	Nyasa Big Bullets	31	(13)

International career^{‡}
2012–	Malawi	22	(2)
- * Club domestic league appearances and goals as of 7 August 2021 ‡ National team caps and goals as of 7 August 2021

Zicco Mkanda (born 17 December 1990) is a Malawian football coach who currently works as a Performance Analyst & Strikers Coach at FCB Nyasa Big Bullets FC.

- 2024 - Strikers Coach at Silver Strikers FC
- 2025 - Data Analyst & Strikers Coach at FCB Nyasa Big Bullets FC
