= Jones Joubert =

Seychellois footballer

Personal information
- Date of birth: February 17, 1984 (age 42)
- Place of birth: Seychelles
- Position: Defender

Team information
- Current team: Cote d'Or

Senior career*
Years	Team	Apps	(Gls)
2006–2008?	Saint Louis Suns United		
2011–2012	The Lions		
2013–	Cote d'Or		

International career
2006–	Seychelles	38	(0)
Medal record
Men's football
Representing Seychelles
Indian Ocean Island Games
Gold medal – first place	2011 Seychelles
- * Club domestic league appearances and goals

Jones Joubert (born February 17, 1984) is a Seychelles football player who plays for Cote d'Or FC. He is a defender playing for the Seychelles national football team.

== Honours ==
Seychelles

- Indian Ocean Island Games: Gold Medalist, 2011
