= Kylian Yrnard =

Belgian-born Mauritian footballer

Personal information
- Date of birth: 18 June 1995 (age 31)
- Place of birth: Belgium
- Position: Defender

Team information
- Current team: RRC Waterloo

Youth career
- –2014: Anderlecht
- 2014–2015: RAEC

Senior career*
Years	Team	Apps	(Gls)
2015	RAEC	2	(0)
2015–	RRC Waterloo		

International career^{‡}
2017–	Mauritius	3	(0)
- * Club domestic league appearances and goals as of 25 April 2015 ‡ National team caps and goals as of 13 November 2017

Kylian Yrnard (born 18 June 1995) is a Belgian-born Mauritian football player. He plays for RRC Waterloo. He also holds Belgian citizenship.

== Club career ==
He played in the 2013–14 UEFA Youth League for Anderlecht.

== International ==
He made his debut for the Mauritius national football team on 19 August 2017 in a friendly game against India.
