= Marc van Heerden =

South African soccer player

Personal information
- Full name: Marc Nathan van Heerden
- Date of birth: 16 March 1988 (age 38)
- Place of birth: Johannesburg, South Africa
- Height: 1.73 m (5 ft 8 in)
- Position: Left-back

Youth career
- Supersport United
- Pretoria University

Senior career*
Years	Team	Apps	(Gls)
2005–2008	Pretoria University	19	(1)
2008–2016	AmaZulu	125	(15)
2016–2017	Chippa United	12	(1)
2017–2018	Orlando Pirates	9	(1)
2018–2019	AmaZulu	20	(1)
2019–2022	Stellenbosch	76	(3)
2022–2024	Cape Town City	44	(0)
Total		308	(22)

International career^{‡}
2013–2015	South Africa	5	(0)
- * Club domestic league appearances and goals as of 16 August 2024 ‡ National team caps and goals as of 16 August 2024

Marc van Heerden (born 16 March 1988) is a retired South African soccer player who played as a left-back in the Premier Soccer League. He is equally adept at playing centre back and defensive midfielder.

== Career overview ==
Van Heerden left AmaZulu F.C. for Chippa United F.C. in 2016, following AmaZulu F.C.'s unsuccessful campaign to gain promotion from the National First Division to the Premier Soccer League. In 2017 Van Heerden made the switch to Orlando Pirates from Chippa United F.C. Van Heerden returned to AmaZulu in 2018, this after both he and Orlando Pirates agreed to mutually terminate his contract.

He announced his retirement in 2024 following two years with Cape Town City.

== International career ==
Van Heerden made his international debut for South Africa in a 2–0 victory against Burkina Faso on 17 August 2013.
