= Zinedine Catraio =

Angolan footballer

Personal information
- Full name: Zinedine Zidane Moisés Catraio
- Date of birth: 17 June 1998 (age 28)
- Position: Midfielder

Team information
- Current team: 1º de Agosto

Senior career*
Years	Team	Apps	(Gls)
2017–	1º de Agosto	6	(0)
2019	→ ASA (loan)	1	(0)

International career^{‡}
2017	Angola U20	3	(0)
2016–	Angola	1	(0)
- * Club domestic league appearances and goals as of 11:44, 15 September 2020 (UTC) ‡ National team caps and goals as of 11:44, 9 July 2019 (UTC)

Zinedine Zidane Moisés Catraio (born 17 June 1998), commonly known as Zinedine Catraio, is an Angolan footballer who currently plays as a midfielder for 1º de Agosto.

== Career statistics ==
=== Club ===
As of 15 September 2020.

He was named after Zinedine Zidane

Club	Season	League			Cup		Continental		Other		Total	
Club	Season	Division	Apps	Goals	Apps	Goals	Apps	Goals	Apps	Goals	Apps	Goals
1º de Agosto	2017	Girabola	2	0	2 (Note: Appearances in the Taça de Angola)	0	–		0	0	4	0
1º de Agosto	2018	Girabola	0	0	0	0	0	0	0	0	0	0
1º de Agosto	2018–19	Girabola	0	0	0	0	0	0	0	0	0	0
1º de Agosto	2019–20	Girabola	4	0	1	0	1 (Note: Appearances in the CAF Champions League)	0	0	0	6	0
1º de Agosto	Total		6	0	2	0	0	0	0	0	8	0
ASA	2018–19	Girabola	1	0	0	0	–		0	0	1	0
Career total			7	0	3	0	1	0	0	0	11	0

=== International ===
As of matches played 23 September 2018.

National team	Year	Apps	Goals
Angola	2016	1	0
Total		1	0
