= Thembela Sikhakhane =

South African footballer

Personal information
- Full name: Thembela Sikhakhane
- Date of birth: 24 January 1993 (age 33)
- Place of birth: Ulundi, South Africa
- Height: 1.70 m (5 ft 7 in)
- Position: Right-back

Team information
- Current team: AmaZulu
- Number: 5

Youth career
- Double Classic

Senior career*
Years	Team	Apps	(Gls)
–2013	Gqikazi All Stars		
2013–2016	Golden Arrows	66	(0)
2016–2020	Orlando Pirates	10	(0)
2017–2020	→ AmaZulu (loan)	49	(0)
2020–	AmaZulu	92	(2)

International career^{‡}
2016–	South Africa	3	(0)
- * Club domestic league appearances and goals as of 7 July 2024 ‡ National team caps and goals as of 7 July 2023

Thembela Sikhakhane (born 24 January 1993) is a South African professional soccer player who plays as a right-back for AmaZulu.

== Career ==
He was born in Ulundi.

Sikhakhane began his playing career with Vodacom League team Gqikazi All Stars. He joined Golden Arrows in January 2013 on a three-year deal.

Sikhakhane was called up for South Africa for the 2016 COSAFA Cup and the 2023 COSAFA Cup.
