= Mohau Mokate =

South African soccer player

Personal information
- Date of birth: 18 June 1991 (age 35)
- Place of birth: Rustenburg, South Africa
- Position: Centre forward

Team information
- Current team: TS Sporting

Senior career*
| Years | Team | Apps | (Gls) |
| –2014 | Orbit College | | |
| 2014–2019 | Maritzburg United | 99 | (18) |
| 2019–2020 | Ajax Cape Town | 10 | (0) |
| 2021–2022 | TS Sporting | 40 | (10) |
| 2022– | Polokwane City | 4 | (0) |

International career^{‡}
| 2017 | South Africa | 3 | (1) |
- * Club domestic league appearances and goals as of 11 November 2022 ‡ National team caps and goals as of 11 November 2022

Mohau Mokate (born 18 June 1991) is a South African soccer player who plays as a centre forward for Polokwane City. He has represented the South Africa national football team.

== Club career ==
Born in Rustenburg, Mokate started his career at Orbit College, before signing for Maritzburg United in 2014.

After leaving Maritzburg United in August 2019, he signed for Ajax Cape Town two months later.

In January 2021, Mokate signed for TS Sporting.

== International career ==
After making his debut for South Africa on 2 July 2017, Mokate scored his first goal for South Africa on 7 July 2017 with the only goal of the 2017 COSAFA Cup final against Namibia.
