= Xolani Mlambo =

South African footballer

Personal information
- Full name: Xolani Mlambo
- Date of birth: 24 June 1991 (age 35)
- Place of birth: Johannesburg, South Africa
- Height: 1.77 m (5 ft 10 in)
- Position: Midfielder

Team information
- Current team: Marumo Gallants
- Number: 4

Youth career
- Columbus FC

Senior career*
Years	Team	Apps	(Gls)
2015–2016	Cape Town All Stars	4	(0)
2016	Chippa United	16	(2)
2016–2017	Bidvest Wits	13	(0)
2017–2020	Orlando Pirates	36	(0)
2020–2022	AmaZulu	43	(1)
2022–2024	TS Galaxy	23	(1)
2024–	Marumo Gallants	5	(0)
- * Club domestic league appearances and goals as of 12 November 2024

Xolani Mlambo (born 24 June 1991 in Johannesburg) is a South African football midfielder who plays for Marumo Gallants in the South African Premier Division.
