= Chabalala (Angolan footballer) =

Angolan footballer

Personal information
- Full name: Gaspar Necas Fortunato
- Date of birth: 23 September 1999 (age 27)
- Place of birth: Luanda, Angola
- Height: 1.62 m (5 ft 4 in)
- Position: Forward

Team information
- Current team: Salgueiros

Senior career*
Years	Team	Apps	(Gls)
2016	Académica Lobito	9	(2)
2017	Progresso Sambizanga	2	(0)
2018–2020	Académica Lobito	16	(1)
2020	Freamunde	10	(8)
2021–	Salgueiros	1	(1)

International career^{‡}
2016	Angola	4	(0)
- * Club domestic league appearances and goals as of 11:44, 15 September 2021 (UTC) ‡ National team caps and goals as of 11:44, 15 September 2021 (UTC)

Gaspar Necas Fortunato (born 23 September 1999), commonly known as Tshabalala, is an Angolan footballer who currently plays as a forward for Aliados Futebol Clube de Lordelo.

== Career statistics ==
=== Club ===
As of 2 December 2020.

Club	Season	League			Cup		Continental		Other		Total	
Club	Season	Division	Apps	Goals	Apps	Goals	Apps	Goals	Apps	Goals	Apps	Goals
Académica do Lobito	2016	Girabola	9	2	0	0	–		0	0	9	2
Progresso Sambizanga	2017	Girabola	2	0	1 (Note: Appearances in the Taça de Angola)	0	–		0	0	3	0
Académica do Lobito	2018	Girabola	4	0	0	0	–		0	0	4	0
Académica do Lobito	2018–19	Girabola	12	1	1	0	–		0	0	13	1
Académica do Lobito	Total		16	1	1	0	0	0	0	0	17	1
Freamunde	2020–21	Porto FA Elite Division	10	8	0	0	–		0	0	10	8
Salgueiros	2020–21	Campeonato de Portugal	1	1	0	0	–		0	0	1	1
Career total			38	12	2	0	0	0	0	0	40	12

=== International ===
As of matches played 15 September 2021.

National team	Year	Apps	Goals
Angola	2016	4	0
Total		4	0
