= Basil Bertin =

Seychellois footballer

Personal information
- Date of birth: 12 June 1984 (age 42)
- Position: Midfielder

Team information
- Current team: Northern Dynamo FC

Senior career*
| Years | Team | Apps | (Gls) |
| 2012– | Northern Dynamo FC | | |

International career
| 2015–2018 | Seychelles | 6 | (0) |
- * Club domestic league appearances and goals

Basil Bertin (born 7 February 1992) is a Seychellois football midfielder who plays for Northern Dynamo FC. He was a squad member for the 2016 COSAFA Cup.
