= Virgil Vries =

Namibian footballer (born 1989)

Personal information
- Full name: Virgil Christo Vries
- Date of birth: 29 March 1989 (age 37)
- Place of birth: Keetmanshoop, South West Africa
- Height: 1.82 m (5 ft 11 1/2 in)
- Position: Goalkeeper

Team information
- Current team: La Masia

Youth career
- Luton FC

Senior career*
Years	Team	Apps	(Gls)
–2008	Fedics United		
2008–2011	Eleven Arrows		
2011–2012	Golden Arrows	5	(0)
2012	→ Carara Kicks (loan)		
2012–2013	Orlando Pirates		
2013–2017	Maritzburg United	59	(0)
2017–2018	Baroka	20	(0)
2018–2019	Kaizer Chiefs	5	(0)
2019–2023	Moroka Swallows	52	(0)
2024-	La Masia	17	(0)

International career^{‡}
2009–	Namibia	39	(0)
- * Club domestic league appearances and goals as of 26 April 2024 (UTC) ‡ National team caps and goals as of 13 February 2023

Virgil Vries (born 29 March 1989) is a Namibian football goalkeeper who plays for South African club MM Platinum.

== Club career ==
In January 2012 he was loaned to second division side Carara Kicks.

Later in 2012, he signed a short-term contract with Orlando Pirates in the Namibian Premier League. In January 2013 he goes to Maritzburg United F.C. in the Premier Soccer League. Since then he made 27 appearances for the club and keep a clean sheet in eight games and conceding in these games 23 goals.

Leaving Kaizer Chiefs in the summer 2019, Vries joined Moroka Swallows on 26 September 2019.

== International career ==
Virgil Vries is eligible to play for Namibia. He made his debut for the Namibia national football team on the 4 June 2011 against the Burkina Faso national football team in a 1–4 loss for Namibia. As of 1 June 2014 he has played 11 games for Namibia and kept a clean sheet in five games.
