= Siyabonga Mdluli =

Swazi footballer (born 1986)

Personal information
- Date of birth: 26 August 1986 (age 40)
- Position: Defender

Team information
- Current team: Green Mamba F.C.

Senior career*
Years	Team	Apps	(Gls)
- Green Mamba F.C.

International career
	Eswatini	5	(0)
- * Club domestic league appearances and goals as of 13 December 2016

Siyabonga Msholozi Mdluli (born 26 August 1986) is a liSwati footballer playing for Swazi Premier League side Green Mamba F.C.

== Career ==
Siyabonga is the captain of Swaziland national football team. In the 2016 COSAFA Cup semifinals match against South Africa, his team was leading by 1-0 against half time, only for Siyabonga to get red carded for a foul on Judas Moseamedi. The South Africans prevailed 5-1 ultimately, and went on to become the champions in the final.

Siyabongo assaulted Royal Leopards F.C.'s Zweli ‘Mlilo’ Nxumalo during the second-leg semifinals of the 2015 Swazi Premier League. He later apologised for the incident.
