= Jemondre Dickens =

South African soccer player

Personal information
- Date of birth: 22 April 1998 (age 28)
- Position: Forward

Team information
- Current team: Chippa United

Senior career*
Years	Team	Apps	(Gls)
2018–2021	Baroka	28	(3)
2019–2020	→ TS Sporting (loan)	9	(1)
2021–	Chippa United	6	(0)

International career^{‡}
2019	South Africa	2	(0)
- * Club domestic league appearances and goals as of 11 October 2022 ‡ National team caps and goals as of 11 October 2022

Jemondre Dickens (born 22 April 1998) is a South African soccer player who plays as a forward for South African Premier Division club Chippa United. He has been capped for the South Africa national team. He also spent time with TS Sporting on loan in December 2019.
