= José Guirrugo =

Mozambican footballer

Personal information
- Full name: José Ventura Guirrugo
- Date of birth: 3 June 1992 (age 34)
- Place of birth: Maputo, Mozambique
- Height: 1.81 m (5 ft 11 in)
- Position: Goalkeeper

Team information
- Current team: Songo
- Number: 29

Senior career*
Years	Team	Apps	(Gls)
2011–2014	Costa do Sol		
2014–2015	Maxaquene		
2015–2016	Songo		
2016–2017	Maxaquene		
2017–2019	Costa do Sol		
2019	Incomáti Xinavane	5	(0)
2019–	Songo	8	(0)

International career^{‡}
2011–	Mozambique	15	(0)
- * Club domestic league appearances and goals as of 22 July 2020 ‡ National team caps and goals as of 22 July 2020

José Ventura Guirrugo (born 3 June 1992) is a Mozambican footballer who plays as a goalkeeper for UD Songo and the Mozambique national football team.

== Career ==
=== International ===
Guirrugo made his senior international debut on 23 April 2011 in a 2-0 friendly victory over Tanzania.

== Career statistics ==
=== International ===
As of matches played 13 October 2019.

National team	Year	Apps	Goals
Mozambique	2011	1	0
Mozambique	2015	2	0
Mozambique	2016	5	0
Mozambique	2017	1	0
Mozambique	2018	3	0
Mozambique	2019	3	0
Total		15	0
