= Lesenya Ramoraka =

Motswana footballer

Personal information
- Date of birth: 4 April 1994 (age 32)
- Place of birth: Mahalapye, Botswana
- Height: 1.70 m (5 ft 7 in)
- Position: Left back

Team information
- Current team: Highlands Park

Senior career*
Years	Team	Apps	(Gls)
2013–2018	Orapa United		
2018–	Highlands Park	29	(1)

International career^{‡}
2016–	Botswana	19	(0)
- * Club domestic league appearances and goals as of 21:08, 18 August 2020 (UTC) ‡ National team caps and goals as of 21:08, 18 August 2020 (UTC)

Lesenya Ramoraka (born 4 April 1994- 4 October 2022) was a Motswana footballer who played as a left back for South African Premier Division side Highlands Park.

== Career statistics ==
=== Club ===
As of 18 August 2020

Appearances and goals by club, season and competition
Club	Season	League			National Cup		League Cup		Other		Total	
Club	Season	Division	Apps	Goals	Apps	Goals	Apps	Goals	Apps	Goals	Apps	Goals
Highlands Park	2018–19	South African Premier Division	21	1	1	0	1	0	0	0	23	1
Highlands Park	2019–20	South African Premier Division	8	0	2	0	0	0	2 (Note: Appearance(s) in MTN 8)	0	12	0
Career total			29	1	3	0	1	0	2	0	35	1

=== International ===
As of 18 August 2020

Appearances and goals by national team and year
National team	Year	Apps	Goals
Botswana	2016	7	0
Botswana	2017	1	0
Botswana	2018	10	0
Botswana	2019	1	0
Total		19	0
