= Raphael Loth =

Tanzanian footballer

Personal information
- Full name: Raphael Daudi Loth
- Date of birth: 9 November 1996 (age 29)
- Place of birth: Itigi, Tanzania
- Height: 1.72 m (5 ft 8 in)
- Position: Midfielder

Team information
- Current team: IHEFU S.C.
- Number: 29

Senior career*
Years	Team	Apps	(Gls)
2014–2017	Mbeya City		
2017–	Young Africans		

International career^{‡}
2017	Tanzania	8	(0)
- * Club domestic league appearances and goals as of 1 August 2020 ‡ National team caps and goals as of 14 April 2021

Raphael Loth (born 9 November 1996) is a Tanzanian football midfielder who plays for Young Africans.
