= Lime Hotspurs F.C. =

Zambian football club

Lime Hotspur
- Full name: Lime Hotspurs Football Club
- Ground: Indeni Sports Complex; Ndola, Zambia
- Capacity: 5,000
- Chairman: ?
- Manager: ?
- League: Zambian Premier League
Home colours

Lime Hotspurs Football Club is a Zambian football club based in Ndola. They play in the top division of Zambian football, the Zambian Premier League.

The clubs plays in white and black kits.

== Stadium ==
Currently the team plays at the 5,000 capacity Indeni Sports Complex.
