= Taddeo Lwanga =

Ugandan footballer (born 1994)

Personal information
- Date of birth: 21 May 1994 (age 32)
- Place of birth: Kampala, Uganda
- Height: 1.82 m (6 ft 0 in)
- Position: Midfielder

Team information
- Current team: Vipers Sc
- Number: 4

Senior career*
Years	Team	Apps	(Gls)
2014–2015	Express FC	45	(5)
2015–2017	SC Villa	50	(8)
2017–2019	Vipers SC		
2019–20	Tanta	11	
2020–22	Simba		
2022	Arta/Solar7	1	(0)
2023–	APR F.C.	0	(0)

International career^{‡}
2015–	Uganda	26	(1)
- * Club domestic league appearances and goals as of 18 November 2022 ‡ National team caps and goals as of 00:48, 22 August 2022 (UTC)

Taddeo Lwanga (born 21 May 1994) is a Ugandan professional footballer and software engineer who plays for Vipers Sc in the Uganda Premier League and the Uganda national team as a midfielder.

== Early life ==
At a young age, he was a member of Ndejje United F.C in the second division before engaged in the Buganda Masaza cup for Kyadondo.

== Club career ==
=== Express FC ===
In January 2014, Lwanga joined Express FC. He debuted for Express FC against Police FC on 11 February 2014. He scored his first goal for Express FC against Lweza Football Club on 21 November 2014.

=== SC Villa ===
In 2015, he joined SC Villa making his debut on against Bright Stars in Mwererwe on 25 August 2015. He marked a memorable time at Sports Club Villa with the winning goal against Sudan's Al Khartoum SC in the CAF Confederations Cup in February 2016. Taddeo had an impressive season helping the SC Villa finish second in Uganda Premier League.

=== Vipers SC ===
In 2017, Lwanga joined Vipers SC and sealed a two-year deal with them. He made his debut on against Bright Stars FC on 12 September 2017. He scored his first goal for Vipers SC against Proline FC on 24 December 2017 at St. Mary's Stadium.

Lwanga played his first game of the 2018–19 season on 28 September 2018 against Ndejje University at St. Mary's Stadium, Vipers won 1–0. He scored his first goal in the season against Proline in the Uganda Cup at StarTimes Stadium Lugoggo on 12 March 2019. He played his last game in the season against Bul FC on 4 May 2019 at St. Mary's Stadium. He played a total of 23 matches in the season. Vipers finished second in the league.

=== Tanta ===
In August 2019, Lwanga joined Egyptian Premier League side Tanta SC.

=== Simba SC ===
On 2 December 2020, Lwanga joined Simba SC on a two-year contract deal.

=== Arta/Solar7 ===
On 19 August 2022, Lwanga joined Arta/Solar7 as a free agent on a two-year contract deal.

=== APR F.C. ===
In July 2023, Lwanga joined APR F.C. on a two-year contract.

== International career ==
Taddeo made his debut for the Uganda national team against the Malawi national team in a friendly match at Kamuzu Stadium.

== Career statistics ==
=== International ===
As of matches played on 15 August 2019

Uganda national team
Year	Apps	Goals
2015	1	0
2016	0	0
2017	3	0
2018	7	0
2019	10	1
2020	0	0
2021	5	0
2022	0	0
Total	26	1

== Honours ==
=== Club ===
SC Villa

- FUFA Super Cup runners-up: 2015

Vipers SC

- Ugandan Cup runners-up: 2017–18
- Ugandan Premier League: 2017–18

=== Individual ===
- Team of the Year Uganda Azam Premier League (1): 2016–17
- Airtel FUFA Player of the Year Awards Nominee (1): 2016–17
