= Timothy Awany =

Ugandan footballer (born 1996)

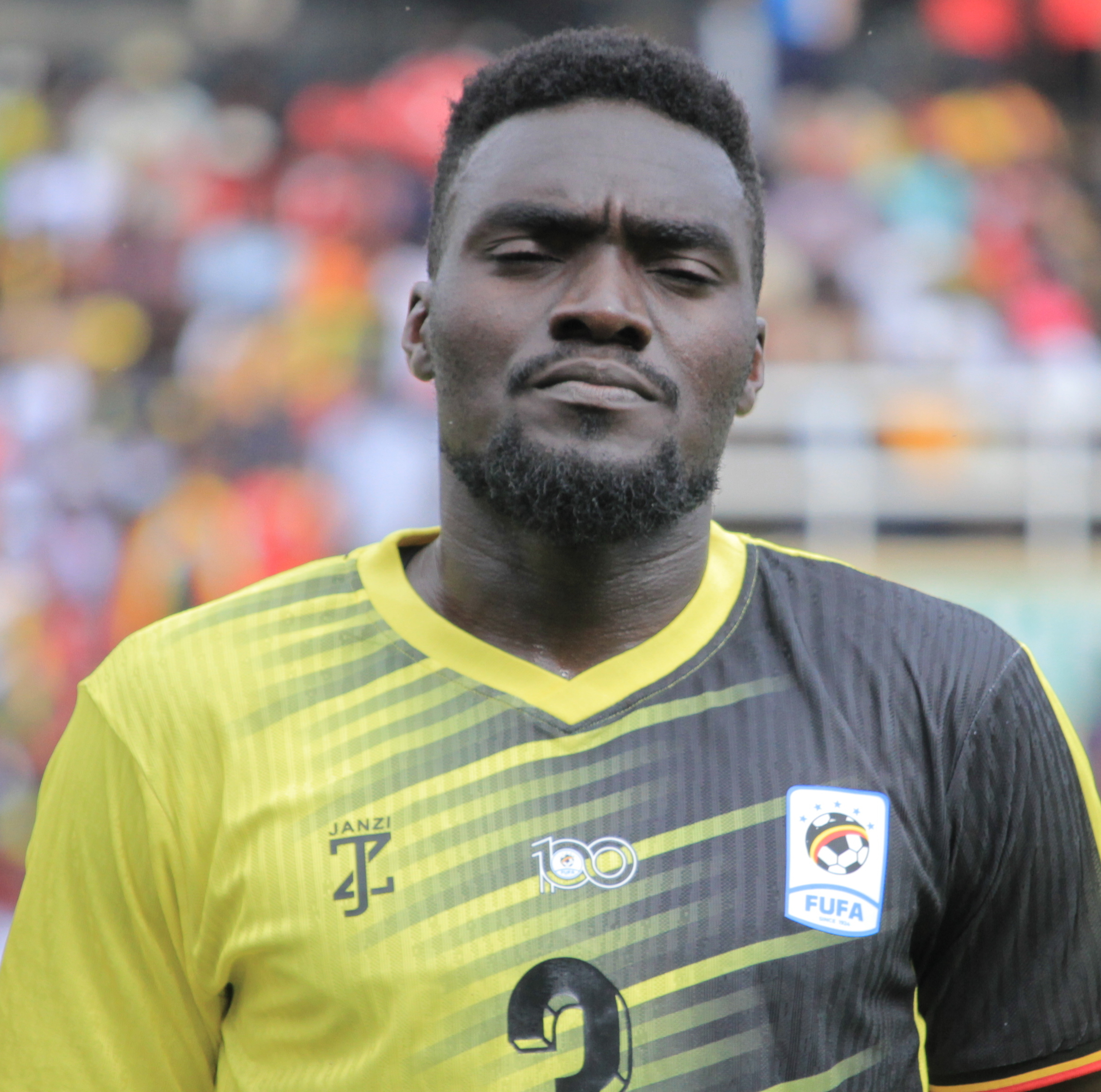
- Awany with Uganda

Personal information
- Full name: Timothy Dennis Awany
- Date of birth: 6 August 1996 (age 30)
- Place of birth: Kampala, Uganda
- Height: 1.76 m (5 ft 9 in)
- Position: Defender

Team information
- Current team: Botev Plovdiv
- Number: 20

Senior career*
Years	Team	Apps	(Gls)
2014–2019	KCCA		
2019–2026	Ashdod	179	(1)
2026–	Botev Plovdiv	4	(0)

International career^{‡}
2016–	Uganda	40	(0)
- * Club domestic league appearances and goals as of 16:00, 6 October 2026 (UTC) ‡ National team caps and goals as of 20:25, 22 June 2026 (UTC)

Timothy Dennis Awany (born 6 August 1996) is a Ugandan professional footballer who plays as a defender for Bulgarian First League club Botev Plovdiv and the Uganda national team.

== Club career ==
Awany played for Kampala Capital City Authority.

In July 2019, he joined Israeli Premier League side F.C. Ashdod. He left the club in June 2026 after seven years, having made 190 appearances across all competitions. Later that month he signed for Bulgarian club Botev Plovdiv.

== International career ==
Awany made his international debut with the Uganda national team in 2016, and was named in the squad for the 2017 Africa Cup of Nations.

On December 7, 2025, he was selected by Paul Put for Uganda's squad to participate in the 2025 Africa Cup of Nations.

== Career statistics ==
As of matches played on 7 May 2022

Appearances and goals by national team and year
National team	Year	Apps	Goals
Uganda	2016	3	0
Uganda	2017	10	0
Uganda	2018	6	0
Uganda	2019	10	0
Uganda	2020	2	0
Uganda	2021	3	0
Total		34	0
