= King Nadolo =

Zimbabwean footballer (born 1995)

Personal information
- Full name: King Munyaradzi Nadolo
- Date of birth: 4 December 1995 (age 30)
- Place of birth: Harare, Zimbabwe
- Height: 1.76 m (5 ft 9 in)
- Position: Midfielder

Team information
- Current team: Dynamos Harare

Senior career*
Years	Team	Apps	(Gls)
2014–2018	Highlanders		
2018–2019	Witbank Spurs	4	(0)
2019–2020	TelOne F.C.		(11)
2020–	Dynamos Harare		

International career^{‡}
2016–	Zimbabwe	5	(0)
- * Club domestic league appearances and goals as of 25 January 2021 ‡ National team caps and goals as of 25 January 2021

King Munyaradzi Nadolo (born 4 December 1995) is a Zimbabwean footballer who plays as a midfielder for Dynamos F.C. and the Zimbabwe national football team.

== Career ==
=== Club ===
Nadolo began his senior career with Highlanders F.C. in his native Zimbabwe, breaking into the senior squad in 2014. By 2016, Nadolo had attracted attention from abroad, going on trial in South Africa.

Two years later, Nadolo made a move to South Africa, signing with National First Division club Witbank Spurs. He made his competitive debut for the club on 3 February 2018, coming on as a 68th-minute substitute for Peter Mubayiwa in a 2–1 home victory over Real Kings F.C. After less than a year with the club, and after making just four league appearances, Nadolo returned to Zimbabwe, signing with Telone F.C.

In February 2020, Nadolo joined Dynamos Harare.

=== International ===
Nadolo made his senior international debut on 13 June 2016, coming on as a 76th-minute substitute for Charlton Mashumba in a 0–0 draw with Madagascar at the 2016 COSAFA Cup. He was named in the Zimbabwe squad for the 2020 African Nations Championship, playing all three group matches as Zimbabwe exited in the group stages.
