= Hendrick Moyo =

Motswana footballer

Personal information
- Date of birth: 9 May 1989 (age 37)
- Place of birth: Tutume, Botswana
- Height: 1.70 m (5 ft 7 in)
- Position: Forward

Team information
- Current team: Police XI

Senior career*
Years	Team	Apps	(Gls)
2009–2012	Extension Gunners		
2012–2014	BMC Lobatse		
2014–2015	Orapa United		
2015–2016	Gaborone United		
2016–	Police XI		

International career^{‡}
2015–2017	Botswana	14	(0)
- * Club domestic league appearances and goals as of 1 September 2020 ‡ National team caps and goals as of 1 September 2020

Hendrick Moyo (born 9 May 1989) is a Motswana footballer who plays as a striker for Police XI.
