= Webster Mulenga =

Zambian footballer (born 1993)

Personal information
- Date of birth: 27 June 1993 (age 33)
- Place of birth: Lusaka, Zambia
- Position: Striker

Team information
- Current team: Nakambala Leopards F.C.

Senior career*
Years	Team	Apps	(Gls)
2009–2016	Nakambala Leopards F.C.		
2016–2018	Red Arrows F.C.		
2018	Nakambala Leopards F.C.		
2019–2020	Red Arrows F.C.		

International career^{‡}
2017	Zambia	4	(0)
- * Club domestic league appearances and goals ‡ National team caps and goals as of 17 July 2021

Webster Mulenga (born 27 June 1993) is a Zambian footballer who most recently played as a forward for Red Arrows F.C. and the Zambia national football team.

== Career ==
Mulenga made his senior international debut on 13 June 2017 in a 2–1 victory over South Africa.

In September 2020, after two years with the club, Mulenga was released by Red Arrows F.C.

== Career statistics ==
=== International ===
As of matches played 9 July 2017.

National team	Year	Apps	Goals
Zambia	2017	4	0
Total		4	0
