= Limbikani Mzava =

Malawian footballer

Personal information
- Full name: Limbikani Oscar Mzava
- Date of birth: 12 November 1993 (age 33)
- Place of birth: Blantyre, Malawi
- Height: 1.90 m (6 ft 3 in)
- Position: Centre back

Team information
- Current team: Penang
- Number: 5

Senior career*
Years	Team	Apps	(Gls)
2009–2011	ESCOM United		
2011–2015	Bloemfontein Celtic	54	(0)
2015–2016	Mpumalanga Black Aces	22	(0)
2016–2019	Lamontville Golden Arrows	83	(4)
2019–2020	Highlands Park	17	(0)
2020–2022	AmaZulu	19	(0)
2024–2025	Magesi		
2025–	Penang		

International career^{‡}
- Malawi U17
2009–	Malawi	60	(2)
- * Club domestic league appearances and goals as of 23 October 2022 ‡ National team caps and goals as of 23 October 2022

Limbikani Oscar Mzava (born 12 November 1993) is a Malawian professional footballer who plays as a centre back for Malaysia Super League club Penang.

== Club career ==
Born in Blantyre, Mzava joined Bloemfontein Celtic from Malawian side ESCOM United in 2011.

He moved to Mpumalanga Black Aces for the 2015–16 season.

On 22 July 2025, Mzava signed with the Malaysia Super League club Penang on a permanent deal.

== International career ==
He made his international debut for Malawi in 2009. At youth level he captained the national under-17 team at the 2009 African U-17 Championship. He was included in Malawi's squad for the 2021 Africa Cup of Nations.
