= Phokeng =

Phokeng Magatostad
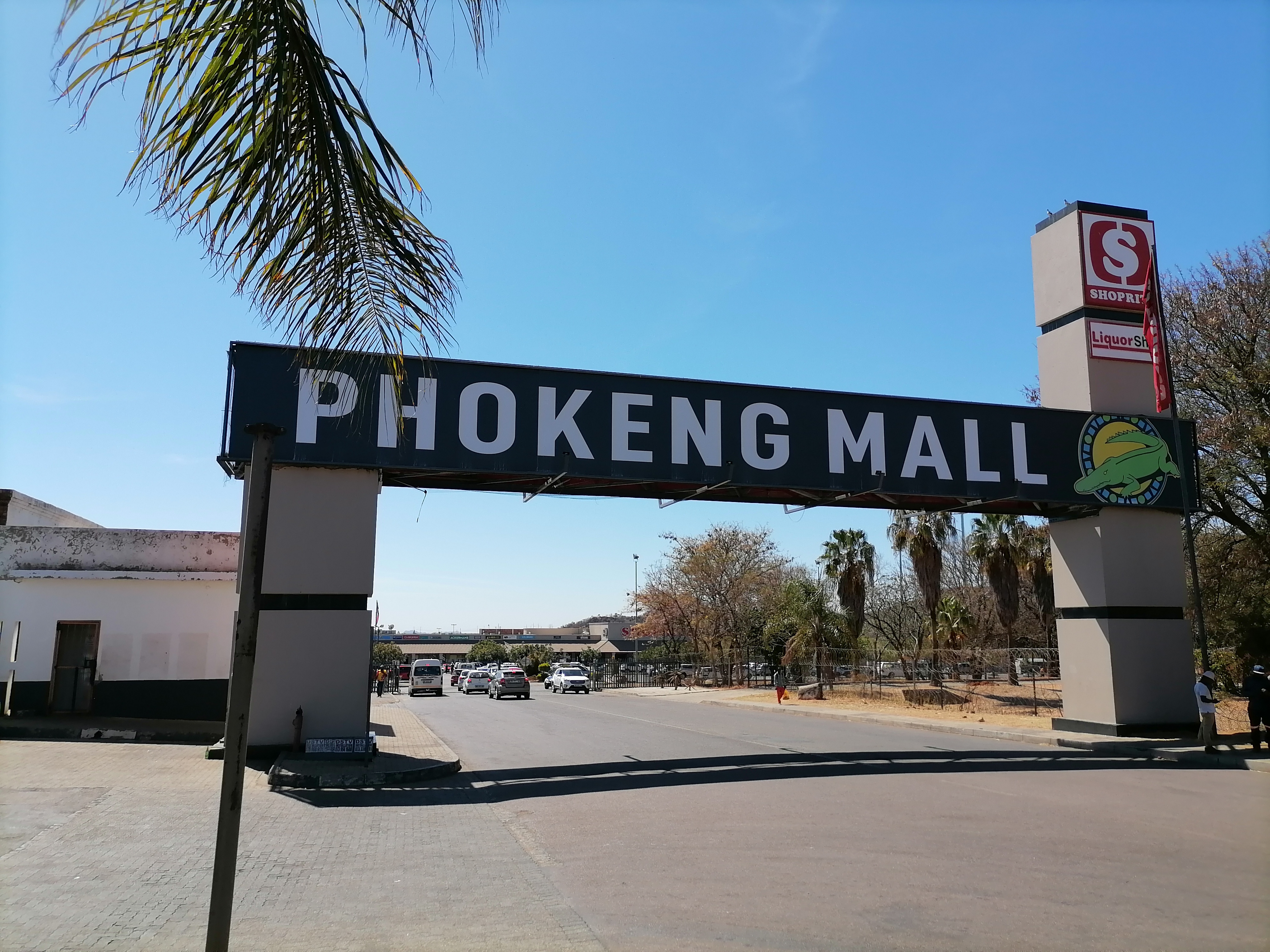
- Photo of Heke ya Phokeng Entance

- Location within North West (South African province) Location within South Africa
- Coordinates: 25°35′S 27°08′E
- Country: South Africa
- Province: North West
- District: Bojanala Platinum
- Municipality: Rustenburg
- Established: 1140

Government
  - Type: Monarchy
  - King: Kgosi (King) Leruo Molotlegi (Bafokeng)

Area
  - Total: 34.28 km^{2} (13.24 sq mi)

Population (2011)
  - Total: 34,597
  - Density: 1,009/km^{2} (2,614/sq mi)

Racial makeup (2011)
  - Black African: 99.1%
  - Coloured: 0.3%
  - Indian/Asian: 0.1%
  - White: 0.1%
  - Other: 0.4%

First languages (2011)
  - Tswana: 77.1%
  - English: 6.2%
  - Zulu: 3.2%
  - Tsonga: 2.1%
  - Other: 11.4%
- Time zone: UTC+2 (SAST)
- Postal code (street): 0335
- PO box: 0335
- Area code: 014
- Website: www.bafokengplatinum.co.za

Phokeng is a suburb in Rustenburg of the North West province of South Africa. It is the capital of the Royal Bafokeng Nation. Historically, it was known as Magatostad among white South Africans.

== Etymology ==
Phokeng gained its name from the Sesotho word for dew, Phoka, hence Place of dew. It is believed to have first been settled in the late 17th century.

== History ==
Phokeng is one of a number of BaTswana towns in the North West Province that were founded by Sotho-Tswana people who had been displaced by years of war in the late 18th and early 19th centuries – first the Difaqane wars caused by the invasion of the Matebele, and then the wars of conquest by the Boers. Just a few years after the wars, the famous missionary and explorer, David Livingstone, visited the Bakwena of chief Mokgatle, and found that in addition to farming and raising cattle, they made ornaments out of copper that they mined and smelted themselves.

The BaTswana people of the area had been living in the area for hundreds of years, but by the mid-19th century, many had been scattered among Boer farms and indentured to work for white farmers. Several chiefs began gathering their old followers around the 1850s and 1860s, asking for donations of cattle to create a fund to purchase land. With the help of German missionaries of the Hermannsburg Mission Society, several chiefs succeeded in buying land and re-establishing villages and chiefdoms. Phokeng was the largest and most famous of these villages in what was then the Western Transvaal. The chief who organized the purchases was named Chief Mokgatle, and the missionary who helped him was named Reverend Penzhorn. In 1908, a very old man who lived in Phokeng told a court how the Bafokeng of Phokeng bought their land:

We were told once that the land in which we lived was white man's land. We were told we [could] buy from the white man, a white man could take transfer for us. The tribe determined to buy land and all contributed to buy [the chief's, i.e., Mokgatle Mokgatle's] kraal. Then it was allowed that any petty chief should buy themselves ground. The chief [Mokgatle] said those who were able to do so could. My father was there and he told me.

By 1900, there were many such villages scattered through this part of the Transvaal, including the Bakwena Ba Magopa villages of Bethanie, Kgabalatsane and Ga-Rankuwa and the Bakgatla village of Saulspoort north of the Pilanesberg mountains.

One thing that made these villages unusual was that they owned the land somewhat in the way white people did. In other words, villages like Phokeng were not just "reserves", but were owned by villagers, although through a system of trusts controlled by the missionaries and the chief. For this reason, when platinum was discovered under the lands of Phokeng, the chiefdom was able to earn some revenue from mining and at one point, the Bakwena Bafokeng of Phokeng were described as one of the wealthiest tribes in South Africa.

Phokeng was included in the "Scheduled Native Areas" under the 1913 Natives Land Act. This essentially transformed Phokeng and its surrounding lands into a "reserve".

One of South Africa's most important African writers of the 20th century, Naboth Mokgatle, was from Phokeng. He wrote a memoir entitled Autobiography of an Unknown South African; the first chapters of the book contain a very detailed description of what it was like to grow up in the village in the late-early 20th century. He describes wearing traditional clothing made of animal skins, walking far off into the veld herding cattle for his father and uncle and working for neighbouring white farmers.

By the 1930s, an African-American minister, Rev. Spooner, had come to live in Phokeng and he founded a church that was separate from the German missionary church. The split between Christians who followed the German missionaries and those who followed the new churches created a great deal of turmoil in the 1930s in all these villages, including Phokeng.

During the apartheid era, the "reserve" that Phokeng was part of was transformed into the "homeland" of Bophutatswana.

== People ==
The inhabitants are part of the Batswana tribe and their totem is a crocodile, and they refer to each as kwena meaning crocodile in Setswana and Sesotho languages or the person from Bafokeng areas as Mokwena or Mmanape.

=== Demographics (2001) ===
- Area: 1.82 square kilometres (0.70 sq mi)
- Population: 2,111: 1,157.5 inhabitants per square kilometre (2,998/sq mi)
- Households: 591: 324.06 per square kilometre (839.3/sq mi)

Gender	Population	%
Female	1,026	48.6
Male	1,085	51.4

Race	Population	%
Black	2,111	100
White	0	0
Coloured	0	0
Asian	0	0

First language	Population	%
Setswana	1,962	92.89
IsiXhosa	66	3.13
Afrikaans	15	0.71
Sepedi	12	0.57
IsiZulu	21	0.99
English	6	0
Sesotho	12	0.57
Xitsonga	0	0
SiSwati	6	0.28
Tshivenda	0	0
IsiNdebele	0	0
Other	18	0.85

== Sport ==
The Royal Bafokeng Stadium, a venue for the 2009 FIFA Confederations Cup and the 2010 FIFA World Cup, is located in Phokeng. The England national football team was based in Phokeng during the 2010 FIFA World Cup.
