= Moruleng Stadium =

Sports stadium in Moruleng, South Africa

- Interactive map of Moruleng Stadium
- Location: Moruleng, Section, Moruleng, 0313, South Africa
- Coordinates: 25°09′24″S 27°10′32″E
- Owner: Bakgatla
- Operator: Bakgatla
- Capacity: 20,000

Construction
- Opened: 2009
- Cost: R174 million
- Architect: Paton Taylor Architects
- Structural engineer: Arup

Moruleng Stadium is a multi-purpose stadium in the village of Moruleng, a small mining community located approximately 60 kilometres (37 mi) from Rustenburg in the North West Province, South Africa. It has mostly been used for soccer matches and served as the home stadium of Platinum Stars. The stadium was part of Rustenburg's World Cup 2010 host city proposals and was also used as a training venue for the 2009 FIFA Confederations Cup.

== Construction ==
The stadium was constructed by South African companies Stefanutti Stocks and Omnistruct Nkosi with help from structural engineers Arup of Durban. The stadium was designed by the Durban-based architectural firm Paton Taylor Architects to comply with FIFA stadium regulations, in order for it to be utilised for the 2009 FIFA Confederations Cup as a training venue. The quantity surveyors on this project were BTKM - Bham Tayob Khan Matunda.

The stadium was built by the Bakgatla-Ba-Kgafela tribe, which is scattered across 32 villages in the North West province. The tribe's main source of wealth comes from mining platinum.

== Use ==
The stadium was opened in September 2009 and the first match that took place at the stadium was contested between Mochudi Centre Chiefs of Botswana and Platinum Stars F.C. of South Africa.

The first Premier Soccer League game that took place at the stadium was between Platinum Stars, who use the stadium as a home venue, and Ajax Cape Town.

It was used by the New Zealand national football team as a training venue during the 2009 FIFA Confederations Cup.

The England national football team played Platinum Stars as a warm-up game before the 2010 FIFA World Cup on 7 June, with England running out 3–0 victors.
