= Saulspoort =

- Location within North West (South African province) Location within South Africa
- Coordinates: 25°09′19″S 27°10′17″E
- Country: South Africa
- Province: North West
- District: Bojanala
- Municipality: Moses Kotane

Area
  - Total: 14.76 km^{2} (5.70 sq mi)

Population (2011)
  - Total: 11,220
  - Density: 760.2/km^{2} (1,969/sq mi)

Racial makeup (2011)
  - Black African: 99.5%
  - Coloured: 0.1%
  - Indian/Asian: 0.1%
  - Other: 0.3%

First languages (2011)
  - Tswana: 86.4%
  - English: 3.3%
  - Zulu: 2.1%
  - S. Ndebele: 1.5%
  - Other: 6.8%
- Time zone: UTC+2 (SAST)
- Postal code (street): 0318
- PO box: 0318

Saulspoort (also known as Moruleng) is a village in South Africa, at the northern foot of the Pilanesberg, about 65 km north of Rustenburg. It was named after a former baKgatla chief, Tsheole, called Saul by the early settlers.

It was established when Henri Gonin, a Swiss missionary with the Dutch Reformed Church preaching to the baKgatla tribe, moved to Saulspoort farm, which was owned by the later president Paul Kruger; Kruger eventually sold the farm to Gonin in 1869. In 1895 the baKgatla purchased most of Saulspoort from Gonin.
