= 2016 COSAFA Cup =

Tournament details
- Host country: Namibia
- City: Windhoek
- Dates: 11–25 June 2016
- Teams: 14 (from 2 sub-confederations)
- Venue(s): 2 (in 1 host city)

Final positions
- Champions: South Africa (4th title)
- Runners-up: Botswana
- Third place: Swaziland
- Fourth place: DR Congo

Tournament statistics
- Matches played: 23
- Goals scored: 53 (2.3 per match)
- Top scorer(s): (Eswatini) Felix Badenhorst (5 goals)

The 2016 COSAFA Cup (known as Castle Lager COSAFA Cup Namibia 2016 for sponsorship reasons) was the 16th edition of the COSAFA Cup, an international football competition consisting of national teams of member nations of the Council of Southern Africa Football Associations (COSAFA). Originally, it was to be held in Windhoek, Namibia during May 2016, however the tournament was rescheduled to avoid a clash with the South African Premier Soccer League and took place in June 2016.

== Participating nations ==
National team	FIFA Ranking (April 2016)	Entry round
Mauritius	154	Group stage
Seychelles	178	Group stage
Swaziland	134	Group stage
Madagascar	138	Group stage
Zimbabwe	127	Group stage
Angola (U-23)	121	Group stage
Lesotho	148	Group stage
DR Congo (invitee)	51	Quarter final
Botswana	91	Quarter final
Malawi	107	Group stage
Mozambique	101	Quarter final
Zambia	78	Quarter final
Namibia	136	Quarter final
South Africa	70	Quarter final
Comoros	Did not enter	

== Venues ==
Windhoek
Sam Nujoma Stadium	Independence Stadium
Capacity: 10,300	Capacity: 25,000
22.515966°S 17.060781°E	22.607632°S 17.090896°E

== Draw ==
The draw was originally scheduled to place on 25 April 2016. It was rescheduled for 28 April 2016 and televised on SuperSport's Soccer Africa show.

== Group stage ==
=== Group A ===
Pos	Team	Pld	W	D	L	GF	GA	GD	Pts	Qualification
1	Swaziland	3	2	1	0	7	2	+5	7	Qualification to Quarter-finals
2	Zimbabwe	3	1	2	0	7	2	+5	5	
3	Madagascar	3	1	1	1	1	1	0	4	
4	Seychelles	3	0	0	3	0	10	−10	0	

Updated to match(es) played on 15 June 2016. Source:
11 June 2016
15:00

Zimbabwe	2–2	Swaziland
Tarumbwa 56'; Pfumbidzai 79'	Report (COSAFA)	Badenhorst 16', 65' (pen.)

Sam Nujoma Stadium, Windhoek
Referee: Janny Sikazwe (Zambia)
11 June 2016
17:30

Seychelles	0–1	Madagascar
	Report (COSAFA)	Fanomezana 21'

Sam Nujoma Stadium, Windhoek
Referee: Joshua Bondo (Botswana)

13 June 2016
17:00

Swaziland	4–0	Seychelles
Badenhorst 14', 34'; Ndlovu 68'; Nhleko 90'	Report (COSAFA)

Sam Nujoma Stadium, Windhoek
Referee: Victor Gomes (South Africa)
13 June 2016
19:30

Madagascar	0–0	Zimbabwe
	Report (COSAFA)

Sam Nujoma Stadium, Windhoek
Referee: Jackson Pavaza (Namibia)

15 June 2016
17:00

Zimbabwe	5–0	Seychelles
Pfumbidzai 23' (pen.); Mudehwe 37'; Mhlanga 64', 90+3'; Hadebe 73'	Report (COSAFA)

Sam Nujoma Stadium, Windhoek
Referee: Helder de Carvalho (Angola)
15 June 2016
17:00

Swaziland	1–0	Madagascar
Badenhorst 71'	Report (COSAFA)

Independence Stadium, Windhoek
Referee: Victor Gomes (South Africa)

=== Group B ===
Pos	Team	Pld	W	D	L	GF	GA	GD	Pts	Qualification
1	Lesotho	3	3	0	0	6	0	+6	9	Qualification to Quarter-finals
2	Malawi	3	2	0	1	4	1	+3	6	
3	Mauritius	3	1	0	2	2	4	−2	3	
4	Angola	3	0	0	3	0	7	−7	0	

Updated to match(es) played on 16 June 2016. Source:
12 June 2016
15:00

Lesotho	3–0	Mauritius
Thaba-Ntso 1'; Kamela 45+2'; Motebang 90'	Report (COSAFA)

Independence Stadium, Windhoek
Referee: Hamada Nampiandraza (Madagascar)
12 June 2016
17:30

Malawi	3–0	Angola
Mhango 32', 72', 90' (pen.)	Report (COSAFA)

Independence Stadium, Windhoek
Referee: Bernard Camille (Seychelles)

14 June 2016
17:00

Angola	0–2	Lesotho
	Report (COSAFA)	Khutlang 11'; Kalake 80' (pen.)

Independence Stadium, Windhoek
Referee: Norman Matemera (Zimbabwe)
14 June 2016
19:30

Mauritius	0–1	Malawi
	Report (COSAFA)	Gabeya 47'

Independence Stadium, Windhoek
Referee: Simanga Nhleko (Swaziland)

16 June 2016
17:00

Angola	0–2	Mauritius
	Report (COSAFA)	Dorza 1'; Sophie 24'

Independence Stadium, Windhoek
Referee: Jackson Pavaza (Namibia)
16 June 2016
17:00

Malawi	0–1	Lesotho
	Report (COSAFA)	Thaba-Ntso 83'

Sam Nujoma Stadium, Windhoek
Referee: Hamada Nampiandraza (Madagascar)

== Knockout stage ==
The two group stage winners qualified for this round.

=== Quarter-finals ===
18 June 2016
15:00

South Africa	1–1	Lesotho
Motupa 66'	Report (COSAFA)	Thaba-Ntso 19'
Penalties
Coetzee (penalty missed); Mobara (penalty scored); Masuku (penalty scored); Modiba (penalty scored); Mekoa (penalty scored)	4–2	(penalty scored) Kamela; (penalty scored) Kalake; (penalty missed) Makepe; (penalty missed) Khutlang

Sam Nujoma Stadium, Windhoek
Referee: Joshua Bondo (Botswana)
18 June 2016
17:30

Namibia	1–1	Botswana
Somaeb 83' (pen.)	Report (COSAFA)	Da Costa 50' (o.g.)
Penalties
Ketjijere (penalty scored); Da Costa (penalty scored); Somaeb (penalty scored); Keimuine (penalty scored); Hotto (penalty missed)	4–5	(penalty scored) Mafoko; (penalty scored) Sesinyi; (penalty scored) Gaolaolwe; (penalty scored) Sosome; (penalty scored) Mogorosi

Sam Nujoma Stadium, Windhoek
Referee: Janny Sikazwe (Zambia)

19 June 2016
15:00

Zambia	0–0	Swaziland
	Report (COSAFA)
Penalties
Mfune (penalty scored); Katema (penalty missed); Sautu (penalty missed); Daka (penalty scored)	2–4	(penalty missed) Nxumalo; (penalty scored) Tsabedze; (penalty scored) Nhleko; (penalty scored) Badenhorst; (penalty scored) Ginindza

Sam Nujoma Stadium, Windhoek
Referee: Hamada Nampiandraza (Madagascar)
19 June 2016
17:30

DR Congo	1–0	Mozambique
Omba 37'	Report (COSAFA)

Sam Nujoma Stadium, Windhoek
Referee: Victor Gomes (South Africa)

=== Semi-finals ===
22 June 2016
17:00

South Africa	5–1	Swaziland
Kutumela 52'; Phiri 57'; Masuku 60', 83'; Moseamedi 75'	Report (COSAFA)	Tsabedze 38'

Sam Nujoma Stadium, Windhoek
Referee: Bernard Camille (Seychelles)

22 June 2016
19:30

Botswana	0–0	DR Congo
	Report (COSAFA)
Penalties
Mafoko (penalty scored); Gaolaolwe (penalty scored); Kebue (penalty scored); Sosome (penalty scored); Mogorosi (penalty scored)	5–4	(penalty scored) Mabidi; (penalty scored) Botuli; (penalty missed) Basisila; (penalty scored) Ngulubi; (penalty scored) Baometo

Sam Nujoma Stadium, Windhoek
Referee: Helder de Carvalho (Angola)

=== Third place play-off ===
25 June 2016
15:00

Swaziland	1–0	DR Congo
Ndzinisa 41'	Report (COSAFA)

Sam Nujoma Stadium, Windhoek
Referee: Joshua Bondo (Botswana)

=== Final ===
25 June 2016
17:30

South Africa	3–2	Botswana
Motupa 33' (pen.), 88' (pen.); Kutumela 66'	Report (COSAFA)	Makgantai 16'; Seakanyeng 70'

Sam Nujoma Stadium, Windhoek
Referee: Janny Sikazwe (Zambia)

== Plate ==
The losing quarter-finalists qualified for this round.

=== Semi-finals ===
21 June 2016
17:00

Lesotho	2–3	Zambia
Tšosane 45+3'; Makepe 54'	Report (COSAFA)	Katema 14'; Sautu 56'; Zulu 63'

Sam Nujoma Stadium, Windhoek
Referee: Norman Matemera (Zimbabwe)

21 June 2016
19:30

Namibia	3–0	Mozambique
Keimuine 50'; Hotto 73'; Somaeb 85'	Report (COSAFA)

Sam Nujoma Stadium, Windhoek
Referee: Simanga Nhleko (Swaziland)

=== Final ===
24 June 2016
17:00

Zambia	0–1	Namibia
	Report (COSAFA)	Ketjijere 21' (pen.)

Sam Nujoma Stadium, Windhoek
Referee: Victor Gomes (South Africa)

== Goalscorers ==
5 goals

- (Eswatini) Felix Badenhorst

3 goals

- (Lesotho) Jane Thaba-Ntšo
- (Malawi) Gabadinho Mhango

2 goals

- (Namibia) Hendrik Somaeb
- (South Africa) Thabiso Kutumela
- (South Africa) Menzi Masuku
- (South Africa) Gift Motupa
- (Zimbabwe) Lawrence Mhlanga
- (Zimbabwe) Ronald Pfumbidzai

1 goal

- (Botswana) Onkabetse Makgantai
- (Botswana) Kabelo Seakanyeng
- (Democratic Republic of the Congo) Nelson Omba
- (Lesotho) Hlompho Kalake
- (Lesotho) Jeremea Kamela
- (Lesotho) Tumelo Khutlang
- (Lesotho) Basias Makepe
- (Lesotho) Sera Motebang
- (Lesotho) Phafa Tšosane
- (Madagascar) Tojo Claudel Fanomezana
- (Mauritius) Luis Dorza
- (Mauritius) Andy Sophie
- (Malawi) Miracle Gabeya
- (Namibia) Deon Hotto
- (Namibia) Itamunua Keimuine
- (Namibia) Ronald Ketjijere
- (South Africa) Judas Moseamedi
- (South Africa) Gift Motupa
- (South Africa) Lebogang Phiri
- (Eswatini) Njabulo Ndlovu
- (Eswatini) Wonder Nhleko
- (Eswatini) Sabelo Ndzinisa
- (Eswatini) Tony Tsabedze
- (Zambia) Paul Katema
- (Zambia) Spencer Sautu
- (Zambia) Charles Zulu
- (Zimbabwe) Teenage Hadebe
- (Zimbabwe) Marshal Mudehwe
- (Zimbabwe) Obadiah Tarumbwa

1 own goal

- (Namibia) Angula da Costa (playing against Botswana)
