= Itamunua Keimuine =

Namibian footballer

Personal information
- Full name: Itamunua Maverinjono Keimuine
- Date of birth: 1 May 1993 (age 33)
- Place of birth: Windhoek, Namibia
- Height: 1.69 m (5 ft 7 in)
- Position: Midfielder

Team information
- Current team: Dire Dawa City

Senior career*
Years	Team	Apps	(Gls)
2012–2018	Tura Magic		
2018–	Dire Dawa City		

International career^{‡}
2012–13	Namibia U20		
2014–	Namibia	29	(1)
- * Club domestic league appearances and goals ‡ National team caps and goals as of 16:30, 23 June 2019 (UTC)

Itamunua Maverinjono Keimuine (born 1 May 1993) is a Namibian footballer who currently plays as a midfielder for Dire Dawa City in the Ethiopian Premier League and for the Namibia national football team.

== Club career ==
Keimuine started his career at Tura Magic, and in 2012–13 season helped them in an important relegation battle by scoring in a 3–1 win against Mighty Gunners. He helped Magic to a strong third-place finish in the 2013–14 and 2015–16 seasons.

On 30 September 2018, he joined Ethiopian side Dire Dawa City, thus becoming the first Namibian player to play in Ethiopia.

== International career ==
Keimuine was called up for the Namibia U20's for the 2013 African U-20 Championship qualification, but were knocked out in the preliminary round, after losing 4–1 on aggregate to Rwanda. He subsequently became a regular in the squad and played in the FESA Cup in Angola.

On 1 September 2014, Keimuine got his first national callup after he was named in Namibia's 23-man squad by coach Ricardo Mannetti, for a friendly against Swaziland. The game ended in a 1–1 draw. In May 2015, Keimuine was part of the Namibian squad which won the 2015 COSAFA Cup. On 21 June 2016, he scored his first ever international goal in a 3–0 win against Mozambique in the 2016 COSAFA Cup. On 3 January 2019, he was named in Namibia's 23-man squad for the 2018 CHAN finals in Morocco. Namibia defeated Ivory Coast, Uganda and drew against Zambia to finish second in the group behind Zambia, and qualified for the next round. They were knocked out of the tournament in the quarter-finals by hosts and eventual champions Morocco.

On 23 May 2019, Keimuine was named in Namibia's 23-man squad for the 2019 Africa Cup of Nations in Egypt. In Namibia's opening match against Morocco, he finished Hakim Ziyech’s well-placed cross past his own goalkeeper just 10 minutes after coming on, thus scoring an own goal.

=== Stats ===
As of 23 June 2019

National team	Year	Apps	Goals
Namibia	2014	1	0
Namibia	2015	8	0
Namibia	2016	4	1
Namibia	2017	7	0
Namibia	2018	8	0
Namibia	2019	1	0
Total		29	1

=== International goals ===
Scores and results list Namibia's goal tally first.

No.	Date	Venue	Opponent	Score	Result	Competition
1.	21 June 2016	Sam Nujoma Stadium, Windhoek, Namibia	Mozambique	1–0	3–0	2016 COSAFA Cup

== Honours ==
=== National team ===
- COSAFA Cup (1): 2015
