= 2015 U-23 Africa Cup of Nations =

2015 Coupe d'Afrique des nations U-23

Tournament details
- Host country: Senegal
- Dates: 28 November – 12 December
- Teams: 8 (from 1 confederation)
- Venue: 2 (in 2 host cities)

Final positions
- Champions: Nigeria (1st title)
- Runners-up: Algeria
- Third place: South Africa
- Fourth place: Senegal

Tournament statistics
- Matches played: 16
- Goals scored: 36 (2.25 per match)
- Top scorer: (Nigeria) Etebo Oghenekaro (5 goals)
- Best player: (Nigeria) Azubuike Okechukwu
- Best goalkeeper: (Algeria) Abdelkader Salhi
- Fair play award: South Africa

The 2015 U-23 Africa Cup of Nations was the 2nd edition of the U-23 Africa Cup of Nations, the quadrennial international age-restricted football championship organised by the Confederation of African Football (CAF) for the men's under-23 national teams of Africa. The tournament started on 28 November and finished on 12 December 2015. A total of eight teams are playing in the tournament.

The tournament was initially scheduled to take place in the Democratic Republic of the Congo between 5–19 December 2015. However, CAF changed the hosts and requested Senegal to host the tournament instead, and the tournament dates were also changed.

On 6 August 2015, the CAF Executive Committee decided to change the name of the tournament from the CAF U-23 Championship to the Africa U-23 Cup of Nations, similar to the senior's version, 2015 Africa Cup of Nations.

Same as the previous edition, the tournament acted as the CAF qualifiers for the Olympic football tournament. The top three teams of the tournament qualified for the 2016 Summer Olympics men's football tournament in Brazil as the CAF representatives.

Nigeria won the tournament with a 1–0 final win over Algeria. Both finalists and third-placed South Africa qualified for the Olympics.

== Qualification ==
Senegal qualified automatically as hosts, while the remaining seven spots were determined by the qualifying rounds, which took place from April to August 2015.

=== Qualified teams ===
The following eight teams qualified for the final tournament. Defending champions Gabon failed to qualify after they lost to Mali.

Team	Appearance	Previous best performance
Algeria	2nd	Group stage (2011)
Egypt	2nd	Third place (2011)
Mali	1st	Debut
Nigeria	2nd	Group stage (2011)
Senegal (hosts)	2nd	Fourth place (2011)
South Africa	2nd	Group stage (2011)
Tunisia	1st	Debut
Zambia	1st	Debut

== Venues ==
The tournament was held in two venues.

Dakar	Locations of the 2015 U-23 Afcon venues	M'Bour
Stade Léopold Sédar Senghor	Locations of the 2015 U-23 Afcon venues	Stade Caroline Faye
Capacity: 60,000	Locations of the 2015 U-23 Afcon venues	Capacity: 5,000

== Squads ==
Players born on or after 1 January 1993 were eligible to compete in the tournament. Each squad could contain a maximum of 21 players.

== Match officials ==
A total of 10 referees and 13 assistant referees were selected.

Referees

- Redouane Jiyed (Morocco)
- Juste Ephrem Zio (Burkina Faso)
- Joshua Bondo (Botswana)
- Mehdi Abid Charef (Algeria)
- Hudu Munyemana (Rwanda)
- Antoine Effa (Cameroon)
- Hamada Nampiandra (Madagascar)
- Bienvenu Sinko (Ivory Coast)
- Malang Diedhiou (Senegal)
- Youssef Essrayri (Tunisia)

Assistant referees

- Jerson dos Santos (Angola)
- Arsenio Marengula (Mozambique)
- Eldrick Adelaide (Seychelles)
- Drissa Kamory Niare (Mali)
- Berhe O. Michael (Eritrea)
- Yahaya Mahamadou (Niger)
- Mark Sonko (Uganda)
- Samba Malik (Senegal)
- Elmoiz Ali Mohamed Ahmed (Sudan)
- Mahmoud Ahmed Abo el Regal (Egypt)
- Issa Yaya (Chad)
- Oliver Safari (DR Congo)
- Sidiki Sidibe (Guinea)

== Group stage ==
The draw for the final tournament of the competition took place on 14 September 2015, 11:00 UTC+2, at the CAF headquarters in Cairo. The eight teams were drawn into two groups of four. For the draw, the hosts Senegal were seeded in position A1 and the previous tournament's best-placed qualified team Egypt were seeded in position B1. The remaining six teams were drawn from one pot to fill the other positions in the two groups.

The top two teams of each group advanced to the semi-finals.

Tiebreakers

The teams were ranked according to points (3 points for a win, 1 point for a draw, 0 points for a loss). If tied on points, tiebreakers would be applied in the following order:

1. Number of points obtained in games between the teams concerned;
2. Goal difference in games between the teams concerned;
3. Goals scored in games between the teams concerned;
4. If, after applying criteria 1 to 3 to several teams, two teams still have an equal ranking, criteria 1 to 3 are reapplied exclusively to the matches between the two teams in question to determine their final rankings. If this procedure does not lead to a decision, criteria 5 to 7 apply;
5. Goal difference in all games;
6. Goals scored in all games;
7. Drawing of lots.

All times were local, GMT (UTC±0).

=== Group A ===
Pos	Team	Pld	W	D	L	GF	GA	GD	Pts	Qualification
1	Senegal (H)	3	3	0	0	6	1	+5	9	Knockout stage
2	South Africa	3	2	0	1	5	5	0	6	Knockout stage
3	Tunisia	3	1	0	2	2	4	−2	3	
4	Zambia	3	0	0	3	3	6	−3	0	

Source: CAF
Rules for classification: Group stage tiebreakers
(H) Hosts
28 November 2015
15:00

Senegal	3–1	South Africa
Keita 15' (pen.), 20'; S. Sarr 87'	Report	Ntshangase 27' (pen.)

Stade Léopold Sédar Senghor, Dakar
Referee: Rédouane Jiyed (Morocco)
28 November 2015
18:00

Zambia	1–2	Tunisia
Kampamba 15'	Report	Jouini 3', 83'

Stade Léopold Sédar Senghor, Dakar
Referee: Juste Ephrem Zio (Burkina Faso)

1 December 2015
15:00

South Africa	3–2	Zambia
Masuku 46'; Motupa 51', 58'	Report	Luchanga 34'; Katema 72'

Stade Léopold Sédar Senghor, Dakar
Referee: Mehdi Abid Charef (Algeria)
1 December 2015
18:00

Tunisia	0–2	Senegal
	Report	Diédhiou 8'; Diallo 84'

Stade Léopold Sédar Senghor, Dakar
Referee: Bienvenu Sinko (Ivory Coast)

4 December 2015
17:00

Senegal	1–0	Zambia
Diallo 3'	Report

Stade Léopold Sédar Senghor, Dakar
Referee: Joshua Bondo (Botswana)
4 December 2015
17:00

South Africa	1–0	Tunisia
Masuku 85'	Report

Stade Caroline Faye, M'Bour
Referee: Hamada Nampiandraza (Madagascar)

=== Group B ===
Pos	Team	Pld	W	D	L	GF	GA	GD	Pts	Qualification
1	Algeria	3	1	2	0	3	1	+2	5	Knockout stage
2	Nigeria	3	1	2	0	5	4	+1	5	Knockout stage
3	Mali	3	1	0	2	3	5	−2	3	
4	Egypt	3	0	2	1	3	4	−1	2	

Source: CAF
Rules for classification: Group stage tiebreakers
29 November 2015
15:00

Egypt	1–1	Algeria
Kahraba 54'	Report	Chita 68'

Stade Caroline Faye, M'Bour
Referee: Malang Diedhiou (Senegal)
29 November 2015
18:00

Mali	2–3	Nigeria
Niane 55' (pen.); A. Diarra 64'	Report	Ajayi 15', 45'; Usman 33'

Stade Caroline Faye, M'Bour
Referee: Hamada Nampiandra (Madagascar)

2 December 2015
15:00

Algeria	2–0	Mali
Ferhat 72'; Y. Traoré 83' (o.g.)	Report

Stade Caroline Faye, M'Bour
Referee: Joshua Bondo (Botswana)
2 December 2015
18:00

Nigeria	2–2	Egypt
Oghenekaro 20' (pen.), 30' (pen.)	Report	Sobhi 47'; Elsayed 51'

Stade Caroline Faye, M'Bour
Referee: Antoine Effa (Cameroon)

5 December 2015
17:00

Egypt	0–1	Mali
	Report	Coulibaly 18'

Stade Caroline Faye, M'Bour
Referee: Hudu Munyemana (Rwanda)
5 December 2015
17:00

Algeria	0–0	Nigeria
	Report

Stade Léopold Sédar Senghor, Dakar
Referee: Malang Diedhiou (Senegal)

== Knockout stage ==
In the knockout stage, if a match was level at the end of normal playing time, extra time would be played (two periods of 15 minutes each) and followed, if necessary, by kicks from the penalty mark to determine the winner, except for the third place match where no extra time would be played.

=== Bracket ===
Semi-finals
9 December – Dakar
Senegal	0
Nigeria	1
9 December – Dakar
Algeria	2
South Africa	0

Final
12 December – Dakar
Nigeria	2
Algeria	1
Third place
12 December – Dakar
Senegal	0 (1)
South Africa (p)	0 (3)

=== Semi-finals ===
Winners qualified for 2016 Summer Olympics.

9 December 2015
15:00

Senegal	0–1	Nigeria
	Report	Oghenekaro 76' (pen.)

Stade Léopold Sédar Senghor, Dakar
Referee: Redouane Jiyed (Morocco)

9 December 2015
18:30

Algeria	2–0	South Africa
Darfalou 8'; Benkhemassa 49'	Report

Stade Léopold Sédar Senghor, Dakar
Referee: Juste Ephrem Zio (Burkina Faso)

=== Third place play-off ===
Winner qualified for 2016 Summer Olympics.

12 December 2015
16:00

Senegal	0–0	South Africa
	Report
Penalties
Badji (penalty missed); Diaw (penalty missed); I. Sarr (penalty scored); S. Sarr (penalty missed)	1–3	(penalty scored) Motupa; (penalty missed) Mngonyama; (penalty scored) Masuku; (penalty missed) Dolly; (penalty scored) Mahlambi

Stade Léopold Sédar Senghor, Dakar
Referee: Hudu Munyemana (Rwanda)

=== Final ===
12 December 2015
19:00

Nigeria	2–1	Algeria
Oghenekaro 14' (pen.), 40'	Report	Tope 30' (o.g.)

Stade Léopold Sédar Senghor, Dakar
Referee: Hamada Nampiandra (Madagascar)

== Winners ==
2015 Africa U-23 Cup of Nations champions

Nigeria
First title

== Final ranking ==
As per statistical convention in football, matches decided in extra time are counted as wins and losses, while matches decided by penalty shoot-outs are counted as draws.

Pos	Team	Pld	W	D	L	GF	GA	GD	Pts	Final result
1st place, gold medalist(s)	Nigeria	5	3	2	0	8	5	+3	11	Champions
2nd place, silver medalist(s)	Algeria	5	2	2	1	6	3	+3	8	Runners-up
3rd place, bronze medalist(s)	South Africa	5	2	1	2	5	7	−2	7	Third place
4	Senegal (H)	5	3	1	1	6	2	+4	10	Fourth place
5	Mali	3	1	0	2	3	5	−2	3	Eliminated in Group stage
6	Tunisia	3	1	0	2	2	4	−2	3	Eliminated in Group stage
7	Egypt	3	0	2	1	3	4	−1	2	Eliminated in Group stage
8	Zambia	3	0	0	3	3	6	−3	0	Eliminated in Group stage

Source: CAF
(H) Hosts

=== Qualified teams for Olympics ===
The following three teams from CAF qualified for the Olympic football tournament.

Team	Qualified on	Previous appearances in tournament^{1}
Nigeria	9 December 2015	6 (1968, 1980, 1988, **1996**, 2000, 2008)
Algeria	9 December 2015	1 (1980)
South Africa	12 December 2015	1 (2000)

^{1} Bold indicates champion for that year. Italic indicates host for that year. Statistics include all Olympic format (current Olympic under-23 format started in 1992).

== Awards ==
The following awards were given at the conclusion of the tournament:

- Most Valuable Player: (Nigeria) Azubuike Okechukwu
- Top Scorer: (Nigeria) Etebo Oghenekaro – 5 goals
- Best Goalkeeper: (Algeria) Abdelkader Salhi
- Fair Play: South Africa

== Goalscorers ==
5 goals

- (Nigeria) Etebo Oghenekaro

2 goals

- (Algeria) Zinedine Ferhat
- (Nigeria) Junior Ajayi
- (Senegal) Mouhamadou Diallo
- (Senegal) Ibrahima Keita
- (South Africa) Menzi Masuku
- (South Africa) Gift Motupa
- (Tunisia) Haythem Jouini

1 goal

- (Algeria) Mohamed Benkhemassa
- (Algeria) Oussama Chita
- (Algeria) Oussama Darfalou
- (Egypt) Mamdouh Elsayed
- (Egypt) Kahraba
- (Egypt) Ramadan Sobhi
- (Mali) Souleymane Coulibaly
- (Mali) Abdoulaye Diarra
- (Mali) Adama Niane
- (Nigeria) Mohammed Usman
- (Senegal) Ibrahima Diédhiou
- (Senegal) Sidy Sarr
- (South Africa) Phumlani Ntshangase
- (Zambia) Ronald Kampamba
- (Zambia) Paul Katema
- (Zambia) Conlyde Luchanga

1 own goal

- (Mali) Youssouf Traoré (playing against Algeria)
- (Nigeria) Oduduwa Segun Tope (playing against Algeria)
