= François Kamano =

Guinean footballer (born 1996)

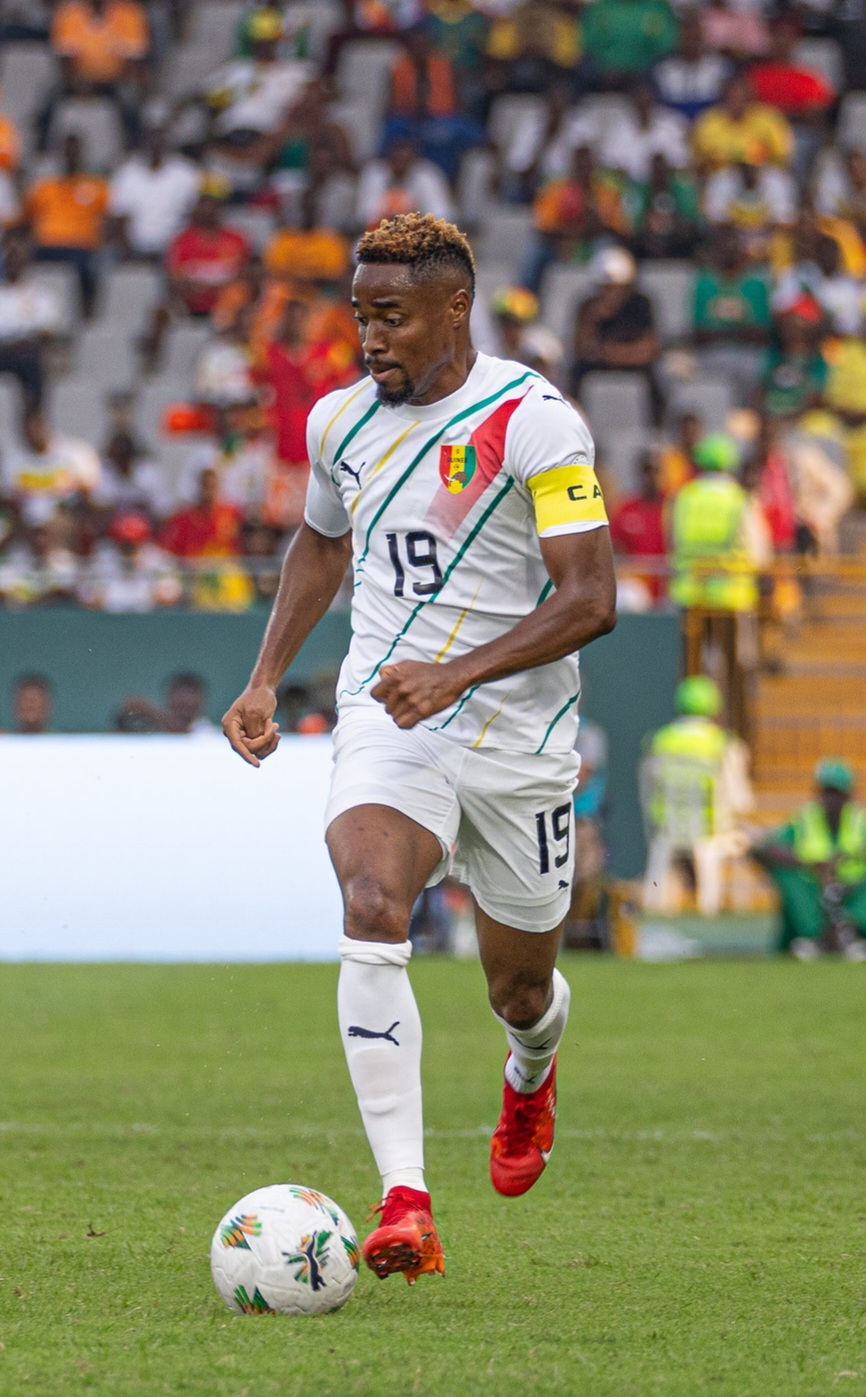
- Kamano with Guinea in 2024

Personal information
- Full name: François Kamano
- Date of birth: 2 May 1996 (age 30)
- Place of birth: Conakry, Guinea
- Height: 1.75 m (5 ft 9 in)
- Positions: Left winger; striker

Team information
- Current team: IMT
- Number: 40

Youth career
- 2010–2013: Satellite FC
- 2013–2014: Bastia

Senior career*
Years	Team	Apps	(Gls)
2014–2016	Bastia	47	(7)
2014	Bastia II	3	(1)
2016–2020	Bordeaux	113	(25)
2020–2023	Lokomotiv Moscow	69	(10)
2023–2025	Abha	32	(2)
2024–2025	→ Damac (loan)	30	(4)
2025–2026	Sochi	15	(2)
2026–	IMT	7	(2)

International career^{‡}
2015–	Guinea	56	(8)
- * Club domestic league appearances and goals as of 22 November 2026 ‡ National team caps and goals as of 21 March 2025

François Kamano (born 2 May 1996) is a Guinean professional footballer who plays as a striker or left winger for Serbian SuperLiga club IMT.

== Club career ==
=== Bastia ===
Kamano made his professional debut with Bastia on 9 August 2014 in a 3–3 home draw against Marseille, replacing Christopher Maboulou for the last 8 minutes. His first goal came on 20 December, putting Bastia ahead in an eventual 1–1 draw at Caen. He finished his first season with four goals in 24 games, and was sent off on 9 May 2015, in the first half of a 1–0 win at Rennes.

At the start of the following season, Kamano received two straight red cards in losses at Saint-Étienne and Lyon. He scored three goals, all in home and away 2–1 wins over Rennes; his brace at Roazhon Park in the final game on 14 May 2016, he ensured the 10th place for the Corsicans.

=== Bordeaux ===
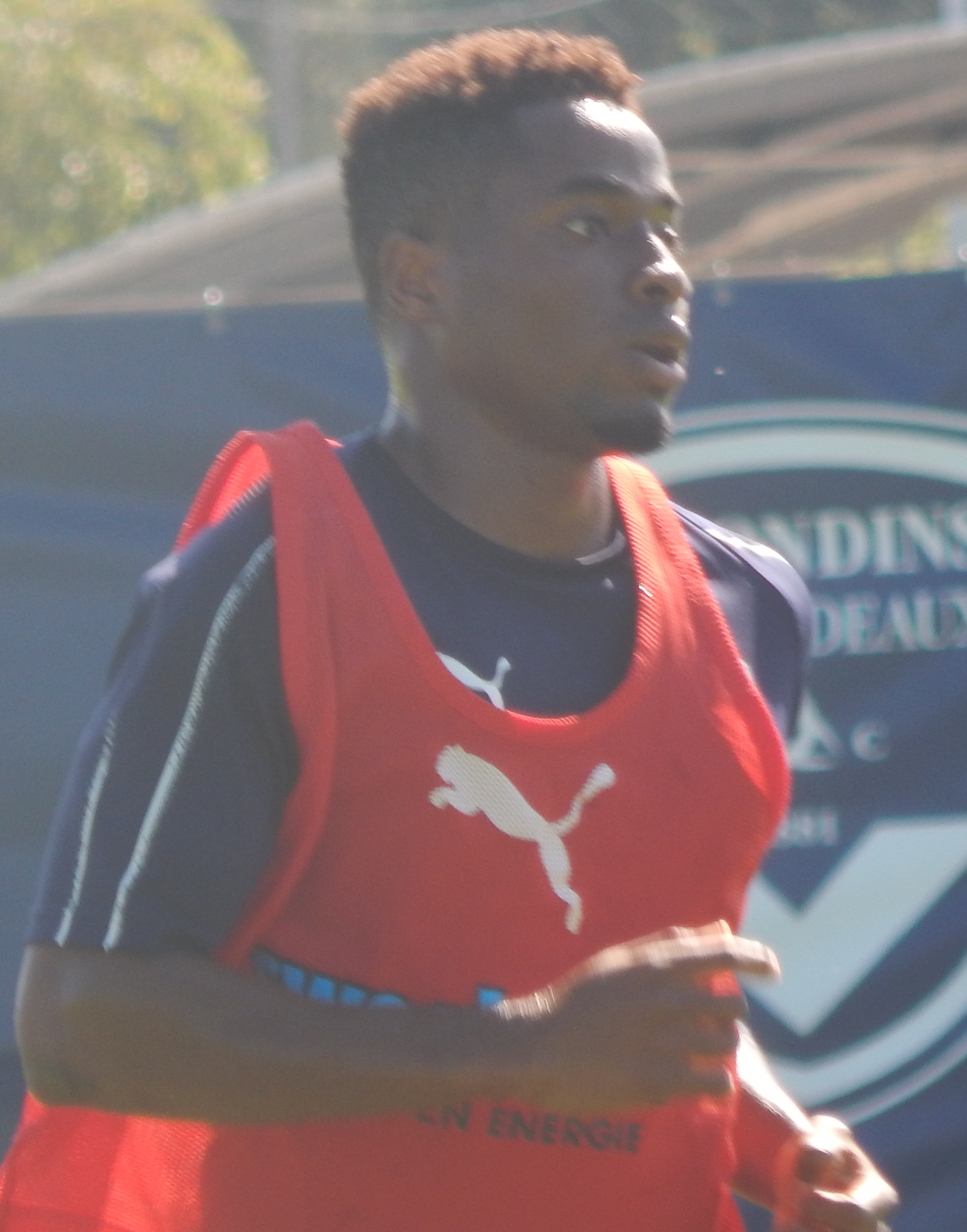
Kamano with Bordeaux in 2018

In July 2016, Kamano signed a four-year contract with Bordeaux, after previous trials with AIK, Villarreal, and Rennes and interest from Guingamp. The reported transfer was €2.5 million plus bonuses. On 26 October 2016, he made his Bordeaux debut in a 2–0 Coupe de la Ligue win against Championnat National side Châteauroux, also scoring his debut goal in the same game. On 30 October 2016, he made his league debut in a 0–0 away draw against Olympique Marseille. On 6 November 2016, he scored his first league goal for Bordeaux in a 2–1 home win against Lorient. Later that month, on 27 November 2016, he scored his first brace for Bordeaux in a 3–2 home win against Dijon, his first, a header in the 88th minute from a corner from Jaroslav Plašil and his second, a tap-in in the third minute of added time from a deflection off Jérémy Ménez's shot. In his debut season, Kamano got 17 starts in 30 games selected, providing four assists and netting in six goals. Playing largely on the left-hand side, he helped Bordeaux finish 6th in the league and qualify for next season's UEFA Europa League.

Kamano made his Europa League debut on 27 July 2017, playing full 90 minutes in both the legs of the third qualifying round match against Videoton. Bordeaux won the first leg 2–1 but bowed out of the tournament in the second leg after losing on away goals. At the end of the 2017–18 Ligue 1 season, he helped Bordeaux to another 6th-place finish, scoring 8 goals in the process, and thus qualifying for another Europa League season. On 2 August 2018, he scored his debut goal in the Europa League in the 2nd leg of the second qualifying round match against Ventspils. On 20 September 2018, he made his Europa League group stage debut in a 1–0 away loss against Slavia Prague. On 8 November 2018, he scored his first goal in the Europa League group stage in a 1–1 home draw against Zenit Saint Petersburg. Bordeaux was not able to advance to the next round after finishing third in the group stage.

=== Lokomotiv Moscow ===
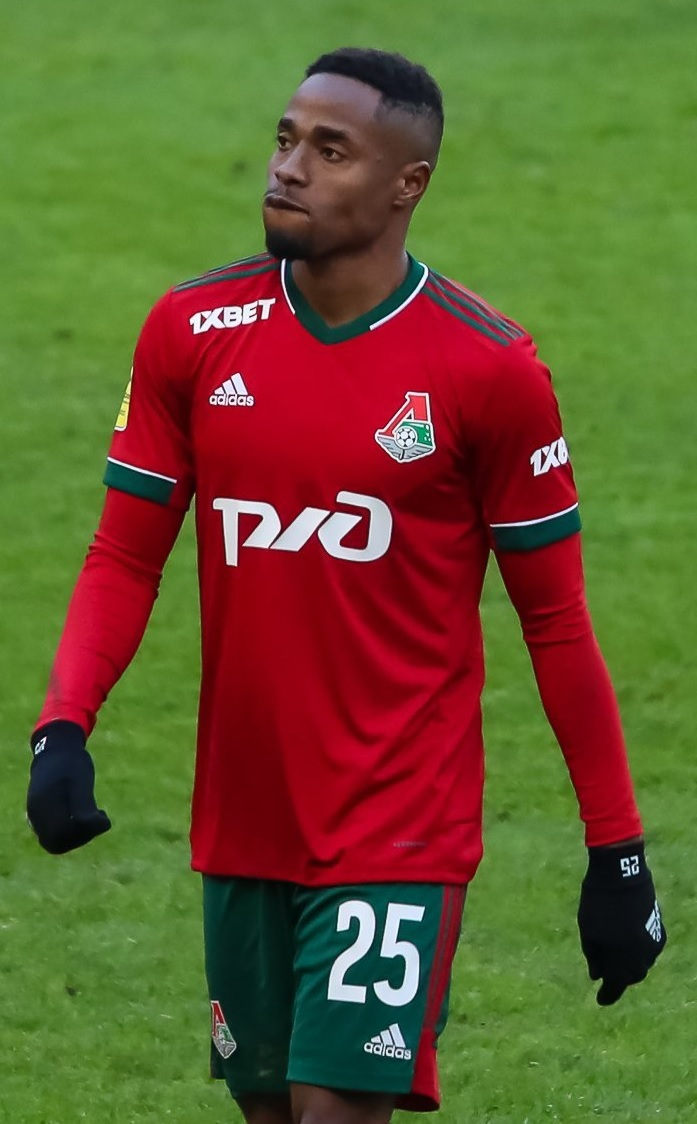
Kamano in action for Lokomotiv Moscow

On 17 August 2020, Kamano moved to Russian club Lokomotiv Moscow for a reported transfer fee of €5.5 million and signed a long-term contract. In his first season, he helped Lokomotiv to win the 2020–21 Russian Cup, he scored a goal in each of the four rounds the club played in, including the opening goal in a 3–1 final victory over Krylia Sovetov Samara on 12 May 2021. He also became a joint-top scorer of the cup with teammate Fyodor Smolov.

Kamano left Lokomotiv in June 2023.

=== Saudi Arabia ===
On 3 August 2023, Kamano joined Saudi Pro League club Abha on a two-year deal.

On 23 August 2024, Kamano joined Damac on a one-year deal.

=== Sochi ===
On 12 September 2025, Kamano signed a contract with Russian Premier League club Sochi for one year, with an optional second year.

== International career ==
On 6 July 2013, Kamano made his national team debut in a 3–1 2014 CHAN qualification defeat against Mali. On 30 December 2014, he was named in coach Michel Dussuyer's 23-man squad for the 2015 Africa Cup of Nations in Equatorial Guinea. He made two late substitute appearances for the quarter-finalists. On 12 June 2015, he scored his first ever senior international goal in a 2–1 defeat against Swaziland in the 2017 Africa Cup of Nations qualifiers.

On 13 June 2019, he was named in Guinea's 23-man squad for the 2019 Africa Cup of Nations in Egypt. On 22 June 2019, he scored in his sides 2–2 opening match draw against Madagascar. Kamano scored from the spot, after Ibrahima Traoré was fouled inside the box, he was later subbed out in the 78th minute for Fodé Koita.

== Career statistics ==
=== Club ===
As of match played 26 April 2026

Club	Season	League			Cup		League Cup		Europe		Other		Total	
Club	Season	Division	Apps	Goals	Apps	Goals	Apps	Goals	Apps	Goals	Apps	Goals	Apps	Goals
Bastia	2014–15	Ligue 1	24	4	0	0	2	0	—		—		26	4
Bastia	2015–16	Ligue 1	23	3	1	1	0	0	—		—		24	4
Bastia	Total		47	7	1	1	2	0	0	0	0	0	50	8
Bastia II	2014–15	Championnat National 3	3	1	—		—		—		—		3	1
Bordeaux	2016–17	Ligue 1	30	6	4	0	3	2	—		—		37	8
Bordeaux	2017–18	Ligue 1	35	8	1	0	1	0	2 (Note: Appearances in UEFA Europa League)	0	—		39	8
Bordeaux	2018–19	Ligue 1	37	10	1	0	2	0	11	3	—		51	13
Bordeaux	2019–20	Ligue 1	11	1	0	0	1	0	—		—		12	1
Bordeaux	Total		113	25	6	0	7	2	13	3	0	0	139	30
Lokomotiv Moscow	2020–21	Russian Premier League	25	5	4	4	—		4 (Note: Appearances in UEFA Champions League)	0	0	0	33	9
Lokomotiv Moscow	2021–22	Russian Premier League	16	2	0	0	—		4	1	1 (Note: Appearance in Russian Super Cup)	0	21	3
Lokomotiv Moscow	2022–23	Russian Premier League	28	3	9	3	—		—		—		37	6
Lokomotiv Moscow	Total		69	10	13	7	0	0	8	1	1	0	91	18
Abha	2023–24	Saudi Pro League	31	2	2	0	—		—		—		33	2
Abha	2024–25	Saudi First Division League	1	0	—		—		—		—		1	0
Abha	Total		32	2	2	0	0	0	0	0	0	0	34	2
Damac (loan)	2024–25	Saudi Pro League	30	4	1	0	—		—		—		31	4
Sochi	2025–26	Russian Premier League	15	2	2	0	—		—		—		17	2
Career total			309	51	25	8	9	2	21	4	1	0	365	65

=== International ===
As of match played 21 March 2025

National team	Year	Apps	Goals
Guinea	2013	2	0
Guinea	2014	0	0
Guinea	2015	5	1
Guinea	2016	6	0
Guinea	2017	7	3
Guinea	2018	5	1
Guinea	2019	9	1
Guinea	2020	2	0
Guinea	2021	3	1
Guinea	2022	0	0
Guinea	2023	8	1
Guinea	2024	10	0
Guinea	2025	1	0
Total		56	8

==== International goals ====
As of match played 24 March 2023. Guinea score listed first, score column indicates score after each Kamano goal.

International goals by date, venue, cap, opponent, score, result and competition
No.	Date	Venue	Cap	Opponent	Score	Result	Competition
1	12 June 2015	Stade Mohammed V, Casablanca, Morocco	7	Eswatini	1–1	1–2	2017 Africa Cup of Nations qualification
2	24 March 2017	Stade Océane, Le Havre, France	14	Gabon	1–0	2–2	Friendly
3	28 March 2017	Edmond Machtens Stadium, Brussels, Belgium	15	Cameroon	2–1	2–1	Friendly
4	10 June 2017	Stade Bouaké, Bouaké, Ivory Coast	17	Ivory Coast	2–2	3–2	2019 Africa Cup of Nations qualification
5	12 October 2018	Stade du 28 Septembre, Conakry, Guinea	23	Rwanda	1–0	2–0	2019 Africa Cup of Nations qualification
6	22 June 2019	Alexandria Stadium, Alexandria, Egypt	30	Madagascar	2–2	2–2	2019 Africa Cup of Nations
7	1 September 2021	Stade Olympique, Nouakchott, Mauritania	37	Guinea-Bissau	1–0	1–1	2022 FIFA World Cup qualification
8	24 March 2023	Stade Mohammed V, Casablanca, Morocco	40	Ethiopia	1–0	2–0	2023 Africa Cup of Nations qualification

== Honours ==
=== Club ===
Lokomotiv Moscow

- Russian Cup: 2020–21

=== Individual ===
- Russian Cup Top goalscorer: 2020–21
