= Obadiah Tarumbwa =

Zimbabwean footballer (born 1985)

Personal information
- Full name: Obadiah Danger Tarumbwa Moyo
- Date of birth: 25 November 1985 (age 40)
- Place of birth: Bulawayo, Zimbabwe
- Height: 1.93 m (6 ft 4 in)
- Position: Attacking midfielder

Team information
- Current team: University of Pretoria

Senior career*
Years	Team	Apps	(Gls)
2000–2008	Highlanders	84	(32)
2008–2009	Cercle Brugge	6	(0)
2009	Bantu Rovers	5	(2)
2009–2011	Enosis Neon Paralimni	46	(2)
2011–2012	APOP Kinyras	25	(5)
2012–2013	Ermis Aradippou	12	(3)
2013	Sofapaka	0	(0)
2013–2014	Tuks	9	(0)
2014–2015	Bantu Rovers		
2015–2016	→ Highlanders (loan)		
2016–	Chicken Inn		

International career^{‡}
2007–	Zimbabwe	5	(1)
- * Club domestic league appearances and goals as of 17 January 2017 ‡ National team caps and goals as of 17 January 2017

Obadiah Danger Tarumbwa (born 25 November 1985 in Bulawayo) is a Zimbabwean football player who plays for Chicken Inn in the Zimbabwe Premier Soccer League as an attacking midfielder.

== Career ==
In February 2008, he signed a 6-month deal with Belgian first division team Cercle Brugge. At Cercle he was reunited with his former Highlanders FC colleagues Vusumuzi Nyoni and Honour Gombami, by whom he was tipped to the Cercle board. He is a member of the Zimbabwe national football team.

His contract with Cercle Brugge was ended on 13 March 2009. He returned to his home country and signed for Bantu Rovers.

On 2 August 2012, Tarumbwa returned to his homeland having been tipped to join Dynamos of Zimbabwe, but turned down the move after failing to agree terms. He joined Cypriot Second Division club Ermis Aradippou and got the number 7 jersey.

On 29 December 2012, Tarumbwa landed in Kenya to sign a two-year contract with 2009 Kenyan Premier League champions Sofapaka. The deal was finalised on 2 January 2013.

He joined University of Pretoria F.C. during the June 2013 TPL mid-season break

== International goals ==
As of match played 11 June 2016. Zimbabwe score listed first, score column indicates score after each Tarumbwa goal.

International goals by date, venue, cap, opponent, score, result and competition
No.	Date	Venue	Cap	Opponent	Score	Result	Competition
1	11 June 2016	Sam Nujoma Stadium, Windhoek, Namibia	2	Swaziland	1–2	2–2	2016 COSAFA Cup
