= Hendrik Somaeb =

Namibian footballer

Personal information
- Full name: Hendrik Somaeb
- Date of birth: 29 September 1992 (age 34)
- Place of birth: Walvis Bay, Namibia
- Height: 1.78 m (5 ft 10 in)
- Position: Striker

Team information
- Current team: Blue Waters

Senior career*
Years	Team	Apps	(Gls)
2010–2014	Blue Waters		
2014–2016	Free State Stars	23	(3)
2016–2017	Jomo Cosmos	1	(0)
2017–2018	Blue Waters		
2018	Zemun	11	(2)
2019	Lusaka Dynamos	8	(1)
2020–	Blue Waters		

International career^{‡}
2011–2019	Namibia	30	(8)
- * Club domestic league appearances and goals as of 15 November 2024 ‡ National team caps and goals as of 25 November 2024

Hendrik Somaeb (born 29 September 1992) is a Namibian international footballer who plays for Blue Waters.

== Club career ==
Born in the Namibian coastal city of Walvis Bay in 1992 (then in South Africa), Somaeb started playing with local side Blue Waters which is one of the two local clubs that are standard in the Namibia Premier League. With the usual presence of South African scouts paying attention to any emerging Namibian talents, it was no surprise that Somaeb, by then established Namibian international, was signed by South African side Free State Stars where he played the following two seasons in the South African Premier Division. He later played with another South African club, Jomo Cosmos, in the 2016–17 National First Division, before returning to Namibia in 2017 joining his former club Blue Waters.

In summer 2018 he made his move to Europe and Serbian top-league side FK Zemun signed him on the last day of the 2018 summer transfer-window. He debuted for Zemun in the 2018–19 Serbian SuperLiga, on 1 September 2018, in a 7th round home victory against FK Rad by 1–0.

On 19 February 2019, he joined Zambian giants Lusaka Dynamos Football Club.

== International career ==
Somaeb has been a regular member of the Namibian national team since 2010.

=== International goals ===
Scores and results list Namibia's goal tally first.

No	Date	Venue	Opponent	Score	Result	Competition
1.	13 October 2015	Sam Nujoma Stadium, Windhoek, Namibia	Gambia	2–1	2–1	2018 FIFA World Cup qualification
2.	26 March 2016	Prince Louis Rwagasore Stadium, Bujumbura, Burundi	Burundi	3–1	3–1	2017 Africa Cup of Nations qualification
3.	16 June 2016	Sam Nujoma Stadium, Windhoek, Namibia	Botswana	1–0	1–1 (4–5 p)	2016 COSAFA Cup
4.	21 June 2016	Sam Nujoma Stadium, Windhoek, Namibia	Mozambique	3–0	3–0	2016 COSAFA Cup
5.	16 July 2017	Sam Nujoma Stadium, Windhoek, Namibia	Zimbabwe	1–0	1–0	2018 African Nations Championship qualification
6.	13 August 2017	Stade de Beaumer, Moroni, Comoros	Comoros	1–2	1–2	2018 African Nations Championship qualification
7.	11 November 2017	Sam Nujoma Stadium, Windhoek, Namibia	Zimbabwe	1–0	3–1	Friendly
8.	11 November 2017	Sam Nujoma Stadium, Windhoek, Namibia	Zimbabwe	3–1	3–1	Friendly
