= Sandile (name) =

Sandile is a masculine African name that is derived from the Nguni word ukwanda/kwandile, meaning "to increase/multiply/to grow/expand." It may refer to

- Sandile Ginindza, Swaziland football player
- Sandile Hlatjwako (born 1988), Swaziland football player
- Sandile Ndlovu (born 1980), South African football striker
- Sandile Ngcobo (born 1953), justice in the Constitutional Court of South Africa
- Sandile Ngcobo (rugby union) (born 1989), South African rugby union player
- Sandile Sibande (born 1987), South African football midfielder

== See also ==
- Sandile (disambiguation)
