= Jane Thabantso =

Mosotho footballer (born 1996)

Jane Thabantšo
Personal information
- Date of birth: 22 January 1996 (age 30)
- Place of birth: Thaba Bosiu, Maseru, Lesotho
- Height: 1.75 m (5 ft 9 in)
- Position: Forward

Team information
- Current team: Lijabatho

Senior career*
Years	Team	Apps	(Gls)
2014–2026	Matlama	222	(111)
2026	Lijabatho	24	(17)

International career^{‡}
2014–	Lesotho	101	(15)
- * Club domestic league appearances and goals ‡ National team caps and goals as of 16 May 2026

Jane Thabantšo (also spelled Thaba-Ntšo; born 22 January 1996) is a Mosotho professional footballer who plays as a forward for Lijabatho and the Lesotho national team.

Thabantso's scoring abilities have led him to significant success on the international level. He currently stands as the all-time top scorer and top appearance-maker for the Lesotho national team.

== Career statistics ==
=== Club ===
Club	Season	Division	League		Cup		Continental		Total	
Club	Season	Division	Apps	Goals	Apps	Goals	Apps	Goals	Apps	Goals
Matlama	2014-15	Lesotho Premier League	12	7					12	7
Matlama	2015-16	Lesotho Premier League	23	12					23	12
Matlama	2016-17	Lesotho Premier League	25	10					25	10
Matlama	2017-18	Lesotho Premier League								
Matlama	2018-19	Lesotho Premier League	21	7					21	7
Matlama	2019-20	Lesotho Premier League	18	11					18	11
Matlama	2020-21	Lesotho Premier League	26	14					26	14
Matlama	2022-23	Lesotho Premier League	29	15			2	0	31	15
Matlama	2023-24	Lesotho Premier League	30	17					30	17
Matlama	2024-25	Lesotho Premier League	28	13	1	1			29	14
Matlama	2025-26	Lesotho Premier League	10	5					10	5
Matlama	Total		222	111	1	1	2	0	225	112
Lijabatho	2025-26	Lesotho Premier League	15	11	1	0			16	11
Lijabatho	2026-27	Lesotho Premier League	9	6					9	6
Lijabatho	Total		24	17	1	0			25	17
Total career			246	128	2	1	2	0	250	129

== International career ==
Thabantso made his senior international debut on 19 November 2014 in a 2015 Africa Cup of Nations qualification match against Gabon. On 12 June 2016, he scored thirty-four seconds in a 2016 COSAFA Cup match against Mauritius. The goal set the record for the fastest ever scored in the COSAFA Cup. On 28 June 2024, he scored against the Seychelles for his seventh goal in the COSAFA Cup, tying him with Sera Motebang for Lesotho's all-time top scorer in the competition, and placing him only two goals behind Felix Badenhorst on the tournament's all-time scoring chart.

=== International goals ===
Scores and results list Lesotho's goal tally first.

List of international goals scored by Jane Thabantso
No.	Date	Venue	Opponent	Score	Result	Competition
1.	5 June 2016	Setsoto Stadium, Maseru, Lesotho	Ethiopia	1–2	1–2	2017 Africa Cup of Nations qualification
2.	12 June 2016	Independence Stadium, Windhoek, Namibia	Mauritius	1–0	3–0	2016 COSAFA Cup
3.	16 June 2016	Sam Nujoma Stadium, Katutura, Namibia	Malawi	1–0	1–0	2016 COSAFA Cup
4.	18 June 2016	Sam Nujoma Stadium, Katutura, Namibia	South Africa	1–1	1–1	2016 COSAFA Cup
5.	7 June 2019	Moses Mabhida Stadium, Durban, South Africa	Zimbabwe	1–1	2–2	2019 COSAFA Cup
6.	4 August 2019	Dobsonville Stadium, Johannesburg, South Africa	South Africa	1–0	2–0	2020 African Nations Championship qualification
7.	4 August 2019	Dobsonville Stadium, Johannesburg, South Africa	South Africa	2–0	2–0	2020 African Nations Championship qualification
8.	13 November 2019	National Stadium, Freetown, Sierra Leone	Sierra Leone	1–1	1–1	2021 Africa Cup of Nations qualification
9.	30 May 2022	Adama Science and Technology University Stadium, Adama, Ethiopia	Ethiopia	1–1	1–1	Friendly
10.	8 July 2022	King Zwelithini Stadium, Durban, South Africa	Mauritius	2–1	2–1	2022 COSAFA Cup
11.	25 February 2023	Bingu National Stadium, Lilongwe, Malawi	Malawi	1–1	1–1	Friendly
12.	14 July 2023	King Zwelithini Stadium, Durban, South Africa	Malawi	1–0	1–1	2023 COSAFA Cup
13.	21 March 2024	Addis Ababa Stadium, Addis Ababa, Ethiopia	Ethiopia	1–0	2–1	Friendly
14.	7 June 2024	Orlando Stadium, Johannesburg, South Africa	Zimbabwe	2–0	2–0	2026 FIFA World Cup qualification
15.	28 June 2024	Nelson Mandela Bay Stadium, Gqeberha, South Africa	Seychelles	1–0	1–1	2024 COSAFA Cup
Last updated 28 June 2024
