= Diedhiou =

Diedhiou or Diédhiou may refer to:

- Amath Diedhiou
- Amath Ndiaye Diedhiou
- Bineta Diedhiou
- Christophe Diedhiou
- Famara Diedhiou
- Hortense Diédhiou
- Ibrahima Diédhiou
- Malang Diedhiou
- Simon Diedhiou
