= 2015–16 Namibia Premier League =

Namibia Premier League
- Season: 2015–16
- Champions: Tigers
- Relegated: Flamingo; Julinho Sporting; United Stars
- 2017 CAF Champions League: Tigers
- Matches: 240
- Goals: 582 (2.43 per match)
- Biggest home win: Black Africa 7-0 Flamingo (12 March 2016)
- Biggest away win: 2 matches: Flamingo 0-6 Blue Waters (24 April 2016); Rundu Chiefs 0-6 United Stars (24 April 2016)
- Highest scoring: Julinho Sporting 5-3 Tura Magic (5 March 2016)
- Longest winning run: Tura Magic (8)
- Longest unbeaten run: Tigers (21)
- Longest winless run: Flamingo (11)
- Longest losing run: Young Chiefs (4)
- All statistics correct as of 24 April 2016.

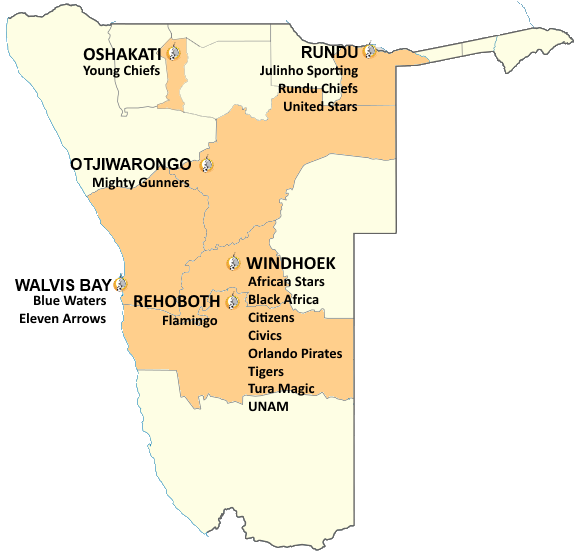
Map of the Namibia Premier League 2015/16 Season

The 2015–16 Namibia Premier League is the 27th season of top-tier football in Namibia. The season started on 11 September 2014. Tigers won their first championship since the league's first season in 1985, clinching the title with a week to go and finishing nine points ahead of runners up Black Africa.

United Stars, Julinho Sporting and Flamingo finished in the bottom three spots and will be relegated to the First Division for the 2016-2017 season.

== Teams ==
A total of 16 teams contested the league. Touch & Go F.C., Rebels F.C. and Benfica F.C. were each relegated to First Division after finishing 14th, 15th and 16th, respectively. Flamingos FC, Rundu Chiefs and Young Chiefs F.C. are all new additions to the competition this year.

=== Stadiums and locations ===
Locations of the 2014-15 Namibia Premier League teams

Team	Home city	Stadium	Capacity
African Stars F.C.	Windhoek	Khomasdal Stadium	2,000
Black Africa S.C.	Windhoek	Sam Nujoma Stadium	12,300
Blue Waters F.C.	Walvis Bay	Narraville Stadium	1,500
Citizens F.C.	Windhoek	Sam Nujoma Stadium	12,300
F.C. Civics Windhoek	Windhoek	Sam Nujoma Stadium	12,300
Eleven Arrows F.C.	Walvis Bay	Narraville Stadium	1,500
Flamingos FC	Rehoboth		
Julinho Sporting F.C.	Rundu	Rundu Sports Stadium	500
Mighty Gunners F.C.	Otjiwarongo	Mokati Stadium	1,000
Orlando Pirates S.C.	Windhoek	Sam Nujoma Stadium	12,300
Rundu Chiefs	Rundu	Rundu Sports Stadium	500
United Africa Tigers	Windhoek	Sam Nujoma Stadium	12,300
Tura Magic F.C.	Windhoek	Sam Nujoma Stadium	12,300
University of Namibia	Windhoek		
United Stars F.C.	Rundu	Rundu Sports Stadium	500
Young Chiefs F.C.	Oshakati		

== League table ==
Pos	Team	Pld	W	D	L	GF	GA	GD	Pts	Qualification or relegation
1	Tigers (C, Q)	30	20	7	3	46	25	+21	67	2017 CAF Champions League
2	Black Africa	30	17	8	5	44	18	+26	59	
3	Tura Magic	30	13	12	5	45	27	+18	51	
4	African Stars	30	13	9	8	33	20	+13	48	
5	Mighty Gunners	30	12	8	10	46	40	+6	44	
6	Blue Waters	30	12	8	10	38	32	+6	44	
7	Civics	30	11	10	9	37	33	+4	43	
8	Orlando Pirates	30	12	7	11	35	34	+1	43	
9	Eleven Arrows	30	11	7	12	30	36	−6	40	
10	UNAM	30	10	6	14	38	38	0	36	
11	Rundu Chiefs	30	8	9	13	30	40	−10	33	
12	Young Chiefs	30	8	8	14	32	38	−6	32	
13	Citizens	30	8	8	14	35	47	−12	32	
14	United Stars (R)	30	8	7	15	45	53	−8	31	Relegation to First Division
15	Julinho Sporting (R)	30	7	7	16	28	44	−16	28	Relegation to First Division
16	Flamingo (R)	30	5	9	16	19	56	−37	24	Relegation to First Division

Updated to match(es) played on 24 April 2016. Source: Soccerway.com
Rules for classification: 1) points; 2) goal difference; 3) total goals; 4) head-to-head points; 5) head-to-head goal difference; 6) head-to-head goals scored; 7) playoff
(C) Champions; (Q) Qualified for the phase indicated; (R) Relegated

== Results ==
All teams play in a double round robin system (home and away).

Home \ Away	AFS	BAF	BLW	CIT	CIV	ELA	FLA	JUL	MGU	ORL	RUN	TIG	TUR	UNA	UST	YCH
African Stars		2–0	0–2	2–1	0–0	0–0	3–1	2–0	2–1	0–1	1–0	1–2	1–0	2–0	1–2	3–0
Black Africa	1–0		3–0	1–1	1–1	3–0	7–0	2–0	1–0	0–1	1–0	2–4	0–0	2–2	3–0	3–1
Blue Waters	1–1	1–1		2–0	1–1	0–0	1–1	2–1	2–0	1–0	2–0	0–0	1–3	1–0	4–1	1–1
Citizens	0–4	0–1	0–3		0–1	1–0	0–1	3–0	2–3	1–1	2–4	3–2	1–1	2–0	3–2	1–1
Civics	0–0	0–2	1–0	2–1		3–1	2–2	1–1	2–1	0–1	2–1	1–2	1–1	2–2	3–0	2–1
Eleven Arrows	0–1	0–1	1–0	1–2	2–1		2–1	3–1	0–1	1–0	1–1	0–2	1–3	2–0	3–3	0–0
Flamingo	0–0	1–1	0–6	0–0	1–1	0–1		0–1	0–0	2–0	1–0	0–1	1–1	1–3	0–0	1–0
Julinho Sporting	1–2	0–1	1–0	0–0	1–2	1–0	1–0		1–1	1–2	0–2	1–1	5–3	2–1	1–3	0–1
Mighty Gunners	1–1	0–1	2–0	1–1	2–1	2–1	3–1	1–0		2–2	0–0	3–4	1–4	2–1	2–0	6–1
Orlando Pirates	0–0	0–1	4–0	2–2	1–2	1–1	3–0	1–0	1–4		2–1	1–1	0–0	2–3	4–2	1–0
Rundu Chiefs	1–1	0–1	2–1	1–2	2–1	1–1	3–0	1–1	3–2	1–2		0–1	1–1	1–1	0–6	0–1
Tigers	1–0	0–3	1–1	3–1	1–0	3–0	1–0	2–0	1–0	1–0	1–1		1–0	0–0	2–1	1–0
Tura Magic	2–1	0–0	4–1	2–1	1–0	1–1	5–0	1–2	2–2	1–0	0–0	2–1		1–0	0–0	0–0
UNAM	2–1	1–0	0–1	2–1	1–2	0–1	6–1	2–2	0–1	2–0	1–2	1–2	2–1		2–0	1–2
United Stars	0–0	1–1	1–1	1–3	1–0	2–3	2–3	1–0	2–2	4–1	4–0	2–3	1–3	1–2		1–0
Young Chiefs	0–1	2–0	0–1	3–0	2–2	1–2	2–0	3–3	3–0	0–1	1–2	1–1	2–1	1–1	3–1	

Updated to match(es) played on 24 April 2016. Source: soccerway.com
Legend: Blue = home team win; Yellow = draw; Red = away team win.

=== Results by round ===
Team ╲ Round	1	2	3	4	5	6	7	8	9	10	11	12	13	14	15	16	17	18	19	20	21	22	23	24	25	26	27	28	29	30
African Stars	W	W	W	D	W	W	L	L	D	D	W	L	D	D	L	D	W	D	D	W	L	W	W	L	L	L	W	W	W	D
Black Africa	W	D	W	W	W	W	D	W	L	D	L	W	W	W	D	W	W	L	W	D	D	W	L	W	D	L	D	W	W	W
Blue Waters	D	D	L	W	D	W	L	L	W	L	L	W	W	D	W	D	D	D	L	W	D	W	W	D	L	W	W	L	L	W
Citizens	L	L	L	D	W	D	L	W	L	L	W	W	D	D	D	L	L	L	L	L	D	L	W	D	W	W	D	L	L	W
Civics	D	D	W	L	D	L	L	D	L	W	W	L	D	W	D	W	L	D	L	L	D	W	W	W	D	D	W	W	L	W
Eleven Arrows	L	W	W	D	D	D	W	L	L	D	L	D	W	D	L	L	L	L	W	W	W	L	L	D	W	D	L	W	W	L
Flamingo	D	L	D	L	D	L	D	L	D	L	L	W	W	D	D	L	W	L	L	D	L	L	L	L	W	D	L	W	L	L
Julinho Sporting	L	L	L	W	D	D	L	D	W	D	L	L	L	L	D	L	L	W	W	L	L	W	W	L	L	L	W	L	D	D
Mighty Gunners	L	L	D	W	D	D	W	W	W	L	L	L	W	L	D	W	L	W	D	W	D	W	L	D	W	W	L	W	L	D
Orlando Pirates	D	L	D	D	L	W	W	W	W	D	W	W	L	W	W	L	W	D	D	L	L	W	W	L	L	W	D	L	L	L
Rundu Chiefs	L	W	L	D	D	L	W	L	W	W	L	L	L	D	D	W	D	W	L	W	D	L	L	L	W	D	L	D	D	L
Tigers	W	W	W	D	D	W	W	W	W	D	W	W	W	D	W	W	D	D	W	W	W	L	W	W	L	W	W	D	W	L
Tura Magic	D	D	W	D	L	L	L	D	L	D	W	W	D	D	L	D	D	W	D	D	D	L	W	W	W	W	W	W	W	W
UNAM	D	W	L	L	D	L	W	D	W	W	W	L	L	D	D	L	L	L	W	D	W	W	L	L	W	L	L	L	W	L
United Stars	W	W	D	L	L	D	W	D	L	D	L	D	L	L	L	W	W	D	L	L	W	L	L	W	L	L	D	L	L	W
Young Chiefs	W	L	L	D	D	D	L	D	L	W	W	L	L	D	W	D	W	W	W	L	D	L	L	W	L	L	L	L	W	D

Updated to match(es) played on 24 April 2016. Source: Soccerway
W = Win; D = Draw; L = Lose

== Positions by round ==
Team ╲ Round	1	2	3	4	5	6	7	8	9	10	11	12	13	14	15	16	17	18	19	20	21	22	23	24	25	26	27	28	29	30
Tigers	2	2	1	2	3	3	2	2	1	1	1	1	1	1	1	1	1	1	1	1	1	1	1	1	1	1	1	1	1	1
Black Africa	4	5	4	1	1	1	1	1	2	2	2	2	2	2	2	2	2	2	2	2	2	2	2	2	2	2	2	2	2	2
Tura Magic	10	11	6	6	6	8	11	12	13	12	13	8	9	10	12	12	12	13	10	8	7	7	7	7	4	5	4	3	3	3
African Stars	3	3	2	3	2	2	3	3	3	4	3	4	4	4	4	4	4	4	4	4	4	3	4	4	6	7	6	4	4	4
Mighty Gunners	12	14	14	9	9	9	7	5	5	6	6	6	7	8	7	6	6	7	6	7	5	6	6	6	3	4	7	5	5	5
Blue Waters	8	10	13	8	8	5	8	9	8	10	12	7	6	6	5	5	5	5	7	5	6	4	5	5	7	6	5	7	7	6
Civics	6	9	7	7	7	11	13	14	15	15	9	14	11	9	8	7	8	6	11	12	13	13	9	8	9	8	8	8	8	7
Orlando Pirates	10	12	11	13	15	7	6	4	4	5	4	3	3	3	3	3	3	3	3	3	3	5	3	3	5	3	3	6	6	8
Eleven Arrows	13	6	5	5	4	4	4	7	9	11	11	10	8	7	9	11	13	10	13	6	10	10	11	10	10	10	10	9	9	9
UNAM	6	4	8	9	10	13	9	8	6	3	5	5	5	5	6	8	9	11	8	11	8	8	8	9	8	9	9	10	10	10
Rundu Chiefs	16	8	10	12	12	15	10	11	10	7	7	11	13	12	13	9	11	12	9	13	9	9	10	11	12	11	11	11	11	11
Young Chiefs	4	7	9	11	11	10	12	13	14	8	8	13	14	13	10	10	7	8	5	9	11	11	12	12	13	13	14	14	12	12
Citizens	15	15	15	16	13	12	14	10	12	13	14	12	10	11	11	14	14	14	14	14	14	14	15	15	11	12	12	12	13	13
United Stars	1	1	3	4	5	6	5	6	7	9	10	9	12	14	14	13	10	9	12	10	12	12	13	13	14	14	15	15	14	14
Julinho Sporting	13	16	16	14	14	14	15	15	11	14	15	15	16	16	16	16	16	15	15	15	15	15	14	14	15	15	13	13	15	15
Flamingo	8	12	12	15	16	16	16	16	16	16	16	16	15	15	15	15	15	16	16	16	16	16	16	16	16	16	16	16	16	16

Leader
Relegation to Zimbabwe Division 1

Updated to match(es) played on 24 April 2016. Source:
