= Charles Zulu =

Zambian footballer (born 1996)

Personal information
- Full name: Charles Zulu
- Date of birth: 2 January 1996 (age 30)
- Place of birth: Lusaka, Zambia
- Height: 1.60 m (5 ft 3 in)
- Position: Midfielder

Team information
- Current team: Azam

Senior career*
Years	Team	Apps	(Gls)
2013–2020	Zanaco		
2020–2021	Cape Town City	13	(0)
2021–	Azam		

International career^{‡}
- Zambia U17
- Zambia U20
- Zambia U23
2014–2019	Zambia	19	(2)
- * Club domestic league appearances and goals as of 4 October 2022 ‡ National team caps and goals as of 16 June 2026

Charles Zulu (born 2 January 1996) is a Zambian professional footballer who plays as a midfielder for Aba Red Nkana Football Club and the Zambia national football team.

== Early life ==
He was born in Lusaka. He completed high school in 2012 at David Kaunda Technical School.

== Club career ==
He signed for South African Premier Division club Cape Town City on a four-year contract on 23 October 2020. After one season he went on to Azam.

== International career ==
At the youth level he was capped at under-17, under-20 and under-23 levels.

Zulu made his senior international debut for Zambia in 2014, playing 90 minutes in a 2015 Africa Cup of Nations qualification game against Niger. He scored his first goal at the 2016 COSAFA Cup; the winner in a 3–2 victory over Lesotho.

== Career statistics ==
=== International ===
As of match played 14 November 2017.

National team	Year	Apps	Goals
Zambia	2014	3	0
Zambia	2015	5	0
Zambia	2016	4	1
Zambia	2017	0	0
Zambia	2018	0	0
Zambia	2019	2	0
Zambia	2020	0	0
Zambia	2021	0	0
Zambia	2022	0	0
Zambia	2023	0	0
Zambia	2024	0	0
Zambia	2025	5	1
Total		19	2

=== International goals ===
Scores and results list Zambia's goal tally first.

No.	Date	Venue	Opponent	Score	Result	Competition
1.	21 June 2016	Sam Nujoma Stadium, Windhoek, Namibia	Lesotho	3–2	3–2	2016 COSAFA Cup
2.	11 June 2025	Dr. Petrus Molemela Stadium, Bloemfontein, South Africa	Botswana	1–2	3–3	2025 COSAFA Cup
