= Valère Billen =

Belgian football coach

Personal information
- Date of birth: 23 November 1952 (age 73)
- Place of birth: Belgium

Managerial career
- Years: Team
- 2005–2006: Újpest (assistant)
- 2006: Újpest
- 2007: Sint-Truiden
- 2008–2009: Dessel
- 2009–2011: Beerschot A.C. (youth)
- 2011–2012: KVK Tienen
- 2012–2013: Swaziland
- 2012: Swaziland U20
- 2014–2016: KFC Duffel
- 2016: KVK Tienen

Valère Billen (born 23 November 1952) is a Belgian football coach. He has coached in Ivory Coast where he managed Satellite FC Abidjan.

== Coaching career ==
=== Swaziland national team ===
Appointed Swaziland head coach in 2012 on a one-year contract, Billen was bought a new car by the National Football Association of Swaziland as a mode of conveyance was one of the rules his contract embodied. With a monthly salary of 100000 Swaziland lilangenis, and the Swaziland Football Association spending 40000 on his rent, the Belgian's first match was a friendly against Lesotho in October, losing 2–1. Two days later, he helped them achieve a 1–0 victory over Lesotho again. Praising his players for their efforts that game, his charges held Lesotho to a 0–0 stalemate in their third and final friendly in preparation for the 2014 African Nations Championship qualifying two-legged round opposing Angola, losing 1–0 both legs. That same month, the former footballer stated that his desire was to work with local coaches and predicted a rise in the FIFA World Rankings, claiming that they would improve dramatically over time. In 2013, he went with the national selection to participate in the 2013 COSAFA Cup, not having a presentiment of failure and predicting that they would overcome all seemingly insuperable obstacles and deliver a good showing in the tournament; however, despite a draw with Botswana in their opener, the Sihlangu never progressed past the group stage, losing 2–0 twice to Kenya and Lesotho with Billen reconsidering his job as coach. Being thrashed 10–0 by Egypt in a friendly worsened the trainer's position, with fans requesting for his immediate dismissal as they were not expecting such a scoreline; but, despite fan pressure, the National Football Association of Swaziland still did not sack Billen until November 2013, with local Harris Bulunga taking up the interim post. The reason they gave for his firing was that he was in Belgium too often and spent more time there rather than helping the Swaziland Football Association.

The coach temporarily returned to Belgium to care for his mother, who was ill.

One year succeeding his appointment, Billen criticized his Swazi coaching colleagues, saying that they never allowed him to share his ideas.
