= Kunene =

Kunene or Cunene may refer to:

== Geography ==
- Kunene River (also spelled Cunene), Angola and Namibia
- Kunene Region, Namibia
- Cunene Province, Angola

== People ==
- Daniel Kunene (1923–2016), South African literary scholar, translator and writer
- Dominic Kunene, Liswati football manager
- Kenny Kunene (born 1970), South African businessman
- Manqoba Kunene (born 1982), Liswati footballer
- Madala Kunene (born 1947), South African musician
- Mazisi Kunene (1930–2006), South African poet and historian
- Ntandoyenkosi Kunene, South African beauty pageant contestant
- Victor Kunene (born 1966), South African boxer
