= Lawrence Mhlanga =

Zimbabwean footballer (born 1993)

Personal information
- Date of birth: 20 December 1993 (age 32)
- Place of birth: Zimbabwe
- Height: 1.97 m (6 ft 5 1/2 in)
- Position: Defender

Team information
- Current team: Chicken Inn
- Number: 25

Senior career*
Years	Team	Apps	(Gls)
2013	Bantu Rovers		
2013	Monomotapa United		
2014–2017	Chicken Inn		
2017–	Platinum Zvishavane		

International career^{‡}
2014–	Zimbabwe	10	(2)
Medal record
Chicken Inn F.C.
Winner	Zimbabwe Premier Soccer League	2015
F.C. Platinum
Winner	Zimbabwe Premier Soccer League	2017
- * Club domestic league appearances and goals as of 08:51, 18 July 2018 (UTC) ‡ National team caps and goals as of 08:51, 18 July 2018 (UTC)

Lawrence Mhlanga (born 20 December 1993), is a Zimbabwean footballer who plays for Platinum Zvishavane of the Zimbabwe Premier Soccer League and the Zimbabwe national football team as a defender.

== Club career ==
Mhlanga started his career with Bantu Rovers before moving to Monomotapa United in 2013. He joined Chicken Inn in 2014, and rejected a move to Zambian side Power Dynamos in early 2017, just before the 2017 Africa Cup of Nations.

== International career ==
Mhlanga was called up to the Zimbabwe national football team by head coach Callisto Pasuwa for the 2017 Africa Cup of Nations.

== Career statistics ==
=== International ===
As of matches played 11 April 2017.

National team	Year	Apps	Goals
Zimbabwe	2014	1	0
Zimbabwe	2015	2	0
Zimbabwe	2016	7	2
Zimbabwe	2017	0	0
Zimbabwe	2018	0	0
Total		10	2

=== International goals ===
Scores and results list Zimbabwe's goal tally first.

No	Date	Venue	Opponent	Score	Result	Competition
1.	15 June 2016	Sam Nujoma Stadium, Windhoek, Namibia	Seychelles	3–0	5–0	2016 COSAFA Cup
2.	15 June 2016	Sam Nujoma Stadium, Windhoek, Namibia	Seychelles	5–0	5–0	2016 COSAFA Cup
