= Evans Rusike =

Zimbabwean footballer (born 1990)

Personal information
- Full name: Evans Rusike
- Date of birth: 13 June 1990 (age 36)
- Place of birth: Chitungwiza, Zimbabwe
- Position: Forward

Senior career*
Years	Team	Apps	(Gls)
2010–2012	Kiglon		
2012–2015	Zimbabwe Saints		
2015–2018	Maritzburg United	74	(20)
2018–2021	Supersport United	68	(8)

International career^{‡}
2016–	Zimbabwe	27	(4)
- * Club domestic league appearances and goals as of 00:49, 2 January 2020 (UTC) ‡ National team caps and goals as of 20:35 3 June 2019 (UTC)

Evans Rusike (born 13 June 1990) is a Zimbabwean footballer who plays as a forward for Premier Soccer League side Supersport United in South Africa. He also plays for the Zimbabwe national team.

== Career ==
=== Club ===
Rusike began his career in Zimbabwe with Kiglon in 2010, before moving to Zimbabwe Saints in 2012. Three years later, in 2015, he left his homeland for the first time as he agreed to join South African Premier Soccer League club Maritzburg United. His league debut came on 22 August against Ajax Cape Town. At the end of his first season with Maritzburg, Rusike made a total of 28 appearances in all competitions for the club.

=== International ===
Rusike has made two appearances for the Zimbabwe national team, with his debut coming in March 2016 against Swaziland in a 2017 Africa Cup of Nations qualifier. His second cap came three days later against the same opponents in the same competition, a match in which he scored his first goal for Zimbabwe in a 4–0 win.

== Career statistics ==
=== Club ===
As of 18 June 2016.

Statistics
Club	Season	League			National Cup (Note: Includes the Nedbank Cup)		League Cup (Note: Includes the Telkom Knockout)		Continental (Note: Includes the CAF Champions League)		Other (Note: Includes the MTN 8)		Total	
Club	Season	Division	Apps	Goals	Apps	Goals	Apps	Goals	Apps	Goals	Apps	Goals	Apps	Goals
Maritzburg United	2015–16	Premier Soccer League	27	9	1	0	0	0	—		0	0	28	9
Maritzburg United	Total		27	9	1	0	0	0	—		0	0	28	9
Career total			27	9	1	0	0	0	—		0	0	28	9

=== International ===
As of 1 June 2019.

National team	Year	Apps	Goals
Zimbabwe
Zimbabwe	2015	4	1
Zimbabwe	2016	4	1
Zimbabwe	2017	4	0
Zimbabwe	2018	7	1
Zimbabwe	2019	2	1
Total		21	4

=== International goals ===
As of 1 June 2019. Scores and results list Zimbabwe's goal tally first.

Goal	Date	Venue	Opponent	Score	Result	Competition
1.	21 June 2015	Rufaro Stadium, Harare, Zimbabwe	Comoros	1–0	2–0	2016 African Nations Championship qualification
2.	28 March 2016	National Sports Stadium, Harare, Zimbabwe	Swaziland	3–0	4–0	2017 Africa Cup of Nations qualification
3.	3 June 2018	Peter Mokaba Stadium, Polokwane, South Africa	Botswana	1–0	1–1 (3–1 p)	2018 COSAFA Cup
4.	1 June 2019	Princess Magogo Stadium, KwaMashu, South Africa	Comoros	1–0	2–0	2019 COSAFA Cup
