= Tony Tsabedze =

Liswati footballer

Personal information
- Full name: Tony Thulani "TT" Tsabedze
- Date of birth: 29 October 1984 (age 41)
- Place of birth: Mhlambanyatsi, Swaziland
- Position: Forward

Senior career*
Years	Team	Apps	(Gls)
2002–2003	Mhlambanyatsi Rovers		
2003–2004	Silver Stars		
2004–2008	Supersport United		
2008–2009	Maritzburg United		
2009–2011	Engen Santos		
2011–2022	Mbabane Swallows F.C.		

International career^{‡}
2003–2022	Eswatini	68	(6)
- * Club domestic league appearances and goals ‡ National team caps and goals as of 18 November 2018

Tony Thulani "TT" Tsabedze (born 29 October 1984) is a retired Liswati footballer who played as a midfielder for Mbabane Swallows and the Eswatini national football team.

== Career ==
Tsabedze played domestically for Mhlambanyatsi Rovers before playing professionally in South Africa, appearing in the Premier Soccer League for Silver Stars, Supersport United, Maritzburg United, Engen Santos and Mbabane Swallows. He played for Swaziland in 2017 Africa Cup of Nations qualifying, scoring twice in a 2–1 victory over Guinea on 23 July 2015.

=== International goals ===
Scores and results list Eswatini's goal tally first.

No	Date	Venue	Opponent	Score	Result	Competition
1.	9 February 2008	Somhlolo National Stadium, Lobamba, Swaziland	Botswana	1–4	1–4	Friendly
2.	12 June 2015	Stade Mohamed V, Casablanca, Morocco	Guinea	1–0	2–1	2017 Africa Cup of Nations qualification
3.	12 June 2015	Stade Mohamed V, Casablanca, Morocco	Guinea	2–1	2–1	2017 Africa Cup of Nations qualification
4.	22 June 2015	Somhlolo National Stadium, Lobamba, Swaziland	Angola	1–2	2–2	2016 African Nations Championship qualification
5.	9 October 2015	El Hadj Hassan Gouled Aptidon Stadium, Djibouti City, Djibouti	Djibouti	5–0	6–0	2018 FIFA World Cup qualification
6.	22 June 2016	Sam Nujoma Stadium, Windhoek, Namibia	South Africa	1–0	1–5	2016 COSAFA Cup
