= Menzi Masuku =

South African soccer player (born 1993)

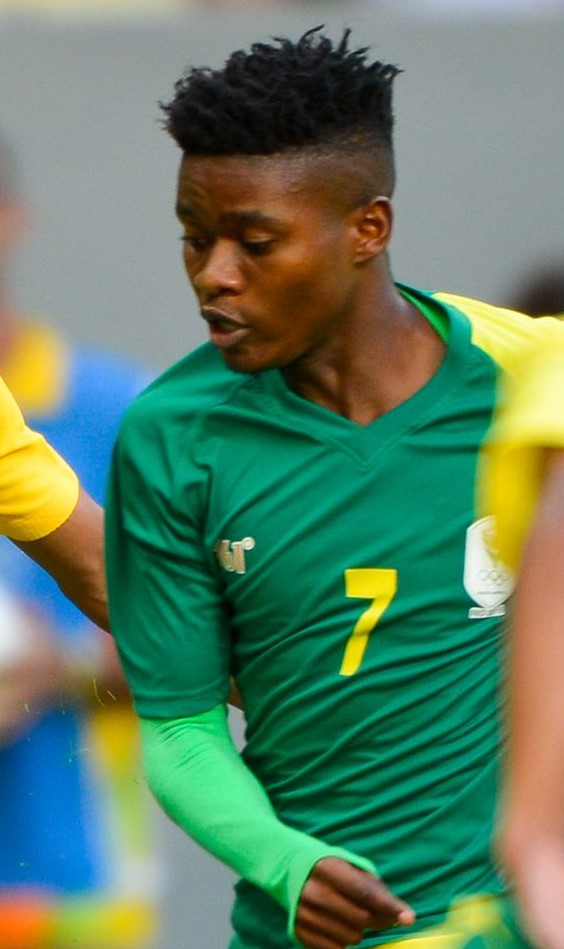

Personal information
- Full name: Menzi Alson Masuku
- Date of birth: 15 April 1993 (age 33)
- Place of birth: Durban, South Africa
- Height: 1.69 m (5 ft 7 in)
- Position: Winger

Team information
- Current team: Golden Arrows

Senior career*
Years	Team	Apps	(Gls)
2012–2013	Dynamos	10	(2)
2013	Roses United	1	(0)
2013–2014	Jomo Cosmos	14	(1)
2014–2016	Orlando Pirates	19	(4)
2016–2018	Chippa United	25	(0)
2018–2021	Bloemfontein Celtic	69	(8)
2021–2024	Royal AM	46	(5)
2024–	Golden Arrows	0	(0)

International career^{‡}
2015	South Africa U23	4	(2)
2016–2017	South Africa	4	(2)
2016	South Africa Olympic	3	(0)
- * Club domestic league appearances and goals as of 1 August 2024 ‡ National team caps and goals as of 10:12, 4 October 2020 (UTC)

Menzi Alson Masuku (born 15 April 1993) is a South African soccer player who plays as a winger for Golden Arrows.

== International goals ==
Scores and results list South Africa's goal tally first.

Goal	Date	Venue	Opponent	Score	Result	Competition
1.	22 June 2016	Sam Nujoma Stadium, Windhoek, Namibia	Swaziland	3–1	5–1	2016 COSAFA Cup
2.	22 June 2016	Sam Nujoma Stadium, Windhoek, Namibia	Swaziland	5–1	5–1	2016 COSAFA Cup

== Honours ==
Orlando Pirates

Runners-up

- MTN 8: 2014
