= Marshal Mudehwe =

Zimbabwean footballer (born 1993)

Personal information
- Full name: Marshal Tatenda Mudehwe
- Date of birth: 17 August 1993 (age 33)
- Place of birth: Chitungwiza, Zimbabwe
- Position: Midfielder

Team information
- Current team: Manica Diamonds

Youth career
- DC Academy
- Black Rhinos

Senior career*
| Years | Team | Apps | (Gls) |
| 2013–2018 | Platinum | | |
| 2019– | Manica Diamonds | | |

International career^{‡}
| 2014– | Zimbabwe | 17 | (2) |
- * Club domestic league appearances and goals ‡ National team caps and goals as of 19:59, 9 October 2020 (UTC)

Marshal Tatenda Mudehwe (born 17 August 1993) is a Zimbabwean footballer who plays as a midfielder for Manica Diamonds and the Zimbabwe national team.

== Club career ==
Born in Chitungwiza, Mudehwe played for DC Academy and Black Rhinos in his youth career before making the move into senior football when he joined Platinum, who he signed for in 2013. In January 2019, Mudehwe joined newly promoted Manica Diamonds after rejecting a new contract from Platinum.

== International career ==
Mudehwe has won 16 caps and scored 2 goals for the Zimbabwe national team.

== Career statistics ==
As of 9 October 2020

| National team | Year | Apps | Goals |
|---|---|---|---|
| Zimbabwe | 2014 | 4 | 0 |
| Zimbabwe | 2015 | 7 | 1 |
| Zimbabwe | 2016 | 6 | 1 |
| Total | | 17 | 2 |

As of 16 April 2018 Scores and results list Zimbabwe's goal tally first.

| Goal | Date | Venue | Opponent | Score | Result | Competition |
|---|---|---|---|---|---|---|
| 1 | 20 June 2015 | Rufaro Stadium, Harare, Zimbabwe | Comoros | 2–0 | 2–0 | 2016 African Nations Championship qualification |
| 2 | 15 June 2016 | Sam Nujoma Stadium, Windhoek, Namibia | Seychelles | 2–0 | 5–0 | 2016 COSAFA Cup |

== Honours ==
Platinum

- Cup of Zimbabwe: 2014
- Zimbabwean Independence Trophy: 2014
- Zimbabwe Premier Soccer League: 2017, 2018
