= Francis Banda =

Zambian football manager

Personal information
- Place of birth: Zambia

Managerial career
- Years: Team
- 1998–2000: Swaziland
- 2003: Swaziland (interim )
- 2005: Swaziland
- Green Mamba FC

Francis 'Mkhulu' Banda is a Zambian professional football manager.

== Career ==
Since 1998 until 2000 he coached the Swaziland national football team. After resignation of Mlanda Dlamini in September 2003 he was an interim coach of Swaziland national team until October 2003. In 2005, he again coached Swaziland national team. In 2011, he worked as a head coach of Green Mamba FC.
