= Sandile Ginindza =

Personal information
- Date of birth: 28 July 1988 (age 38)
- Place of birth: Swaziland
- Height: 1.80 m (5 ft 11 in)
- Position: Goalkeeper

Team information
- Current team: Mbombela United

Senior career*
Years	Team	Apps	(Gls)
2012-2013	Royal Eagles F.C.	15	(0)
2015-2018	Mbabane Swallows F.C.		
2018-	Mbombela United	10	(0)

International career
2010–	Eswatini	15	(1)
- * Club domestic league appearances and goals

Sandile 'Nkomishi' Ginindza is a Liswati professional footballer who plays for Mbabane Swallows F.C. and the Eswatini national football team.

== Career ==
Sandile Ginindza played in the 4-2 2016 COSAFA Cup win over Zambia, making two penalty shoot-out saves before scoring the winning penalty, therefore scoring his first career penalty thus enabling his team to reach the semi-finals. Also, he was named in both Swaziland squads for the 2017 Africa Cup of Nations qualifiers and for the 2016 COSAFA Cup.

Orlando Pirates FC were reportedly watching him play in a 3-0 win over Manzini Sea Birds F.C. to replace their late goalkeeper Senzo Meyiwa.

Assailing a Mbabane Swallows F.C. fan and a Deputy Sheriff who tried to intervene, he was brought before a magistrate and was liable to be fined E15000 which is the consequence for assaulting a spectator according to the Swazi Premier League rules in Article 7.

Featured as 'Moemish of the Week' in the show Soccer Zone on Monday when he made an error which made it 2-0 for Thanda Royal Zulu F.C.
