= Scara Thindwa =

Swazi footballer (born 1960)

Personal information
- Full name: Absalom Thindwa
- Date of birth: 6 January 1960 (age 66)
- Place of birth: Piggs Peak, Eswatini
- Positions: Winger; forward

Senior career*
Years	Team	Apps	(Gls)
1985–1992	Kaizer Chiefs		
- Bidvest Wits

International career
- Eswatini

Managerial career
- 1996: Eswatini
- * Club domestic league appearances and goals

Absalom Thindwa (born 6 January 1960) is a Swazi former football manager and footballer.

== Life and career ==
Thindwa was born on 6 January 1950 in Piggs Peak, Eswatini. He mainly operated as a winger or as a forward. He is right-footed. In 1985, he signed for South African side Kaizer Chiefs. He was described as "one of the most exciting wingers to play in South Africa" while playing for the club. He helped them win the league. After that, he signed for South African side Bidvest Wits. He was an Eswatini international. He played for the Eswatini national football team for 1994 FIFA World Cup qualification.

Thindwa worked as the assistant manager of South African side Bidvest Wits. In 1996, he was appointed manager of the Eswatini national football team. He managed the Eswatini national football team for 1998 FIFA World Cup qualification. After retiring from professional football, he worked as a football commentator. After retiring from professional football, he lived in Johannesburg, South Africa. He has been a Christian, married and has two children.
