= Paul Katema (footballer) =

Zambian footballer (born 1997)

Personal information
- Date of birth: 19 September 1997 (age 29)
- Place of birth: Lusaka, Zambia
- Height: 1.80 m (5 ft 11 in)
- Position: Midfielder

Team information
- Current team: Azam

Senior career*
| Years | Team | Apps | (Gls) |
| 2014–2021 | Red Arrows | | |
| 2021– | Azam | | |

International career^{‡}
| 2015– | Zambia | 27 | (1) |
- * Club domestic league appearances and goals as of 23:03, 9 August 2021 (UTC) ‡ National team caps and goals as of 23:03, 9 August 2021 (UTC)

Paul Katema (born 19 September 1997) is a Zambian footballer who plays as a midfielder for Azam and the Zambia national football team.

== Club career ==
In July 2021, Katema joined Tanzanian side Azam on a two-year contract.

== International career ==
=== International goals ===
Scores and results list Zambia's goal tally first.

| No. | Date | Venue | Opponent | Score | Result | Competition |
|---|---|---|---|---|---|---|
| 1. | 21 June 2016 | Sam Nujoma Stadium, Windhoek, Namibia | Lesotho | 1–0 | 3–2 | 2016 COSAFA Cup |
