= 2017 Africa Cup of Nations qualification Group L =

Football tournament qualification stage

Group L of the 2017 Africa Cup of Nations qualification tournament was one of the thirteen groups to decide the teams which qualified for the 2017 Africa Cup of Nations finals tournament. The group consisted of four teams: Guinea, Malawi, Zimbabwe, and Swaziland.

The teams played against each other home-and-away in a round-robin format, between June 2015 and September 2016.

Zimbabwe, the group winners, qualified for the 2017 Africa Cup of Nations.

== Standings ==
Pos	Team	Pld	W	D	L	GF	GA	GD	Pts	Qualification	Zimbabwe	Eswatini	Guinea	Malawi
1	Zimbabwe	6	3	2	1	11	4	+7	11	Final tournament	—	4–0	1–1	3–0
2	Swaziland	6	2	2	2	6	9	−3	8		1–1	—	1–0	2–2
3	Guinea	6	2	2	2	5	5	0	8		1–0	1–2	—	0–0
4	Malawi	6	1	2	3	5	9	−4	5		1–2	1–0	1–2	—

Source: CAF
Rules for classification: Qualification tiebreakers

== Matches ==
12 June 2015
19:00 UTC±0

Guinea	1–2	Swaziland
Kamano 67'	Report	Tsabedze 11', 83'

Stade Mohamed V, Casablanca (Morocco) (Note: Guinea played their home match against Swaziland outside of their country due to Ebola outbreak.)
Referee: Manuel Timas (Cape Verde)
13 June 2015
14:30 UTC+2

Malawi	1–2	Zimbabwe
Banda 24'	Report	Malajila 23'; Billiat 83'

Kamuzu Stadium, Blantyre
Referee: Christopher Nde (Cameroon)

6 September 2015
15:00 UTC+2

Swaziland	2–2	Malawi
Badenhorst 17'; Ndzinisa 62'	Report	Phiri 8'; Msowoya 21'

Somhlolo National Stadium, Lobamba
Referee: Osiase Koto (Lesotho)
6 September 2015
15:00 UTC+2

Zimbabwe	1–1	Guinea
Musona 34'	Report	Sylla 2'

Rufaro Stadium, Harare
Referee: Lekgotla Johannes (Botswana)

25 March 2016
15:30 UTC+2

Swaziland	1–1	Zimbabwe
Badenhorst 2'	Report	Ndlovu 44' (o.g.)

Somhlolo National Stadium, Lobamba
Referee: Hélder Martins de Carvalho (Angola)
25 March 2016
17:00 UTC±0

Guinea	0–0	Malawi
	Report

Stade du 28 Septembre, Conakry
Referee: Youssef Essrayri (Tunisia)

28 March 2016
15:00 UTC+2

Zimbabwe	4–0	Swaziland
Musona 52' (pen.); Nhamoinesu 59'; Rusike 77'; Billiat 85'	Report

National Sports Stadium, Harare
Referee: Ali Adelaïd (Comoros)
29 March 2016
14:30 UTC+2

Malawi	1–2	Guinea
Msowoya 30'	Report	Yattara 45'; Sylla 60'

Kamuzu Stadium, Blantyre
Referee: Parmendra Nunkoo (Mauritius)

5 June 2016
15:00 UTC+2

Swaziland	1–0	Guinea
Ndzinisa 46'	Report

Somhlolo National Stadium, Lobamba
Referee: Janny Sikazwe (Zambia)
5 June 2016
15:00 UTC+2

Zimbabwe	3–0	Malawi
Musona 15' (pen.); Billiat 36'; Malajila 87'	Report

National Sports Stadium, Harare
Referee: Juste Ephrem Zio (Burkina Faso)

4 September 2016
15:00 UTC+2

Malawi	1–0	Swaziland
Phiri 8'	Report

Kamuzu Stadium, Blantyre
Referee: Jean-Jacques Ndala (DR Congo)
4 September 2016
17:00 UTC±0

Guinea	1–0	Zimbabwe
Landel 12'	Report

Stade du 28 Septembre, Conakry
Referee: Mohamed Ragab Omar (Libya)

== Goalscorers ==
3 goals

- (Zimbabwe) Khama Billiat
- (Zimbabwe) Knowledge Musona

2 goals

- (Guinea) Idrissa Sylla
- (Malawi) Chiukepo Msowoya
- (Malawi) Gerald Phiri Jr.
- (Eswatini) Felix Badenhorst
- (Eswatini) Sabelo Ndzinisa
- (Eswatini) Tony Tsabedze
- (Zimbabwe) Cuthbert Malajila

1 goal

- (Guinea) François Kamano
- (Guinea) Guy-Michel Landel
- (Guinea) Mohamed Yattara
- (Malawi) John Banda
- (Zimbabwe) Costa Nhamoinesu
- (Zimbabwe) Evans Rusike

1 own goal

- (Eswatini) Njabulo Ndlovu (playing against Zimbabwe)
