= Njabulo Ndlovu =

Swazi footballer (born 1994)

Personal information
- Full name: Njabulo Ndlovu
- Date of birth: December 29, 1994 (age 31)
- Place of birth: Swaziland (since 2018 renamed to Eswatini)
- Position: Midfielder

Team information
- Current team: Green Mamba

Senior career*
Years	Team	Apps	(Gls)
2015–2022	Mbabane Swallows		
2019–2020	→ Mbombela United (loan)	21	(0)
2022–	Green Mamba		

International career
2011–2019	eSwatini	37	(1)
- * Club domestic league appearances and goals

Njabulo Ndlovu (born 29 December 1994) is a Swazi footballer who plays for Premier League of Eswatini club Green Mamba.

== International career ==
=== International goals ===
Scores and results list eSwatini's goal tally first.

No	Date	Venue	Opponent	Score	Result	Competition
1.	13 June 2016	Sam Nujoma Stadium, Windhoek, Namibia	Seychelles	3–0	4–0	2016 COSAFA Cup
