= Dumisa Mahlalela =

Swazi football manager

Personal information
- Place of birth: Swaziland
- Date of death: 8 July 2012
- Place of death: Swaziland

Managerial career
- Years: Team
- 1992–1993: Swaziland
- 2001–2002: Swaziland
- 2004: Swaziland
- 2010: Hub Sundowns F.C
- 20xx–2012: Moneni Pirates F.C.

Dumisa 'Dodge' Mahlalela was a Swazi professional football manager.

== Career ==
Mahlalela had first been Swaziland's coach for three matches in 1992 and 1993. Since 2001 he coached the Swaziland national football team. Mahlalela was removed in December 2002, after two years at the helm, as officials said he was suffering from depression and had attempted to commit suicide. In April 2004 he was back to the national team.

July 8, 2012, died in Mbabane Government Hospital.
