= Obed Mlotsa =

Swazi football manager

Personal information
- Place of birth: Swaziland

Managerial career
- Years: Team
- 2011: Swaziland

Obed 'Foreman Power' Mlotsa is a Swazi professional football manager.

== Career ==
In 2011, he coached the Swaziland national football team.
