= Anthony Mdluli =

Swazi football manager

Personal information
- Full name: Mphindwa Anthony Mdluli
- Place of birth: Swaziland

Team information
- Current team: Manzini Sea Birds (manager)

Managerial career
- Years: Team
- 2015: Swaziland U17
- 2016: Manzini Wanderers
- 2017: Eswatini
- 2018: Eswatini (caretaker)
- 2019–: Manzini Sea Birds

Mphindwa Anthony Mdluli is a Swazi football manager, currently managing Manzini Sea Birds.

== Managerial career ==
In 2015, it was announced Mdluli would manage the Swaziland U17 squad at the 2015 COSSASA Games in Bulawayo, Zimbabwe.

In August 2016, Mdluli was named head coach of Manzini Wanderers.

In 2017, Mdluli was appointed manager of Swaziland. He was replaced by Pieter de Jongh, before returning to the job in March 2018 as a caretaker. He was replaced by Kosta Papić in December 2018.

In January 2019, Mdluli was appointed manager of Manzini Sea Birds.
