= Felix Badenhorst =

Liswati footballer

Personal information
- Full name: Felix Gerson Badenhorst
- Date of birth: 12 June 1989 (age 37)
- Place of birth: Hlatikulu, Swaziland
- Height: 1.89 m (6 ft 2 in)
- Position: Attacking midfielder

Team information
- Current team: Royal Leopards

Youth career
- Manzini Wanderers

Senior career*
Years	Team	Apps	(Gls)
2007–2009	Manzini Wanderers	89	(67)
2008	→ Intsha Sporting (loan)	14	(10)
2009–2011	Jomo Cosmos	80	(43)
2012	→ Manzini Wanderers (loan)		
2012–2016	Manzini Wanderers		
2016–2017	Vita Club		
2017–2018	Mbabane Swallows		
2018–2020	Mbombela United		
2020–2021	TS Galaxy		
2021–2024	Mbabane Swallows		(20)
2024	Royal Leopards		(14)

International career^{‡}
2008–2021	Eswatini	43	(15)
- * Club domestic league appearances and goals ‡ National team caps and goals as of 14 July 2023

Felix Gerson Badenhorst (born 12 June 1989) is a Liswati professional footballer who currently plays for Royal Leopards F.C. of the Premier League of Eswatini.

== Club career ==
The midfielder began his career with Manzini Wanderers and was in 2008 a half year on loan with South African club Intsha Sporting. He later played for Jomo Cosmos and on loan for Manzini Wanderers. Before joining AS Vita Club he was a Mbabane Swallows F.C. player.

In October 2020 Badenhorst joined TS Galaxy of the South African Premier Soccer League from Mbombela United.

== International career ==
Badenhorst has been a member of the Eswatini national football team since 2008.

=== International goals ===
As of match played 14 July 2021. Swaziland score listed first, score column indicates score after each Badenhorst goal.

No.	Date	Venue	Opponent	Score	Result	Competition
1	23 May 2008	Trade Fair Ground, Manzini, Swaziland	Lesotho	1–1	1–1	Friendly
2	10 September 2014	Sam Nujoma Stadium, Windhoek, Namibia	Namibia	1–1	1–1	Friendly
3	25 March 2015	Somhlolo National Stadium, Lobamba, Swaziland	South Africa	1–2	1–3	Friendly
4	6 September 2015	Somhlolo National Stadium, Lobamba, Swaziland	Malawi	1–1	2–2	2017 Africa Cup of Nations qualification
5	25 March 2016	Somhlolo National Stadium, Lobamba, Swaziland	Zimbabwe	1–0	1–1	2017 Africa Cup of Nations qualification
6	11 June 2016	Sam Nujoma Stadium, Windhoek, Namibia	Zimbabwe	1–0	2–2	2016 COSAFA Cup
7	11 June 2016	Sam Nujoma Stadium, Windhoek, Namibia	Zimbabwe	2–1	2–2	2016 COSAFA Cup
8	13 June 2016	Sam Nujoma Stadium, Windhoek, Namibia	Seychelles	1–0	4–0	2016 COSAFA Cup
9	13 June 2016	Sam Nujoma Stadium, Windhoek, Namibia	Seychelles	2–0	4–0	2016 COSAFA Cup
10	15 June 2016	Independence Stadium, Windhoek, Namibia	Madagascar	1–0	1–0	2016 COSAFA Cup
11	2 July 2017	Royal Bafokeng Stadium, Phokeng, South Africa	Zimbabwe	1–1	1–2	2017 COSAFA Cup
12	25 May 2019	King Zwelithini Stadium, Umlazi, South Africa	Mauritius	2–2	2–2	2019 COSAFA Cup
13	27 May 2019	King Zwelithini Stadium, Umlazi, South Africa	Comoros	2–1	2–2	2019 COSAFA Cup
14	26 March 2021	Mavuso Sports Centre, Manzini, Eswatini	Guinea-Bissau	1–1	1–3	2021 Africa Cup of Nations qualification
15	6 July 2021	Nelson Mandela Bay Stadium, Port Elizabeth, South Africa	Lesotho	1–0	3–1	2021 COSAFA Cup
