= Sandile =

Sandile may refer to

- Sandile (name)
- Sandile (surname)
- Sandile (Pokémon), a fifth-generation Pokémon species
- Sandile Dam in South Africa
- Sandile Decoration in Ciskei, South Africa
- Sandile Medal in Ciskei, South Africa
