= Guy-Michel Landel =

Guinean footballer (born 1990)

Personal information
- Full name: Guy Lucien Michel Landel
- Date of birth: 7 July 1990 (age 36)
- Place of birth: Conakry, Guinea
- Height: 1.72 m (5 ft 8 in)
- Position: Midfielder

Team information
- Current team: Cihangir GSK
- Number: 20

Senior career*
Years	Team	Apps	(Gls)
2008–2013	Le Mans	13	(1)
2013–2015	Orduspor	48	(10)
2015–2017	Gençlerbirliği	47	(3)
2017–2018	Alanyaspor	5	(0)
2018–2020	Giresunspor	57	(6)
2020–2022	Bandırmaspor	58	(7)
2022–2023	Boluspor	37	(6)
2024	Şanlıurfaspor	21	(0)
2024–	Cihangir GSK		

International career^{‡}
2013–2017	Guinea	15	(2)
- * Club domestic league appearances and goals as of 31 August 2024 ‡ National team caps and goals as of 21 January 2018

Guy Lucien Michel Landel (born 7 July 1990) is a Guinean footballer who plays as a midfielder for Northern Cypriot club Cihangir GSK.

== International career ==
Landel made his international debut for Guinea on 16 June 2013 against Zimbabwe. He scored his first goal for the national team on 25 May 2014 in a friendly match against Mali.

== Career statistics ==
=== International goals ===
Scores and results list Guinea's goal tally first.

#	Date	Venue	Opponent	Score	Result	Competition
1.	25 May 2014	Stade Olympique Yves-du-Manoir, Colombes, France	Mali	1–1	2–1	Friendly
2.	4 September 2016	Stade du 28 Septembre, Conakry, Guinea	Zimbabwe	1–0	1–0	2017 Africa Cup of Nations qualification
