= Dominic Kunene =

Swazi football manager

Personal information
- Place of birth: Swaziland

Team information
- Current team: Eswatini (manager)

Managerial career
- Years: Team
- 2014: Manzini Sundowns
- 2015–2020: Young Buffaloes
- 2019: Eswatini U20
- 2020–2022: Eswatini
- 2023–2024: Eswatini
- 2026–: Eswatini (caretaker)

Dominic Kunene is a Swazi football manager, currently managing Eswatini.

== Managerial career ==
In March 2014, Kunene was named manager of Manzini Sundowns until the end of the Swazi Premier League season. In 2015, Kunene was appointed manager of Young Buffaloes. During his tenure at the club, Kunene lead the club to three consecutive Swazi Cup victories. In January 2020, Kunene was appointed manager of the Eswatini national football team.
