= Angula da Costa =

Namibian footballer

Personal information
- Date of birth: 17 March 1987 (age 39)

Senior career*
Years	Team	Apps	(Gls)
2014–2017	Black Africa S.C.	17	(0)
Total		17	(0)

International career
2013–2014	Namibia MNT	7	(0)
- * Club domestic league appearances and goals

Angula da Costa (born 17 March 1987) is a Namibian football defender with Black Africa S.C. and the Namibia national football team. He first appeared in an international match for Namibia in November 2011 and has appeared in 5 matches total for his national squad.
