= Sandile Sibande =

South African soccer player

Personal information
- Full name: Sandile Stanley Sibande
- Date of birth: 21 September 1987 (age 39)
- Place of birth: Nelspruit, South Africa
- Positions: Defensive midfielder; central midfielder

Youth career
- Stone Breakers
- Juventus (South Africa)
- School of Excellence
- Bidvest Wits

Senior career*
Years	Team	Apps	(Gls)
2007–2015	Bidvest Wits	83	(0)
2014	Polokwane City (loan)	11	(0)
2014–2015	Moroka Swallows (loan)	15	(0)
- * Club domestic league appearances and goals

Sandile Sibande (born 27 September 1987) is a South African soccer player who played as a midfielder.

== Sandile Sibande was born in Matsulu, A township in Nelspruit, Mpumalanga ==
Sibande was born in Nelspruit.
