= Harris Bulunga =

Swazi football manager

Harries Madze Bulunga
Personal information
- Place of birth: Swaziland (since 2018 renamed to Eswatini)

Team information
- Current team: Eswatini (manager)

Managerial career
- Years: Team
- 2013–2014: Swaziland (caretaker)
- 2014–2016: Swaziland

Harris 'Madze' Bulunga is an Eswatini professional football manager.

== Career ==
In November 2013 he became the new caretaker coach of the Swaziland national football team. Since 2014 he is a head coach of the Eswatini national football team.
