= Gift Motupa =

South African soccer player

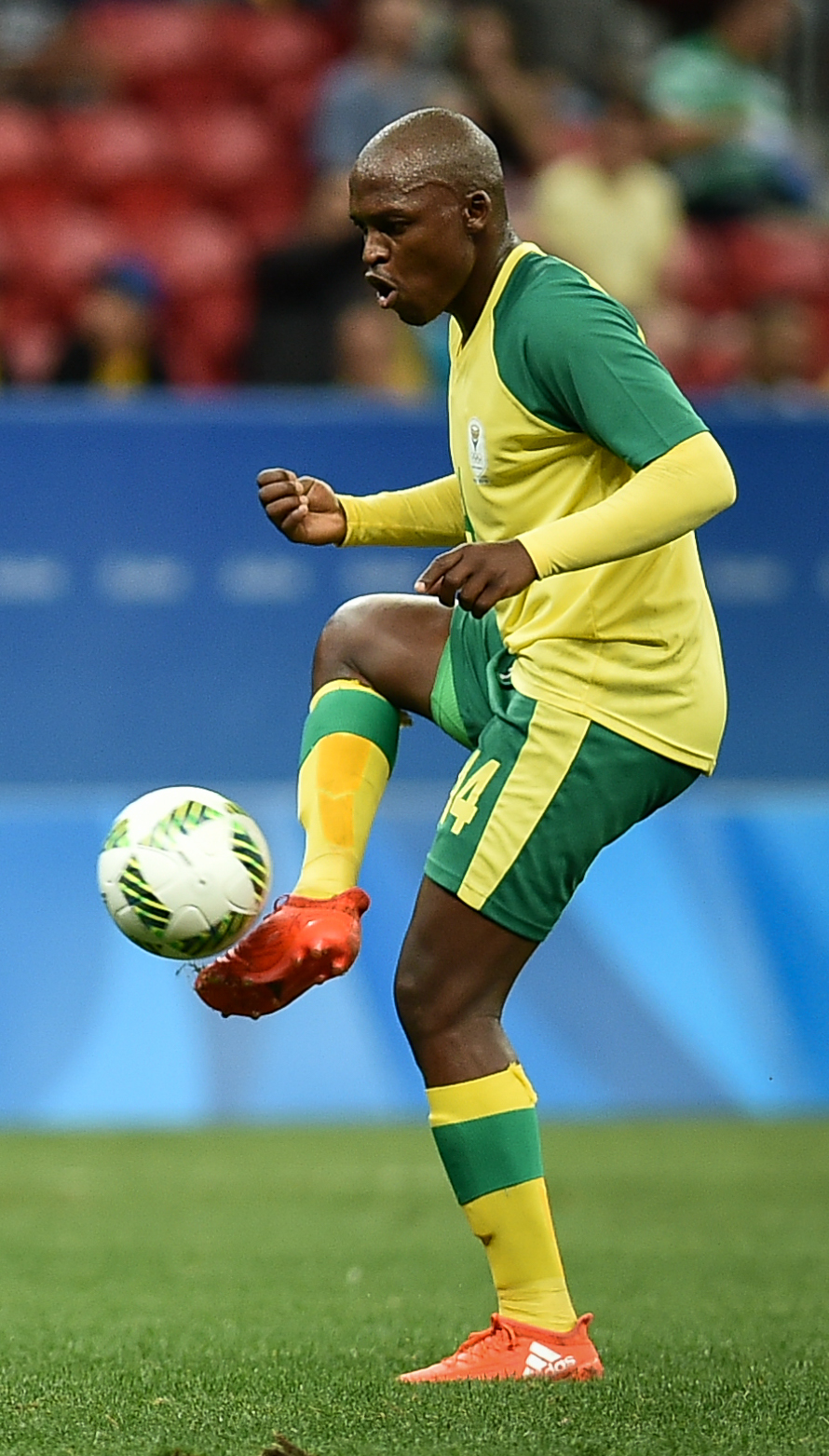

Personal information
- Full name: Gift Motupa
- Date of birth: 23 September 1994 (age 32)
- Place of birth: South Africa
- Height: 1.76 m (5 ft 9 in)
- Position: Midfielder

Team information
- Current team: Magesi
- Number: 40

Senior career*
Years	Team	Apps	(Gls)
2013–2015	Baroka	50	(18)
2015–2018	Orlando Pirates	30	(2)
2017–2018	→ Baroka (loan)	5	(3)
2018	Chippa United	0	(0)
2018–2020	Bidvest Wits	37	(14)
2020–2024	Mamelodi Sundowns	14	(1)
2024	Baroka	1	(0)
2024–	Magesi	2	(0)

International career^{‡}
2015	South Africa U23	4	(2)
2016	South Africa Olympic	3	(1)
2015–2018	South Africa	12	(5)
- * Club domestic league appearances and goals as of 1 May 2023 ‡ National team caps and goals as of 1 May 2023

Gift Motupa (born 23 September 1994) is a South African soccer player who plays as a midfielder for South African Premier Division side Magesi.

== Club career ==
Motupa started his career at Baroka before joining Orlando Pirates in 2015. He spent the 2017–18 season on loan at Baroka.

He was sold to Chippa United in May 2018, but was sold to Bidvest Wits in July 2018 without playing a single match for Chippa United.

He joined Mamelodi Sundowns on a five-year contract in September 2020.

== International career ==
=== International goals ===
Scores and results list South Africa's goal tally first.

Goal	Date	Venue	Opponent	Score	Result	Competition
1.	18 June 2016	Sam Nujoma Stadium, Windhoek, Namibia	Lesotho	1–1	1–1	Friendly
2.	25 June 2016	Sam Nujoma Stadium, Windhoek, Namibia	Botswana	1–1	3–2	Friendly
3.	25 June 2016	Sam Nujoma Stadium, Windhoek, Namibia	Botswana	3–2	3–2	Friendly
4.	15 July 2017	Francistown Stadium, Francistown, Botswana	Botswana	2–0	2–0	2018 African Nations Championship qualification
