= Wonder Nhleko =

Liswati former association footballer

Wonder Mabandla Nhleko (born 16 April 1981) is a Liswati former footballer.

== Early life ==
Nhleko started playing football at a young age and was a more individualistic player as a youth player.

== Club career ==
Nhleko is nicknamed "Samba Jive". He has been regarded as one of the most experienced players in Eswatini and played in South Africa. He has been regarded as one of the most important players of Swazi side Mbabane Swallows. He helped the club win every trophy in Swaziland and achieve a season-long unbeaten run that included the CAF Confederation Cup group stage. He has been the oldest player to play in the Swazi top flight.

== International career ==
Nhleko made his COSAFA Cup debut for Eswatini in 2002 . Altogether, he has made 45 appearances for the Eswatini national football team.

== Style of play ==
Nhleko mainly operates as a winger and is known for his speed. He has also been known for his ability to score "wonder goals".

== Post-playing career ==
Nhleko has taken managerial courses.

== Personal life ==
Nhleko has been married. He is the son of Abner Sipho Nhleko.
