= 2024–25 Abha Club season =

Abha Club
2024–25 season
- Manager: Abderrazek Chebbi
- Stadium: Prince Sultan bin Abdulaziz Sports City
- First Division League: 8th
- King's Cup: Round of 32

The 2024–25 season was the 59th season in the history of Abha Club and the first after its return to the First Division League. They also participated in the premier domestic cup, the King's Cup.

== Friendlies ==
=== Pre-season ===
| 9 August 2024 Friendly | Etoile SS (Tunisia) | 1–0 | (Saudi Arabia) Abha | Sousse, Tunisia |
| 17:00 UTC+1 | Ghedamsi | | | Stadium: Al-Muradi Stadium, Kantaoui Club |

== Competitions ==
=== Overall record ===
| Competition | First match | Last match | Starting round | Final position | Record | | | | | | | |
| Competition | First match | Last match | Starting round | Final position | Pld | W | D | L | GF | GA | GD | Win % |
|---|---|---|---|---|---|---|---|---|---|---|---|---|
| First Division League | 21 August 2024 | 18 May 2025 | Matchday 1 | 8th | 34 | 12 | 12 | 10 | 46 | 48 | −2 | 35.29 |
| King's Cup | 25 September 2024 | | Round of 32 | Round of 32 | 1 | 0 | 0 | 1 | 2 | 3 | −1 | 0.00 |
| Total | | | | | 35 | 12 | 12 | 11 | 48 | 51 | −3 | 34.29 |

Last updated: 18 May 2025
Source: Competitions

=== First Division League ===
==== League table ====
| Pos | Team | Pld | W | D | L | GF | GA | GD | Pts | Promotion, qualification or relegation |
|---|---|---|---|---|---|---|---|---|---|---|
| 6 | Al-Bukiryah | 34 | 17 | 7 | 10 | 46 | 24 | +22 | 58 (Note: Al-Adalah finished ahead of Al-Bukiryah on head-to-head points: Al-Adalah: 6 pts, Al-Bukiryah: 0 pts (Al-Adalah 2–0 Al-Bukiryah, Al-Bukiryah 0–2 Al-Adalah).) | Qualification for the promotion play-offs |
| 7 | Al-Tai | 34 | 16 | 8 | 10 | 50 | 37 | +13 | 56 | Qualification for the promotion play-offs |
| 8 | Abha | 34 | 12 | 12 | 10 | 46 | 48 | −2 | 48 | |
| 9 | Al-Zulfi | 34 | 10 | 14 | 10 | 36 | 36 | 0 | 44 | |
| 10 | Jeddah | 34 | 10 | 13 | 11 | 32 | 39 | −7 | 43 | |

Source: goalzz.com
Rules for classification: 1) Points; 2) Head-to-head points; 3) Head-to-head goal difference; 4) Total goal difference; 5) Total goals scored; 6) Fair-play points
(Note: Head-to-head record is used only after all the matches between the teams in question have been played).

==== Results summary ====
| Overall | | | | | | | | Home | | | | | | Away | | | | | |
| Pld | W | D | L | GF | GA | GD | Pts | W | D | L | GF | GA | GD | W | D | L | GF | GA | GD |
|---|---|---|---|---|---|---|---|---|---|---|---|---|---|---|---|---|---|---|---|
| 1 | 0 | 0 | 1 | 0 | 2 | −2 | 0 | 0 | 0 | 1 | 0 | 2 | −2 | 0 | 0 | 0 | 0 | 0 | 0 |

==== Results by round ====
| Round | 1 | 2 |
|---|---|---|
| Ground | H | A |
| Result | L | |
| Position | 16 | |

A = Away; H = Home; W = Win; D = Draw; L = Loss

==== Matches ====
The match schedule was released on 19 July 2024.

| 21 August 2024 1 | Abha | 0–2 | Neom | Abha |
| 19:10 UTC+3 | | | | Stadium: Prince Sultan bin Abdulaziz Sports City |

| 27 August 2024 2 | Al-Arabi | 1–2 | Abha | Unaizah |
| 19:10 UTC+3 | | | | Stadium: Department of Education Stadium |

| 1 September 2024 3 | Abha | 2–1 | Ohod |

| 16 September 2024 4 | Al Bukayriyah | 0–1 | Abha |

| 1 October 2024 5 | Abha | 3–1 | Al Faisaly |

| 6 October 2024 6 | Al Batin | 3–2 | Abha |

| 23 October 2024 7 | Al-Hazem | 4–1 | Abha |

| 30 October 2024 8 | Abha | 2–2 | Jeddah |

| 5 November 2024 9 | Al Jubail | 0–1 | Abha |

| 10 November 2024 10 | Abha | 3–3 | Al Adalah |

| 27 November 2024 11 | Al-Zulfi | 3–0 | Abha |

| 4 December 2024 12 | Abha | 1–0 | Al-Safa |

| 11 December 2024 13 | Al-Jandal | 2–0 | Abha |

| 18 December 2024 14 | Abha | 1–1 | Al-Jabalain |

| 6 January 2025 15 | Al-Najma | 3–0 | Abha |

| 12 January 2025 16 | Al-Tai | 2–1 | Abha |

| 17 January 2025 17 | Abha | 0–0 | Al-Ain |

| 21 January 2025 18 | Neom | 2–2 | Abha |

| 28 January 2025 19 | Abha | 1–0 | Al-Arabi |

| 3 February 2025 20 | Ohod | 0–1 | Abha |

| 11 February 2025 21 | Abha | 1–3 | Al Bukayriyah |

| 18 February 2025 22 | Al Faisaly | 2–2 | Abha |

| 25 February 2025 23 | Abha | 2–2 | Al Batin |

| 4 March 2025 24 | Abha | 1–1 | Al-Hazem |

| 10 March 2025 25 | Jeddah | 0–0 | Abha |

| 16 March 2025 26 | Abha | 4–0 | Al Jubail |

| 4 April 2025 27 | Al Adalah | 2–3 | Abha |

| 10 April 2025 28 | Abha | 1–1 | Al-Zulfi |

| 16 April 2025 29 | Al-Safa | 2–2 | Abha |

| 23 April 2025 30 | Abha | 1–1 | Al-Jandal |

| 29 April 2025 31 | Al-Jabalain | 3–1 | Abha |

| 7 May 2025 32 | Abha | 1–0 | Al-Najma |

| 12 May 2025 33 | Abha | 0–1 | Al-Tai |

| 18 May 2025 34 | Al-Ain | 0–3 | Abha |

=== King's Cup ===
| 25 September 2024 Round of 32 | Abha | 2–3 | Al Taawoun | Abha |
| | | | | Stadium: Prince Sultan bin Abdulaziz Sports City |
