= Flamingos F.C. =

Namibian football club

Flamingo FC
- Full name: Flamingo FC
- Founded: 1986
- Ground: Unknown Stadium, Rehoboth
- Manager: Alex Strauss
- League: Namibia Premier League
Home colours

Flamingos FC is a Namibian football club from Rehoboth. They play in the country's highest division, the Namibia Premier League.

The team was founded in 1986 by brothers Tossy and Alex Strauss. The club were promoted to the First Division Southern Stream from the Hardap Regional Division in 2014. Flamingos won promotion to the top-flight Namibia Premier League in their very first season in the second tier.

Flamingo Promoted To The Top Flight.

== League participations ==
- Namibia Premier League: 2015–
- Namibia First Division: 2014–15
- Regional Leagues 1986–2014
