= Ibrahima Diédhiou =

Senegalese footballer (born 1994)

Personal information
- Date of birth: 13 October 1994 (age 32)
- Place of birth: Tambacounda, Senegal
- Height: 1.90 m (6 ft 3 in)
- Position: Defender

Team information
- Current team: Vineuil

Senior career*
Years	Team	Apps	(Gls)
2012–2017	Eupen	18	(0)
2018–2020	Beauvais	31	(1)
2021–2024	Feignies Aulnoye	47	(2)
2024–	Vineuil	9	(0)

International career^{‡}
2014	Senegal	1	(0)
2015	Senegal U23	3	(1)
- * Club domestic league appearances and goals as of 7 December 2024 ‡ National team caps and goals as of 1 January 2019

Ibrahima Diédhiou (born 13 October 1994) is a Senegalese international footballer who plays as a defender for French Championnat National 3 club Vineuil.

== Career ==
Diédhiou has played club football for Eupen. Diédhiou was released by Eupen after the 2016–17 season, and after one year without a club, he signed for fifth-tier French amateurs AS Beauvais Oise.

Diédhiou played for Senegal U-23 at the 2015 CAF U-23 Championship. He made his senior international debut for Senegal in a friendly against Colombia on 31 May 2014.
