= Eswatini national football team =

Men's association football team

Eswatini
- Nickname: Sihlangu Semnikati (King's Shield)
- Association: Eswatini Football Association (EFA)
- Confederation: CAF (Africa)
- Sub-confederation: COSAFA (Southern Africa)
- Head coach: Dominic Kunene (caretaker)
- Captain: Mthunzi Mkhontfo
- Most caps: Sabelo Ndzinisa (78)
- Top scorer: Sabelo Ndzinisa (17)
- Home stadium: Somhlolo National Stadium
- FIFA code: SWZ
First colours	Second colours	Third colours

FIFA ranking
- Current: 164 ▲1 (7 October 2026)
- Highest: 88 (April–May 2017)
- Lowest: 190 (September–October 2012)

First international
- (United Kingdom) Swaziland 2–0 Malawi (Swaziland; 1 May 1968)

Biggest win
- Djibouti 0–6 Swaziland (Djibouti City, Djibouti; 9 October 2015)

Biggest defeat
- Egypt 10–0 Swaziland (Alexandria, Egypt; 22 March 2013)

COSAFA Cup
- Appearances: 19 (first in 1997)
- Best result: Third place (2016, 2021); Semi-finals (1999, 2002, 2003)
Medal record
COSAFA Cup
Bronze medal – third place	2016 Namibia	Team
Bronze medal – third place	2021 South Africa

The Eswatini national football team, nicknamed Sihlangu Semnikati (King's Shield), represents Eswatini, formerly known as Swaziland, in international football and is controlled by the Eswatini Football Association. It has never qualified for the World Cup or the Africa Cup of Nations finals. Eswatini's best performance in an international tournament is a third place finish in the 2016 COSAFA Cup.

On 8 June 2008, they achieved their first win in a World Cup qualifier since 1992, beating 2006 finalists Togo 2–1 on home soil. The team's best recent performance came in 2017 Africa Cup of Nations qualification where Eswatini finished second in Group L above Guinea and Malawi.

== History ==
=== Beginnings ===
The team played its first international match against Malawi, winning 2–0. For the first decade, the national team only played Malawi and Zambia, failing to register a single win from 1969 until 1984, when they beat Lesotho 3–1 in a friendly at home. Following the Lesotho win, Eswatini entered the 1986 African Cup of Nations qualifiers for the first time, losing 1–8 on aggregate to Zimbabwe. The team then entered the 1987 All-Africa Games qualifiers however they lost 2–9 on aggregate against Malawi.

The first time that Eswatini progressed past the first round of a qualifying competition was for the 1990 African Cup of Nations qualifiers, beating Tanzania 3–1 on penalties after drawing the tie 2–2. In the second round they faced Malawi who knocked them out again, 1–3 after two legs. Eswatini next entered the 1990 SADCC Tournament, advancing past the group stage on goal difference ahead of Malawi, before losing to Zimbabwe on penalties (5–3) in the semi-finals following a 4–4 draw after extra-time. In the 1992 African Cup of Nations qualifiers, Eswatini beat Zambia (2–1) during the preliminary group stage but finished in third and failed to progress.

Eswatini entered the 1994 FIFA World Cup qualifiers for the first time, but ended up in second place behind Cameroon thereby not advancing to the final round. For the 1998 World Cup first qualification round, Eswatini lost twice to Gabon (0–1 and 0–2) and were eliminated. They failed to make it past the first qualifying round for the inaugural 1997 COSAFA Cup, where they lost 0–4 to Mozambique, and in the 1998 COSAFA Cup where they lost to an own-goal in extra-time against Angola (0–1). Eswatini returned to the 2000 African Cup of Nations qualification matches after missing the previous three tournaments but they fell 2–3 against Madagascar and were eliminated. They managed to qualify for the 1999 COSAFA Cup after beating Mozambique 3–1 in the qualifiers, then beat Zimbabwe in the quarter-finals 4–3 on penalties after drawing 1–1 in regular time, with Bongani Mdluli having scored the equaliser for Eswatini in the 89th minute. In the semi-finals they lost to Namibia on penalties, 2–4.

=== 21st century ===
Eswatini were eliminated by Angola in the 2002 World Cup qualifiers, losing 1–8 on aggregate. They then lost to Kenya in the 2002 African Cup of Nations qualification round 3–5. Their next success in a competition came in the 2002 COSAFA Cup where they qualified ahead of Namibia (2–1) and beat Zimbabwe (2–0) to advance to the semis. There they lost to South Africa (1–4) who would go on to win the tournament. In the 2004 AFCON qualifiers, Eswatini finished third in their group, two points behind Libya and three behind DR Congo therefore missing out on qualification.

In the following tournaments, Eswatini failed to progress past the first qualifying round. They finished bottom of their qualifying groups until 2017 Africa Cup of Nations qualification where they finished in second on goal-difference ahead of Guinea but were three points off of qualifying, behind Zimbabwe. In the 2018 World Cup qualifying, Eswatini thrashed Djibouti 8–1 over two legs, but were beaten 0–2 by Nigeria to end their hopes of qualification.

== Results and fixtures ==
The following is a list of match results in the last 12 months, as well as any future matches that have been scheduled.

Win Draw Loss Fixture

=== 2026 ===
25 March 2027 Africa Cup of Nations qualification preliminary round	Eritrea	2–0	Eswatini	Meknes, Morocco
17:00 UTC+1	Eyob-Abraha 81'; Sulieman 90+4'	Report		Stadium: Stade d'Honneur; Referee: Moussa Diou (Mauritania)

31 March 2027 Africa Cup of Nations qualification preliminary round	Eswatini	1–2	Eritrea	Lobamba, Eswatini
16:00 UTC+2	Figuareido 90+6'	Report	Sulieman 50', 59'	Stadium: Somhlolo National Stadium; Referee: Josefa Aurelio (São Tomé and Príncipe)

12 November Friendly	Malta	1-1	Eswatini	Ta' Qali, Malta
18:30 UTC+1		Report		Stadium: National Stadium

15 November 2026 Friendly	Suriname	4-0	Eswatini	's-Hertogenbosch, Netherlands
				Stadium: De Vliert

== Coaches ==
Caretakers are listed in italics.

- (Romania) Ted Dumitru (1983–85)
- (Eswatini) Dumisa Mahlalela (1992–93)
- (Eswatini) Scara Thindwa (1996)
- (Zambia) Jan Simulambo (1997)
- (Zambia) Francis Banda (1998–2000)
- (Eswatini) Dumisa Mahlalela (2001–02)
- (Eswatini) Mandla Dlamini (2003)
- (Zambia) Francis Banda (2003)
- (Germany) Werner Bicklehaput (2003)
- (Eswatini) Dumisa Mahlalela (2004)
- (Zambia) Francis Banda (2005)
- (Belgium) Jan Van Winckel (2006)
- (Egypt) Ayman El Yamani (2006–07)
- (Eswatini) Martin Chabangu (2007)
- (Switzerland) Raoul Savoy (2007–08)
- (South Africa) Ephraim Mashaba (2008–10)
- (Eswatini) Musa Zwane (2010–11)
- (Eswatini) Obed Mlotsa (2011)
- (Eswatini) Caleb Ngwenya (2011–12)
- (Belgium) Valere Billen (2012–13)
- (Eswatini) Harris Bulunga (2013–14)
- (Eswatini) Harris Bulunga (2014–16)
- (Eswatini) Anthony Mdluli (2017)
- (Netherlands) Hendrik Pieter de Jongh (2017–18)
- (Eswatini) Anthony Mdluli (2018)
- (Serbia) Kosta Papić (2018–19)
- (Eswatini) Dominic Kunene (2020–22)
- (Eswatini) Dominic Kunene (2023–24)
- (Croatia) Zdravko Logarušić (2024–25)
- (Eswatini) Sifiso Ntibane (2024–26)
- (Eswatini) Dominic Kunene (2026–)

== Players ==
=== Current squad ===
The following players were called up for the 2025 COSAFA Cup to be played 4–15 June 2025.

Caps and goals correct as of 9 June 2025, after the match against Madagascar

No.	Pos.	Player	Date of birth (age)	Caps	Goals	Club
1	GK	Xolani Gama	20 October 1999 (age 27)	11	0	(Eswatini Football Association) Green Mamba
16	GK	Bongiswa Dlamini	4 April 2001 (age 25)	1	0	(Eswatini Football Association) Mbabane Swallows
21	GK	Khanyakwezwe Shabalala	23 September 1993 (age 33)	5	0	(Eswatini Football Association) Nsingizini Hotspurs
2	DF	Siphephelo Newman Philiso	11 November 2003 (age 23)	6	0	(Eswatini Football Association) Mbabane Swallows
3	DF	Kwakhe Thwala	4 April 2002 (age 24)	38	1	(Eswatini Football Association) Nsingizini Hotspurs
5	DF	Thando Langa	25 December 1999 (age 26)	2	0	(Eswatini Football Association) Mbabane Highlanders
12	DF	Gift Gamedze	7 September 1999 (age 27)	9	0	(Eswatini Football Association) Royal Leopard
22	DF	Simanga Masangane	9 May 1997 (age 29)	10	0	(Eswatini Football Association) Royal Leopard
4	MF	Neliswa Senzo Dlamini	28 December 2002 (age 23)	34	0	(Eswatini Football Association) Nsingizini Hotspurs
6	MF	Innocent Dlamini	8 December 1998 (age 27)	5	0	(Eswatini Football Association) Young Buffaloes
7	MF	Felix Badenhorst	15 June 1989 (age 37)	47	15	(Eswatini Football Association) Royal Leopard
9	MF	Philani Mkhontfo	4 April 1995 (age 31)	29	4	(Eswatini Football Association) Manzini Sea Birds
10	MF	Banele Sikhondze	28 June 1993 (age 33)	12	0	(Tanzania Football Federation) Tabora United
11	MF	Andy Junior Magagula	12 January 1995 (age 31)	25	5	(Eswatini Football Association) Royal Leopard
13	MF	Mpendulo Lungelo Tfomo	17 March 2000 (age 26)	3	0	(Eswatini Football Association) Manzini Sea Birdsa
14	MF	Mzwandile Mabelesa	21 April 1993 (age 33)	41	0	(Eswatini Football Association) Royal Leopard
23	MF	Njabulo Ndlovu	29 December 1994 (age 31)	37	1	(Eswatini Football Association) Green Mamba
24	MF	Mxolisi Mkhontfo	8 March 1993 (age 33)	21	1	(Botswana Football Association) Jwaneng Galaxy
15	FW	Mayibongwe Mabuza	20 August 1993 (age 33)	2	1	(Eswatini Football Association) Manzini Sea Birds
17	FW	Justice Figuareido	28 July 1998 (age 28)	22	1	(South African Football Association) Richards Bay
18	FW	Sambulo Simelane	7 June 2001 (age 25)	6	1	(Eswatini Football Association) Nsingizini Hotspurs
20	FW	Sabelo Ndzinisa	31 July 1991 (age 35)	77	17	(Eswatini Football Association) Green Mamba
19	FW	Fanelo Mamba	29 October 2001 (age 25)	46	6	(Eswatini Football Association) Young Buffaloes
8	FW	Siyabonga Mthokozisi Gwebu	30 June 1994 (age 32)	8	0	(Eswatini Football Association) Manzini Sea Birds

=== Recent call-ups ===
The following players were called up for Eswatini in the last 12 months.

Pos.	Player	Date of birth (age)	Caps	Goals	Club	Latest call-up

== Player records ==
As of 11 June 2025
Players in bold are still active with Eswatini.

=== Most appearances ===
Rank	Player	Caps	Goals	Career
1	**Sabelo Ndzinisa**	78	17	2012–present
2	Tony Tsabedze	71	8	2003–2018
3	**Sifiso Matse**	58	5	2017–present
4	Mxolisi Mthethwa	52	3	1998–2010
5	**Lindo Mkhonta**	48	1	2018–present
5	Wonder Nhleko	48	5	2001–2018
5	**Felix Badenhorst**	48	15	2008–present
8	**Fanelo Mamba**	46	6	2018–present
9	Machawe Dlamini	44	1	2011–2019
9	**Sandile Gamedze**	44	8	2018–present

=== Top goalscorers ===
Rank	Player	Goals	Caps	Ratio	Career
1	**Sabelo Ndzinisa**	17	78	0.22	2012–present
2	**Felix Badenhorst**	15	48	0.31	2008–present
3	Mfanzile Dlamini	9	35	0.26	1998–2009
3	Siza Dlamini	9	39	0.23	1997–2010
5	**Sandile Gamedze**	8	44	0.18	2018–present
5	Tony Tsabedze	8	71	0.11	2003–2018
7	**Fanelo Mamba**	6	46	0.13	2018–present
8	Wonder Nhleko	5	48	0.1	2001–2018
8	**Sifiso Matse**	5	58	0.09	2017–present
10	Sidumo Shongwe	4	8	0.5	2011–2014
10	Sandile Hlatjwako	4	15	0.27	2014–2017
10	**Junior Magagula**	4	24	0.17	2019–present
10	**Philani Mkhontfo**	4	28	0.14	2022–present

== Competitive record ==
=== FIFA World Cup ===
Winners Runners-up Third place

FIFA World Cup record										Qualification record						
Year	Host	Round	Pld	W	D	L	GF	GA	Squad	Pos.	Pld	W	D	L	GF	GA
1930 to 1966		Part of the United Kingdom								Part of the United Kingdom						
as Swaziland										as Swaziland						
1970 to 1978		Not a FIFA member								Not a FIFA member						
1982 to 1990		Did not enter								Did not enter						
1994	United States	Did not qualify								2nd	3	1	1	1	1	5
1998	France	Did not qualify								—	2	0	0	2	0	3
2002	Japan; South Korea	Did not qualify								—	2	0	0	2	1	8
2006	Germany	Did not qualify								—	2	0	1	1	1	4
2010	South Africa	Did not qualify								3rd	4	1	1	2	2	8
2014	Brazil	Did not qualify								—	2	0	0	2	2	8
2018	Russia	Did not qualify								—	4	2	1	1	8	3
as Eswatini										as Eswatini						
2022	Qatar	Did not qualify								—	2	0	1	1	1	2
2026	Canada; Mexico; United States	Did not qualify								6th	10	0	3	7	6	19
2030	Morocco; Portugal; Spain	To be determined								To be determined						
Total		Never qualified	0	0	0	0	0	0	—	0/9	31	4	8	19	22	60

=== Africa Cup of Nations ===
Winners Runners-up Third place

Africa Cup of Nations record										Qualification record						
Year	Host	Round	Pld	W	D	L	GF	GA	Squad	Pos.	Pld	W	D	L	GF	GA
1957 to 1968		Part of the United Kingdom								Part of the United Kingdom						
as Swaziland										as Swaziland						
1970 to 1976		Not a CAF member								Not a CAF member						
1978 to 1982		Did not enter								Did not enter						
1984	Ivory Coast	Withdrew								Withdrew						
1986	Egypt	Did not qualify								—	2	0	0	2	1	8
1988	Morocco	Withdrew								Withdrew						
1990	Algeria	Did not qualify								—	4	0	3	1	3	5
1992	Senegal	Did not qualify								3rd	5	1	2	2	4	9
1994	Tunisia	Did not enter								Did not enter						
1996	South Africa	Withdrew								Withdrew						
1998	Burkina Faso	Did not enter								Did not enter						
2000	Ghana; Nigeria	Did not qualify								—	2	0	1	1	2	3
2002	Mali	Did not qualify								—	2	1	0	1	3	5
2004	Tunisia	Did not qualify								3rd	6	2	2	2	8	12
2006	Egypt	Did not qualify								—	2	0	1	1	1	4
2008	Ghana	Did not qualify								4th	6	0	3	3	0	7
2010	Angola	Did not qualify								3rd	4	1	1	2	2	8
2012	Equatorial Guinea; Guinea	Did not qualify								4th	6	0	0	6	2	14
2013	South Africa	Withdrew								Withdrew						
2015	Equatorial Guinea	Did not qualify								—	2	0	1	1	1	2
2017	Gabon	Did not qualify								2nd	6	2	2	2	5	5
as Eswatini										as Eswatini						
2019	Egypt	Did not qualify								4th	6	0	1	5	2	14
2021	Cameroon	Did not qualify								4th	6	0	2	4	3	13
2023	Ivory Coast	Did not qualify								4th	8	2	3	3	8	9
2025	Morocco	Did not qualify								4th	8	1	3	4	7	15
2027	Kenya; Tanzania; Uganda	To be determined								To be determined						
Total		Never qualified	0	0	0	0	0	0	—	0/16	75	10	25	40	52	133

=== COSAFA Cup ===
Winners Runners-up Third place

COSAFA Cup record										Qualification record						
Year	Host	Round	Pld	W	D	L	GF	GA	Squad	Pos.	Pld	W	D	L	GF	GA
as Swaziland										as Swaziland						
1997		Did not qualify								—	1	0	0	1	0	4
1998		Did not qualify								—	1	0	0	1	0	1
1999		Semi-finals	2	0	2	0	2	2	Squad	—	1	1	0	0	3	1
2000		Quarter-finals	1	0	0	1	0	2	Squad	No qualification						
2001		Quarter-finals	2	0	1	1	1	2	Squad	No qualification						
2002		Semi-finals	3	2	0	1	5	5	Squad	No qualification						
2003		Quarter-finals	2	1	0	1	2	2	Squad	No qualification						
2004		Quarter-finals	1	0	0	1	0	5	Squad	No qualification						
2005		Group stage	1	0	0	1	0	3	Squad	No qualification						
2006		Group stage	2	1	0	1	2	1	Squad	No qualification						
2007		Group stage	2	1	1	0	1	0	Squad	No qualification						
2008	South Africa	Group stage	3	1	2	0	3	2	Squad	No qualification						
2009	Zimbabwe	Group stage	3	2	0	1	5	2	Squad	No qualification						
2013	Zambia	Group stage	3	0	1	2	0	4	Squad	No qualification						
2015	South Africa	Group stage	3	2	1	0	4	1	Squad	No qualification						
2016	Namibia	Third place	6	3	2	1	9	7	Squad	No qualification						
2017	South Africa	Semi-finals	2	1	0	1	2	2	Squad	No qualification						
2018	South Africa	Quarter-finals	2	0	0	2	0	3	Squad	No qualification						
as Eswatini										as Eswatini						
2019	South Africa	Group stage	2	0	2	0	4	4	Squad	No qualification						
2021	South Africa	Third place	6	2	3	1	8	6	Squad	No qualification						
2022	South Africa	Quarter-finals	5	2	2	1	7	4	Squad	No qualification						
2023	South Africa	Group stage	3	1	0	2	3	4	Squad	No qualification						
2024	South Africa	Group stage	3	0	2	1	0	1	Squad	No qualification						
2025	South Africa	Group stage	2	0	1	1	2	3	Squad	No qualification						
Total		Third place	59	19	20	20	60	65	—	1/3	3	1	0	2	3	6

== Honours ==
=== Regional ===
- COSAFA Cup
  - (bronze) Third place (2): 2016, 2021
