= Sam Nujoma Stadium =

Football stadium in Windhoek, Namibia

Coordinates: 22°30′57″S 17°03′38″E

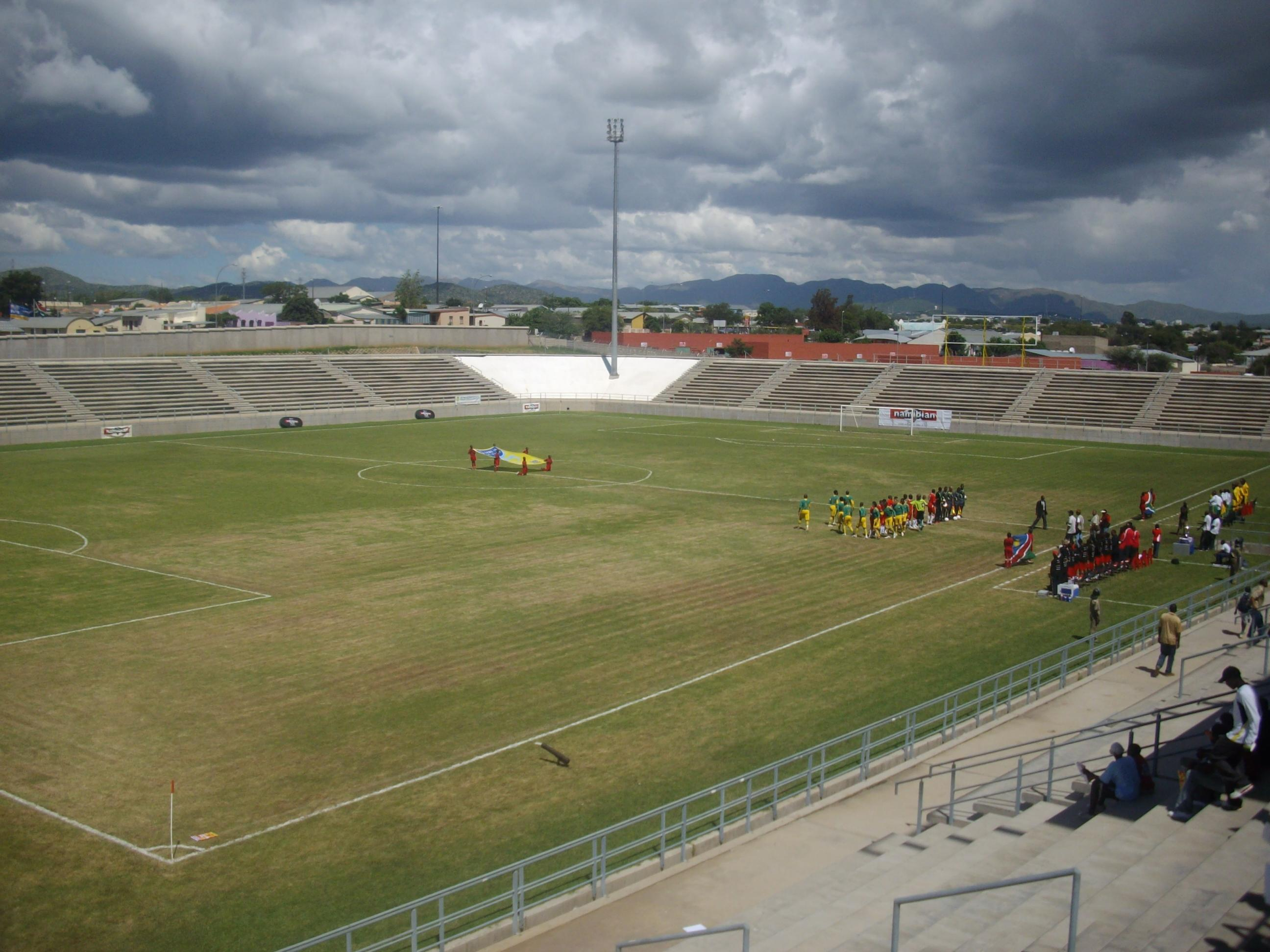
View of Sam Nujoma Stadium before a Namibia and South Africa U-20 game in March 2008

Sam Nujoma Stadium (also called the Sam Nujoma Soccer Stadium or SNSS) is a football (soccer) stadium in Katutura, Windhoek, Namibia. The stadium holds 10,300 and was finished in 2005. It is named after the former Namibian president Sam Nujoma.

As of 2021 the stadium is not in use due to safety concerns from "structural defects". The Confederation of African Football (CAF) has decommissioned the stadium in 2021 for it being sub-standard, and no other Namibian stadium meets CAF's requirements. As a result, international games of the Namibia national football team will have to be played abroad.

== See also ==
- Independence Stadium (Namibia), the other large football stadium in Windhoek
