= Zimbabwe national football team results (2000–2019) =

This is a list of the Zimbabwe national football team results from 2000 to 2019.

== 2000s head-to-head record ==
Last match updated was against Rwanda Rwanda on 9 September 2025.

Key
Positive balance (more Wins)
Neutral balance (Wins = Losses)
Negative balance (more Losses)

Flag	Nation	P	W	D	L	Win %	From	To	GF	GA	GD
(Benin)	Benin	2	0	1	1	0.00	2025	2025	2	3	-1
(Malawi)	Malawi	21	11	6	4	52.38	2001	2022	33	19	+14
(Zambia)	Zambia	24	8	9	7	33.33	2002	2024	26	20	+6
(Lesotho)	Lesotho	20	10	7	3	50.00	2000	2024	36	22	+14
(Botswana) Ô	Botswana	17	8	6	3	47.06	2003	2023	15	9	+6
(South Africa)	South Africa	14	5	2	7	35.71	2000	2025	9	18	-9
(Mozambique)	Mozambique	11	5	4	2	45.45	2005	2025	16	4	+12
(Angola)	Angola	10	4	2	4	40.00	2001	2018	11	10	+1
(Ethiopia)	Ethiopia	2	0	1	1	0.00	2021	2021	1	2	-1
(Eswatini)	Swaziland	8	5	2	1	62.50	2001	2017	18	5	+13
(Namibia)	Namibia	11	5	0	6	45.45	2000	2024	17	19	-2
(Seychelles)	Seychelles	7	6	0	1	85.71	2000	2017	22	3	+19
(Mali)	Mali	7	3	1	3	42.86	2002	2021	5	5	0
(Tanzania)	Tanzania	6	2	3	1	33.33	2009	2016	7	4	+3
(Rwanda)	Rwanda	8	2	1	5	25.00	2000	2025	6	10	-4
(Guinea)	Guinea	7	1	3	3	14.29	2008	2022	3	5	-2
(Uganda)	Uganda	6	2	3	1	33.33	2004	2019	5	2	+3
(Egypt)	Egypt	6	0	0	6	0.00	2004	2019	4	13	-9
(Mauritius)	Mauritius	7	5	2	0	71.43	2009	2025	16	2	+14
(Burkina Faso)	Burkina Faso	6	3	1	2	50.00	2001	2025	6	7	-1
(Algeria)	Algeria	6	1	4	1	16.67	2004	2020	10	11	-1
(Morocco)	Morocco	4	0	2	2	0.00	2006	2014	1	4	-3
(Nigeria)	Nigeria	7	0	3	4	0.00	2004	2024	3	13	-10
(Liberia)	Liberia	4	2	1	1	50.00	2010	2018	7	2	+5
(Gabon)	Gabon	3	2	1	0	66.67	2004	2014	4	1	+3
(Niger)	Niger	1	0	1	0	0.00	2025	2025	1	1	0
(Eritrea)	Eritrea	3	2	1	0	66.67	2002	2009	3	0	+3
(Madagascar)	Madagascar	3	1	2	0	33.33	2007	2017	1	0	+1
(Eswatini)	Eswatini	2	0	0	2	0.00	2024	2024	0	4	-4
(Ghana)	Ghana	5	1	0	4	20.00	2000	2021	5	11	-6
(Central African Republic)	Central African Republic	2	2	0	0	100.00	2000	2000	4	1	+3
(Comoros)	Comoros	5	4	1	0	80.00	2015	2024	5	0	+5
(Mauritania)	Mauritania	2	1	0	1	50.00	2003	2003	4	2	+2
(Republic of the Congo)	Congo	2	1	1	0	50.00	2018	2019	3	1	+2
(Democratic Republic of the Congo)	DR Congo	5	2	1	2	40.00	2000	2019	7	10	-3
(Burundi)	Burundi	2	1	0	1	50.00	2012	2012	2	2	0
(Cameroon)	Cameroon	5	0	2	3	0.00	2004	2024	5	9	-4
(Cape Verde)	Cape Verde	2	0	1	1	0.00	2010	2011	1	2	-1
(Kenya)	Kenya	6	0	3	3	0.00	2008	2024	2	8	-6
(Senegal)	Senegal	4	0	0	4	0.00	2006	2022	1	7	-6
(Saudi Arabia)	Saudi Arabia	1	1	0	0	100.00	2001	2001	2	0	+2
(Qatar)	Qatar	1	1	0	0	100.00	2002	2002	2	0	+2
(Somalia)	Somalia	3	2	0	1	66.67	2009	2019	5	2	+3
(Djibouti)	Djibouti	1	1	0	0	100.00	2011	2011	2	0	+2
(Ivory Coast)	Ivory Coast	1	0	1	0	0.00	2016	2016	0	0	0
(Tunisia)	Tunisia	1	0	0	1	0.00	2017	2017	2	4	-2
(Bahrain)	Bahrain	1	0	0	1	0.00	2009	2009	2	5	-3
(Libya)	Libya	1	0	0	1	0.00	2014	2014	0	0	0
(Kuwait)	Kuwait	1	0	0	1	0.00	2002	2002	0	3	-3
(Brazil)	Brazil	1	0	0	1	0.00	2010	2010	0	3	-3
(Syria)	Syria	1	0	0	1	0.00	2010	2010	0	6	-6
(Sudan)	Sudan	1	0	1	0	0.00	2021	2021	0	0	0

Source: Soccerway

== 2000s ==
=== 2000 ===
5 March 2000 COSAFA Cup	Zimbabwe	2–1	Lesotho	Harare, Zimbabwe
	J. Lupahla 69'; M. Marai 89' (o.g.)	Report	M. Majara 9'	Stadium: National Sports Stadium; Referee: Kuedza Nchengwa (Botswana)

8 April 2002 FWC Q	Central African Republic	0–1	Zimbabwe	Bangui, Central African Republic
15:00 GMT		Report	P. Ndlovu 6'	Stadium: Barthélemy Boganda Stadium; Attendance: 13,000; Referee: Ladoual Hisseine (Chad)

23 April 2002 FWC Q	Zimbabwe	3–1 (agg: 4–1)	Central African Republic	Harare, Zimbabwe
15:00 GMT	N. Ncube 20'; P. Ndlovu 35'; L. Jukulile 87'	Report	L. Djim 39'	Stadium: National Sports Stadium; Attendance: 18,951; Referee: Ferdinard Gadaga (Malawi)

14 May 2000 COSAFA Cup	Zimbabwe	3–2	Namibia	Harare, Zimbabwe
	L. Petros 67', 76'; W. Mugeyi 68'	Report	C. Benjamin 79'; R. Nauseb 89'	Stadium: National Sports Stadium; Attendance: 15,000; Referee: Antonio Massango (Mozambique)

1 July 2002 AFCON Q	Seychelles	0–1	Zimbabwe	Victoria, Seychelles
		Report	Benjani 35'

9 July 2002 FWC Q	Zimbabwe	0–2 (abnd.)	South Africa	Harare, Zimbabwe
15:00 GMT		Report; Match abandoned at 0–2 on 83 minutes after crowd trouble led police to fire tear gas into the stands, causing a mass panic in which 12 people were killed. The result after 83 minutes was allowed to stand.	D. Buckley 7', 83'	Stadium: National Sports Stadium; Attendance: 60,000; Referee: Falla N'Doye (Senegal)

16 July 2002 AFCON Q	Zimbabwe	5–0 (agg: 6–0)	Seychelles	Bulawayo, Zimbabwe
		Report	L. Petros; B. Makunike; P. Ndlovu; N. Ncube

29 July 2000 COSAFA Cup	South Africa	0–1	Zimbabwe	Port Elizabeth, South Africa
		Report	K. Tembo 11'	Stadium: Boet Erasmus Stadium; Attendance: 15,000; Referee: Mangaliso Langwenywa (Swaziland)

13 August 2000 COSAFA Cup	Lesotho	0–3	Zimbabwe	Maseru, Lesotho
		Report	T. Mahlakajoe 9' (o.g.); W. Mugeyi 41'; L. Petros 52'	Stadium: Setsoto Stadium; Attendance: 25,000; Referee: Rajanand Nunkoo (Mauritius)

27 August 2000 COSAFA Cup	Zimbabwe	3–0 (agg: 6–0)	Lesotho	Bulawayo, Zimbabwe
	L. Petros 15' (pen.); R. Chisango 75'; Benjani 78'	Report		Attendance: 35,000; Referee: Robin Williams (South Africa)

3 September 2002 AFCON Q	Zimbabwe	3–2	(Democratic Republic of the Congo) DR Congo	Harare, Zimbabwe
	L. Petros 6', 73'; P. Ndlovu 22'	Report	J. Mayélé 29' (pen.); K. Wakanyenkele 67'	Stadium: National Sports Stadium; Attendance: 25,000

8 October 2002 AFCON Q	Ghana	4–1	Zimbabwe	Accra, Ghana
	S. Appiah 28'; E. Duah 42'; C. Amoah 48'; C. Akonnor 78' (pen.)	Report	Benjani 47'	Stadium: Accra Sports Stadium

30 October Friendly	Rwanda	1–0	Zimbabwe	Lusaka, Zambia
	Goal	Report

Source: Soccerway

=== 2001 ===
14 January 2002 AFCON Q	Zimbabwe	1–2	Lesotho	Bulawayo, Zimbabwe
	Benjani 21'	Report	M. Majara 40'; L. Seema 87' (pen.)	Stadium: Barbourfields Stadium; Attendance: 20,000

24 February 2002 FWC Q	Burkina Faso	1–2	Zimbabwe	Bobo-Dioulasso, Burkina Faso
15:30 GMT	M. Dagano 23'	Report	P. Ndlovu 3', 12'	Stadium: Stade Municipal; Attendance: 20,000; Referee: Chukwudi Chukwujekwu (Nigeria)

11 March 2002 FWC Q	Zimbabwe	2–0	Malawi	Harare, Zimbabwe
15:00 GMT	Benjani 45'; E. Kasinauyo 83'	Report		Stadium: National Sports Stadium; Attendance: 25,000; Referee: Ahmed Auda (Egypt)

24 March 2002 AFCON Q	Lesotho	0–1	Zimbabwe	Maseru, Lesotho
		Report	P. Ndlovu 88'	Stadium: Setsoto Stadium; Attendance: 20,000

3 June 2002 AFCON Q	Zimbabwe	1–2	Ghana	Harare, Zimbabwe
	W. Mugeyi 15'	Report	P. Owusu-Ansah 39'; I. Boakye 89'	Stadium: National Sports Stadium

17 June 2002 AFCON Q	DR Congo (Democratic Republic of the Congo)	2–1	Zimbabwe	Kinshasa, DR Congo
	M. Bafwafwa 54'; M. Seoul 55'	Report	Benjani 7'	Stadium: Stade des Martyrs

8 July 2001 COSAFA Cup	Zimbabwe	2–1	(Eswatini) Swaziland	Harare, Zimbabwe
	R. Sibanda 26'; L. Jukulile 56'		W. Nhleko 72'	Stadium: National Sports Stadium; Attendance: 15,000

5 May 2002 FWC Q	South Africa	2–1	Zimbabwe	Johannesburg, South Africa
16:00 GMT	S. Bartlett 18'; B. McCarthy 40'	Report	P. Ndlovu 53'	Stadium: FNB Stadium; Attendance: 8,619; Referee: Reda El-Beltagy (Egypt)

15 July 2002 FWC Q	Zimbabwe	1–0	Burkina Faso	Harare, Zimbabwe
15:00 GMT	B. Makunike 43'	Report		Stadium: Rufaro Stadium; Attendance: 10,000; Referee: Salah Salih (Sudan)

28 July 2002 FWC Q	Malawi	0–1	Zimbabwe	Blantyre, Malawi
15:00 GMT		Report	M. Masiku 78'	Stadium: Chichiri Stadium; Attendance: 20,000; Referee: Michel Gasingwa (Rwanda)

25 August 2001 COSAFA Cup	Malawi	0–2	Zimbabwe	Blantyre, Malawi
		Report	E. Kasinauyo 21'; M. Dube 58'	Stadium: Chichiri Stadium

16 September 2001 COSAFA Cup	Angola	0–0	Zimbabwe	Luanda, Angola
		Report		Stadium: Estádio da Cidadela; Attendance: 15,000

30 September 2001 COSAFA Cup	Zimbabwe	0–1	Angola	Harare, Zimbabwe
		Report	Flávio 87'	Stadium: National Sports Stadium; Attendance: 30,000

30 December Friendly	Saudi Arabia	0–2	Zimbabwe	Riyadh, Saudi Arabia
		Report	S. Natadro 30'; N. Katana 75'

Source: Soccerway

=== 2002 ===
5 January Friendly	Kuwait	3–0	Zimbabwe	Kuwait City, Kuwait
	B. Abdullah 23'; W. Al Briki 32'; F. Laheeb 66'	Report

8 January Friendly	Qatar	0–2	Zimbabwe	Doha, Qatar
		Report	A. Bunjira 39'; Sandira 68'

12 January Friendly	Zimbabwe	0–0	South Africa	Bulawayo, Zimbabwe
		Report

5 May 2002 COSAFA Cup	Zimbabwe	0–2	(Eswatini) Swaziland	Harare, Zimbabwe
		Report	Siz. Dlamini 60'; Sib. Dlamini 80'	Stadium: National Sports Stadium

7 July Friendly	Malawi	3–2	Zimbabwe	Blantyre, Malawi
	E. Kanyenda 13' (pen.); J. Maduka 37'; Nundwe 51'	Report	F. Chandida 57'; J. Matola 63'	Stadium: Chichiri Stadium; Attendance: 35,000

8 July Friendly	Malawi	2–2	Zimbabwe	Lilongwe, Malawi
	F. Kondowe 3'; J. Nkhwazi 85'	Report	M. Mguni 25', 63'	Stadium: Silver Stadium; Attendance: 20,000

30 August Friendly	Zimbabwe	2–0	Lesotho	Harare, Zimbabwe
	Johnson 22', 87'	Report

8 September 2004 AFCON Q	Zimbabwe	1–0	Mali	Harare, Zimbabwe
	L. Muhoni 30'			Stadium: National Sports Stadium; Attendance: 50,000

28 October Friendly	Zimbabwe	0–0	Zambia	Harare, Zimbabwe
		Report

12 October 2004 AFCON Q	Eritrea	0–1	Zimbabwe	Asmara, Eritrea
		Report	P. Ndlovu 10'	Stadium: Cicero Stadium; Attendance: 10,000

Source: Soccerway

=== 2003 ===
16 March Friendly	Zimbabwe	0–0	Malawi	Harare, Zimbabwe
		Report

17 March Friendly	Zimbabwe	0–0	Malawi	Harare, Zimbabwe
		Report		Attendance: 10,000

30 March 2004 AFCON Q	Zimbabwe	3–1	Seychelles	Harare, Zimbabwe
	P. Ndlovu 19' (pen.), 90+4' (pen.); A. Ndlovu 90'		B. Methe 90+1'

20 April 2003 COSAFA Cup	Zimbabwe	1–0	Angola	Harare, Zimbabwe
	A. Ndlovu 20'	Report		Stadium: National Sports Stadium

7 June 2004 AFCON Q	Seychelles	2–1	Zimbabwe	Victoria, Seychelles
	A. Baldé 75' (pen.); P. Zialor 81'	Report	A. Ndlovu 86'	Stadium: Stade Linité

22 June 2004 AFCON Q	Mali	0–0	Zimbabwe	Bamako, Mali
		Report

5 July 2004 AFCON Q	Zimbabwe	2–0	Eritrea	Harare, Zimbabwe
	P. Ndlovu 11', 17' (pen.)	Report

19 July 2003 COSAFA Cup	South Africa	0–1	Zimbabwe	East London, South Africa
		Report	L. Muhoni 15'	Stadium: National Sports Stadium

31 August 2003 COSAFA Cup	Zimbabwe	2–0	(Eswatini) Swaziland	Bulawayo, Zimbabwe
	P. Ndlovu 8', 53'	Report		Stadium: Barbourfields Stadium

27 September 2003 COSAFA Cup	Malawi	1–2	Zimbabwe	Blantyre, Malawi
	R. Mwafulirwa 82'	Report	A. Mbano 7'; Z. Makonese 57'	Stadium: Chichiri Stadium

5 October 2003 COSAFA Cup	Zimbabwe	2–0 (agg: 4–1)	Malawi	Harare, Zimbabwe
	C. Yohane 36'; P. Ndlovu 66'	Report		Stadium: National Sports Stadium

12 October 2006 FWC Q	Zimbabwe	3–0	Mauritania	Harare, Zimbabwe
15:00 GMT	A. Ndlovu 23'; K. Tembo 47'; P. Ndlovu 57'	Report		Stadium: National Sports Stadium; Attendance: 55,000; Referee: Jerome Damon (South Africa)

14 November 2006 FWC Q	Mauritania	2–1 (agg: 2–4)	Zimbabwe	Nouakchott, Mauritania
16:30 GMT	Y. Langlet 3'; A. Sidibe 10'	Report	G. Mbwando 81'	Stadium: Stade Olympique; Attendance: 3,000; Referee: Yakhouba Keita (Guinea)

14 December Friendly	Botswana	0–2	Zimbabwe	Selebi-Phikwe, Botswana
		Report	F. Chandida 30'; S. Sandaka 80'	Attendance: 6,000

Source: Soccerway

=== 2004 ===
25 January 2004 AFCON	Zimbabwe	1–2	Egypt	Sfax, Tunisia
16:30 GMT	P. Ndlovu 46'	Report	T. A. Hamid 58'; M. Barakat 63'	Stadium: Stade Taïeb Mhiri; Attendance: 22,000; Referee: Lassina Paré (Burkina Faso)

29 January 2004 AFCON	Cameroon	5–3	Zimbabwe	Sfax, Tunisia
16:30 GMT	P. M'Boma 31', 44', 65'; M. M'bami 40', 67'	Report	P. Ndlovu 8', 47' (pen.); E. Nyandoro 89'	Stadium: Stade Taïeb Mhiri; Attendance: 15,000; Referee: Abubakar Sharaf (Ivory Coast)

3 February 2004 AFCON	Algeria	1–2	Zimbabwe	Sousse, Tunisia
14:00 GMT	H. Achiou 73'	Report	A. Ndlovu 65'; J. Lupahla 71'	Stadium: Stade Olympique de Sousse; Attendance: 10,000; Referee: Eddy Maillet (Seychelles)

1 May Friendly	Zambia	1–1	Zimbabwe	Lusaka, Zambia
	I. Chansa 79'	Report	B. Ndlovu 89'

16 May Friendly	Zimbabwe	0–0	Zambia	Harare, Zimbabwe
		Report

24 May Friendly	Egypt	2–0	Zimbabwe	Cairo, Egypt
	M. Aboutrika 65'; A. S. Hosny 75' (pen.)	Report

5 June 2006 FWC & AFCON Q	Gabon	1–1	Zimbabwe	Libreville, Gabon
16:00 GMT	T. Nguema 52'	Report	S. Kaondera 82'	Stadium: Stade Omar Bongo; Attendance: 25,000; Referee: Alex Quartey (Ghana)

19 June 2006 FWC & AFCON Q	Zimbabwe	1–1	Algeria	Harare, Zimbabwe
15:00 GMT	S. Raho 60' (o.g.)	Report	A. Cherrad 3'	Stadium: National Sports Stadium; Attendance: 65,000; Referee: Wa Ntambidila (DR Congo)

27 June 2004 COSAFA Cup	Swaziland (Eswatini)	0–5 (abnd.)	Zimbabwe	Lobamba, Swaziland
		Report; Match abandoned at 0–5 on 83 minutes after crowd trouble. The result was allowed to stand.	E. Kasinauyo 7'; P. Ndlovu 51', 58', 81'; B. Masangane 54' (o.g.)	Stadium: Somhlolo National Stadium; Referee: Mateus Infante (Mozambique)

2 July 2006 FWC & AFCON Q	Rwanda	0–2	Zimbabwe	Kigali, Rwanda
16:00 GMT		Report	P. Ndlovu 41'; T. Nengomasha 79'	Stadium: Amahoro Stadium; Attendance: 13,000; Referee: Youngson Chilinda (Malawi)

18 August Friendly	Zimbabwe	2–0	Botswana	Bulawayo, Zimbabwe
	N. Ncube 66'; R. Sibanda 87'	Report

22 August Friendly	Zimbabwe	2–0	Uganda	Harare, Zimbabwe
	Z. Moyo 10'; N. Ncube 66'	Report

5 September 2006 FWC & AFCON Q	Zimbabwe	0–3	Nigeria	Harare, Zimbabwe
16:00 GMT		Report	J. Aghahowa 3'; J. Enakarhire 28'; Yakubu 48' (pen.)	Stadium: National Sports Stadium; Attendance: 60,000; Referee: Joseph Mandzioukouta (Congo)

10 October 2006 FWC & AFCON Q	Angola	1–0	Zimbabwe	Luanda, Angola
16:00 GMT		Report	Flávio 53'	Stadium: Estádio da Cidadela; Attendance: 17,000; Referee: Verson Lwanja (Malawi)

24 October 2004 COSAFA Cup	Zimbabwe	0–0 (4–5 p)	Zambia	Harare, Zimbabwe
		Report		Stadium: National Sports Stadium
	Penalties
	Penalty scored Penalty missed		Penalty scored

Source: Soccerway

=== 2005 ===
26 February Friendly	Malawi	2–1	Zimbabwe	Blantyre, Malawi
	Tambala 45'; V. Phiri 51'	Report	L. Tsipa 54'

15 March Friendly	Zimbabwe	1–1	Botswana	Harare, Zimbabwe
	C. Chimedza 53'	Report	M. Moatlhaping 72'	Stadium: Rufaro Stadium; Attendance: 3,000

27 March 2006 FWC & AFCON Q	Zimbabwe	2–0	Angola	Harare, Zimbabwe
16:00 GMT	S. Kaondera 59'; Benjani 73'	Report		Stadium: National Sports Stadium; Attendance: 40,894; Referee: Coffi Codjia (Benin)

16 April 2005 COSAFA Cup	Mozambique	0–3	Zimbabwe	Windhoek, Namibia
		Report	C. Chimedza 66' (pen.), 78'; S. Sandaka 82'	Stadium: Independence Stadium; Attendance: 6,000; Referee: Arvo Mufeti (Namibia)

17 April 2005 COSAFA Cup	Zimbabwe	2–0	Botswana	Windhoek, Namibia
	B. Badza 21'; S. Sandaka 82'	Report		Stadium: Independence Stadium; Attendance: 2,000; Referee: Jose Mavunza (Angola)

5 June 2006 FWC & AFCON Q	Zimbabwe	1–0	Gabon	Harare, Zimbabwe
15:00 GMT	P. Ndlovu 52'	Report		Stadium: National Sports Stadium; Attendance: 55,000; Referee: Muhmed Ssegonga (Uganda)

19 June 2006 FWC & AFCON Q	Algeria	2–2	Zimbabwe	Oran, Algeria
20:30 GMT	A. Yahia 17'; S. Daoud 48'	Report	S. Kaondera 33'; P. Ndlovu 87'	Stadium: Stade Ahmed Zabana; Attendance: 15,000; Referee: Lassina Paré (Burkina Faso)

13 August 2005 COSAFA Cup	Angola	1–2	Zimbabwe	Mahikeng, South Africa
	Love 51'	Report	F. Chandida 57'; S. Sandaka 87'	Stadium: Mmabatho Stadium; Referee: Patrick Kapanga (Malawi)

14 August 2005 COSAFA Cup	Zimbabwe	1–0	Zambia	Mahikeng, South Africa
	F. Chandida 84'	Report		Stadium: Mmabatho Stadium; Attendance: 1,000; Referee: Antonio Massango (Mozambique)

27 August Friendly	Zimbabwe	0–0	Mozambique	Harare, Zimbabwe
		Report

4 September 2006 FWC & AFCON Q	Zimbabwe	3–1	Rwanda	Harare, Zimbabwe
15:00 GMT	S. Kaondera 4'; Benjani 43'; A. Rambanapasi 78'	Report	Z. Makonese 30' (o.g.)	Stadium: National Sports Stadium; Attendance: 55,000; Referee: Muhmed Ssegonga (Uganda)

8 October 2006 FWC & AFCON Q	Nigeria	5–1	Zimbabwe	Abuja, Nigeria
15:00 GMT	O. Martins 35', 75' (pen.); A. Yussuf 62'; Kanu 80' (pen.); P. Odemwingie 89'	Report	Benjani 70'	Stadium: National Stadium; Attendance: 45,000; Referee: Lassina Paré (Burkina Faso)

30 December Friendly	Zimbabwe	1–1	Zambia	Harare, Zimbabwe
	G. Mbwando 63'	Report	A. Phiri 85'

Source: Soccerway

=== 2006 ===
4 January Friendly	Egypt	2–0	Zimbabwe	Alexandria, Egypt
	Goal	Report		Stadium: Alexandria Stadium

13 January Friendly	Morocco	1–0	Zimbabwe	Marrakesh, Morocco
	M. Armoumen 89'	Report		Stadium: Stade El Harti

23 January 2006 AFCON	Zimbabwe	0–2	Senegal	Port Said, Egypt
20:00 GMT		Report	H. Camara 59'; I. Ba 80'	Stadium: Port Said Stadium; Attendance: 15,000; Referee: Khalid Abdel Rahman (Sudan)

27 January 2006 AFCON	Nigeria	2–0	Zimbabwe	Port Said, Egypt
20:00 GMT	C. Obodo 57'; J. O. Mikel 60'	Report		Stadium: Port Said Stadium; Attendance: 10,000; Referee: Koman Coulibaly (Mali)

31 January 2006 AFCON	Ghana	1–2	Zimbabwe	Ismailia, Egypt
19:00 GMT	B. Adamu 90+2'	Report	I. Ahmed 60' (o.g.); Benjani 68'	Stadium: Ismailia Stadium; Attendance: 18,500; Referee: René Louzaya (Congo)

17 September 2006 COSAFA Cup	Zimbabwe	1–2	Angola	Harare, Zimbabwe
	F. Chandida 64'	Report	Gazeta 45'; Love 73'	Stadium: National Sports Stadium; Attendance: 15,000; Referee: Wellington Kaoma (Zambia)

6 October 2008 AFCON Q	Malawi	1–0	Zimbabwe	Blantyre, Malawi
	M. Chavula 33'	Report		Stadium: Kamuzu Stadium

15 November Friendly	Zimbabwe	3–2	Namibia	Harare, Zimbabwe
14:00 GMT	Goal	Report	Goal	Stadium: Rufaro Stadium

Source: Soccerway

=== 2007 ===
25 March 2008 AFCON Q	Zimbabwe	1–1	Morocco	Harare, Zimbabwe
	E. Nyandoro 82'	Report	Y. Hadji 7'	Stadium: Rufaro Stadium

28 April 2007 COSAFA Cup	Madagascar	0–1	Zimbabwe	Maputo, Mozambique
		Report	K. Nkhatha 8'	Stadium: Estádio da Machava; Attendance: 8,000; Referee: Justino Faduco (Mozambique)

29 April 2007 COSAFA Cup	Mozambique	0–0 (5–4 p)	Zimbabwe	Maputo, Mozambique
		Report		Stadium: Estádio da Machava; Attendance: 12,000; Referee: Rajindraparsad Seechurn (Mauritius)
	Penalties
	Penalty scored		Penalty scored Penalty missed

24 May Friendly	Zimbabwe	1–1	Lesotho	Masvingo, Zimbabwe
	Goal	Report	Goal	Stadium: Mucheke Stadium

27 May Friendly	Zimbabwe	1–1	Burkina Faso	Masvingo, Zimbabwe
	Goal	Report	Goal	Stadium: Mucheke Stadium

2 June 2008 AFCON Q	Morocco	2–0	Zimbabwe	Casablanca, Morocco
21:30 GMT	M. Chamakh 3'; Y. Hadji 26'	Report		Stadium: Stade Mohamed V

20 August Friendly	Mozambique	0–0 (a.e.t.) (3–1 p)	Zimbabwe	Beira, Mozambique
		Report		Stadium: Estádio do Ferroviário
	Penalties
	Penalty scored Penalty missed		Penalty scored

9 September 2008 AFCON Q	Zimbabwe	3–1	Malawi	Bulawayo, Zimbabwe
11:00 GMT	K. Nkhatha 24'; R. Mteki 54'; M. Mwanjali 61'	Report	E. Kanyenda 43'	Stadium: Barbourfields Stadium

Source: Soccerway

=== 2008 ===
10 March Friendly	South Africa	2–1	Zimbabwe	Germiston, South Africa
	S. Ngcobo 73'; J. Matola 90' (o.g.)	Report	G. Mushangazhike 11'	Stadium: Germiston Stadium

26 March Friendly	Botswana	0–1	Zimbabwe	Selebi-Phikwe, Botswana
		Report	Goal

1 June 2010 FWC Q	Guinea	0–0	Zimbabwe	Conakry, Guinea
17:00 GMT		Report		Stadium: Stade du 28 Septembre; Attendance: 12,000; Referee: Djamel Haimoudi (Algeria)

8 June 2010 FWC Q	Zimbabwe	2–0	Namibia	Harare, Zimbabwe
15:00 GMT	G. Mushangazhike 27', 68'	Report		Stadium: Rufaro Stadium; Attendance: 27,979; Referee: Verson Lwanja (Malawi)

14 June 2010 FWC Q	Kenya	2–0	Zimbabwe	Nairobi, Kenya
16:00 GMT	M. Mariga 12'; D. Oliech 85'	Report		Stadium: Nyayo National Stadium; Attendance: 27,500; Referee: Badara Diatta (Senegal)

22 June 2010 FWC Q	Zimbabwe	0–0	Kenya	Harare, Zimbabwe
15:00 GMT		Report		Stadium: Rufaro Stadium; Attendance: 23,000; Referee: Alex Kotey (Ghana)

27 July 2008 COSAFA Cup	Zambia	0–0 (5–4 p)	Zimbabwe	Secunda, South Africa
13:00 GMT		Report		Stadium: Lilian Ngoyi Stadium; Attendance: 2,500; Referee: Jonas Nhlapo (South Africa)
	Penalties
	E. Tana (penalty scored); F. Combe (penalty scored); F. Kasonde (penalty scored); C. Hachilensa (penalty scored); K. Mweene (penalty scored)		G.Banda (penalty scored); E. Meleka (penalty scored); C. Chiutsa (penalty scored); C. Malajila (penalty missed); E. Chikwaikwai (penalty scored)

20 August Friendly	Zimbabwe	1–0	Botswana	Harare, Zimbabwe
	Goal	Report

7 September 2010 FWC Q	Zimbabwe	0–0	Guinea	Harare, Zimbabwe
15:00 GMT		Report		Stadium: Rufaro Stadium; Attendance: 23,000; Referee: Divine Evehe (Cameroon)

12 October 2010 FWC Q	Namibia	4–2	Zimbabwe	Windhoek, Namibia
16:15 GMT	W. Risser 20', 49'; R. Bester 32'; P. Shipanga 44'	Report	E. Nyandoro 51'; C. Malajila 83'	Stadium: Sam Nujoma Stadium; Attendance: 4,000; Referee: Koman Coulibaly (Mali)

Source: Soccerway

=== 2009 ===
9 January Friendly	Tanzania	0–0	Zimbabwe	Dar es Salaam, Tanzania
		Report		Stadium: National Stadium

23 February 2009 CHAN	Ghana	2–2	Zimbabwe	Bouaké, Ivory Coast
	Ayew 44', 67'	Report	Karuru 5', Marufu 36'	Stadium: Bouaké Stadium; Referee: Verson Lwanja (Malawi)

26 February 2009 CHAN	Zimbabwe	1–1	(Democratic Republic of the Congo) DR Congo	Bouaké, Ivory Coast
	Maurufu 28'	Report	Mputu 21'	Stadium: Bouaké Stadium; Referee: Ibrahim Chaibou (Niger)

1 March 2009 CHAN	Zimbabwe	0–0	(History of Libya under Muammar Gaddafi) Libya	Abidjan, Ivory Coast
		Report		Stadium: Felix Houphouet Boigny Stadium; Referee: Kokou Djaoupe (Togo)

22 March Friendly	Bahrain	5–2	Zimbabwe	Riffa, Bahrain
	M. Salmeen 27'; F. Aaish 36'; J. John 54'; A. Fatadi 64'; M. Abdulrahman 76'	Report	A. Rambanapasi 86' (pen.); T. Marfumo 90'	Stadium: Bahrain National Stadium

11 August Friendly	Zimbabwe	1–1	Lesotho	Bulawayo, Zimbabwe
	Goal	Report	Goal	Stadium: Barbourfields Stadium

17 October 2009 COSAFA Cup	Zimbabwe	3–0	Mauritius	Harare, Zimbabwe
15:30 GMT	C. Malajila 47', 55'; M. Mwanjali 85'	Report		Stadium: Rufaro Stadium; Attendance: 25,000; Referee: Abdul Basit Ebrahim (South Africa)

19 October 2009 COSAFA Cup	Lesotho	2–2	Zimbabwe	Harare, Zimbabwe
13:30 GMT	T. Maile 55' (pen.), 85' (pen.)	Report	C. Malajila 6'; E. Gwekwerere 61'	Stadium: Rufaro Stadium; Referee: Tebogo Israel Ramocha (Botswana)

26 October 2009 COSAFA Cup	Zimbabwe	1–0	Botswana	Bulawayo, Zimbabwe
15:30 GMT	M. Maphosa 88'	Report		Stadium: Barbourfields Stadium; Referee: Hélder Martins de Carvalho (Angola)

28 October 2009 COSAFA Cup	South Africa	1–1 (2–3 p)	Zimbabwe	Harare, Zimbabwe
	L. Bacela 37'	Report	P. Marufu 54'	Stadium: Rufaro Stadium; Attendance: 25,000; Referee: Rajindraparsad Seechurn (Mauritius)
	Penalties
	Penalty missed Penalty scored		Penalty scored Penalty missed

1 November 2009 COSAFA Cup	Zimbabwe	3–1	Zambia	Harare, Zimbabwe
15:30 GMT	N. Mushekwi 27', 36'; C. Malajila 45'	Report	H. Banda 25'	Stadium: Rufaro Stadium; Attendance: 35,000; Referee: Hélder Martins de Carvalho (Angola)

1 December 2009 CECAFA Cup	Zimbabwe	0–0	Eritrea	Nairobi, Kenya
16:00 GMT				Stadium: Nyayo National Stadium

3 December 2009 CECAFA Cup	Somalia	0–2	Zimbabwe	Nairobi, Kenya
16:00 GMT			M. Tapiwa 32'; Z. Guthrie 47' (pen.)	Stadium: Nyayo National Stadium

5 December 2009 CECAFA Cup	Zimbabwe	0–1	Rwanda	Nairobi, Kenya
13:00 GMT			Y. Ndayishimiye 10'; T. Ndamuhanga 68', 78'; H. Niyonzima 89'	Stadium: Nyayo National Stadium

8 December 2009 CECAFA Cup	Rwanda	4–1	Zimbabwe	Nairobi, Kenya
16:00 GMT	Y. Ndayishimiye 31'		L. Mutizwa 7'	Stadium: Nyayo National Stadium

Source: Soccerway

== 2010s ==
=== 2010 ===
1 January Friendly	Syria	6–0	Zimbabwe	Kuala Lumpur, Malaysia
10:00 GMT	A. Al-Hussain 36', 43', 67', 85'; F. Esmaeel 52'; A. Abdullah 76'	Report		Stadium: Bukit Jalil National Stadium

27 January Friendly	South Africa	3–0	Zimbabwe	Durban, South Africa
18:30 GMT	S. Tshabalala 49'; T. Mbuyane 76'; L. Thwala 90'	Report		Stadium: Moses Mabhida Stadium; Attendance: 35,000; Referee: Simanga Nhleko (Swaziland)

3 March Friendly	Zimbabwe	2–1	Malawi	Harare, Zimbabwe
13:00 GMT	Goal	Report	Goal	Stadium: National Sports Stadium

2 June Friendly	Zimbabwe	0–3	Brazil	Harare, Zimbabwe
14:30 GMT		Report	M. Bastos 41'; Robinho 44'; Elano 57'	Stadium: National Sports Stadium; Attendance: 30,000; Referee: Simanga Nhleko (Swaziland)

4 August Friendly	Botswana	2–0	Zimbabwe	Selebi-Phikwe, Botswana
17:00 GMT	Goal	Report		Stadium: Selebi-Phikwe Stadium

5 September 2012 AFCON Q	Liberia	1–1	Zimbabwe	Monrovia, Liberia
17:00 GMT	S. Oliseh 68'	Report	K. Musona 30'	Stadium: Samuel Kanyon Doe Sports Complex; Referee: Coffi Codjia (Benin)

10 October 2012 AFCON Q	Zimbabwe	0–0	Cape Verde	Harare, Zimbabwe
14:00 GMT		Report		Stadium: Rufaro Stadium; Referee: Gil Sebastian Ndume (Gabon)

17 November Friendly	Mozambique	1–3	Zimbabwe	Maputo, Mozambique
11:00 GMT	I. Carvalho 90'	Report	K. Musona; N. Mushekwi	Stadium: Estádio do Maxaquene

Source: Soccerway

=== 2011 ===
26 March 2012 AFCON Q	Mali	1–0	Zimbabwe	Bamako, Mali
19:00 GMT	C. Diabaté 22'	Report		Stadium: Stade du 26 Mars; Referee: Bakary Gassama (Gambia)

5 June 2012 AFCON Q	Zimbabwe	2–1	Mali	Harare, Zimbabwe
14:00 GMT	K. Musona 45', 90' (pen.)	Report	M. Traoré 52'	Stadium: Rufaro Stadium; Referee: Daniel Bennett (South Africa)

10 August Friendly	Zimbabwe	2–0	Zambia	Harare, Zimbabwe
18:00 GMT	W. Katsande; K. Billiat	Report		Stadium: National Sports Stadium

4 September 2012 AFCON Q	Zimbabwe	3–0	Liberia	Harare, Zimbabwe
14:00 GMT	O. Karuru 15', 44'; K. Billiat 84'	Report		Stadium: National Sports Stadium; Referee: Mohamed Benouza (Algeria)

8 October 2012 AFCON Q	Cape Verde	2–1	Zimbabwe	Praia, Cape Verde
16:00 GMT	Valdo 3'; R. Mendes 13'	Report	K. Musona 68' (pen.)	Stadium: Estádio da Várzea; Referee: Ali Lemghaifry (Mauritania)

15 November Friendly	Zimbabwe	2–1	South Africa	Harare, Zimbabwe
18:00 GMT	K. Musona 53', 61'	Report	B. Grobler 29'	Stadium: Rufaro Stadium; Referee: Wellington Kaoma (Zambia)

27 November 2011 CECAFA Cup	Zimbabwe	2–0	Djibouti	Dar es Salaam, Tanzania
11:00 GMT	D. Ngoma 9'; Q. Amini 73'	Report		Stadium: National Stadium

29 November 2011 CECAFA Cup	Rwanda	2–0	Zimbabwe	Dar es Salaam, Tanzania
11:00 GMT	M. Kagere 24', 82'	Report		Stadium: National Stadium; Referee: Davies Ogenche Omweno (Kenya)

3 December 2011 CECAFA Cup	Tanzania	1–2	Zimbabwe	Dar es Salaam, Tanzania
13:00 GMT	M. Kazimoto 88'	Report	D. Ngoma 1'; S. Maulid 11' (o.g.)	Stadium: National Stadium; Referee: Davies Ogenche Omweno (Kenya)

6 December 2011 CECAFA Cup	Uganda	1–0	Zimbabwe	Dar es Salaam, Tanzania
11:00 GMT	H. Kiiza 15'	Report		Stadium: National Stadium; Referee: Wiish Yabarow (Somalia)

Source: Soccerway

=== 2012 ===
7 January Friendly	Botswana	0–0	Zimbabwe	Gaborone, Botswana
14:30 GMT		Report		Stadium: Botswana National Stadium

29 February 2013 AFCON Q	Burundi	2–1	Zimbabwe	Bujumbura, Burundi
13:30 GMT	L. Mavugo 46'; V. Nahayo 90+5'	Report	K. Musona 60'	Stadium: Prince Louis Rwagasore Stadium; Referee: Khalid Abdel Rahman (Sudan)

3 June 2014 FWC Q	Zimbabwe	0–1	Guinea	Harare, Zimbabwe
13:30 GMT		Report	I. Traoré 27'	Stadium: National Sports Stadium; Attendance: 30,000; Referee: Rajindraparsad Seechurn (Mauritius)

10 June 2014 FWC Q	Mozambique	0–0	Zimbabwe	Maputo, Mozambique
14:00 GMT		Report		Stadium: Estádio do Zimpeto; Attendance: 26,000; Referee: Ali Kalyango (Uganda)

17 June 2013 AFCON Q	Zimbabwe	1–0 (agg: a2–2)	Burundi	Harare, Zimbabwe
14:00 GMT	K. Musona 36'	Report		Stadium: National Sports Stadium; Referee: Eric Otogo-Castane (Gabon)

16 July Three Nations Tournament	Botswana	1–0	Zimbabwe	Molepolole, Botswana
14:00 GMT	Goal	Report		Stadium: Molopololole Sports Complex

17 July Three Nations Tournament	Lesotho	3–5	Zimbabwe	Molepolole, Botswana
14:00 GMT	10'; T. Maile (pen.); M. Kaipetho 62'	Report	R. Chitiyo; N. Mazivisa 40', 44'; R. Chinyengetere 60'; C. Sibanda 73'	Stadium: Molopololole Sports Complex

8 August Friendly	Zambia	2–1	Zimbabwe	Ndola, Zambia
17:00 GMT	J. Chisenga 35'; J. Sitali 82' (pen.)	Report	R. Chinyengetere 72'	Stadium: Levy Mwanawasa Stadium

9 September 2013 AFCON Q	Zimbabwe	3–1	Angola	Harare, Zimbabwe
14:00 GMT	Mateus 4' (o.g.); K. Billiat 21'; A. Gutu 35'	Report	D. Campos 56'	Stadium: Rufaro Stadium; Referee: Hamada Nampiandraza (Madagascar)

9 September 2013 AFCON Q	Angola	2–0 (agg: a3–3)	Zimbabwe	Luanda, Angola
14:00 GMT	Manucho 5', 7'	Report		Stadium: Estádio 11 de Novembro; Referee: Sylvester Kirwa (Kenya)

Source: Soccerway

=== 2013 ===
6 February Friendly	Zimbabwe	2–1	Botswana	Harare, Zimbabwe
14:00 GMT	K. Billiat 14'; D. Mukamba 24'	Report	L. Tshireletso 3'	Stadium: Rufaro Stadium

26 March 2014 FWC Q	Egypt	2–1	Zimbabwe	Alexandria, Egypt
17:00 GMT	H. Abd Rabo 64'; M. Aboutrika 88' (pen.)	Report	K. Musona 74'	Stadium: Borg El Arab Stadium; Attendance: 10,000; Referee: Bamlak Tessema Weyesa (Ethiopia)

28 April Friendly	Zambia	2–0	Zimbabwe	Lusaka, Zambia
14:00 GMT	B. Mwape 30', 85'	Report		Stadium: Nkoloma Stadium

25 May Friendly	Malawi	1–1	Zimbabwe	Blantyre, Malawi
13:30 GMT	R. Ngalande 29'	Report	K. Musharu 74'	Stadium: Kamuzu Stadium

9 June 2014 FWC Q	Zimbabwe	2–4	Egypt	Harare, Zimbabwe
14:00 GMT	K. Musona 21'; L. Zvasiya 81'	Report	M. Aboutrika 5'; M. Salah 40', 76', 83'	Stadium: National Sports Stadium; Attendance: 40,000; Referee: Bakary Gassama (Gambia)

16 June 2014 FWC Q	Guinea	1–0	Zimbabwe	Conakry, Guinea
18:00 GMT	M. Yattara 37'	Report		Stadium: Stade du 28 Septembre; Attendance: 14,000; Referee: Hamada Nampiandraza (Madagascar)

13 July 2013 COSAFA Cup	Zimbabwe	1–1 (a.e.t.) (3–1 p)	Malawi	Lusaka, Zambia
12:00 GMT	M. Mambare 14'	Report	M. Nyamupanedengu 86' (o.g.)	Stadium: Nkoloma Stadium; Referee: Janny Sikazwe (Zambia)
	Penalties
	D. Chafa (penalty scored); E. Chipeta (penalty scored); L. Chiwunga (penalty missed); O. Mushure (penalty scored)		B. Kaipa (penalty missed); C. Msowoya (penalty scored); G. Simkonda (penalty missed); J. Lanjesi (penalty missed)

17 July 2013 COSAFA Cup	Zimbabwe	2–1	Lesotho	Ndola, Zambia
16:00 GMT	T. Ndoro 15', 25'	Report	M. Mofolo 3'	Stadium: Levy Mwanawasa Stadium; Referee: Samuel Chirinda (Mozambique)

20 July 2013 COSAFA Cup	Zimbabwe	0–2	Zambia	Ndola, Zambia
14:30 GMT		Report	A. Ngonga 5'; K. Chongo 90+2'	Stadium: Levy Mwanawasa Stadium; Referee: Bernard Camille (Seychelles)

28 July 2014 CHAN Q	Mauritius	0–3	Zimbabwe	Curepipe, Mauritius
12:00 GMT		Report	N. Mazivisa 15', 89'; S. Sithole	Stadium: Stade George V Referee: Nelson Fred (Seychelles)

4 August 2014 CHAN Q	Zimbabwe	1–1 (agg: 4–1)	Mauritius	Harare, Zimbabwe
14:00 GMT	M. Mambare 85'	Report	G. Calambé 89'	Stadium: Rufaro Stadium; Referee: Samuel Chirinda (Mozambique)

18 August 2014 CHAN Q	Zimbabwe	0–0	Zambia	Harare, Zimbabwe
14:00 GMT		Report		Stadium: Rufaro Stadium; Referee: Aurelien Juankou Wandji (Cameroon)

24 August 2014 CHAN Q	Zambia	0–1 (agg: 0–1)	Zimbabwe	Ndola, Zambia
14:00 GMT		Report	C. Sibanda 65'	Stadium: Levy Mwanawasa Stadium; Referee: Anthony Raphael (Malawi)

8 September 2014 FWC Q	Zimbabwe	1–1	Mozambique	Harare, Zimbabwe
14:00 GMT	M. Mambare 42'	Report	Maninho 69'	Stadium: Rufaro Stadium; Attendance: 7,000; Referee: Mahamadou Keita (Mali)

10 September 2014 FWC Q	South Africa	1–2	Zimbabwe	Johannesburg, South Africa
14:00 GMT	B. Parker 90+6'	Report	K. Musona 50'; C. Malajila 90+5'	Stadium: Orlando Stadium

19 November Friendly	Tanzania	0–0	Zimbabwe	Dar es Salaam, Tanzania
14:00 GMT		Report		Stadium: National Stadium

8 December Friendly	Zimbabwe	2–1	Mozambique	Bulawayo, Zimbabwe
18:00 GMT	S. Nhivi 9'; A. Sadiki 79'	Report	E. Mafumo 42' (pen.)	Stadium: Barbourfields Stadium; Attendance: 5,000

Source: Soccerway

=== 2014 ===
7 January Friendly	Zimbabwe	2–0	Gabon	Johannesburg, South Africa
13:30 GMT	D. Ngoma 45'; M. Ncube 85'	Report		Stadium: Rand Stadium

12 January 2014 CHAN	Zimbabwe	0–0	Morocco	Cape Town, South Africa
15:00 GMT		Report		Stadium: Athlone Stadium; Attendance: 4,000; Referee: Bamlak Tessema Weyesa (Ethiopia)

16 January 2014 CHAN	Zimbabwe	0–0	Uganda	Cape Town, South Africa
15:00 GMT		Report		Stadium: Athlone Stadium; Attendance: 5,000; Referee: Malang Diedhiou (Senegal)

20 January 2014 CHAN	Burkina Faso	0–1	Zimbabwe	Cape Town, South Africa
15:00 GMT		Report	M. Mambare 56'	Stadium: Athlone Stadium; Attendance: 7,200; Referee: Mohamed Said Kordi (Tunisia)

25 January 2014 CHAN	Mali	1–2	Zimbabwe	Cape Town, South Africa
18:30 GMT	H. Sinayoko 89'	Report	S. Sithole 11'; K. Mahachi 56'	Stadium: Cape Town Stadium; Attendance: 13,000; Referee: Mohamed Said Kordi (Tunisia)

29 January 2014 CHAN	Zimbabwe	0–0 (a.e.t.) (4–5 p)	Libya	Bloemfontein, South Africa
15:00 GMT		Report		Stadium: Free State Stadium; Attendance: 5,000; Referee: Bamlak Tessema Weyesa (Ethiopia)
	Penalties
	E. Chipeta (penalty scored); D. Phiri (penalty scored); S. Sithole (penalty missed); P. Moyo (penalty missed); H. Zvirekwi (penalty scored); M. Ncube (penalty missed); P. Jaure (penalty scored); A. Sadiki (penalty missed)		E. Abushnaf (penalty scored); M. Al Ghanodi (penalty scored); M. A. Mahfud (penalty missed); A. R. Fetori (penalty scored); A. Salama (penalty missed); M. M. Sabbou (penalty missed); M. E. Elgadi (penalty scored); M. Nashnoush (penalty scored)

1 February 2014 CHAN	Zimbabwe	0–1	Nigeria	Cape Town, South Africa
15:00 GMT		Report	C. Obiozor 11'	Stadium: Cape Town Stadium; Attendance: 10,000; Referee: Victor Gomes (South Africa)

5 March Friendly	Malawi	1–4	Zimbabwe	Blantyre, Malawi
12:30 GMT	A. Nyondo 50'	Report	P. Moyo 20'; K. Mahachi 54'; P. Manhanga 71'; K. Nkhatha	Stadium: Kamuzu Stadium

18 May 2015 AFCON Q	Tanzania	1–0	Zimbabwe	Dar es Salaam, Tanzania
14:00 GMT	R. Bocco 13'	Report		Stadium: National Stadium; Referee: Joseph Lamptey (Ghana)

1 June 2015 AFCON Q	Zimbabwe	2–2 (agg: 2–3)	Tanzania	Harare, Zimbabwe
14:00 GMT	D. Phiri 3'; W. Katsande 54'	Report	N. Haroub 22'; T. Ulimwengu 46'	Stadium: National Sports Stadium; Referee: Bernard Camille (Seychelles)

30 September Friendly	Botswana	1–0	Zimbabwe	Gaborone, Botswana
14:00 GMT	G. Moyana 75'	Report		Stadium: Botswana National Stadium

Source: Soccerway

=== 2015 ===
17 May 2015 COSAFA Cup	Zimbabwe	2–0	Mauritius	Rustenburg, South Africa
16:30 GMT	C. Rusere 28'; R. Chitiyo 66'	Report		Stadium: Moruleng Stadium; Referee: Joshua Bondo (Botswana)

19 May 2015 COSAFA Cup	Seychelles	0–1	Zimbabwe	Rustenburg, South Africa
16:00 GMT		Report	T. Chawapiwa 52'	Stadium: Moruleng Stadium; Referee: Simanga Nhleko (Swaziland)

21 May 2015 COSAFA Cup	Namibia	4–1	Zimbabwe	Rustenburg, South Africa
16:00 GMT	C. Katjiukua 9'; D. Hotto 60', 67'; S. Urikhob 84'	Report	R. Manuvire 83'	Stadium: Moruleng Stadium; Referee: Hamada Nampiandraza (Madagascar)

13 June 2017 AFCON Q	Malawi	1–2	Zimbabwe	Blantyre, Malawi
13:30 GMT	J. Banda 24'	Report	C. Malajila 23'; K. Billiat 83'	Stadium: Kamuzu Stadium; Referee: Christopher Nde (Cameroon)

20 June 2016 CHAN Q	Zimbabwe	2–0	Comoros	Harare, Zimbabwe
14:00 GMT	E. Rusike 10'; M. Mudehwe 90'	Report		Stadium: Rufaro Stadium; Referee: Mbongiseni Fakudze (Swaziland)

4 July 2016 CHAN Q	Comoros	0–0 (agg: 0–2)	Zimbabwe	Moroni, Comoros
13:00 GMT		Report		Stadium: Stade de Beaumer; Referee: Samuel Chirindza (Mozambique)

6 September 2017 AFCON Q	Zimbabwe	1–1	Guinea	Harare, Zimbabwe
14:00 GMT	K. Musona 34'	Report	I. Sylla 34'	Stadium: Rufaro Stadium; Referee: Lekgotla Leonard Johannes (Botswana)

18 October 2016 CHAN Q	Zimbabwe	3–1	Lesotho	Bulawayo, Zimbabwe
14:00 GMT	R. Mutuma 48' (pen.), 56'; D. Phiri 81'	Report	T. Seturumane 63'	Stadium: Barbourfields Stadium; Referee: Sheha Waziri (Tanzania)

25 October 2016 CHAN Q	Lesotho	1–1 (agg: 2–4)	Zimbabwe	Maseru, Lesotho
14:00 GMT	B. Moyo 79' (pen.)	Report	R. Mutuma 35'	Stadium: Setsoto Stadium; Referee: Kalasande Qongo (South Africa)

Source: Soccerway

=== 2016 ===
19 January 2016 CHAN	Zimbabwe	0–1	Zambia	Gisenyi, Rwanda
13:00 GMT		Report	I. Chansa 57'	Stadium: Umuganda Stadium; Referee: Hudu Munyemana (Rwanda)

23 January 2016 CHAN	Zimbabwe	0–1	Mali	Gisenyi, Rwanda
13:00 GMT		Report	M. Sissoko 84'	Stadium: Umuganda Stadium; Referee: Davies Ogenche Omweno (Kenya)

27 January 2016 CHAN	Uganda	1–1	Zimbabwe	Gisenyi, Rwanda
14:00 GMT	G. Sserunkuma 90'	Report	W. Manondo 49'	Stadium: Umuganda Stadium; Referee: Malang Diedhiou (Senegal)

25 March 2017 AFCON Q	Swaziland (Eswatini)	1–1	Zimbabwe	Lobamba, Swaziland
13:30 GMT	F. Badenhorst 17'	Report	N. Ndlovu 44' (o.g.)	Stadium: Somhlolo National Stadium; Referee: Hélder Martins de Carvalho (Angola)

28 March 2017 AFCON Q	Zimbabwe	4–0	(Eswatini) Swaziland	Harare, Zimbabwe
14:00 GMT	K. Musona 52' (pen.); C. Nhamoinesu 59'; E. Rusike 77'; K. Billiat 85'	Report		Stadium: National Sports Stadium; Referee: Ali Mohamed Adelaïd (Comoros)

31 May Friendly	Zimbabwe	2–0	Uganda	Harare, Zimbabwe
14:00 GMT	T. Hadebe 4', 30'	Report		Stadium: Rufaro Stadium; Referee: Norman Matemera (Zimbabwe)

5 June 2017 AFCON Q	Zimbabwe	3–0	Malawi	Harare, Zimbabwe
14:00 GMT	K. Musona 15' (pen.); K. Billiat 36'; C. Malajila 87'	Report		Stadium: National Sports Stadium; Referee: Juste Ephrem Zio (Burkina Faso)

11 June 2016 COSAFA Cup	Zimbabwe	2–2	(Eswatini) Swaziland	Windhoek, Namibia
15:00 GMT	O. Tarumbwa 56'; E. Muroiwa 79'	Report	F. Badenhorst 16', 65' (pen.)	Stadium: Sam Nujoma Stadium; Referee: Janny Sikazwe (Zambia)

13 June 2016 COSAFA Cup	Madagascar	0–0	Zimbabwe	Windhoek, Namibia
18:30 GMT		Report		Stadium: Sam Nujoma Stadium; Referee: Jackson Pavaza (Namibia)

15 June 2016 COSAFA Cup	Zimbabwe	5–0	Seychelles	Windhoek, Namibia
16:00 GMT	R. Pfumbidzai 23' (pen.); M. Mudehwe 37'; L. Mhlanga 64', 90+3'; T. Hadebe 73'	Report		Stadium: Sam Nujoma Stadium; Referee: Hélder Martins de Carvalho (Angola)

4 September 2017 AFCON Q	Guinea	1–0	Zimbabwe	Conakry, Guinea
18:00 GMT	G. Landel 15'	Report		Stadium: Stade du 28 Septembre; Referee: Mohamed Ragab Omar (Libya)

5 November Friendly	Zimbabwe	1–0	Zambia	Harare, Zimbabwe
13:00 GMT	T. Hadebe 54'	Report		Stadium: National Sports Stadium

13 November Friendly	Zimbabwe	3–0	Tanzania	Harare, Zimbabwe
13:00 GMT	K. Musona 45'; M. Rusike 54'; N. Mushekwi 56'	Report		Stadium: National Sports Stadium

26 December Friendly	Ivory Coast	0–0	Zimbabwe	Abidjan, Ivory Coast
18:00 GMT		Report		Stadium: Stade Robert Champroux; Attendance: 2,114; Referee: Denis Dembélé (Ivory Coast)

Source: Soccerway

=== 2017 ===
10 January Friendly	Cameroon	1–1	Zimbabwe	Yaoundé, Cameroon
17:00 GMT	B. Moukandjo 28' (pen.)	Report	T. Ndoro 14'	Stadium: Stade Ahmadou Ahidjo; Attendance: 5,000; Referee: Aurélien Juenkou (Cameroon)

15 January 2017 AFCON	Algeria	2–2	Zimbabwe	Franceville, Gabon
16:00 GMT	R. Mahrez 12', 82'	Report	K. Mahachi 17'; N. Mushekwi 29' (pen.)	Stadium: Stade de Franceville; Referee: Bamlak Tessema Weyesa (Ethiopia)

19 January 2017 AFCON	Senegal	2–0	Zimbabwe	Franceville, Gabon
19:00 GMT	S. Mané 9'; H. Saivet 13'	Report		Stadium: Stade de Franceville; Referee: Rédouane Jiyed (Morocco

23 January 2017 AFCON	Zimbabwe	2–4	Tunisia	Libreville, Gabon
19:00 GMT	K. Musona 42'; T. Ndoro 58'	Report	N. Sliti 9'; Y. Msakni 22'; T. Khenissi 36'; W. Khazri 45' (pen.)	Stadium: Stade d'Angondjé; Referee: Denis Dembélé (Ivory Coast)

26 March Friendly	Zimbabwe	0–0	Zambia	Harare, Zimbabwe
14:00 BST		Report		Stadium: National Sports Stadium

11 June 2019 AFCON Q	Zimbabwe	3–0	Liberia	Harare, Zimbabwe
14:00 BST	K. Musona 24', 50', 63'	Report		Stadium: National Sports Stadium; Referee: Alex Muhabi (Uganda)

26 June 2017 COSAFA Cup	Mozambique	0–4	Zimbabwe	Saulspoort, South Africa
16:00 BST		Report	O. Karuru 45+2', 66'; O. Mushure 78'; B. Majarira 90+3'	Stadium: Moruleng Stadium; Referee: Ahmad Imtehaz Heeralall (Mauritius)

28 June 2017 COSAFA Cup	Zimbabwe	0–0	Madagascar	Phokeng, South Africa
16:00 BST		Report		Stadium: Royal Bafokeng Stadium; Referee: Joshua Bondo (Botswana)

30 June 2017 COSAFA Cup	Zimbabwe	6–0	Seychelles	Phokeng, South Africa
16:00 BST	O. Karuru 24', 26', 67'; P. Dube 57'; O. Mushure 85', 90+3'	Report		Stadium: Royal Bafokeng Stadium; Referee: Jackson Pavaza (Namibia)

2 July 2017 COSAFA Cup	Swaziland (Eswatini)	1–2	Zimbabwe	Phokeng, South Africa
18:30 BST	F. Badenhorst 48'	Report	O. Karuru 16'; K. Mutizwa 79'	Stadium: Royal Bafokeng Stadium; Referee: Victor Gomes (South Africa)

5 July 2017 COSAFA Cup	Lesotho	3–4	Zimbabwe	Saulspoort, South Africa
18:30 BST	S. Motebang 42'; M. Potloane 80'; T. Koetle 90+2'	Report	K. Mutizwa 19', 51', 83'; T. Chawapiwa 64'	Stadium: Moruleng Stadium; Referee: Hélder Martins De Carvalho (Angola)

9 July 2017 COSAFA Cup	Zambia	1–3	Zimbabwe	Phokeng, South Africa
14:00 BST	L. Mundia 39'; M. Potloane 80'; T. Koetle 90+2'	Report	K. Mutizwa 22'; T. Chawapiwa 57'; O. Mushure 67'	Stadium: Royal Bafokeng Stadium; Referee: Ahmad Imtehaz Heeralall (Mauritius)

15 July 2018 CHAN Q	Namibia	1–0	Zimbabwe	Windhoek, Namibia
	H. Somaeb 47'	Report		Stadium: Sam Nujoma Stadium; Referee: Dennis Nguluwe (Malawi)

22 July 2018 CHAN Q	Zimbabwe	1–0 (agg: 1–1) (4–5 p)	Namibia	Harare, Zimbabwe
	P. Dube 39'	Report		Stadium: National Sports Stadium
	Penalties
	Penalty scored Penalty missed		Penalty scored

8 November Friendly	Lesotho	1–0	Zimbabwe	Maseru, Lesotho
19:00	H. Kalake 90'	Report		Stadium: Setsoto Stadium

11 November Dr Hage Geingob Cup	Namibia	3–1	Zimbabwe	Windhoek, Namibia
16:00	H. Somaeb 15', 41' (pen.); P. Shalulile 18'	Report	T. Ndoro 32' (pen.)	Stadium: Sam Nujoma Stadium

Source: Soccerway

=== 2018 ===
21 March 2018 FNT	Zambia	2–2 (a.e.t.) (5–4 p)	Zimbabwe	Ndola, Zambia
18:00 CAT	Shonga 64'; Kambole 90'	Report	Shamujompa 47' (o.g.); Chawapiwa 74'	Stadium: Levy Mwanawasa Stadium; Referee: Tirelo Mositwane (Botswana)

24 March 2018 FNT	Angola	2–2 (a.e.t.) (4–2 p)	Zimbabwe	Ndola, Zambia
14:00 CAT	Djalma 45+1'; Yano 90'	Report	Amidu 22'; Chawapiwa 54'	Stadium: Levy Mwanawasa Stadium; Attendance: 36,000; Referee: Patrick Ngoleka (Malawi)

3 June 2018 COSAFA Cup QF	Zimbabwe	1–1 (a.e.t.) (3–1 p)	Botswana	Polokwane, South Africa
17:30 SAST	Rusike 39'	Report	Makgantai 60'	Stadium: Peter Mokaba Stadium; Referee: Hélder Martins De Carvalho (Angola)
	Penalties
	Amidu (penalty scored); Mukombwe (penalty scored); Billiat (penalty scored)		(penalty scored) Seakanyeng; (penalty missed) Sosome; (penalty missed) Orebonye; (penalty missed) Kgamanyane

6 June 2018 COSAFA Cup SF	Lesotho	0–0 (a.e.t.) (1–3 p)	Zimbabwe	Polokwane, South Africa
19:30 SAST		Report		Stadium: Peter Mokaba Stadium; Referee: Ahmad Imtehaz Heeralall (Mauritius)
	Penalties
	Kalake (penalty missed); Moremoholo (penalty missed); Nkoto (penalty scored); Thabantso (penalty missed)		(penalty scored) Billiat; (penalty scored) Mukombwe; (penalty scored) Mudimu

9 June 2018 COSAFA Cup Final	Zambia	2–4 (a.e.t.)	Zimbabwe	Polokwane, South Africa
15:00 SAST	Kambole 8', 50'	Report	Kadewere 4', 90+3'; Billiat 101' (pen.), 117'	Stadium: Peter Mokaba Stadium; Referee: Hélder Martins De Carvalho (Angola)

9 September 2019 AFCON Q	Congo	1–1	Zimbabwe	Brazzaville, Congo
15:30 WAT	Bifouma 50'	Report (CAF)	Billiat 22'	Stadium: Stade Alphonse Massemba-Débat; Referee: Victor Gomes (South Africa)

13 October 2019 AFCON Q	DR Congo	1–2	Zimbabwe	Kinshasa, DR Congo
18:30 WAT	Bolasie 90+3'	Report (CAF)	Pfumbidzai 21'; Musona 69'	Stadium: Stade des Martyrs; Referee: Rédouane Jiyed (Morocco)

16 October 2019 AFCON Q	Zimbabwe	1–1	DR Congo	Harare, Zimbabwe
15:00 CAT	Billiat 2'	Report (CAF)	Hadebe 24' (o.g.)	Stadium: National Sports Stadium; Referee: Gehad Grisha (Egypt)

18 November 2019 AFCON Q	Liberia	1–0	Zimbabwe	Monrovia, Liberia
16:00 GMT	Jebor 72'	Report (CAF)		Stadium: Samuel Kanyon Doe Sports Complex; Referee: Maguette N'Diaye (Senegal)

=== 2019 ===
24 March 2019 AFCON Q	Zimbabwe	2–0	Congo	Harare, Zimbabwe
15:00 CAT	Billiat 20'; Musona 36'	Report (CAF)		Stadium: National Sports Stadium; Referee: El Fadil Mohamed (Sudan)

1 June 2019 COSAFA Cup QF	Zimbabwe	2–0	Comoros	Durban, South Africa
17:30 SAST	Rusike 6'; Billiat 36'	Report		Stadium: Princess Magogo Stadium; Referee: Eugene Salas Mdluli (South Africa)

5 June 2019 COSAFA Cup SF	Zimbabwe	0–0 (2–4 p)	Zambia	Durban, South Africa
19:30 SAST		Report		Stadium: Moses Mabhida Stadium; Referee: Ali Mohamed Adelaid (Comoros)
	Penalties
	Billiat (penalty missed); Muskwe (penalty missed); Nakamba (penalty scored); Darikwa (penalty scored)		(penalty scored) Mwape; (penalty scored) Chirwa; (penalty scored) Phiri; (penalty scored) Musakanya

7 June 2019 COSAFA Cup 3rd	Lesotho	2–2 (4–5 p)	Zimbabwe	Durban, South Africa
19:30 SAST	Thaba-Ntšo 33'; Bereng 68'	Report	T. Rusike 14'; Mavunga 61'	Stadium: Moses Mabhida Stadium; Referee: Celso Alvação (Mozambique)
	Penalties
	Koetle (penalty scored); Kalake (penalty scored); Motebang (penalty scored); Bereng (penalty missed); Fothoane (penalty scored)		(penalty scored) T. Rusike; (penalty scored) Pfumbidzai; (penalty scored) Kutinyu; (penalty scored) Chinyengetere; (penalty scored) Dauda

8 June Friendly	Nigeria	0–0	Zimbabwe	Asaba, Nigeria
18:00 WAT		Report		Stadium: Stephen Keshi Stadium; Attendance: 15,650; Referee: Adissa Abdul Raphiou Ligali (Benin)

16 June Friendly	Tanzania	1–1	Zimbabwe	Cairo, Egypt
20:00 CAT		Report		Stadium: El Sekka El Hadid Stadium

21 June 2019 AFCON	Egypt	1–0	Zimbabwe	Cairo, Egypt
22:00 CAT	Trézéguet 41'	Report		Stadium: Cairo International Stadium; Attendance: 73,299; Referee: Sidi Alioum (Cameroon)

26 June 2019 AFCON	Uganda	1–1	Zimbabwe	Cairo, Egypt
19:00 CAT	Okwi 12'	Report	Billiat 40'	Stadium: Cairo International Stadium; Attendance: 73,589; Referee: Eric Otogo-Castane (Gabon)

30 June 2019 AFCON	Zimbabwe	0–4	DR Congo	Cairo, Egypt
21:00 CAT		Report	Bolingi 4'; Bakambu 34', 65' (pen.); Assombalonga 78'	Stadium: 30 June Stadium; Referee: Mustapha Ghorbal (Algeria)

29 July 2020 CHAN Q	Mauritius	0–4	Zimbabwe	Flacq, Mauritius
10:00 CAT		Report	Masuku 19'; Mavunga 44', 87'; Tigere 68'	Stadium: Stade Auguste Vollaire; Referee: Lebalang Martin Mokete (Lesotho)

4 August 2020 CHAN Q	Zimbabwe	3–1 (7–1 agg.)	Mauritius	Bulawayo, Zimbabwe
15:00 CAT	Dube 15', 67', 83'	Report	A. Aristide 3'	Stadium: Barbourfields Stadium; Referee: Audrick Nkole (Zambia)

5 September 2022 FWC Q	Somalia	1–0	Zimbabwe	Djibouti City, Djibouti (Note: Played in Djibouti due to security concerns from the ongoing civil war.)
18:00 CAT	Shakunda 86'	Report		Stadium: El Hadj Hassan Gouled Aptidon Stadium; Attendance: 4,000; Referee: Alfred Pousri Armi (Chad)

10 September 2022 FWC Q	Zimbabwe	3–1 (3–2 agg.)	Somalia	Harare, Zimbabwe
15:00 CAT	Munetsi 77'; Muskwe 86'; Billiat 90'	Report	Mohamed 85'	Stadium: National Sports Stadium; Referee: Andofetra Rakotojaona (Madagascar)

22 September 2020 CHAN Q	Zimbabwe	3–1	Lesotho	Harare, Zimbabwe
15:00 CAT	Dube 23'; Jaure 60'; Taderera 84'	Report	Kalake 90+3' (pen.)	Stadium: National Sports Stadium; Referee: Audrick Nkole (Zambia)

20 October 2020 CHAN Q	Lesotho	0–0 (1–3 agg.)	Zimbabwe	Maseru, Lesotho
15:00 CAT		Report		Stadium: Setsoto Stadium; Referee: Egbert Yvon Havelock (Seychelles)

15 November 2021 AFCON Q	Zimbabwe	0–0	Botswana	Harare, Zimbabwe
18:00 CAT		Report		Stadium: National Sports Stadium; Referee: Thierry Nkurunziza (Burundi)

19 November 2021 AFCON Q	Zambia	1–2	Zimbabwe	Lusaka, Zambia
18:00 CAT	Daka 20'	Report	Billiat 11', 79'	Stadium: National Heroes Stadium; Referee: Mahamadou Keita (Mali)

Source: Soccerway

== 2000s home venues ==
As of 4 October 2017.

P	City	Times
1	(Harare) National Sports Stadium	37
2	(Harare) Rufaro Stadium	22
3	(Bulawayo) Barbourfields Stadium	7
4	(Zimbabwe) Mucheke Stadium	2

Source: Soccerway

== See also ==
- Asiagate – A match fixing scandal involving several Zimbabwe national football team friendly matches in Asia.
