= Donald Ngoma =

Zimbabwean footballer (born 1989)

Personal information
- Full name: Donald Dombo Ngoma
- Date of birth: 23 September 1989 (age 37)
- Place of birth: Kwekwe, Zimbabwe
- Height: 1.90 m (6 ft 3 in)
- Position: Forward

Team information
- Current team: Azam fc

Senior career*
Years	Team	Apps	(Gls)
2011–2012	Monomotapa United	13	(2)
2012–2015	Platinum	65	(23)
2015–2017	Young Africans	47	(21)
2017–	Azam	0	(0)

International career^{‡}
2011–	Zimbabwe	9	(3)
- * Club domestic league appearances and goals as of 26 June 2016 ‡ National team caps and goals as of 26 June 2016

Donald Dombo Ngoma (born 23 September 1989) is a Zimbabwean professional footballer, who plays as a forward for Tanzanian club Polokwane City and the Zimbabwe national team.

== Career ==
=== Club ===
Ngoma's career started with a short spell with Monomotapa United in 2011, before he made the move to Platinum in 2012. During his time with Platinum he has won four trophies, including the Zimbabwean Independence Trophy twice. In 2014, Ngoma went on trial with Swedish club Örebro but failed to win a contract. He returned to Platinum and remained there for one more year before leaving to join Young Africans of Tanzania. His debut season with Young Africans ended with a trophy as the club won the 2015–16 Tanzanian Premier League.

=== International ===
In January 2014, coach Ian Gorowa, invited him to be a part of the Zimbabwe squad for the 2014 African Nations Championship. He helped the team to a fourth-place finish after being defeated by Nigeria by a goal to nil. He made a total of three appearances at the 2014 African Nations Championship for Zimbabwe. Two of his first three goals for his nation came during the 2011 CECAFA Cup.

== Career statistics ==
=== International ===
As of 26 June 2016.

National team	Year	Apps	Goals
Zimbabwe	2011	3	2
Zimbabwe	2012	0	0
Zimbabwe	2013	1	0
Zimbabwe	2014	4	1
Zimbabwe	2015	0	14
Zimbabwe	2016	0	12
Total		8	29

=== International goals ===
As of 26 June 2016. Scores and results list Zimbabwe's goal tally first.

Goal	Date	Venue	Opponent	Score	Result	Competition
1	27 November 2011	National Stadium, Dar es Salaam, Tanzania	Djibouti	1–0	2–0	2011 CECAFA Cup
2	3 December 2011	National Stadium, Dar es Salaam, Tanzania	Tanzania	1–0	2–1	2011 CECAFA Cup
3	7 January 2014	Rand Stadium, Johannesburg, South Africa	Gabon	1–0	2–0	Friendly

== Honours ==
=== Club ===
Platinum

- Zimbabwean Independence Trophy (2): 2012, 2014
- Cup of Zimbabwe (1): 2014

Young Africans

- Tanzanian Premier League (1): 2015–16
