= Ali Sadiki =

Zimbabwean footballer (born 1987)

Personal information
- Full name: Ali Sadiki
- Date of birth: 10 December 1987 (age 38)
- Place of birth: Harare, Zimbabwe
- Height: 1.75 m (5 ft 9 in)
- Position: Midfielder

Team information
- Current team: Kabwe Warriors

Youth career
- Assa Academy

Senior career*
Years	Team	Apps	(Gls)
2008	Harare United		
2008–2010	Witbank Spurs		
2010–2012	Gunners		
2012–2014	Platinum		
2014–2017	TP Mazembe		
2015–2016	→ Don Bosco (loan)		
2017–2019	Platinum		
2019–	Kabwe Warriors		

International career^{‡}
2013–	Zimbabwe	8	(1)
- * Club domestic league appearances and goals as of 27 June 2016 ‡ National team caps and goals as of 27 June 2016

Ali Sadiki (born 10 December 1987) is a Zimbabwean professional footballer, who plays as a midfielder for Zambian club Kabwe Warriors and the Zimbabwe national team.

== Career ==
=== Club ===
Sadiki's career began in Zimbabwe with Harare United, however his stay with them was short as he left due to the club going defunct. He subsequently joined South African second-tier side Witbank Spurs, whom he left in 2010 to return to Zimbabwe to join Gunners where he remained until 2012 when he joined Platinum, after two years with Platinum he left Zimbabwe for the second time to sign for DR Congo club TP Mazembe on a five-year deal on 31 May 2014. Just over a year after signing for TP Mazembe, Sadiki was loaned out to Don Bosco.

=== International ===
In January 2014, coach Ian Gorowa, invited him to be a part of the Zimbabwe squad for the 2014 African Nations Championship. He helped the team to a fourth-place finish after being defeated by Nigeria by a goal to nil. Six of Sadiki's eight Zimbabwe caps came in the 2014 African Nations Championship, while his only goal for his nation came in a 2013 friendly versus Mozambique.

== Career statistics ==
=== International ===
As of 27 June 2016.

National team	Year	Apps	Goals
Zimbabwe	2013	1	1
Zimbabwe	2014	7	0
Zimbabwe	2015	0	0
Zimbabwe	2016	0	0
Total		8	1

=== International goals ===
As of 27 June 2016. Scores and results list Zimbabwe's goal tally first.

Goal	Date	Venue	Opponent	Score	Result	Competition
1	8 December 2013	Barbourfields Stadium, Bulawayo, Zimbabwe	Mozambique	2–1	2–1	Friendly

== Honours ==
=== Club ===
Gunners

- Zimbabwe Premier Soccer League (1): 2009

Platinum

- Zimbabwean Independence Trophy (2): 2012, 2014
- Cup of Zimbabwe (1): 2014

TP Mazembe

- Super Coupe du Congo (1): 2014
