= Tafadzwa Dube =

Zimbabwean footballer (born 1984)

Personal information
- Date of birth: 19 December 1984 (age 41)
- Place of birth: Mbizo, Kwekwe, Zimbabwe
- Position: Goalkeeper

Team information
- Current team: Manica Diamonds

Senior career*
Years	Team	Apps	(Gls)
2005–2007	Masvingo United		
2008	Dynamos		
2009–2010	Gunners		
2011–2012	Platinum		
2013–2014	CAPS United		
2015–2016	Harare City		
2017	Yadah Stars		
2018	Mutare City Rovers		
2019–	Manica Diamonds		

International career
2003–2013	Zimbabwe		
- * Club domestic league appearances and goals

Tafadzwa Dube is a Zimbabwean professional footballer, who formerly played as a goalkeeper for Lancashire Steel F.C and Harare City F.C. He is also former player of the CAPS United F.C.

== International career ==
In January 2014, coach Ian Gorowa, invited him to be a part of the Zimbabwe squad for the 2014 African Nations Championship. He helped the team to a fourth-place finish after being defeated by Nigeria by a goal to nil.
