= Pascal Manhanga =

Zimbabwean footballer (born 1991)

Personal information
- Full name: Pascal Ovidy Manhanga
- Date of birth: 23 March 1991 (age 35)
- Place of birth: Harare, Zimbabwe
- Position: Midfielder

Team information
- Current team: How Mine

Senior career*
Years	Team	Apps	(Gls)
2009–2010	Mutare United		
2010–2011	Tsholotsho Pirates		
2011–2014	Triangle United		
2014–2015	Highlanders		
2015–2016	Triangle United		
2016–	How Mine		

International career^{‡}
2014–	Zimbabwe	4	(1)
- * Club domestic league appearances and goals as of 26 June 2016 ‡ National team caps and goals as of 26 June 2016

Pascal Ovidy Manhanga (born 23 March 1991) is a Zimbabwean professional footballer, who plays as a midfielder for How Mine and the Zimbabwe national team. He is known for creating and scoring goals.

== Club career ==
Manhanga started his career in the lower leagues of Zimbabwe, firstly with Mutare United and then with Tsholotsho Pirates, he remained with both sides for a year each before moving to Triangle United. He spent three years with Triangle Utd before he was signed by the 2013 Mbada Diamonds Cup winners Highlanders in June 2014. His stay with the Highlanders was short as he left to rejoin Triangle Utd at the start of 2015. However, a year later he was on the move again as he departed Triangle Utd for the second time to sign for How Mine.

== International career ==
In January 2014, coach Ian Gorowa, invited him to be a part of the Zimbabwe squad for the 2014 African Nations Championship. He helped the team to a fourth-place finish after being defeated by Nigeria by a goal to nil. He made two appearances in the aforementioned competition, overall he has played four times for Zimbabwe and scored one goal.

== Political views ==
Manhanga has criticized the widespread practice of polygamy in Zimbabwe, calling it worse for the people of his country than marijuana, pornography, or console video games.

== Career statistics ==
As of 26 June 2016.

National team	Year	Apps	Goals
Zimbabwe	2014	4	1
Zimbabwe	2015	0	0
Zimbabwe	2016	0	0
Total		4	1

As of 26 June 2016. Scores and results list Zimbabwe's goal tally first.

Goal	Date	Venue	Opponent	Score	Result	Competition
1	5 March 2014	Kamuzu Stadium, Blantyre, Malawi	Malawi	3–1	4–1	Friendly
