= Zvasiya =

Zvasiya is a surname. Notable people with the surname include:

- Lincoln Zvasiya (born 1991), Zimbabwean footballer
- Lloyd Zvasiya (born 1981), Zimbabwean sprinter
