= 2001 COSAFA Cup =

Tournament details
- Teams: 12 (from 1 confederation)

Final positions
- Champions: Angola (2nd title)
- Runners-up: Zimbabwe

Tournament statistics
- Matches played: 12
- Goals scored: 18 (1.5 per match)

This page provides summaries to the 2001 COSAFA Cup.

== First round ==
Winners of the first round advanced to the quarter-finals.

Feb 11, 2001

Swaziland	0–0 (2–1 pen.)	Zambia

Somhlolo National Stadium, Lobamba
Mar 17, 2001

Botswana	0–1	Malawi
		Essau Kanyenda 75'

Botswana National Stadium, Gaborone
Apr 8, 2001

Mauritius	1–0	Namibia
Kersley Appou 87'

Stade Anjalay, Pamplemousses
Apr 29, 2001

Mozambique	0–3	South Africa
		Pollen Ndlanya 25'; Nkosinathi Nhleko 68'; Clement Mazibuko 89'

Estádio do Maxaquene, Maputo

== Quarter-finals ==
Zimbabwe (holders), Angola, Lesotho, Zambia received byes into quarter-finals.

June 10, 2001

Angola	1–0	Mauritius
Quinzinho 12'

Estádio da Cidadela, Luanda
June 24, 2001

Lesotho	1–2	Zambia
Teele Ntsonyana 57'		Harry Milanzi 18'; Gift Kampamba 48'

Setsoto Stadium, Maseru
July 8, 2001

Zimbabwe	2–1	Swaziland
Ronald Sibanda 26'; Luke Jukulile 56'		Wonder Nhleko 72'

National Stadium, Harare
July 21, 2001

Malawi	1–0	South Africa
Patrick Mabedi 83' (pen.)

Chichiri Stadium, Blantyre

== Semi-finals ==
Aug 18, 2001

Zambia	1–1 (2–4 pen.)	Angola
Chaswe Nsofwa 36'		Akwá 11'

Chichiri Stadium, Blantyre
Aug 25, 2001

Malawi	0–2	Zimbabwe
		Edzai Kasinauyo 21'; Maxwell Dube 58'

Chichiri Stadium, Blantyre

== Final ==
Sep 16, 2001

Angola	0–0	Zimbabwe

Estádio da Cidadela, Luanda
Sep 30, 2001

Zimbabwe	0–1	Angola
		Flávio 87'

National Stadium, Harare

2001 COSAFA Cup

Angola
Second title
