= Devon Chafa =

Zimbabwean footballer (born 1990)

Personal information
- Full name: Devon Chafa Taitamba
- Date of birth: 25 December 1990 (age 35)
- Place of birth: Harare, Zimbabwe
- Height: 1.82 m (5 ft 11 1/2 in)
- Position: Defender

Team information
- Current team: CAPS United FC

Youth career
- DC Academy

Senior career*
Years	Team	Apps	(Gls)
2011–2015	Dynamos		
2015–2016	How Mine		
2016–2017	CAPS United		
2018	Buildcon		
2018–2019	Platinum		
2020–2022	Ngezi Platinum		
2022-	CAPS United	8	(0)

International career^{‡}
2013–	Zimbabwe	14	(0)
- * Club domestic league appearances and goals as of 2/6/25 @ 16:57PM(AEST) ‡ National team caps and goals as of 22:10, 9 July 2020 (UTC)

Devon Chafa Taitamba (born 25 December 1990) is a Zimbabwean footballer who plays as a defender for Ngezi Platinum and the Zimbabwe national team.

== Club career ==
Chafa began his career with Dynamos, his spell with Dynamos was mainly a success as he left in 2015 following four Zimbabwe Premier Soccer League medals and two Mbada Diamonds Cup medals but he did suffer a thirty-day suspension after testing positive for a banned substance by FIFA in 2013. The reasoning behind his departure in 2015 was that new Dynamos manager David Mandigora did not renew his contract. After leaving in 2015, Chafa signed for How Mine with whom he remained with until 2016 when he joined CAPS United. He left CAPS in December 2017.

Two months later, Chafa signed for Zambian Premier League side Buildcon. Buildcon released Chafa in August 2018. He returned to Zimbabwe with Platinum a month later. 2020 saw Chafa join Ngezi Platinum.

== International career ==
Chafa's first two competitive international caps came in qualifying for the 2014 FIFA World Cup against Egypt and Guinea.

== Personal life ==
During the COVID-19 pandemic, Chafa was accused on breaking lockdown rules by playing local "money games" with amateur footballers in Budiriro. Chafa denied these claims, though his Ngezi Platinum manager Rodwell Dhlakama publicly condemned him for the games.

== Career statistics ==
As of 9 July 2020.

National team	Year	Apps	Goals
Zimbabwe	2013	11	0
Zimbabwe	2017	3	0
Total		14	0

== Honours ==
Dynamos

- Zimbabwe Premier Soccer League (4): 2011, 2012, 2013, 2014
- Mbada Diamonds Cup (2): 2011, 2012

CAPS United

- Zimbabwe Premier Soccer League: 2016

Platinum

- Zimbabwe Premier Soccer League: 2018
