= Milton Ncube =

Zimbabwean footballer (born 1987)

Personal information
- Date of birth: 4 March 1987 (age 39)
- Place of birth: Harare, Zimbabwe
- Height: 1.78 m (5 ft 10 in)
- Positions: Left-back; forward

Team information
- Current team: Harare City

Senior career*
Years	Team	Apps	(Gls)
2008–2010	Shooting Stars	?	(?)
2010–2012	Motor Action	?	(?)
2012–2014	Highlanders	?	(?)
2014–2016	Ajax Cape Town	20	(1)
2016–2018	How Mine	?	(?)
2018–2019	CAPS United	?	(?)
2019–	Harare City	?	(?)
2019– date	Whitworth	92	(8)

International career^{‡}
2014–	Zimbabwe	11	(1)
- * Club domestic league appearances and goals as of 18 March 2019 ‡ National team caps and goals as of 27 June 2016

Milton Ncube (born 4 March 1987) is a Zimbabwean professional footballer who plays as a left-back or forward for Wellingborough Whitworth. He has represented the Zimbabwe national team internationally.

== Club career ==
Ncube started his career with Shooting Stars in 2008, before moving to Motor Action two years later. After another two years with Motor Action, during which he won the 2010 Zimbabwe Premier Soccer League title, he departed the club to sign for Highlanders before subsequently moving to a club outside of Zimbabwe for the first time when he agreed to join Ajax Cape Town of South Africa in 2014. On 8 July 2016, he was released by Ajax Cape Town.

== International career ==
In January 2014, coach Ian Gorowa, invited him to be a part of the Zimbabwe national team squad for the 2014 African Nations Championship. He helped the team to a fourth-place finish after being defeated by Nigeria by a goal to nil. He made seven appearances at the 2014 African Nations Championship, in total Ncube has played for Zimbabwe 11 times and scored one goal (versus Gabon).

== Career statistics ==
=== Club ===
As of 27 June 2016

Appearances and goals by club, season and competition
Club	Season	League			National cup		League cup		Continental		Other		Total	
Club	Season	Division	Apps	Goals	Apps	Goals	Apps	Goals	Apps	Goals	Apps	Goals	Apps	Goals
Ajax Cape Town	2014–15	Premier Soccer League	11	1	0	0	0	0	—		0 (Note: Appearance in MTN 8)	0	11	1
Ajax Cape Town	2015–16	Premier Soccer League	9	0	0	0	0	0	0 (Note: Appearance in CAF Champions League)	0	1	0	10	0
Ajax Cape Town	Total		20	1	0	0	0	0	0	0	1	0	21	1
Career total			20	1	0	0	0	0	0	0	1	0	21	1

=== International ===
As of 27 June 2016

Appearances and goals by national team and year
National team	Year	Apps	Goals
Zimbabwe	2013	5	0
Zimbabwe	2014	10	1
Zimbabwe	2015	1	0
Zimbabwe	2016	0	0
Total		16	1

As of 27 June 2016
Scores and results list Zimbabwe's goal tally first, score column indicates score after each Ncube goal.

List of international goals scored by Milton Ncube
No.	Date	Venue	Opponent	Score	Result	Competition
1	7 January 2014	Rand Stadium, Johannesburg, South Africa	Gabon	2–0	2–0	Friendly

== Honours ==
Motor Action

- Zimbabwe Premier Soccer League: 2010

Highlanders

- Mbada Diamonds Cup: 2013

Ajax Cape Town

- MTN 8: 2015
