= Cuthbert Malajila =

Zimbabwean footballer (born 1985)

Personal information
- Full name: Cuthbert Lifasi Malajila
- Date of birth: 3 October 1985 (age 41)
- Place of birth: Rimuka, Kadoma, Zimbabwe
- Height: 1.79 m (5 ft 10 1/2 in)
- Position: Forward

Team information
- Current team: Black Leopards
- Number: 28

Youth career
- Western Pirates
- Young Swallows
- 2004: David Whitehead

Senior career*
Years	Team	Apps	(Gls)
2005–2007	Chapungu United	29	(25)
2007–2008	Highlanders	42	(16)
2008–2010	Dynamos	20	(27)
2010–2011	Club Africain	4	(0)
2011	→ Al Akhdar (loan)		(1)
2011	Dynamos		(4)
2012–2013	Maritzburg United	41	(15)
2013–2019	Mamelodi Sundowns	64	(18)
2016–2017	→ Bidvest Wits (loan)	25	(4)
2019–	Black Leopards	4	(0)

International career^{‡}
2008–	Zimbabwe	31	(9)
- * Club domestic league appearances and goals as of 23:22, 19 November 2019 (UTC) ‡ National team caps and goals as of 6 March 2017

Cuthbert Malajila (3 October 1985 in Rimuka Kadoma, Mashonaland West) is a Zimbabwean footballer who plays as a forward for Premier Soccer League side Black Leopards in South Africa. He also plays for the Zimbabwe national football team.

== Career ==
=== Club ===
He started at Chapungu United before moving in 2006 to Highlanders and then to Dynamos Harare. While playing for Highlanders, he scored a hat-trick in a match against Masvingo United, with Highlanders winning the match 4–0. He won the Golden Boot in the top division of Zimbabwean football in 2007.

Malajila had a trial at Belgian club Cercle Brugge, but it ended with the club declining to offer him a contract. He returned to Zimbabwe and to Dynamos afterward, and stated that his focus would be on winning the Golden Boot and in helping his club. He stated that his long-term dream was still on earning a transfer abroad. The striker left his native Zimbabwe in summer 2010 and signed a professional contract of 3 years with the Tunisian side Club Africain in August 2010.

Malajila became the first Zimbabwean to play professional football in Libya after signing for First Division side Al Akhdar on a six-month loan. On 22 January 2012, he completed a move to South African Premier Soccer League side Maritzburg United after the two parties agreed on a transfer fee for the player. In July 2013, Malajila agreed to join Mamelodi Sundowns. He made his Sundowns debut in the following August against Bloemfontein Celtic and scored his first goal for the club in the same match.

=== International ===
As of June 2016, Malajila has made 17 appearances for the Zimbabwe national team. His debut came in 2008 in a 2010 FIFA World Cup/2010 Africa Cup of Nations qualifier against Guinea. He scored his first goal for Zimbabwe on his second cap against Namibia, also a 2010 qualifier.

== Career statistics ==
=== Club ===
As of 18 June 2016.

Statistics
Club	Season	League			National Cup (Note: Includes the Nedbank Cup)		League Cup (Note: Includes the Telkom Knockout)		Continental (Note: Includes the CAF Champions League)		Other (Note: Includes the MTN 8)		Total	
Club	Season	Division	Apps	Goals	Apps	Goals	Apps	Goals	Apps	Goals	Apps	Goals	Apps	Goals
Mamelodi Sundowns	2013–14	Premier Soccer League	22	6	1	0	2	0	—		0	0	25	6
Mamelodi Sundowns	2014–15	Premier Soccer League	26	10	5	0	3	0	0	0	0	0	34	10
Mamelodi Sundowns	2015–16	Premier Soccer League	13	2	2	1	1	0	0	0	1 (Note: One appearance in 2015 MTN 8)	0	17	3
Mamelodi Sundowns	Total		61	18	8	1	6	0	0	0	1	0	76	19
Career total			61	18	8	1	6	0	0	0	1	0	76	19

=== International ===
As of 18 June 2016.

National team	Year	Apps	Goals
Zimbabwe	2008	6	2
Zimbabwe	2009	5	4
Zimbabwe	2010	2	0
Zimbabwe	2011	2	0
Zimbabwe	2012	1	0
Zimbabwe	2013	3	1
Zimbabwe	2014	2	0
Zimbabwe	2015	2	1
Zimbabwe	2016	4	1
Zimbabwe	2017	3	0
Total		31	9

=== International goals ===
As of 18 June 2016. Scores and results list Zimbabwe's goal tally first.

Goal	Date	Venue	Opponent	Score	Result	Competition
1	26 March 2008	Botswana National Stadium, Gaborone, Botswana	Namibia	2–4	2–4	Friendly
2	12 October 2008	Sam Nujoma Stadium, Windhoek, Namibia	Namibia	2–4	2–4	2010 FIFA World Cup qualification
3	17 October 2009	Rufaro Stadium, Harare, Zimbabwe	Mauritius	1–0	3–0	2009 COSAFA Cup
4	17 October 2009	Rufaro Stadium, Harare, Zimbabwe	Mauritius	2–0	3–0	2009 COSAFA Cup
5	19 October 2009	Rufaro Stadium, Harare, Zimbabwe	Lesotho	1–0	2–2	2009 COSAFA Cup
6	1 November 2009	Rufaro Stadium, Harare, Zimbabwe	Zambia	3–1	3–1	2009 COSAFA Cup
7	10 September 2013	Orlando Stadium, Johannesburg, South Africa	South Africa	2–0	2–1	Friendly
8	13 June 2015	Kamuzu Stadium, Blantyre, Malawi	Malawi	1–0	2–1	2017 Africa Cup of Nations qualification
9	5 June 2016	National Sports Stadium, Harare, Zimbabwe	Malawi	3–0	3–0	2017 Africa Cup of Nations qualification

== Honours ==
=== Club ===
Club Africain

- North African Cup of Champions (1): 2010

Dynamos

- Zimbabwe Premier Soccer League (1): 2011
- Cup of Zimbabwe (1): 2011

Mamelodi Sundowns

- Premier Soccer League (2): 2013–14, 2015–16
- Nedbank Cup (1): 2014–15
- Telkom Knockout (1): 2015

Bidvest Wits fc ( Premier soccer League) 1 2016/17 (Mtn cup ) 1 2016/2017
