= Partson Jaure =

Zimbabwean footballer (born 1990)

Personal information
- Full name: Partson Jaure
- Date of birth: July 8, 1990 (age 36)
- Place of birth: Harare, Zimbabwe
- Height: 1.74 m (5 ft 8 1/2 in)
- Position: Defender

Team information
- Current team: Dynamos Harare

Youth career
- Dynamos Harare

Senior career*
Years	Team	Apps	(Gls)
2010–2014	Dynamos Harare		
2014–2016	University of Pretoria	48	(1)
2016–2017	Ngezi Platinum		
2018	Buildcon		
2019	Manica Diamonds		
2020–	Dynamos Harare		

International career^{‡}
2012–	Zimbabwe	33	(2)
- * Club domestic league appearances and goals as of 29 June 2016 ‡ National team caps and goals as of 28 January 2021

Partson Jaure (born July 8, 1990) is a Zimbabwean professional footballer, who plays as a defender for Zimbabwe national team. On club level, he is currently a free agent following his release from the University of Pretoria.

== Career ==
=== Club ===
Dynamos were Jaure's first club, he began in the youth team before being promoted to the first-team. During his four years with Dynamos he won six trophies, including three Zimbabwe Premier Soccer League titles in a row. 2014 saw Jaure leave Zimbabwe for South Africa as he agreed to join the University of Pretoria. He made 24 league appearances in both his first and his second seasons with the club, including scoring a goal in November 2014 versus Moroka Swallows. At the end of his second season with Tuks the club was relegated via the 2015–16 play-offs, and Jaure was subsequently released at the end of the season. In March 2020, Jaure was involved in an accident

=== International ===
Jaure's Zimbabwe debut came in a 2014 FIFA World Cup qualifier against Egypt on 26 March 2013. He made a total of three appearances in Zimbabwe's unsuccessful World Cup qualifying campaign. In January 2014, coach Ian Gorowa, invited him to be a part of the Zimbabwe squad for the 2014 African Nations Championship. He helped the team to a fourth-place finish after being defeated by Nigeria by a goal to nil. He made a total of six appearances in the competition.

== Career statistics ==
=== Club ===
As of 29 June 2016.

Statistics
Club	Season	League			National Cup (Note: Includes the Nedbank Cup)		League Cup (Note: Includes the Telkom Knockout)		Continental (Note: Includes the CAF Champions League)		Other (Note: Includes the MTN 8 and National First Division play-offs)		Total	
Club	Season	Division	Apps	Goals	Apps	Goals	Apps	Goals	Apps	Goals	Apps	Goals	Apps	Goals
University of Pretoria	2014–15	Premier Soccer League	24	1	2	0	1	0	—		0	0	27	1
University of Pretoria	2015–16	Premier Soccer League	24	0	2	0	1	0	—		2 (Note: Two appearances in the 2015–16 National First Division play-offs)	0	29	0
University of Pretoria	Total		48	1	4	0	2	0	0	0	2	0	56	1
Career total			48	1	4	0	2	0	0	0	2	0	56	1

=== International ===
As of 24 January 2021.

National team	Year	Apps	Goals
Zimbabwe	2012	1	0
Zimbabwe	2013	9	0
Zimbabwe	2014	9	0
Zimbabwe	2015	5	0
Zimbabwe	2016	0	0
Zimbabwe	2017	2	0
Zimbabwe	2018	0	0
Zimbabwe	2019	5	1
Zimbabwe	2020	0	0
Zimbabwe	2021	2	1
Total		33	2

=== International goals ===
Scores and results list Zimbabwe's goal tally first.

No.	Date	Venue	Opponent	Score	Result	Competition
1.	22 September 2019	National Sports Stadium, Harare, Zimbabwe	Lesotho	2–0	3–1	2020 African Nations Championship qualification
2.	20 January 2021	Stade Ahmadou Ahidjo, Yaoundé, Cameroon	Burkina Faso	1–1	1–3	2020 African Nations Championship

== Honours ==
=== Club ===
Dynamos (2020-)

- Zimbabwean Independence Trophy (1): 2010
- Zimbabwe Premier Soccer League (3): 2011, 2012, 2013
- Mbada Diamonds Cup (2): 2011, 2012
