= Martin Vengesayi =

Zimbabwean footballer (born 1987)

Personal information
- Date of birth: 18 November 1987 (age 38)
- Place of birth: Masvingo, Zimbabwe
- Height: 1.82 m (6 ft 0 in)
- Position: Midfielder

Team information
- Current team: Harare City

Senior career*
Years	Team	Apps	(Gls)
2008	Masvingo United		
2009	Monomotapa United		
2010	Kiglon		
2011–2012	Dynamos		
2013–	Harare City		

International career^{‡}
2010	Zimbabwe	1	(0)
- * Club domestic league appearances and goals as of 14 November 2020 ‡ National team caps and goals as of 14 November 2020

Martin Vengesayi (born 18 November 1987) is a Zimbabwean football midfielder who currently plays for Harare City.
