= Lincoln Zvasiya =

Zimbabwean footballer (born 1991)

Personal information
- Date of birth: 25 February 1991 (age 35)
- Place of birth: Harare, Zimbabwe
- Position: Defender

Team information
- Current team: CAPS United

Youth career
- Aces Youth Soccer Academy

Senior career*
Years	Team	Apps	(Gls)
–2011	Monomotapa United		
2011	FC Platinum		
2011–2014	Kaizer Chiefs	25	(1)
2013–2014	→ OFI (loan)	8	(0)
2015	Harare City		
2016	ZPC Kariba		
2017	Dynamos Harare		
2018	Yadah Stars		
2019–	CAPS United		

International career^{‡}
2011–	Zimbabwe	6	(1)
- * Club domestic league appearances and goals as of 08:07, 2 July 2016 (UTC) ‡ National team caps and goals as of 08:07, 2 July 2016 (UTC)

Lincoln Zvasiya (born 25 February 1991) is a Zimbabwean professional footballer, who plays as a defender for CAPS United and the Zimbabwe national team.

== Career ==
=== Club ===
Born in Harare, Zvasiya began his career with the Aces Youth Soccer Academy. After leaving Aces Youth he joined his first senior club when he signed for 2008 Zimbabwe Premier Soccer League winners Monomotapa United. After a year with Monomotapa, Zvasiya had a short stint with Platinum before leaving them in the middle of 2013 to join South African club Kaizer Chiefs.

With Kaizer Chiefs he won the 2012–13 Premier Soccer League and the 2012–13 Nedbank Cup before departing on loan to join Greek side OFI in July 2013. He returned to Kaizer Chiefs in December 2013 but was released nine months later. After spending September to December 2014 without a club, Zvasiya agreed to join Harare City in 2015 but was released a few months later. In 2016, Zvasiya joined ZPC Kariba.

=== International ===
Zvasiya has won six caps and scored one goal for the Zimbabwe national team, with his debut coming in a friendly against Zambia in 2011. Three more appearances went past before he scored his first goal for his nation in a 2014 FIFA World Cup qualifying defeat to Egypt.

In October 2012, Zvasiya was cleared of match fixing charges that came about from Asiagate.

== Career statistics ==
=== International ===
As of 2 July 2016.

National team	Year	Apps	Goals
Zimbabwe	2011	3	0
Zimbabwe	2012	0	0
Zimbabwe	2013	3	1
Zimbabwe	2014	0	0
Zimbabwe	2015	0	0
Zimbabwe	2016	0	0
Total		6	1

=== International goals ===
As of 2 July 2016. Scores and results list Zimbabwe's goal tally first.

Goal	Date	Venue	Opponent	Score	Result	Competition
1	9 June 2013	National Sports Stadium, Harare, Zimbabwe	Egypt	2–3	2–4	2014 FIFA World Cup qualification

== Honours ==
=== Club ===
Kaizer Chiefs

- Premier Soccer League (1): 2012–13
- Nedbank Cup (1): 2012–13
