= Ronald Sibanda =

Zimbabwean footballer (born 1976)

Personal information
- Full name: Ronald Sibanda
- Date of birth: 29 August 1976 (age 50)
- Position: Midfielder

Senior career*
Years	Team	Apps	(Gls)
1997–1998	Śląsk Wrocław	1	(0)
1998–1999	Dynamos		
1999–2000	Zimbabwe Saints		
2001–2005	Amazulu		
2006	Highlanders		
2007	Njube Sundowns		
2007–2009	Kaizer Chiefs		

International career
1997–2007	Zimbabwe		
- * Club domestic league appearances and goals

Ronald Sibanda (born 29 August 1976) is a Zimbabwean former professional footballer who played as a midfielder. A Zimbabwe international, he played at the abuse 2000, 2001, 2003, 2004, 2005 and 2006 COSAFA Cup and the 2004 African Cup of Nations.
