= Simba Sithole (footballer, born 1989) =

Zimbabwean footballer

Personal information
- Full name: Simbarashe Sithole
- Date of birth: 5 May 1989 (age 37)
- Place of birth: Masvingo, Zimbabwe
- Position: Forward

Team information
- Current team: Karoi United

Senior career*
Years	Team	Apps	(Gls)
2007	How Mine		
2008	Monomotapa United		
2009	Railstars		
2010	Hippo Valley		
2011–2014	How Mine		
2014	Ajax Cape Town	7	(0)
2014–2015	Highlanders		
2015	Bulawayo City		
2016	Technosphere		
2017	Shooting Stars		
2018	Yadah Stars		
2019–	Karoi United		

International career^{‡}
2014	Zimbabwe	5	(1)
- * Club domestic league appearances and goals as of 14 November 2020 ‡ National team caps and goals as of 14 November 2020

Simbarashe "Simba" Sithole (born 5 May 1989 in Masvingo) is a Zimbabwean footballer. He plays for the Zimbabwe national team.

== Career ==
=== Club ===
Sithole began his career in Zimbabwe with How Mine, before subsequently joining Monomotapa United, Railstars and Hippo Valley. After spells with the aforementioned three clubs, Sithole rejoined How Mine. His return to How Mine led to a move to South African football. Firstly, a trial with AmaZulu in 2013 and then a permanent transfer to Ajax Cape Town in January 2014. Eight months later he left Ajax to return to Zimbabwe to play for Highlanders, however he left the Bulawayo-based club soon after. A short stint with Bulawayo City followed.

=== International ===
In January 2014, coach Ian Gorowa, invited him to be a part of the Zimbabwe squad for the 2014 African Nations Championship. He helped the team to a fourth-place finish after being defeated by Nigeria by a goal to nil.

Sithole scored his first international goal for the Zimbabwe national team in a 2014 African Nations Championship qualifier against Mauritius. He appeared for Zimbabwe against Gabon on 6 January 2014, and he scored his second goal for his country on 25 January 2014 against Mali. He was named in the Zimbabwe squad for the 2014 African Nations Championship alongside his then namesake Simba Sithole.

== Career statistics ==
=== International ===
Zimbabwe
Year	Apps	Goals
2014	5	1

Statistics accurate as of match played 1 February 2014.

=== International goals ===
Updated to match played 25 January 2014. Scores and results list Zimbabwe's goal tally first.

#	Date	Venue	Opponent	Score	Result	Competition
2	25 January 2014	Cape Town Stadium, Cape Town, South Africa	Mali	1–0	2–1	2014 African Nations Championship

== Honours ==
Monomotapa United

- Zimbabwe Premier Soccer League: 2008
