= Rodwell Chinyengetere =

Zimbabwean association football player (born 1988)

Personal information
- Date of birth: 8 March 1988 (age 38)
- Place of birth: Kadoma, Zimbabwe
- Height: 1.79 m (5 ft 10 in)
- Position: Attacking midfielder

Team information
- Current team: CAPS United
- Number: 10

Senior career*
Years	Team	Apps	(Gls)
2009	Zimbabwe Saints		
2010–2016	Hwange		
2016–2019	Platinum		
2019	Baroka	7	(0)
2019–2020	→ Platinum (loan)		
2021	Platinum		
2022-	CAPS United		

International career^{‡}
2012–	Zimbabwe	8	(2)
- * Club domestic league appearances and goals as of 20:04, 7 December 2019 (UTC) ‡ National team caps and goals as of 16 February 2019

Rodwell Chinyengetere (born 8 March 1988) is a Zimbabwean footballer who plays as a midfielder for CAPS United and the Zimbabwe national football team.

== Club career ==
Chinyengetere moved abroad to play for South African side Baroka in 2019, only to be loaned back to Platinum in July 2019. He signed permanently for them in January 2021.

He joined CAPS United in 2022 after his contract with Platinum was not renewed.
