= Pardon Chinungwa =

Zimbabwean footballer (born 1983)

Personal information
- Date of birth: 28 October 1983 (age 43)
- Position: Defender

Senior career*
Years	Team	Apps	(Gls)
2005–2006	Masvingo United		
2007–2012	Gunners		
2013	Triangle		
2014–2015	ZPC Kariba		
2017–2018	Bikita Minerals		

International career^{‡}
2012	Zimbabwe	1	(0)
- * Club domestic league appearances and goals as of 15 November 2020 ‡ National team caps and goals as of 15 November 2020

Pardon Chinungwa (born 28 October 1983) is a retired Zimbabwean football defender.
