= Erick Chipeta =

Zimbabwean footballer (born 1990)

Personal information
- Full name: Erick Chipeta
- Date of birth: 28 June 1990 (age 36)
- Place of birth: Bulawayo, zimbabwe
- Height: 1.86 m (6 ft 1 in)
- Positions: Defender; midfielder

Youth career
- DST Rangers F.C.
- Sprouting Academy F.C.

Senior career*
Years	Team	Apps	(Gls)
2012–2014	Hwange Colliery		
2014–2016	Chippa United	40	(4)
2016–2017	Ajax Cape Town	11	(1)
2018	Al-Raed	0	(0)

International career^{‡}
2013–	Zimbabwe	9	(0)
- * Club domestic league appearances and goals as of 29 June 2016 ‡ National team caps and goals as of 29 June 2016

Erick Chipeta (born June 28, 1990) is a Zimbabwean professional footballer who plays as a defender and midfielder for the Zimbabwe national team.

== Career ==
=== Club ===
Chipeta started his career in Zimbabwe with Hwange Colliery, where he remained for two years before leaving his homeland for South Africa for the first time. 2014 saw Chipeta join newly promoted Premier Soccer League side Chippa United. He made his debut for Chippa in a 1–1 draw at home to Mamelodi Sundowns on 22 October. In total he made 18 appearances and scored 1 goal in his first season with Chippa. In his second season, he scored 3 goals in 25 appearances. In April 2016, ahead of the 2016–17 season, Chipeta agreed to join Ajax Cape Town.

=== International ===
Chipeta made his debut for the Zimbabwe national team on 16 June 2013 in a 2014 FIFA World Cup qualifier versus Guinea. He made two more appearances for his nation in 2013. In January 2014, coach Ian Gorowa, invited him to be a part of the Zimbabwe squad for the 2014 African Nations Championship. He helped the team to a fourth-place finish after being defeated by Nigeria by a goal to nil.

== Career statistics ==
=== Club ===
As of 29 June 2016.

Statistics
Club	Season	League			National Cup (Note: Includes the Nedbank Cup)		League Cup (Note: Includes the Telkom Knockout)		Continental (Note: Includes the CAF Confederation Cup)		Other (Note: Includes the MTN 8)		Total	
Club	Season	Division	Apps	Goals	Apps	Goals	Apps	Goals	Apps	Goals	Apps	Goals	Apps	Goals
Chippa United	2014–15	Premier Soccer League	17	1	1	0	0	0	—		0	0	18	1
Chippa United	2015–16	Premier Soccer League	23	3	1	0	1	0	—		0	0	25	3
Chippa United	Total		40	4	2	0	1	0	—		0	0	43	4
Ajax Cape Town	2016–17	Premier Soccer League	0	0	0	0	0	0	0	0	0	0	0	0
Ajax Cape Town	Total		0	0	0	0	0	0	0	0	0	0	0	0
Career total			40	4	2	0	1	0	0	0	0	0	43	4

=== International ===
As of 29 June 2016.

National team	Year	Apps	Goals
Zimbabwe	2013	3	0
Zimbabwe	2014	6	0
Zimbabwe	2015	0	0
Zimbabwe	2016	0	0
Total		9	0
