= Masvingo United F.C. =

Zimbabwean football club

Masvingo FC
- Full name: Masvingo FC
- Nickname(s): Yuna Yuna, Asipo Haapo, The Busmen
- Founded: 2019; 6 years ago
- Ground: Mucheke Stadium; Masvingo, Zimbabwe
- Capacity: 10,000
- Chairman: Hubert Fidze
- Manager: Chris Mahofa
- League: Zifa eastern region division one
- 2015: 2nd
Home colours	Away colours

Masvingo United is a Zimbabwean football club. It is based in Masvingo. They joined the Zimbabwe Premier Soccer League, (the first tier league) They were repeatedly relegated to Division One. The club used to be bankrolled by Tanda Tavaruva.

== History ==
The years 2009–2010 were spent in ZIFA Eastern region division 1. During this time, Tavaruva was not sponsoring the club. During this period, initially, Mutema, in partnership with a South African drink making company, Zimanzi, sponsored the club, naming the club Zimanzi Masvingo FC. At the end of the 2010 season the club was promoted to the Premier league. The same year Zimanzi pulled out of the sponsorship deal. Entering the premiership at the beginning of the 2011 season, Mutema sponsored the club, then named Masvingo United FC.

Financial troubles besiege the club again. Mutema did not have the capacity to sponsor the club on his own. The new owner of the Masvingo Division 1 club Setheo United sponsored Masvingo United. Disagreements between this new sponsor and Mutema led to the Setheo United sponsor forming his own club – Setheo United. Masvingo was relegated again at the end of the 2011 season. In 2012 Masvingo United was fifth on the ZIFA Eastern Region Division 1 log after Triangle United F.C., Hippo Valley, Setheo and Mutare City.

Since the 2005 Mavingo United landed among the top 4 best supported and performing clubs in Zimbabwe. They lost the championship battle to CAPS United on the last day, in the 2005 season and ended the season on position 2. In the 2006 season, Masvingo United completed the season on position 3, trailing Champions Highlanders and runners up, Motor Action. Masvingo United came fourth in revenues in the Zimbabwean top league, after Highlanders, CAPS & Dynamos.

On 10 March 2019, Masvingo United and Masvingo Pirates have merged to form Masvingo FC with high hopes of bringing back Premier Soccer League games to the Ancient City.

== Achievements ==
- ZIFA Unity Cup: 2

2002, 2005

- Zimbabwean Independence Trophy: 2

2006, 2007

- OK Woza Bhora: 1

2005

== Performance in CAF competitions ==
- CAF Cup Winners' Cup: 1 appearance

2003 – Preliminary Round

== Squad ==
Note: Flags indicate national team as defined under FIFA eligibility rules; some limited exceptions apply. Players may hold more than one non-FIFA nationality.

No.	Pos.	Nation	Player
-	GK	ZIM	Tafadzwa Dube
-	DF	ZIM	Godfrey Dondo
-	DF	ZIM	Progress Musepa
-	DF	ZIM	George Magariro
-	DF	ZIM	Pardon Chinungwa
-	MF	ZIM	Ovidy Karuru
-	MF	ZIM	Milton Makopa
-	MF	ZIM	Wonder Sithole

No.	Pos.	Nation	Player
-	MF	ZIM	Robson Tswaki
-	MF	ZIM	Cyprian Muchabaya
-	MF	ZIM	Tapiwa Khumbuyani
-	FW	ZIM	Martin Vengesayi
-	FW	ZIM	Johnson Zimbabe
-	FW	ZIM	Lloyd Hlahla
-	FW	ZIM	Simba Gate
-	FW	ZIM	Douglas Zimbango

== Coaches ==
Charles Mhlauri had a largely unsuccessful stint as Head Coach for Masvingo United. He left the club facing relegation. Fewdays Musonda, the late Lovemore Nyabeze (twice), the late Gombera, Angirayi Chapo, Saul Chaminuka & Tavaka Gumbo (as caretaker coach) are notable past coaches for Masvingo United. Luke Masomere guided Masvingo United to a second position finish on the league log in the 2005 season & won 3 major cup competitions in years 2005 and 2006. He is the most successful coach for Masvingo United to-date. With Luke Masomere in charge, Masvingo earned the "Cup Kings of Zimbabwe tag". With a few games remaining in the 2006 season, Luke Masomere left Masvingo United for greener pastures to join Gaborone United in Botswana. His assistant Taurai Mangwiro remained in charge of the last few games & guided the team to a third-place finish.
