= 2004 COSAFA Cup =

Tournament details
- Teams: 12 (from 1 confederation)

Final positions
- Champions: Angola (3rd title)
- Runners-up: Zambia

Tournament statistics
- Matches played: 11
- Goals scored: 21 (1.91 per match)

This page provides summaries to the 2004 COSAFA Cup.

== First round ==
Winners of the first round advanced to the quarter-finals.

January 10, 2004

Mauritius	2–0	South Africa
Jacob Lekgetho 53' (o.g.); Christopher Perle 81'

Stade George V, Curepipe
February 28, 2004

Lesotho	0–0 (10–11 pen.)	Botswana

Setsoto Stadium, Maseru
April 18, 2004

Mozambique	2–0	Madagascar
Tico Tico 64'; Fala Fala 89'

Estádio da Machava, Maputo
May 9, 2004

Angola	2–1	Namibia
Love 26', 67'		Jesunh Petrus 70'

Estádio da Cidadela, Luanda

== Quarter-finals ==
The four quarter-finalists of the 2003 edition Zimbabwe, Malawi, Zambia and Swaziland received byes into quarter-finals.

June 13, 2004

Mozambique	2–0	Malawi
Patrick Mabedi 42' (o.g.); To 62'

Estádio da Machava, Maputo
June 27, 2004

Swaziland	0–5^{†}	Zimbabwe
		Edzai Kasinauyo 7'; Peter Ndlovu 41', 58', 81'; Bongani Masangane 54' (o.g.)

Somhlolo National Stadium, Lobamba
July 18, 2004

Angola	1–1 (5–3 pen.)	Botswana
Flávio 4'		Tshepo Motlhabankwe 26'

Estádio da Cidadela, Luanda
July 31, 2004

Zambia	3–1	Mauritius
Jacob Mulenga 11'; Mumamba Numba 55'; Kalusha Bwalya 68'		Kersley Appou 70'

Independence Stadium, Lusaka

Note: † The match between Swaziland and Zimbabwe was abandoned at 0–5 in 83' following crowd trouble; the result stood.

== Semi-finals ==
September 19, 2004

Mozambique	0–1	Angola
		Flávio 68'

Estádio da Machava, Maputo
October 24, 2004

Zimbabwe	0–0 (4–5 pen.)	Zambia

National Stadium, Harare

== Final ==
The final was originally planned for two legs but was reduced to one match for unknown reasons.

November 20, 2004

Zambia	0–0 (a.e.t.) (4–5 pen.)	Angola

Independence Stadium, Lusaka

2004 COSAFA Cup

Angola
Third title
