= Luke Jukulile =

Zimbabwean footballer (born 1973)

Personal information
- Full name: Luke Petros Jukulile
- Date of birth: 5 September 1973 (age 53)
- Position: Midfielder

Senior career*
Years	Team	Apps	(Gls)
1993–1997	CAPS United	67	(10)
1997–2001	Lancashire Steel	86	(27)
2001–2002	Kaizer Chiefs	24	(5)
2002–2004	Dynamos	0	(0)
2004	Shabanie Mine		

International career
2000–2001	Zimbabwe	15	(10)
- * Club domestic league appearances and goals

Luke Petros Jukulile (born 5 September 1973) is a retired Zimbabwean football (soccer) midfielder. He played professionally for Kaizer Chiefs, CAPS United, Lancashire Steel, Dynamos and Shabanie Mine and also represented Zimbabwe.

== Kaizer Chiefs ==
In Jukulile's short spell at Kaizer Chiefs he scored a goal in the CAF Confederation Cup final against Interclube and Patrick Mabedi scored an injury time penalty in the 2nd leg final which they won.

== Career statistics ==
=== International ===
Scores and results list Zimbabwe's goal tally first, score column indicates score after each Jukulile goal.

List of international goals scored by Luke Jukulile
No.	Date	Venue	Opponent	Score	Result	Competition
1	23 April 2000	National Sports Stadium, Harare, Zimbabwe	Central African Republic	3–1	3–1	2002 FIFA World Cup qualification
2	14 May 2000	National Sports Stadium, Harare, Zimbabwe	Namibia	1–0	3–2	2000 COSAFA Cup
3	14 May 2000	National Sports Stadium, Harare, Zimbabwe	Namibia	3–0	3–2	2000 COSAFA Cup
4	16 July 2000	Barbourfields Stadium, Bulawayo, Zimbabwe	Seychelles	2–0	6–0	2002 Africa Cup of Nations qualification
5	16 July 2000	Barbourfields Stadium, Bulawayo, Zimbabwe	Seychelles	3–0	6–0	2002 Africa Cup of Nations qualification
6	13 August 2000	Setsoto Stadium, Maseru, Lesotho	Lesotho	3–0	3–0	2000 COSAFA Cup
7	10 March 2001	Barbourfields Stadium, Bulawayo, Zimbabwe	Lesotho	1–0	3–0	2000 COSAFA Cup
8	3 September 2000	National Sports Stadium, Harare, Zimbabwe	DR Congo	1–0	3–2	2002 Africa Cup of Nations qualification
9	3 September 2000	National Sports Stadium, Harare, Zimbabwe	DR Congo	3–2	3–2	2002 Africa Cup of Nations qualification
10	8 July 2001	National Sports Stadium, Harare, Zimbabwe	Swaziland	2–0	2–1	2001 COSAFA Cup
