= Mucheke Stadium =

Coordinates: 20.0768°S 30.8111°E

Mucheke Stadium is a multi-use stadium in Masvingo, Zimbabwe.

It is currently used mostly for football matches and serves as the home stadium for Masvingo United, who play in the top division in Zimbabwean football. The stadium has a capacity of 5,000 people. Masvingo United was established in 1997.
