= Lazarus Muhoni =

Zimbabwean footballer (born 1976)

Personal information
- Date of birth: 31 August 1976 (age 50)
- Position: Midfielder

Senior career*
Years	Team	Apps	(Gls)
–2007	Black Rhinos		
2008	Dynamos		
2009–2016	Black Rhinos		

International career
2002–2004	Zimbabwe	11	(2)
- * Club domestic league appearances and goals

Lazarus Muhoni (born 31 August 1976) is a retired Zimbabwean football midfielder. A Zimbabwe international, he played at the 2003 COSAFA Cup and the 2004 African Cup of Nations.
