= Esrom Nyandoro =

Zimbabwean footballer (born 1980)

Personal information
- Full name: Esrom Nyandoro
- Date of birth: 6 February 1980 (age 46)
- Place of birth: Bulawayo, Southern Rhodesia
- Position: Defensive midfielder

Youth career
- Zimbabwe Saints

Senior career*
| Years | Team | Apps | (Gls) |
| 1999–2001 | Zimbabwe Saints | 53 | (1) |
| 2001–2004 | AmaZulu | 80 | (1) |
| 2004–2014 | Mamelodi Sundowns | 203 | (9) |

International career^{‡}
| 2001–2012 | Zimbabwe | 56 | (5) |
- * Club domestic league appearances and goals as of 15 November 2012 ‡ National team caps and goals as of 14 October 2012

Esrom Nyandoro (born 6 February 1980) is a former Zimbabwean football midfielder. In his native Zimbabwe, Nyandoro is nicknamed "Yellowman".

== Club career ==
Nyandoro grew up in Zimbabwe's second largest city, Bulawayo, and learnt at Mzilikazi High School. He was identified by soccer scouts whilst playing in the Peter Ndlovu invitational under 19 tournament, for Zimbabwe Saints Juniors, which was used to identify and promote talent. As a result of this he signed with AmaZulu, rising through the reserve ranks to being a member of the league championship winning squad.

Nyandoro was then signed by South African club Mamelodi Sundowns in 2004 and was named the PSL Club Rookie of the Year after his debut season.

In the summer of 2006, Nyandoro joined up with English Premier League club Sheffield United for a trial. This was on the recommendation of Peter Ndlovu who had played for the club. Nyandoro was however not signed.

== International career ==
Nyandoro was a member of the Zimbabwean 2004 African Nations Cup team, who finished bottom of their group in the first round of competition, thus failing to secure qualification for the quarter-finals. He scored a superb goal that was voted as the best goal of the tournament. He also participated at the 2006 African Nations Cup.
