= James Matola =

Zimbabwean footballer (born 1977)

Personal information
- Date of birth: 31 May 1977 (age 49)
- Place of birth: Harare, Zimbabwe
- Height: 1.80 m (5 ft 11 in)
- Position: Center back

Senior career*
Years	Team	Apps	(Gls)
2002–2004	Dynamos		
2005–2006	Buymore United		
2006–2007	Supersport United	28	(0)
2007–2010	Free State Stars	53	(1)
2009–2010	→ Carara Kicks (loan)		
2010–2011	Batau		
2011–2012	FC Buffalo		

International career^{‡}
1999–2008	Zimbabwe	34	(1)
- * Club domestic league appearances and goals as of 1 January 2008 ‡ National team caps and goals as of 1 January 2008

James Matola (born 31 May 1977) is a Zimbabwean football defender. He was once a member of the Zimbabwe national football.
