= Flávio Amado =

Angolan footballer (born 1979)

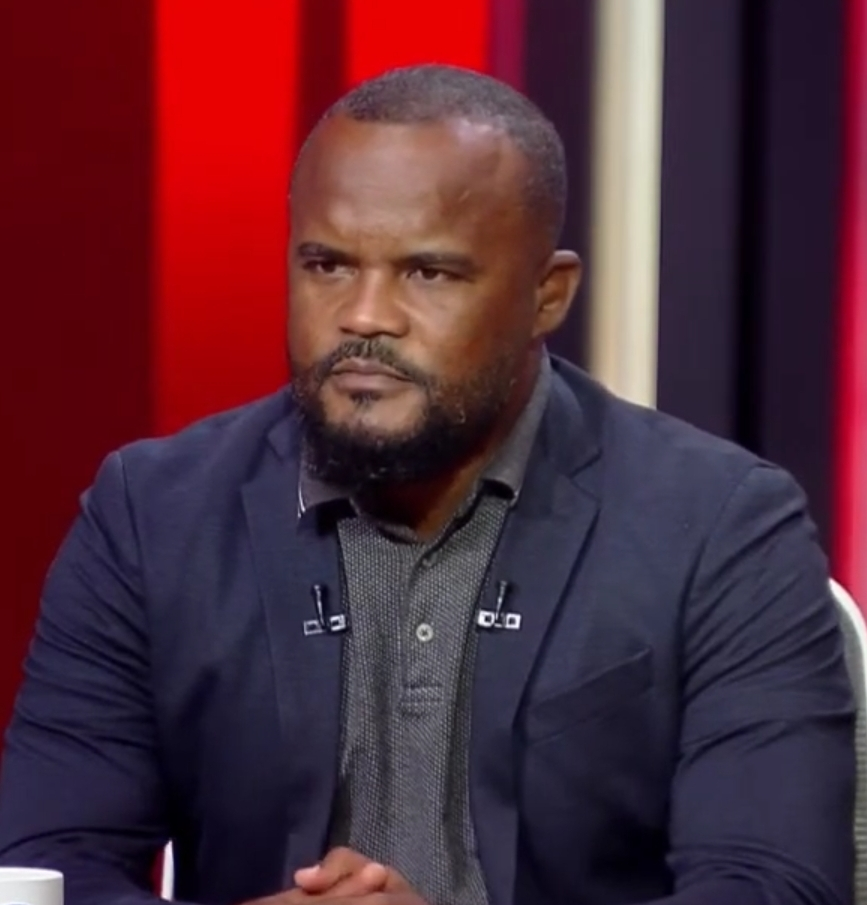
- Flávio in 2022

Personal information
- Full name: Flávio da Silva dos Santos Amado
- Date of birth: 30 December 1979 (age 46)
- Place of birth: Luanda, Angola
- Height: 1.75 m (5 ft 9 in)
- Position: Striker

Youth career
- 1996–1999: Petro Atlético

Senior career*
Years	Team	Apps	(Gls)
1999–2005	Petro Atlético	148	(86)
2005–2009	Al Ahly	96	(35)
2009–2011	Al Shabab	16	(8)
2011–2012	Lierse	5	(1)
2012–2014	Petro Atlético	28	(10)
Total		302	(145)

International career
2000–2012	Angola	91	(34)

Managerial career
- 2024–2025: São Salvador do Congo
- 2025–: Petro de Luanda
- * Club domestic league appearances and goals

Flávio da Silva Amado (born 30 December 1979), better known as Flávio, is an Angolan former professional footballer who played as striker. He is the coach of Angola national under-20 football team.

== Club career ==
Flávio helped his team Al Ahly to participate in the FIFA Club World Championship two successive times in 2005 and 2006.

In the FIFA Club World Championship 2006 opening match against Auckland City FC of New Zealand on 10 December 2006, he scored the first goal, helping Al Ahly to a 2–0 win. In the semi-final on 13 December 2006, Al Ahly faced South American champions Internacional, and Flávio played and scored an equaliser with a header in the second half, but Al Ahly eventually lost the match 1–2.

After having a very unsuccessful first season with the team during which he scored only one goal in the league, and being jeered by fans at many times, most notably when he missed a penalty kick against rivals Zamalek in the African Champions League, Flávio had a very successful second season in 2006–2007, seeing him top the goalscorers chart of the Egyptian Premier League with 17 goals, a single goal ahead of international Egyptian teammate Emad Moteab. He proved to be instrumental in Al Ahly's formation in the next years, scoring many vital goals in critical moments. Generally, Flávio kept an extremely low profile and rarely appears in the media or give any press statements. Such attitude is highly appreciated by his club administration, since it agrees with the club's policies.

In his last season with Al Ahly (2008–2009), Flávio managed to score Al Ahly's only goal during the Egyptian Premier League play-off against Ismaily, handing the title to Al Ahly for the fifth time in row and rewarding himself with the second personal title of the Egyptian Premier League Top Goalscorer, for the third time as a foreign player in the Egyptian Premier League history after John Utaka with Ismaily during the 2000–2001 season, then Flávio himself formerly during the 2006–2007 season.

At his time with Al Ahly he was very well known in Egypt for his heading accuracy, and it was known that Al Ahly played a tactic that Flávio's fellow Angola national football team and Al Ahly teammate Gilberto would play a long ball to him from the sides, and Flávio would score with his head. He did this on multiple occasions, earning Al Ahly multiple titles domestically and continentally.

== International career ==
Flávio was a member of the Angola national team, and was called up to the 2006 FIFA World Cup, in which he scored Angola's only goal of the tournament, with a header against Iran to earn a 1–1 draw. This was Angola's only appearance at a World Cup so far, so Flávio is the only Angolan player to score at a World Cup to date.

He scored three goals for Angola in 2006 African Cup of Nations in Egypt, although they went out in the second round. His goals were against Cameroon and Togo.

== Career statistics ==
=== Club ===
As of 6 December 2023

Appearances and goals by club, season and competition
Club	Season	League			League Cup		Cup		Continental		Other		Total	
Club	Season	Division	Apps	Goals	Apps	Goals	Apps	Goals	Apps	Goals	Apps	Goals	Apps	Goals
Petro de Luanda	1999	Girabola	12	5	–				–		0	0	17	10
Petro de Luanda	2000	Girabola	22	14	–				–		0	0	28	20
Petro de Luanda	2001	Girabola	25	23	–					7 (Note: Appearances in the CAF Champions League)	0	0	30	21
Petro de Luanda	2002	Girabola	24	11	–				3	1	0	0	41	20
Petro de Luanda	2003	Girabola	20	10		1 (Note: Goals in the African Cup Winners' Cup)			–		0	0	42	19
Petro de Luanda	2004	Girabola	24	10		4 (Note: Goals in the CAF Confederation Cup)				3			43	32
Petro de Luanda	2005	Girabola	21	13	–				–		0	0		
Petro de Luanda	2013	Girabola	15	7	–				–		–		16	7
Petro de Luanda	2014	Girabola	13	3	1	2			–		–		16	6
Petro de Luanda	Total		176	96		7				11	0	0		
Al Ahly	2005–06	EPL	20	1	—		1	0	9	3	0	0	33	1
Al Ahly	2006–07	EPL	24	17	—		4	2	14	6	4	2	46	27
Al Ahly	2007–08	EPL	23	5	—		0	0	9	3	1	0	33	8
Al Ahly	2008–09	EPL	29	12	2	0	2	0	13	7	4	3	50	22
Al Ahly	Total		96	35	2	0	7	2	45	19	9	5	159	61
Al Shabab	2009–10	SPL	16	8	—		3	2	7 (Note: Appearances in the AFC Champions League)	5	—		26	15
Lierse	2011–12	BPL	5	1	—		2	0	—		—		7	1

=== International ===
Appearances and goals by national team and year
National team	Year	Apps	Goals
Angola	2000	1	0
Angola	2001	10	2
Angola	2002	5	0
Angola	2003	7	2
Angola	2004	7	3
Angola	2005	8	3
Angola	2006	9	6
Angola	2007	8	5
Angola	2008	13	6
Angola	2009	13	2
Angola	2010	4	3
Angola	2011	2	1
Angola	2012	4	1
Total		91	34

Scores and results list Angola's goal tally first, score column indicates score after each Flávio goal.

List of international goals scored by Flávio
No.	Date	Venue	Opponent	Score	Result	Competition
1	17 June 2001	Estádio Municipal do Tafe, Cabinda, Angola	Burundi	2–1	2–1	2002 Africa Cup of Nations qualification
2	30 September 2001	National Sports Stadium, Harare, Zimbabwe	Zimbabwe	1–0	1–0	2001 COSAFA Cup
3	6 July 2003	Estádio da Cidadela, Luanda, Angola	Malawi	3–0	5–1	2004 Africa Cup of Nations qualification
4	7 September 2003	Estádio da Cidadela, Luanda, Angola	Namibia	2–0	2–0	Friendly
5	18 July 2004	Estádio da Cidadela, Luanda, Angola	Botswana	1–1	1–1 (5–3 pen.)	2004 COSAFA Cup
6	19 September 2004	Estádio da Machava, Maputo, Mozambique	Mozambique	1–0	1–0	2004 COSAFA Cup
7	10 October 2004	Estádio da Cidadela, Luanda, Angola	Zimbabwe	1–0	1–0	2006 FIFA World Cup qualification
8	23 February 2005	Stade Alphonse Massemba-Débat, Brazzaville, Congo	Congo	1–0	2–0	Friendly
9	27 May 2005	Stade Olympique de Radès, Radès, Tunisia	Tunisia	1–3	1–4	Friendly
10	5 June 2005	Estádio da Cidadela, Luanda, Angola	Algeria	1–0	2–1	2006 FIFA World Cup qualification
11	21 January 2006	Cairo Military Academy Stadium, Cairo, Egypt	Cameroon	1–1	1–3	2006 Africa Cup of Nations
12	29 January 2006	Cairo International Stadium, Cairo, Egypt	Togo	1–0	3–2	2006 Africa Cup of Nations
13	29 January 2006	Cairo International Stadium, Cairo, Egypt	Togo	2–1	3–2	2006 Africa Cup of Nations
14	21 June 2006	Zentralstadion, Leipzig, Germany	Iran	1–0	1–1	2006 FIFA World Cup
15	8 October 2006	Estádio da Cidadela, Luanda, Angola	Kenya	1–0	3–1	2008 Africa Cup of Nations qualification
16	8 October 2006	Estádio da Cidadela, Luanda, Angola	Kenya	2–0	3–1	2008 Africa Cup of Nations qualification
17	25 March 2007	Estádio da Cidadela, Luanda, Angola	Eritrea	1–0	6–1	2008 Africa Cup of Nations qualification
18	25 March 2007	Estádio da Cidadela, Luanda, Angola	Eritrea	5–1	6–1	2008 Africa Cup of Nations qualification
19	17 June 2007	Estádio da Cidadela, Luanda, Angola	Swaziland	3–0	3–0	2008 Africa Cup of Nations qualification
20	22 August 2007	Stade des Martyrs, Kinshasa, DR Congo	DR Congo	1–1	1–3	Friendly
21	17 November 2007	Stade de Melun, Melun, France	Ivory Coast	2–0	2–1	Friendly
22	13 January 2008	Complexo Desportivo FC Alverca, Alverca do Ribatejo, Portugal	Egypt	2–2	3–3	Friendly
23	16 January 2008	Prince Moulay Abdellah Stadium, Rabat, Morocco	Morocco	1–0	1–2	Friendly
24	27 January 2008	Tamale Stadium, Tamale, Ghana	Senegal	3–1	3–1	2008 Africa Cup of Nations
25	1 June 2008	Estádio dos Coqueiros, Luanda, Angola	Benin	1–0	3–0	2010 FIFA World Cup qualification
26	8 June 2008	Stade Général-Seyni-Kountché, Niamey, Niger	Niger	1–1	2–1	2010 FIFA World Cup qualification
27	7 September 2008	Stade de l'Amitié, Cotonou, Benin	Benin	1–1	2–3	2010 FIFA World Cup qualification
28	12 August 2009	Estádio do Restelo, Lisbon, Portugal	Togo	1–0	2–0	Friendly
29	14 November 2009	Estádio da Cidadela, Luanda, Angola	Congo	1–0	1–1	Friendly
30	10 January 2010	Estádio 11 de Novembro, Luanda, Angola	Mali	1–0	4–4	2010 Africa Cup of Nations
31	10 January 2010	Estádio 11 de Novembro, Luanda, Angola	Mali	2–0	4–4	2010 Africa Cup of Nations
32	14 January 2010	Estádio 11 de Novembro, Luanda, Angola	Malawi	1–0	2–0	2010 Africa Cup of Nations
33	4 September 2011	Estádio Nacional do Chiazi, Cabinda, Angola	Uganda	2–0	2–0	2012 Africa Cup of Nations qualification
34	14 January 2012	Estádio Nacional do Chiazi, Cabinda, Angola	Sierra Leone	3–1	3–1	Friendly

== Honours ==
Al Ahly

- Egyptian Premier League: 2005–06, 2006–07, 2007–08, 2008–09
- Egypt Cup: 2006, 2007
- Egyptian Super Cup 2005, 2006, 2007, 2008
- CAF Champions League: 2005, 2006, 2008
- CAF Super Cup: 2006, 2007, 2009
- FIFA Club World Cup third place: 2006

Petro Atletico

- Girabola: 2000, 2001
- Taça de Angola: 2000, 2002, 2013
- Angolan SuperCup: 2002

Angola

- Qualified for the 2006 World Cup with Angola for the first time ever, and scored Angola's only World Cup goal in their history so far (despite playing for only thirty-nine minutes during the whole tournament).
- He scored 7 goals so far for Angola in African Cup of Nations so far, in Egypt 2006, Ghana 2008, Angola 2010.

Individual

- CAF Champions League best player: 2001
- Egyptian Premier League top goalscorer: 2006–07, 2008–09
- Girabola top goalscorer: 2001, 2002
- CAF Champions League top goalscorer: 2001
