= Asiagate =

Football match fixing scandal

Asiagate is the name of the match fixing scandal that involved players and officials of the Zimbabwe national football team. Zimbabwe's national team (sometimes composed of local players) underwent tours of Asia and lost several games which led to suspicions of match fixing.

The conspiracy was reportedly established by Singaporean Wilson Raj Perumal who was arrested in Finland for attempting to fix Finnish matches.

In February 2012, ZIFA Chief Executive Jonathan Mashingaidze was kidnapped having been investigating into the match-fixing.

As of March 2012, 98 Zimbabwean players had been suspended due to an ongoing investigation.

The Zimbabwean Warriors' national team coach Norman Mapeza and his assistant Joey Antipas have also been suspended.

Bekhithemba Ndlovu was suspended for 10 years.

== Matches ==
| Malaysia | 2–0 | Zimbabwe (Monomotapa United) |

Malaysia cancelled a friendly with Liberia and invited Zimbabwe as a replacement. Zimbabwe's Football Association sent Monomotapa United F.C to represent the FA. The match was stripped of its "A" status when it was found that it was a club side in national team colours.

| Vietnam | v | Zimbabwe |

21 August 2007

| Singapore | 4–2 | Zimbabwe |

| Oman | v | Zimbabwe |

12 May 2009

| Jordan | 2–0 | Zimbabwe |

| Bulgaria | v | Zimbabwe |

| China | v | Zimbabwe |

28 December 2009

| Thailand | 3–0 | Zimbabwe |

| Yemen | v | Zimbabwe |
