= Maxwell Dube =

Zimbabwean footballer (born 1976)

Personal information
- Date of birth: 30 November 1976 (age 49)
- Position: Forward

Senior career*
Years	Team	Apps	(Gls)
1994–1997	Chapungu United		
1998–1999	Hellenic		
1999–2000	FC Fortune Kuils River		
1999–2003	Chapungu United		
2004	Dynamos Harare		
2006–2009	Chapungu United		

International career
1997–2003	Zimbabwe	30	(1)
- * Club domestic league appearances and goals

Maxwell Dube (born 30 November 1976) is a Zimbabwean former professional footballer who played as a forward.
