= Patrick Mabedi =

Malawian footballer

Personal information
- Date of birth: 5 November 1973 (age 52)
- Place of birth: Blantyre, Malawi
- Height: 1.80 m (5 ft 11 in)
- Position: Defender

Team information
- Current team: Young Africans (caretaker)

Senior career*
Years	Team	Apps	(Gls)
1997–1998	Big Bullets	19	(3)
1998–2006	Kaizer Chiefs	205	(7)
2006–2008	Moroka Swallows	33	(1)

International career
	Malawi	21	(5)

Managerial career
- 2014–2015: Moroka Swallows (assistant)
- 2015–2016: Black Aces (assistant)
- 2016: Malawi (assistant)
- 2016–2017: Cape Town All Stars
- 2017–2018: Kaizer Chiefs (assistant)
- 2018: Kaizer Chiefs (caretaker)
- 2019: Black Leopards (assistant)
- 2020–2023: Malawi U20
- 2023–2025: Malawi
- 2025–: Young Africans (caretaker)
- * Club domestic league appearances and goals

Patrick Mabedi (born 5 November 1973) is a Malawian football coach and a former player who played as defender. He is the caretaker of the Tanzanian Premier League club Young Africans. He also played for the country's national team for a long time. He is nicknamed Bosti or The General.

== Career ==
Under coach Ted Dumitru, Mabedi and Fabian McCarthy formed a solid last line of defence that took the Kaizer Chiefs to its first title in 12 years in breath-taking fashion with six points of second-place Ajax Cape Town with only three defeats the entire season.

== Coaching career ==
Mabedi began his coaching career as the head, youth department, for Moroka Swallows from 2011 till 2015 and was later appointed as their assistant coach during the 2014–15 season under Craig Rosslee. The following season he left Swallows and joined Mpumalanga Black Aces, and spent the season as their assistant coach to Muhsin Ertuğral when they finished fourth in the Absa Premiership, 24 points behind champions Mamelodi Sundowns. In 2016, he had a brief spell as the assistant coach of the Malawian national team before taking up the role of head coach of Cape Town All Stars guiding them to a ninth-place finish in the 2016-17 National First Division season.

In June 2017, Mabedi was appointed assistant manager of Kaizer Chiefs. On 23 April 2018, he was appointed caretaker manager for the rest of the season. In early December, Chiefs relieved him of his duties as the team's assistant coach after the club had also terminated the contract of the club's head coach. In the summer 2019, he was appointed assistant manager of Black Leopards under Lionel Soccoia. The duo was fired on 17 September 2019.

=== Managerial record ===
As of match played 18 November 2024

Managerial record by team and tenure
Team	Nat	From	To	Record					Ref.
Team	Nat	From	To	G	W	D	L	Win %	Ref.
Malawi		2023	present	12	3	1	8	25.00	
Career Total				12	3	1	8	25.00	—

== Career statistics ==
=== International ===
Scores and results list Malawi's goal tally first, score column indicates score after each Mabedi goal.

List of international goals scored by Patrick Mabedi
No.	Date	Venue	Opponent	Score	Result	Competition
1	4 August 1997	Nyayo National Stadium, Nairobi, Kenya	Kenya	2–2	2–2	Friendly
2	6 July 1998	Mzuzu Stadium, Mzuzu, Malawi	Mozambique	?–?	2–1	Friendly
3	8 July 1998	Silver Stadium, Lilongwe, Malawi	Mozambique	?–?	2–2	Friendly
4	18 July 1998	Chichiri Stadium, Blantyre, Malawi	Zimbabwe	1–0	1–0	Friendly
5	28 January 2001	Stade du 28 Septembre, Conakry, Guinea	Guinea	1–1	1–1	2002 FIFA World Cup qualification
6	25 February 2001	Chichiri Stadium, Blantyre, Malawi	South Africa	1–2	1–2	2002 FIFA World Cup qualification
7	21 July 2001	Chichiri Stadium, Blantyre, Malawi	South Africa	1–0	1–0	2001 COSAFA Cup
8	21 September 2002	Chichiri Stadium, Blantyre, Malawi	South Africa	1–0	1–3	2002 COSAFA Cup
9	4 September 2004	Moi International Sports Centre, Nairobi, Kenya	Kenya	2–3	2–3	2006 FIFA World Cup qualification
