= Edzai Kasinauyo =

Zimbabwean footballer (1975-2017)

Edzai Kasinauyo (28 March 1975 – 16 June 2017) was a former Zimbabwean football midfielder.

He has been capped for the Zimbabwean national team. He was in the Zimbabwean squad for the 2006 African Cup of Nations.

== Clubs ==
- 1995–1998: (Zimbabwe) CAPS United FC
- 1998–1999: (South Africa) Cape Town Spurs
- 1999–2001: (South Africa) Ajax Cape Town
- 2001–2002: (South Africa) Hellenic FC
- 2002–2003: (South Africa) Ajax Cape Town
- 2003–2006: (South Africa) Moroka Swallows
- 2006–2007: (South Africa) FC AK
- 2007–2008: (South Africa) Moroka Swallows

On 30 March 2016, Kasinauyo was expelled by ZIFA over match fixing.
