= F.C. Platinum =

Zimbabwean football club

Platinum
- Full name: Football Club Platinum
- Founded: 1995; 31 years ago
- Ground: Mandava Stadium
- Capacity: 15,000
- League: Zimbabwe Premier Soccer League (ZPSL)
- 2025: 6th of 18

Football Club Platinum is a professional football club in Zvishavane, Midlands Province, that competes in the Zimbabwe Premier Soccer League.

Founded in 1995, the club was known as Mimosa Football Club in 2010. In January 2011, it changed its name to FC Platinum.

== Honours ==
- Zimbabwe Premier Soccer League
  - Champions (4): 2017, 2018, 2019, 2021–22
- Chibuku Super Cup
  - Champions (1): 2021

== Performance in CAF competitions ==
- CAF Champions League: 6 appearances

2012 – First round
2018 – Preliminary Round
2019 – Group Stage
2020 – Group Stage
2021 – First Round
2022 - First Round

- CAF Confederation Cup: 2 appearances

2015 – First round

- CAF Super Cup: 0 appearance
