= Ian Gorowa =

Zimbabwean footballer and manager (born 1971)

Personal information
- Full name: Ian Kuziva Gorowa 'Dibango'
- Date of birth: 16 November 1971 (age 54)
- Place of birth: Rusape, Zimbabwe
- Position: Winger

Senior career*
Years	Team	Apps	(Gls)
- Dynamos
- Black Rhinos
- Cape Town Spurs

International career
1995–1998	Zimbabwe	6	(1)

Managerial career
- 2007–2008: Moroka Swallows F.C.
- 2013–2014: Zimbabwe
- * Club domestic league appearances and goals

Ian Kuziva Gorowa Dibango (born 16 November 1971) is a former Zimbabwean footballer, formerly managing South African Premier Soccer League side Moroka Swallows and former assistant manager of Ajax Cape Town and PSL Giants Mamelodi Sundowns where he became Interim Head Coach .

== Playing days ==
Ian 'Dibango' Gorowa came to South Africa after playing for Dynamos and Black Rhinos in his native country. He joined the now defunct Cape Town Spurs where he made a name for himself as an attacking winger.

Unfortunately, his playing days came to an abrupt end at the relatively young age of 29 when he suffered a career-ending injury while playing for Spurs.

He represented the Zimbabwean national team 26 times and scored 11 goals in the process. He played for Zimbabwe at the 1998 COSAFA Cup.

== Coaching career ==
After his retirement he became Spurs' assistant coach. When Spurs merged with Seven Stars to form Ajax Cape Town, Gorowa was roped in by Ajax CEO John Comitis as one of the development coaches.

He then went on to become the team's assistant coach. As assistant to Turk Muhsin Ertugral, the Urban Warriors managed to win the 2007 ABSA Cup—the club's first major trophy since 2000.

He joined The Birds on a three-year contract in June 2007 to replace Gavin Hunt who moved to SuperSport United as replacement for Pitso Mosimane who chose to take up a full-time job as Carlos Alberto Parreira's deputy in the Bafana Bafana dressing room. He later parted ways with the club and worked as an assistant coach at Thanda Royal Zulu. A few years after being the assistant coach of Mamelodi Sundowns then the Interim Head Coach.

On 24 July 2013 he became the manager of Zimbabwe. He resigned on 6 August 2014. In 2016 he was involved in a match fixing scandal with former Ajax Cape Town winger Edzai Kasinauyo. They were later cleared by Zifa of match fixing charges. A few years later Gorowa and his wife, Chipo Gorowa, became pastors at Apostolic Faith Mission.
