= Cup of Zimbabwe =

Zimbabwean football cup

The Cup of Zimbabwe (most recently known as the Chibuku Cup for sponsorship reasons) is the top knockout tournament of the Zimbabwean football. It was created in 1962 as the Cup of Southern Rhodesia and was known between 1965 and 1980 as the Cup of Rhodesia. Due to sponsorship, the competition has undergone a number of name changes: from its creation in 1962 until 1998, the cup was known as the Castle Cup, after its sponsor, the Johannesburg-based Castle Lager. Castle also sponsored the Northern Rhodesian (Zambian from 1964) equivalent of the competition, which led to the creation of the "Super Castle Cup", played between 1962 and 1965 between the winners of the Southern Rhodesia Castle Cup and its Northern Rhodesian (from 1962 to 1964) or Zambian (in 1965) equivalent. After the cessation of Castle sponsorship, the competition was abandoned for two seasons before being brought back in 2001 as the ZIFA Unity Cup. It retained this name until 2006, when it was known as the CBZ Cup. This name was extended to CBZ FA Cup in 2007. The cup was not played in 2009 or 2010.

The competition was rebranded the Mbada Diamonds Cup in 2011, with the 16 teams from the Zimbabwe Premier Soccer League participating, and the winner qualifying for the CAF Confederation Cup.

In 2014, the competition became known as the Chibuku Super Cup.

The winner plays the winners of the Zimbabwe Premier Soccer League in the Castle Challenge Cup at the beginning of the following season.

== Winners ==
=== Mbada Diamonds Cup ===
- 2011: Dynamos 1–0 Motor Action
- 2012: Dynamos 2–0 Monomotapa United
- 2013: Highlanders 3–0 How Mine

=== Chibuku Cup ===
- 2014: Platinum 1–1 (3–1 pen.) Harare City
- 2015: Harare City 2–1 Dynamos
- 2016: Ngezi Platinum 3–1 Platinum
- 2017: Harare City 3–1 How Mine
- 2018: Triangle United 2–0 Harare City
- 2019: Highlanders 1–0 Ngezi Platinum
- 2020: Not played
- 2021: Platinum 0–0 (5–3 pen.) Ngezi Platinum
- 2022: Bulawayo Chiefs 1–0 Herentals
- 2023: Dynamos 2–0 Ngezi Platinum
- 2024: Dynamos 1–1 (aet, 4–2 pen.) Ngezi Platinum
- 2025: Dynamos 1–0 Triangle
