= 2011 Mauritian League =

Mauritian League
- Season: 2011
- Champions: ASPL 2000
- Matches: 78
- Goals: 221 (2.83 per match)
- Biggest home win: ASVP 6–0 CTNFB U-20 (3 April 2011)
- Biggest away win: Etoile de L'Ouest 0–13 CSSC (19 June 2011)
- Highest scoring: Etoile de L'Ouest 0–13 CSSC (19 June 2011)

The 2011 Mauritian League season (also known as Barclays League for sponsorship reasons) was the 67th edition of the Mauritian League football competition since its founding in 1935 in Mauritian. The 2011 fixtures were released in February 2011. 14 teams contested in a season that began on 26 February 2011, and concluded on 26 June 2011.

ASPL 2000 successfully pursued its 2011 title, their 5th title after a hiatus since 2005.

Due to the preparation of the Mauritius national football team for the 2011 edition of the Indian Ocean Games, the season was shortened. From the 14 teams originally competing (Etoile de L'Ouest was later removed from the league, see Controversies), the top eight qualified for a new professional league, named the Super League, to begin play after the conclusion of the Indian Ocean Island Games in 2012. The rest of the teams were placed into the new topflight Premier Division, which would start play simultaneously. Centre Technique National François-Blaquart were not subject to promotion or relegation. The restructuring of the Mauritian league system was done in an attempt to encourage professionalize Mauritian football.

== Rule changes ==
The league introduced a cap on the number of foreign players in a squad. From this season onwards, clubs would have to declare a squad of no more than three players of foreign origin, in an attempt to encourage the growth of Mauritian footballers. The league would only use CD Narsil technologies to record transfers. This is in compliance with mandates issued by FIFA.

To compete in the league, teams had to meet certain conditions. They must have a club house or a room equipped with telephone, fax, and/or internet connection with a full-time administrative secretary. They needed to have a permanent training ground, preferably equipped with projectors. The team must have at least 12 players signed to a professional contract, and each team must have a U-20 youth team. The MFA also required that teams hire a qualified coach, holding at least a C license, a doctor and a physio.

The allocation fees for each team also increased. 1,000,000 rupees were allocated to each team.

== Teams ==
All of the Mauritian League teams submitted their squad list on the 31 January 2011 deadline.

A total of fourteen teams competed in the 2011 league season, including twelve sides from the 2010 Mauritian League and two promoted teams from the 2010 National Second Division. Late into the season, Etoile de L'Ouest was removed from the league (see Controversies).

U.S. Bassin-Beau/Rose Hill were relegated to their regional league. Cercle de Joachim and U.S. Highlands were promoted to the Mauritian league.

=== Stadia and locations ===
Locations of the 2011 Mauritian League teams

Team	Location	Stadium	Stadium capacity
AS Port-Louis 2000	Port Louis	Stade St. François Xavier	2,000
AS Rivière du Rempart	Mapou	Stade Anjalay	30,000
AS de Vacoas-Phoenix	Vacoas-Phoenix	Stade George V	6,200
Centre Technique National François-Blaquart	Trianon	MFA Headquarters	
Cercle de Joachim SC	Curepipe	Stade George V	6,200
Curepipe Starlight SC	Curepipe	Stade George V	6,200
Entente Boulet Rouge	Centre de Flacq	Stade Auguste Vollaire	4,000
Etoile de L'Ouest SC	Bambous	Stade Germain Comarmond	5,000
Faucon Flacq SC	Centre de Flacq	Stade Auguste Vollaire	4,000
Pamplemousses SC	Belle Vue Maurel	Stade Anjalay	30,000
Petite Rivière Noire SC	Petite Rivière Noire	Stade Germain Comarmond	5,000
Pointe-aux-Sables Mates	Pointe-aux-Sables	Stade Sir Gaëtan Duval	6,500
Savanne SC	Souillac	Stade Harry Latour	2,000
US Highlands	Highlands	Stade Quartier Militaire	4,000

=== Personnel ===
Note: Flags indicate national team as has been defined under FIFA eligibility rules. Players and Managers may hold more than one non-FIFA nationality.

Team	Manager	Captain
AS Port-Louis 2000	(Madagascar) Fidy Rasoanaivo	(Mauritius) Jiovanni Jubeau
AS Rivière du Rempart	(Mauritius) Tony François	(Mauritius) Tony François
AS de Vacoas-Phoenix	(Madagascar) Maurice Andriamandranto	(Mauritius) Jean-Pierre Cerveaux
Centre Technique National François-Blaquart	(Mauritius) Rajen Dorasami	(Mauritius) Stéphan Nabab
Cercle de Joachim SC	(Mauritius) Jean-Marc Chaton (Mauritius) Deoduth Beekhun	(Mauritius) Jean-Yves André
Curepipe Starlight SC	(Mauritius) Sarjoo Gowreesunkur	(Mauritius) Johan Candassamy
Entente Boulet Rouge	(Mauritius) Gaëtan Poché	(Mauritius) Stéphane Apollon
Etoile de L'Ouest SC	(Mauritius) Dominique Fortuné (Mauritius) Patrick Édouard	(Mauritius) Pascal Dig-Dig
Faucon Flacq SC	(Mauritius) Jean Jasmin Walter	(Madagascar) Medar Ndriananampy
Pamplemousses SC	(Mauritius) Henri Speville	(Mauritius) Colin Bell
Petite Rivière Noire SC	(Mauritius) Taleb Fatehmamode	(Mauritius) Stéphane Pierre
Pointe-aux-Sables Mates	(Madagascar) Bruno Randrianarivony	(Mauritius) Rico Shocktorap
Savanne SC	(Mauritius) Prakash Parmanund	(Mauritius) Kurty Dessalles
US Highlands	(Mauritius) Daniel Ramsamy	(Mauritius) Sawan Kumar Sreeneebus

=== Managerial changes ===
Team	Outgoing manager	Manner of departure	Date of vacancy	Table	Incoming manager	Date of appointment
Curepipe Starlight	(Mauritius) Rajesh Gunesh	Resigned	19 January 2011	Pre-season	(Mauritius) Sarjoo Gowreesunkur	19 January 2011
Etoile de L'Ouest	(Mauritius) Curtis Calambé	Resigned	29 January 2011	Pre-season	(Mauritius) Dominique Fortuné (Mauritius) Patrick Édouard	29 January 2011
Cercle de Joachim	(Mauritius) Sydney Caëtane	Resigned	14 April 2011	7th	(Mauritius) Jean-Marc Chaton (Mauritius) Deoduth Beekhun	14 April 2011

== League table ==
- 1st to 8th qualify for the new Super League, beginning play in 2012
- 9th to 14th would compete in the new National 1st Division, beginning play in 2012 as well
- Centre Technique National François-Blaquart were not subject to promotion/relegation
- Results for all teams against Etoile de L'Ouest were nullified after the latter was removed from the league by the MFA (see Controversies)

Pos	Team	Pld	W	D	L	GF	GA	GD	Pts	Qualification
1	Port-Louis 2000	12	10	0	2	29	8	+21	30	2012 Mauritian Premier League
2	Vacoas-Phoenix	12	9	2	1	29	5	+24	29	2012 Mauritian Premier League
3	Savanne	12	7	1	4	23	17	+6	22	2012 Mauritian Premier League
4	Pamplemousses	12	6	3	3	22	15	+7	21	2012 Mauritian Premier League
5	Pointe-aux-Sables Mates	12	6	1	5	23	20	+3	19	2012 Mauritian Premier League
6	Cercle de Joachim	12	5	3	4	13	15	−2	18	2012 Mauritian Premier League
7	Rivière du Rempart	12	5	1	6	11	11	0	16	2012 Mauritian Premier League
8	Petite Rivière Noire	12	4	3	5	16	16	0	15	2012 Mauritian Premier League
9	Curepipe Starlight	12	3	4	5	11	15	−4	13	2012 National 1st Division
10	Entente Boulet Rouge	12	2	4	6	12	23	−11	10	2012 National 1st Division
11	CTNFB U-20	12	1	6	5	14	27	−13	9	2012 National 1st Division
12	Highlands	12	2	3	7	8	22	−14	9	2012 National 1st Division
13	Faucon Flacq	12	1	3	8	10	27	−17	6	2012 National 1st Division

Updated to match(es) played on 27 June 2011. Source: Mauritian League, Soccerway
Rules for classification: 1) points; 2) goal difference; 3) number of goals scored.

== Results ==
Before Etoile de L'Ouest were removed from the league, each team were to play 13 games, for a total of 91 games. After Etoile de L'Ouest was removed, each team ended up playing a total of 12 games for a total of 78 games. All results involving Etoile de L'Ouest were nullified in relation to final standings.

Home \ Away	PL	RR	VP	CTN	CJ	CS	EBR	FF	PAM	PRN	PAS	SAV	HIG
Port-Louis 2000					2–1		3–0	5–0			2–1		3–0
Rivière du Rempart	0–1 (Replay)				0–1	0–1				1–2	3–2	0–2	3–0
Vacoas-Phoenix	1–0	2–0		6–0	0–1			2–0			4–2		3–0
CTNFB U-20	1–3	0–0				1–1	1–1	2–2		4–3	1–4	1–3	2–2
Cercle de Joachim				1–0		1–1			1–2	0–4	1–2	2–1	
Curepipe Starlight	0–2		0–3				0–0				2–1	2–3	1–2
Entente Boulet Rouge		0–2	1–6		1–1				3–2		1–2		1–2
Faucon Flacq		0–1			2–2	0–2	0–1				2–5		2–1
Pamplemousses	2–1	0–1	1–1	1–1		1–1		2–0		2–1	4–0	1–5	4–0
Petite Rivière Noire	0–3 (AWD)		0–1			1–0	1–1	1–1			0–2	2–0	1–1
Pointe-aux-Sables Mates													
Savanne	2–4		0–0				3–2	3–1			0–2		1–0
Highlands					0–1						0–0		

Updated to match(es) played on 27 June 2011. Source: FIFA Mauritius, Mauritian League
Legend: Blue = home team win; Yellow = draw; Red = away team win.

== Controversies ==
On 5 March 2011, after a game that ASPL 2000 beat AS Rivière du Rempart 2–0, ASRR accused ASPL 2000 of fielding an ineligible player, Jonathan Ernest, due to yellow card accumulation. The MFA looked into the matter, and ruled in favor of ASRR, suspending Ernest for two weeks and forcing the game to be replayed in May. ASPL 2000 won that game as well 1–0.

On 8 June 2011, after a game that Petite Rivière Noire SC beat ASPL 2000 2–1, ASPL 2000 accused Petite Rivière Noire of fielding an ineligible player, Stéphane Badul, due to yellow card accumulation. Ironically, ASPL 2000 had been accused of the same thing two months prior. The MFA once again looked into the case, and once again ruled in favor of the accuser. This time, however, the punishment was much harsher, as they suspended Badul for six months (putting his chances of representing Mauritius in the 2011 IOG in the air) and fining Petite Rivière Noire 3000 rupees. ASPL 2000 was also awarded the game 3–0. Petite Rivière Noire expressed outrage at how harsh was the penalty, as compared to the Ernest incident. After this case, the MFA agreed to review the Ernest case, which was very similar but much more lenient on the accused.

On 22 June 2011, after a meeting was held by the National Managing Committee of the MFA, it was determined that Etoile de L'Ouest SC was unfit to compete in the Mauritian League after losing by wide margins in the previous few games and being very unprofessional, which included fielding only 8 players in a game. With immediate effect, the team was removed from the league and all games that the team played were nullified.

== Republic Cup ==
On 13 March 2011, the Republic Cup was played between Pamplemousses SC and Petite Rivière Noire SC.

13 March 2011
15:30 UTC+4

Pamplemousses SC	3–1	Petite Rivière Noire SC
Fricain 24' (o.g.); Ratovonirina 30', 39'; Chavry (yellow card) 62'	(Report)	13' Calambé; (yellow card) 14' (yellow-red card) 73' Pierre; (yellow card) 73' Badul

Stade Anjalay, Belle Vue Maurel
Attendance: 1,000
Referee: Parmendra Nunkoo (Mauritius)
