= List of football stadiums in Mauritius =

The following is a list of football stadiums in Mauritius, ordered by capacity. Stadiums with a capacity of 1,000 or higher are included.

== Current stadiums ==
#	Image	Stadium	Capacity	City	Home team(s)
1		Stade Anjalay	16,000	Belle Vue Maurel	Mauritius national football team, Pamplemousses SC, AS Rivière du Rempart, Arsenal Wanderers
2		Sir Gaëtan Duval Stadium	6,500	Beau Bassin-Rose Hill	US Beau Bassin-Rose Hill
3		Stade George V	6,200	Curepipe	Mauritius national football team, Curepipe Starlight SC, AS de Vacoas-Phoenix, Cercle de Joachim SC
4		Germain Comarmond Stadium	5,000	Bambous	Mauritius U-17, Mauritius U-20, Petite Rivière Noire SC, Bambous Etoile de L'Ouest SC
5		Stade de Cote d'Or	5,000	Saint Pierre	Mauritius national football team, FC Liverpool Academy
6		Stade Auguste Vollaire	4,000	Central Flacq	Faucon Flacq SC
7		Quartier Militaire stadium	3,000	Quartier Militaire	
8		St. François Xavier Stadium	2,500	Port Louis	AS Port-Louis 2000
9		Sir Winston Churchill Stadium (Vélodrome)	2,000	Curepipe	
10		Stade Harry Latour	2,000	Mahébourg	Savanne SC
11		Stade Sir Guy Rozemont	1,000	Quatre Bornes	

== See also ==
- List of African stadiums by capacity
- Lists of stadiums
