= List of football clubs in Mauritius =

The following is an incomplete list of association football clubs based in Mauritius. For a complete list see Category:Football clubs in Mauritius

== A ==
- Arsenal Wanderers
- AS de Vacoas-Phoenix
- AS Port-Louis 2000
- AS Rivière du Rempart
- AS Quatre Bornes

== B ==
- Bambous Etoile de L'ouest SC
- Bolton City Youth Club
- Bambous Western Cadets National Youth Club
- Bois Mangue Rovers SC

== C ==
- Cercle de Joachim SC
- Chamarel FC
- Curepipe Starlight SC
- Hindu Cadet Club

== E ==
- Entente Boulet Rouge SC

== F ==
- Faucon Flacq SC
- Fire Brigade SC

== G ==
- GRSE Wanderers

== M ==
- Morcellement St Andre Young Lions SC
- MSA Shining SC (Defunct)

== P ==
- Pamplemousses SC
- Petite Rivière Noire FC
- Pointe-aux-Sables Mates
- Plaines des Papayes White Sparrow SC

== S ==
- Savanne SC

== U ==
- Union Sportive de Beau-Bassin Rose-Hill
