= Football in Mauritius =

- Governing body: Mauritius Football Association
- National team: national football team

Club competitions
- Mauritian Super League

International competitions
- Champions League; CAF Confederation Cup; Super Cup; FIFA Club World Cup; FIFA World Cup (National Team); African Cup of Nations (National Team)

Football is the most popular sport in Mauritius. The national governing body is the Mauritius Football Association. Internationally, Mauritius is represented by Club M in senior competitions, and by the U-17 and U-20 teams in youth competitions. The top domestic football league in Mauritius is the Mauritian League, and the top knockout tournament is the Mauritian Cup.

== History ==
Football in Mauritius has had a tumultuous history. The Mauritian League was founded in 1935, and the Mauritius Football Association (MFA) was founded in 1952, affiliated to FIFA in 1962 and to the Confederation of African Football (CAF) in 1963. The founding members of the association were FC Dodo, Faucon Flacq SC (now renamed Flacq SC), CSC, Hounds, Royal College of Curepipe, and Saint Joseph College, all of which were based out of Curepipe and, with the exception of Flacq SC, have since ceased to exist. Troubles have arisen for the MFA, ranging from perpetual financial shortages to constant change of presidents. It has also been under fire from various quarters for failing to stem the decline of football in Mauritius. Although football continues to be the most popular sport in the country, the majority of domestic league matches attract very few spectators (sometimes less than a handful), earning the clubs and the MFA very little income and leaving the players without the motivation to showcase their skills.

The focus of the sport's popularity has almost completely shifted to the English Premier League, which is considered far more exciting due to the high quality of football on display and the presence of numerous world-famous stars. National and International television networks beam Premier League matches into the living rooms multiple times every week, adding to the erosion of interest in local football.

There are a lot of Liverpool and Manchester United fans in Mauritius.

The 1999 major restructuring of the MPL was regarded as the beginning of the decline in Mauritian football. Due to a riot on May 23, 1999, between Fire Brigade Sports Club (now renamed as Pamplemousses SC) and Scouts Club (renamed as Port Louis Sporting Club), which lasted for three days and killed seven people, the government imposed an 18-month ban on all footballing activities in the country, with only the national team permitted to play during this period. The restructure, which was an effort to de-ethnicize local clubs, required the "regionalization" of clubs, with teams now being formed on the basis of region instead of ethnicity or religion. Although the move achieved the desired results in terms of reduction in violent conflicts, it also removed the traditional rivalry among fans, resulting in loss of interest and support. In fact, many locals believe that the resurrection of Mauritian football lies in permitting the formation of clubs on the basis of ethnicity or religion.

On the international stage, the national team, known as Club M, has won the Indian Ocean Games twice and qualifying for the Africa Cup of Nations once in 1974. It has fallen in the FIFA World Rankings in the past few years to the lowest it has ever been. in 2006 four Regional Technical Centers (CTRs) were created to improve youth football in Mauritius, to support the national team.

== Mauritius national football team ==
The Mauritius national football team is the national football team of Mauritius. Club M won the Indian Ocean Island Games in 2003.

== Mauritian League ==
The Mauritian League, otherwise known as the Barclays League, is the top league of Mauritian football. The MFA Second Division is the second highest level of Mauritian football.

=== Mauritian Cup ===
The Mauritian Cup is the top knockout tournament of Mauritian football.

== League system ==
Level	League(s)/division(s)
1	Premier League; 10 clubs
2	First Division; 9 clubs + CTNFB
3	Second Division; 9 clubs + CTNFB
4	Regional League (Premier League) (twelve parallel regional "FAS" League)
5	Regional League (Division One) (twelve parallel regional "FAS" League)
6	Regional League (Division Two) (some regional "FAS" League)
7	Regional League (Division Three) (some regional "FAS" League)

=== Regional League ===
Beau Bassin Rose Hill	Black River	Curepipe	Flacq	Grand Port	Port Louis	Moka	Quatre Bornes	Rivière du Rempart	Rodrigues Island	Savanne	Vacoas-Phoenix

== Notable Mauritian footballers ==
=== Born in Mauritius ===
Name	Position	Current club	National team
Kersley Appou	FW	Retired	Mauritius
Gurty Calambé	FW	(Mauritius) Petite Rivière Noire SC	Mauritius
Brian Casquet	FW	(Germany) TUS Zeppelinheim E.V.	None
Orwin Castel	GK	(Australia) Langwarrin SC	Mauritius
Ned Charles	FW	Retired	Mauritius
Jimmy Cundasamy	MF	(Réunion) US Stade Tamponnaise	Mauritius
Chris Driver	MF	(Australia) Endeavour Hills Fire SC	Mauritius
Mohammad Anwar Elahee	DF	Deceased	Mauritius
Cédric Florent	MF	(Australia) Oakleigh Cannons FC	None
Caleb Francis	MF	Retired	None
Sewram Gobin	FW	(Mauritius) AS Rivière du Rempart	Mauritius
Kervin Godon	MF	(Réunion) Saint-Denis FC	Mauritius
Jean-Marc Ithier	FW	Retired	Mauritius
Jonathan Justin	FW	(France) Balma SC	Mauritius
Jerry Louis	MF	Retired	Mauritius
Jean-Paul de Marigny	DF	Retired, (Australia) Melbourne Victory FC (Assistant coach)	Australia
Jacques-Désiré Périatambée	MF	Retired	Mauritius
Christopher Perle	FW	Retired	Mauritius
Fabrice Pithia	MF	(Mauritius) Curepipe Starlight SC	Mauritius
Herbert Rawson	FW	Deceased	England
Andy Sophie	FW	(Réunion) AS Marsouins	Mauritius

=== Of Mauritian heritage ===
Name	Country of birth	Position	Club	Nationality
Jean-Sebastien Bax	France	MF	Retired	Mauritius
Thierry Boi	Australia	MF	(Australia) Waverley Wanderers SC	Mauritius
Jonathan Bru	France	MF	(Portugal) U.D. Oliveirense	Mauritius
Kévin Bru	France	MF	(England) Ipswich Town F.C.	Mauritius
Dylan Collignon	France	GK	(Belgium) Seraing United	Mauritius
Vikash Dhorasoo	France	MF	Retired	France
Tyrese Francois	Australia	MF	(England) Fulham Academy	None
Gavin Heeroo	England	MF	Retired	Mauritius
Kabir Jeetoo	England	MF	Free Agent	Mauritius
Yoann Khodabuccus	France	DF	Retired	Mauritius
Patrick Kisnorbo	Australia	DF	(Australia) Melbourne City FC	Australia
Jean-Christophe Lourde	France	DF	(Réunion) US Sainte-Marienne	Mauritius
Sébastien Monier	France	MF	Free Agent	None
Kalam Mooniaruck	England	FW	Retired	Mauritius
Arassen Ragaven	France	MF	Free Agent	Mauritius
Lindsay Rose	France	DF	(Greece) Aris Thessaloniki	Mauritius
Wesley Saïd	France	FW	(France) Stade Lavallois (on loan from Stade Rennais F.C.)	None
Kevin Sanasy	England	FW	(England) Saltaire Rangers FC	None
Nikolai Topor-Stanley	Australia	MF	(Australia) Western Sydney Wanderers	Australia
