= 2015–16 Mauritian Premier League =

Mauritian Premier League
- Season: 2015–16
- Champions: Port-Louis
- Relegated: Chamarel and Curepipe Starlight
- Champions League: Port-Louis
- Confederation Cup: Pamplemousses
- Matches played: 180
- Goals scored: 504 (2.8 per match)
- Top goalscorer: Brandly Ratovorinina (25 goals)
- Biggest home win: Pamplemousses 9-0 GRSE Wanderers
- Biggest away win: Petite Rivière Noire 0-5 La Cure Sylvester
- Highest scoring: ASPL 2000 9-2 Rivière du Rempart

The 2015–16 Mauritian Premier League season was the 36th edition of topflight Mauritian Premier League football competition in Mauritius. 10 sides contested in a season that began on 24 October 2015 and finished on 10 July 2016.

Cercle de Joachim unsuccessfully defended its 2nd consecutive 2015 title. Port-Louis successfully pursued its title in the final.

== Teams ==
The 2015–16 Mauritian Premier League campaign consisted of ten sides.

Location of the 2015–16 Mauritian Premier League teams.

Team	Stadium	Capacity
AS Port-Louis	St. François Xavier Stadium	5,000
AS Quatre Bornes	Stade Sir Guy Rozemont	1,000
AS Rivière du Rempart	Stade Anjalay	18,000
Cercle de Joachim	Stade George V	6,200
Chamarel	Stade Germain Comarmond	5,000
Curepipe Starlight	Stade George V	6,200
GRSE Wanderers		
La Cure Sylvester	St. François Xavier Stadium	5,000
Pamplemousses	Stade Anjalay	18,000
Petite Rivière Noire	Stade Germain Comarmond	5,000

== League table ==
Pos	Team	Pld	W	D	L	GF	GA	GD	Pts	Qualification or relegation
1	AS Port-Louis (C, Q)	36	24	8	4	75	23	+52	80	2017 CAF Champions League
2	Pamplemousses (Q)	36	19	9	8	72	42	+30	66	2017 CAF Confederation Cup
3	La Cure Sylvester	36	18	10	8	67	37	+30	64	
4	Quatre Bornes	36	17	11	8	44	33	+11	62	
5	Cercle de Joachim	36	13	12	11	42	35	+7	51	
6	Petite Rivière Noire	36	11	10	15	47	62	−15	43	
7	Rivière du Rempart	36	11	8	17	53	73	−20	41	
8	GRSE Wanderers	36	8	8	20	31	67	−36	32	
9	Chamarel FC (R)	36	7	8	21	34	68	−34	29	Relegation to the National Second Division
10	Curepipe Starlight (R)	36	7	6	23	39	64	−25	27	Relegation to the National Second Division

Updated to match(es) played on 10 July 2016. Source: MPFL - Mauritius Professional Football League
Rules for classification: 1) points; 2) goal difference; 3) number of goals scored.
(C) Champions; (Q) Qualified for the phase indicated; (R) Relegated
