= Mauritian Republic Cup =

The Mauritian Republic Cup is an annual Mauritian football competition created by the Mauritius Football Association in 1990. It usually takes place in the summer of each year. Along with the MFA Cup, it serves as a major cup competition for teams in the top flight of Mauritian football, the Mauritian League.

== Winners ==
- 1990 : Sunrise 2-1 Fire Brigade SC
- 1991 : Fire Brigade SC 4-0 Young Tigers
- 1992 : Sunrise 4-1 RBBS
- 1993 : Sunrise 3-2 Fire Brigade SC
- 1994 : Sunrise 1-0 Maurice Espoir
- 1995 : Fire Brigade SC 3-1 Maurice Espoir
- 1996 : Sunrise 4-0 Scouts Club
- 1997 : Sunrise 0-0 (5 - 2 pen) Fire Brigade SC
- 1998 : Sunrise 4-3 Fire Brigade SC
- 1999 : Fire Brigade SC SC 4-0 Faucon Noir
- 2000 : No competition
- 2001 : AS Port-Louis 2000 2-1 Olympique de Moka
- 2002 : Union Sportive de Beau-Bassin Rose-Hill 5-1 AS de Vacoas-Phoenix
- 2003 : Faucon Flacq 2-1 Union Sportive de Beau-Bassin Rose-Hill
- 2004 : AS Port-Louis 2000 2-1 Union Sportive de Beau-Bassin Rose-Hill
- 2005 : AS Port-Louis 2000 2-0 Union Sportive de Beau-Bassin Rose-Hill
- 2006 : AS de Vacoas-Phoenix 2-2 (5 - 4 pen) PAS Mates
- 2007 : Curepipe Starlight SC 1-0 Savanne SC
- 2008 : Curepipe Starlight SC 2-0 AS Port-Louis 2000
- 2009 : Savanne SC 2-0 Curepipe Starlight SC
- 2010 : Pamplemousses SC 0-0 (6 - 5 pen) Petite Rivière Noire SC
- 2011 : Pamplemousses SC 3-1 Petite Rivière Noire SC
- 2011/12 : Savanne SC 1-1 (aet, 11-10 pen) AS Rivière du Rempart
- 2012/13 : Pamplemousses SC 1-0 Curepipe Starlight SC
- 2013/14 : AS Port-Louis 2000 1-0 Curepipe Starlight SC
- 2014/15 : La Cure Sylvester 1-1 (aet, 5-4 pen) Pamplemousses SC
- 2015/16 : Cercle de Joachim 1-0 AS Port-Louis 2000
- 2016/17 : Pamplemousses SC 4-2 GRSE Wanderers
- 2017/18 : Bolton City Youth Club 2-1 Petite Rivière Noire FC
- 2019 : Pamplemousses SC 1-0 La Cure Sylvester
- 2020 : Pamplemousses SC 4-2 Petite Rivière Noire SC
- 2021 : Abandoned
- 2022/23 : Pamplemousses SC 1-0 Entente Boulet Rouge
- 2024 : Cercle de Joachim 1-0 AS Rivière du Rempart
- 2025 : La Cure Waves 3–0 (a.e.t.) Chebel Citizens
