= 2018–19 Mauritian Premier League =

Mauritian Premier League
- Season: 2018–19
- Champions: Pamplemousses SC
- Relegated: AS Quatre Bornes; AS Rivière du Rempart
- Champions League: Pamplemousses SC
- Confederation Cup: Roche-Bois Bolton City

The 2018–19 Mauritian Premier League is the 39th season of the Mauritian Premier League, the top flight for football league in Mauritius. The league would be contested by the top eight teams from the 2017–18 season as well as the two clubs promoted from the National First Division, Vacoas-Phoenix and Rivière du Rempart. They replaced the two teams that were relegated to the National First Division, Entente Boulet Rouge-Riche Mare Rovers and Chebel Citizens SC

The season began on 23 November 2018 and concluded on 27 April 2019. Pamplemousses SC won the league championship and qualified for the 2019-20 CAF Champions League qualifying round. Roche-Bois Bolton City qualified for the 2019-20 CAF Confederation Cup through winning the 2019 Mauritius Cup. AS Rivière du Rempart and AS Quatre-Bornes were relegated to the National First Division.

== League table ==
Pos	Team	Pld	W	D	L	GF	GA	GD	Pts	Qualification or relegation
1	Pamplemousses SC (C)	18	11	6	1	41	11	+30	39	Qualification for Champions League
2	Roche-Bois Bolton City (Q)	18	10	6	2	33	11	+22	36	Qualification for Confederation Cup (Note: Roche-Bois Bolton City are Mauritius Cup winners.)
3	AS de Vacoas-Phoenix	18	7	7	4	24	19	+5	28	
4	AS Port-Louis 2000	18	6	7	5	21	19	+2	25	
5	Petite Rivière Noire FC	18	6	6	6	29	29	0	24	
6	Savanne SC	18	6	6	6	26	23	+3	24	
7	La Cure Sylvester SC	18	6	4	8	30	33	−3	22	
8	Cercle de Joachim SC	18	5	5	8	19	20	−1	20	
9	AS Rivière du Rempart (R)	18	5	2	11	20	45	−25	17	Relegation to National First Division
10	AS Quatre Bornes (R)	18	1	5	12	7	40	−33	8	Relegation to National First Division

Source: Soccerway
(C) Champions; (Q) Qualified for the phase indicated; (R) Relegated
