= 2010 Mauritian League =

Mauritian League
- Season: 2009–10
- Champions: Pamplemousses SC
- Relegated: US Beau-Bassin/Rose Hill
- Matches played: 138
- Biggest home win: PAS Mates 6-0 Étoile de l'Ouest (25 June 2010); Pamplemousses SC 6-0 USBBRH (14 July 2010); Petite Rivière Noire SC 7-1 PAS Mates (14 November 2010)
- Biggest away win: USBBRH 0-7 Petite Rivière Noire SC (30 October 2010)
- Highest scoring: Petite Rivière Noire SC 7-1 PAS Mates (14 November 2010) (8 goals)

The 2010 Mauritian League season saw Pamplemousses SC become champions for the second time in their history and US Beau-Bassin/Rose Hill were relegated that season.

== League table ==
Pos	Team	Pld	W	D	L	GF	GA	GD	Pts
1	Pamplemousses (C)	23	16	4	3	48	16	+32	52
2	Port-Louis 2000	23	12	7	4	40	20	+20	43
3	Petite Rivière Noire SC	23	11	7	5	52	27	+25	40
4	Vacoas-Phoenix	23	11	7	5	48	24	+24	40
5	Curepipe Starlight	23	11	6	6	31	24	+7	39
6	Savanne	23	10	5	8	29	32	−3	35
7	CTNFB -19	23	9	5	9	38	37	+1	32
8	Pointe-aux-Sables Mates	23	8	8	7	39	39	0	32
9	Entente Boulet Rouge-Riche Mare Rovers	23	5	9	9	21	39	−18	24
10	Rivière du Rempart	24	5	7	12	30	40	−10	22
11	Faucon Flacq	23	5	6	12	22	34	−12	21
12	Bambous Etoile de l'Ouest	23	4	5	14	34	54	−20	17
13	US Beau-Bassin/Rose Hill (R)	23	2	6	15	15	61	−46	12

Source: http://rsssf.com/tablesm/mauri2010.html
Rules for classification: 1) points; 2) goal difference; 3) number of goals scored.
(C) Champions; (R) Relegated
