= 2010 Mauritian Republic Cup =

2010 Republic Cup
Tournament details
- Country: Mauritius

Final positions
- Champions: Pamplemousses SC
- Runners-up: Petite Rivière Noire SC

The 2010 Republic Cup commenced on 6 March 2010 with the first round and concluded on 18 July 2010 with the final, held at the Anjalay Stadium. The final was contested by Pamplemousses SC and Petite Rivière Noire SC. The match was still goalless after extra-time. Pamplemousses SC won the final in the penalty shootout 6–5.

== Round 1 ==
6 March 2010

Petite Rivière Noire SC	2–1	Entente Boulet Rouge

6 March 2010

USBBRH	0–1	AS Rivière du Rempart

6 March 2010

Faucon Flacq SC	1–5	AS de Vacoas-Phoenix

14 March 2010

Étoile de l'Ouest	0–4	Pamplemousses SC

== Quarter-finals ==
14 March 2010

PAS Mates	2–3	AS Rivière du Rempart

14 March 2010

AS de Vacoas-Phoenix	1–0	Savanne SC

14 March 2010

AS Port-Louis 2000	0–1	Petite Rivière Noire SC

10 April 2010

Pamplemousses SC	5–1	Curepipe Starlight SC

== Semi-finals ==
10 April 2010

AS de Vacoas-Phoenix	0–1	Petite Rivière Noire SC

18 April 2010

AS Rivière du Rempart	1–2 (a.e.t.)	Pamplemousses SC

== Final ==
18 July 2010

Pamplemousses SC	0–0 (a.e.t.)	Petite Rivière Noire SC
Penalties
	6–5

Anjalay Stadium, Belle Vue
