= 2017–18 Mauritian Premier League =

Mauritian Premier League
- Season: 2017–18
- Champions: Pamplemousses SC

The 2017–18 Mauritian Premier League season was the 38th season of top-flight football in Mauritius. The season started on 26 November 2017 and finished on 20 May 2018.

== Final standings ==
Pos	Team	Pld	W	D	L	GF	GA	GD	Pts
1	Pamplemousses SC (Q)	27	16	6	5	56	30	+26	54
2	Roche-Bois Bolton City	27	15	9	3	42	20	+22	54
3	AS Port-Louis 2000	27	15	8	4	51	28	+23	53
4	AS Quatre-Bornes	27	12	6	9	31	33	−2	42
5	Petite Rivière Noire FC	27	10	8	9	50	42	+8	38
6	Cercle de Joachim	27	11	5	11	49	40	+9	38
7	La Cure Sylvester SC	27	7	8	12	34	42	−8	29
8	Savanne SC	27	8	5	14	39	60	−21	29
9	Entente Boulet Rouge-Riche Mare Rovers (R)	27	8	2	17	45	67	−22	26
10	Chebel Citizens SC (R)	27	1	7	19	20	55	−35	10

Updated to match(es) played on unknown. Source:
(Q) Qualified for the phase indicated; (R) Relegated

== See also ==
- 2018 Mauritian Cup
