= Ambroise Begue =

French professional footballer (born 1995)

Personal information
- Full name: Ambroise Begue
- Date of birth: 22 May 1995 (age 31)
- Place of birth: Saint-Denis, Réunion, France
- Positions: Defender; midfielder

Team information
- Current team: SC Chaudron
- Number: 17

Youth career
- 2002–2005: J.S. Bois de Nefles
- 2005–2010: Club Sportif Saint-Denis
- 2010–2015: AS Nancy-Lorraine

Senior career*
Years	Team	Apps	(Gls)
2015–2017	Home United	31	(5)
2017–2018	ASPL 2000		
2019–2020	Saint-Denis	36	(1)
2021	Trois Bassins	12	(0)
2022	Parfin	6	(0)
2023–	Chaudron	10	(0)

International career^{‡}
2010–2011	France U16	12	(2)
- * Club domestic league appearances and goals as of 25 April 2025 ‡ National team caps and goals as of 10:12, 26 September 2015 (UTC)

Ambroise Begue (born 22 May 1995) is a French professional footballer who plays as a defender or midfielder for SC Chaudron of the Réunion Premier League. He started his professional youth career with Ligue 2 side AS Nancy-Lorraine, before moving to join Home United for two seasons in the Singapore Premier League. Begue has also represented France at the U16 level.

== Early life ==
In March 2002, Begue joined J.S. Bois de Nèfles, an amateur football club based in Saint Clotilde, Réunion. He stayed with the amateur side for 3 years, before transferring to join Club Sportif Saint-Denis, a professional football club which plays in the Réunion Premier League.

== Club career ==
=== AS Nancy-Lorraine ===
After building his footballing career for 5 years at Club Sportif Saint-Denis, Begue moved to join AS Nancy-Lorraine in July 2010, a club that played in Ligue 2, the second tier of French professional football. Begue featured for the club's reserve team that plays in the Championnat de France Amateur, but never managed to make his senior debut with the club.

=== Home United ===
In 2015, Begue left France for Singapore, and signed a contract with Singaporean club Home United. On 8 May 2015, Begue made his league debut for Home United, in a S.League tie against Geylang United, which ended in a 1–0 loss. On 14 May 2015, Begue scored his first goal at the professional level and for Home United in a match against Hougang United, contributing to an eventual 4–0 win. On 15 August 2015, Begue scored for Home United against S.League giants, Warriors FC in the second leg of the Singapore Cup quarter finals. The final aggregate score recorded 4–1 in a Home United victory after both legs.

For the 2016 S.League season, Begue was moved from Home United's first team squad to the reserve team playing in the Prime League to adhere to new S.League regulations restricting the quota of foreign players in the first team to a maximum of 3. Begue's shirt number was also switched to 27 from the number 18 shirt he wore for the previous season. In the first match of the season, Begue scored Home United's first goal of the season in the opener against DPMM FC in the 19th minute. The match ended in a 2–1 loss for Home United.

=== AS Port-Louis 2000 ===
Following his release by Home United at the conclusion of the 2016 S.League season, Begue joined AS Port-Louis 2000 in 2017, a club which currently plays in the top football division of Mauritius, the Mauritian Premier League.

=== Return to Réunion ===
Since 2019, Begue has been playing for clubs in his native Réunion, namely Saint-Denis, Trois Bassins, Parfin de Saint-André and SC Chaudron.

== International career ==
Prior to joining Home United in Singapore, Begue featured regularly for the France U16 national team.

== Career statistics ==
As of 17 April 2016

Club	League	Season	League		Domestic Cup (Note: Refers to the Singapore League Cup, MFA Cup and Republic Cup competitions.)		Regional Cup (Note: Refers to the Singapore Cup and CAF Confederation Cup competitions.)		Others		Total	
Club	League	Season	Apps	Goals	Apps	Goals	Apps	Goals	Apps	Goals	Apps	Goals
Home United	S.League	2015	22	4	2	0	4	2	—		28	6
Home United	S.League	2016	9	1	0	0	0	0	—		9	1
ASPL 2000	Mauritian Premier League	2017–18	0	0	0	0	—		—		0	0
ASPL 2000	Mauritian Premier League	2018–19	0	0	0	0	—		—		0	0
Total			31	5	2	0	4	2	—		37	7
Career total			31	5	2	0	4	2	—		37	7
