= Ashley Nazira =

Mauritian footballer

Personal information
- Full name: Steven Ashley Nazira
- Date of birth: 11 November 1995 (age 31)
- Place of birth: Pamplemousses District, Mauritius
- Height: 1.85 m (6 ft 1 in)
- Position: Forward

Team information
- Current team: Pamplemousses

Senior career*
Years	Team	Apps	(Gls)
2014–2019	Boulet Rouge	40	(61)
2020	San Diego Loyal	2	(0)
2021–2025	Saint-Pauloise FC	61	(27)
2025	Pamplemousses	20	(15)

International career
2015–	Mauritius	35	(11)
- * Club domestic league appearances and goals

Ashley Nazira (born 11 November 1995) is a Mauritian professional footballer, who plays as a forward for the Mauritius national football team. He played for San Diego Loyal SC, an American professional soccer team based in San Diego, California, during the 2020 USL Championship season. Since 2025, he now plays for Pamplemousses SC, in the Mauritian Premier League.

== Club career ==
Nazira began playing football at the age of six. He played for Boulet Rouge, a Mauritian Premier League club, for his entire career up until the 2019–2020 season. During his spell within Mauritian football, Nazira was the league's top goalscorer for four times.

Following his time spent in his homeland, Nazira then signed for San Diego Loyal SC, the new USL Championship expansion team, on a 12-month deal in January 2020. By doing so, he became the first ever Mauritian professional footballer to play in a top league in North America.

He previously had a successful trial with Réunion Premier League club Saint-Pauloise FC in February 2019 after being top goal scorer in the Mauritian first division with twenty goals. However the signing was put on hold by the club for financial reasons.

Two and a half years after his failed attempt to join Saint-Pauloise FC, he finally signed for the Réunionese club in September 2021.

== International career ==
Nazira made his senior international debut for Mauritius on 25 March 2015 in a 2–2 friendly draw with Burundi. With three goals, he was the join top-scorer at the 2019 COSAFA Cup.

=== International goals ===
Score and result list Mauritius's goal tally first.

#	Date	Venue	Opponent	Score	Result	Competition
1	21 March 2019	Churchill Park, Lautoka, Fiji	New Caledonia	3–1	3–1	Friendly
2	25 May 2019	King Zwelithini Stadium, Umlazi, South Africa	Eswatini	1–0	2–2	2019 COSAFA Cup
3	25 May 2019	King Zwelithini Stadium, Umlazi, South Africa	Eswatini	2–1	2–2	2019 COSAFA Cup
4	29 May 2019	King Zwelithini Stadium, Umlazi, South Africa	Comoros	1–1	1–2	2019 COSAFA Cup
5	18 July 2019	Stade George V, Curepipe, Mauritius	Seychelles	1–0	1–1	2019 Indian Ocean Island Games
6	22 July 2019	Stade George V, Curepipe, Mauritius	Madagascar	1–1	1–1	2019 Indian Ocean Island Games
7	13 October 2019	Estádio Nacional 12 de Julho, São Tomé, São Tomé and Príncipe	São Tomé and Príncipe	1–2	1–2	2021 Africa Cup of Nations qualification
8	27 March 2022	Anjalay Stadium, Belle Vue Harel, Mauritius	São Tomé and Príncipe	3–3	3–3	2023 Africa Cup of Nations qualification
9	11 June 2023	Complexe Sportif de Côte d'Or, Saint Pierre, Mauritius	Pakistan	2–0	3–0	Friendly
10	14 June 2023	Anjalay Stadium, Belle Vue Harel, Mauritius	Djibouti	1–0	1–3	Friendly
11	2 September 2023	Elgeco Plus Stadium, Antananarivo, Madagascar	Comoros	1–0	2–0	2023 Indian Ocean Island Games
Last updated 14 June 2023

== Career statistics ==
=== Club ===
Club	Season	Division	League		Cup		Continental		Total	
Club	Season	Division	Apps	Goals	Apps	Goals	Apps	Goals	Apps	Goals
Entente Boulet Rouge	2014-15	Mauritian Premier League	14	18	2	4			16	22
Entente Boulet Rouge	2015-16	Mauritian Premier League	1	1					1	1
Entente Boulet Rouge	2016-17	Mauritian Premier League	1	2					1	2
Entente Boulet Rouge	2017-18	Mauritian Premier League								
Entente Boulet Rouge	2018-19	Mauritian Premier League	14	21					14	21
Entente Boulet Rouge	2019-20	Mauritian Premier League	3	5	1	4			4	9
Entente Boulet Rouge	2020-21	Mauritian Premier League	7	14					7	14
Entente Boulet Rouge	Total		40	61	3	8			43	69
San Diego Loyal	2020		2	0					2	0
Saint Pauloise	2021	Regional 1	10	2					10	2
Saint Pauloise	2022	Regional 1	21	11					21	11
Saint Pauloise	2023	Regional 1	22	13					22	13
Saint Pauloise	2024	Regional 1	8	1					8	1
Saint Pauloise	Total		61	27					61	27
Pamplemousses	2025-26	Mauritian Premier League	18	13	6	9	2	1	26	23
Pamplemousses	2026-27	Mauritian Premier League	2	2					2	2
Pamplemousses	Total		20	15	6	9	2	1	28	23
Total career			121	103	8	17	2	1	132	121

=== International ===
As of match played 21 November 2023

Mauritius
Year	Apps	Goals
2015	3	0
2018	1	0
2019	12	7
2022	5	1
2023	12	3
Total	33	11
