= Fidy Rasoanaivo =

Association football player

Étienne Fidy Rasoanaivo
Personal information
- Full name: Etienne Olivier Fidy Rasoanaivo
- Date of birth: 22 September 1968 (age 58)
- Place of birth: Madagascar
- Position: Midfielder

Senior career*
Years	Team	Apps	(Gls)
- 67 Hectares/Ha
- BFV
- Sunrise Flacq United

International career
1993–1999	Madagascar	19	(5)

Managerial career
- 2000–2001: Olympique de Moka (assistant)
- 2001–2003: Mauritian club (assistant)
- 2003–20xx: Mauritian club
- 2009–2011: US Beau Bassin-Rose Hill
- 2011: Madagascar (staff)
- 2011–2012: AS Port-Louis 2000
- 2012: Curepipe Starlight SC
- –2015: Curepipe Starlight SC
- Pamplemousses SC
- –2017: Petite Rivière Noire FC
- 2017: Mauritius U20
- * Club domestic league appearances and goals

Étienne Fidy Rasoanaivo (born 22 September 1968 in Madagascar) is a Malagasy football coach and former footballer.

== Mauritius ==
Coach of Curepipe Starlight SC, Rasoanaivo aimed for a treble of trophies in 2013, an achievement unparalleled in the club's recent history. He was then Curepipe Starlight's coach again in 2015 but was dismissed as the board were not satisfied with results.

Commenting on the level of the professional Mauritian Premier League in 2016, the Malagasy trainer stated that the league should make changes for the next season and that teams receive more funding to pay their squad.

== Personal life ==
Married to Jolene, a Mauritian woman, since 1997, Rasoanaivo is the father of three children: two daughters and one son.

He is the brother of Rado Rasoanaivo.
