= Stéphane Badul =

Mauritian footballer

Personal information
- Full name: Louis Stéphane Badul
- Date of birth: February 3, 1983 (age 43)
- Place of birth: Mauritius
- Position: Midfielder

Team information
- Current team: Petite Rivière Noire SC

Senior career*
| Years | Team | Apps | (Gls) |
| 2004–2007 | ASVP | – | (–) |
| 2007–2008 | PAS Mates | – | (–) |
| 2008–2009 | Étoile de l'Ouest | – | (–) |
| 2010– | Petite Rivière Noire SC | – | (–) |

International career^{‡}
| 2007– | Mauritius | 9 | (0) |
- * Club domestic league appearances and goals as of June 24, 2011 ‡ National team caps and goals as of August 20, 2011

Stéphane Badul (born February 3, 1983) is a Mauritian footballer who currently plays for Petite Rivière Noire SC in the Mauritian League as a midfielder.

== Career ==
=== Senior career ===
Badul has played for numerous clubs in Mauritius, including ASVP and Petite Rivière Noire SC, his current club.

==== Controversy ====
During the 2011 Mauritian League, ASPL 2000 accused Badul of playing for his club Petite Rivière Noire SC illegally due to yellow card accumulation. The MFA looked into the matter and suspended Badul from taking part in domestic footballing activities for 6 months.

=== International career ===
Badul has represented Mauritius since 2007.
