= Gurty Calambé =

Mauritian footballer (born 1990)

Personal information
- Full name: Jean Gurty Earny Winny Calambé
- Date of birth: 14 May 1990 (age 36)
- Place of birth: Bambous, Rivière Noire, Mauritius
- Height: 6 ft 0 in (1.83 m)
- Position: Forward

Team information
- Current team: Petite Rivière Noire SC
- Number: 22

Youth career
- 2006–2008: CTR-West
- 2008–2009: CTN-François Blacquart

Senior career*
Years	Team	Apps	(Gls)
2009–2010	Etoile de L'Ouest	23	(22)
2011–	Petite Rivière Noire SC	–	(–)

International career^{‡}
2006–2007	Mauritius U-17	–	(–)
2008–2009	Mauritius U-20	–	(–)
2010–	Mauritius	11	(3)
- * Club domestic league appearances and goals as of 7 May 2011 ‡ National team caps and goals as of 21 July 2013

Gurty Calambé (born 14 May 1990 in Bambous, Rivière Noire) is a Mauritian footballer who played as a forward for Petite Rivière Noire SC in the Mauritian League and the Mauritius national football team.

== Career ==
=== Youth career ===
As a youth, Calambé loved playing street football; at the age of 16 he was approached by CTR de Bambous director Michael Mootoosamy, who invited him to join the CTR-West. After two years in that academy, Ashley Mocudé and Rajen Dorasami brought him into the premier youth football academy in Mauritius, the Center Technique National-François Blacquart, where he trained until 2009.

=== Senior career ===
Calambé started off his professional career in 2009 with Bambous Etoile de L'Ouest SC. He quickly emerged as a rising young talent. In his second season, he exploded with 22 goals in league play, capped off with a six-goal performance against Entente Boulet Rouge. That was enough for him to earn Top Scorer title for the 2010 season. He is described as one of the hottest prospect for the future of Mauritian football. During the offseason, he transferred to Petite Rivière Noire SC. He has expressed interest in playing in Ligue 1, preferably for Paris Saint-Germain F.C. or AS Saint-Étienne.

=== International career ===
Calambé has been called up various times to represent Mauritius at the youth level. In 2010, he received his first call up to the Mauritian national team in a 2012 AFCON qualifying game against Cameroon, but didn't make an appearance. In his second call up, he was supposed to travel with the team to Senegal for another 2012 AFCON qualifying match, but stayed in Mauritius for unknown reasons. On 27 March 2011, he received his first cap for Mauritius in an AFCON Qualifying match against DR Congo. On 18 May 2011, in an unofficial friendly between Mauritius and the Fulham Academy, Calambé scored the lone goal to lead Mauritius to victory. On 9 August 2011, Calambé finally scored his first official goal for Mauritius in their 2 – 0 win in the group stage of the 2011 Indian Ocean Island Games football tournament over Comoros to help secure Club M's place in the knockout stage. In 2012, Calambé once again scored against Comoros, this time in 2014 CHAN Qualifying. In 2013, Calambé scored the opening goal in his team's 4–0 win over bitter rivals Seychelles at the 2013 COSAFA Cup, exiting the competition on a high note having already been eliminated in the group stage.

==== International goals ====
#	Date	Location	Opponent	Score	Result	Competition
1.	9 August 2011	Stade d'Amitié, Praslin, Seychelles	Comoros	2–0	Win	2011 IOIG
2.	1 December 2012	Stade George V, Curepipe, Mauritius	Comoros	2–0	Win	2014 CHAN Qualifying
3.	10 July 2013	Nkana Stadium, Kitwe, Zambia	Seychelles	4–0	Win	2013 COSAFA Cup

==== International career statistics ====
Mauritius national team
Year	Apps	Goals
2011	6	1
2012	3	1
2013	2	1
Total	11	3

== Personal ==
Calambé was born to parents Curtis Calambé, a former player most notably of Fire Brigade SC, and Noëlla. He is the oldest of two children, with a brother named Eurny, who also plays football.

== Honors ==
=== Individual ===
- Mauritian League Top Goalscorer: 2010 Season

Awards and achievements
Preceded by Tony François	Mauritian League Top Goalscorer; 2010	Succeeded by Sewram Gobin and Branli Zizi Ratovonirina
