= Jean Gilbert Bayaram =

Mauritian football player

Personal information
- Full name: Jean Gilbert Bayaram
- Date of birth: July 7, 1974 (age 52)
- Place of birth: Mauritius
- Position: Midfielder

Team information
- Current team: Pamplemousses SC

Senior career*
Years	Team	Apps	(Gls)
1994–2001	Olympique de Moka		
2001–2002	US Beau Bassin/Rose Hill		
2002–2007	AS Port-Louis 2000		
2007–	Pamplemousses SC		

International career
1995–2008	Mauritius	64	(1)
- * Club domestic league appearances and goals

Jean Gilbert Bayaram (born July 7, 1974) is a Mauritian football player who currently plays for Pamplemousses SC in the Mauritian Premier League and for the Mauritius national football team as a midfielder. He is featured on the Mauritian national team in the official 2010 FIFA World Cup video game.

== Career statistics ==
=== International ===
Appearances and goals by national team and year
National team	Year	Apps	Goals
Mauritius	1995	2	0
Mauritius	1996	5	0
Mauritius	1997	5	0
Mauritius	1998	6	0
Mauritius	1999	6	0
Mauritius	2000	5	0
Mauritius	2001	6	0
Mauritius	2002	1	0
Mauritius	2003	9	0
Mauritius	2004	2	0
Mauritius	2005	5	1
Mauritius	2006	6	0
Mauritius	2007	5	0
Mauritius	2008	1	0
Total		64	1

Scores and results list Mauritius's goal tally first, score column indicates score after each Bayaram goal.

List of international goals scored by Jean Gilbert Bayaram
No.	Date	Venue	Opponent	Score	Result	Competition
1	16 December 2005	George V Stadium, Curepipe, Mauritius	Réunion	1–1	1–1	Friendly
