= Francis Rasolofonirina =

Footballer (born 1986)

Personal information
- Full name: Maminiaina Francis Rasolofonirina
- Date of birth: 22 July 1986 (age 40)
- Place of birth: Tsihombe, Madagascar
- Height: 1.77 m (5 ft 10 in)
- Position: Centre-back

Senior career*
Years	Team	Apps	(Gls)
- North Star
2007	USCA Foot		
2008–2016	Petite Rivière Noire		
2016–2018	Cercle de Joachim SC		
2019–2024	AS Vacoas-Phoenix		

International career
2015–2023	Mauritius	47	(2)
- * Club domestic league appearances and goals

Maminiaina Francis Rasolofonirina (born 22 July 1986) is a former footballer who played as a centre-back. Born in Madagascar, he made 47 appearances for the Mauritius national team scoring twice.

== Club career ==
Rasolofonirina was born in Tsihombe, Madagascar. He moved to Toliara to play for North Star before joining USCA Foot. After one season with USCA Foot, he signed with Mauritian club Petite Rivière Noire. He remained with Petite Rivière Noire until 2016, when he moved to Curepipe-based Cercle de Joachim SC who offered a "huge contract". The transfer fee paid to Petite Rivière Noire was reported as Rs50,000. For the 2019–20 season, he went to AS Vacoas-Phoenix.

== International career ==
Rasolofonirina made his debut for the Mauritius national team in 2015. In March 2016 he scored the only goal in a 1–0 win in 2017 Africa Cup of Nations qualification against Rwanda, preserving Mauritius' chances of qualification.

== Style of play ==
In 2016 Mauritian newspaper Défi Sport described Rasolofonirina as "one of the best full-backs" in the country. In 2020 Clément Rabary of Midi Madagasikara highlighted Rasolofonirina's "intelligence and vision" as centre-back.

== Personal life ==
Rasolofonirina has Mauritian nationality. He is married to a Mauritian woman with whom he has a son.

== Career statistics ==
Appearances and goals by national team and year
National team	Year	Apps	Goals
Mauritius	2015	8	0
Mauritius	2016	7	1
Mauritius	2017	12	1
Mauritius	2018	7	0
Mauritius	2019	10	0
Mauritius	2023	3	0
Total		47	2

Scores and results list Mauritius' goal tally first, score column indicates score after each Rasolofonirina goal.

List of international goals scored by Francis Rasolofonirina
No.	Date	Venue	Opponent	Score	Result	Competition	Ref.
1	26 March 2016	Stade Anjalay, Belle Vue Maurel, Mauritius	Rwanda	1–0	1–0	2017 Africa Cup of Nations qualification	
2	22 April 2017	Stade Anjalay, Belle Vue Maurel, Mauritius	Seychelles	2–0	2–1	2018 African Nations Championship qualification	
