= 2018 COSAFA Under-17 Championship =

Tournament details
- Host country: Mauritius
- Dates: 19–29 July 2018
- Teams: 12
- Venue: 2 (in 2 host cities)

Final positions
- Champions: Angola (1st title)
- Runners-up: South Africa
- Third place: Namibia
- Fourth place: Mauritius

Tournament statistics
- Top scorer: (Namibia) Prins Tjiueza (6)

The 2018 COSAFA Under-17 Championship is the 7th edition of the COSAFA U-17 Championship, an association football tournament organised by the Council of Southern Africa Football Associations (COSAFA) involving teams from Southern Africa for players aged 17 and below.

COSAFA announced that the COSAFA U-17 Championship hosted by Mauritius between 19–29 July 2018 would be the region's qualifying tournament for the 2019 Africa U-17 Cup of Nations in Tanzania.

== Participating teams ==
- Angola
- Botswana
- Lesotho
- Mauritius
- Malawi
- Mozambique
- Namibia
- South Africa
- Seychelles
- Swaziland
- Zambia
- Zimbabwe

== Officials ==
Referees

- Ibrahim Amisy Tsimanohitsy (Madagascar)
- Tshepo Mokani Gobagoba (Botswana)
- António Dungula (Angola)
- Ishmael Chizinga (Malawi)
- Derrick Kafuli (Zambia)
- Retselisitsoe David Molise (Lesotho)
- Ganesh Chutooree (Mauritius)

Assistant Referees

- Ravoharizo Randrianarivelo (Madagascar)
- Zacarias H. Baloi (Mozambique)
- Mapoho Mapoho (Lesotho)
- Sem Moses Singeve (Namibia)
- Said Omar Chebli (Comoros)
- Shailesh Gobin (Mauritius)
- Ram Babajee (Mauritius)
- Tafadzwa Nkala (Zimbabwe)
- (Eswatini) Gcina Sam Mamba (Swaziland)

== Draw ==
The draw for the group stage was held on 31 May 2018.

== Venues ==
The tournament will be played at Port Louis (St. François Xavier Stadium) and Belle Vue Maurel (Anjalay Stadium).

== Group stage ==
All times are local, MUT (UTC+4).

=== Group A ===
| Pos | Team | Pld | W | D | L | GF | GA | GD | Pts | Qualification |
|---|---|---|---|---|---|---|---|---|---|---|
| 1 | Namibia | 3 | 2 | 0 | 1 | 10 | 4 | +6 | 6 (Note: Head-to-head results: Mauritius 0–1 Botswana, Mauritius 1–0 Namibia, Namibia 2–0 Botswana. Head-to-head standings: Namibia: 3 pts, +1 GD; Mauritius: 3 pts, 0 GD; Botswana: 3 pts, −1 GD) | Semi-finals |
| 2 | Mauritius (H) | 3 | 2 | 0 | 1 | 7 | 2 | +5 | 6 | Semi-finals |
| 3 | Botswana | 3 | 2 | 0 | 1 | 3 | 3 | 0 | 6 | |
| 4 | Seychelles | 3 | 0 | 0 | 3 | 5 | 16 | −11 | 0 | |

Source: CAF
Rules for classification: Group tiebreakers
(H) Hosts
Notes:
19 July 2018
10:00

| Namibia | 8–3 | Seychelles |
|---|---|---|
| George 3', 16', 55'; Kamatuka 18'; Tjiueza 38', 68', 72', 84' (pen.) | Report | Aboudou 7'; Suzette 14'; Pauline 19' |

St. François Xavier Stadium, Port Louis
Referee: Kasokota Kafuli Derrick (Zambia)
19 July 2018
15:30

| Mauritius | 0–1 | Botswana |
|---|---|---|
| | Report | Maphorisa 83' (pen.) |

St. François Xavier Stadium, Port Louis
Referee: Antonio Caluassi Dungula (Angola)

21 July 2018
12:00

| Botswana | 2–1 | Seychelles |
|---|---|---|
| Maphorisa 13' (pen.); Kopelang 38' | Report | Pauline 65' |

St. François Xavier Stadium, Port Louis
Referee: Retselisitsoe David Molise (Lesotho)
21 July 2018
15:00

| Mauritius | 1–0 | Namibia |
|---|---|---|
| Kawoa 69' | Report |

St. François Xavier Stadium, Port Louis
Referee: Ben Amisy Tsimanohitsy Ibrahim (Madagascar)

24 July 2018
12:00

| Namibia | 2–0 | Botswana |
|---|---|---|
| Tjiueza 39'; Tsuseb 59' | Report |

Anjalay Stadium, Belle Vue Maurel
Referee: Antonio Caluassi Dungula (Angola)
24 July 2018
12:00

| Seychelles | 1–6 | Mauritius |
|---|---|---|
| Suzette 53' | Report | Gentil 58'; Aristide 59', 87'; Philibert 69'; Genave 78'; Hoareau 90' (o.g.) |

St. François Xavier Stadium, Port Louis
Referee: Ben Amisy Tsimanohitsy Ibrahim (Madagascar)

=== Group B ===
| Pos | Team | Pld | W | D | L | GF | GA | GD | Pts | Qualification |
|---|---|---|---|---|---|---|---|---|---|---|
| 1 | South Africa | 3 | 2 | 1 | 0 | 6 | 2 | +4 | 7 | Semi-finals |
| 2 | Zambia | 3 | 1 | 1 | 1 | 2 | 2 | 0 | 4 | |
| 3 | Mozambique | 3 | 1 | 1 | 1 | 3 | 5 | −2 | 4 | |
| 4 | Lesotho | 3 | 0 | 1 | 2 | 1 | 3 | −2 | 1 | |

Source: CAF
Rules for classification: Group tiebreakers
19 July 2018
12:30

| Zambia | 0–0 | Mozambique |
|---|---|---|
| | Report |

St. François Xavier Stadium, Port Louis
Referee: Ben Amisy Tsimanohitsy Ibrahim (Madagascar)
20 July 2018
15:30

| Lesotho | 0–0 | South Africa |
|---|---|---|
| | Report |

Anjalay Stadium, Belle Vue Maurel
Referee: Ishmael Chizinga (Malawi)

22 July 2018
12:00

| Mozambique | 1–4 | South Africa |
|---|---|---|
| Pablo 63' | Report | Siyasi 7'; Nare 48'; Buthelezi 75'; Balakasi 86' |

Anjalay Stadium, Belle Vue Maurel
Referee: Kasokota Kafuli Derrick (Zambia)
22 July 2018
15:00

| Zambia | 1–0 | Lesotho |
|---|---|---|
| Kalinda 89' | Report |

Anjalay Stadium, Belle Vue Maurel
Referee: Antonio Caluassi Dungula (Angola)

24 July 2018
15:00

| Lesotho | 1–2 | Mozambique |
|---|---|---|
| Rapuleng 81' | Report | Pablo 2'; José 13' |

Anjalay Stadium, Belle Vue Maurel
Referee: Kasokota Kafuli Derrick (Zambia)
24 July 2018
15:00

| South Africa | 2–1 | Zambia |
|---|---|---|
| Buthelezi 12'; Radiopane 81' | Report | Kalinda 7' |

St. François Xavier Stadium, Port Louis
Referee: Ganesh Chutooree (Mauritius)

=== Group C ===
| Pos | Team | Pld | W | D | L | GF | GA | GD | Pts | Qualification |
|---|---|---|---|---|---|---|---|---|---|---|
| 1 | Angola | 3 | 3 | 0 | 0 | 7 | 1 | +6 | 9 | Semi-finals |
| 2 | Malawi | 3 | 2 | 0 | 1 | 6 | 1 | +5 | 6 | |
| 3 | Swaziland | 3 | 1 | 0 | 2 | 3 | 7 | −4 | 3 | |
| 4 | Zimbabwe | 3 | 0 | 0 | 3 | 3 | 10 | −7 | 0 | |

Source: CAF
Rules for classification: Group tiebreakers
20 July 2018
10:00

| Angola | 1–0 | Malawi |
|---|---|---|
| Netinho 20' | Report |

Anjalay Stadium, Belle Vue Maurel
Referee: Tshepo Mokani Gobagoba (Botswana)
20 July 2018
12:30

| Swaziland | 3–2 | Zimbabwe |
|---|---|---|
| Shabangu 20', 86'; L. Dlamini 26' | Report | Ngwenya 60'; Bonomali 65' |

Anjalay Stadium, Belle Vue Maurel
Referee: Ganesh Chutooree (Mauritius)

23 July 2018
12:00

| Malawi | 5–0 | Zimbabwe |
|---|---|---|
| Mwaungulu 8', 77'; Mbalaka 24'; Mtoso 56'; Mitole 79' | Report |

St. François Xavier Stadium, Port Louis
Referee: Tshepo Mokani Gobagoba (Botswana)
23 July 2018
15:00

| Angola | 4–0 | Swaziland |
|---|---|---|
| Zito 3', 69'; Domingos 63'; Gege 90+1' | Report |

St. François Xavier Stadium, Port Louis
Referee: Ganesh Chutooree (Mauritius)

25 July 2018
15:30

| Swaziland | 0–1 | Malawi |
|---|---|---|
| | Report | Mbeta 28' |

Anjalay Stadium, Belle Vue Maurel
Referee: Retselisitsoe David Molise (Lesotho)
25 July 2018
15:30

| Zimbabwe | 1–2 | Angola |
|---|---|---|
| Mandinyenya 62' | Report | Nzanza 45'; Barri 45+1' |

St. François Xavier Stadium, Port Louis
Referee: Ben Amisy Tsimanohitsy Ibrahim (Madagascar)

=== Ranking of second-placed teams ===
| Pos | Grp | Team | Pld | W | D | L | GF | GA | GD | Pts | Qualification |
|---|---|---|---|---|---|---|---|---|---|---|---|
| 1 | A | Mauritius | 3 | 2 | 0 | 1 | 7 | 2 | +5 | 6 | Semi-finals |
| 2 | C | Malawi | 3 | 2 | 0 | 1 | 6 | 1 | +5 | 6 | |
| 3 | B | Zambia | 3 | 1 | 1 | 1 | 2 | 2 | 0 | 4 | |

Source: CAF
Rules for classification: Group tiebreakers

=== Knockout stage ===
Semi-finals
27 July – Port Louis
South Africa | 2
Mauritius | 0
27 July – Port Louis
Namibia | 0
Angola | 7

Final
29 July – Port Louis
South Africa | 0
Angola | 1
Third place
29 July – Port Louis
Mauritius | 1
Namibia | 2

==== Semi-finals ====
27 July 2018
12:30

| South Africa | 2–0 | Mauritius |
|---|---|---|
| Nare 27'; Dupre 88' (o.g.) | Report |

St. François Xavier Stadium, Port Louis
Referee: Ishmael Chizinga (Malawi)
27 July 2018
15:30

| Namibia | 0–7 | Angola |
|---|---|---|
| | Report | Capita 46', 67', 69' (pen.); Cisco 71', 87'; Zito 78'; Barri 84' |

St. François Xavier Stadium, Port Louis
Referee: Ben Amisy Tsimanohitsy Ibrahim (Madagascar)

==== Third place match ====
29 July 2018
11:00

| Mauritius | 1–2 | Namibia |
|---|---|---|
| Kawoa 38' | Report | Tjiueza 7'; Kandjii 44' |

St. François Xavier Stadium, Port Louis
Referee: Kasokota Kafuli Derrick (Zambia)

==== Final ====
Winner qualifies for 2019 Africa U-17 Cup of Nations.

29 July 2018
15:00

| South Africa | 0–1 | Angola |
|---|---|---|
| | Report | Capita 5' |

St. François Xavier Stadium, Port Louis
Referee: Retselisitsoe David Molise (Lesotho)

2018 COSAFA Under 17 Champions

Angola
