= 2016–17 Mauritian Premier League =

Mauritian Premier League
- Season: 2016–17
- Champions: Pamplemousses SC
- Relegated: GRSE Wanderers SC and AS Riviere du Rempart
- Champions League: Pamplemousses SC
- Confederation Cup: Petite Rivière Noire FC
- Top goalscorer: Stephane Pierre (21)
- Highest scoring: AS Port-Louis 2000 9-1 AS Rivière du Rempart

The 2016–17 Mauritian Premier League season was the 37th edition of topflight Mauritian Premier League football competition in Mauritius. The season started on 22 October 2016 and concluded on 18 June 2017.

Pamplemousses SC successfully pursued its 2017 title.

== Standings ==
Pos	Team	Pld	W	D	L	GF	GA	GD	Pts	Qualification or relegation
1	Pamplemousses SC	36	22	7	7	77	40	+37	73	Champions, Champions League
2	Petite Rivière Noire FC	36	22	6	8	63	40	+23	72	Confederation Cup
3	Roche-Bois Bolton City	36	20	9	7	44	26	+18	69	
4	AS Port-Louis 2000	36	19	5	12	66	37	+29	62	
5	AS Quatre-Bornes	36	14	12	10	42	36	+6	54	
6	La Cure Sylvester SC	36	14	6	16	58	45	+13	48	
7	Cercle de Joachim	36	12	5	19	46	65	−19	41	
8	Savanne SC	36	9	8	19	51	76	−25	35	
9	AS Rivière du Rempart	36	8	10	18	40	67	−27	34	Relegated to Second League
10	Grande Rivière Sud Est Wanderers SC	36	4	4	28	39	94	−55	16	Relegated to Second League
