= Aboobakar Augustin =

Mauritian footballer

Personal information
- Full name: Aboobakar Augustin
- Date of birth: September 28, 1983 (age 43)
- Place of birth: Mauritius
- Position: Goalkeeper

Team information
- Current team: Cercle de Joachim

Senior career*
Years	Team	Apps	(Gls)
2008–2010	Savanne SC		
2011–2013	Petite Rivière Noire SC		
2013–	Cercle de Joachim		

International career^{‡}
2009–	Mauritius	5	(0)
- * Club domestic league appearances and goals as of June 17, 2011 ‡ National team caps and goals as of May 24, 2013

Aboobakar Augustin (born September 28, 1983) is a Mauritian footballer who currently plays for Cercle de Joachim in the Mauritian League as a goalkeeper.

== Career ==
=== Senior career ===
Augustin started off his professional career in 2008 with Savanne SC. In 2011, he transferred to Petite Rivière Noire SC. In 2013, he moved to fellow Mauritian Premier League club Cercle de Joachim.

=== International career ===
Augustin has earned five caps for Mauritius since 2009.
