= Cédric Permal =

Mauritian footballer

Personal information
- Full name: Jean Emmanuel Cédric Permal
- Date of birth: December 8, 1991 (age 34)
- Place of birth: Vacoas-Phoenix, Mauritius
- Positions: Defender; midfielder

Team information
- Current team: AS de Vacoas-Phoenix

Senior career*
Years	Team	Apps	(Gls)
2011– 2014	AS de Vacoas-Phoenix	–	(–)
2014–	Cercle de Joachim		

International career^{‡}
2007–2009	Mauritius U-17		
2009–	Mauritius U-20		
2011–2016	Mauritius	15	(0)
- * Club domestic league appearances and goals as of August 9, 2011 ‡ National team caps and goals as of August 20, 2011

Cédric Permal (born December 8, 1991, in Mauritius) is a Mauritian footballer who currently plays for AS de Vacoas-Phoenix in the Mauritian League as a defender and midfielder.

== Career ==
=== Senior career ===
Permal started his professional career with AS de Vacoas-Phoenix after signing with them in 2011 before the 2011 season.

=== International career ===
Permal has been called up various times to represent Mauritius at the youth level. In 2011, he received his first cap for the Mauritian national team in a 2012 AFCON qualifying game against DR Congo. Later in the year, he was called up to represent Mauritius in the 2011 Indian Ocean Island Games. He appeared in one game, against Mayotte.
