= Praxis Rabemananjara =

Malagasy footballer (born 1983)

Personal information
- Full name: Stéphane Praxis Rabemananjara
- Date of birth: September 9, 1983 (age 43)
- Place of birth: Madagascar
- Height: 1.80 m (5 ft 11 in)
- Position: Striker

Team information
- Current team: Saint-Denis FC
- Number: 10

Senior career*
Years	Team	Apps	(Gls)
2000–2001	Sirama Namakia		
2001–2004	US Transfoot		
2004–present	Pamplemousses SC		(59)

International career
2001–2008	Madagascar	13	(6)
- * Club domestic league appearances and goals as of January 27, 2007

Stéphane Praxis Rabemananjara (born September 9, 1983) is a Malagasy former footballer who played as a striker. He has played for the Madagascar national football team.

== International career ==
=== International goals ===
Scores and results list Madagascar's goal tally first.

No	Date	Venue	Opponent	Score	Result	Competition
1.	9 November 2008	Stade George V, Curepipe, Mauritius	Mauritius	0–1	0–2	Friendly
2.	9 November 2008	Stade George V, Curepipe, Mauritius	Mauritius	0–2	0–2	Friendly
3.	21 July 2008	Atlantic Stadium, Witbank, South Africa	Eswatini	1–1	1–1	2008 COSAFA Cup
4.	26 July 2008	Atlantic Stadium, Witbank, South Africa	Mauritius	1–2	1–2	2008 COSAFA Cup
5.	30 July 2008	Thulamahashe Stadium, South Africa	Angola U-20s	0–1	0–1	2008 COSAFA Cup
6.	30 July 2008	Thulamahashe Stadium, South Africa	Mozambique	1–1	2–1	2008 COSAFA Cup
7.	7 Septembre 2008	Mahamasina Municipal Stadium, Antananarivo	Botswana	1–1	1–2	2010 FIFA World Cup qualification

== Club ==
Leopards Transfoot Toamasina

- Coupe de Madagascar (1) : 2003

Pamplemousses SC

- Mauritian League (1) : 2006
- Mauritian Cup (1) : 2006

=== Individual ===
Pamplemousses SC

- Top scorer Mauritian League (4) : 2004, 2005, 2006, 2007

Saint-Denis FC

- Top scorer Réunion Premier League (1) : 2010
