= Joe Tshupula =

Belgian football director and former player

Personal information
- Full name: Joe Hubert Tshupula Kande
- Date of birth: 15 May 1972 (age 54)
- Place of birth: Kinshasa, DR Congo
- Position: Forward

Youth career
- FC Verrewinkel

Senior career*
Years	Team	Apps	(Gls)
- FC Verrewinkel
- CS Nivelles
- FC Bordeaux
- Gazélec Ajaccio
- Le Havre AC
1998–1999	Rhodienne-Verrewinkel		
1999–2000	A.F.C. Tubize		
2001	Kidderminster Harriers F.C. (trial)		

Managerial career
- 2005–2006: Royale Union Saint-Gilloise
- 2008–2009: Daring Club Motema Pembe
- 2010–2011: AS Rivière du Rempart (Technical Adviser)
- 2012–2013: AS Port-Louis 2000
- 2013–2016: Cercle de Joachim SC
- 2016–2017: Mauritius
- * Club domestic league appearances and goals

Joe Tshupula (born 15 May 1972) is a Belgian–Congolese football director who is the head of the Academie de Football Nord in Mauritius.

== Early life ==
Emigrating to Belgium aged ten, Tshupula was not linked to any team until he was 15 due to not knowing of any local outfit.

== Mauritius ==
Succeeding Fidy Rasoanaivo as the AS Port-Louis 2000 coach in 2012, Tshupula was put in to handle Cercle de Joachim the next year, spurring them to 20 points in the first half of 2013-14 and capturing that season's trophy. He oversaw a repeat of that success in 2014-15 before stepping down to spend more tome with his family. Interested in handling the Mauritius national team, the Belgian worked with Frenchman Alain Happe as assistant by September 2015, before taking his place and steering the young team to 142nd place on the world rankings, their furthest position since May 2007, by June the next year despite failing to qualify for the 2017 Africa Cup of Nations with two draws as well as two defeats in Group H, giving in to Rwanda 0-5 their last game. However, when Mauritius were bettered by Comoros and they failed to reach the 2019 Africa Cup of Nations, there was speculation about the former frontman's dismissal, finally resigning in 2017 after getting bettered by Angola 3–2, with Brazilian Francisco Filho taking his place.

About football in Mauritius, the Kinshasa native stated that it was more relaxed, not as tactical, and was more of a recreation than a job despite the league being professional, comparing it to the Belgian promotion. In addition, he believes that there is potential among young Mauritian footballers and that the national selection can qualify for the Africa Cup of Nations in the future.

== Personal life ==
Joe Tshupula is able to understand and speak Creole.

Has a wife and a son who live with him in Mauritius.
