= Tony François =

Mauritian footballer

Personal information
- Full name: Tony François
- Date of birth: 11 April 1971 (age 55)
- Place of birth: Mauritius
- Position: Striker

Senior career*
| Years | Team | Apps | (Gls) |
| 2000–2002 | Pamplemousses SC | ? | (?) |
| 2002–2005 | US Beau Bassin-Rose Hill | ? | (?) |
| 2005–2007 | Pamplemousses SC | ? | (29) |
| 2007–2008 | AS Rivière du Rempart | ? | (17) |

International career
| 1993–2006 | Mauritius | 34 | (9) |

Managerial career
- 2021–2023: Mauritius (head coach)
- * Club domestic league appearances and goals

Tony François (born 11 April 1971) is a Mauritian football coach and former footballer who played as a striker. He played for the Mauritius national football team from 1993 to 2006.

== Career statistics ==
=== International goals ===
| # | Date | Venue | Opponent | Score | Result | Competition |
|---|---|---|---|---|---|---|
| 1. | 28 August 1993 | Stade Linite, Victoria, Seychelles | Seychelles | 6–2 | Win | 1993 Indian Ocean Games |
| 2. | 2 November 1997 | National Stadium, Lobamba, Swaziland | Swaziland | 1–0 | Win | Friendly |
| 3. | 15 August 1998 | Stade Linite, Saint-Denis, Réunion | Seychelles | 3–4 | Loss | 1998 Indian Ocean Games |
| 4. | 15 August 1998 | Stade Linite, Saint-Denis, Réunion | Seychelles | 3–4 | Loss | 1998 Indian Ocean Games |
| 5. | 30 May 1999 | Setsoto Stadium, Maseru, Lesotho | Lesotho | 2–1 | Win | Friendly |
| 6. | 20 June 1999 | Stade Paulo Brabant, Les Avirons, Réunion | Gabon | 2–2 | Draw | 2000 African Cup of Nations Q. |
| 7. | 12 October 1999 | Kowloon, Hong Kong | Hong Kong | 3–4 | Loss | Friendly |
| 8. | 16 July 2000 | Stade George V, Curepipe, Mauritius | Tanzania | 3–2 | Win | 2002 African Cup of Nations Q. |
| 9. | 13 January 2001 | Stade Anjalay, Belle Vue Harel, Mauritius | South Africa | 1–1 | Draw | 2002 African Cup of Nations Q. |
Correct as of 17 April 2021
