= Stéphan Nabab =

Mauritian footballer

Personal information
- Full name: Jean Stéphan Nabab
- Date of birth: 29 February 1992 (age 34)
- Place of birth: Surinam, Mauritius
- Height: 1.84 m (6 ft 0 in)
- Position: Midfielder

Team information
- Current team: Savanne

Senior career*
Years	Team	Apps	(Gls)
2010	CTN François Blaquart		
2011–2012	Savanne		
2012–2013	Cercle de Joachim		
2013–2015	Curepipe Starlight		
2015–2017	Savanne		
2017–2018	Port-Louis 2000		
2018–	Savanne		

International career^{‡}
2011–	Mauritius	15	(1)
- * Club domestic league appearances and goals as of 01:55, 21 November 2021 (UTC) ‡ National team caps and goals as of 01:55, 21 November 2021 (UTC)

Jean Stéphan Nabab (born 29 February 1992) is a Mauritian professional footballer who plays as a midfielder for Mauritian Premier League club Savanne and the Mauritius national team.

== Club career ==
Nabab has played club football for CTN François Blaquart, Savanne, Cercle de Joachim, Curepipe Starlight, and Port-Louis 2000.

== International career ==
Nabab made his international debut for Mauritius in 2011.

=== International goals ===
Scores and results list Mauritius' goal tally first.

No.	Date	Venue	Opponent	Score	Result	Competition
1.	9 October 2017	Estadio de Bata, Bata, Equatorial Guinea	Equatorial Guinea	1–1	1–3	Friendly
