= Sarjoo Gowreesunkur =

Footballer

Personal information
- Place of birth: Mauritius
- Position: Centre back

Senior career*
Years	Team	Apps	(Gls)
?	Hindu Cadets		
?	Fire Brigade SC		
?	Sunrise Flacq United		

International career
?	Mauritius		

Managerial career
- ?: Sunrise Flacq United
- 2006: Mauritius
- ?: ASPL 2000
- ?: Curepipe Starlight SC
- * Club domestic league appearances and goals

Sarjoo Gowreesunkur is a former footballer who served as the Mauritius national football team coach in 1996 and 2006. He has also been a player and coach of Sunrise Flacq United in the 1990s. He resigned from the position coach in August 2007 following the poor performance of the national team during the Indian Ocean Games. He was later coach of AS Port-Louis 2000 and Curepipe Starlight SC. He now hosts a talk show about football on the radio in Mauritius.

== Playing career ==
Sarjoo Gowreesunkur played with 3 different clubs, including Hindu Cadets, Fire Brigade SC and Sunrise Flacq United during 10 years (1979–1989) as a centre back. He has been called several times to play for the national team. He was the youngest captain of the Mauritius national football team in 1984 at the age of 23. He had to stop his career in 1989 due to injury.

== Awards ==
=== Individual ===
- Coach of the Year (team sports): 2006
