= Nicholas Doro =

Mauritian football player

Personal information
- Date of birth: December 27, 1974 (age 51)
- Place of birth: Mauritius
- Height: 1.80 m (5 ft 11 in)
- Position: Goalkeeper

Team information
- Current team: AS Rivière du Rempart
- Number: 1

Senior career*
Years	Team	Apps	(Gls)
2000–2004	Olympique de Moka		
2004–2009	Pamplemousses SC		
2009–2011	AS Rivière du Rempart		
2011–	Pamplemousses SC		

International career^{‡}
2000–2006	Mauritius	16	(0)
- * Club domestic league appearances and goals as of October 31, 2010 ‡ National team caps and goals as of October 31, 2010

Nicholas Doro (born December 27, 1974) is a Mauritian football player who previously played for AS Rivière du Rempart as a goalkeeper. He currently plays for Pamplemousses SC. He has also represented Mauritius internationally with the national team.
