= Rajesh Gunesh =

Mauritian footballer (born 1962)

Personal information
- Date of birth: 26 October 1962 (age 64)
- Place of birth: Mauritius
- Position: Striker

Senior career*
| Years | Team | Apps | (Gls) |
| 1979–1993 | Cadets Club | | |

International career
| 1985–1990 | Mauritius | 15 | (8) |
- * Club domestic league appearances and goals

Rajesh Gunesh (born 26 October 1962) is a Mauritian former footballer who played as a striker.

== Playing career ==
Gunesh played for Mauritian side Cadets Club. He was described as a "key figure in the Mauritian football landscape".

== Managing career ==
Gunesh managed Mauritian side Savanne SC. He helped the club to qualify for the CAF Confederation Cup. After that, he managed the Mauritius national football team. He managed the team for the 2004 COSAFA Cup.
