= Orwin Castel =

Mauritian footballer

Personal information
- Full name: Orwin Castel
- Date of birth: 18 June 1973 (age 53)
- Place of birth: Port-Louis Mauritius
- Position: Goalkeeper

Senior career*
Years	Team	Apps	(Gls)
?	Maurice Espoir	?	(0)
?	Sunrise Flacq United	?	(0)
?	Fire Brigade SC	?	(0)
1998	C.D. Maxaquene	31	(0)
1999–2002	Manning Rangers	107	(0)
2002–2005	US Beau-Bassin/Rose Hill	?	(?)
2005–2008	AS de Vacoas-Phoenix	?	(?)
2013–	Langwarrin SC	8	(0)

International career
1996–2006	Mauritius	16	(0)
- * Club domestic league appearances and goals

Orwin Castel (born 18 June 1973) is a Mauritian footballer who plays as a goalkeeper. He won 16 caps for the Mauritius national football team, and had spells with clubs in South Africa and Mozambique during his career. In 2013, he came out of retirement and signed a 1-year deal with Langwarrin SC of the Victorian State League Division 2, in order to help them in their bid for promotion. Unfortunately he didn't sport his trademark mullet in the later stages of his career, however he still had the fans out of their seats with a number of dramatic saves
