= Colin Bell (footballer, born 1979) =

Mauritian footballer

Personal information
- Full name: Peter Donovan Colin Bell
- Date of birth: 17 February 1979 (age 47)
- Place of birth: Poudre d'Or, Mauritius
- Position: Midfielder

Team information
- Current team: Pamplemousses SC
- Number: 17

Senior career*
Years	Team	Apps	(Gls)
1996–2003	Poudre d'Or ATC	261	(39)
2003–2006	Faucon Flacq SC	119	(55)
2006–2018	Pamplemousses SC	204	(24)

International career
2006–2017	Mauritius	41	(0)
- * Club domestic league appearances and goals

Colin Bell (born 17 February 1979 in Poudre d'Or) is a Mauritian footballer who plays for Pamplemousses SC in the Mauritian League and internationally for the Mauritius national football team.

== Career ==
=== Senior career ===
Bell started his professional career with local club Poudre d'Or ATC. In 2003, he moved to Faucon Flacq SC of the Mauritian League. In 2006, he transferred to Pamplemousses SC, also of the Mauritian league. He soon became team captain, and has been an integral part of the team ever since.

=== International career ===
Bell received his first cap for Mauritius in 2006. Since then, he has amassed a total of 20 caps, and has become captain for Club M.
