= Kersley Appou =

Mauritian footballer

Personal information
- Full name: Kersley Hesman Georges Appou
- Date of birth: April 24, 1970 (age 56)
- Place of birth: Mauritius
- Position: Forward

Senior career*
Years	Team	Apps	(Gls)
1997–2001	Pamplemousses SC	-	(-)
2001–2005	AS Port-Louis 2000		(45)
2006	AS Marsouins	5	(2)
2006–2010	Curepipe Starlight SC	–	(–)
2011–2012	PAS Mates	12	(9)
2013–2014	Pamplemousses SC	–	(–)
2015	US Beau-Bassin Rose-Hill	–	(–)

International career
1993–2014	Mauritius	46	(12)
Medal record
Men's football
Representing Mauritius
Indian Ocean Island Games
Gold medal – first place	2003 Mauritius
- * Club domestic league appearances and goals

Kersley Appou (born April 24, 1970) is a former footballer who last played for US Beau-Bassin Rose-Hill in the Mauritian Premier League as a forward. He has also represented Mauritius internationally with Club M. On 13 April 2014, at the age of 43 years and 354 days, Appou became the oldest African to play international football, eclipsing the record set by Cameroonian legend Roger Milla at the 1994 FIFA World Cup.

== Honours ==
Mauritius

- Indian Ocean Island Games: Gold Medalist, 2003
