= Mauritian Cup =

- Founded: 1957
- 2026 Mauritian Cup

The Mauritian Cup is the top knockout tournament of the Mauritian football. It was created in 1957 by the Mauritius Football Association.

== Winners ==
- 1957 : Dodo (Curepipe) 5–2 Fire Brigade (Beau Bassin-Rose Hill)
- 1959 : Faucon Flacq 2–0 Fire Brigade (Beau Bassin-Rose Hill)
- 1960 : Dodo (Curepipe) 1–0 Faucon Flacq
- 1961 : Dodo (Curepipe) 1–1 2–0 Faucon Flacq
- 1962 : Police Club 2–1 Dodo (Curepipe)
- 1963 : Police Club 5–4 Fire Brigade (Beau Bassin-Rose Hill)
- 1964 : no cup
- 1965 : Police Club (Port Louis) 4–2 Muslim Scouts Club (Port Louis)
- 1966 : Dodo (Curepipe) 2–2 3–0 Fire Brigade (Beau Bassin-Rose Hill)
- 1967 : Faucon Flacq bt Police Club (Port Louis)
- 1968 : Police Club (Port Louis)
- 1969 : Muslim Scouts 2–0 Police Club (Port Louis)
- 1970–76 :Not held
- 1977 : Muslim Scouts 1–0 Police Club (Port Louis)
- 1978–79 : Not held
- 1980 : Fire Brigade (Beau Bassin-Rose Hill) 1–0 Police Club (Port Louis)
- 1981 : Fire Brigade (Beau Bassin-Rose Hill) 3–1 Hindu Cadets (Quatre Bornes)
- 1982 : Fire Brigade (Beau Bassin-Rose Hill) 1–0 Police Club (Port Louis)
- 1983 : Fire Brigade (Beau Bassin-Rose Hill) 1–0 Fuel Youth
- 1984 : Police Club (Port Louis)
- 1985 : Sunrise (Flacq)
- 1986 : Fire Brigade (Beau Bassin-Rose Hill)
- 1987 : Sunrise 2–1 Racing
- 1988 : Cadets Club (Quatre Bornes) 1–0 Fuel Youth
- 1989 : Fire Brigade (Beau Bassin-Rose Hill) 5–0 Cadets Club (Quatre Bornes)
- 1990 : Fire Brigade (Beau Bassin-Rose Hill) 7–0 Cadets Club (Quatre Bornes)
- 1991 : Fire Brigade (Beau Bassin-Rose Hill) 1–0 RBBS (or Scouts Club)
- 1992 : Sunrise 2–0 Cadets Club (Quatre Bornes)
- 1993 : Sunrise 2–1 Scouts Club (Port Louis)
- 1994 : Fire Brigade (Beau Bassin-Rose Hill) 3–0 Cadets Club (Quatre Bornes)
- 1995 : Fire Brigade (Beau Bassin-Rose Hill) 2–1 Cadets Club (Quatre Bornes)
- 1996 : Sunrise (Flacq) 2–1 Scouts Club (Port Louis)
- 1997 : Fire Brigade (Beau Bassin-Rose Hill) 3–1 Sunrise (Flacq)
- 1998 : Fire Brigade (Beau Bassin-Rose Hill) 3–0 Scouts Club (Port Louis)
- 1999 : Abandoned
- 2001 : Union Sportive de Beau-Bassin Rose-Hill 2–1 Olympique de Moka
- 2002 : ASPL 2000 3–0 Olympique de Moka
- 2003 : Savanne 1–1 (4–2 pen) ASPL 2000
- 2004 : Savanne 3–2 Faucon Flacq
- 2005 : ASPL 2000 2–0 Pointe-aux-Sables Mates
- 2006 : Curepipe Starlight SC 0–0 (9–8 pen) Savanne
- 2007 : Petite Rivière Noire 2–0 ASPL 2000
- 2008 : Curepipe Starlight SC 4–2 (aet) AS de Vacoas-Phoenix
- 2009 : Pamplemousses 6–1 Etoile de L'Ouest
- 2010 : AS de Vacoas-Phoenix 1–0 Pointe-aux-Sables Mates
- 2011–12: Not known
- 2013: Curepipe Starlight SC 3–2 Petite Rivière Noire
- 2014 : Petite Rivière Noire 3–1 (aet) Pamplemousses
- 2015 : Petite Rivière Noire 2–0 Pamplemousses
- 2016 : Pamplemousses 2–1 Petite Rivière Noire
- 2017 : ASPL 2000 2–0 Pamplemousses
- 2018 : Pamplemousses 2–1 GRSE Wanderers
- 2019 : Roche-Bois Bolton City 2–0 AS de Vacoas-Phoenix
- 2020–21 : Not held due to Covid-19 pandemic
- 2023: GRSE Wanderers 2–1 ASPL 2000
- 2024: Pamplemousses 2–0 ASPL 2000
- 2025: Cercle de Joachim 2–0 Pamplemousses
- 2026: La Cure Waves 2–0 (10–9 pen) ASPL 2000
