= 2018 Mauritian Cup =

Tournament details
- Country: Mauritius

Final positions
- Champions: Pamplemousses
- Runners-up: GRSE Wanderers

The 2018 MFA Cup is the 47th edition of the MFA Cup, the knockout football competition of Mauritius.

== First round ==
[Mar 13]

US BBRH 3-0 Firestars

La Caverne - Swansea

Roche-Bois Dauphins 0-2 Belin SC

St Catherine FC 4-2 GRA Rovers

[Mar 14]

Savanne Galets 2-1 El Classico

Black Rhinos 1-3 La Gaulette Sharks

== Round of 32 ==
[Apr 4]

AS Rivière du Rempart 0-4 Petite Rivière Noire FC

[Apr 5]

Chamarel SC 0-2 Savanne SC

R. du Rempart Star Knitwear 0-7 Pamplemousses SC

[Apr 6]

GRSE Wanderers 2-2 Ent. Boulet Rouge-Riche Mare [GRSE on pen]

St Catherine FC 0-0 CS Jeanne d'Arc [4-2 pen]

[Apr 7]

Grande Rivière Noire WC 0-3 Belin SC

Grand Bel Air Spurs 0-1 Mont Roches Lovelets

US BBRH 2-1 W.B. Albion Barkly

Quatre-Bornes Swansea 0-4 Port Louis Black Horns

Curepipe Starlight 3-5 ASPL 2000

[Apr 9]

Chebel Citicens 1-2 AS Quatre Bornes

PAS Mates 0-3 Roche-Bois Bolton City

[Apr 11]

La Cure Waves 0-0 La Gaulette Sharks [Sharks on pen]

AS Vacoas/Phoenix lt La Cure Sylvester

Upper Vale Starlight bt Savanne Galets

[Apr 13]

US Trou-aux-Biches 2-3 Cercle de Joachim

== Round of 16 ==
[Apr 21]

La Gaulette Sharks 1-3 Roche-Bois Bolton City

Cercle de Joachim 0-2 Petite Rivière Noire FC

Upper Vale Starlight 0-3 ASPL 2000

Belin SC 0-3 Savanne SC

Mont Roche Lovelets 0-10 La Cuire Sylvester

GRSE Wanderers 3-2 St Catherine FC

AS Quatre-Bornes 0-1 US BBRH

Pamplemousses SC 5-0 Port Louis Black Horns

== Quarterfinals ==
[May 8]

Roche-Bois Bolton City 2-0 Petite Rivière Noire FC

Savanne SC 0-2 Pamplemousses SC

ASPL 2000 4-4 GRSE Wanderers [1-3 pen]

La Cure Sylvester 5-0 US BBRH

== Semifinals ==
[May 18]

Pamplemousses SC 2-1 La Cure Sylvester

GRSE Wanderers 1-0 Roche-Bois Bolton City

== Final ==
[May 22]

Pamplemousses SC 2-1 GRSE Wanderers

== See also ==
- 2017–18 Mauritian Premier League
