= 2010 Mauritian Cup final =

The 2010 MFA Cup final took place on 18 December 2010 at the Germain Comarmond stadium in Mauritius. The match was contested by AS de Vacoas-Phoenix and Pointe aux Sables Mates. AS de Vacoas-Phoenix won the final 1-0.

== Match ==
18 December 2010

AS de Vacoas-Phoenix	1 - 0	Pointe aux Sables Mates
Jean-François Nadal 10'

Stade Germain Comarmond, Bambous
Referee: Gunesh Chuttoree

AS de Vacoas-Phoenix	Pointe aux Sables Mates
Ivahn Marie Josée	Kersley Auguste
Marco Dorza (yellow card) 87'	Jason Vythilingum
Jean-Pierre Cerveaux (c)	Kervin Rita (yellow card) 85' (red card) 89'
Kersley Levrai	Thierry François
Jean-Karl Augustin	Joye Estazie (c)
William Gaspard (substituted off) 85'	Julio Milazare (substituted off) 87'
Felix Sai	Hailey Appadoo (substituted off) 54'
Aslam Abdullah (yellow card) 85' (red card) 90'	Rico Shocktorap
Roddy Edwards (yellow card) 81'	Zola Raveloarison
Jean-François Nadal 10' (substituted off) 71'	Rijaitainana (substituted off) 65'
Ben Abdallah	Jean-Reck Ah-Fock
Substitutes:	Substitutes:
Julien Salomon (substituted in) 71'	Rony Raboude (substituted in) 54'
Kevin François (substituted in) 85'	Stevenson Clair (substituted in) 65'
	Jason Mohangee (substituted in) 87'
Coach :	Coach :
Maurice Andriamandranto	Bruno Randrianarivony
