= Jean-Yves André =

Mauritian footballer

Personal information
- Full name: Jean-Yves André
- Date of birth: May 31, 1977 (age 49)
- Place of birth: Mauritius
- Position: Midfielder

Team information
- Current team: Cercle de Joachim

Senior career*
Years	Team	Apps	(Gls)
2001–2009	AS de Vacoas-Phoenix	-	(-)
2009–	Cercle de Joachim		

International career
2008–	Mauritius	1	(0)
- * Club domestic league appearances and goals

Jean-Yves André (born May 31, 1977) is a Mauritian football player who currently plays for Cercle de Joachim in the Mauritian Premier League and for the Mauritius national football team as a midfielder. He is featured on the Mauritian national team in the official 2010 FIFA World Cup video game.
