= Adrien Botlar =

Mauritian footballer

Personal information
- Date of birth: 19 September 1996 (age 30)
- Position: Midfielder

Team information
- Current team: Pamplemousses

Senior career*
| Years | Team | Apps | (Gls) |
| 2014–2019 | AS Port-Louis 2000 | 71 | (38) |
| 2019 | Pamplemousses | 50 | (21) |

International career^{‡}
| 2015– | Mauritius | 31 | (0) |
- * Club domestic league appearances and goals ‡ National team caps and goals as of 20 November 2025

Adrien Botlar (born 19 September 1996) is a Mauritian football midfielder for AS Port-Louis 2000.
