= Prins Tjiueza =

Namibian footballer

Personal information
- Full name: Prins Menelik Tjiueza
- Date of birth: 12 March 2002 (age 24)
- Place of birth: Walvis Bay, Namibia
- Height: 1.71 m (5 ft 7 in)
- Position: Attacking midfielder

Team information
- Current team: Cape Town City
- Number: 21

Youth career
- 2013–2017: Blue Waters

Senior career*
Years	Team	Apps	(Gls)
2017–2022	Blue Waters		
2022–2024	Liria Prizren		
2024–	Cape Town City	21	(2)

International career^{‡}
2021–	Namibia	21	(2)
- * Club domestic league appearances and goals as of 19:00, 20 March 2025 (UTC) ‡ National team caps and goals as of 16:42, 20 March 2025 (UTC)

Prins Menelik Tjiueza (born 12 March 2002) is a Namibian footballer who plays for Cape Town City of the South African Premier Division, and the Namibian national team.

== Club career ==
Tjiueza began playing football at age 4. In 2014 he was named Sportsman of the Year for Immanuel Ruiters School following his performance in the 2014 COSSASA Games held in Zambia. He joined local club Blue Waters F.C. when he was 11 years old. When the team bought the league license for Flamingos F.C. and joined the Namibia Premier League in 2017, Tjiueza made his top-flight debut. Prior to his Premier League debut, he played for the Young United Academy and Spoilers FC of the First Division while with Blue Waters.

In 2019 Tjiueza had a successful trial with Sporting Kansas City of Major League Soccer. However, the deal fell through after multiple teams claimed to have rights to sign him.

In April 2021 he went on trial with an unnamed Turkish club. He played in a training match for the club and assisted on a goal. A few months later, it was announced that he had received his Turkish residency permit and was finalizing a deal with Süper Lig club Alanyaspor.

In August 2022 Tjiueza joined KF Liria Prizren of the First Football League of Kosovo. Over his first five matches with the team he tallied three goals and an assist. He scored in a surprise victory over FC Drita, helping his team advance to the Round of 16 of the 2022–23 Kosovar Cup in November 2022. On 28 April 2023 he scored a hattrick against KF Istogu. The eventual victory for Liria Prizren put the club level with FC Feronikeli 74 at the top of the league table. In March 2023 it was reported that Tjiueza was being strongly pursued by Mamelodi Sundowns of the South African Premier Division. Tjiueza helped Liria Prizren earn promotion to the Football Superleague of Kosovo for the 2023–2024 season.

Tjiueza was a transfer target of Cape Town City FC in February 2024 but was unable to pass his physical following an ankle injury sustained while playing for the national team. When the next transfer window opened in June 2024, Tjiueza was officially unveiled as a new signing for the 2024–25 season.

== International career ==
Tjiueza was spotted by national team coaches at the 2017 and 2018 Skorpion Zinc Tournament in which regional youth sides compete against each other. At the 2018 COSAFA Under-17 Championship Tjiueza was the tournament's top scorer with six goals as the team advanced to the semi-final before ultimately losing to Angola. Namibia defeated Mauritius in the third-Place match with Tjiueza scoring the team's opening goal. Tjiueza then took part in the 2020 COSAFA U-20 Cup which saw Namibia advance to the final before a narrow 0–1 defeat to Mozambique. The result qualified Namibia for the 2021 Africa U-20 Cup of Nations for the first time. In Namibia's opening match of the tournament, Tjiueza was named Man of the Match for his performance against the Central African Republic.

Thanks to his performances in the prior youth championships, Tjiueza earned a call-ups to the senior team in January and March 2021. He made his senior international debut on 28 March 2021 in a 2021 Africa Cup of Nations qualification victory over Guinea. In June 2021 he was named to Namibia's provisional squad by head coach Bobby Samaria for the 2021 COSAFA Cup. He was named as the youngest player on the final roster the following month. In August 2021 Tjiueza was once again the youngest person called up to Namibia's provisional squad for 2022 FIFA World Cup qualification matches against Congo and Togo the following month because of his excellent play in the NPFL.

=== International goals ===
Scores and results list Namibia's goal tally first.

No.	Date	Venue	Opponent	Score	Result	Competition
1.	21 November 2023	Adrar Stadium, Agadir, Morocco	São Tomé and Príncipe	1–0	2–0	2026 FIFA World Cup qualification
2.	20 March 2025	Bingu National Stadium, Lilongwe, Malawi	Malawi	1–0	1–0	2026 FIFA World Cup qualification
Last updated 20 March 2025

=== International career statistics ===
As of match played 20 March 2025.

Namibia national team
Year	Apps	Goals
2021	3	0
2022	1	0
2023	5	1
2024	10	0
2025	1	1
Total	21	2
