= Sewram Gobin =

Mauritian footballer (born 1983)

Personal information
- Full name: Sewram Gobin
- Date of birth: January 19, 1983 (age 43)
- Place of birth: Mauritius
- Position: Forward

Team information
- Current team: AS Rivière du Rempart

Senior career*
Years	Team	Apps	(Gls)
2003–2005	US Bassin Beau/Rose Hill	–	(–)
2005–2007	Savanne SC	–	(–)
2007–2008	Mohun Bagan AC	–	(–)
2009	Pune FC	–	(–)
2011–	AS Rivière du Rempart	–	(14)

International career^{‡}
2006–2013	Mauritius	3	(0)
- * Club domestic league appearances and goals as of October 27, 2011 ‡ National team caps and goals as of February 10, 2011

Sewram Gobin (born January 19, 1983) is a Mauritian footballer who played as a forward for AS Rivière du Rempart in the Mauritian League and the Mauritius national football team.

== Club career ==
Gobin started off his professional career in 2003 with US Bassin Beau/Rose Hill of the Mauritian League. In 2005, he transferred to Savanne SC, also of the Mauritian league. In 2007, after a trial with Mohun Bagan AC of the I-League, he signed with the Indian giants, becoming the team's first Player of Indian Origin (PIO).

Gobin had expressed interest in playing in his ancestral homeland, India. In early 2009, he signed with Pune FC, who at that time was competing in the I-League 2nd Division. He was released later that year. In January 2011, after undergoing a trial back in Mauritius with his former club Savanne SC, Gobin signed with fellow competitor AS Rivière du Rempart.

== International career ==
Gobin earned 2 caps for the national team in 2006. In 2009, he played for Mauritius in a friendly match against Egypt.

== Personal life ==
Gobin's father Ganesh is a former footballer. He has three brothers, Jayram, Kabiraj and Sailesh, all of whom played football in Mauritius.
