= Stéphane Pierre =

Mauritian footballer

Personal information
- Full name: Jean Stéphane Pierre
- Date of birth: 12 October 1981 (age 45)
- Place of birth: Mauritius
- Position: Midfielder

Team information
- Current team: Petite Rivière Noire SC
- Number: 10

Senior career*
Years	Team	Apps	(Gls)
2006–	Petite Rivière Noire SC	–	(–)

International career^{‡}
2007–	Mauritius	5	(3)
- * Club domestic league appearances and goals as of 22 July 2013 ‡ National team caps and goals as of 22 July 2013

Stéphane Pierre (born 12 October 1981) is a Mauritian footballer who plays as a midfielder for Petite Rivière Noire SC in the Mauritian League and the Mauritius national football team.

== Career ==
Pierre has spent his entire career playing for Petite Rivière Noire SC in the Mauritian League, beginning in 2006. He won the Mauritian Cup with PRNSC in 2007.

== International career ==
Pierre received his first cap for Mauritius in the 2007 COSAFA Cup against South Africa as a halftime substitute. He made his return to international football in a 2014 CHAN qualifier for Mauritius against Comoros in 2012, at the age of 31. During the 2013 COSAFA Cup, Pierre scored 3 goals for Mauritius to finish as the 2nd top scorer in the tournament.
