= Jean-Sébastien Bax =

French-Mauritian footballer (born 1972)

Personal information
- Full name: Jean-Sébastien Bax
- Date of birth: October 5, 1972 (age 54)
- Place of birth: Marseille, France
- Height: 1.94 m (6 ft 4 in)
- Positions: Defensive midfielder; defender

Senior career*
Years	Team	Apps	(Gls)
1994–1997	Fire Brigade SC	71	(28)
1997–1999	AS Marsouins	72	(21)
2000–2008	Engen Santos	133	(12)

International career
1994–2006	Mauritius	36	(5)
- * Club domestic league appearances and goals

Jean-Sébastien Bax (born October 5, 1972) is a retired French-Mauritian footballer.

He played mainly as a defensive midfielder and a defender. Over the years, he played for Fire Brigade SC in Mauritius, AS Marsouins in Réunion, and Engen Santos in South Africa. He also represented Mauritius in international play, making 36 appearances and scoring 5 goals.
