= AS Quatre Bornes =

Mauritian football club

- Full name: Association Sportive Quatre Bornes
- Ground: Stade Sir Guy Rozemont
- Capacity: 1,000
- League: National Division 2
- 2025–26: 4th

Association Sportive Quatre Bornes is a Mauritian football club based in Quatre Bornes, Plaines Wilhems District. In 2017–18, they played in the Mauritian League.

== Ground ==
Their home stadium is Stade Sir Guy Rozemont in Quatre Bornes.

== See also ==
- Mauritius Football Association
- List of football clubs in Mauritius
