= Mauritian Premier League =

- Founded: 1935; 91 years ago
- Country: Mauritius
- Confederation: CAF
- Number of clubs: 10
- Level on pyramid: 1
- Relegation to: Mauritian National Division One
- Domestic cup(s): MFA Cup; Republic Cup
- International cup(s): Champions League; Confederation Cup
- Current champions: La Cure Waves (1) (2025–26)
- Most championships: Fire Brigade (13); Dodo (13)
- Top scorer: Ashley Nazira (76 goals)
- Broadcaster: Mauritius Broadcasting Corporation
- Website: mauritiusfa.mu
- Current: 2026–27 Mauritian National Super League

The Mauritian Premier League is the top division of football in Mauritius. The 10-team league has been governed by the Mauritius Football Association since its establishment in 1935. League games usually take place in front of dozens of spectators.

== Premier League 2025–26 Clubs ==
- ASPL 2000
- AS Vacoas-Phoenix
- Cercle de Joachim
- Chebel Citizens
- Rivière du Rempart
- Beau Bassin-Rose Hill
- Pamplemousses
- PAS Mates
- Petite Rivière Noire
- La Cure Waves

== Stadiums ==
=== 2024–25 stadiums ===
Port Louis	Curepipe	Belle Vue Maurel	Central Flacq	Quatre Bornes	Mahébourg	Bambous	Beau Bassin-Rose Hill	Curepipe	Saint Pierre
St. François Xavier Stadium	Stade George V	Stade Anjalay	Stade Auguste Vollaire	Stade Sir Guy Rozemont	Stade Harry Latour	Germain Comarmond Stadium	Sir Gaëtan Duval Stadium	Sir Winston Churchill Stadium (Vélodrome)	Stade de Cote d'Or
Capacity: 2,500	Capacity: 6,200	Capacity: 16,000	Capacity: 4,000	Capacity: 1,000	Capacity: 2,000	Capacity: 5,000	Capacity: 6,500	Capacity: 2,000	Capacity: 5,000

== Previous winners ==
Years	Champions
1935	Curepipe (1)
1936	Garrison (1)
1937	Garrison (2)
1938	Dodo (1)
1939	Dodo (2)
1940	Not held
1941	Not held
1942	Fire Brigade (1)
1943	Not held
1944	Dodo (3)
1945	Dodo (4)
1946	Dodo (5)
1947	Collège St. Esprit (1)
1948	Dodo (6)
1949	Faucons (1)
1950	Fire Brigade (2)
1951	Dodo (7)
1952	Not held
1953	Dodo (8)
1954	Faucons (2)
1955	Faucons (3)
1956	Not held
1957	Dodo (9); Faucons (4)
1958	Faucons (5)
1959	Dodo (10)
1960	Not held
1961	Fire Brigade (3)
1962	Police Club (1)
1963	Racing Club (1)
1964	Dodo (11)
1965	Police Club (2)
1966	Dodo (12)
1967	Police Club (3)
1968	Dodo (13)
1969	Not held
1970	Not held
1971	Police Club (4)
1972	Police Club (5)
1973	Fire Brigade (4)
1974	Fire Brigade (5)
1975	Hindu Cadets (1)
1976	Muslim Scouts Club (1)
1976–77	Hindu Cadets (2)
1977–78	Racing Club (2)
1978–79	Hindu Cadets (3)
1979–80	Fire Brigade (6)
1980–81	Police Club (6)
1981–82	Police Club (7)
1982–83	Fire Brigade (7)
1983–84	Fire Brigade (8)
1984–85	Fire Brigade (9)
1985–86	Hindu Cadets (4)
1986–87	Sunrise Flacq United (1)
1987–88	Fire Brigade (10)
1988–89	Sunrise Flacq United (2)
1989–90	Sunrise Flacq United (3)
1990–91	Sunrise Flacq United (4)
1991–92	Sunrise Flacq United (5)
1992–93	Fire Brigade (11)
1993–94	Fire Brigade (12)
1994–95	Sunrise Flacq United (6)
1995–96	Sunrise Flacq United (7)
1996–97	Sunrise Flacq United (8)
1997–98	Muslim Scouts Club (2)
1998–99	Fire Brigade (13)
2000	Not held
2001	Olympique de Moka (1)
2002	ASPL 2000 (1)
2003	ASPL 2000 (2)
2003–04	ASPL 2000 (3)
2004–05	ASPL 2000 (4)
2005–06	Pamplemousses (1)
2006–07	Curepipe Starlight (1)
2007–08	Curepipe Starlight (2)
2008–09	Curepipe Starlight (3)
2010	Pamplemousses (2)
2011	ASPL 2000 (5)
2011–12	Pamplemousses (3)
2012–13	Curepipe Starlight (4)
2013–14	Cercle de Joachim (1)
2014–15	Cercle de Joachim (2)
2015–16	ASPL 2000 (6)
2016–17	Pamplemousses (4)
2017–18	Pamplemousses (5)
2018–19	Pamplemousses (6)
2019–20	Not finished due to COVID-19
2020–21	Not finished due to COVID-19
2021–22	Not held
2022–23	GRSE Wanderers (1)
2023–24	Cercle de Joachim (3)
2024–25	Cercle de Joachim (4)
2025–26	La Cure Waves (1)

== Performance by club ==
Club	City	Titles	Last title
Fire Brigade	Beau Bassin-Rose Hill	13	1998–99
Dodo	Curepipe	13	1968
Sunrise	Flacq	8	1996–97
Police Club	Port-Louis	7	1981–82
Pamplemousses	Pamplemousses	6	2018–19
ASPL 2000	Port-Louis	6	2015–16
Faucon Flacq	Flacq	5	1958
Cadets Club (includes Hindu Cadets)	Quatre Bornes	4	1985–86
Curepipe Starlight	Curepipe	4	2012–13
Cercle de Joachim	Curepipe	4	2024–25
Garrison		2	1937
Racing Club	Quatre Bornes	2	1977–78
Scouts Club (includes Muslim Scouts Club)	Port-Louis	2	1997–98
Collège du Saint-Esprit	Quatre Bornes	1	1947
Curepipe	Curepipe	1	1935
Olympique de Moka	Moka	1	2000–01
GRSE Wanderers	Flacq	1	2022–23
La Cure Waves	Port-Louis	1	2025–26

== Top goalscorers ==
Season	Goalscorer	Team	Goals
1992–93	(Mauritius) Asley Mocúde	Sunrise Flacq	28
1996–97	(Mauritius) Asley Mocúde	Sunrise Flacq	31
2001	(Mauritius) Jerry Louis	Olympique de Moka	30
2002	(Mauritius) Karl Léonnie	Faucon Flacq	18
2002	(Mauritius) Kersley Appou	Port-Louis 2000	18
2002	(Mauritius) Tony François	Beau Bassin-Rose Hill	18
2003	(Mauritius) Kersley Appou	Port-Louis 2000	11
2003	(Mauritius) Tony François	Beau Bassin-Rose Hill	11
2003–04	(Madagascar) Praxis Rabemananjara	Pamplemousses	17
2004–05	(Madagascar) Praxis Rabemananjara	Pamplemousses	12
2005–06	(Madagascar) Praxis Rabemananjara	Pamplemousses	11
2006–07	(Madagascar) Praxis Rabemananjara	Pamplemousses	19
2007–08	(Mauritius) Wesley Marquette	Curepipe Starlight	14
2008–09	(Mauritius) Tony François	Rivière du Rempart	17
2010	(Mauritius) Gurty Calambé	Etoile de l'Ouest	22
2011	(Ghana) Ben Abdallah	Vacoas-Phoenix	16
2012	(Mauritius) Sewram Gobin	Rivière du Rempart	14
2012	(Madagascar) Branli Zizi Ratovonirina	Pamplemousses	14
2014-15	(Mauritius) Ashley Nazira	Entente Boulet Rouge	18
2015–16	(Madagascar) Branli Zizi Ratovonirina		25
2016–17	(Mauritius) Stéphane Pierre	Petite Rivière Noire	21
2017-18	(Mauritius) Adrien Botlar	Port-Louis 2000	13
2018–19	(Mauritius) Ashley Nazira	Entente Boulet Rouge	21
2020-21	(Mauritius) Ashley Nazira	Entente Boulet Rouge	14
2022–23	(Mauritius) Mountala N'dam	Port-Louis 2000	13
2023–24	(Mauritius) Aurelien Francois	Cercle de Joachim	16
2024-25	(Mauritius) Giano Li Tien Kee	La Cure Wave	13
2025-26	(Mauritius) Ashley Nazira	Pamplemousses	13

Most time goalscorers

- 4 times each.
  - (Madagascar) Praxis Rabemananjara (2003–04, 2004–05, 2005–06 and 2006–07)
  - (Mauritius) Ashley Nazira (2014-15, 2018-19, 2020-21 and 2025-26).

Most goals by a player in a single season

- 30 goals.
  - (Mauritius) Jerry Louis (2001)

== Multiple hat-tricks ==
Rank	Country	Player	Hat-tricks
1	(Mauritius)	Ben Abdallah	3
1	(Mauritius)	Ashley Nazira	3
1	(Mauritius)	Andy Sophie	3
4	(Mauritius)	Mikael Badul	2
4	(Mauritius)	Wesley Marquette	2
4	(Mauritius)	Mohamed Ndam	2
4	(Madagascar)	Francis Rasolofonirina	2
8	(Mauritius)	Jean-Reck Ah Fok	1
8	(Mauritius)	James Andre	1
8	(Mauritius)	Stéphane Arthée	1
8	(Mauritius)	Adrien Botlar	1
8	(Mauritius)	Gurty Calambé	1
8	(Mauritius)	William Gaspard	1
8	(Mauritius)	Stevenson Hollingsworth	1
8	(Mauritius)	Westley Labourcherie	1
8	(Mauritius)	Fiston Lema	1
8	(Mauritius)	Joseph Mwansa	1
8	(Mauritius)	Fabrice Pithia	1
8	(Madagascar)	Praxis Rabemananjara	1
8	(Madagascar)	Pamphilato Rajaonainanabalo	1
8	(Mauritius)	Guillaume Sockalingum	1
8	(Mauritius)	Rodson Tojosoa	1

== See also ==
- List of football clubs in Mauritius
