= Sir Gaëtan Duval Stadium =

Multi-use stadium in Mauritius

- Interactive map of Sir Gaëtan Duval Stadium
- Former names: Rose Hill Stadium
- Location: Beau Bassin-Rose Hill; Mauritius
- Coordinates: 20°14′23″S 57°28′18″E
- Capacity: 6,500
- Surface: Grass

Construction
- Opened: 1972

Tenant
- US Beau Bassin-Rose Hill

Sir Gaëtan Duval Stadium is a multi-use stadium in Beau Bassin-Rose Hill, Plaines Wilhems District, Mauritius. It is currently used mostly for football matches and is the home stadium of US Beau Bassin-Rose Hill. The stadium can accommodate 6,500 spectators.
