= Bambous Etoile de L'ouest SC =

Bambous Etoile de L'ouest S.C
- Full name: Bambous Etoile de L'ouest Sports Club
- Ground: Stade Germain Comarmond
- Capacity: 5,000
- League: Mauritian League

Bambous Etoile de L'ouest Sports Club is a Mauritian football club based in Bambous, Rivière Noire District. In 2012, they played in the National Division of the Mauritian League, the second division in Mauritian football.

== Ground ==
Their home stadium is Stade Germain Comarmond (cap. 5,000) in Bambous, in the Rivière Noire District.

== See also ==
- Mauritius Football Association
- List of football clubs in Mauritius
