= Sébastien Monier =

French-Mauritian footballer (born 1984)

Personal information
- Full name: Sébastien Monier
- Date of birth: 15 June 1984 (age 42)
- Place of birth: Lomme, France
- Height: 1.78 m (5 ft 10 in)
- Position: Midfielder

Team information
- Current team: Royal Mouscron-Péruwelz
- Number: 7

Youth career
- 1997–1999: Centre de Préformation de Liévin
- 1999–2004: AJ Auxerre

Senior career*
Years	Team	Apps	(Gls)
2004–2007	SR Delémont	–	(–)
2007–2008	Ethnikos Piraeus F.C.	–	(–)
2008–2009	SR Delémont	–	(–)
2010–2011	US Pont-de-Roide	–	(–)
2011–	Royal Mouscron-Péruwelz	–	(–)
- * Club domestic league appearances and goals as of 27 August 2011

Sébastien Monier (born 15 June 1984) is a French-born footballer of Mauritian descent who currently plays for Royal Mouscron-Péruwelz in the Belgian Third Division.

== Career ==
Monier began training as a youth at the Centre de Préformation in Liévin in 1997. Two years later, he moved to AJ Auxerre, playing for their various youth teams. During his time there, he did not make an appearance for the senior side. After 5 seasons, he decided to go a different route, signing with SR Delémont in Switzerland. 3 seasons later he moved to Ethnikos Piraeus F.C. in Greece. After only one season, he moved back to SR Delémont. In 2010, he signed with US Pont-de-Roide in the French CFA 2. One year later he moved again, joining Belgian side Royal Mouscron-Péruwelz of the Belgian Third Division.

== International ==
Monier has not yet played for a national team, but has expressed his interest in playing for the Mauritius national football team, being eligible through his mother, who was born in Mauritius.
