= Arsenal Wanderers =

- Full name: Arsenal Wanderers
- Founded: 1885
- Ground: Stade Anjalay; Belle Vue, Mauritius
- Capacity: 16,000
- League: Pamplemousses Regional League

Arsenal Wanderers is a Mauritian football club founded in 1885 based in Arsenal village. They play in the Pamplemousses Regional League in Mauritian football. They play their home games at Stade Anjalay, a stadium that can accommodate 16,000 spectators.
