= Chamarel FC =

Mauritian football club

Chamarel
- Full name: Chamarel FC
- Ground: Stade Germain Comarmond; Bambous,
- Capacity: 5,000
- League: Mauritian Second Division

Chamarel FC is a Mauritian football club based in Bambous. They play in the Mauritian League, the top division of Mauritian football.

== History ==
It was founded in the town of Bambous and has spent most of its history in the regional leagues of Mauritius.

Their main achievement so far has been winning the Division 1 title in the 2012/13 season to gain promotion to the Mauritius Premier League for the first time in their history.

== Stadium ==
Their home stadium is Stade Germain Comarmond (cap. 5,000), located in Bambous, in the Rivière Noire District.
