= Jerry Louis =

Mauritian footballer

Personal information
- Full name: Jerry Louis
- Date of birth: 12 February 1978 (age 48)
- Place of birth: Mauritius
- Height: 6 ft 0 in (1.83 m)
- Position: Midfielder

Team information
- Current team: Trois Bassins FC

Senior career*
| Years | Team | Apps | (Gls) |
| 1999–2003 | Olympique Moka | | (30) |
| 2003–2007 | Saint-Denis FC | - | (-) |
| 2007–2009 | Curepipe Starlight SC | - | (-) |
| 2009–2011 | SS Capricorne | - | (-) |
| 2011–2012 | FC Avirons | - | (-) |
| 2013– | Trois Bassins FC | - | (-) |

International career
| 1999–2011 | Mauritius | 49 | (4) |
- * Club domestic league appearances and goals

Jerry Louis (born 12 February 1978) is a Mauritian former footballer who last played for Trois Bassins FC in Réunion as a midfielder. He has represented the Mauritius national football team from 1999 to 2011.
