= Cadets Club =

Mauritian football club

- Full name: Cadets Club
- Ground: Stade Sir Guy Rozemont; Quatre Bornes,
- League: Championnat de Maurice D3

Cadets Club is a Mauritian football club based in Quatre Bornes. They play in the Championnat de Maurice D2.

In 1986 the team won the Mauritian League.

== Stadium ==
Their home stadium is Stade Sir Guy Rozemont in Quatre Bornes.

== Honours ==
- Mauritian League
  - Champions (4): 1975, 1977, 1979, 1986
