= Grande Rivière Sud-Est Wanderers SC =

Football club in Flacq, Mauritius

GRSE Wanderers
- Full name: Grande Rivière Sud-Est Wanderers Sporting Club
- Nickname: Les Rastas
- Chairman: Faren Boodhun
- Manager: Jones Bissessur
- League: Mauritian Premier League
- 2025-26: 2nd, National Division

Grande Rivière Sud-Est Wanderers Sporting Club, commonly known as the GRSE Wanderers, is a Mauritian professional football club that plays in the Mauritian Premier League, the top division of the Mauritian football system. It is based in the Flacq district of the country.

In the 2022-23 season, the club won the league for the first time, securing the title on the 17th matchday after beating AS Vacoas-Phoenix 1-0. They completed a domestic double after also winning the Mauritius Cup 2-1 against AS Port-Louis 2000.

== Honours ==
Mauritian Premier League: 1

- Champion: 2022-23

Mauritius Cup: 1

- Champion: 2022-23
- Runner-up: 2018
