= Roche-Bois Bolton City YC =

Bolton
- Full name: Bolton City Youth Club
- Nickname: Roche Bois Bolton City
- Founded: 1978
- Ground: New George V Stadium, Curepipe, Plaines Wilhems District
- Capacity: 6,200
- Chairman: Rajesh Bhagat
- Manager: Dennis Charpentier
- League: Mauritian Premier League
- 2025–26: 1st in National Division 1
Home colours	Away colours

Bolton City Youth Club, also known as Roche-Bois Bolton City, is a Mauritian football club based in Port Louis. The club was founded in 1978. They play in the Mauritian League, the top division of Mauritian football.

== Stadium ==
Their home stadium is Stade George V (cap. 6,200), located in Curepipe.

== Honours ==
- Trophee de la Jeunesse

winner: 1992

- Port-Louis Regional First Division

winner: 2006

- National Second Division

winner: 2011

- National First Division

winner: 2012
