= Stade Harry Latour =

Multi-use stadium in Mahébourg, Mauritius

- Location: Mahébourg; Mauritius
- Capacity: 2,000
- Surface: Grass

Construction
- Opened: 21 December 1989
- Renovated: 2003

Tenant
- Savanne SC

Stade Harry Latour is a multi-use stadium in Mahébourg, Grand Port District, Mauritius. It is currently used mostly for staging football matches and is the home stadium of Savanne SC. The stadium can accommodate 2,000 spectators.
