= St. François Xavier Stadium =

- Interactive map of St. François Xavier Stadium
- Location: Port Louis; Mauritius
- Coordinates: 20°09′14″S 57°30′53″E
- Capacity: 2,500
- Surface: Artificial grass

Construction
- Opened: 5 April 2009
- Renovated: 2013

Tenant
- AS Port-Louis 2000

St. François Xavier Stadium is a multi-use stadium in Port Louis, Port Louis District, Mauritius. It is currently used mostly for staging football matches and is the home stadium of AS Port-Louis 2000. The stadium holds 2,500 people.
