= Centre de Flacq =

Centre de Flacq Central Flacq
- Village
- Location within Mauritius
- Coordinates: 20°12′0.72″S 57°43′3.57″E
- Country: Mauritius
- Districts: Flacq District

Government

Population (2011)
  - Total: 15,791
  - Density: 779/km^{2} (2,020/sq mi)
- Time zone: UTC+4 (MUT)
- Area code: 230
- ISO 3166 code: MU
- Climate: Am

Centre de Flacq or Central Flacq is the metropolitan area of Flacq District, located in the center of the district. The village is one of the most developed and popular villages in Mauritius. Home to several commercial and public institutions, the village topped the list of the most developed villages in Flacq District. The village is administered by the Centre de Flacq Village Council under the aegis of the Flacq District Council. According to the census conducted by Statistics Mauritius in 2011, the population was 15,791. The main source of transportation are taxi and bus service and English was registered as its official language and is highly exercised for notifications and advertisements.

== Sports ==
The local football team is the Faucon Flacq SC, their home stadium is the Stade Auguste Vollaire.

== See also ==
- Districts of Mauritius
- List of places in Mauritius
