= US Beau Bassin-Rose Hill =

Union Sportive de Beau Bassin-Rose Hill
- Full name: Union Sportive de Beau Bassin-Rose Hill
- Nickname: USBBRH
- Founded: 2000
- Ground: Stade Sir Gaëtan Duval
- Capacity: 6,500
- President: Michael Cangy
- Manager: Shakeel Goburdhun
- Coach: Roland Espiegle
- League: Mauritian League

Union Sportive de Beau Bassin-Rose Hill is a Mauritian football club based in the town of Beau Bassin-Rose Hill, Plaines Wilhems District.

The club also includes a women's football team, men's and women's handball teams and a women's volleyball team.

== Ground ==
Their home stadium is Stade Sir Gaëtan Duval (cap. 6,500) in Beau Bassin-Rose Hill, Plaines Wilhems District.

== Season 2012–19 ==
During the 2012/13 season, USBBRH won promotion to the National First Division, second tier of the Mauritian League after finishing second to La Cure Sylvester in the National Second Division. USBBRH was relegated back to the National Second Division at the end of the 2015/16 season. After narrowly missing out on promotion during the 2016/17 and 2017/18 seasons, USBBRH won The National Division Two and was promoted back to the National Division One.

== Season to season ==
Season	Tier	Division	Rank
2012–13	3rd	National 2	2nd
2013–14	2nd	National 1	6th
2014–15	2nd	National 1	4th
2015–16	2nd	National 1	8th
2016–17	3rd	National 2	4th
2017–18	3rd	National 2	3rd
2018–19	3rd	National 2	1st

== Achievements ==
- Mauritian Cup: 1

2001

- Mauritian Republic Cup: 1

2002

- National Division Two: 1

2018-19

== See also ==
- Mauritius Football Association
- List of football clubs in Mauritius
