= Stade Auguste Vollaire =

Stadium in Centre de Flacq, Mauritius

- Interactive map of Stade Auguste Vollaire
- Location: Centre de Flacq; Mauritius
- Coordinates: 20°11′15″S 57°43′31″E
- Capacity: 4,000
- Surface: Grass

Construction
- Opened: 25 May 1991
- Renovated: 2003

Tenant
- Faucon Flacq SC

Stade Auguste Vollaire is a multi-use stadium in Centre de Flacq, Flacq District, Mauritius. It is currently used mostly for staging football matches and is the home stadium of Faucon Flacq SC. The stadium holds 4,000 people.

== History ==
For first time, the final of the 2019 Indian Ocean Island Games was played here, pitting the hosts Mauritius against Réunion.
