= Fire Brigade SC =

Association football club in Mauritius

- Full name: Fire Brigade SC
- Nickname: Les rouges et noirs
- Founded: 1950; 76 years ago
- Dissolved: 2000; 26 years ago
Home colours

Fire Brigade SC is the most successful football club in Mauritius with 13 league titles, 12 Mauritian cups and 3 Republic cups. There has been great rivalry between Sunrise Flacq United and Fire Brigade SC. Both clubs have met each other four times in the Republic Cup finals, with Sunrise Flacq United winning on all four occasions.

== Honours ==
- Mauritian League: 13
  - 1942, 1950, 1961, 1973, 1974, 1979–80, 1982–83, 1983–84, 1984–85, 1987–88, 1992–93, 1993–94, 1998–99
- Mauritian Cup: 12
  - 1980, 1981, 1982, 1983, 1986, 1989, 1990, 1991, 1994, 1995, 1997, 1998
- Mauritian Republic Cup: 3
  - 1991, 1995, 1999
