= Olympique de Moka =

- Full name: Olympique de Moka
- Founded: 2000
- Ground: Maryse Justin Stadium; Moka,
- Capacity: 3,000
- League: Championnat de Maurice D3

Olympique de Moka is a Mauritian football club based in Moka. They play in the Championnat de Maurice D3.

In 2001 the team won the Mauritian League.

== Stadium ==
Their home stadium is Maryse Justin Stadium (cap. 3,000), located in Moka.

== Honours ==
- Mauritian League:2001
