= Pointe-aux-Sables Mates =

Pointe aux Sables Mates
- Full name: Pointe aux Sables Mates
- Ground: Sir Gaetan Duval Stadium; Beau-Bassin Rose-Hill, Plaines Wilhems District
- Capacity: 7,000
- Chairman: Dharma Vikash Singh
- Manager: Derrick Lepelissier
- League: Mauritian Second Division
- 2025–26: 10th, Premier League

Pointe aux Sables Mates is a Mauritian football club based in Port Louis. They play in the Mauritian Second Division, the second division in Mauritian football.

The club won the 2004–05 Second Division and finished runners-up in the cup. In 2014, the club received promotion back to the Mauritian top flight.

PAS Mates played in the 2006 CAF Confederation Cup, losing 4–0 on aggregate to ZESCO United of Zambia.

== Stadium ==
Their home stadium is Sir Gaetan Duval Stadium (cap. 7,000), located in Beau-Bassin Rose-Hill in Plaines Wilhems District.

== Honours ==
- Mauritian Second Division: 2004–2005, 2014–2015

== Performance in CAF competitions ==
- 2006 CAF Confederation Cup: first round
