= Mauritius Football Association =

Governing body of association football in Mauritius

CAF
- Short name: MFA
- Founded: 1952
- Headquarters: Plaines Wilhems District
- FIFA affiliation: 1964
- CAF affiliation: 1965
- President: Samir Sobha
- Website: mauritiusfa.mu

The Mauritius Football Association (MFA) is the governing body of football in Mauritius. It was founded in 1952, affiliated to FIFA in 1964 and to CAF in 1965. The association was formerly known as the Mauritius Sports Association but renamed to Mauritius Football Association in 1984 through the introduction of a Sports Act by the government. The founding members of the association were FC Dodo, Faucon Flacq SC (now renamed Flacq SC), CSC, Hounds, Royal College of Curepipe, and Saint Joseph College, all of which were based in Curepipe and, with the exception of Flacq SC, have since ceased to exist. The Mauritius Football Association organizes the national football league and the national team.

== Problems faced by the MFA ==
The association has undergone numerous upheavals over the years, its troubles ranging from perpetual financial shortages to constant changes of presidents, and has been criticized by various quarters for failing to stem the decline of football in Mauritius. Although football continues to be the most popular sport in the country, the majority of domestic league matches attract very few spectators (sometimes less than a handful), earning the clubs and the MFA very little income and leaving the players without the motivation to showcase their skills. The focus of the sport's popularity has instead almost completely shifted to the English Premier League, which is considered far more exciting due to the high quality of football on display and the presence of numerous world-famous stars. National and International television networks beam Premier League matches into the living rooms multiple times every week, adding to the erosion of interest in local football.

The decline in popularity of domestic football is also attributed to the Mauritian Premier League's major restructuring prior to the 2000/2001 season. The restructuring was aimed at preventing the recurrence of the violent riots that rocked the country during the final match, the championship decider, of the Mauritian League season on 23 May 1999 between Fire Brigade Sports Club (now renamed as Pamplemousses SC) and Scouts Club (renamed as Port Louis Sporting Club). A controversial penalty awarded to Fire Brigade SC, a Creole club, ensured their win over the Muslim-supported Scouts Club, leading to 1999 L'Amicale riots which lasted for 3 days and killed 7 people. The events shook the nation and led to the government imposing an 18-month ban on all footballing activities in the country, with only the national team permitted to play during this period. The restructure, which was an effort to de-ethnicize local clubs, required the "regionalization" of clubs, with teams now being formed on the basis of region instead of ethnicity or religion. Although the move achieved the desired results in terms of reduction in violent conflicts, it also removed the traditional rivalry among fans, resulting in loss of interest and support. In fact, many locals believe that the resurrection of Mauritian football lies in permitting the formation of clubs on the basis of ethnicity or religion.

In May 2013, Mauritius Football Association President Dinnanathlall Persunnoo was accused of match fixing.

In August 2021, police launched an investigation after a recording device was found in the women's toilets at the Mauritius FA headquarters. Later that month, two board members stepped down over the MFA's handling of the accusations.
