= Entente Boulet Rouge SC =

- Full name: Entente Boulet Rouge-Riche Mare Rovers
- Ground: Stade Auguste Vollaire; Central Flacq,
- Capacity: 4,000
- Chairman: Sanjay Kamal Pradesh
- Manager: Gérald Fabricienne
- League: National Division 1
- 2025–26: 6th

Entente Boulet Rouge-Riche Mare Rovers, commonly known as Entente Boulet Rouge SC, is a Mauritian football club based in Central Flacq. They play in the Mauritian League, the top division of Mauritian football.

== Stadium ==
Their home stadium is Stade Auguste Vollaire (cap. 4,000), located in Central Flacq.
