= Belle Vue Harel =

- Village
- Location within Mauritius
- Coordinates: 20°03′57″S 57°35′39″E
- Country: Mauritius
- Time zone: UTC+4 (MUT)

Belle Vue Harel is a village in Mauritius that is located in the Pamplemousses District in the northern part of the island. It is located next to Plaine des Papayes village. It is part of the larger Plaine des Papayes area which as of 2011 had 7,607 inhabitants.

The village is the site of the Stade Anjalay, which is a prominent football venue for the nation, with the national football team and two top division teams (Pamplemousses SC, AS Rivière du Rempart) being resident. Athletics is also accommodated at the stadium and the 1992 African Championships in Athletics was held in the village.

== History ==
Significant strikes by Indo Mauritian sugarcane field labourers escalated into deadly riots in the fields of the Belle Vue Harel Sugar Estate on 27 September 1943 during World War II. This event became known as the Belle Vue Harel massacre.
