= Faucon Flacq SC =

- Full name: Faucon Flacq Sports Club
- Founded: 1945
- Ground: Stade Auguste Vollaire
- Capacity: 4,000
- Chairman: Bhurdwaz Mungur
- Manager: Jasmin Walter
- League: Mauritian Regional League
- 2017 (League D3): 10th

Faucon Flacq Sports Club is a Mauritian football club based in Centre de Flacq, Flacq District, situated in the east of the island. In 2017, they played in the Mauritian Regional League.

== Ground ==
Their home stadium is Stade Auguste Vollaire, located in Centre de Flacq, Flacq.

== Achievements ==
- Mauritian League: 5
  - 1949, 1954, 1955, 1957, 1958
- Mauritian Cup: 2
  - 1959, 1967
- Mauritian Republic Cup: 1
  - 2003

== Performance in CAF competitions ==
- CAF Champions League: 1 appearance

1991 – Semi-finals
1997 – First Round

== See also ==
- Mauritius Football Association
- List of football clubs in Mauritius
