= Savanne SC =

- Full name: Savanne Sporting Club
- Founded: 2000
- Ground: Stade Harry Latour; Mahébourg, Grand Port District
- Capacity: 2,000
- Chairman: Rajen Armoogum
- Manager: Prakash Parmanund
- League: National Division 2
- 2025–26: 6th
Home colours	Away colours

Savanne SC is a Mauritian football club based in Souillac, Savanne. They play in the Barclays League, the top division of Mauritian football.

They have never won the league, but have won the Mauritian Cup twice, in 2003 and 2004. They have also won the Mauritian Republic Cup once, in 2009.

== Ground ==
Their home stadium is Stade Harry Latour (cap. 2,000) in Mahébourg, Grand Port District.

== Achievements ==
- Mauritian Cup: 2

2003, 2004

- Mauritian Republic Cup: 1

2009

== Performance in CAF competitions ==
- CAF Confederation Cup: 1 appearance

2005 – Preliminary Round
