= George V Stadium =

Stadium in Curepipe, Mauritius

Stade George V
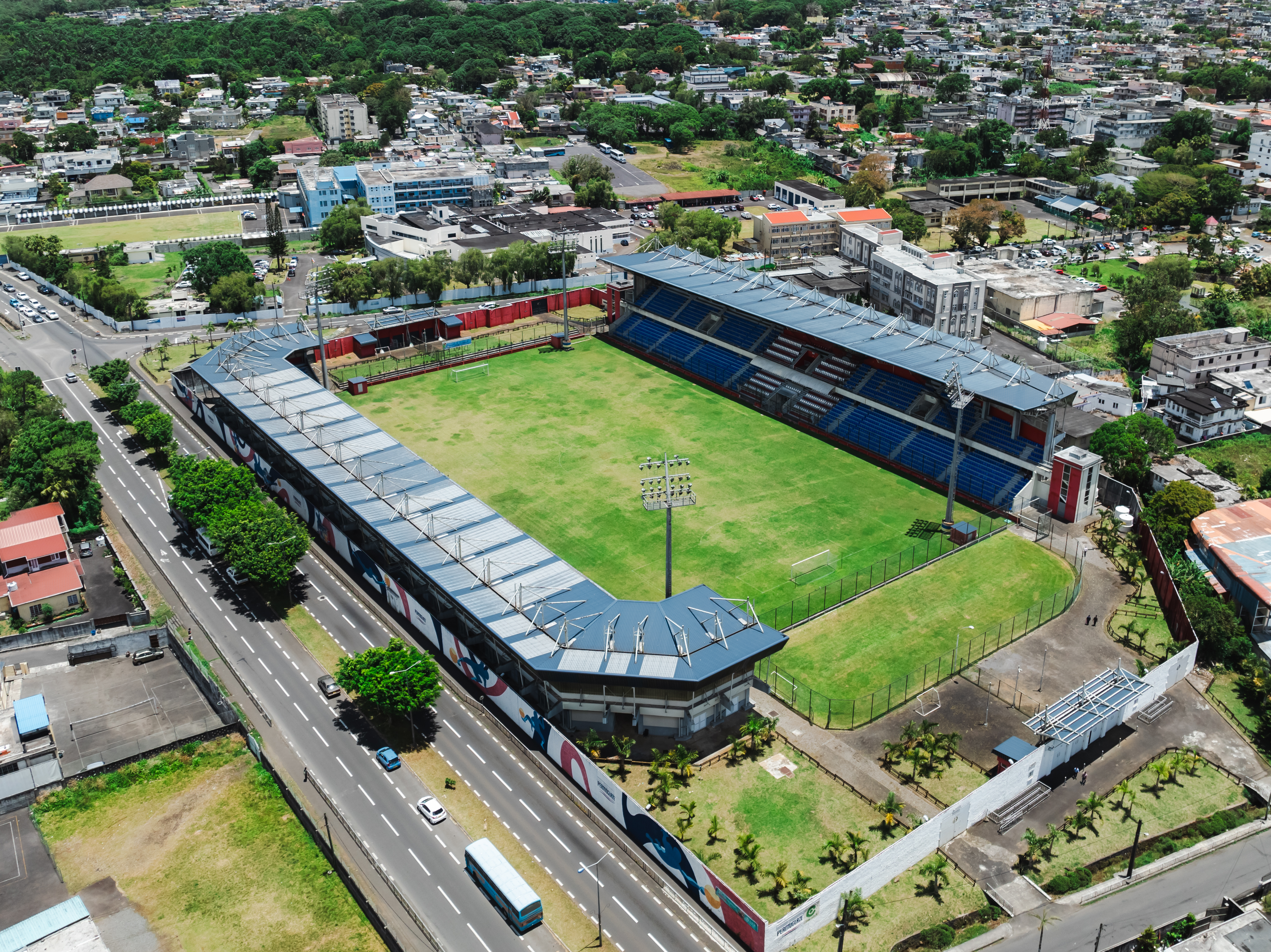
- Interactive map of Stade George V
- Former names: George V Stadium
- Location: Barry Road; Curepipe; Mauritius
- Coordinates: 20°19′16.56″S 57°31′46.74″E
- Capacity: 6,500
- Surface: Grass

Construction
- Groundbreaking: 1954
- Opened: 1955
- Renovated: 9 August 2003
- Cost: Rs 135 million

Tenants
- Mauritius national football team, Curepipe Starlight SC, AS de Vacoas-Phoenix

Stade George V is a football stadium in Curepipe, Mauritius. The New George V Stadium has a capacity of 6,500.

== History ==
The construction of the George V Stadium started in 1954 and the stadium was ready in 1955. In November 2002, the old stadium was demolished and the new stadium was opened in August 2003 and it was renamed as the New George V Stadium. It was used in the Indian Ocean Island Games in 2003 and has been the national team's home ground ever since. However, some matches are also played at the Anjalay Stadium.
