= Anjalay Stadium =

Stadium in Belle Vue Harel, Mauritius

Stade Anjalay
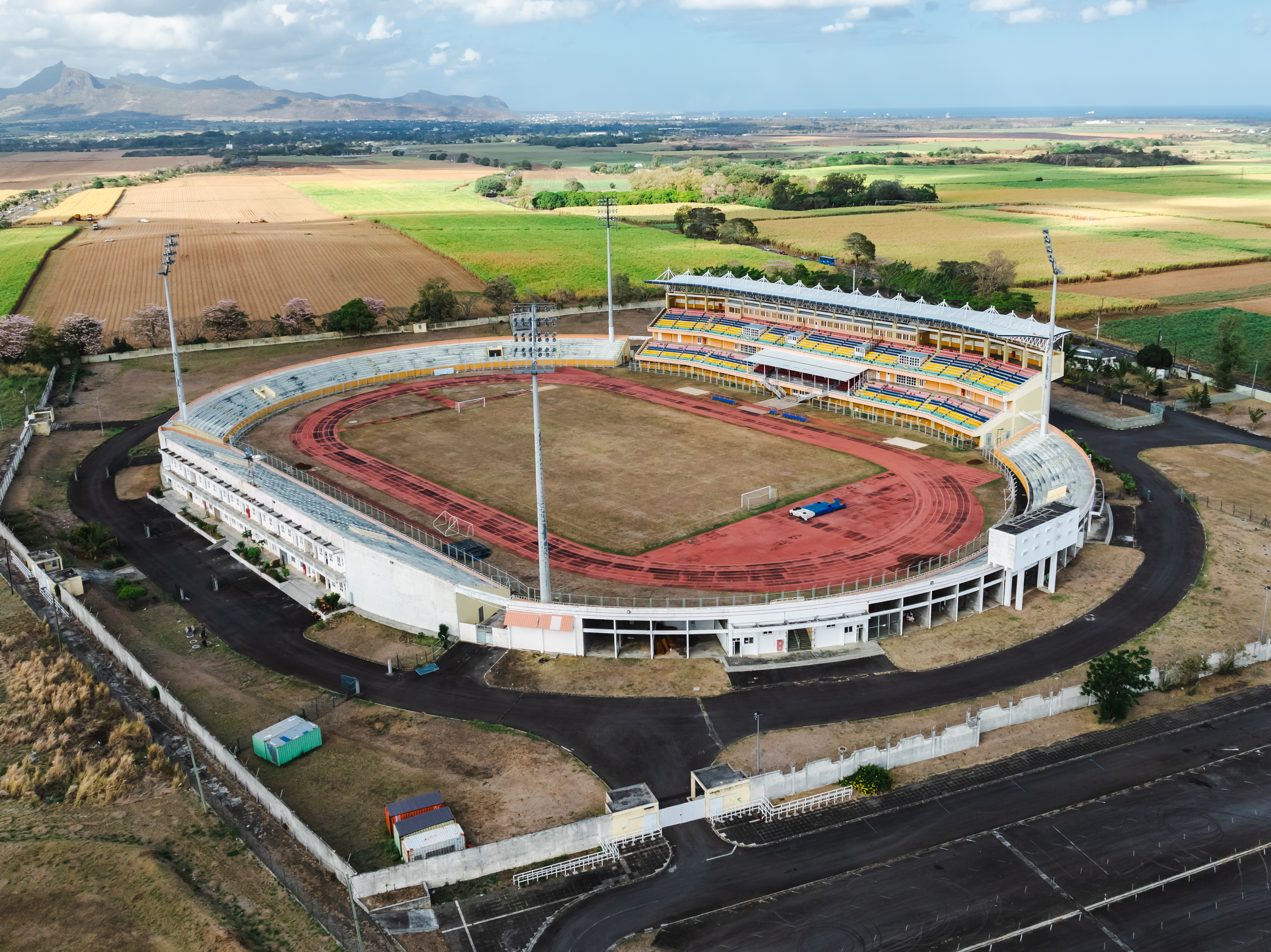
- Interactive map of Stade Anjalay
- Former names: Sir Anerood Jugnauth stadium
- Location: Belle Vue Harel, Mauritius
- Coordinates: 20°04′44″S 57°36′00″E
- Capacity: 16,000
- Surface: Grass

Construction
- Opened: 26 January 1991
- Renovated: 2003
- Structural engineer: Madhaav

Tenants
- Mauritius national football team, Pamplemousses SC, AS Rivière du Rempart, Arsenal Wanderers

The Anjalay Stadium is a multi-use stadium in Belle Vue Harel, Pamplemousses District, Mauritius. At present, it mostly hosts football matches. The parking area of the stadium is also used for car racing and motorcycle racing. The stadium can accommodate 16,000 spectators and was renovated in 2003 at a cost of $15 million.
