= Cercle de Joachim SC =

- Full name: Cercle de Joachim Sports Club
- Nickname: "The Eagles"
- Founded: 2004
- Ground: Stade George V Curepipe, Plaines Wilhems District
- Capacity: 6,200
- Chairman: Sandeep Joshi
- Manager: Geoffrey Moiselle
- League: Mauritian League
- 2025–26: 4th
Home colours

Cercle de Joachim SC is a Mauritian football club based in Curepipe. Founded in 2004, they play in the Mauritian League, the top division in Mauritian football. The club has won the last two titles including the first ever Mauritian professional football club. Cercle De Joachim has a great rivalry against Curepipe Starlight, the other club of Curepipe. The club is also known to have a decent fan base.

== Honours ==
- Mauritian League: 4
  - 2014, 2015, 2024, 2025
- Mauritian Republic Cup: 1
  - 2016

== Stadium ==
Their home stadium is Stade George V (cap. 6,200), located in Curepipe, Plaines Wilhems District. They share this stadium with Curepipe Starlight SC.
