= AS Rivière du Rempart =

Mauritian football club

- Full name: Association Sportive Rivière du Rempart
- Founded: 2000
- Ground: Stade Anjalay; Belle Vue Maurel, Pamplemousses District
- Capacity: 16,000
- Chairman: Sandeep Murthy
- Manager: Kairav Jhugroo
- League: Premier League
- 2025–26: 5th
Home colours

AS Rivière du Rempart is a Mauritian football club based in Mapou, Rivière du Rempart District. Founded in 2000, they play in the Mauritian Premier League, the top division in Mauritian football.

They have never won the league or any domestic cups.

== Titles ==
National Division 1: 1

2025

== Ground ==
The club's home stadium is the 16,000-capacity Stade Anjalay in Belle Vue Maurel, Pamplemousses District. They share this stadium with Pamplemousses SC.
