= AS Vacoas-Phoenix =

AS de Vacoas-Phoenix
- Full name: Association Sportive de Vacoas-Phoenix
- Founded: 2000
- Ground: Stade George V Curepipe, Plaines Wilhems District
- Capacity: 6,200
- Chairman: George Caillaud
- Manager: Tharman Chatterjee
- League: Mauritian League
- 2025–26: 8th

AS de Vacoas-Phoenix is a Mauritian football club based in the town of Vacoas-Phoenix. Founded in 2000, they play in the Mauritian League, the top division in Mauritian football.

== Ground ==
Their home stadium is Stade George V (cap. 6,200), located in Curepipe, Plaines Wilhems District. They share this stadium with Curepipe Starlight SC.

== Achievements ==
- Mauritian FA Cup: 1

2010

- Mauritian Republic Cup: 1

2006

- Mauritian Millennium Cup: 1

1999/00

== Performance in CAF competitions ==
- CAF Champions League: 1 appearance

2000 – Preliminary Round

- CAF Confederation Cup: 1 appearance

2009 – First Round
