= Petite Rivière Noire FC =

- Full name: Petite Rivière Noire Football Club
- Nickname: Tii riviere
- Founded: 1998
- Ground: Stade Germain Comarmond, Bambous, Black River District
- Capacity: 5,000
- Chairman: Francis AUGUSTE
- Manager: Kévin FRANCINEAU
- League: Mauritian League
- 2025–26: 7th
Home colours

Petite Rivière Noire FC is a Mauritian football club based in Black River. They play in the Mauritian League, the top tier of Mauritian football. The club won the first charity shield against Cercle de Joachim SC in 2014.

They won the domestic cup title for the first time in 2007, thus qualifying for the CAF Confederation Cup 2008.

== Ground ==
Their home stadium is Stade Germain Comarmond (cap. 5,000), located in Bambous, Black River District.

== Achievements ==
- Mauritian Cup: 3

2007, 2014, 2015

- Mauritius Charity Shield: 1
  - 2014

== Performance in CAF competitions ==
- CAF Confederation Cup: 2 appearances

2008 – Preliminary Round
2015 – Preliminary Round
