= Pamplemousses SC =

Mauritian football club

- Full name: Pamplemousses Sporting Club
- Founded: 2000; 26 years ago
- Ground: Stade Anjalay; Belle Vue Harel, Pamplemousses
- Capacity: 16,000
- Chairman: Eric Lim
- Manager: Roopesh Neerunjun
- League: Mauritian League
- 2025–26: 2nd
Home colours	Away colours

Pamplemousses Sporting Club is a Mauritian football club based in Belle Vue Harel. They play in the Mauritian League, the top tier of Mauritian football.

== Ground ==
Their home stadium is Stade Anjalay (cap. 18,000), located in Belle Vue Maurel, Pamplemousses.

== Achievements ==
- Mauritian League: 6

2005–06, 2010, 2011–12, 2016–17, 2017–18, 2018–19

- Mauritian Cup: 4

2009, 2016, 2018, 2024

- Mauritian Republic Cup: 7

2010, 2011, 2012–13, 2016–17, 2019, 2020, 2022–23

== Performance in CAF competitions ==
- CAF Champions League: 3 appearances

2007 – Preliminary Round
2018 – Preliminary Round
2020 – Preliminary Round

- CAF Confederation Cup: 2 appearances

2010 – Preliminary Round
2017 – Preliminary Round

=== African record ===
Year	Competition	Round	Opponent	Home	Away	Aggregate
2007	CAF Champions League	PR	(Zimbabwe) Highlanders	1–0	0–1	1–1
2010	CAF Confederation Cup	PR	(South Africa) Moroka Swallows	1–0	0–1	1–1
2017	CAF Confederation Cup	PR	(Zimbabwe) Ngezi Platinum	1–1	0–1	1–2
2018	CAF Champions League	PR	(South Africa) Bidvest Wits	1–0	2–0	1–2
