= AS Port-Louis 2000 =

Association football league in Mauritius

- Full name: Association Sportive Port-Louis 2000
- Nickname: Musketeers
- Founded: 2000; 26 years ago
- Ground: St. François Xavier Stadium
- Capacity: 5,000
- Owner: Sanofi Aventis
- Chairman: Ismaël Affejee
- Manager: Kofy Kawata
- League: Mauritian Premier League
- 2025–26: 6th
Home colours	Away colours

Association Sportive Port-Louis 2000 is a Mauritian professional football club based in the nation's capital Port Louis. AS Port-Louis 2000 plays in the Mauritian Premier League. They won their last title in 2016. The club was formed following the regionalisation of football in Mauritius by a merger between the Roche Bois-based Roche Bois Boys Scouts (RBBS)-St Martin United FC and Century Welfare Association of the Cite Martial suburb of Port-Louis.

== Stadium ==
Football stadium St. François Xavier Stadium (cap. 5,000), located in Port Louis, Mauritius is the home to AS Port-Louis 2000. The team also has its club house and training ground on the premises of the Champ de Mars Racecourse.

== Notable coaches ==
- (Belgium) Joe Tshupula
- (Madagascar) Fidy Rasonaivo
- (Mauritius) Sakoor Boodhun

== Achievements ==
- Mauritian League: 6

2002, 2003, 2003/04, 2004/05, 2011, 2015/16

- Mauritian Cup: 3

2002, 2005, 2017

- Mauritian Republic Cup: 4

2001, 2004, 2005, 2013/14

== Performance in CAF competitions ==
- CAF Champions League: 4 appearances

2003 – Second Round
2004 – First Round
2005 – Preliminary Round
2006 – First Round
