= Football at the 2011 Indian Ocean Island Games – Men's team squads =

The following is a list of squads for each nation that competed in the football tournament at the 2011 Indian Ocean Island Games in Seychelles from 4 August to 14 August 2011. Each squad consists of at the most 20 players.

Caps, goals, club teams and ages as of 4 August 2011, before the 2011 Indian Ocean Island Games.

== Group A ==
=== Comoros ===
Head coach: (Comoros) Mohamed Abdéramane Chamité

No.	Pos.	Player	Date of birth (age)	Caps	Goals	Club
	GK	Mohamed Hassani Mbalia	15 August 1984 (aged 26)	7	0	(Comoros) Elan Club
	GK	Djâbir El-Djâbir	N/A			(Comoros) Volcan Club
	DF	Mounir Abdérémane	N/A			(Comoros) Volcan Club
	DF	Mahamoud Ali M'Changama	N/A	6	0	(Comoros) Apaches Club
	DF	Abdoulhamid El Mamoun	N/A			(Comoros) Volcan Club
	DF	David Humblot	N/A	3	0	(Comoros) Coin Nord
	DF	Saïd Mhoudine	N/A			(Belgium) C.S. Visé
	DF	Ali Mourad	N/A			(Switzerland) FC La Sarraz-Ecläpens
	DF	Ali Rassoul	N/A	5	0	(Comoros) Apaches Club
	MF	Damine Abdoulhaniou	10 September 1982 (aged 28)	7	0	(Comoros) Chirazienne Domoni
	MF	Nourdine Ali Mzitrani	N/A	2	0	(Comoros) Coin Nord
	MF	Soilihi Bourhane	N/A			(Comoros) ASIM Itsandra
	MF	Ayad Ismaël	N/A			(Mayotte) FC Majicavo Koropa
	MF	Ibrahim Mchinda Madîhali (captain)	16 November 1988 (aged 22)			(France) US 1er Canton
	MF	Abdallah Mfoihaya	N/A			(Norway) Oslo City FC
	FW	Saïd Anfane Boura	N/A	1	0	(Comoros) Fomboni Club
	FW	Saïd Hachim	N/A			(Comoros) Ngaya Club
	FW	Djamal Msaidié	N/A			(Comoros) Coin Nord
	FW	Athoumane Soulaimane	N/A			(Comoros) Style Nouvel

=== Maldives ===
Head coach: (Argentina) Andrés Cruciani

No.	Pos.	Player	Date of birth (age)	Caps	Goals	Club
	GK	Mohamed Faisal	4 September 1988 (aged 22)	3	0	(Maldives) Victory SC
	GK	Imran Mohamed	12 February 1985 (aged 26)	44	0	(Maldives) Club Valencia
	DF	Ahmed Abdulla	N/A	0	0	(Maldives) New Radiant SC
	DF	Akram Abdul Ghani	19 March 1987 (aged 24)	16	0	(Maldives) VB Sports Club
	DF	Assad Abdul Ghani	2 January 1976 (aged 35)	37	1	(Maldives) Club Valencia
	DF	Mohamed Jameel	24 March 1984 (aged 27)	39	1	(Maldives) Club Valencia
	DF	Sobah Mohamed	18 April 1980 (aged 31)	4	0	(Maldives) New Radiant SC
	DF	Ahmed Saeed	17 September 1980 (aged 30)	11	0	(Maldives) VB Sports Club
	DF	Mohamed Umair	3 July 1988 (aged 23)	12	1	(Maldives) VB Sports Club
	MF	Mohamed Arif	11 August 1985 (aged 25)	13	0	(Maldives) VB Sports Club
	MF	Ibrahim Fazeel	9 October 1980 (aged 30)	45	12	(Maldives) Victory SC
	MF	Ismail Mohamed	16 March 1980 (aged 31)	16	0	(Maldives) VB Sports Club
	MF	Mukhthar Naseer	7 May 1979 (aged 32)	17	4	(Maldives) Victory SC
	MF	Shamweel Qasim	20 June 1982 (aged 29)	17	3	(Maldives) VB Sports Club
	MF	Ahmed Shafiu	13 November 1979 (aged 31)	2	0	(Maldives) Club Valencia
	FW	Ashad Ali	14 September 1986 (aged 24)	12	2	(Maldives) Victory SC
	FW	Ali Ashfaq (captain)	6 September 1985 (aged 25)	27	16	(Maldives) VB Sports Club
	FW	Ali Fasir	4 September 1988 (aged 22)	2	0	(Maldives) All Youth Linkage FC
	FW	Ahmed Rasheed	N/A	4	0	(Maldives) Maaziya SRC
	FW	Ahmed Thoriq	4 October 1980 (aged 30)	17	6	(Maldives) VB Sports Club

=== Mauritius ===
Head coach: (Mauritius) Akbar Patel

No.	Pos.	Player	Date of birth (age)	Caps	Goals	Club
1	GK	Aboobakar Augustin	29 January 1985 (aged 26)	2	0	(Mauritius) Petite Rivière Noire SC
16	GK	Ivahn Marie-Josée	4 November 1978 (aged 32)	7	0	(Mauritius) AS de Vacoas-Phoenix
3	DF	Christopher Bazerque	31 March 1987 (aged 24)	15	0	(Mauritius) Petite Rivière Noire SC
4	DF	Joye Estazie	10 August 1984 (aged 26)	3	0	(Mauritius) AS de Vacoas-Phoenix
15	DF	Almondo Fricain	4 April 1985 (aged 26)	10	0	(Mauritius) Petite Rivière Noire SC
19	DF	Cédric Permal	8 December 1991 (aged 19)	2	0	(Mauritius) AS de Vacoas-Phoenix
5	DF	Bruno Ravina	24 March 1984 (aged 27)	21	0	(Mauritius) AS Port-Louis 2000
2	DF	Chandrayah Veeranah	N/A	3	0	(Mauritius) Curepipe Starlight SC
10	MF	Stéphane Badul	3 February 1983 (aged 28)	6	0	(Mauritius) Petite Rivière Noire SC
8	MF	Colin Bell (captain)	17 February 1979 (aged 32)	12	0	(Mauritius) Pamplemousses SC
6	MF	Jonathan Bru	2 May 1985 (aged 26)	5	2	(Portugal) U.D. Oliveirense
13	MF	Guillano Chiffone	N/A	1	0	(Mauritius) Savanne SC
7	MF	Menzy Coco	22 December 1989 (aged 21)	2	0	(Mauritius) AS Port-Louis 2000
14	MF	Jimmy Cundasamy	14 July 1977 (aged 34)	47	2	(Réunion) US Stade Tamponnaise
18	MF	Kervin Godon	3 August 1982 (aged 29)	26	2	(Réunion) Saint-Denis FC
12	MF	Jerry Louis	12 February 1978 (aged 33)	32	3	(Réunion) FC Avirons
17	MF	Fabien Pithia	7 May 1987 (aged 24)	8	0	(Mauritius) Savanne SC
20	MF	Fabrice Pithia	7 May 1987 (aged 24)	18	0	(Mauritius) Curepipe Starlight SC
9	FW	Gurty Calambé	14 May 1990 (aged 21)	1	0	(Mauritius) Petite Rivière Noire SC
11	FW	Andy Sophie	27 June 1987 (aged 24)	16	2	(Réunion) JS Saint-Pierroise

=== Seychelles ===
Head coach: (Seychelles) Ralph Jean-Louis

No.	Pos.	Player	Date of birth (age)	Caps	Goals	Club
	GK	Vincent Euphrasie	N/A	0	0	(Seychelles) La Passe FC
	GK	Nelson Sopha	13 September 1974 (aged 36)	27	0	(Seychelles) St Michel United FC
	GK	Eugene Valentin	18 September 1984 (aged 26)	0	0	(Seychelles) St Roch United FC
	DF	Jonathan Bibi	28 July 1984 (aged 27)	19	0	(Seychelles) Saint Louis Suns United
	DF	Nigel Freminot	5 June 1980 (aged 31)	13	0	(Seychelles) St Michel United FC
	DF	Jones Joubert	N/A	3	0	(Seychelles) The Lions
	DF	Allen Larue	16 June 1981 (aged 30)	8	0	(Seychelles) St Michel United FC
	DF	Ronny Marengo	30 August 1990 (aged 20)	3	0	(Seychelles) Northern Dynamo
	MF	Don Anacoura (captain)	6 May 1981 (aged 30)	17	3	(Seychelles) St Michel United FC
	MF	Brian Dorby	N/A	3	0	(Seychelles) Saint Louis Suns United
	MF	Henny Dufresne	10 October 1980 (aged 30)	19	0	(Seychelles) St Michel United FC
	MF	Karl Hall	4 July 1988 (aged 23)	0	0	(Seychelles) St Michel United FC
	MF	Archille Henriette	25 April 1987 (aged 24)	8	0	(Seychelles) La Passe FC
	MF	Nelson Laurence	19 October 1984 (aged 26)	8	1	(Seychelles) St Michel United FC
	MF	Alex Nibourette	26 December 1983 (aged 27)	17	0	(Seychelles) St Michel United FC
	MF	Trevor Poiret	15 October 1988 (aged 22)	3	1	(Seychelles) Saint Louis Suns United
	MF	Gervais Waye-Hive	11 June 1988 (aged 23)	0	0	(Seychelles) St Michel United FC
	FW	Alpha Baldé	25 February 1973 (aged 38)	9	1	(Seychelles) Saint Louis Suns United
	FW	Kevin Betsy	20 March 1978 (aged 33)	0	0	(England) Wycombe Wanderers F.C.
	MF	Wilnes Brutus	13 January 1983 (aged 28)	9	3	(Seychelles) St Michel United FC

== Group B ==
=== Madagascar ===
Head coach: (Madagascar) Mosa

No.	Pos.	Player	Date of birth (age)	Caps	Goals	Club
	GK	Robin Jean Claude Rakotonirina	N/A	0	0	(Madagascar) ASCUM
	GK	Hector Kandy Rambelomasina	February 17, 1981 (aged 30)	5	0	(Madagascar) Japan Actuel's FC
	DF	Abdallah Aoulad	N/A			(Madagascar) CNaPS Sport
	DF	Léonard Besabotsy	N/A			(Madagascar) AS Adema
	DF	Tovo Rabenandrasana	11 December 1987 (aged 23)	10	2	(Madagascar) Académie Ny Antsika
	DF	Jimmy Radafison (captain)	March 13, 1980 (aged 31)	32	0	(Seychelles) Saint Louis Suns United
	DF	Valéry Solo Rakotoarinosy	N/A	3	0	(Seychelles) La Passe FC
	DF	Mamy Gervais Randrianarisoa	7 November 1984 (aged 26)	26	0	(Réunion) AJ Petite-Ile
	DF	Pierralit Tovonay	N/A			(Madagascar) Ajesaia
	MF	Urbain Andriamampionona	10 August 1989 (aged 21)	5	0	(Madagascar) Académie Ny Antsika
	MF	Edgard Nandrasana	26 November 1981 (aged 29)	2	0	(Madagascar) ASCUM
	MF	Baggio Rakotonomenjanahary	N/A			(Réunion) US Stade Tamponnaise
	MF	Andry Lalaina Rakotozanany	N/A			(Mauritius) AS Port-Louis 2000
	MF	Jean Jacques Razanajafy	N/A			(Madagascar) Ajesaia
	FW	Boto Fagnorena	N/A	2	0	(Madagascar) Japan Actuel's FC
	FW	Lanto Rabeasimbola	9 January 1988 (aged 23)	3	0	(Madagascar) Japan Actuel's FC
	FW	Yvan Rajoarimanana	23 August 1988 (aged 22)	9	1	(Madagascar) Japan Actuel's FC
	FW	Jeannot Vombola	N/A			(Madagascar) CNaPS Sport

=== Mayotte ===
Head coach: (Mayotte) Abidi Massoundi

No.	Pos.	Player	Date of birth (age)	Caps	Goals	Club
	GK	Halifa Abdallah	N/A			(Mayotte) FC Mtsapéré
	GK	Moussa Mouayadi	N/A			(Mayotte) AS Rosador
	DF	Youssouf Ibrahim-Ithzak	N/A			(Mayotte) AS Rosador
	DF	Bamana Moussa	N/A			(Mayotte) AS Neige
	DF	Assani Soihirin	N/A			(France) Association Regard d'Avenir
	DF	Djaha Sulayman	N/A			(Mayotte) FC Labattoir
	DF	Said Yazidou	N/A			(France) Jumeaux
	MF	Madi Aboubacar	N/A			(France) AS Aixe-Sur-Vienne
	MF	Anli Ousseni	N/A			(Réunion) AS Excelsior
	MF	Ybnou Charaf Ben-Hamadi	11 February 1983 (aged 28)			(France) RCO Agde
	MF	Mouhamadi Ben-Housman	N/A			(Mayotte) Foudre 2000 de Dzoumogné
	MF	Ben Ahmed Djadid	N/A			(Réunion) US Stade Tamponnaise
	MF	Mcolo El-Yanour	N/A			(Mayotte) FC Labattoir
	MF	Souffou Kadri	N/A			(Mayotte) RC Barakani
	MF	Mhadji Mihidjai	N/A			(Réunion) Saint-Denis FC
	MF	Ridjali Souffou	N/A			(Mayotte) FC Mtsapéré
	FW	Abdou Lihariti Antoissi	N/A			(Mayotte) FC Mtsapéré
	FW	Djardji Nadhoime (captain)	15 July 1980 (aged 31)			(Réunion) AS Excelsior
	FW	Antoine Rasolofonirina	N/A			(Réunion) Saint-Pauloise FC

=== Réunion ===
Head coach: (Réunion) Jean-Pierre Bade

No.	Pos.	Player	Date of birth (age)	Caps	Goals	Club
	GK	Fabrice Marbois	July 25, 1976 (aged 35)	1	0	(Réunion) US Sainte-Marienne
	GK	Mathieu Pélops	N/A	1	0	(Réunion) Saint-Pauloise FC
	DF	Yohan Boulard	N/A	6	1	(Réunion) JS Saint-Pierroise
	DF	John Elcaman	15 June 1977 (aged 34)	15	1	(Réunion) JS Saint-Pierroise
	DF	Sébastien K'Bidi	N/A	2	0	(Réunion) US Sainte-Marienne
	DF	Yohan Lionel	13 November 1981 (aged 29)	14	0	(Réunion) JS Saint-Pierroise
	DF	William Mounoussamy	23 November 1980 (aged 30)	15	1	(Réunion) US Stade Tamponnaise
	DF	Gaël Payet	10 February 1984 (aged 27)	14	0	(Réunion) US Stade Tamponnaise
	DF	Thomas Souevamanien	N/A	1	0	(Réunion) JS Saint-Pierroise
	MF	Kévin Androge	N/A	2	0	(Réunion) US Sainte-Marienne
	MF	Roberto Elcaman	N/A	7	0	(Réunion) US Stade Tamponnaise
	MF	Éric Farro (captain)	26 June 1977 (aged 34)	12	5	(Réunion) Saint-Pauloise FC
	MF	Nicolas Hoarau	27 September 1983 (aged 27)	12	1	(Réunion) Saint-Pauloise FC
	MF	Gérard Hubert	14 October 1980 (aged 30)	15	0	(Réunion) Saint-Pauloise FC
	MF	Pascal N'Gongué	N/A	10	1	(Réunion) SS Saint-Louisienne
	FW	Mamoudou Diallo	N/A	5	8	(Réunion) JS Saint-Pierroise
	FW	Mohamed El Madaghri	N/A	1	0	(Réunion) US Stade Tamponnaise
	FW	Jean-Michel Fontaine	28 August 1988 (aged 22)	9	1	(Réunion) US Stade Tamponnaise
	FW	Mickaël Vallant	N/A	1	3	(Réunion) Saint-Denis FC
	FW	Willy Visnelda	12 April 1975 (aged 36)	12	5	(Réunion) SS Saint-Louisienne
