= Mauritius national football team results (2010–2019) =

The following are all matches played by the Mauritius national football team from 2010-2019.

== Key ==
Win Draw Loss

== 2010 ==
September 4, 2010 2012 ACON Qual.	Mauritius	1–3	Cameroon	Belle Vue Maurel, Mauritius
15:45 UTC+4	Badul (yellow card) 35'; Bru 45' (pen.); Ravina (yellow card) 70'		36', 47' Eto'o; 60' (pen.) Choupo-Moting	Stadium: Stade Anjalay; Attendance: 6,000; Referee: (South Africa) Jerome Damon

October 2, 2010 Friendly	Mauritius	1–1	(Mauritius) ASVP	Bambous, Mauritius
16:00 UTC+4	? (?)	(Report)	(?) ?	Stadium: Stade Germain Comarmond

October 9, 2010 2012 ACON Qual.	Senegal	7–0	Mauritius	Dakar, Senegal
18:30 UTC±0	Cissé 8', 38', 76'; N'Daw (yellow card) 14'; Niang 23', 62'; Diakhaté (yellow card) 33'; Sow 45+2'; Estazie 90' (o.g.)	(Report)		Stadium: Stade Leopold Senghor; Attendance: 50,000; Referee: (South Africa) David Bennett

== 2011 ==
March 15, 2011 Friendly	Mauritius	1–0	(Mauritius) Petite Rivière Noire SC	Bambous, Mauritius
	Veeranah (?)	(Report)		Stadium: Stade Germain Comarmond

March 20, 2011 Friendly	Orlando Pirates FC (South Africa)	Canceled	Mauritius	Johannesburg, South Africa
15:30 SAST				Stadium: Orlando Stadium

March 22, 2011 Friendly	Bidvest Wits (South Africa)	2–0	Mauritius	Johannesburg, South Africa
15:30 SAST	Unknown 15'; Unknown 70'	(Report)		Stadium: Bidvest Stadium

March 24, 2011 Int. Friendly	South Africa U-23	2–0	Mauritius	Emmarentia, South Africa
	Xulu (?); Bhengu (?)	(Report)		Stadium: Marks Park Ground

March 27, 2011 2012 ACON Qual.	DR Congo	3 - 0	Mauritius	Kinshasa, DR Congo
15:30 UTC+1	LuaLua 24' (pen.); Matumona 49'; Ilunga 69' (pen.)	(in French) Report		Stadium: Stade des Martyrs; Referee: (Nigeria) Wokoma Solomon

April 26, 2011 Friendly	Mauritius	2–0	(Mauritius) AS Port-Louis 2000	Bambous, Mauritius
18:00 UTC+4	Rummun (?); Sockalingum (?)	(Report)		Stadium: Stade Germain Comarmond

May 3, 2011 Friendly	Mauritius	3–1	(Mauritius) ASVP	Bambous, Mauritius
	? (?); Louis (?); Godon (?)	(Report)	(?) ?	Stadium: Stade Germain Comarmond

May 18, 2011 Friendly	Mauritius	1–0	(England) Fulham Academy	Belle Vue Maurel, Mauritius
18:00 UTC+4	Calambé 37'	(Report)		Stadium: Stade Anjalay; Referee: (Mauritius) Rajindraparsad Seechurn

May 26, 2011 Int. Friendly	Mauritius	0–1	South Africa U-23	Belle Vue Maurel, Mauritius
18:00 UTC+4	Chiffone (yellow card) 17'	(Report)	(yellow card) 41' Mampuru; 51' Masongo	Stadium: Stade Anjalay; Referee: (Mauritius) Imteeaz Soodul

May 29, 2011 Int. Friendly	Mauritius	0–0	South Africa U-23	Belle Vue Maurel, Mauritius
15:00 UTC+4	Chiffone (yellow card) 17'	(Report)	(yellow card) 87' Mphalele	Stadium: Stade Anjalay; Referee: (Mauritius) Ganesh Chuttoree

June 5, 2011 2012 ACON Qual.	Mauritius	1–2	DR Congo	Belle Vue Maurel, Mauritius
15:00 UTC+4	Bru 10' (pen.)	(Report)	16' Ilunga; 45+1' Kabangu	Stadium: Stade Anjalay; Attendance: 5,000; Referee: (Malawi) Ngosi Kalyoto

July 8, 2011 Friendly	Orlando Pirates FC (South Africa)	3–1	Mauritius	Pretoria, South Africa
	? 65' ? 78' ? 82'	(Report)	13' Calambé	Stadium: High Performance Centre

July 11, 2011 Friendly	Mpumalanga Black Aces F.C. (South Africa)	1–1	Mauritius	Johannesburg, South Africa
16:30 UTC+4	? 60'	(Report)	20' Pithia

July 14, 2011 Friendly	Platinum Stars F.C. (South Africa)	2–0	Mauritius	Pretoria, South Africa
16:30 UTC+4	? 48' ? 75'	(Report)		Stadium: High Performance Centre

July 16, 2011 Friendly	University of Pretoria F.C. (South Africa)	1–1	Mauritius	Pretoria, South Africa
	? 40'	(Report)	Sophie 72'	Stadium: High Performance Centre

July 29, 2011 Int. Friendly	Mauritius	0–2	Mayotte	Rose-Hill, Mauritius
15:00 UTC+4		(Report)	Ridjali 38'; Youssouf 55'	Stadium: Stade Sir Gaëtan Duval; Referee: (Mauritius) Rajindraparsad Seechurn

August 4, 2011 2011 IOIG	Maldives	1–1	Mauritius	Praslin, Seychelles
16:45 UTC+4	Arif (yellow card) 17' (goal) 32'; Shafiu (yellow card) 27'	(Report)	9' Pithia; (yellow card) 34' Calambé; (yellow card) 71' Ravina; (yellow card) 77' Cundasamy	Stadium: Stade d'Amitié; Attendance: 1,800; Referee: (Madagascar) Jean-Pierre Rakotonjanahary

August 6, 2011 2011 IOIG	Seychelles	2–1	Mauritius	Roche Caïman, Mahé, Seychelles
16:30 UTC+4	Laurence 1'; Henriette 28'; Joubert (yellow card) 32'; Larue (yellow card) 61'; Anacoura (yellow card) 89'	(Report)	(yellow card) 55' Bazerque; 77' Pithia	Stadium: Stade Linité; Attendance: 6,500; Referee: (Mayotte) Harouna Rassuhi

August 9, 2011 2011 IOIG	Mauritius	2–0	Comoros	Praslin, Seychelles
18:00 UTC+4	Bazerque (yellow card); Pithia (yellow card) (goal) 35'; Calambé 87'	(Report)		Stadium: Stade d'Amitié; Attendance: 300; Referee: (Mayotte) Harouna Rassuhi

August 11, 2011 2011 IOIG	Mayotte	0–0 (a.e.t.) (4–5 p)	Mauritius	Roche Caïman, Mahé, Seychelles
18:30 UTC+4		(Report)		Stadium: Stade Linité; Attendance: 2,500; Referee: (Seychelles) Bernard Camille
	Penalties
	Mihidjai (penalty scored); Souffou (penalty missed); Rasolofonirina (penalty scored); Ben-Hamadi (penalty scored); Djadid (penalty scored)		(penalty scored) Veeranah; (penalty scored) Cundasamy; (penalty scored) Sophie; (penalty scored) Ravina; (penalty scored) Bell

August 13, 2011 2011 IOIG	Seychelles	1–1 (4–3 p)	Mauritius	Roche Caïman, Mahé, Seychelles
17:30 UTC+4	Henriette (yellow card) 5'; Betsy 16'; Anacoura (yellow card) 104'	(Report)	(yellow card) 67' Veeranah; 62' Louis; (yellow card) 118' Pithia	Stadium: Stade Linité; Attendance: 10,000; Referee: (Réunion) Steeve Dubec
	Penalties
	Betsy (penalty scored); Henriette (penalty scored); Bibi (penalty missed); Nibourette (penalty scored); Anacoura (penalty scored)		(penalty missed) Veeranah; (penalty scored) Cundasamy; (penalty scored) Sophie; (penalty scored) Bru; (penalty missed) Bell

September 3, 2011 2012 ACON Qual.	Cameroon	5–0	Mauritius	Yaoundé, Cameroon
15:00 UTC+1	Kweuke 63'; Mbuta 72'; Eto'o 84' (pen.); Choupo-Moting 90', 90+3'; Efoulou (yellow card) 90'	(Report)	(yellow card) 35' Estazie; (yellow card) 70' Bazerque	Stadium: Stade Ahmadou Ahidjo; Attendance: 10,000; Referee: (Guinea) Aboubacar Mario Bangoura

September 30, 2011 Friendly	Mauritius	2–0	(Mauritius) Cercle de Joachim SC	Réduit, Mauritius
	Calambé (?); Nabab (?)	(Report)		Stadium: Stade Maryse Justin

October 1, 2011 Friendly	Mauritius	0–1	(Mauritius) Curepipe Starlight SC	Belle Vue Maurel, Mauritius
		(Report)		Stadium: Stade Anjalay

October 5, 2011 Friendly	Mauritius	1–1	(Mauritius) Petite Rivière Noire SC	Belle Vue Maurel, Mauritius
	Pithia (?)	(Report)	(?) Pierre	Stadium: Stade Anjalay

October 9, 2011 2012 ACON Qual.	Mauritius	0–2	Senegal	Belle Vue Maurel, Mauritius
16:00 UTC+4	Badul (red card) 15'	(Report)	10' (yellow card) 79' N'Doye; 26' Cissé	Stadium: Stade Anjalay; Attendance: 1,500; Referee: (Zambia) Janny Sikazwe

November 11, 2011 2014 WC Qual.	Mauritius	w/o	Liberia	Belle Vue Maurel, Mauritius
		(Report)		Stadium: Stade Anjalay

November 15, 2011 2014 WC Qual.	Liberia	w/o	Mauritius	Paynesville, Liberia
		(Report)		Stadium: National Complex

== 2012 ==
September 15, 2012 Friendly	Mauritius	1–1	Réunion	Curepipe, Mauritius
15:30 UTC+4	Estazie 43'	(Report)	59' Fontaine	Stadium: Stade George V Referee: D. Hurbangs

December 1, 2012 2014 CHAN qual.	Mauritius	2–0	Comoros	Curepipe, Mauritius
15:00 UTC+4	Calambé 59'; Pithia 72'	(Report)		Stadium: Stade George V Referee: Abdoul Kanoso (Madagascar)

December 15, 2012 2014 CHAN qual.	Comoros	0–0	Mauritius	Mitsamiouli, Comoros
16:00 UTC+4		(Report)		Stadium: Stade Said Mohamed Cheikh; Referee: Samuel Chirinda (Mozambique)

== 2013 ==
6 July 2013 2013 COSAFA Cup	Mauritius	1–2	Namibia	Lusaka, Zambia
14:30 UTC+2	Coco (yellow card) 32'; Pierre 85'	(Report)	19' Shitembi; (yellow card) 40' Horaeb; 44' Jacob	Stadium: Nkoloma Stadium; Attendance: 4,500; Referee: (Zambia) Janny Sikazwe

10 July 2013 2013 COSAFA Cup	Mauritius	4–0	Seychelles	Kitwe, Zambia
15:00 UTC+2	Calambé 15'; Pierre 22', 73'; Pithia 35'; Bazerque (yellow card) 89'	(Report)	(red card) 33' Henriette; (yellow card) 57' Constance; (yellow card) 90' Marie	Stadium: Nkana Stadium; Referee: (South Africa) Victor Gomes

28 July 2013 2014 CHAN qual.	Mauritius	0–3	Zimbabwe	Curepipe, Mauritius
15:00 UTC+4		(Report)	15', 90' Mazivisa; 58' Sithole; (yellow card) 78' Chipeta	Stadium: Stade George V Referee: (Seychelles) Nelson Émile

4 August 2013 2014 CHAN qual.	Zimbabwe	1–1	Mauritius	Harare, Zimbabwe
14:00 UTC+4	Mambare 88'	(Report)	90' Calambé	Stadium: Rufaro Stadium; Referee: (Mozambique) Samuel Chirindza

5 September 2013 Friendly	Qatar	3–0	Mauritius	Doha, Qatar
16:30 UTC+3	Bakur 35'; Mohammed 86' (pen.); Afif 90+2'	(Report)		Stadium: Jassim Bin Hamad Stadium

== 2014 ==
12 April 2014 2015 AFCON qual.	Mauritania	1–0	Mauritius	Nouakchott, Mauritania
17:00 UTC±0	Ba 23'; Bagayoko (yellow card) 50'	(Report)	(yellow card) 12' Bazerque; (yellow card) 52' St. Martin; (yellow card) 77' Bru	Stadium: Stade Olympique; Attendance: 8,500; Referee: (Senegal) Maguette N'Diaye

20 April 2014 2015 AFCON qual.	Mauritius	0–2	Mauritania	Curepipe, Mauritius
15:15 UTC+4	Ravina (yellow card) 35'	(Report)	38' Sow; (yellow card) 41' Diakité; 91' Ahmed	Stadium: Stade George V Attendance: 1,000; Referee: (Mozambique) Samuel Chirindza

== 2016 ==
5 June 2016 2017 AFCONQ	Mauritius	0–2	Ghana	Belle Vue Maurel, Mauritius
15:00 MUT		Report	A. Ayew 70'; Atsu 73'	Stadium: Stade Anjalay; Attendance: 8,500; Referee: Bamlak Tessema Weyesa (Ethiopia)

12 June 2016 2016 COSAFA Cup GS	Lesotho	3–0	Mauritius	Windhoek, Namibia
15:00 WAT	Thabantso 1'; Kamela 45+2'; Motebang 90'	Report		Stadium: Independence Stadium; Attendance: 1,500; Referee: Hamada Nampiandraza (Madagascar)

14 June 2016 2016 COSAFA Cup GS	Mauritius	0–1	Malawi	Windhoek, Namibia
19:30 WAT		Report	Gabeya 47'	Stadium: Independence Stadium; Referee: Simanga Nhleko (Swaziland)

16 June 2016 2016 COSAFA Cup GS	Angola	0–2	Mauritius	Windhoek, Namibia
17:00 WAT		Report	Dorza 1'; Sophie 24'	Stadium: Independence Stadium; Attendance: 2,000; Referee: Jackson Pavaza (Namibia)

3 September 2016 2017 AFCONQ	Mozambique	1–0	Mauritius	Maputo, Mozambique
19:30 CAT	Januário 90'	Report		Stadium: Estádio do Zimpeto; Attendance: 15,000; Referee: El Fadil Mohamed (Sudan)

== 2017 ==
24 March 2017 2019 AFCONQ	Comoros	2–0	Mauritius	Mitsamiouli, Comoros
15:00 EAT	Youssouf 65'; Alhadhur 80'	Report		Stadium: Stade Said Mohamed Cheikh; Referee: Martin Eliphas Saanya (Tanzania)

28 March 2017 2019 AFCONQ	Mauritius	1–1	Comoros	Belle Vue Maurel, Mauritius
16:00 MUT	St. Martin 45'	Report	Ben Nabouhane 17'	Stadium: Stade Anjalay; Referee: Nelson Emile Fred (Seychelles)

22 April 2017 2018 CHANQ	Mauritius	2–1	Seychelles	Belle Vue Maurel, Mauritius
16:00 MUT	Jean 6'; Rasolofonirina 50'	Report	Manoo 77'	Stadium: Stade Anjalay; Referee: Andofetra Rakotojaona (Madagascar)

29 April 2017 2018 CHANQ	Seychelles	1–1 (2–3 agg.)	Mauritius	Victoria, Seychelles
16:30 SCT	Corallie 50'	Report	Dorza 15'	Stadium: Stade Linité; Referee: Victor Gomes (South Africa)

25 June 2017 2017 COSAFA Cup	Mauritius	0–1	Angola	Moruleng Stadium, Moruleng
17:30 SAST		Report	Quibeto 4'	Referee: Jackson Pavaza (Namibia)

27 June 2017 2017 COSAFA Cup	Malawi	0–0	Mauritius	Royal Bafokeng Stadium, Phokeng
17:00 SAST		Report		Referee: Lebalang Mokete (Lesotho)

29 June 2017 2017 COSAFA Cup	Tanzania	1–1	Mauritius	Moruleng Stadium, Moruleng
17:00 SAST	Msuva 68'	Report	Perticots 67'	Referee: Hélder Martins De Carvalho (Angola)

16 July 2017 2018 CHANQ	Mauritius	0–1	Angola	Belle Vue Maurel, Mauritius
15:30 MUT		Report	Job 29'	Stadium: Stade Anjalay; Referee: Thando Ndzandzeka (South Africa)

23 July 2017 2018 CHANQ	Angola	3–2 (4–2 agg.)	Mauritius	Luanda, Angola
16:30 WAT	Job 2'; Geraldo 44'; Vá 71'	Report	Perticots 12'; Édouard 45+1'	Stadium: Estádio 11 de Novembro; Referee: Nomore Murambiwa Musundire (Zimbabwe)

19 August 2017 Tri-Nation Series	India	2–1	Mauritius	Mumbai, India
20:30 IST	R. Singh 37'; B. Singh 62'	Report	Jocelyn 15'	Stadium: Mumbai Football Arena; Referee: Hettikamkanamge Perera (Sri Lanka)

22 August 2017 Tri-Nation Series	Saint Kitts and Nevis	1–1	Mauritius	Mumbai, India
20:00 IST	Rogers 87'	Report	Sarah 19'	Stadium: Mumbai Football Arena; Referee: C. R. Srikrishna (India)

9 October 2017 Friendly	Equatorial Guinea	3–1	Mauritius	Bata, Equatorial Guinea
17:00 WAT	Nsue 12', 85'; Bikoro 45'	Report	Nabab 30'	Stadium: Estadio de Bata; Referee: Henry Mouandjo (Cameroon)

12 November 2017 Friendly	Togo	6–0	Mauritius	Lomé, Togo
16:00 GMT	Dossevi 19'; Laba 26', 62', 88', 90+2'; Adebayor 77'	Report		Stadium: Stade de Kégué; Referee: Yanissou Bebou (Togo)

== 2018 ==
22 March 2018 Friendly	Macau	0–1	Mauritius	Taipa, Macau
17:00 MUT		Report	Bru 19'	Stadium: Estádio Campo Desportivo; Referee: Nivon Robesh Gamini (Sri Lanka)

27 March 2018 Friendly	Mongolia	0–2	Mauritius	Ulaanbaatar, Mongolia
16:00 MUT		Report	Justin 5'; Augustin 34'	Stadium: MFF Football Centre; Referee: Doljinsuren Tumenbayar (Mongolia)

28 May 2018 2018 COSAFA Cup	Mauritius	1–0	Malawi	Polokwane, South Africa
21:30 MUT	Balisson 15'	Report		Stadium: Old Peter Mokaba Stadium; Referee: Hélder Martins De Carvalho (Angola)

30 May 2018 2018 COSAFA Cup	Angola	1–0	Mauritius	Polokwane, South Africa
19:00 MUT	Vincent 63' (o.g.)	Report		Stadium: Old Peter Mokaba Stadium; Referee: Nomore Musundire (Zimbabwe)

1 June 2018 2018 COSAFA Cup	Botswana	6–0	Mauritius	Polokwane, South Africa
19:30 MUT	Makgantai 3', 70'; Phiri 16'; Kgamanyane 20'; Seakanyeng 27'; Maikano 55'	Report		Stadium: Old Peter Mokaba Stadium; Referee: Jackson Pavaza (Namibia)

7 September 2018 Friendly	Singapore	1–1	Mauritius	Bishan, Singapore
15:30 MUT	Ikhsan 74'	Report	Justin 5'	Stadium: Bishan Stadium; Referee: Muhammad Taqi Aljaafari Bin Jahari (Singapore)

11 September 2018 Friendly	Indonesia	1–0	Mauritius	Cikarang, Indonesia
13:30 MUT	Dimas 89'	Report		Stadium: Wibawa Mukti Stadium; Attendance: 12,621; Referee: Minoru Tōjō (Japan)

== 2019 ==
21 March 2019 Friendly	New Caledonia	1–3	Mauritius	Lautoka, Fiji
15:30 MUT	Kayara 27' (pen.)	Report	François 58'; Perticots 65'; Nazira 78'	Stadium: Churchill Park; Referee: Salesh Chand (Fiji)

24 March 2019 Friendly	Fiji	1–0	Mauritius	Lautoka, Fiji
15:30 MUT	Krishna 59'	Report		Stadium: Churchill Park; Referee: Joel Hopken (Vanuatu)

25 May 2019 2019 COSAFA Cup	Eswatini	2–2	Mauritius	Umlazi, South Africa
18:30 MUT	Mamba 30'; Badenhorst 73'	Report	Nazira 28', 69'	Stadium: King Zwelithini Stadium; Referee: Celso Alvação (Mozambique)

29 May 2019 2019 COSAFA Cup	Comoros	2–1	Mauritius	Umlazi, South Africa
19:30 MUT	I. Youssouf 47'; I. Soulaimana 65'	Report	Nazira 53'	Stadium: King Zwelithini Stadium; Referee: Eugene Salas Mdluli (South Africa)

29 July 2019 2020 CHANQ	Mauritius	0–4	Zimbabwe	Flacq, Mauritius
12:00 MUT		Report	Masuku 19'; Mavunga 44', 87'; Tigere 68'	Stadium: Stade Auguste Vollaire; Referee: Lebalang Martin Mokete (Lesotho)

4 August 2019 2020 CHANQ	Zimbabwe	3–1 (7–1 agg.)	Mauritius	Bulawayo, Zimbabwe
17:00 MUT	Dube 15', 67', 83'	Report	A. Aristide 3'	Stadium: Barbourfields Stadium; Referee: Audrick Nkole (Zambia)

4 September 2019 2022 WCQ	Mauritius	0–1	Mozambique	Belle Vue Harel, Mauritius
18:30 MUT		Report	Telinho 10'	Stadium: Stade Anjalay; Referee: Georges Gatogato (Burundi)

10 September 2019 2022 WCQ	Mozambique	2–0 (3–0 agg.)	Mauritius	Maputo, Mozambique
18:00 MUT	Clésio 6'; Catamo 77' (pen.)	Report		Stadium: Estádio do Zimpeto; Referee: Brian Miiro (Uganda)

9 October 2019 2021 AFCONQ	Mauritius	1–3	São Tomé and Príncipe	Belle Vue Harel, Mauritius
17:00 MUT	Perticots 40'		Leal 45', 60'; Silva 65'	Stadium: Anjalay Stadium; Referee: Ibrahim Tsimanohitsy (Madagascar)

13 October 2019 2021 AFCONQ	São Tomé and Príncipe	2–1 (5–2 agg.)	Mauritius	São Tomé, São Tomé and Príncipe
20:00 MUT	Barbeiro 11'; Leal 27'		Nazira 45' (pen.)	Stadium: Estádio Nacional 12 de Julho; Referee: Prince Arcy Dongombe (Central African Republic)
