= Football at the 2019 Indian Ocean Island Games – Men's tournament =

2019 Men's Indian Ocean Island Games Football Tournament
Tournament details
- Host country: Mauritius
- Dates: 18–28 July 2019 (10 days)
- Teams: 7 (from 2 confederations)
- Venues: 2 (in 2 host cities)

Final positions
- Champions: Réunion (5th title)
- Runners-up: Mauritius
- Third place: Mayotte
- Fourth place: Seychelles

Tournament statistics
- Matches played: 13
- Goals scored: 30 (2.31 per match)
- Top scorer(s): (Mayotte) Moudoihir Ben Yahaya (Réunion) Jean-Michel Fontaine (3 goals each)

The men's association football tournament at the 2019 Indian Ocean Island Games (French: Jeux des îles de l'océan Indien 2019) was held in Mauritius.

The tournament was won by Réunion, who defeated the hosts Mauritius in the final after a penalty shootout.

== Teams ==
- Comoros
- Madagascar
- Maldives
- Mauritius
- Mayotte
- Réunion
- Seychelles

== Officials ==
The following officials were announced to officiate for the tournament.

Referees

- (Comoros) Mohamed Athoumani
- (Madagascar) Njaka Raharimanantsoa
- (Maldives) Adam Fazeel
- (Mauritius) Imtehaz Heeralall
- (Mauritius) Patrice Milazar
- (Mayotte) Zachari Youssaffa
- (Réunion) Jean Fabrice Commandant

Assistant Referees

- (Comoros) Azilani Abdoulmadjid
- (Comoros) Said Omar Chebli
- (Madagascar) Dimbiniaina Andriatianarivelo
- (Madagascar) Danisson Ravelomandimby
- (Maldives) Jaufar Rasheed
- (Mauritius) Fabien Cauvelet
- (Mauritius) Shailesh Gobin
- (Mauritius) Jeff Pithia
- (Mauritius) Akhtar Nawaz Rossaye
- (Seychelles) Eldrick Adelaide
- (Réunion) Vincent Drole

== Group stage ==
=== Group A ===
Pos	Team	Pld	W	D	L	GF	GA	GD	Pts	Qualification
1	Mauritius (H)	2	0	2	0	2	2	0	2	Advance to knockout stage
2	Seychelles	2	0	2	0	1	1	0	2	Advance to knockout stage
3	Madagascar	2	0	2	0	1	1	0	2	

Source: IOCS
(H) Hosts
18 July 2019
15:15

Mauritius	1–1	Seychelles
Nazira 3'	Report	Bibi 68'

Stade George V, Curepipe
Referee: Mohamed Athoumani (Comoros)
20 July 2019
15:15

Seychelles	0–0	Madagascar
	Report

Stade Auguste Vollaire, Centre de Flacq
Referee: Adam Fazeel (Maldives)
22 July 2019
12:00

Mauritius	1–1	Madagascar
Nazira 59'	Report	Randriamanjaka 43'

Stade George V, Curepipe
Referee: Jean Fabrice Commandant (Réunion)

=== Group B ===
Pos	Team	Pld	W	D	L	GF	GA	GD	Pts	Qualification
1	Réunion	3	2	0	1	5	1	+4	6	Advance to knockout stage
2	Mayotte	3	2	0	1	5	2	+3	6	Advance to knockout stage
3	Comoros	3	2	0	1	4	2	+2	6	
4	Maldives	3	0	0	3	1	10	−9	0	

Source: IOCS
18 July 2019
12:00

Réunion	4–0	Maldives
Vardapin 29'; Fontaine 32', 68'; Sarpédon 60'	Report

Stade Auguste Vollaire, Centre de Flacq
Referee: Njaka Raharimanantsoa (Madagascar)
18 July 2019
15:15

Comoros	0–2	Mayotte
	Report	Kamal 50' (pen.); Ali 83'

Stade Auguste Vollaire, Centre de Flacq
Referee: Imtehaz Heeralall (Mauritius)
20 July 2019
12:00

Réunion	1–0	Mayotte
Assoumani 77'	Report

Stade George V, Curepipe
Referee: Imtehaz Heeralall (Mauritius)
20 July 2019
15:15

Comoros	3–0	Maldives
Djoudja 29'; Issa 38'; Soulaimana 45'	Report

Stade George V, Curepipe
Referee: Patrice Milazar (Mauritius)
22 July 2019
12:00

Mayotte	3–1	Maldives
Maoulida 14'; Ben Yahaya 26'; Houmadi 56'	Report	Naim 22'

Stade Auguste Vollaire, Centre de Flacq
Referee: Njaka Raharimanantsoa (Madagascar)
22 July 2019
15:15

Réunion	0–1	Comoros
	Report	M'Changama 90+2'

Stade George V, Curepipe
Referee: Imtehaz Heeralall (Mauritius)

== Knockout stage ==
=== Bracket ===
Semi-finals
24 July – Centre de Flacq
Mauritius (a.e.t.)	1
Mayotte	0
24 July – Centre de Flacq
Réunion	4
Seychelles	0

Final
28 July – Centre de Flacq
Mauritius	1 (0)
Réunion (p)	1 (1)
Third place
26 July – Centre de Flacq
Seychelles	1
Mayotte	3

=== Semi-finals ===
24 July 2019
14:30

Mauritius	1–0 (a.e.t.)	Mayotte
Perticots 117' (pen.)	Report

Stade George V, Curepipe
Referee: Adam Fazeel (Maldives)
24 July 2019
14:30

Réunion	4–0	Seychelles
Damour 17'; Rivière 42'; Philéas 46'; Loricourt 63'	Report

Stade Auguste Vollaire, Centre de Flacq
Referee: Mohamed Athoumani (Comoros)

=== Third-place match (bronze medal) ===
26 July 2019
14:30

Seychelles	1–3	Mayotte
Damoo 34'	Report	Rasolofo 22'; Ben Yahaya 74', 83'

Stade Auguste Vollaire, Centre de Flacq
Referee: Jean Fabrice Commandant (Réunion)

=== Final (gold medal) ===
28 July 2019
12:00

Mauritius	1–1 (a.e.t.)	Réunion
François 70'	Report	Fontaine 45+1'
Penalties
Jocelyn (penalty missed); Vincent (penalty missed); Perticots (penalty missed); Brasse (penalty missed); Dorza (penalty missed)	0–1	(penalty missed) Fontaine; (penalty missed) Vardapin; (penalty missed) Boulaque; (penalty missed) Guichard; (penalty scored) Bador

Stade Auguste Vollaire, Centre de Flacq
Referee: Mohamed Athoumani (Comoros)

== Medalists ==
Event	Gold	Silver	Bronze
Men	Réunion; Akbar Assoumani; Bertrand Bador; Thomas Alpou Boulaque; Jonathan Boyer; Joé Damour; Mickaël Dubaril; Jean-Michel Fontaine; Yoann Guichard; Florent Ichiza; Karim Imira; Sebastien K'Bidi; Alexandre Loricourt; Ronan Nédélec; Grégory Pausé; Mathieu Pélops; Sylvain Philéas; Loïc Rivière; Thomas Souévamanien; Anjy Vardapin	Mauritius; Kerlson Agathe; Jean-Fabrice Augustin; Adrien Botlar; Samuel Brasse; Christopher Caserne; Marco Dorza; Adrien François; Clarel Jackson; Kevin Jean-Louis; Mervyn Jocelyn; Stéphane Nabab; Ashley Nazira; Désiré Patate; Kevin Perticots; Francis Rasolofonirina; Luther Rose; Jason Selmour; Jonathan Spéville; Walter St. Martin; Emmanuel Vincent	Mayotte; Raffion Abdou Said; Ansar Ahamada; Faissoil Ahmed; Abdallah Ali Abdoul Hamid; Hanafi Attoumani; Moudoihir Ben Yahaya; Houssame Boinali; Laurent Garcia; Adifane Hamada Noussoura; Mouritaza Houmadi; Ben Djadid Dina Kamal; Antoissi Loutoufi; Mouhtar Madi Ali; Habib Maoulida; El Yanour Mcolo; Antoine Rasolofo; Souffou Ridjali; Mickaël Salim

== Goalscorers ==
There were 30 goals scored in 13 matches, for an average of 2.31 goals per match.

3 goals

- (Mayotte) Moudoihir Ben Yahaya
- (Réunion) Jean-Michel Fontaine

2 goals

- (Mauritius) Ashley Nazira

1 goal

- (Comoros) Ibroihim Djoudja
- (Comoros) Nazarali Issa
- (Comoros) Mahamoud M'Changama
- (Comoros) Malaga Soulaimana
- (Madagascar) Colin Bibi
- (Maldives) Mohamed Naim
- (Mauritius) Adrien François
- (Mauritius) Kevin Perticots
- (Mayotte) Mouhtar Madi Ali
- (Mayotte) Mouritaza Houmadi
- (Mayotte) Ben Djadid Kamal
- (Mayotte) Habib Maoulida
- (Mayotte) Antoine Rasolofo
- (Réunion) Akbar Assoumani
- (Réunion) Joé Damour
- (Réunion) Alexandre Loricourt
- (Réunion) Sylvain Philéas
- (Réunion) Loïc Rivière
- (Réunion) Mathieu Sarpédon
- (Réunion) Anjy Vardapin
- (Seychelles) Darrel Damoo
- (Seychelles) Rhino Randriamanjaka
