= Lanto =

Lanto may refer to:

- Elin Lanto (born 1984), Swedish singer
- Evelyn Lanto, also known as Carrie Keranen
- Lanto Griffin (born 1988), American golfer
- Lanto Rambeasimbola, also known as Augustin Rabeasimbola
- Lanto Sheridan (born 1988), British polo player
- Hajanirina Lanto Ramaherijaona, Malagasy politician

== See also ==
- Lantos
- Lantto
