= Football at the 2011 Indian Ocean Island Games =

2011 Football at the Indian Ocean Island Games
Jeux des îles de l'océan Indien

Tournament details
- Host country: Seychelles
- City: Victoria
- Dates: 4–13 August 2011
- Teams: 7 (from 2 confederations)
- Venues: 2 (in 2 host cities)

Final positions
- Champions: Seychelles (1st title)
- Runners-up: Mauritius
- Third place: Réunion
- Fourth place: Mayotte

Tournament statistics
- Matches played: 13
- Goals scored: 30 (2.31 per match)
- Top scorer: (Mauritius) Fabrice Pithia (3 goals)

The men's association football tournament at the 2011 Indian Ocean Island Games (French: Jeux des îles de l'océan Indien 2011) was held in Seychelles. The draw for the football tournament was made in February 2011.

== Teams ==
- Comoros
- Madagascar
- Maldives
- Mauritius
- Mayotte
- Réunion
- Seychelles

== Match officials ==
- Comoros
  - Ali Adelaïd
    Assistant referees: Mmadi Fassoil, Abdoul Wahid Nafoundine
- Madagascar
  - Jean-Pierre Rakotonjanahary
    Assistant referees: Jean Thierry Djaonirina, Eli Jean Aina Rakotoson
- Maldives
  - Ali Saleem
- Mauritius
  - Rajindraparsad Seechurn
    Assistant referees: Balkrishna Bootun, Vivian Vally
- Mayotte
  - Harouna Rassuhi
    Assistant referees: Ali Inraki, Abdallah Mirhani
- Réunion
  - Steeve Dubec
    Assistant referees: Thierry Guichard, Julien Sindraye
- Seychelles
  - Bernard Camille
    Assistant referees: Steve Marie, Percy Walter Underwood

== Venues ==
Locations of the Stadiums for the 2011 Indian Ocean Island Games

Stadium	Surface type	Location	Stadium capacity
Stade d'Amitié	Artificial turf	Praslin	1,800
Stade Linité	Natural grass	Roche Caïman, Mahé	10,000

== Squads ==
Each association presented a list of at most twenty players to compete in the tournament.

== Group stage ==
=== Group A ===
Pos	Team	Pld	W	D	L	GF	GA	GD	Pts	Qualification
1	Seychelles (H)	3	2	1	0	7	2	+5	7	Advance to knockout stage
2	Mauritius	3	1	1	1	4	3	+1	4	Advance to knockout stage
3	Comoros	3	0	2	1	2	4	−2	2	
4	Maldives	3	0	2	1	4	8	−4	2	

Source: IOCS
Rules for classification: Tie-breaking criteria
(H) Hosts
4 August 2011
14:00 UTC+4

Seychelles	0–0	Comoros
	Report

Stade d'Amitié, Praslin
Attendance: 1,800
Referee: (Réunion) Steeve Dubec

4 August 2011
16:45 UTC+4

Maldives	1–1	Mauritius
Shafiu 32'	Report	Pithia 9'

Stade d'Amitié, Praslin
Attendance: 1,800
Referee: (Madagascar) Jean-Pierre Rakotonjanahary

6 August 2011
16:30 UTC+4

Seychelles	2–1	Mauritius
Laurence 1'; Henriette 28'	Report	Pithia 77'

Stade Linité, Roche Caïman, Mahé
Attendance: 6,500
Referee: (Mayotte) Harouna Rassuhi

6 August 2011
19:00 UTC+4

Comoros	2–2	Maldives
Madîhali 9'; Soulaimane 54'	Report	Thoriq 4'; Fazeel 45' (pen.)

Stade Linité, Roche Caïman, Mahé
Attendance: 1,000
Referee: (Réunion) Steeve Dubec

9 August 2011
18:00 UTC+4

Mauritius	2–0	Comoros
Pithia 35'; Calambé 87'	Report

Stade d'Amitié, Praslin
Attendance: 300
Referee: (Mayotte) Harouna Rassuhi

9 August 2011
18:00 UTC+4

Seychelles	5–1	Maldives
Laurence 16'; Anacoura 23'; Henriette 62'; Baldé 75', 80'	Report	Qasim 26'

Stade Linité, Roche Caïman, Mahé
Attendance: 5,500
Referee: (Madagascar) Jean-Pierre Rakotonjanahary

=== Group B ===
Pos	Team	Pld	W	D	L	GF	GA	GD	Pts	Qualification
1	Mayotte	2	1	1	0	3	1	+2	4	Advance to knockout stage
2	Réunion	2	1	0	1	2	3	−1	3	Advance to knockout stage
3	Madagascar	2	0	1	1	2	3	−1	1	

Source: IOCS
Rules for classification: Tie-breaking criteria
4 August 2011
19:30 UTC+4

Madagascar	1–1	Mayotte
Rajoarimanana 36'	Report	Soihirin 42'

Stade d'Amitié, Praslin
Attendance: 1,800
Referee: (Seychelles) Bernard Camille

6 August 2011
14:00 UTC+4

Réunion	2–1	Madagascar
Diallo 50'; Farro 81'	Report	Rajoarimanana 22'

Stade Linité, Roche Caïman, Mahé
Attendance: 1,000
Referee: (Mauritius) Rajindraparsad Seechurn

8 August 2011
16:00 UTC+4

Mayotte	2–0	Réunion
Yazidou 56'; Antoissi 78'	Report

Stade Linité, Roche Caïman, Mahé
Attendance: 1,000
Referee: (Comoros) Ali Adelaïd

== Knockout stage ==
Semi-finals
11 August – Stade Linité
Seychelles	2
Réunion	1
11 August – Stade Linité
Mayotte	0 (4)
Mauritius	0 (5)

Final
13 August – Stade Linité
Seychelles	1 (4)
Mauritius	1 (3)
Third place
13 August – Stade Linité
Réunion	1
Mayotte	0

=== Semi-finals ===
11 August 2011
15:00 UTC+4

Seychelles	2–1 (a.e.t.)	Réunion
Nibourette 77'; Hall 118'	Report	64' Farro

Stade Linité, Roche Caïman, Mahé
Attendance: 6,500
Referee: (Maldives) Ali Saleem

11 August 2011
18:30 UTC+4

Mayotte	0–0 (a.e.t.)	Mauritius
	Report
Penalties
Mihidjai (penalty scored); Souffou (penalty missed); Rasolofonirina (penalty scored); Ben-Hamadi (penalty scored); Djadid (penalty scored)	4–5	(penalty scored) Veeranah; (penalty scored) Cundasamy; (penalty scored) Sophie; (penalty scored) Ravina; (penalty scored) Bell

Stade Linité, Roche Caïman, Mahé
Attendance: 2,500
Referee: (Comoros) Ali Adelaïd

=== Third place game ===
13 August 2011
15:00 UTC+4

Réunion	1–0	Mayotte
El Madaghri 74'	Report

Stade Linité, Roche Caïman, Mahé
Attendance: 3,000
Referee: (Madagascar) Jean-Pierre Rakotonjanahary

=== Final ===
13 August 2011
17:30 UTC+4

Seychelles	1–1	Mauritius
Betsy 16'	Report	62' Louis
Penalties
Betsy (penalty scored); Henriette (penalty scored); Bibi (penalty missed); Nibourette (penalty scored); Anacoura (penalty scored)	4 – 3	(penalty missed) Veeranah; (penalty scored) Cundasamy; (penalty scored) Sophie; (penalty scored) Bru; (penalty missed) Bell

Stade Linité, Roche Caïman, Mahé
Attendance: 10,000
Referee: (Réunion) Steeve Dubec

== Medalists ==
Event	Gold	Silver	Bronze
Men's football	Seychelles	Mauritius	Réunion

== Final ranking ==
Pos	Team	Pld	W	D	L	GF	GA	GD	Pts	Final result
1	Seychelles (H)	5	3	2	0	10	4	+6	11	Champions
2	Mauritius	5	1	3	1	5	4	+1	6	Runners-up
3	Réunion	4	2	0	2	4	5	−1	6	Third place
4	Mayotte	4	1	2	1	3	2	+1	5	Fourth place
5	Comoros	3	0	2	1	2	4	−2	2	Eliminated in Group stage
6	Maldives	3	0	2	1	4	8	−4	2	Eliminated in Group stage
7	Madagascar	2	0	1	1	2	3	−1	1	Eliminated in Group stage

Source: IOCS
(H) Hosts

Per statistical convention in football, matches decided in extra time are counted as wins and losses, while matches decided by penalty shoot-out are counted as draws.

== Statistics ==
=== Goal scorers ===
3 goals

- (Mauritius) Fabrice Pithia

2 goals

- (Madagascar) Yvan Rajoarimanana
- (Réunion) Éric Farro
- (Seychelles) Alpha Baldé
- (Seychelles) Archille Henriette
- (Seychelles) Nelson Laurence

1 goal

- (Comoros) Ibrahim Madîhali
- (Comoros) Athoumane Soulaimane
- (Maldives) Mohamed Arif
- (Maldives) Ibrahim Fazeel
- (Maldives) Shamweel Qasim
- (Maldives) Ahmed Thoriq
- (Mauritius) Gurty Calambé
- (Mauritius) Jerry Louis
- (Mayotte) Abdou Lihariti Antoissi
- (Mayotte) Assani Soihirin
- (Mayotte) Saïd Yazidou
- (Réunion) Mamoudou Diallo
- (Réunion) Mohamed El Madaghri
- (Seychelles) Don Anacoura
- (Seychelles) Kevin Betsy
- (Seychelles) Karl Hall
- (Seychelles) Alex Nibourette

== See also ==
- Indian Ocean Island Games
- Football at the Indian Ocean Island Games
