= Andry =

Andry is a given name and surname. Notable people with the name include:

== Given name ==
- Andry Rajoelina (born 1974), Malagasy politician and businessman
- Andry Laffita (born 1978), Cuban boxer
- Andry Lara (born 2003), Venezuelan baseball player
- Andry Lalaina Rakotozanany (born 1983), Malagasy footballer
- Andry Nalin (born 1969), German music producer

== Surname ==
- Nicolas Andry (1658–1742), French physician and writer
- Peter Andry (1927–2010), classical record producer and recording industry executive
- Katrina Andry (born 1981), American visual artist and printmaker
