= Boto (disambiguation) =

Boto is a Portuguese name for several types of dolphins.

Boto may also refer to:

== People ==
- Catarina Boto (born c. 1992), a contestant on Idolos season 3, a Portuguese reality television show based on the British show Pop Idol
- Eva Boto (born 1995), Slovenian singer
- Eza Boto, a pen name of Mongo Beti (1932–2001), Cameroonian author and polemicist
- José Boto (born 1966), Portuguese association football sporting director
- Kari Boto (1954–2007), BBC reporter and senior executive
- Kenji-Van Boto (born 1996), French footballer
- Leonardo Boto (born 1970), Argentine politician and tourism executive
- Martha Boto (1925–2004), Argentine artist
- Boto Fagnorena (born 1985), Malagasy former footballer
- Boto people of Ladakh, Jammu and Kashmir, India

== Other uses ==
- Boto, Burkina Faso, a commune in Kouritenga Province
- Bøtø, an island about 12,000 years ago, now silted up - see Marielyst, Denmark
- Boto, a variety of the Zari language of Nigeria
- Boto, a legendary creature
- "Boto", a track from the 1995 album Double Rainbow: The Music of Antonio Carlos Jobim by jazz saxophonist Joe Henderson
- "Boto", a track from the 2014 album Metal Folclore: The Zoeira Never Ends... by Detonator e as Musas do Metal

== See also ==
- Botos (disambiguation)
