= Jean Augustin =

Jean Augustin or Jean-Augustin might refer to:

- Jean-Fabrice Augustin (fl. 2010s), Mauritian footballer
- Jean-Kévin Augustin (born 1997), French footballer
- Jean Augustin Daiwaille (1786–1850), Dutch portrait painter
- Jean-Marc Augustin (born 1965), French boxer

== See also ==
- Jean Augustine (born 1937), Grenada-born Canadian politician
