= Johan Candassamy =

Mauritian football player

Personal information
- Full name: Johan Candassamy
- Date of birth: June 21, 1982 (age 44)
- Place of birth: Mauritius
- Position: Defender

Team information
- Current team: Curepipe Starlight SC
- Number: 3

Senior career*
Years	Team	Apps	(Gls)
2008–	Curepipe Starlight SC	-	(-)

International career
2008–	Mauritius	7	(0)
- * Club domestic league appearances and goals

Johan Candassamy (born June 21, 1982) is a Mauritian football player who currently plays for Curepipe Starlight SC in the Mauritian Premier League and for the Mauritius national football team as a defender. He is featured on the Mauritian national team in the official 2010 FIFA World Cup video game.
