= Botos =

Botos may refer to:

== People ==
- András Botos (born 1952), Hungarian retired boxer
- Giannis Fivos Botos (born 2000), Greek footballer
- Katalin Botos (born 1941), Hungarian economist, university professor, and former minister without portfolio in charge of banking affairs
- Robi Botos (born 1978), Hungarian-Canadian jazz pianist
- Vlad Botoș, Romanian politician, Member of the European Parliament (2020–2024)

== Places ==
- Botoș, a village in Ciocănești, Suceava, Romania
- Botoš, a village in Zrenjanin municipality, Central Banat District, Serbia
- Lake Botos, Poás Volcano National Park, Alajuela province, Costa Rica

== See also ==
- Boto (disambiguation)
