= Mikaël Mitraille =

Mauritian footballer

Personal information
- Full name: Mikaël Mitraille
- Place of birth: Mauritius
- Position: Forward

Team information
- Current team: Curepipe Starlight SC

Senior career*
Years	Team	Apps	(Gls)
2007–2008	Étoile de l'Ouest Bambous		
2008–2010	Savanne SC		
2010–	Curepipe Starlight SC		

International career
2008–	Mauritius	2	(0)
- * Club domestic league appearances and goals

Mikaël Mitraille is a Mauritian footballer.

== Career ==
A forward, Mitraille currently plays at the club level for Curepipe Starlight SC in the Mauritian Premier League. He is also a member of the Mauritius national football team.

In addition, Mitraille is also featured on the Mauritian national team in the official 2010 FIFA World Cup video game.
