= Sopha =

Sopha may refer to:

== People ==
- Elmer Sopha (1924–1982), Canadian politician from Ontario
- Eric Nelson Sopha (born in 1974), Seychellois footballer
- Sirichok Sopha (born in 1967), Thai politician

== First name ==
- Sopha Saysana (born in 1992), Laotian footballer

== Others ==
- Namtok Kaeng Sopha, waterfall in Phitsanulok Province, Thailand
- Kaeng Sopha, subdistrict in Phitsanulok Province, Thailand
