= Fabrice Pauline =

Mauritian footballer

Personal information
- Full name: Fabrice Pauline
- Date of birth: December 5, 1982 (age 43)
- Place of birth: Mauritius
- Position: Midfielder

Team information
- Current team: Curepipe Starlight SC

Senior career*
Years	Team	Apps	(Gls)
2006–	Curepipe Starlight SC		

International career
2005–	Mauritius	12	(0)
- * Club domestic league appearances and goals

Fabrice Pauline (born December 5, 1982) is a Mauritian football player who currently plays for Curepipe Starlight SC in the Mauritian Premier League and for the Mauritius national football team as a midfielder. He is featured on the Mauritian national team in the official 2010 FIFA World Cup video game.
