= Sewraj Dawochand =

Mauritian football player

Personal information
- Full name: Sewraj Dawochand
- Date of birth: September 4, 1981 (age 45)
- Place of birth: Mauritius
- Position: Midfielder

Team information
- Current team: Curepipe Starlight SC

Senior career*
Years	Team	Apps	(Gls)
2006–2008	Olympique de Moka	-	(-)
2008–2009	US Beau Bassin/Rose Hill	-	(-)
2009–	Curepipe Starlight SC	-	(-)

International career
2007–	Mauritius	7	(0)
- * Club domestic league appearances and goals

Sewraj Dawochand (born September 4, 1981) is a Mauritian football player who currently plays for Curepipe Starlight SC in the Mauritian Premier League and for the Mauritius national football team as a midfielder. He is featured on the Mauritian national team in the official 2010 FIFA World Cup video game.
