= Roche Caiman Power Station =

Diesel-fuelled power plant in Roche Caiman, Mahé, Seychelles

- Official name: Victoria C Power Station
- Country: Seychelles
- Location: Roche Caiman, Mahé
- Coordinates: 4.632283°S 55.466402°E
- Status: Operational
- Commission date: 2015
- Owners: Public Utilities Corporation, Government of Seychelles

Thermal power station
- Primary fuel: Diesel

Power generation
- Units operational: 4
- Nameplate capacity: 92 MW

Roche Caiman Power Station (also known as Victoria C Power Station) is a diesel-powered power station in Mahé, Seychelles.

== History ==
The power station was commissioned in 2015 with an installed generation capacity of 58 MW.

In October 2023, a 33kV underground transmission network project funded with $30.9 million by the Saudi Fund for Development and Arab Bank for Economic Development in Africa was commissioned. It involved setting up the network, starting from the power station and extending along the east coast of Mahé, from Providence to Turtle Bay. It also extends to Anse Boileau through Montagne Posee, as well as from Turtle Bay to Anse Boileau via Anse Royale and Quatre Bornes.

== Technical specifications ==
As of 2024, the power station has an installed generation capacity of 92 MW.

== See also ==
- Energy in Seychelles
