= Hector Kandy Rambelomasina =

Malagasy footballer

Personal information
- Date of birth: 17 February 1981 (age 45)
- Position: Goalkeeper

Senior career*
Years	Team	Apps	(Gls)
2003–2008	Ecoredipharm		
2009–2016	Japan Actuel's FC		

International career
2005–2011	Madagascar	5	(0)
- * Club domestic league appearances and goals

Hector Kandy Rambelomasina (born 17 February 1981) is a retired Malagasy football goalkeeper.
