= Nazarali Issa =

Comorian association football player

Personal information
- Full name: Nazarali Issa Ramadhani
- Date of birth: 19 November 1990 (age 35)
- Place of birth: Comoros
- Position: Forward

Senior career*
Years	Team	Apps	(Gls)
- Coin Nord de Mitsamiouli
- Cercle de Joachim SC
2016–20xx	SS Capricorne		
2017–	Trois Bassins FC		

International career
2008–2019	Comoros	5+	(1)
- * Club domestic league appearances and goals

Nazarali Issa (born 19 November 1990) is a Comorian footballer.

== Career ==
=== Mauritius ===
Achieving a transfer to Cercle de Joachim SC prior to spring 2013, Issa contributed a hat-trick as the Curepipiens eliminated AS Port-Louis 2000 from the 2013 Mauritian Cup.

=== Reunion ===
Putting four past AS 12ème Km at the 2016-17 Coupe de France with SS Capricorne, the Comorian stated that the style in Mauritius was less technical compared to Reunion. Pulling off a deal with Trois-Bassins a year later, he chalked up three goals in his first two fixtures, including a double to fell AS Saint-Louisienne 2-0 before bring up his tally to four in as many rounds. However, he picked dup an injury as November 2017 got underway.

=== International goals ===
Scores and results list the Comoros' goal tally first.

No.	Date	Venue	Opponent	Score	Result	Competition
1.	20 July 2019	Stade George V, Curepipe, Mauritius	Maldives	2–0	3–0	2019 Indian Ocean Island Games

== Personal life ==
His father dying on 29 July 2014, Comorian sports media blog eliedjouma.centerblog.net offered their commiserations to him as well as his family.
