= Edgard Nandrasana =

Malagasy footballer

Personal information
- Date of birth: 26 November 1981 (age 44)
- Height: 1.77 m (5 ft 10 in)
- Position: Midfielder

Senior career*
Years	Team	Apps	(Gls)
–2012	ASCUM		
2013–2012018	AS Adema		

International career
2011	Madagascar	6	(0)
- * Club domestic league appearances and goals

Edgard Nandrasana (born 26 November 1981) is a retired Malagasy football midfielder.
