= Léonard Besabotsy =

Malagasy footballer

Personal information
- Date of birth: 6 June 1993 (age 33)
- Place of birth: Vohémar, Madagascar
- Height: 1.85 m (6 ft 1 in)
- Position: Defender

Team information
- Current team: Foresters

Senior career*
Years	Team	Apps	(Gls)
2011–2014	AS Adema		
2015–2016	St Michel United FC		
2017–	Foresters		

International career
2011	Madagascar	2	(0)
- * Club domestic league appearances and goals

Léonard Besabotsy (born 6 June 1993) is a Malagasy footballer who plays as a defender for Foresters.
