= Les Mamelles =

Coordinates: 4°39′10″S 55°28′15″E

- District

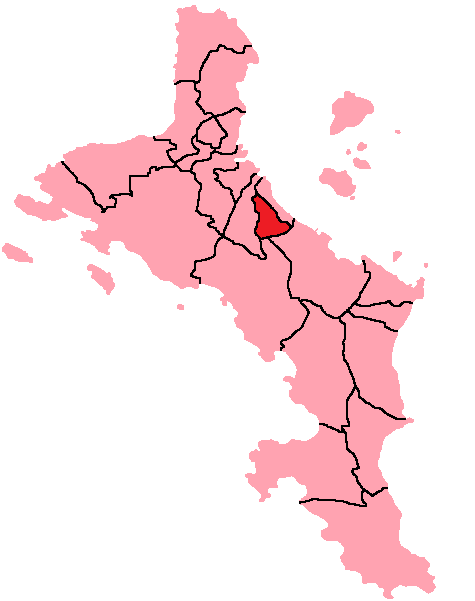
- Location within Mahé Island, Seychelles
- Country: Seychelles

Government
  - District Administrator: Doris Kiwale
  - Member of National Assembly: Hon. Bernard Georges (LDS)

Population (2019 Estimate)
  - Total: 2,720
- Time zone: Seychelles Time

Les Mamelles (French pronunciation: [le mamɛl]) is an administrative district of the Seychelles, located in the south of the Greater Victoria (suburban) area on Mahé, the main island of the archipelago. The district is located inward from the adjacent coastal district of Roche Caiman. It is not to be confused with Mamelles Island some 13 kilometers northeast of Mahé.

Les Mamelles District was created in 1998 mostly from reclaimed land and from parts of Plaisance district. Therefore, it does not yet have its own ISO 3166-2 code.
