= Colin Bibi =

Seychellois association football player

Personal information
- Full name: Colin Bibi
- Date of birth: 4 June 1995 (age 31)
- Place of birth: Seychelles
- Position: Midfielder

Team information
- Current team: La Passe FC

International career^{‡}
Years	Team	Apps	(Gls)
2016–	Seychelles	18	(1)
- ‡ National team caps and goals as of 20 July 2019

Colin Bibi (born June 4, 1995) is a Seychellois football player. He is a midfielder playing for La Passe FC and the Seychelles national football team. He has represented Seychelles in the AFCON 2018.

== International career ==
=== International goals ===
Scores and results list Seychelles' goal tally first.

No.	Date	Venue	Opponent	Score	Result	Competition
1.	18 July 2019	Stade George V, Curepipe, Mauritius	Mauritius	1–1	1–1	2019 Indian Ocean Island Games
