= Kevin Perticots =

Mauritian association football player

Personal information
- Full name: Joseph Stephan Kevin Perticots
- Date of birth: 1 May 1996 (age 30)
- Place of birth: Pointe-aux-Piments, Mauritius
- Position: Midfielder

Team information
- Current team: Pamplemousses
- Number: 19

Youth career
- Trou-aux-Biches Football School
- –2014: Pamplemousses
- 2014: Juventus

Senior career*
Years	Team	Apps	(Gls)
2014–	Pamplemousses		

International career^{‡}
- Mauritius U17
2015–	Mauritius	40	(6)
- * Club domestic league appearances and goals as of 15:55, 10 December 2019 (UTC) ‡ National team caps and goals as of 18:29, 10 December 2019 (UTC)

Joseph Stephan Kevin Perticots (born 1 May 1996), commonly known as Kevin Perticots, is a Mauritian international footballer who plays as a midfielder for Mauritian League side Pamplemousses SC and the Mauritius national football team.

== International career ==
Perticots made his senior international debut in a 2–0 COSAFA Cup defeat by Zimbabwe, coming on as a substitute for Christopher Bazerque. He scored his first goal against Madagascar; the third in a 3–1 victory to clinch third place at the 2015 Indian Ocean Island Games. He scored the winning goal in the semifinal at 116 minutes on penalty, helping his team to secure a place in the final of the 2019 Indian Ocean Island Games.

== International statistics ==
As of matches played 10 December 2019.

National team	Year	Apps	Goals
Mauritius	2015	11	1
Mauritius	2016	3	0
Mauritius	2017	13	2
Mauritius	2018	1	0
Mauritius	2019	12	3
Total		40	6

=== International goals ===
Scores and results list Mauritius' goal tally first.

No.	Date	Venue	Opponent	Score	Result	Competition
1.	7 August 2015	Stade Georges Lambrakis, Le Port, Réunion	Madagascar	3–0	3–1	2015 Indian Ocean Island Games
2.	29 June 2017	Moruleng Stadium, Moruleng, South Africa	Tanzania	1–0	1–1	2017 COSAFA Cup
3.	29 June 2017	Estádio 11 de Novembro, Luanda, Angola	Angola	1–1	2–3	2018 African Nations Championship qualification
4.	21 March 2019	Churchill Park, Lautoka, Fiji	New Caledonia	2–1	3–1	Friendly
5.	24 July 2019	Stade George V, Curepipe, Mauritius	Mayotte	1–0	1–0 (a.e.t.)	2019 Indian Ocean Island Games
6.	9 October 2019	Anjalay Stadium, Belle Vue Harel, Mauritius	São Tomé and Príncipe	1–0	1–3	2021 Africa Cup of Nations qualification
