= Damien Mahavony =

Malagasy footballer

Personal information
- Date of birth: December 15, 1985 (age 40)
- Place of birth: Madagascar
- Position: Midfielder

Team information
- Current team: Curepipe Starlight SC

Senior career*
| Years | Team | Apps | (Gls) |
| 2006–2007 | USCA Foot | | |
| 2008– 2013 | AS Adema | | |
| 2013– | Curepipe Starlight SC | | |

International career
| 2006–2012 | Madagascar | 10 | (0) |
- * Club domestic league appearances and goals

Damien Mahavony (born December 15, 1985) is a Malagasy footballer currently plays for Curepipe Starlight SC.
