= Jean Tholix =

Malagasy footballer

Personal information
- Date of birth: February 6, 1984 (age 42)
- Place of birth: Toamasina, Madagascar
- Height: 1.72 m (5 ft 8 in)
- Position: Left back

Youth career
- 2000–2003: Ajesaia
- 2004–2005: Egavi Ambohibary Sambaina

Senior career*
Years	Team	Apps	(Gls)
2006	USJF Ravinala	18	(0)
2007–2011	AS Adema	43	(2)
2012–2016	La Passe FC		
2017	Fosa Juniors FC		

International career
2006–2011	Madagascar	14	(0)
- * Club domestic league appearances and goals

Jean Tholix (born 6 February 1984 in Toamasina) is a retired Malagasy footballer. A left back, Thoilix was a member of the Madagascar national football team.
