= Katrina Andry =

American visual artist (born 1981)

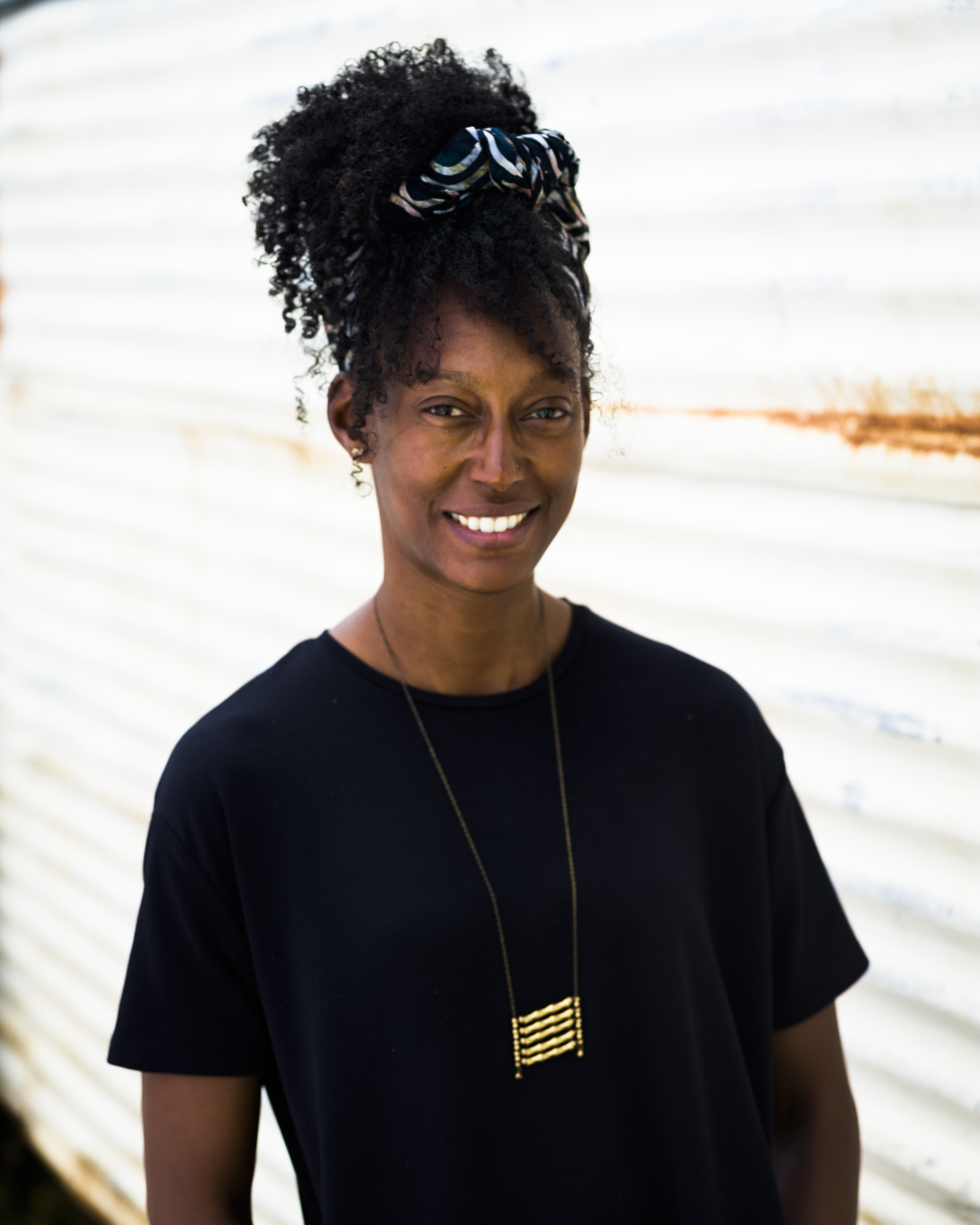
- Andry (2018)
- Born: 1981 (age 44–45); New Orleans, Louisiana, U.S.
- Education: Louisiana State University
- Known for: printmaking
- Website: http://www.katrina-andry.com/

Katrina Andry (born 1981) is an American visual artist and printmaker. She is based in New Orleans, Louisiana.

== Early life and education ==
Katrina Andry was born in New Orleans, Louisiana. Andry first studied graphic design at Louisiana State University and received her BFA in 2004. She then studied printmaking at Louisiana State University (LSU) in Baton Rouge, Louisiana, and received her MFA degree in 2010. While at school, Andry was inspired by artists such as Adrian Piper.

== Career ==
Andry has worked in New Orleans, as well as at Xavier University in Ohio. She uses color-reduction wood cut prints in small and large-scale prints. Some of her prints are almost five feet long in order to expose the view to degrading clichés. Andry's works never contain a specific person, but more of an ideal of certain groups of people. Her work is featured in multiple publications such as, New American Paintings, edition 118, Art in Print, and The Saratoga Collection.

Andry's work explores the negative effects stereotypes have on people of color. She is known for her large-scale, full-color woodblock prints. Her works feature white subjects in blackface, depicting negative cliches and caricatures of black culture. Through these depictions, Andry explores how stereotypes are perpetuated to benefit a majority while disenfranchising other groups of people. Andry challenges the majority social norms and questions how these norms affect how individuals see one another. She also uses non-people-of-color in her work to portray more than black culture. However, when Andry's works are seen as black culture, the stereotype-norms are emphasized. She typically uses white men to symbolize authority over people of color stereotypes. Andry shows this visually in her work by practicing large-scale color reduction in woodcut prints.

Andry was listed in the September, 2012 Art in Print magazine as one of the top 50 printmakers. She has recently shown at the Hammonds House Museum (solo), the Pensacola Museum of Art (solo), and the New Orleans Museum of Art. She has also been an artist-in-residence at Anchor Graphics in Chicago; Kala Art Institute in Berkeley, California; and the Joan Mitchell Center in New Orleans.

Andry's work has been exhibited at the Ogden Museum of Southern Art and Contemporary Arts Center, New Orleans. In 2016, Andry's work was included in the Atlanta Biennial at the Atlanta Contemporary Art Center alongside artists Coco Fusco, Skylar Fein, Harmony Korine, Kalup Linzy and Stacy Lynn Waddell.

== Recognition ==
Andry was identified in the Jan./Feb. 2012 issue of Art in Print as one of the top 50 printmakers. Andry has been awarded residencies from the Joan Mitchell Center of New Orleans, Anchor Graphics in Chicago, and the Kala Art Institute in Berkeley, California. In 2016, Andry received a grant from the Art Matters Foundation.

== Exhibitions ==
- 2008–2010: Stabbed in the Art, Bohemian Gallery, Baton Rouge, LA
- 2009: Business Casual, High Water Gallery
- 2009: Lock Down, Good Children Gallery
- 2009: Everything Must Go, Good Children Gallery
- 2009: First Wednesday, Baton Rouge Gallery
- 2009: BookOpolis, Bookworks
- 2010: Emerge, Ogden Museum of Southern Art
- 2010: Here and Now, Bricks and Bombs Gallery
- 2010: 12th Annual Venus Envy, Baton Rouge Gallery
- 2011: Instructions – Call and Response, Antenna Gallery
- 2011: Mahalia Jackson Tribute, Stella Jones Gallery
- 2011: What We Can Do, Antenna Gallery
- 2011: Black Art Now, M Francis Gallery
- 2012: Otherness and American Values, Staple Goods
- 2012: Geographica, DuMois Gallery
- 2012: Nola Now, Contemporary Arts Center, New Orleans
- 2012: Heavy Hitters, Peveto Gallery
- 2013: Visual Artist Network (VAN) Annual Show, Contemporary Arts Center, New Orleans
- 2013: Shape of Place, Staple Goods
- 2014: Together We Stare Out From the Shadows; Hiding From Their Prejudiced Stares, Isaac Delgado Fine Arts Gallery – Delgado Community College
- 2015: Indecent Intentions Leave Me Vulnerable and Voiceless, Staple Goods
- 2015: Initiating Cause and Effect, Jonathan Ferrara Gallery
- 2016: Atlanta Biennial, The Atlanta Contemporary Art Center
