= 2017 Tri-Nation Series (India) =

International football tournament

2017 Hero Tri-Nation Series

Tournament details
- Host country: India
- Dates: 19–24 August 2017
- Teams: 3 (from 3 confederations)
- Venue(s): 1 (in 1 host city)

Final positions
- Champions: India (1st title)
- Runners-up: Saint Kitts and Nevis
- Third place: Mauritius

Tournament statistics
- Matches played: 3
- Goals scored: 7 (2.33 per match)
- Top scorer(s): 7 tied (1)

The 2017 Hero Tri-Nation Series was a 3-team association football tournament held at the Mumbai Football Arena in the Indian city of Mumbai between the 19th and 24th of August 2017. It was first edition of The Tri-Nation Series organized by the AIFF. It was first introduced as part of the senior men team's preparation for the third round of 2019 AFC Asian Cup qualification matches. The tournament naming rights were purchased by Hero MotoCorp which also sponsors the national team. The tournament received criticism from at least one media outlet, citing that the ₹3.7cr spent to organize the tournament was significantly more than the entire yearly budget for the women's national team. The tournament was originally scheduled to take place at the Jawaharlal Nehru Stadium in Chennai but was changed the week before the tournament because of financial disagreements with the stadium's operators. India Head coach Stephen Constantine revealed that the intention was to hold a 4-team tournament with India competing against teams from the Caribbean, Africa, and Asia. However another Asian team did not participate. India won the tournament with a 1–1 draw with Saint Kitts and Nevis on the final matchday.

== Participating nations ==
With FIFA Rankings, as of August 10, 2017

- India (97)
- Saint Kitts and Nevis (125)
- Mauritius (160)

== Venue ==
- All matches held at the Mumbai Football Arena, Mumbai, India.

Mumbai	2017 Tri-Nation Series (India) is located in India
Mumbai Football Arena	2017 Tri-Nation Series (India) is located in India
19°07′23.2″N 72°50′12.8″E	2017 Tri-Nation Series (India) is located in India
Capacity: 6,600 seats	2017 Tri-Nation Series (India) is located in India

== Standings ==
Pos	Team	Pld	W	D	L	GF	GA	GD	Pts	
1	India (C)	2	1	1	0	3	2	+1	4	Champion
2	Saint Kitts and Nevis	2	0	2	0	2	2	0	2	
3	Mauritius	2	0	1	1	2	3	−1	1	

(C) Champions

== Matches ==
19 August 2017
8:00pm

India	2–1	Mauritius
R. Singh 37'; B. Singh 62'	Report	Jocelyn 15'

Mumbai Football Arena, Mumbai, India
Referee: Hettikamkanamge Dilan Perera (Sri Lanka)

22 August 2017
5:30pm

Saint Kitts and Nevis	1–1	Mauritius
Rogers 87'	Report	Sarah 19'

Mumbai Football Arena, Mumbai, India
Referee: C. R. Srikrishna (India)

24 August 2017
8:00pm

India	1–1	Saint Kitts and Nevis
J. Singh 38'	Report	Amory 72'

Mumbai Football Arena, Mumbai, India
Referee: Hettikamkanamge Dilan Perera (Sri Lanka)

== Winners ==
2017 Tri-Nation Series champion

India
First title

== Goalscorers ==
1 goal

- (India) Balwant Singh
- (India) Jackichand Singh
- (India) Robin Singh
- (Mauritius) Mervyn Jocelyn
- (Mauritius) Jean Frederic Sarah
- (Saint Kitts and Nevis) G'Vaune Amory
- (Saint Kitts and Nevis) Kimaree Rogers
