= Malaga Soulaimana =

Comorian footballer

Personal information
- Full name: Malaga Soulaimana
- Date of birth: April 5, 1989 (age 37)
- Place of birth: Comoros
- Position: Defender

Team information
- Current team: Fomboni
- Number: 14

Senior career*
| Years | Team | Apps | (Gls) |
- Fomboni

International career^{‡}
| 2017– | Comoros | 6 | (1) |
- * Club domestic league appearances and goals as of 30 June 2018 ‡ National team caps and goals as of 30 June 2018

Malaga Soulaimana (born 5 April 1989) is a Comorian professional footballer who plays as a defender for the Comorian club Fomboni FC.

Soulaimana made his international debut for the Comoros national football team in a 2018 African Nations Championship qualification 2-0 win over Lesotho on 15 July 2017.

== International career ==
=== International goals ===
Scores and results list the Comoros' goal tally first.

| No. | Date | Venue | Opponent | Score | Result | Competition |
|---|---|---|---|---|---|---|
| 1. | 20 July 2019 | Stade George V, Curepipe, Mauritius | Maldives | 3–0 | 3–0 | 2019 Indian Ocean Island Games |
