= Yvan Rajoarimanana =

Malagasy footballer

Personal information
- Full name: Yvan Rajoarimanana Avotriniaina
- Date of birth: August 23, 1988 (age 38)
- Place of birth: Antananarivo, Madagascar
- Position: Striker

Team information
- Current team: CNaPS Sport

Youth career
- Ajesaia

Senior career*
Years	Team	Apps	(Gls)
2007	Ajesaia		
2008–2009	JS Saint-Pierroise		
2010	Fanilo Japan Actuels		
2011–	CNaPS Sport Itasy		

International career
2008–2011	Madagascar	12	(4)
- * Club domestic league appearances and goals

Yvan Rajoarimanana Avotriniaina (born August 23, 1988) is a Malagasy footballer who currently plays CNaPS Sport.

== Career ==
Rajoarimanana started his football career with Ajesaia. He played one year with Ajessaia in the Ligue one before joined to JS Saint-Pierroise. Rajoarimanana played two years in the Réunion Premier League, before returned to Madagascar and signed with CNaPS Sport Itasy.

=== International ===
He was from 2008 to 2011 member of the Madagascar national football team and played twelve games for them.

=== International goals ===
Scores and results list Madagascar's goal tally first.

No.	Date	Venue	Opponent	Score	Result	Competition
1.	27 March 2011	Mahamasina Municipal Stadium, Antananarivo, Madagascar	Guinea	1–0	1–1	2012 Africa Cup of Nations qualification
2.	4 August 2011	Stade d’Amitié, Praslin, Seychelles	Mayotte	1–0	1–1	2011 Indian Ocean Island Games
3.	6 August 2011	Stade Linité, Victoria, Seychelles	Réunion	1–0	1–0	Friendly
4.	15 November 2011	Mahamasina Municipal Stadium, Antananarivo, Madagascar	Equatorial Guinea	1–1	2–1	2014 FIFA World Cup qualification

== Honours ==
=== Club ===
Ajesaia

- THB Champions League (1) : Champion : 2007
- Super Coupe de Madagascar (1) : 2007

JS Saint-Pierroise

- Réunion Premier League (2) : 2008,2015

CNaPS Sport

- THB Champions League (1): 2013
- Coupe de Madagascar (1): 2011

AS Saint-Michel Elgeco Plus

- Coupe de Madagascar (1): 2014

=== National team ===
- COSAFA CUP U20 (1) : COSAFA U-20 Challenge Cup 2005
