= Jonathan Justin =

Mauritian-French footballer (born 1991)

Personal information
- Full name: Jonathan Justin
- Date of birth: 27 February 1991 (age 35)
- Place of birth: Pereybèré, Mauritius
- Height: 6 ft 4 in (1.93 m)
- Position: Forward

Senior career*
Years	Team	Apps	(Gls)
2007	AS Auch Gascogne	–	(–)
2008	Rodez AF	–	(–)
2008–2009	Amiens SC	–	(–)
2009–2010	AS Auch Gascogne	27	(19)
2011	Etoile FC	5	(2)
2011–2012	US Castanet	19	(10)
2012–2013	Balma SC	28	(12)
2013–2014	US Colomiers	15	(6)
2014–2015	-	-	(-)
2015–2018	Toulouse Métropole FC	90	(50)

International career
2009–	Mauritius	14	(2)
- * Club domestic league appearances and goals as of 28 January 2019

Jonathan Justin (born 27 February 1991 in Pereybèré, Rivière du Rempart) is a Mauritian-French footballer. He is currently a free agent. He is featured on the Mauritian national team in the official 2010 FIFA World Cup video game.

== Career ==
=== Senior career ===
Justin started off his professional career in 2007 with AS Auch Gascogne. He then bounced around in the lower leagues of France, playing for Rodez AF, Amiens SC, and again with AS Auch Gascogne. In January 2011, he transferred to Etoile FC of Singapore's S.League. On 7 March 2011, Justin scored his first two goals for the team in a 4-2 win over Hougang United FC. After only 5 months with the club, he was released by Etoile FC. He then signed with US Castanet in France.

== International career ==
Justin has called up to play for Mauritius in 2009, his country of birth. He scored his first goal for his country in a friendly against Mongolia. He scored his 2nd goal against Singapore in the country that he last played for in 2011 for Etoile.

=== International goals ===
Scores and results list Mauritius' goal tally first.

No	Date	Venue	Opponent	Score	Result	Competition
1.	27 March 2018	MFF Football Centre, Ulaanbaatar, Mongolia	Mongolia	1–0	2–0	Friendly
2.	7 September 2018	Bishan Stadium, Bishan, Singapore	Singapore	1–0	1–1	Friendly

== Personal ==
Justin was born in Mauritius, but moved to France when he was 9. When he arrived in France, he still go to Rodez Af and sign professional in Amiens SC.
