= Vincent Labonté =

Mauritian footballer

Personal information
- Full name: Vincent Labonté
- Date of birth: April 8, 1987 (age 39)
- Place of birth: Mauritius
- Position: Defender

Team information
- Current team: Curepipe Starlight SC

Senior career*
Years	Team	Apps	(Gls)
2006–	Curepipe Starlight SC		

International career
2008–	Mauritius	9	(0)
- * Club domestic league appearances and goals

Vincent Labonté (born April 8, 1987) is a Mauritian football player who currently plays for Curepipe Starlight SC in the Mauritian Premier League and for the Mauritius national football team as a defender.
