= Lantto =

Lantto is a surname. Notable people with the surname include:

- Ivar Lantto (1862–1938), Finnish politician
- Jonas Lantto (born 1987), Swedish footballer

== See also ==
- Lanto (disambiguation)
