= Bruno Rajaozara =

Malagasy footballer

Personal information
- Date of birth: May 8, 1981 (age 45)
- Place of birth: Madagascar
- Position: Goalkeeper

Team information
- Current team: AS Adema

Senior career*
Years	Team	Apps	(Gls)
1999–2005	Mahitsy A.O.M.		
2006–	AS Adema		

International career
2007–	Madagascar		
- * Club domestic league appearances and goals

Bruno Rajaozara (born May 8, 1981) is a Malagasy footballer currently plays for AS Adema.
