= Fabrice Pithia =

Mauritian football player (born 1987)

Personal information
- Full name: Louis Laval Fabrice Pithia
- Date of birth: 7 May 1987 (age 39)
- Place of birth: st aubin Mauritius
- Position: Midfielder

Team information
- Current team: Curepipe Starlight
- Number: 20

Senior career*
Years	Team	Apps	(Gls)
2003–2010	Savanne SC	-	(-)
2010–2016	Curepipe Starlight SC	-	(-)

International career
2006–2017	Mauritius	35	(5)
- * Club domestic league appearances and goals

Fabrice Pithia (born 7 May 1987) is a former Mauritian football player who played as a midfielder for Curepipe Starlight in the Mauritian Premier League and the Mauritius national football team.

== Senior career ==
Fabrice started his professional career along with his brother Fabien for Savanne SC in the Mauritian League in 2003, at the age of 16. In 2010, he moved on to play for Curepipe Starlight SC, while his brother stayed behind. After the 2011 Indian Ocean Island Games, in which Fabrice was leading scorer and one of the tournament's best players, he received interest from clubs both domestically and abroad, and has stated he is open to playing abroad. Cypriot First Division club AC Omonia showed interest in signing Fabrice, along with his brother Fabien and fellow Mauritian international Gurty Calambé, but nothing came of it.

== International career ==
Fabrice has represented Mauritius internationally since 2006. He was called up to represent Mauritius in the 2011 Indian Ocean Island Games. He scored his first goal for Club M in their opening game against Maldives, a game which ended 1-1. He proceeded to score two more goals in each of the next two games of the group stage to lead Mauritius into the knockout stage. Mauritius eventually made it to the final, but were beaten by Seychelles on penalties.

== Career statistics ==
=== International ===
Appearances and goals by national team and year
National team	Year	Apps	Goals
Mauritius	2006	1	0
Mauritius	2007	4	0
Mauritius	2008	6	0
Mauritius	2009	4	0
Mauritius	2010	2	0
Mauritius	2011	10	3
Mauritius	2012	3	1
Mauritius	2013	5	1
Mauritius	2014	1	0
Mauritius	2015	5	0
Mauritius	2017	1	0
Total		42	5

Scores and results list Mauritius' goal tally first, score column indicates score after each Pithia goal.

List of international goals scored by Fabrice Pithia
No.	Date	Venue	Opponent	Score	Result	Competition	Ref.
1	4 August 2011	Amitié Stadium, Praslin, Seychelles	Maldives	1–0	1–1	2011 Indian Ocean Island Games	
2	6 August 2011	Stade Linité, Victoria, Seychelles	Seychelles	1–2	1–2	2011 Indian Ocean Island Games	
3	9 August 2011	Amitié Stadium, Praslin, Seychelles	Comoros	1–0	2–0	2011 Indian Ocean Island Games	
4	1 December 2012	George V Stadium, Curepipe, Mauritius	Comoros	–	2–0	2014 African Nations Championship qualification	
5	10 July 2013	Nkana Stadium, Kitwe, Zambia	Seychelles	3–0	4–0	2013 COSAFA Cup	

== Personal ==
Fabrice has a twin brother, Fabien, who also plays in the Mauritian League for Curepipe Starlight as well as for Club M internationally. Fabrice was featured on the Mauritian national team in the official 2010 FIFA World Cup video game, as he played with Mauritius in 2010 FIFA World Cup qualification matches.
