= Eric-Julien Rakotondrabe =

Malagasy footballer

Personal information
- Full name: Eric-Julien Faneva Rakotondrabe
- Date of birth: December 1, 1980 (age 45)
- Place of birth: Madagascar
- Position: Central midfielder

Team information
- Current team: Fanilo Japan Actuels

Senior career*
Years	Team	Apps	(Gls)
1998–2000	FC BFV		
2001–2005	Stade Olympique de l'Emyrne		
2006–2007	USCA Foot		
2008–	Fanilo Japan Actuels		

International career
1999–	Madagascar	44	(0)
- * Club domestic league appearances and goals

Eric-Julien Rakotondrabe (born December 1, 1980) is a Malagasy footballer currently plays for Fanilo Japan Actuels.

== Honours ==
=== Club ===
Stade Olympique de l'Emyrne

- THB Champions League (1) : Champion : 2001

Fanilo Japan Actuels

- THB Champions League (1) : Champion : 2011

=== National team ===
- Football at the Indian Ocean Island Games silver medal:2007
