= Christopher Caserne =

Mauritian international footballer

Personal information
- Full name: Christopher Peter Caserne
- Date of birth: 22 February 1993 (age 33)
- Place of birth: Port Louis, Mauritius
- Height: 1.80 m (5 ft 11 in)
- Position: Goalkeeper

Team information
- Current team: Bolton City

Senior career*
Years	Team	Apps	(Gls)
2014–2016	Cercle de Joachim		
2016–2022	Bolton City		
2022-2023	US Beau Bassin-Rose Hill		
2023-	Bolton City		

International career^{‡}
2015–	Mauritius	4	(0)
- * Club domestic league appearances and goals as of 21:19, 23 April 2025 (UTC) ‡ National team caps and goals as of 10:41, 20 January 2020 (UTC)

Christopher Peter Caserne (born 22 February 1993) is a Mauritian international footballer who plays for Bolton City as a goalkeeper.

== Career ==
Born in Port Louis, he has played club football for Cercle de Joachim, Bolton City and US Beau Bassin-Rose Hill.

He made his international debut for Mauritius in 2015.

Caserne launched a goalkeeping academy in 2021.
