= Leonardo Boto =

Argentine politician

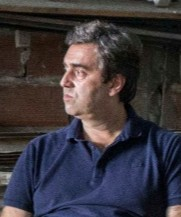
- Boto in 2020

Mayor of Luján
- Incumbent
- Assumed office 10 December 2019
- Preceded by: Oscar Luciani

Personal details
- Born: 20 April 1970 (age 56) Buenos Aires, Argentina
- Party: Unidad por Luján
- Other party: Frente de Todos

Leonardo Boto (born 20 April 1970) is an Argentine politician and tourism executive. He is the former chairman of the National Institute of Tourism Promotion of Argentina. Since 2019, he has been intendente (mayor) of Luján, Buenos Aires, for the Frente de Todos coalition.

== Early life ==
Boto completed his undergraduate education at the Universidad del Salvador, earning a degree in Geography then completed a master's degree in Public Policy and Administration from the University of San Andrés. Boto also attended the University of Montana (United States) where his studies concentrated on a specialized program for Wildlife Recreation Management. Later at the Guile Foundation in Switzerland, he completed a program on public service.

== Career in tourism ==
Boto has been active in the tourism industry of Argentina working for the National Commission of Tourist Security and holding such posts as Director of the Program of Tourism for the October Foundation and National Director of Management for Tourist Quality at the Ministry of Tourism of Argentina. He was promoted to Chairman of INPROTUR, the National Institute for the Promotion of Tourism of Argentina in March 2009.

== Dakar rally ==
In 2009, he coordinated the transference of the Dakar Rally, the world's most popular Rally raid from northern Africa to Argentina and Chile. The change in location has dramatically altered the character of the race. Although the goal is the same, following a pre-determined 9000 km path through treacherous terrain, drivers would sometimes go for days in North Africa without seeing spectators. In 2009, on the first day over 500,000 Argentines filled the streets of Buenos Aires to watch the trucks, cars and motorcyclists start the event. It is estimated that over the three million Argentines lined the race course over the next fourteen days.
