= Contemporary Arts Center (New Orleans) =

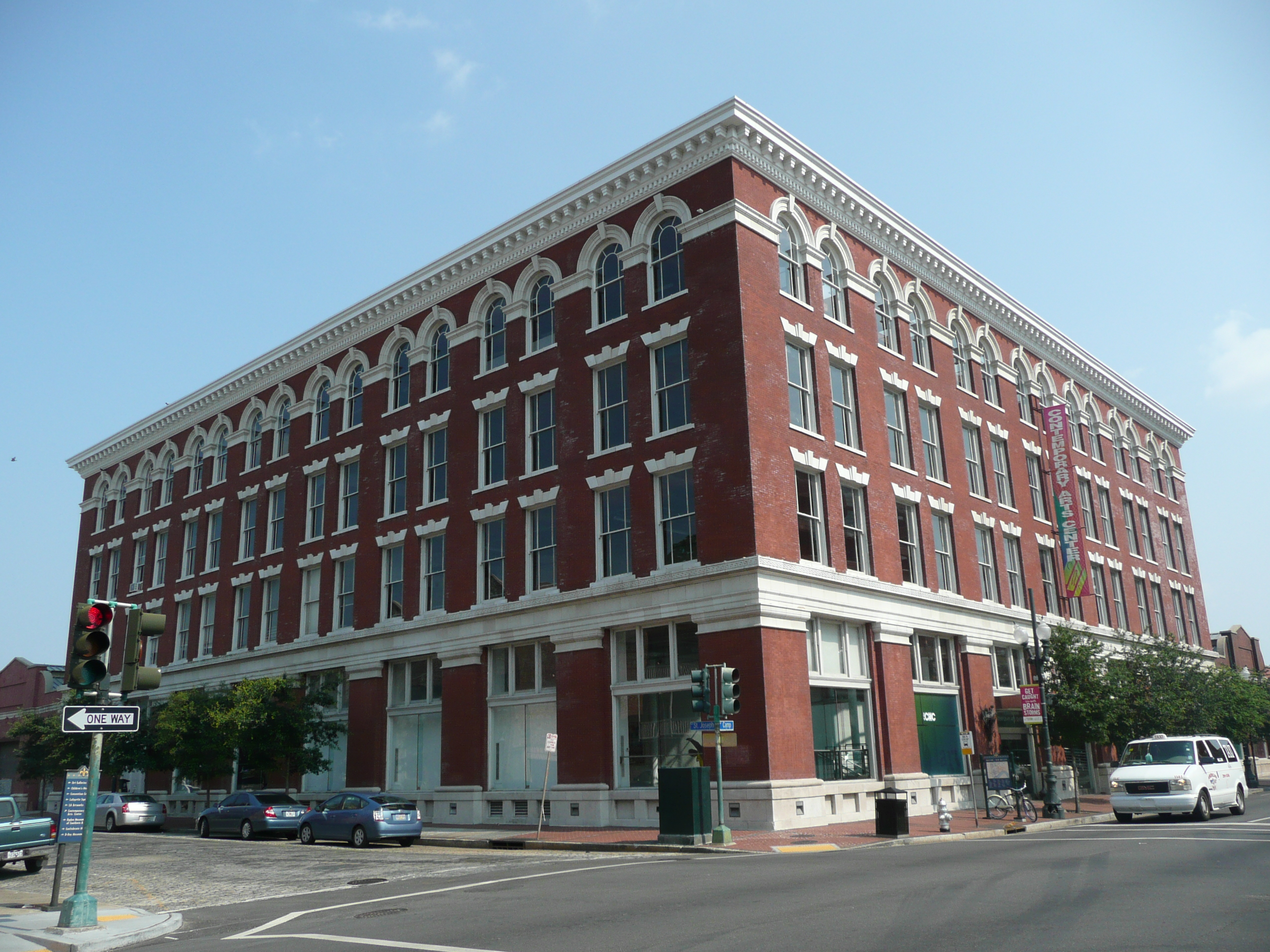

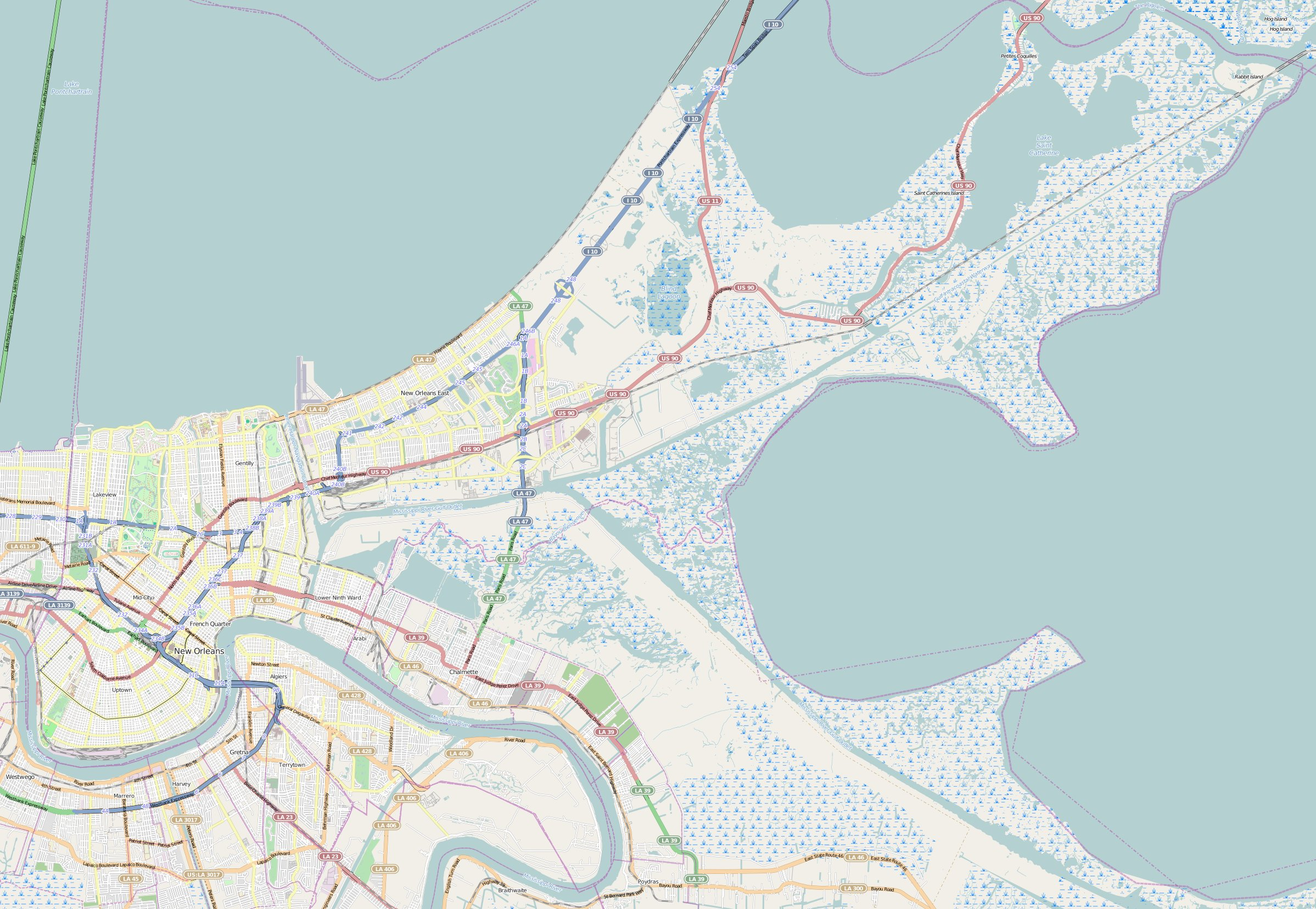
- Contemporary Arts Center (New Orleans) (Louisiana) Contemporary Arts Center (New Orleans) (the United States)
- Established: 1976
- Location: New Orleans, Louisiana
- Coordinates: 29.9437316°N 90.0728177°W
- Type: Art museum
- Director: George Scheer
- Chairpersons: Brian Bailey and Gregg Porter
- Website: cacno.org

The Contemporary Arts Center, New Orleans is an arts complex located in historic downtown New Orleans. Founded in 1976, the center plays host to events and performances from visual arts to concert performances and lectures. General gallery admission is free to Louisiana residents, with varying hours and ticket arrangements for concerts and other special events. The center also regularly offers courses for interested students in numerous different facets of the arts.
