= Samuel Brasse =

Mauritian international footballer

Personal information
- Date of birth: 15 July 1996 (age 30)
- Position: Midfielder

Team information
- Current team: Bolton City

Senior career*
Years	Team	Apps	(Gls)
2016–	Bolton City		

International career^{‡}
2017–	Mauritius	2	(0)
- * Club domestic league appearances and goals as of 09:15, 15 March 2018 (UTC) ‡ National team caps and goals as of 09:15, 15 March 2018 (UTC)

Samuel Brasse (born 15 July 1996) is a Mauritian international footballer who plays for Bolton City as a midfielder.

== Career ==
He has played club football for Bolton City.

He made his international debut for Mauritius in 2017.
