= Katalin Botos =

Hungarian economist

- Born: December 13, 1941 (age 84)
- Education: Corvinus University of Budapest
- Occupations: Economist, academic
- Awards: András Fáy Memorial Plaque (1994); MKT Széchenyi Medal (2001); Catholic University of Milan Memorial Medal (2004); PPKE JAK Memorial; Medal (2005); Prudencia Prize (2006); 100 Outstanding Women; Commemorative Plaque (2008); Professor emeritus, SZTE (2011); Hungarian Order of Merit (2012)

Katalin Botos (born December 13, 1941 in Oradea) is a Hungarian economist, university professor, minister without portfolio in charge of banking affairs in the Antall government and doctor of economics.

== Education ==
Botos studied economics at the Marx Károly University of Economics in Budapest, graduating with a diploma in 1964. She then continued her studies at the Corvinus University of Budapest where she graduated in 1970. She received her candidate's degree in 1973 and her doctorate in economics in 1987.

== Career ==
From 1964 to 1971 Botos worked at a Hungarian Investment Bank. She worked in the Ministry of Finance and the Agricultural Research Institute before she was minister without portfolio in charge of banking affairs in the Antall Government between 1990 and 1992.

She was professor at the University of Miskolc, the University of Szeged and the Pázmány Péter Catholic University. She is the founder and head of the Heller Farkas Institute of Economics.

She also was a visiting lecturer at the Catholic University of San Francisco and the University of Vienna.

Her research topics are economic history, financial policy, international finance and European monetary integration.

== Memberships ==
Botos is a member of the European Academy of Sciences and Arts.

== Awards ==
Botos won the András Fáy Memorial Plaque in 1994, the MKT Széchenyi Medal in 2001 and the Catholic University of Milan Memorial Medal in 2004. She was awarded the PPKE JAK Memorial Medal in 2005, the Prudencia Prize in 2006, the 100 Outstanding Women Commemorative Plaque in 2008 and the professor emeritus, SZTE in 2011. In 2012, she was awarded the Hungarian Order of Merit.
