= Ali Mourade =

Comorian footballer (born 1984)

Personal information
- Full name: Ali Mourade
- Date of birth: 17 October 1984 (age 42)
- Place of birth: Marseille, France
- Height: 1.90 m (6 ft 3 in)
- Position: Defender

Senior career*
| Years | Team | Apps | (Gls) |
| 2003–2005 | Bordeaux B | | |
| 2009–2013 | FC La Sarraz-Eclépens | | |

International career^{‡}
| 2011 | Comoros | 3 | (0) |
- * Club domestic league appearances and goals as of 13 April 2018 ‡ National team caps and goals as of 6 January 2012

Ali Mourade (born October 17, 1984) is a Comorian footballer who plays as a defender.

== Club career ==
In 2011, he signed with Swiss side FC La Sarraz-Ecläpens.

== International career ==
In 2011, he made his debut for the Comoros national football team.
