= Hajanirina Lanto Ramaherijaona =

Malagasy politician

Hajanirina Lanto Ramaherijaona (born 29 January 1969) is a Malagasy businessman and politician. A member of the National Assembly of Madagascar, he was elected as a member of the Tiako I Madagasikara party n the 2007 Malagasy parliamentary elections. He represents the constituency of Tsiroanomandidy.

He is also the general director of the Mahery Group. He was reelected in 2019 under the flag of IRD.
