= Jean-Jacques Razanajafy =

Malagasy footballer

Personal information
- Date of birth: 30 March 1988 (age 38)
- Place of birth: Antananarivo, Madagascar
- Height: 1.73 m (5 ft 8 in)
- Position: Midfielder

Senior career*
Years	Team	Apps	(Gls)
2011–2019	Ajesaia		

International career
2011	Madagascar	1	(0)
- * Club domestic league appearances and goals

Jean-Jacques Razanajafy (born 30 March 1988) is a retired Malagasy football midfielder.
