= Kerlson Agathe =

Mauritian international footballer

Personal information
- Date of birth: 8 March 1991 (age 35)
- Place of birth: Pamplemousses, Mauritius
- Height: 1.72 m (5 ft 7 1/2 in)
- Position: Midfielder

Team information
- Current team: Pamplemousses

Senior career*
Years	Team	Apps	(Gls)
2011–	Pamplemousses		

International career^{‡}
2017–	Mauritius	1	(0)
- * Club domestic league appearances and goals as of 10:13, 14 March 2018 (UTC) ‡ National team caps and goals as of 10:13, 14 March 2018 (UTC)

Kerlson Agathe (born 8 March 1991) is a Mauritian international footballer who plays for Pamplemousses as a midfielder.

== Career ==
Born in Pamplemousses, he has played club football for Pamplemousses.

He made his international debut for Mauritius in 2017.
