= Alex Nibourette =

Seychellois footballer

Alex Nibourette (born December 26, 1983) is a Seychellois football player. He is a striker on the Seychelles national football team.

Nibourette helped Seychelles win the football tournament at the 2011 Indian Ocean Games in August 2011.

== Career statistics ==
=== International ===
Appearances and goals by national team and year
National team	Year	Apps	Goals
Seychelles	2003	3	0
Seychelles	2005	1	0
Seychelles	2006	1	0
Seychelles	2007	7	0
Seychelles	2008	6	0
Seychelles	2009	2	0
Seychelles	2011	6	1
Seychelles	2012	1	1
Seychelles	2013	2	0
Seychelles	2015	1	0
Total		30	2

Scores and results list Seychelles' goal tally first, score column indicates score after each Nibourette goal.

List of international goals scored by Alex Nibourette
No.	Date	Venue	Opponent	Score	Result	Competition	Ref.
1	11 August 2011	Stade Linité, Victoria, Seychelles	Réunion	1–1	2–1	2011 Indian Ocean Island Games	
2	15 December 2012	Stade Linité, Victoria, Seychelles	Mozambique	1–2	1–2	2014 African Nations Championship qualification	
