= Louis Guyand Chiffone =

Mauritian footballer

Louis Guiyano Chiffone
Personal information
- Full name: Louis Guiyano Chiffone
- Date of birth: February 18, 1988 (age 38)
- Place of birth: Mauritius
- Position: Midfielder

Team information
- Current team: Savanne SC

Senior career*
Years	Team	Apps	(Gls)
2010–	Savanne SC	-	(-)

International career
2009–	Mauritius	4	(0)
- * Club domestic league appearances and goals

Louis Guiyano Chiffone (born February 18, 1988, in Mauritius) is a Mauritian football player who currently plays for Savanne SC in the Mauritian League. He has also played for the Mauritius national football team. He is featured on the Mauritian national team in the official 2010 FIFA World Cup video game.
