= Boto Fagnorena =

Malagasy footballer

Personal information
- Date of birth: 14 January 1985 (age 41)
- Place of birth: Antananarivo, Madagascar
- Height: 1.81 m (5 ft 11 in)
- Position: Forward

Senior career*
Years	Team	Apps	(Gls)
2008–2011	Japan Actuel's FC		
2012–2013	La Passe FC		
2014–2018	Anse Réunion FC		

International career
2009–2011	Madagascar	5	(0)
- * Club domestic league appearances and goals

Boto Fagnorena (born 14 January 1985) is a Malagasy former footballer who played as a striker.
