= Maurice Mosa =

Malagasy footballer and coach

Personal information
- Full name: Maurice Mosa
- Date of birth: c.1948
- Place of birth: Madagascar
- Date of death: August 1, 2013 (65 years old)

International career
Years	Team	Apps	(Gls)
c. 1970	Madagascar		

Managerial career
- 1993: Madagascar
- 2011: Madagascar

Maurice Mosa was a Malagasy international footballer and former team coach of the Madagascar national football team. He led Madagascar's senior side in multiple tenures, including the Indian Ocean Island Games campaigns in the 1990s and again in 2011.

== Death ==
He died on 1 August 2013, following an accidental fall at his residence in Analamahitsy at 65 years of age.
