= Lantos =

Lantos is a Hungarian surname. Notable people with the surname include:

- Csaba Lantos (born 1943), Hungarian volleyball player
- Csaba Lantos (born 1962), Hungarian economist
- Gabriella Lantos (born 1970), Hungarian fencer
- John D. Lantos (born 1954), American paediatrician
- László Lantos (1938–2019), Hungarian swimmer
- Mária Balla-Lantos (born 1944), Hungarian swimmer
- Mihály Lantos (1928–1989), Hungarian footballer and manager
- Peter Lantos (born 1939), British scientist
- Robert Lantos (born 1949), Canadian film producer
- Tom Lantos (1928–2008), American politician
