= Robin Rakotonirina =

Malagasy footballer

Personal information
- Full name: Robin Jean Claude Rakotonirina
- Date of birth: 28 May 1985 (age 41)
- Place of birth: Marovoay, Madagascar
- Height: 1.86 m (6 ft 1 in)
- Position: Goalkeeper

Senior career*
Years	Team	Apps	(Gls)
- Commune Majunga
–2012	ASCUM		
2013–2014	TCO Boeny		

International career
2011–2014	Madagascar	4	(0)
- * Club domestic league appearances and goals

Robin Rakotonirina (born 28 May 1985) is a retired Malagasy football goalkeeper.
