= Joye Estazie =

Mauritian footballer

Personal information
- Full name: Joye Estazie
- Date of birth: August 10, 1984 (age 42)
- Place of birth: Mauritius
- Position: Defender

Team information
- Current team: AS de Vacoas-Phoenix

Senior career*
Years	Team	Apps	(Gls)
2006–2010	PAS Mates	–	(–)
2011–	AS de Vacoas-Phoenix	–	(–)

International career
2010–2013	Mauritius	15	(1)
- * Club domestic league appearances and goals as of 18 June 2011

Joye Estazie (born August 10, 1984) is a Mauritian footballer who currently plays as a defender for AS de Vacoas-Phoenix in the Mauritian League.

== Career ==
=== Senior career ===
Estazie started off his professional career in 2006 with PAS Mates of the Mauritian League, where he later served as captain of the team. In 2011, he transferred to AS de Vacoas-Phoenix.

=== International career ===
Estazie has earned fifteen caps for Mauritius. On 9 October 2010, he scored an own goal for Senegal in the 90th minute of Mauritius' AFCON qualifying match, which Mauritius lost 7-0. He scored his first goal for Mauritius in a friendly draw against Réunion in September 2012.

== Career statistics ==
=== International ===
Appearances and goals by national team and year
National team	Year	Apps	Goals
Mauritius	2010	1	0
Mauritius	2011	7	0
Mauritius	2012	2	1
Mauritius	2013	5	0
Total		15	1

Scores and results list Mauritius's goal tally first, score column indicates score after each Estazie goal.

List of international goals scored by Joye Estazie
No.	Date	Venue	Opponent	Score	Result	Competition
1	15 September 2012	George V Stadium, Curepipe, Mauritius	Réunion	1–1	1–1	Friendly
