= Menzy Coco =

Mauritian footballer

Personal information
- Full name: Menzy Angelo Coco
- Date of birth: December 22, 1989 (age 36)
- Place of birth: Mauritius
- Position: Midfielder

Team information
- Current team: Curepipe Starlight

Senior career*
Years	Team	Apps	(Gls)
2010–2013	ASPL 2000		
2014–	Curepipe Starlight		

International career^{‡}
2010–	Mauritius	10	(0)
- * Club domestic league appearances and goals as of March 27, 2015 ‡ National team caps and goals as of March 27, 2015

Menzy Coco (born December 22, 1989) is a Mauritian footballer who currently plays for Curepipe Starlight in the Mauritian League as a midfielder.

== Career ==
=== Senior career ===
Coco started off his professional career in 2010 with ASPL 2000.

=== International career ===
Coco earned his first cap for Mauritius in October 2010 in an AFCON qualifying match against Senegal. His second cap came in March 2011, in another AFCON qualifier, against DR Congo.
