= Curepipe Starlight SC =

- Full name: Curepipe Starlight Sports Club
- Founded: 2001
- Ground: Stade George V Curepipe, Plaines Wilhems District
- Capacity: 6,200
- Chairman: Gaël Lebaudiere
- Manager: James Philippe
- League: Mauritian Second Division
- 2013: 1st

Curepipe Starlight Sports Club is a Mauritian football club based in Curepipe. They play in the Mauritian League, the top tier of Mauritian football.

They won the league for the first time in 2007 and thus qualified for the CAF Champions League 2008. They then became part of history when they played at the Stade Said Mohamed Cheikh in Moroni, where an African club competition match was hosted in the Comoros Islands for the first time. In 2008, they won the Mauritian League, the Mauritian Cup as well as the Mauritian Republic Cup. Curepipe Starlight also won the league title in 2009.

In 2013, Curepipe Starlight SC won their fourth top-tier title. They often played home games in front of dozens of spectators in that league season.

== Ground ==
Their home stadium is the 6,200-capacity Stade George V, which is located in Curepipe, Plaines Wilhems District. They share this stadium with another club named Cercle de Joachim.

== Achievements ==
- Mauritian League: 4

2006–07, 2007–08, 2008–09, 2012–13

- Mauritian Cup: 3

2006, 2008, 2013

- Mauritian Republic Cup: 2

2007, 2008

== Performance in CAF competitions ==
- CAF Champions League: 2 appearances

2008 – First Round
2009 – Preliminary Round

- CAF Confederation Cup: 1 appearance

2007 – Preliminary Round

== Current squad ==
As of September 1, 2017

Note: Flags indicate national team as defined under FIFA eligibility rules; some limited exceptions apply. Players may hold more than one non-FIFA nationality.

No.	Pos.	Nation	Player
2	DF	MRI	Chandrayah Veeranah
3	DF	MRI	Johan Candassamy
6	MF	MRI	Sewraj Dawoochand
8	MF	MRI	Fabrice Pauline
9	DF	MRI	Vincent Labonte
10	MF	MRI	Tommy Sanhoboa
12	MF	MRI	Johan Marmitte
25	DF	MAD	Damien Mahavony
1	GK	MRI	Désiré-Francois Ammomoodhoo
15	MF	MRI	Menzy Coco
17	MF	MRI	Jason Ferré
22	DF	MRI	France Pierre

No.	Pos.	Nation	Player
19	MF	MRI	Fabien Pithia
28	DF	MRI	Luc Romain Harel
35	DF	MRI	Joseph Michel Pilot
49	MF	MRI	Fabrice Pithia
37	MF	MRI	David Lim Sik Fang
55	MF	MRI	Jeannot Lamarque
63	MF	MRI	Julian George Robinson
77	MF	MRI	James Percy Keisler
83	MF	MRI	Mikaël Mitraille
89	FW	MRI	David Azie
92	FW	MRI	Zoubaïr Rummun
