= Andry Lalaina Rakotozanany =

Malagasy footballer (born 1983)

Personal information
- Date of birth: 31 January 1983 (age 43)
- Place of birth: Antananarivo, Madagascar
- Height: 1.68 m (5 ft 6 in)
- Position: Midfielder

Senior career*
| Years | Team | Apps | (Gls) |
| 2010–2019 | AS Port-Louis 2000 | | |

International career
| 2011 | Madagascar | 1 | (0) |
- * Club domestic league appearances and goals

Andry Lalaina Rakotozanany (born 31 January 1983) is a retired Malagasy football midfielder.
