= Bruno Ravina =

Mauritian footballer

Personal information
- Full name: Bruno Ravina
- Date of birth: March 24, 1984 (age 42)
- Place of birth: Mauritius
- Position: Defender

Team information
- Current team: AS Port-Louis 2000
- Number: 5

Senior career*
Years	Team	Apps	(Gls)
2006–	AS Port-Louis 2000	-	(-)

International career^{‡}
2007–	Mauritius	37	(1)
- * Club domestic league appearances and goals ‡ National team caps and goals as of 19 March 2017

Bruno Ravina (born March 24, 1984) is a Mauritian football player who currently plays for AS Port-Louis 2000 in the Mauritian Premier League and for the Mauritius national football team as a defender. He is featured on the Mauritian national team in the official 2010 FIFA World Cup video game.

== International career ==
=== International goals ===
Scores and results list Mauritius' goal tally first.

No	Date	Venue	Opponent	Score	Result	Competition
1.	25 March 2015	Stade George V, Curepipe, Mauritius	Burundi	2–1	2–2	Friendly
