= Roche Caiman =

Coordinates: 4°39′S 55°28′E

- District

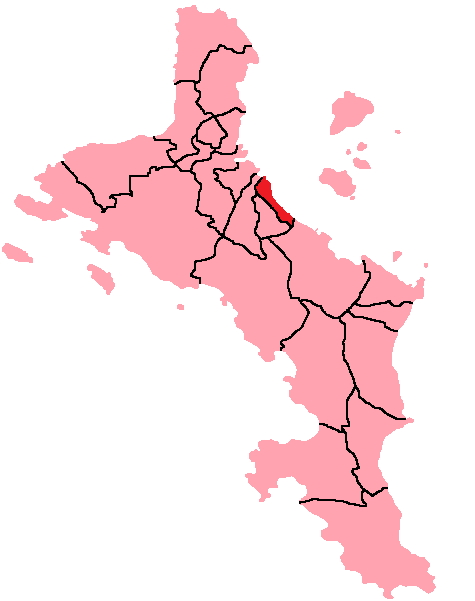
- Location within Mahé Island, Seychelles
- Country: Seychelles

Government
  - District Administrator: Wilbert Omath
  - Member of National Assembly: Hon. Audrey Vidot (PL)

Population (2019 Estimate)
  - Total: 2,905
- Time zone: Seychelles Time

Roche Caïman (French pronunciation: [ʁɔʃ kaimɑ̃]) is an administrative district of Seychelles located on the island of Mahé. It has a football stadium where its national team play most of the home matches.

Like neighbouring Les Mamelles District, Roche Caïman District was created in 1998 from reclaimed land and from parts of Plaisance District.

== See also ==
- Roche Caiman Power Station
