= Fabien Pithia =

Mauritian footballer (born 1987)

Personal information
- Full name: Louis Désiré Fabien Pithia
- Date of birth: 7 May 1987 (age 39)
- Place of birth: Mauritius
- Position: Midfielder

Team information
- Current team: Curepipe Starlight

Senior career*
Years	Team	Apps	(Gls)
2006–2012	Savanne SC	–	(–)
2012–2013	ASPL 2000	–	(–)
2014–	Curepipe Starlight	–	(–)

International career^{‡}
2008–2015	Mauritius	25	(1)
- * Club domestic league appearances and goals as of 27 March 2015 ‡ National team caps and goals as of 12 November 2017

Fabien Pithia (born 7 May 1987) is a Mauritian footballer who plays for Curepipe Starlight in the Mauritian League as a midfielder.

== Career ==
=== Senior career ===
Fabien started off his professional career in 2006 with Savanne SC, and has played with the club ever since.

=== International career ===
Fabien earned his first cap for Club M in 2008.

=== International goals ===
Scores and results list Mauritius' goal tally first.

No	Date	Venue	Opponent	Score	Result	Competition
1.	6 September 2015	Stade Anjalay, Belle Vue Maurel, Mauritius	Mozambique	1–0	1–0	2017 Africa Cup of Nations qualification

== Personal ==
Fabien has a twin brother, Fabrice, who also played in the Mauritian League for Curepipe Starlight as well as for Club M internationally.
