= Eric Nelson Sopha =

Seychellois footballer (born 1974)

Eric Nelson Sopha (born September 13, 1974) is a Seychellois football player. He is a goalkeeper on the Seychelles national football team. Sopha also plays for the reigning Seychelles League champions St Michel United FC. He has been at the club since 2000. He has 32 caps for the Seychelles, making him the most-capped player in their current squad.
