= Christopher Bazerque =

Mauritian football player

Personal information
- Full name: Christopher Bazerque
- Date of birth: March 31, 1987 (age 39)
- Place of birth: Mauritius
- Position: Defender

Team information
- Current team: Petite Rivière Noire SC
- Number: 2

Senior career*
Years	Team	Apps	(Gls)
2007–	Petite Rivière Noire SC	-	(-)

International career
2008–	Mauritius	22	(0)
- * Club domestic league appearances and goals

Christopher Bazerque (born March 31, 1987) is a Mauritian football player who currently plays for Petite Rivière Noire SC in the Mauritian Premier League and for the Mauritius national football team as a defender. He is featured on the Mauritian national team in the official 2010 FIFA World Cup video game.
