= Ibrahim Mchinda Madîhali =

Comorian footballer

Personal information
- Date of birth: 16 November 1988 (age 37)
- Position: Midfielder

Team information
- Current team: Consolat Marseille

Senior career*
Years	Team	Apps	(Gls)
2011–2013	1er Canton		
2013–2014	Endoume Catalans		
2014–	Pennoise		

International career^{‡}
2011–	Comoros	4	(0)
- * Club domestic league appearances and goals as of 18:07, 22 November 2015 (UTC) ‡ National team caps and goals as of 18:07, 22 November 2015 (UTC)

Ibrahim Mchinda Madîhali (born 16 November 1988) is a Comorian international footballer who plays for French club Pennoise, as a midfielder.

== Career ==
Madîhali has played for 1er Canton, Endoume Catalans and Pennoise.

He made his international debut for Comoros in 2011.
