= Mervyn Jocelyn =

Mauritian association football player

Personal information
- Full name: Jean Mervyn Jocelyn
- Date of birth: 21 August 1991 (age 35)
- Place of birth: Beau Bassin-Rose Hill, Mauritius
- Height: 1.74 m (5 ft 9 in)
- Position: Central defender

Team information
- Current team: Pamplemousses

Senior career*
Years	Team	Apps	(Gls)
2011	Chebel Citizens		
2011–2012	Rivière du Rempart		
2012–2014	La Cure Sylvester		
2014–2016	Chebel Citizens		
2016–	Pamplemousses		

International career^{‡}
2017–	Mauritius	16	(1)
- * Club domestic league appearances and goals as of 14:18, 10 August 2020 (UTC) ‡ National team caps and goals as of 14:18, 10 August 2020 (UTC)

Jean Mervyn Jocelyn (born 21 August 1991) is a Mauritian international footballer who plays for Pamplemousses as a central defender.

== Career ==
Born in Beau Bassin-Rose Hill, Jocelyn has played club football for Chebel Citizens, Rivière du Rempart, La Cure Sylvester and Pamplemousses.

He made his international debut for Mauritius in 2017. on 19 August 2017, he scored his first and only goal against India in their 1–2 defeat.

== International goals ==
Scores and results are list Mauritius's goal tally first.

No.	Date	Venue	Opponent	Score	Result	Competition
1.	19 August 2017	Mumbai Football Arena, Mumbai, India	India	1–0	1–2	2017 Hero Tri-Nation Series
