= Augustin Rabeasimbola =

Malagasy footballer

Personal information
- Full name: Lantonirina Augustin Rabeasimbola
- Date of birth: 9 January 1988 (age 38)
- Place of birth: Antananarivo, Madagascar
- Height: 1.64 m (5 ft 5 in)
- Position: Midfielder

Team information
- Current team: USS Tamponnaise

Senior career*
Years	Team	Apps	(Gls)
2005–2009	Academie Ny Antsika		
2010	Japan Actuel's FC		
2011	USS Tamponnaise		
2014–2016	CNaPS Sport		
2017–2018	Pamplemousses SC		
2018–	USS Tamponnaise		

International career
2008–2015	Madagascar	11	(1)
- * Club domestic league appearances and goals

Augustin Rabeasimbola (born 9 January 1988) is a Malagasy footballer who played as a midfielder for USS Tamponnaise.
