= Frédéric Sarah =

Mauritian footballer

Personal information
- Full name: Jean Frédéric Sarah
- Date of birth: 26 February 1998 (age 28)
- Place of birth: Quatre Bornes, Mauritius
- Height: 1.70 m (5 ft 7 in)
- Position: Midfielder

Team information
- Current team: Cercle de Joachim

Senior career*
Years	Team	Apps	(Gls)
2015–2018	Quatre Bornes		
2018–	Cercle de Joachim		

International career^{‡}
2017–	Mauritius	4	(1)
- * Club domestic league appearances and goals as of 14:54, 17 June 2020 (UTC) ‡ National team caps and goals as of 14:54, 17 June 2020 (UTC)

Jean Frédéric Sarah (born 26 February 1998) is a Mauritian international footballer who plays for Quatre Bornes as a midfielder.

== Career ==
Born in Quatre Bornes, he has played club football for Quatre Bornes and Cercle de Joachim.

He made his international debut for Mauritius in 2017.
