= Jean-Fabrice Augustin =

Mauritian footballer

Personal information
- Position: Defender

Team information
- Current team: La Cure Sylvester

Senior career*
Years	Team	Apps	(Gls)
2016–	La Cure Sylvester		

International career^{‡}
2017–	Mauritius	3	(1)
- * Club domestic league appearances and goals as of 09:15, 15 March 2018 (UTC) ‡ National team caps and goals as of 09:15, 28 March 2018 (UTC)

Jean-Fabrice Augustin is a Mauritian international footballer who plays for La Cure Sylvester as a defender.

== Career ==
He has played club football for La Cure Sylvester.

He made his international debut for Mauritius in 2017.

=== International goals ===
Scores and results list Mauritius' goal tally first.

No	Date	Venue	Opponent	Score	Result	Competition
1.	27 March 2018	MFF Football Centre, Ulaanbaatar, Mongolia	Mongolia	2–0	2–0	Friendly
