= Chandrayah Veeranah =

Mauritian footballer

Personal information
- Full name: Chandrayah Veeranah
- Date of birth: 23 March 1985 (age 41)
- Place of birth: Mauritius
- Height: 5 ft 10 in (1.78 m)
- Position: Defender

Team information
- Current team: Curepipe Starlight SC
- Number: 23

Senior career*
Years	Team	Apps	(Gls)
2004–2006	Olympique de Moka	–	(3)
2010–	Curepipe Starlight SC	–	(15)

International career^{‡}
2011–	Mauritius	27	(0)
- * Club domestic league appearances and goals as of 22 July 2013 ‡ National team caps and goals as of 22 July 2015

Chandrayah "Yash" Veeranah (born 23 March 1985) is a Mauritian footballer who plays as a defender for Curepipe Starlight SC in the Mauritian League and for the Mauritius national football team.

Yash Veeranah is a PE Teacher at SLT SSS. He lives in St Julien d'Hotman.
