= AS Adema =

Association football club in Madagascar

- Founded: 1955; 71 years ago
- Dissolved: 2021
- Ground: Mahamasina Stadium; Antananarivo, Madagascar
- Capacity: 40,880
- Manager: Auguste Raux
- League: THB Champions League
- 2020-21: THB Champions League, 1st
Home colours	Away colours

AS Adema was a Malagasy football club based in Antananarivo, Madagascar. They have won the THB Champions League championship on four occasions, in 2002, 2006, 2012 and 2021. In 2002 they also advanced to the quarterfinals of the CAF Cup where they lost to Al-Masry of Egypt.

AS Adema won a THB Champions League match against SO l'Emyrne by the score of 149–0 on 31 October 2002. SOE scored 149 own goals in protest against a refereeing decision.

== Achievements ==
- THB Champions League: 4

2002, 2006, 2012, 2021

- Coupe de Madagascar: 4

2007, 2008, 2009, 2010

- Super Coupe de Madagascar: 2

2006, 2008

- Record biggest win in football history: 149-0 vs. SO l'Emyrne (l'Emyrne protest referee decision)

== Performance in CAF competitions ==
- CAF Champions League: 2 appearances

2003 – Preliminary Round
2007 – First Round

- CAF Confederation Cup: 4 appearances

2008 – Preliminary Round
2009 – Preliminary Round
2010 – Preliminary Round
2011 – First Round of 16

- CAF Cup: 1 appearance

2002 – Quarter-Finals

== Current squad ==
Note: Flags indicate national team as defined under FIFA eligibility rules; some limited exceptions apply. Players may hold more than one non-FIFA nationality.

No.	Pos.	Nation	Player
1	GK	MAD	Bruno Rajaozara
2	DF	MAD	Leonard Baraka
3	DF	MAD	Tojonavalona Rajaonarisoa
4	DF	MAD	Tsima Eddy Randriamihaja
5	DF	MAD	Jean Tholix
6	MF	MAD	Jean Fidele Randriamala

No.	Pos.	Nation	Player
7	MF	MAD	Aina Rakotondramasy
10	MF	MAD	Jean Natal Ratsimialona
12	MF	MAD	Damien Mahavony
13	DF	MAD	Leonard Baraka
15	MF	MAD	Tsima Randriamihaja
