= 2019 Indian Ocean Island Games =

- Official logo of IOIG 2019
- Host: Mauritius
- Nations: 7
- Events: 173 in 14 sports
- Opening: 19 July
- Closing: 28 July
- Main venue: Anjalay Stadium, Belle Vue
- Website: jeuxdesiles2019.com

The 2019 Indian Ocean Island Games, officially known as Jeux des îles de l'océan Indien Maurice 2019 or simply JIOI Maurice 2019, is the 10th edition of this multi-sport event for athletes representing the National Olympic Committees of Indian Ocean island nations. It was held in Mauritius from July 19 – 28, 2019.

== Organisation ==
=== Venues ===
| Venues | Sports |
|---|---|
| Stade Germain Comarmond | Athletics |
| National Badminton Center, Rose Hill | Badminton |
| Phoenix Gymnasium, Vacoas-Phoenix | Basketball |
| National Boxing Center, Vacoas-Phoenix | Boxing |
| Côte-d'Or Sports Complex | Cycling |
| Stade George V | Football |
| Stade Auguste Vollaire | Football |
| Côte d'Or Sports Complex | Judo |
| Northfield Rugby Field, Northfields International High School | Rugby |
| Grand Bay Yacht Club, Grand-Baie | Sailing |
| Anse La Raie Youth Center, Anse La Raye | Sailing |
| Côte d'Or Sports Complex | Swimming |
| National Table Tennis Center, Beau Bassin | Table tennis |
| Mon Choisy Beach Volley Arena, Grand-Baie | Volleyball (Beach) |
| Pandit Sahadeo Gymnasium, Vacoas-Phoenix | Volleyball (Indoor) |
| James Burty David Gymnasium, Curepipe | Weightlifting |

== The Games ==
=== Participating IOCs ===
Over 2,000 athletes, from 7 countries, participated in the 2019 Indian Ocean Island Games.

Participating International Olympic Committees
- Comoros
- Madagascar
- Maldives
- Mauritius (host)
- Mayotte
- Réunion
- Seychelles

=== Sports ===
A total of 14 sports were represented at this edition of the Indian Ocean Island Games.

- Athletics (62)
- Badminton (5)
- Basketball (2)
- Boxing (10)
- Cycling (3)
- Football (1)
- Weightlifting (15)
- Judo (24)
- Sailing (9)
- Swimming (20)
- Table tennis (14)
- Volleyball
  - Beach (2)
  - Indoor (2)
- Rugby (1)

=== Medal table ===
* Host nation (Mauritius)

| Rank | Nation | Gold | Silver | Bronze | Total |
|---|---|---|---|---|---|
| 1 | Mauritius (MRI)* | 92 | 79 | 53 | 224 |
| 2 | Madagascar (MAD) | 49 | 47 | 31 | 127 |
| 3 | Réunion (REU) | 46 | 58 | 74 | 178 |
| 4 | Seychelles (SEY) | 28 | 32 | 51 | 111 |
| 5 | Maldives (MDV) | 4 | 4 | 7 | 15 |
| 6 | Mayotte (MYT) | 3 | 2 | 10 | 15 |
| 7 | Comoros (COM) | 1 | 3 | 11 | 15 |
| Totals (7 entries) | | 223 | 225 | 237 | 685 |
