= 2011 Indian Ocean Island Games =

- Official logo
- Host: Seychelles
- Teams: 7 islands
- Events: 12
- Opening: 5 August 2011
- Closing: 14 August 2011
- Opened by: James Michel

The 2011 Indian Ocean Island Games were the 8th edition of the competition, held in Victoria, Seychelles. The last edition was held in 2007 in Madagascar.

The Games' mascot was a Kato Nwar, the national bird of the Seychelles.

== The Games ==
=== Participating teams ===
7 islands, all located in the Indian Ocean, competed in the 2011 Indian Ocean Island Games.

- Comoros
- Madagascar
- Maldives
- Mauritius
- Mayotte
- Réunion
- Seychelles

=== Venues ===
| Venues | Sports |
|---|---|
| Centre International des Conférences | Weightlifting |
| Centre de Sport Nautique | Sailing |
| Gymnase la Promenade | Badminton |
| Gymnase Omnisports | Judo, table tennis |
| Gymnase de Victoria | Basketball |
| Palais des Sport | Basketball, volleyball |
| Piscine Olympique | Swimming |
| Salle de Roche Caïman | Boxing |
| Stade d'Amitié | Football |
| Stade Linité | Football |
| Stade Popiler | Athletics |

=== Sports ===
- Athletics
- Badminton
- Basketball
- Boxing
- Cycling
- Football
- Judo
- Sailing
- Swimming
- Table tennis
- Volleyball
- Weightlifting

=== Calendar ===
- Official calendar

=== Medal table ===
* Host nation (Seychelles)

| Rank | Nation | Gold | Silver | Bronze | Total |
|---|---|---|---|---|---|
| 1 | Réunion | 58 | 66 | 58 | 182 |
| 2 | Seychelles* | 57 | 29 | 39 | 125 |
| 3 | Mauritius | 38 | 59 | 47 | 144 |
| 4 | Madagascar | 33 | 35 | 45 | 113 |
| 5 | Comoros | 1 | 1 | 3 | 5 |
| 6 | Mayotte | 0 | 2 | 0 | 2 |
| 7 | Maldives | 0 | 1 | 5 | 6 |
| Totals (7 entries) | | 187 | 193 | 197 | 577 |
