= Japan Actuel's FC =

Malagasy football club

- Full name: Japan Actuel's FC
- Ground: Stade Vélodrome (Antsirabe); Antsirabe, Madagascar
- Capacity: 5,000
- League: THB Champions League
- 2011: 1st

Japan Actuel's FC was a Malagasy football club.

== Achievements ==
- THB Champions League: 1 2011, won

== Performance in CAF competitions ==
- CAF Champions League: 1 appearance

2012

== Players ==
Note: Flags indicate national team as defined under FIFA eligibility rules; some limited exceptions apply. Players may hold more than one non-FIFA nationality.

No.	Pos.	Nation	Player
—	MF	(Madagascar) MAD	Eric-Julien Rakotondrabe
—	MF	(Madagascar) MAD	Lanto Rabeasimbola
