= 2010 FIFA World Cup South Africa (video game) =

2010 video game

- North American cover art
- Developers: EA Canada (PS3, Xbox 360 & iOS); HB Studios (Wii & PSP)
- Publisher: EA Sports
- Series: FIFA World Cup
- Platforms: PlayStation 3 Xbox 360; Wii; PlayStation Portable iOS
- Release: NA: 27 April 2010; AU: 29 April 2010; UK: 30 April 2010; iOS: NZ: 29 April 2010; NA: 28 June 2010
- Genre: Sports
- Modes: Single-player, Multiplayer

2010 FIFA World Cup South Africa is the official video game for the 2010 FIFA World Cup, published by EA Sports and available to play on iOS and all major seventh-generation platforms except the Nintendo DS. Announced in January 2010 during an interview with one of the producers of the game, it was released 27 April 2010 in North America. 199 of the 204 teams that took part in the 2010 FIFA World Cup qualification are included in the game.

== Gameplay ==
The method of taking a penalty kick was altered in the game. In the player's display in the bottom-left, the colored bar below the name represents the accuracy, while the green bar above represents the power (PS3/Xbox 360 versions only). This feature was thereafter adopted for future FIFA titles up until FIFA 17.

Players choose a team from the 199 nations available and compete against the computer or against other players through online gaming services PlayStation Network or Xbox Live. All 10 official World Cup stadiums are available for play.

EA announced that there would be gameplay improvements over FIFA 10, such as a higher rate of player fatigue for matches at higher altitudes, with an advantage to a home team who plays at a higher altitude against an away team who does not. EA also announced that players could get injured outside international matches.

EA also announced that the "Captain Your Country" mode would return, similar to the "Be a Pro" mode, and that FIFA 10 owners can import their Virtual Pro for this purpose and then earn CYC Accomplishments and attribute boosts. The game's penalty kick mechanism was changed so that their outcome better reflected the player's own composure. In addition, the game's online multiplayer lobby system was limited to unranked head-to-head matches. As in 2006 FIFA World Cup, a "scenario" mode is included with 55 playable scenarios from past World Cup matches. Scenarios from the 2010 World Cup are also playable with an online update.

The Wii version of the game features more stylised graphics and utilises a nuanced physics system to allow for more casual, arcade-style gameplay. This version supports multiple control schemes, including the Classic Controller. Exclusively in this version, players are required to use quick-time events to save free kicks or penalty shots, or to win possession of the ball after goal kicks and corner kicks. It is also possible for multiple players to take control of one team in that version.

The game includes Clive Tyldesley and Andy Townsend as the commentators, who provide insight into both sides during matches.

== Teams and venues ==
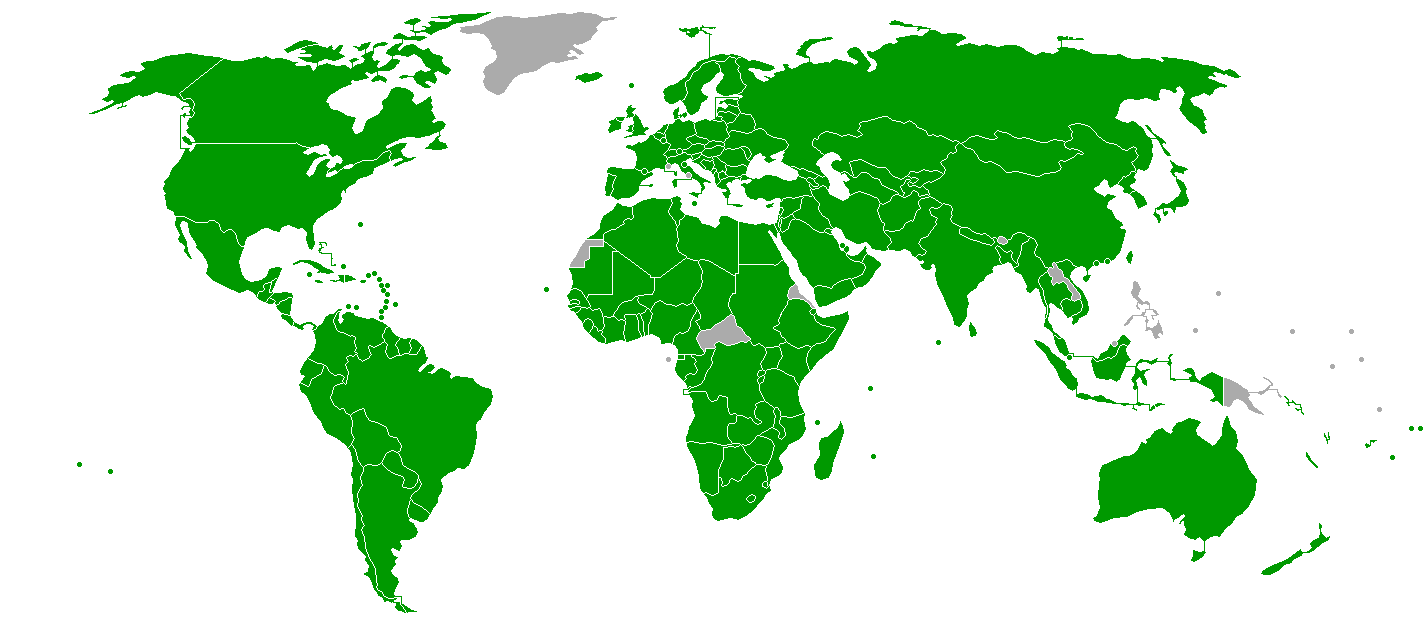
The 199 national football teams included in the game, shaded in green

The included teams were confirmed by Electronic Arts on 17 February 2010. The game contains 199 of the 204 national teams that took part in the 2010 FIFA World Cup qualification phase. Electronic Arts stated that they have included every team that FIFA have permitted them to use, with some others not being allowed for "various reasons". The five teams that were in the draw for World Cup qualifying but are not included in the game are the Central African Republic, Eritrea, and São Tomé and Príncipe from Africa, and Asian teams Bhutan and Guam. All five withdrew from the qualifying stage before it began. Additionally, the game does not feature Brunei, Laos, Papua New Guinea, and the Philippines, as they did not participate in World Cup qualification.

The game includes all 10 venues used at the 2010 FIFA World Cup, as well as stadiums from each qualifying region and a range of "generic" stadiums.

== Background ==
=== Development ===
2010 FIFA World Cup South Africa was in development for 12 months, and had two separate teams working on it: gameplay team and core team. The gameplay team was led by Gary Patterson, the creative director for FIFA games. Meanwhile, the core team designed the game modes and audio/visual presentation, among other things. EA Sports wanted to shape World Cup in a way that it would be able to match FIFA 10. They decided to release it as a standalone game, rather than downloadable content, citing the size, scope, and the uniqueness of the covered event.

Because the game focused on a single event, EA Sports was trying to secure complete authenticity by working with FIFA and the host nation. Several members went to South Africa and recorded the vuvuzela noise during actual football games in order to capture the atmosphere. Adding to the variety, each nation got its own fully rendered crowd in-game. The developers were also influenced by African themes in other areas, such as the soundtrack and menus.

=== Release ===
The game was announced on 26 January 2010 in a GameSpot interview with the line producer of the game, Simon Humber, with a slated release date for 27 April 2010 in North America, and 30 April 2010, in Asia and Europe.

A playable demo was released for Xbox 360 and PlayStation 3 on 8 April 2010. It includes Italy and Spain as the playable teams, and the ability to upload video replays to EA Football World.

The game was pulled from Saudi Arabia due to the soccer ball being translated as Allah, which referred to God in the Arabic language, as Saudi players did not kick it due to political and religious reasons.

=== Soundtrack ===
The 2010 FIFA World Cup soundtrack consists of 28 tracks by artists from 21 countries. According to Electronic Arts, it is intended to be a soundtrack that "celebrates the cultural vibrancy of the first FIFA World Cup to be held in Africa". The headline track is "Wavin' Flag (Coca-Cola Celebration Mix)" by K'naan.

=== Reception ===
Reception

Aggregate scores
| Aggregator | Score | | | | |
| Aggregator | iOS | PS3 | PSP | Wii | Xbox 360 |
|---|---|---|---|---|---|
| GameRankings | 62.50% | 82.82% | 71.50% | 69% | 83.43% |
| Metacritic | N/A | 82/100 | 69/100 | 70/100 | 83/100 |

Review scores
| Publication | Score | | | | |
| Publication | iOS | PS3 | PSP | Wii | Xbox 360 |
|---|---|---|---|---|---|
| Destructoid | N/A | N/A | N/A | N/A | 8/10 |
| Eurogamer | N/A | 8/10 | N/A | N/A | 8/10 |
| Game Informer | N/A | 8.5/10 | N/A | N/A | 8.5/10 |
| GameRevolution | N/A | A− | N/A | N/A | A− |
| GameSpot | N/A | 8.5/10 | 7.5/10 | 7/10 | 8.5/10 |
| GameTrailers | N/A | N/A | N/A | N/A | 9/10 |
| GameZone | N/A | 8.5/10 | N/A | 5/10 | N/A |
| IGN | 4.5/10 | (UK) 8.7/10 (US) 8.3/10 | 6/10 | 6.5/10 | (UK) 8.7/10 (US) 8.3/10 |
| The Daily Telegraph | N/A | N/A | N/A | N/A | 8/10 |

The game was met with positive to mixed reception. GameRankings and Metacritic gave it a score of 83.43% and 83 out of 100 for the Xbox 360 version; 82.82% and 82 out of 100 for the PlayStation 3 version; 71.50% and 69 out of 100 for the PSP version; 69% and 70 out of 100 for the Wii version; and 62.50% for the iOS version.

==== Sales ====
As of May 2010, the game had sold nearly 2 million units worldwide.

=== Legacy ===
As of 2022, the game is generally considered to be the best of the modern EA Sports FIFA World Cup video games, as well as one of the greatest football games of all time.
