= 2013 COSAFA Cup squads =

Below are the squads for the 2013 COSAFA Cup, which took place from 6 July to 20 July 2013. The player's age and clubs are as of the opening day of the tournament. Players marked (c) were named as captain for their national team for the tournament.

== Angola ==
For the development of Angola's Olympic team, all players for this tournament are under-23.

Head coach: (Uruguay) Gustavo Ferrín

No.	Pos.	Player	Date of birth (age)	Club
1	GK	Nelson	31 December 1992 (aged 20)	(Angolan Football Federation) Petro Atlético
2	DF	Chonene	30 December 1994 (aged 18)	(Angolan Football Federation) Onze Bravos
3	DF	Ary	6 August 1992 (aged 20)	(Angolan Football Federation) Recreativo do Libolo
4	DF	Abdul	7 April 1994 (aged 19)	(Angolan Football Federation) Petro Atlético
5	DF	Vado	20 May 1993 (aged 20)	(Angolan Football Federation) ASA
6	DF	Gui	14 September 1993 (aged 19)	(Angolan Football Federation) Norberto de Castro
7	MF	Eddy	7 March 1994 (aged 19)	(Angolan Football Federation) Petro Atlético
8	MF	Ito	29 November 1994 (aged 18)	(Angolan Football Federation) Progresso do Sambizanga
9	MF	Ary Papel	6 May 1994 (aged 19)	(Angolan Football Federation) Primeiro de Agosto
10	FW	Filhão	14 June 1995 (aged 18)	(Angolan Football Federation) Petro Atlético
11	MF	Diógenes Capemba	1 January 1997 (aged 16)	(Angolan Football Federation) Petro Atlético
12	GK	Mig	11 January 1993 (aged 20)	(Angolan Football Federation) Petro Atlético
13	MF	Belito	16 October 1996 (aged 16)	(Angolan Football Federation) Primeiro de Agosto
14	MF	Mano	12 August 1991 (aged 21)	(Angolan Football Federation) Petro Atlético
15	MF	Carlinhos	19 March 1993 (aged 20)	(Angolan Football Federation) Petro Atlético
16	MF	Almeida	20 May 1993 (aged 19)	(Angolan Football Federation) São Salvador
17	MF	Lírio		(Angolan Football Federation) Benfica de Luanda
18	FW	Mabululu	1 June 1992 (aged 21)	(Angolan Football Federation) Petro Atlético

== Botswana ==
Head coach: (Botswana) Stanley Tshosane

No.	Pos.	Player	Date of birth (age)	Caps	Club
1	GK	Noah Maposa	3 June 1985 (aged 28)		(Botswana) Gaborone United
2	DF	Ndiyapo Letsholathebe	25 February 1983 (aged 30)		(Botswana) Defence Force XI
3	FW	Gift Moyo	20 August 1990 (aged 22)		(Botswana) Nico United
4	DF	Gaopatwe Seosenyeng	25 January 1988 (aged 25)		(Botswana) Gaborone United
5	DF	Mompati Thuma	5 April 1980 (aged 33)		(Botswana) Defence Force XI
6	MF	Topo Piet	31 December 1988 (aged 24)		(Botswana) Nico United
7	MF	Dirang Moloi	15 July 1986 (aged 26)		(Democratic Republic of the Congo) CS Don Bosco
8	MF	Phenyo Mongala	10 June 1985 (aged 28)		(Democratic Republic of the Congo) CS Don Bosco
9	FW	Jerome Ramatlhakwane	29 October 1985 (aged 27)		(Democratic Republic of the Congo) CS Don Bosco
10	FW	Moemedi Moatlhaping	14 July 1985 (aged 27)		(Botswana) Gaborone United
12	MF	Jackie Mothatego	18 February 1987 (aged 26)		(Botswana) Gaborone United
13	MF	Alphonse Modisaotsile	30 January 1985 (aged 28)		(Botswana) Gaborone United
14	DF	Oscar Ncenga	27 February 1984 (aged 29)		(Botswana) Township Rollers
16	GK	Mwampole Masule	5 September 1991 (aged 21)		(Botswana) Township Rollers
18	DF	Moshe Gaolaolwe	25 December 1993 (aged 19)		(Botswana) BMC
19	FW	Lemponye Tshireletso	26 August 1987 (aged 25)		(Botswana) Defence Force XI
20	DF	Edwin Olerile	15 July 1986 (aged 26)		(Botswana) Township Rollers
21	DF	Tshepo Motlhabankwe	17 March 1981 (aged 32)		(Botswana) Mochudi Centre Chiefs
22	DF	Pako Lekgari	27 December 1987 (aged 25)		(Namibia) Black Africa
23	GK	Michael Pepukani	29 April 1989 (aged 24)		(Botswana) Defence Force XI

== Kenya ==
Head coach: (Algeria) Adel Amrouche

No.	Pos.	Player	Date of birth (age)	Caps	Club
1	GK	Duncan Ochieng	31 August 1978 (aged 34)		(Kenya) Sofapaka
2	DF	Jockins Atudo	8 August 1985 (aged 27)		(Tanzania) Azam
3	DF	Aboud Omar	9 September 1992 (aged 20)		(Kenya) Tusker
4	DF	David Ochieng	17 October 1992 (aged 20)		(Kenya) Tusker
5	DF	Musa Mohammed	6 June 1991 (aged 22)		(Kenya) Gor Mahia
6	MF	Andrew Murunga	20 October 1995 (aged 17)		(Kenya) Tusker
7	MF	Peter Opiyo	1 August 1986 (aged 26)		(Kenya) Tusker
9	FW	Kennedy Otieno	30 October 1989 (aged 23)		(Kenya) Thika United
10	MF	Francis Kahata	7 June 1991 (aged 22)		(Kenya) Thika United
11	MF	Paul Were	8 January 1988 (aged 25)		(Kenya) AFC Leopards
13	MF	Rama Salim	20 March 1993 (aged 20)		(Kenya) Gor Mahia
14	DF	James Situma	11 November 1984 (aged 28)		(Kenya) Sofapaka
15	DF	David Owino	5 April 1988 (aged 25)		(Kenya) Gor Mahia
16	MF	Teddy Akumu	20 October 1992 (aged 20)		(Kenya) Gor Mahia
17	FW	Paul Kiongera	14 June 1993 (aged 20)		(Kenya) Gor Mahia
18	MF	Edward Seda	11 August 1992 (aged 20)		(Kenya) AFC Leopards
20	MF	Edwin Lavatsa	2 January 1993 (aged 20)		(Kenya) Gor Mahia
22	GK	Wilson Obungu	5 September 1984 (aged 28)		(Kenya) Bandari
23	GK	Jerim Onyango	18 November 1984 (aged 28)		(Kenya) Gor Mahia

== Lesotho ==
Head coach: (Lesotho) Leslie Notši

No.	Pos.	Player	Date of birth (age)	Caps	Club
1	GK	Liteboho Mokhehle	27 July 1987 (aged 25)		(Lesotho) Lioli
2	MF	Ralekoti Mokhahlane	3 June 1986 (aged 27)		(Liechtenstein) Balzers
3	DF	Basia Makepe	4 March 1991 (aged 22)		(Lesotho) Joy
4	MF	Motlalepula Mofolo	7 September 1986 (aged 26)		(Algeria) MC Saïda
5	DF	Moitheri Ntobo	14 November 1979 (aged 33)		(Lesotho) Lioli
6	DF	Tlali Maile	16 August 1987 (aged 25)		(Lesotho) Bantu
7	FW	Lehlomela Ramabele	14 April 1992 (aged 21)		(Botswana) Defence Force XI
8	MF	Molibeli Janefeke	25 September 1986 (aged 26)		Lesotho Defence Force
9	FW	Thapelo Tale	22 April 1988 (aged 25)		(Lesotho) Likhopo
10	FW	Katleho Moleko	28 August 1986 (aged 26)		(South Africa) Santos
11	MF	Tsoanelo Koetle	22 November 1992 (aged 20)		(Lesotho) Lioli
12	DF	Thabo Masualle	18 April 1985 (aged 28)		(Lesotho) Lioli
14	MF	Bushi Moletsane	2 January 1984 (aged 29)		(Lesotho) Lioli
15	MF	Litsepe Marabe	20 February 1992 (aged 21)		(Lesotho) Bantu
16	GK	Phasumane Kholuoe	29 April 1983 (aged 30)		Lesotho Correctional Services
17	MF	Jerry Kamela	17 May 1992 (aged 21)		(Lesotho) Joy
18	DF	Nkau Lerotholi	27 September 1990 (aged 22)		(Lesotho) Matlama
19	MF	Mabuti Potloane	15 January 1986 (aged 27)		(Lesotho) Linare
20	MF	Mojela Letsie	23 August 1984 (aged 28)		Lesotho Defence Force
22	FW	Tsepo Seturumane	6 July 1992 (aged 21)		(Lesotho) Lioli

== Malawi ==
Head coach: (Belgium) Tom Saintfiet

No.	Pos.	Player	Date of birth (age)	Club
1	GK	Simplex Nthala	24 February 1988 (aged 25)	(Mozambican Football Federation) Vilankulo
2	MF	Fisher Kondowe	11 June 1982 (aged 31)	(Football Association of Malawi) Big Bullets
3	DF	Moses Chavula	8 August 1985 (aged 27)	(Mozambican Football Federation) Costa do Sol
4	FW	Chiukepo Msowoya	23 September 1988 (aged 24)	(Mozambican Football Federation) Maxaquene
5	DF	James Sangala	20 August 1986 (aged 26)	(Angolan Football Federation) Benfica de Luanda
6	MF	Davie Banda	22 December 1983 (aged 29)	(Football Association of Malawi) Kamuzu Barracks
7	MF	Micium Mhone	19 June 1995 (aged 18)	(Football Association of Malawi) Blue Eagles
8	MF	Young Chimodzi Jr.	16 January 1987 (aged 26)	(Football Association of Malawi) Silver Strikers
9	DF	Douglas Chirambo	22 April 1990 (aged 23)	(Football Association of Malawi) Big Bullets
10	MF	Joseph Kamwendo (c)	23 October 1986 (aged 26)	(Mozambican Football Federation) Liga Muçulmana de Maputo
11	MF	Ndaziona Chatsalira	8 November 1992 (aged 20)	(Football Association of Malawi) Silver Strikers
12	MF	Chimango Kayira	28 September 1993 (aged 19)	(Football Association of Malawi) Big Bullets
13	MF	Frank Banda	12 January 1991 (aged 22)	(Football Association of Malawi) Silver Strikers
14	FW	Boniface Kaulesi	10 July 1994 (aged 19)	(Football Association of Malawi) Red Lions
15	DF	George Nyirenda	23 December 1995 (aged 17)	(Football Association of Malawi) Big Bullets
16	GK	Owen Chaima	16 February 1989 (aged 24)	(Football Association of Malawi) Big Bullets
17	FW	Jimmy Zakazaka	27 December 1984 (aged 28)	(South African Football Association) FC Cape Town
18	FW	Gastin Simukonda	26 February 1993 (aged 20)	(Football Association of Malawi) Moyale Barracks
19	DF	John Lanjesi	3 March 1991 (aged 22)	(Football Association of Malawi) CIVO United
20	DF	Bongani Kaipa	11 December 1993 (aged 19)	(Football Association of Malawi) Mighty Wanderers

== Mauritius ==
Head coach: (Mauritius) Akbar Patel

No.	Pos.	Player	Date of birth (age)	Caps	Club
1	GK	Ivahn Marie-Josée	4 November 1978 (aged 34)		(Mauritius) AS Vacoas-Phoenix
2	DF	Chandrayah Veeranah	23 March 1985 (aged 28)		(Mauritius) Curepipe Starlight
3	DF	Christopher Bazerque	1 March 1987 (aged 26)		(Mauritius) Petite Rivière Noire
4	DF	Joye Estazie	10 August 1984 (aged 28)		(Mauritius) AS Vacoas-Phoenix
5	DF	Cedric Permal	8 December 1991 (aged 21)		(Mauritius) AS Vacoas-Phoenix
6	MF	Christopher L'Enclume	2 March 1991 (aged 22)		(Mauritius) AS Port-Louis 2000
7	MF	Franco Hypolite	7 February 1988 (aged 25)		(Mauritius) Cercle de Joachim
8	MF	Colin Bell (captain)	17 February 1979 (aged 34)		(Mauritius) Pamplemousses
9	FW	Gurty Calambé	14 May 1990 (aged 23)		(Mauritius) Petite Rivière Noire
10	MF	Fabrice Pithia	7 May 1987 (aged 26)		(Mauritius) Curepipe Starlight
11	MF	Stéphane Pierre	12 October 1981 (aged 31)		(Mauritius) Petite Rivière Noire
12	MF	Menzy Coco	22 December 1989 (aged 23)		(Mauritius) AS Port-Louis 2000
13	DF	Denis Dookhee	30 April 1985 (aged 28)		(Mauritius) Cercle de Joachim
14	DF	Percy Buckland	29 August 1987 (aged 25)		(Mauritius) Cercle de Joachim
15	FW	Andy Patate	18 September 1989 (aged 23)		(Mauritius) Petite Rivière Noire
16	GK	Aboo Bakar Augustin	28 September 1983 (aged 29)		(Mauritius) Cercle de Joachim
17	MF	Fabien Pithia	7 May 1987 (aged 26)		(Mauritius) AS Port-Louis 2000
18	MF	Louis Guyand Chiffone	18 February 1988 (aged 25)		(Mauritius) Savanne
19	FW	Sewram Gobin	19 January 1983 (aged 30)		(Mauritius) AS Rivière du Rempart
20	MF	Luther Rose	22 March 1989 (aged 24)		(Mauritius) AS Port-Louis 2000

== Mozambique ==
Head coach: (Mozambique) João Chissano

No.	Pos.	Player	Date of birth (age)	Caps	Club
1	GK	Gervásio Cossa	24 April 1984 (aged 29)		(Mozambique) Costa do Sol
2	MF	Momed Hagi	29 May 1985 (aged 28)		(Mozambique) Liga Muçulmana
3	MF	Telinho	15 October 1988 (aged 24)		(Mozambique) Liga Muçulmana
4	MF	Beto	11 March 1991 (aged 22)		(Mozambique) Ferroviário de Nampula
5	DF	Chico Mioche	10 July 1985 (aged 27)		(Mozambique) Liga Muçulmana
6	MF	Alvarito	6 September 1982 (aged 30)		(Mozambique) Costa do Sol
7	MF	Nando	7 November 1984 (aged 28)		(Mozambique) Ferroviário de Nampula
8	MF	Manuelito	29 April 1989 (aged 24)		(Mozambique) Costa do Sol
9	FW	Reginaldo Faife	4 June 1990 (aged 23)		(Mozambique) Liga Muçulmana
10	FW	Sonito	10 August 1985 (aged 27)		(Mozambique) Liga Muçulmana
11	FW	Mario Sinamunda	27 August 1990 (aged 22)		(Mozambique) Ferroviário da Beira
12	GK	Soarito	9 February 1984 (aged 29)		(Mozambique) HCB do Songo
13	DF	Dito	2 April 1986 (aged 27)		(Mozambique) Costa do Sol
14	MF	Diogo	1 March 1989 (aged 24)		(Mozambique) Ferroviario de Maputo
15	DF	João Mazive	12 April 1990 (aged 23)		(Mozambique) Costa do Sol
16	DF	Miró	30 April 1982 (aged 31)		(Mozambique) Liga Muçulmana
17	DF	Mambucho	16 September 1990 (aged 22)		(Mozambique) Ferroviario de Maputo
18	DF	Dario Khan	24 January 1984 (aged 29)		(Mozambique) Costa do Sol
19	DF	Calima	26 September 1987 (aged 25)		(Mozambique) Maxaquene
20	MF	Josemar Machaísse	7 August 1987 (aged 25)		(Mozambique) Liga Muçulmana

== Namibia ==
Head coach: (Namibia) Ricardo Mannetti

No.	Pos.	Player	Date of birth (age)	Club
2	DF	Denzil Haoseb	25 February 1991 (aged 22)	(Namibia Football Association) Black Africa
3	DF	Ananias Gebhardt	8 September 1988 (aged 24)	(Namibia Football Association) Tigers
4	DF	Willem Mwedihanga	7 January 1986 (aged 27)	(South African Football Association) AmaZulu
5	DF	Angula da Costa (c)	17 March 1987 (aged 26)	(Namibia Football Association) Black Africa
6	DF	Larry Horaeb	12 November 1991 (aged 21)	(Namibia Football Association) Ramblers
7	MF	Deon Hotto	29 October 1990 (aged 22)	(Namibia Football Association) African Stars
8	MF	Willy Stephanus	26 June 1991 (aged 22)	(Namibia Football Association) Black Africa
9	FW	Roger Katjiteo	26 March 1993 (aged 20)	(Namibia Football Association) Black Africa
10	MF	Riaan Cloete	30 November 1985 (aged 27)	(Namibia Football Association) African Stars
11	FW	Harold Ochurub	22 May 1983 (aged 30)	(Namibia Football Association) Mighty Gunners
12	DF	Chris Katjiukua	25 October 1986 (aged 26)	(Namibia Football Association) African Stars
13	MF	Emilio Martin	15 August 1990 (aged 22)	(Namibia Football Association) Ramblers
14	DF	Dennis Tjetjinda	23 March 1985 (aged 28)	(Namibia Football Association) African Stars
16	GK	Virgil Vries	29 March 1989 (aged 24)	(South African Football Association) Maritzburg United
17	FW	Sadney Urikhob	20 January 1992 (aged 21)	(South African Football Association) AmaZulu
19	MF	Petrus Shitembi	11 May 1992 (aged 21)	(South African Football Association) Pretoria University
20	MF	Neville Tjiueza	6 September 1993 (aged 19)	(Namibia Football Association) Tura Magic
21	FW	Pinehas Jakob	29 October 1985 (aged 27)	(Namibia Football Association) Tigers
22	DF	Freedom Puriza	22 June 1980 (aged 33)	(Namibia Football Association) African Stars
23	GK	Efriam Tjihonge	23 May 1986 (aged 27)	(South African Football Association) Milano United

== Seychelles ==
Head coach: (Netherlands) Jan Mak

No.	Pos.	Player	Date of birth (age)	Caps	Club
1	GK	Dave Mussard	3 February 1989 (aged 24)		(Seychelles) La Passe
2	DF	Yannick Manoo	7 July 1991 (aged 21)		(Seychelles) St Michel United
3	DF	Benoit Marie	26 December 1992 (aged 20)		(Seychelles) Côte d'Or
4	DF	Ronny Hoareau (c)	20 March 1983 (aged 30)		(Seychelles) Northern Dynamo
5	FW	Alex Nibourette	26 December 1983 (aged 29)		(Seychelles) St Michel United
6	DF	Steve Henriette	7 October 1987 (aged 25)		(Seychelles) St. Louis Suns United
7	MF	Achille Henriette	25 April 1987 (aged 26)		(Seychelles) La Passe
8	MF	Bernard St. Ange	6 August 1981 (aged 31)		(Seychelles) Côte d'Or
9	MF	Randolph Lablache	12 April 1985 (aged 28)		(Seychelles) The Lions
10	FW	Yves Zialor	7 May 1989 (aged 24)		(Seychelles) La Passe
11	MF	Darwin Rosette	19 January 1994 (aged 19)		(Seychelles) St Michel United
12	DF	Patrick Bonne	6 April 1989 (aged 24)		(Seychelles) St Michel United
13	MF	Colin Esther	29 January 1989 (aged 24)		(Seychelles) Côte d'Or
14	DF	Adrian Constance	21 December 1995 (aged 17)		(Seychelles) St Francis
15	DF	Ronny Marengo	1 August 1989 (aged 23)		(Seychelles) Northern Dynamo
16	FW	Nelson Laurence	19 October 1984 (aged 28)		(Seychelles) St Michel United
17	FW	Gervais Waye-Hive	11 June 1988 (aged 25)		(Seychelles) St Michel United
18	GK	Kitson Cécile	5 May 1984 (aged 29)		(Seychelles) Côte d'Or
19	FW	Bertrand Lablache	11 October 1987 (aged 25)		(Seychelles) Light Stars
20	GK	Jules Monnaie	16 July 1985 (aged 27)		(Seychelles) Northern Dynamo

== South Africa ==
Head coach: (South Africa) Gordon Igesund

No.	Pos.	Player	Date of birth (age)	Caps	Club
1	GK	Wayne Sandilands	23 August 1983 (aged 29)		(South Africa) Mamelodi Sundowns
2	DF	Tshepo Gumede	21 April 1991 (aged 22)		(South Africa) Platinum Stars
3	DF	Sibusiso Khumalo	9 August 1989 (aged 23)		(South Africa) SuperSport United
4	DF	Thulani Hlatshwayo	18 December 1989 (aged 23)		(South Africa) Ajax Cape Town
5	DF	Gladwin Shitolo	10 August 1989 (aged 23)		(South Africa) Jomo Cosmos
6	MF	Hlompho Kekana	23 May 1985 (aged 28)		(South Africa) Mamelodi Sundowns
7	MF	Sibusiso Msomi	31 December 1988 (aged 24)		(South Africa) Platinum Stars
8	DF	Buhle Mkhwanazi	1 February 1990 (aged 23)		(South Africa) University of Pretoria
9	FW	Katlego Mashego	18 May 1982 (aged 31)		(South Africa) Moroka Swallows
10	MF	Lerato Chabangu	15 August 1985 (aged 27)		(South Africa) Moroka Swallows
11	MF	Mandla Masango	18 July 1989 (aged 23)		(South Africa) Kaizer Chiefs
12	FW	Lebogang Manyana	13 September 1990 (aged 22)		(South Africa) Ajax Cape Town
13	MF	Ruzaigh Gamildien	4 April 1989 (aged 24)		(South Africa) Bloemfontein Celtic
14	DF	Bevan Fransman	31 October 1983 (aged 29)		(South Africa) SuperSport United
15	MF	Jabulani Shongwe	28 February 1990 (aged 23)		(South Africa) Mamelodi Sundowns
16	GK	Siyabonga Mpontshane	17 April 1986 (aged 27)		(South Africa) Platinum Stars
17	FW	Edward Manqele	18 August 1987 (aged 25)		(South Africa) Mamelodi Sundowns
18	FW	Thabani Mthembu	17 July 1994 (aged 18)		(South Africa) Platinum Stars
19	FW	Mzikayise Mashaba	13 January 1989 (aged 24)		(South Africa) Bidvest Wits
20	DF	Lehlohonolo Nonyane	7 December 1986 (aged 26)		(South Africa) Jomo Cosmos

== Swaziland ==
Head coach: (Belgium) Valerie Billen

No.	Pos.	Player	Date of birth (age)	Caps	Club
1	GK	Nhlanhla Gwebu	11 November 1986 (aged 26)		(Eswatini) Young Buffaloes
2	DF	Sifiso Mabila	2 January 1986 (aged 27)		(Eswatini) Mbabane Swallows
3	DF	Jerome Ntshalintshali	10 September 1984 (aged 28)		(Eswatini) Manzini Sundowns
4	MF	Lwazi Maziya	22 April 1983 (aged 30)		(Eswatini) Manzini Wanderers
5	MF	Vuyani Mazibuko	17 November 1984 (aged 28)		(Eswatini) Mbabane Highlanders
6	MF	Sibonginkosi Gamedze	26 December 1993 (aged 19)		(Eswatini) Mbabane Highlanders
7	FW	Wonder Nhleko	16 April 1981 (aged 32)		(Eswatini) Malanti Chiefs
8	DF	Mudeni Mamba	22 August 1993 (aged 19)		(Eswatini) Moneni Pirates
9	FW	Nhlanhla Kunene	6 November 1990 (aged 22)		(Eswatini) Malanti Chiefs
10	FW	Darren Christie	21 November 1984 (aged 28)		(Eswatini) Mbabane Swallows
11	MF	Mxolisi Lukhele	4 December 1991 (aged 21)		(Eswatini) Moneni Pirates
12	FW	Sifiso Vilakati	10 October 1988 (aged 24)		(Eswatini) Manzini Wanderers
13	FW	Nicholas Carrington	16 August 1990 (aged 22)		(Eswatini) Manzini Wanderers
14	DF	Dennis Fakudze	13 June 1983 (aged 30)		(Eswatini) Royal Leopards
15	FW	Sabelo Ndzinisa	31 July 1991 (aged 21)		(Eswatini) Mbabane Swallows
16	GK	Mphikeleli Dlamini	4 August 1983 (aged 29)		(Eswatini) Royal Leopards
17	MF	Zweli Mandia Nxumalo	23 May 1988 (aged 25)		(Eswatini) Royal Leopards
18	FW	Bonginkosi Sanele Dlamini	20 November 1990 (aged 22)		(Eswatini) Royal Leopards
19	DF	Sanele Mkhweli	26 April 1982 (aged 31)		(Eswatini) Mbabane Swallows
20	MF	Nkosingphile Tsabedze	9 September 1986 (aged 26)		(Eswatini) Young Buffaloes

== Zambia ==
Head coach: (France) Hervé Renard

No.	Pos.	Player	Date of birth (age)	Caps	Club
1	GK	Danny Munyao	2 November 1987 (aged 25)		(Zambia) Red Arrows
2	DF	Jimmy Chisenga	3 April 1992 (aged 21)		(Zambia) Red Arrows
3	DF	Fackson Kapumbu	6 October 1990 (aged 22)		(Zambia) Zanaco
4	MF	Kondwani Mtonga	12 February 1984 (aged 29)		(Zambia) ZESCO United
5	DF	Bronson Chama	4 March 1986 (aged 27)		(Zambia) Red Arrows
6	DF	Masauso Zimba	11 June 1992 (aged 21)		(Zambia) Nkana
7	MF	Bruce Musakanya	23 February 1994 (aged 19)		(Zambia) Red Arrows
8	FW	Brian Chewe	28 June 1993 (aged 20)		(Zambia) Konkola Blades
9	FW	Festus Mbewe	1 June 1988 (aged 25)		(Zambia) Nkana
10	FW	Bornwell Mwape	30 September 1991 (aged 21)		(Zambia) Nchanga Rangers
11	MF	Julius Situmbeko	4 April 1994 (aged 19)		(Zambia) Power Dynamos
12	DF	Kabaso Chongo	11 February 1992 (aged 21)		(Zambia) Konkola Mine Police
13	MF	Claude Bwalya			(Zambia) Konkola Blades
14	MF	Misheck Chaila	13 November 1990 (aged 22)		(Zambia) Konkola Blades
15	DF	Christopher Munthali	2 February 1991 (aged 22)		(Zambia) Nkana
16	GK	Joshua Titima	20 October 1992 (aged 20)		(Zambia) Power Dynamos
17	MF	Mukuka Mulenga	6 July 1993 (aged 20)		(Zambia) Power Dynamos
18	FW	Moses Phiri	6 March 1993 (aged 20)		(Zambia) Zanaco
19	MF	Sydney Kalume	10 January 1988 (aged 25)		(Zambia) Nkana
20	FW	Alex Ngonga	21 August 1992 (aged 20)		(Zambia) Nchanga Rangers

== Zimbabwe ==
Head coach: (Germany) Klaus Pagels

No.	Pos.	Player	Date of birth (age)	Caps	Club
1	GK	Munyaradzi Diya			(Zimbabwe) Highlanders
2	FW	Last Chibwiro	24 November 1985 (aged 27)		(Zimbabwe) Black Mambas
3	DF	Ocean Mushure	1 July 1985 (aged 28)		(Zimbabwe) Dynamos
4	MF	Nicholas Guyo	20 August 1994 (aged 18)		(Zimbabwe) Monomotapa United
5	DF	Hardlife Zvirekwi	5 May 1984 (aged 29)		(Zimbabwe) CAPS United
6	FW	Silas Songani	28 June 1989 (aged 24)		(Zimbabwe) Harare City
7	MF	Ronald Chitiyo	10 June 1992 (aged 21)		(Zimbabwe) Monomotapa United
8	DF	Erick Chipeta	28 June 1990 (aged 23)		(Zimbabwe) Hwange
9	DF	Prosper Matizanadzo	12 November 1979 (aged 33)		(Zimbabwe) Buffaloes
10	MF	Nicholas Alifandika	28 October 1989 (aged 23)		(Zimbabwe) Black Mambas
11	FW	Charles Sibanda	30 March 1985 (aged 28)		(Zimbabwe) Platinum
12	MF	Ali Sadiki	10 December 1987 (aged 25)		(Zimbabwe) Platinum
14	MF	Masimba Mambare (c)	9 May 1985 (aged 28)		(Zimbabwe) Highlanders
15	FW	Simba Sithole	10 January 1991 (aged 22)		(Zimbabwe) Dynamos
16	GK	Tafadzwa Dube	19 December 1984 (aged 28)		(Zimbabwe) CAPS United
17	MF	Devon Chafa	25 December 1990 (aged 22)		(Zimbabwe) Dynamos
18	FW	Tendai Ndoro	15 May 1985 (aged 28)		(Zimbabwe) Chicken Inn
20	FW	Lot Chiwunga	6 December 1986 (aged 26)		(Zimbabwe) Black Rhinos
21	DF	Felex Chindungwe	9 September 1982 (aged 30)		(Zimbabwe) Chicken Inn
23	GK	Maxwell Nyamupanedengu	26 October 1984 (aged 28)		(Zimbabwe) Harare City
