= SAA Supa 8 2007 =

2007 Supa 8
Tournament details
- Date: 4 August 2007 — 15 September 2007
- Teams: 8

Final positions
- Champions: Mamelodi Sundowns (14th title)
- Runners-up: Orlando Pirates

Tournament statistics
- Matches played: 7
- Goals scored: 16 (2.29 per match)

The SAA Supa 8 2007 was the 33rd edition of the competition featuring the top 8-placed teams at the conclusion of the 2005–06 Premier Soccer League season and the 5th and final season under its then sponsored name, the SAA Supa 8.

It was won by Mamelodi Sundowns, their first win in a domestic cup since 1999.

== Teams ==
The following 8 teams are listed according to their final position on the league table in the previous season of the 2006–07 Premier Soccer League.

1. Mamelodi Sundowns
2. Silver Stars
3. Moroka Swallows
4. Ajax Cape Town
5. Orlando Pirates
6. SuperSport United
7. Jomo Cosmos
8. Bloemfontein Celtic

== Quarter-finals ==
4 August 2007

| Mamelodi Sundowns | 4–1 | Bloemfontein Celtic |
|---|---|---|
| Surprise Moriri 23'; Benson Mhlongo 35'; Gift Leremi 44'; Manqoba Ngwenya 62' | | Petros Mahlatsi 47' |

5 August 2007

| Silver Stars | 1–1 (a.e.t.) | Jomo Cosmos |
|---|---|---|
| Simba Marumo 95' | | Lethola Mofokeng 108' |
Penalties
| | 4–5 |

18 August 2007

| Moroka Swallows | 1–2 | SuperSport United |
|---|---|---|
| Alton Meiring 8' | | Daine Klate 44' 50' |

19 August 2007

| Ajax Cape Town | 0–2 | Orlando Pirates |
|---|---|---|
| | | Bennett Chenene 72'; Rudzani Ramudzuli 90+2' |

== Semi–finals ==
29 August 2007

| Mamelodi Sundowns | 0–0 (a.e.t.) | Jomo Cosmos |
Penalties
| | 5–4 |

30 August 2007

| Orlando Pirates | 2–1 | SuperSport United |
|---|---|---|
| Joseph Makhanya 115'; Joseph Kamwendo 119' | | Katlego Mashego 116' |

== Final ==
15 September 2007

| Mamelodi Sundowns | 1–0 | Orlando Pirates |
|---|---|---|
| Carelse 15' | Report |

Kings Park Stadium, Durban
