= 2007 CAF Confederation Cup group stage =

Football tournament group stage

The group stage of the 2007 CAF Confederation Cup was played from 21 July to 7 October 2007. A total of eight teams competed in the group stage.

== Format ==
In the group stage, each group was played on a home-and-away round-robin basis. The winners of each group advanced directly to the final.

Key to colours in group tables
Group winners advance to the final

== Groups ==
=== Group A ===
Team	Pts	Pld	W	D	L	GF	GA	GD
(Tunisia) CS Sfaxien	13	6	4	1	1	13	4	+9
(Democratic Republic of the Congo) TP Mazembe	12	6	4	0	2	11	9	+2
(South Africa) Mamelodi Sundowns	6	6	2	0	4	7	13	-6
(Cameroon) Les Astres FC	4	6	1	1	4	5	10	-5

21 July 2007
20:10 SAST

Mamelodi Sundowns (South Africa)	3 – 2	(Democratic Republic of the Congo) TP Mazembe
Ngwenya 50'; Nyandoro 63'; Moriri 70'		Mputu 20', 40'

Loftus Versfeld Stadium, South Africa
Referee: Seechurn (Mauritius)

21 July 2007
15:00 WAT

Les Astres FC (Cameroon)	1 – 1	(Tunisia) CS Sfaxien
Okouda 10'		Nafti 38'

Stade de la Réunification, Cameroon
Referee: Agbovi (Ghana)

5 August 2007
15:00 CAT

TP Mazembe (Democratic Republic of the Congo)	2 – 1	(Cameroon) Les Astres FC
Mputu 1', 61'		Ekanga 18'

Kinshasa Stadium, Democratic Republic of the Congo
Referee: Mwanza (Zambia)

4 August 2007
20:00 CEST

CS Sfaxien (Tunisia)	4 – 0	(South Africa) Mamelodi Sundowns
Koissy 2', 28'; Mbele 8'; Soumah 90+4'

Taieb Mhiri Stadium, Tunisia
Referee: Banao (Burkina Faso)

18 August 2007
20:10 SAST

Mamelodi Sundowns (South Africa)	2 – 1	(Cameroon) Les Astres FC
Moriri 33'; Mhlongo 61'		Ossah 31'

Loftus Versfeld Stadium, South Africa
Referee: De Sousa (Angola)

19 August 2007
15:00 CAT

TP Mazembe (Democratic Republic of the Congo)	2 – 1	(Tunisia) CS Sfaxien
Kabangu 47'; Mputu 82'		Mbele 36'

Kinshasa Stadium, Democratic Republic of the Congo
Referee: Mathews (Namibia)

1 September 2007
15:00 WAT

Les Astres FC (Cameroon)	1 – 0	(South Africa) Mamelodi Sundowns
Djam

Stade de la Réunification, Cameroon
Referee: DOUE Noumandiez

1 September 2007
20:00 CEST

CS Sfaxien (Tunisia)	2 – 0	(Democratic Republic of the Congo) TP Mazembe
Rouid 1'; Nafti 75'

Taieb Mhiri Stadium, Tunisia
Referee: RASSAS Sabit

22 September 2007
21:45 CEST

CS Sfaxien (Tunisia)	3 – 0	(Cameroon) Les Astres FC

Tunisia

23 September 2007
15:30 CAT

TP Mazembe (Democratic Republic of the Congo)	3 – 1	(South Africa) Mamelodi Sundowns

Democratic Republic of the Congo

6 October 2007
20:10 SAST

Mamelodi Sundowns (South Africa)	1 – 2	(Tunisia) CS Sfaxien

South Africa

6 October 2007
15:00 WAT

Les Astres FC (Cameroon)	1 – 2	(Democratic Republic of the Congo) TP Mazembe

Cameroon

=== Group B ===
Team	Pts	Pld	W	D	L	GF	GA	GD
(Sudan) Al-Merrikh	10	6	3	1	2	13	8	+5
(Nigeria) Dolphins	10	6	3	1	2	8	7	+1
(Egypt) Ismaily SC	8	6	2	2	2	4	5	-1
(Nigeria) Kwara United	5	6	1	2	3	4	9	-5

22 July 2007
15:00 WAT

Dolphins (Nigeria)	2 – 0	(Nigeria) Kwara United
Olaiya 3'; Bello 90+2'

U. J. Esuene Stadium, Nigeria
Referee: Eyene (Cameroon)

22 July 2007
19:00 EEST

Ismaily SC (Egypt)	1 – 1	(Sudan) Al-Merrikh
Salem 81'		Paulinho 89'

Ismailia Stadium, Egypt
Referee: Girma (Ethiopian)

4 August 2007
15:00 WAT

Kwara United (Nigeria)	1 – 1	(Egypt) Ismaily SC
Weng 32'		Fadl 75'

Kwara State Stadium, Nigeria
Referee: Gil

4 August 2007
20:00 EAT

Al-Merrikh (Sudan)	6 – 1	(Nigeria) Dolphins
Ahmed 20'; Agab 39', 79'; Alzouma 65'; Idahor 77'; Safari 81'		Ezeji 48'

Al Merreikh Stadium, Sudan
Referee: Jamel

18 August 2007
16:00 WAT

Dolphins (Nigeria)	2 – 0	(Egypt) Ismaily SC

Liberation Stadium, Nigeria
Referee: Atsoo Kokou

18 August 2007
15:00 WAT

Kwara United (Nigeria)	2 – 1	(Sudan) Al-Merrikh
Obada 47'; Abidoye 80'		Idahor 30'

Kwara State Stadium Ilorin, Nigeria
Referee: Keita Yakhouba

2 September 2007
17:30 EEST

Ismaily SC (Egypt)	1 – 0	(Nigeria) Dolphins
Mostafa Karim 92'

Ismailia Stadium, Egypt
Referee: MWANDIKE Victor

1 September 2007
19:30 EAT

Al-Merrikh (Sudan)	4 – 1	(Nigeria) Kwara United
Ahmed 13'; Alsoudey 24'; Safari 44'; Paulinho 66'		90'

Al Merreikh Stadium, Sudan
Referee: JEDIDI Slim

22 September 2007
15:00 WAT

Kwara United (Nigeria)	0 – 0	(Nigeria) Dolphins

Kwara State Stadium Ilorin, Nigeria

23 September 2007
22:00 EAT

Al-Merrikh (Sudan)	1 – 0	(Egypt) Ismaily SC

Al Merreikh stadium, Sudan

7 October 2007
15:00 WAT

Dolphins (Nigeria)	3 – 0	(Sudan) Al-Merrikh
Jean-Paul Abalo 20' (own goal); Uwazoke Wobo 33'; Thankgod Amaefule 64' (pen.)

U.J. Esuene Stadium Calabar, Nigeria

7 October 2007
17:30 EET

Ismaily SC (Egypt)	1 – 0	(Nigeria) Kwara United

Egypt
