= Kgosietsile =

Kgosietsile is a masculine given name, and is an alternative form of Kgosi. Notable people with the name include:

- Kgosi Letlape (born Tebogo Kgosietsile Solomon Letlape), South African ophthalmologist
- Kgosietsile Mampori, Motswana footballer
- Kgosi Ntlhe (born Kgosietsile Ntlhe; 1994), South African footballer
- King Ndlovu (born Kgosietsile King Ndlovu; 1993), South African footballer
