= 2013 COSAFA Cup =

COSAFA Castle Cup

Tournament details
- Host country: Zambia
- Dates: 6–20 July 2013
- Teams: 13 (from 2 sub-confederations)
- Venues: 4 (in 3 host cities)

Final positions
- Champions: Zambia (4th title)
- Runners-up: Zimbabwe
- Third place: South Africa
- Fourth place: Lesotho

Tournament statistics
- Matches played: 20
- Goals scored: 56 (2.8 per match)
- Top scorer: (Botswana) Jerome Ramatlhakwane (4)
- Best player: (Zambia) Mukuka Mulenga
- Best goalkeeper: (Zambia) Daniel Munyau

The 2013 COSAFA Cup, sponsored by South African Breweries and officially named the 2013 COSAFA Castle Cup, was the 14th edition of the COSAFA Cup, an international football competition consisting of national teams of member nations of the Council of Southern Africa Football Associations (COSAFA). It was hosted by Zambia in July 2013.

== Participants ==
Comoros and Madagascar did not enter for unknown reasons. While Kenya and Tanzania, both members of the Council for East and Central Africa Football Associations (CECAFA) were invited.

On 17 May 2013, Tanzania withdrew, citing conflicting schedules with African Nations Championship qualifiers and the Kagame Interclub Cup. The Tanzanian and Ugandan Federations were unable to agree on a new date for the African Nations Championship qualifying game due to a conflict with the FUFA elections. Tanzania were replaced with Equatorial Guinea, a member of the Central African Football Federations' Union (UNIFFAC), but they withdrew from the competition on 24 June.

The FIFA World Rankings from 11 April 2013 were used to decide which teams receive a bye to the quarter-final stage.

Nation	FIFA Ranking	Bye
Zambia	45	Bye to quarter-final stage
South Africa	62	Bye to quarter-final stage
Angola	94	Bye to quarter-final stage
Zimbabwe	101	Bye to quarter-final stage
Mozambique	106	Bye to quarter-final stage
Malawi	109	Bye to quarter-final stage
~~Tanzania~~	~~116~~	No bye Teams start in group stage
~~Equatorial Guinea~~	~~59~~	No bye Teams start in group stage
Kenya	122	No bye Teams start in group stage
Botswana	122	No bye Teams start in group stage
Namibia	125	No bye Teams start in group stage
Lesotho	156	No bye Teams start in group stage
Swaziland	183	No bye Teams start in group stage
Mauritius	189	No bye Teams start in group stage
Seychelles	199	No bye Teams start in group stage

== Venues ==
Prior to the start of the competition, the Zambian government did not provide funds to make the Godfrey 'Ucar' Chitalu 107 Stadium in Kabwe suitable for the competition. As a result, those games were relocated to the Nkana Stadium in Kitwe.

== Group stage ==
All times listed are local (UTC+2).

=== Group A ===
Team	Pld	W	D	L	GF	GA	GD	Pts
Namibia	2	2	0	0	6	3	+3	6
Mauritius	2	1	0	1	5	2	+3	3
Seychelles	2	0	0	2	2	8	−6	0

6 July 2013
14:30

Namibia	2–1	Mauritius
Shitembi 20'; Jakob 45'	Report	Pierre 85'

Nkoloma Stadium, Lusaka
Referee: Janny Sikazwe (Zambia)

8 July 2013
14:30

Namibia	4–2	Seychelles
Urikhob 25'; Gebhardt 40', 46'; Tjiueza 88'	Report	Zialor 14', 38'

Nkoloma Stadium, Lusaka
Referee: Osiase Koto (Lesotho)

10 July 2013
15:00

Mauritius	4–0	Seychelles
Calambé 14'; Pierre 23', 74'; L.L. Pithia 36'	Report

Nkana Stadium, Kitwe
Referee: Victor Gomes (South Africa)

=== Group B ===
Team	Pld	W	D	L	GF	GA	GD	Pts
Lesotho	3	1	2	0	7	5	+2	5
Botswana	3	1	2	0	5	4	+1	5
Kenya	3	1	1	1	5	4	+1	4
Swaziland	3	0	1	2	0	4	−4	1

7 July 2013
17:00

Botswana	0–0	Swaziland
	Report

Arthur Davies Stadium, Kitwe
Referee: Bernard Camille (Seychelles)
8 July 2013^{†}
17:00

Kenya	2–2	Lesotho
Kiongera 82'; Atudo 89' (pen.)	Report	Mokhahalane 43' (pen.); Tale 52'

Arthur Davies Stadium, Kitwe
Referee: Victor Gomes (South Africa)

9 July 2013
15:00

Kenya	2–0	Swaziland
Lavatsa 5', 54'	Report

Arthur Davies Stadium, Kitwe
Referee: Samuel Chirinda (Mozambique)
9 July 2013
17:00

Lesotho	3–3	Botswana
Mokhahlane 60' (pen.); Lerotholi 68'; Tale 90+2'	Report	Ramatlhakwane 5', 50', 79'

Arthur Davies Stadium, Kitwe
Referee: Dennis Nguluwe (Malawi)

11 July 2013
15:00

Kenya	1–2	Botswana
Olerile 87' (o.g.)	Report	Tshireletso 12'; Ramatlhakwane 90+4'

Nkana Stadium, Kitwe
Referee: Bernard Camille (Seychelles)
11 July 2013
15:00

Lesotho	2–0	Swaziland
Letsie 23'; Seturumane 45'	Report

Nkoloma Stadium, Lusaka
Referee: Norman Matemera (Zimbabwe)

^{†}This fixture was originally scheduled to take place on 7 July at 15:00 (UTC+2). However, Kenya's arrival at the tournament was delayed due to the players' league commitments.

== Knockout stage ==
=== Bracket ===
Zambia, South Africa, Angola, Zimbabwe, Mozambique, and Malawi received a bye to this stage.

Quarter-finals
13 July – Lusaka
Zimbabwe (p)	1 (3)
Malawi	1 (1)
14 July – Kabwe
Angola	1 (3)
Lesotho (p)	1 (5)
13 July – Lusaka
South Africa	2
Namibia	1
14 July – Kabwe
Zambia	3
Mozambique	1

Semi-finals
17 July – Ndola
Zimbabwe	2
Lesotho	1
17 July – Ndola
South Africa	0 (3)
Zambia (p)	0 (5)

Final
20 July – Ndola
Zimbabwe	0
Zambia	2
Third place play-off
20 July – Ndola
Lesotho	1
South Africa	2

=== Quarter-finals ===
13 July 2013
13:00

Zimbabwe	1–1	Malawi
Mambare 14'	Report	Nyamupanedengu 86' (o.g.)
Penalties
Chafa (penalty scored); Chipeta (penalty scored); Chiwunga (penalty missed); Mushura (penalty scored)	3–1	(penalty missed) Kaipa; (penalty scored) Msowoya; (penalty missed) Simkonda; (penalty missed) Lanjesi

Nkoloma Stadium, Lusaka
Referee: Janny Sikazwe (Zambia)
13 July 2013
15:30

South Africa	2–1	Namibia
Shongwe 48'; Kekana 63'	Report	Stephanus 73' (pen.)

Nkoloma Stadium, Lusaka
Referee: Joshua Bondo (Botswana)

14 July 2013
13:00

Angola	1–1	Lesotho
Mabululu 25'		Tale 40'
Penalties
Abdul (penalty scored); Diógenes (penalty scored); Ito (penalty scored); Mano (penalty missed)	3–5	(penalty scored) Maile; (penalty scored) Mokhahlane; (penalty scored) Seturumane; (penalty scored) Moletsane; (penalty scored) Moleko

Nkana Stadium, Kitwe
Referee: Victor Gomes (South Africa)
14 July 2013
15:30

Zambia	3–1	Mozambique
Mwape 13' (pen.); Chisenga 27'; Phiri 77'	Report	Sonito 86'

Nkana Stadium, Kitwe
Referee: Bernard Camille (Seychelles)

=== Plate competition ===
Semi-finals
16 July – Kitwe
Malawi	2
Angola	3
16 July – Kitwe
Namibia	0
Mozambique	1

Final
18 July – Kitwe
Angola	0
Mozambique	1

==== Plate semi-final ====
16 July 2013
14:00

Malawi	2–3	Angola
Simkonda 5'; Ito 48' (o.g.)		Mabululu 11', 54'; Abdul 84'

Arthur Davies Stadium, Kitwe
Referee: Osiase Koto (Lesotho)
16 July 2013
16:00

Namibia	0–1	Mozambique
		Sonito 43'

Arthur Davies Stadium, Kitwe
Referee: Norman Matemera (Zimbabwe)

==== Plate final ====
18 July 2013
15:00

Angola	0–1	Mozambique
		Sonito 45'

Nkana Stadium, Kitwe
Referee: Dennis Nguluwe (Malawi)

=== Semi-finals ===
17 July 2013
17:00

Zimbabwe	2–1	Lesotho
Ndoro 15', 25'	Report	Mofolo 4'

Levy Mwanawasa Stadium, Ndola
Referee: Samuel Chirinda (Mozambique)
17 July 2013
20:00

South Africa	0–0 (a.e.t.)	Zambia
	Report
Penalties
Hlatshwayo (penalty scored); Manyama (penalty scored); Chabangu (penalty missed); Mashaba (penalty scored)	3–5	(penalty scored) Ngonga; (penalty scored) Mwape; (penalty scored) Phiri; (penalty scored) Chongo; (penalty scored) Chama

Levy Mwanawasa Stadium, Ndola
Referee: Joshua Bondo (Botswana)

=== Third place play-off ===
20 July 2013
13:00

Lesotho	1–2	South Africa
Maile 22' (pen.)	Report	Masango 44'; Kekana 54'

Levy Mwanawasa Stadium, Ndola
Referee: Joshua Bondo (Botswana)

=== Final ===
20 July 2013
15:30

Zimbabwe	0–2	Zambia
	Report	Ngonga 5'; Chongo 90+2'

Levy Mwanawasa Stadium, Ndola
Referee: Bernard Camille (Seychelles)

== Awards ==
The following were the individual awards:

Most Valuable Player	Golden Shoe	Best Goalkeeper
(Zambia) Mukuka Mulenga	(Botswana) Jerome Ramatlhakwane	(Zambia) Daniel Munyau

== Goalscorers ==
4 goals

- (Botswana) Jerome Ramatlhakwane

3 goals

- (Angola) Mabululu
- (Lesotho) Thapelo Tale
- (Mauritius) Jean Stephan Pierre
- (Mozambique) Sonito

2 goals

- (Kenya) Edwin Lavatsa
- (Lesotho) Ralekoti Mokhahlane
- (Namibia) Ananias Gebhardt
- (Seychelles) Yves Zialor
- (South Africa) Hlompho Kekana
- (Zimbabwe) Tendai Ndoro

1 goal

- (Angola) Abdul
- (Botswana) Lemponye Tshireletso
- (Kenya) Jockins Atudo
- (Kenya) Paul Kiongera
- (Lesotho) Nkau Lerotholi
- (Lesotho) Phillip Letsie
- (Lesotho) Tlali Maile
- (Lesotho) Motlalepula Mofolo
- (Lesotho) Tsepo Seturumane
- (Malawi) Gastin Simkonda
- (Mauritius) Gurty Calambé
- (Mauritius) Fabrice Pithia
- (Namibia) Pinehas Jakob
- (Namibia) Petrus Shitembi
- (Namibia) Willy Stephanus
- (Namibia) Neville Tjiueza
- (Namibia) Sadney Urikhob
- (South Africa) Mandla Masango
- (South Africa) Jabulani Shongwe
- (Zambia) Jimmy Chisenga
- (Zambia) Kabaso Chongo
- (Zambia) Bornwell Mwape
- (Zambia) Alex Ngonga
- (Zambia) Moses Phiri
- (Zimbabwe) Masimba Mambare

1 own goal

- (Angola) Ito (playing against Malawi)
- (Botswana) Edwin Olerile (playing against Kenya)
- (Zimbabwe) Maxwell Nyamupanedengu (playing against Malawi)
