= Letlape =

Letlape is a surname. Notable people with the surname include:

- Kgosi Letlape, South African ophthalmologist
- Sharon Letlape, South African politician
