= ZCS =

ZCS may refer to:

- ZCS government agency responsible for prisons and correctional centers in Zambia.
- Zimbra (Zimbra Collaboration Suite), a groupware product
- Zero code suppression, a telecommunications technology
- Zero-current switching, a technology used in switched-mode power supplies
