= Lovemore =

Lovemore is both a surname and a given name. Notable people with the name include:

Surname:

- Annette Lovemore, South African politician, currently Shadow Deputy Minister of Home Affairs
- Sean Lovemore (born 1992), New Zealand football (soccer) player
- Tayla Lovemore (born 1995), South African swimmer

Given name:

- Lovemore Madhuku, Zimbabwean politician and democracy activist
- Lovemore Majaivana (born 1954), Zimbabwean musician, Ndebele singer
- Lovemore Matombo, the President of the Zimbabwe Congress of Trade Unions (ZCTU)
- Lovemore Mokgweetsi (born 1974), Botswana footballer
- Lovemore Moyo (born 1965), Zimbabwean politician, Speaker of the House of Assembly of Zimbabwe
- Charles Lovemore Mungoshi (born 1947), writer from Zimbabwe
- Lovemore N'dou (born 1971), Australian based South African boxer
