= Mpoeleng Mpoeleng =

Motswana footballer (born 1980)

Personal information
- Full name: Mpoeleng Mpoeleng
- Date of birth: 20 May 1980 (age 46)
- Place of birth: Tumasera, Botswana
- Position: Defender

Team information
- Current team: Mochudi Centre Chiefs

Senior career*
| Years | Team | Apps | (Gls) |
| 2009– | Mochudi Centre Chiefs | | |

International career^{‡}
| 2009– | Botswana | 4 | (0) |
- * Club domestic league appearances and goals ‡ National team caps and goals as of 11:09, 21 December 2009 (UTC)

Mpoeleng Mpoeleng (born 20 May 1980) is a Motswana former footballer who has four caps for the Botswana national football team.
