= Ngwenya (disambiguation) =

Ngwenya is a town in Eswatini.

Ngwenya may also refer to:

- Ngwenya (surname)
- Ngwenya Mine, mine in Eswatini.
- Ngwenya Lodge, a prestigious vacation resort on the southern banks of the Crocodile River, adjoining the Kruger National Park in South Africa.
