= 2005–06 South African Premiership =

Premiership
- Season: 2005–06
- Champions: Mamelodi Sundowns; 3rd Premiership title
- Relegated: Bush Bucks; Free State Stars
- 2007 CAF Champions League: Mamelodi Sundowns
- Matches: 240
- Goals: 549 (2.29 per match)
- Top goalscorer: Mame Niang (14)
- Average attendance: 6,358

The 2005–06 South African Premiership, known as the Castle Premiership for sponsorship purposes, and also commonly referred to as the PSL after the governing body, was the tenth season of the Premiership since its establishment in 1996.

It was won by Mamelodi Sundowns.

== Final table ==
Pos	Team	Pld	W	D	L	GF	GA	GD	Pts	Qualification or relegation
1	Mamelodi Sundowns (Note: Qualified for the 2007 CAF Champions League and the 2007 CAF Confederation Cup) (C)	30	16	9	5	45	19	+26	57	
2	Orlando Pirates	30	14	12	4	39	24	+15	54	
3	Kaizer Chiefs	30	12	14	4	39	26	+13	50	
4	Moroka Swallows	30	12	10	8	39	33	+6	46	
5	Silver Stars	30	11	9	10	34	32	+2	42	
6	Golden Arrows	30	9	13	8	32	28	+4	40	
7	Supersport United	30	10	10	10	43	41	+2	40	
8	Santos	30	7	17	6	35	32	+3	38	
9	Jomo Cosmos	30	10	8	12	31	32	−1	38	
10	Bloemfontein Celtic	30	9	10	11	35	37	−2	37	
11	Ajax Cape Town	30	8	11	11	40	42	−2	35	
12	Black Leopards	30	9	7	14	31	39	−8	34	
13	Dynamos	30	7	10	13	24	38	−14	31	
14	Classic	30	7	9	14	23	37	−14	30	
15	Bush Bucks (R)	30	6	12	12	25	48	−23	30	Qualification for the relegation play-offs
16	Free State Stars (R)	30	4	17	9	34	41	−7	29	Relegated

Source: rsssf.com
(C) Champions; (R) Relegated
Notes:

Tembisa Classic sold their status to Maritzburg United in September 2005.

== Premier League awards ==
- Player of the Season: Surprise Moriri (Mamelodi Sundowns)
- Players' Player of the Season: Surprise Moriri
- Coach of the Season: Owen da Gama (Silver Stars)
- Lesley Manyathela Golden Boot Award: Mame Niang (Moroka Swallows)
- Finest Moment of the Season: Esrom Nyandoro (Mamelodi Sundowns)
- Perfectly Balanced Team of the Season: Moroka Swallows
- Referees of the Season: Andile Ncobo and Abdul Ebrahim
- Assistant Referee of the Season: Toko Malebo
- Photographer of the Season: Lefty Shivambu
- Print Personality of the Season: Vincent Mashego
- Radio Personality of the Season: Connie Matjipa
- Supporters Recognition Award: Bloemfontein Celtic
- Bo Moseneke Award: Robert Marawa and Thomas Mlambo

== Top goalscorers ==
Goals	Player	Team
14	(Senegal) Mame Niang	Moroka Swallows
13	(South Africa) Alton Meiring	Golden Arrows
12	(South Africa) Abram Raselemane	Supersport United
11	(Zambia) Chris Katongo	Jomo Cosmos
11	(South Africa) Surprise Moriri	Mamelodi Sundowns
10	(South Africa) Moses Spandeel	Bloemfontein Celtic
9	(South Africa) Katlego Mphela	Supersport United
9	(South Africa) Rudzani Ramudzuli	Black Leopards
9	(South Africa) Mpho Maleka	Dynamos
8	(Botswana) Dipsy Selolwane	Santos
8	(South Africa) Siphiwe Tshabalala	Free State Stars
8	(South Africa) Sandile Ndlovu	Mamelodi Sundowns

Last updated: 30 May 2006
Source: PSL official website
