= Mokgweetsi =

Mokgweetsi is both a masculine given name and surname. Notable people with the name include:

== Given name ==
- Mokgweetsi Masisi (born 1961), Motswana politician

== Surname ==
- Lovemore Mokgweetsi (born 1974), Motswana footballer
