= 2013 Mascom Top 8 Cup =

Second edition of the Mascom Top 8 Cup

Tournament details
- Country: Botswana
- Dates: 23 February – 18 May 2013
- Teams: 8

Final positions
- Champions: Gaborone United (1st title)
- Runners-up: BDF XI

Tournament statistics
- Matches played: 13
- Goals scored: 48 (3.69 per match)

The 2013 Mascom Top 8 Cup, also known as the Mascom Top 8 Cup Season 2 for sponsorship reasons, was the second edition of the Mascom Top 8 Cup. It was played from 23 February to 18 May 2013 by the top teams from the 2011-12 Botswana Premier League. It was won by Gaborone United.

== History ==
The 2013 tournament was played from February to May instead of May to July like the previous tournament. It was the only tournament to take place in Botswana for the season, since the 2013 FA Challenge Cup was not played, therefore the winner represented the country in the CAF Confederation Cup. Mogoditshane Fighters was the only debutant in the tournament.

== Prize money ==
The prize money was kept the same for the winners from the 2012 competition, but was increased for the rest of the competitors from the inaugural edition of the cup.

- Champions: P1 000 000
- Runners up: P400 000
- Semifinalists: P200 000
- Quarterfinalists: P125 000

== Format ==
The quarterfinals and semifinals were played over two legs both home and away, with only one final in a predetermined venue. Three points were awarded for a win, one point for a draw and none for a loss. Aggregate score was used to determine the winner of a round. Where the aggregate score was equal away goals were used to pick out the victor and if those were equal the tied teams went into a penalty shootout. For the 2012-13 edition there was no quarterfinal draw. The teams were seeded based on their position in the table, with the first placed Mochudi Centre Chiefs facing off against eighth placed Mogoditshane Fighters.

== Participants ==
Team	Location	League position
Mochudi Centre Chiefs	Mochudi	1
BMC	Lobatse	2
Township Rollers	Gaborone	3
Gaborone United	Gaborone	4
Nico United	Selibe Phikwe	5
ECCO City Greens	Francistown	6
BDF XI	Mogoditshane	7
Mogoditshane Fighters	Mogoditshane	8

== Quarterfinals ==
All quarterfinal matches were played at Molepolole Sports Complex.

First legs
Date	Home	Score	Away
February 23	Township Rollers	2-1	ECCO City Greens
February 23	Gaborone United	2-1	Nico United
February 24	Mochudi Centre Chiefs	1-3	Mogoditshane Fighters
February 24	BMC	0-1	BDF XI

Second legs
Date	Home	Score	Away
March 9	Mogoditshane Fighters	1-4	Mochudi Centre Chiefs
March 9	BDF XI	2-2	BMC
March 10	ECCO City Greens	1-2	Township Rollers
March 10	Nico United	0-2	Gaborone United

== Semifinals ==
First legs
Date	Home	Score	Away
April 13	Township Rollers	1-4	Gaborone United
April 14	BDF XI	4-1	Mochudi Centre Chiefs

Second legs
Date	Home	Score	Away
April 27	Mochudi Centre Chiefs	2-4	BDF XI
April 28	Gaborone United	2-2	Township Rollers

== Final ==
The final pitted Gaborone United against BDF XI at the New Lobatse Stadium. Gaborone United took a 2–0 lead in the second half before BDF XI's goalkeeper was sent off. The substitute goalkeeper saved the penalty, and ten-man BDI XI scored with 12 minutes to play, but down a man could not find an equaliser.

Final
Date	Winner	Score	Runners up
May 18	Gaborone United	2-1	BDF XI
