= Mussard =

Mussard is a French surname. Notable people with the surname include:

- Dave Mussard (born 1987), Seychellois football player and chef
- Geoffroy Mussard, known as Shurik'n (born 1966), French rapper from Marseille
- Martin Mussard, known as Naâman (1990–2025), French reggae singer and musician
- Pascale Mussard (born 1957), French businesswoman
- Raphaël Mussard, known as Faf Larage (born 1971), French rapper

== Other uses ==
- Mussard Cave, a mountain cave on the island of Réunion
