= Mofokeng =

Mofokeng is a South African surname. It may refer to the following notable people:

- Gabriel Mofokeng (born 1982), South African footballer
- George Mofokeng (born 1979), South African long-distance runner
- George Mofokeng (born 1979), South African footballer
- Jerry Mofokeng (born 1956), South African actor
- Lethola Mofokeng (born 1984), South African footballer
- Mandla Mofokeng (born 1967), South African musician
- Relebohile Mofokeng (born 2004), South African football player
- Ryder Mofokeng (born 1950), South African footballer and football manager
- Sammy Mofokeng (born 1991), South African cricketer
- Santu Mofokeng (1956–2020), South African photographer
- Tlaleng Mofokeng, South African physician
