= Ngwenya (surname) =

Ngwenya is an Nguni surname meaning "crocodile". Notable people with the surname include:

- Ntsika Ngwenya (born 1999), Eswatini Founder of SpeedApp
- Dumisani Ngwenya (born 1984), South African footballer
- Godfrey Ngwenya (born 1950), South African military commander
- Gwen Ngwenya (born 1989), South African academic and politician
- Joseph Ngwenya (born 1981), Zimbabwean footballer
- Kieran Ngwenya (born 2002), Trinidadian footballer
- Lindiwe Ngwenya, Zimbabwean army officer
- Malangatana Ngwenya (1936–2011), Mozambican painter and poet
- Manqoba Ngwenya (born 1981), South African footballer
- Sipho Ngwenya, South African politician
- Takudzwa Ngwenya (born 1985), American rugby union player
- Respect Ngwenya (born 1985), Zimbabwean Teacher
