= Chiwunga =

Chiwunga is a surname. Notable people with the surname include:

- Lot Chiwunga, Zimbabwean footballer
- Temptation Chiwunga, Zimbabwean footballer
