= Mambare =

Mambare may refer to:

- Mambare River, a river in Oro Province, Papua New Guinea
- Masimba Mambare, a Zimbabwean footballer
