= Mochudi Stadium =

Coordinates: 24°23′26″S 26°09′27″E

Mochudi Stadium is a multi-use stadium in Gaborone, Botswana, with a capacity of 10,000 people. It is used mostly for football matches and serves as the home stadium of Centre Chiefs.
