= Kareng (disambiguation) =

Kareng is a village in North-West District of Botswana.

Kareng may also refer to:

- Kareng language, an Mbum language of the Central African Republic
- Noah Kareng (21st century), Botswana footballer

== See also ==
- Karang
