= Sekhana Koko =

Motswana footballer

Personal information
- Full name: Sekhana Koko
- Date of birth: 23 July 1983 (age 43)
- Place of birth: Molepolole
- Height: 1.70 m (5 ft 7 in)
- Position: Winger

Team information
- Current team: Mochudi Centre Chiefs
- Number: 7

Senior career*
Years	Team	Apps	(Gls)
2001-2003	Stonebreakers		
2003-2006	Uniao Flamengo Santos		
2006-2008	Township Rollers		
2008-2010	Mochudi Centre Chiefs		
2010-2016	Township Rollers		
2016-2018	Jwaneng Galaxy		
2018-	Mochudi Centre Chiefs		

International career^{‡}
2014-	Botswana	10	(0)
- * Club domestic league appearances and goals as of 29 August 2009 ‡ National team caps and goals as of 4 October 2019

Sekhana Koko (born 23 July 1983) is a Motswana footballer playing for Mochudi Centre Chiefs in the Botswana First Division South and the Botswana national football team.

== Honours ==
=== Club ===
Jwaneng Galaxy

- Mascom Top 8 Cup: 2016–17

Township Rollers

- Botswana Premier League: 2010–11, 2013–14, 2015–16
- Mascom Top 8 Cup: 2011–12
