= Malepa Bolelang =

Motswana footballer

Personal information
- Full name: Malepa Bolelang
- Date of birth: 25 February 1982 (age 44)
- Place of birth: Botswana
- Height: 1.68 m (5 ft 6 in)
- Position: Forward

Senior career*
Years	Team	Apps	(Gls)
2003–2012	ECCO City Green		(42+)
2012–2015	Motlakase Power Dynamos		
2015–2017	ECCO City Green		

International career^{‡}
2004–2010	Botswana	25	(2)
- * Club domestic league appearances and goals ‡ National team caps and goals as of 10:25, 21 December 2009 (UTC)

Malepa Bolelang (born 25 February 1982) is a Motswana retired footballer. He won 25 caps and scored 2 goals for the Botswana national football team.
