= Mpho Mabogo =

Motswana footballer

Personal information
- Full name: Mpho Mabogo
- Date of birth: 28 July 1980 (age 46)
- Place of birth: Botswana
- Height: 1.89 m (6 ft 2 1/2 in)
- Position: Striker

Team information
- Current team: Centre Chiefs

Senior career*
Years	Team	Apps	(Gls)
2000–2007	Botswana Defence Force XI		
2007–	Centre Chiefs		

International career^{‡}
2001–	Botswana	8	(0)
- * Club domestic league appearances and goals as of 29 August 2009 ‡ National team caps and goals as of 29 August 2009

Mpho Mabogo (born 28 July 1980) is a Motswana former footballer.
