= James Tshekedi =

Motswana footballer

Personal information
- Full name: James Tshekedi
- Place of birth: Botswana
- Position: Defender

Senior career*
Years	Team	Apps	(Gls)
2003–2004	Centre Chiefs		

International career
2003	Botswana	1	(0)
- * Club domestic league appearances and goals

James Tshekedi is a Motswana former footballer who played as a defender. He played one game for the Botswana national football team in 2003.
