= Gobonyeone Selefa =

Motswana footballer

Personal information
- Full name: Gobonyeone Selefa
- Place of birth: Botswana
- Height: 1.80 m (5 ft 11 in)
- Position: Centre back

Team information
- Current team: Mochudi Centre Chiefs

Senior career*
Years	Team	Apps	(Gls)
2005–2007	Notwane		
2007–	Mochudi Centre Chiefs		

International career^{‡}
2008–2010	Botswana	3	(0)
- * Club domestic league appearances and goals ‡ National team caps and goals as of 11:02, 24 May 2017 (UTC)

Gobonyeone Selefa is a Motswana footballer who played as a defender. He has won two caps for the Botswana national team.
