= Molathegi Podile =

Motswana footballer

Personal information
- Full name: Molathegi Podile
- Place of birth: Botswana
- Position: Striker

Senior career*
Years	Team	Apps	(Gls)
1999–2005	Centre Chiefs		

International career
1999	Botswana	1	(0)
- * Club domestic league appearances and goals

Molathegi Podile is a Motswana former footballer who played as a striker. He played one game for the Botswana national football team in 1999.
