= Manqoba Ngwenya =

South African soccer player

Personal information
- Full name: Manqoba Ngwenya
- Date of birth: 23 March 1981 (age 45)
- Place of birth: Soweto, South Africa
- Height: 1.85 m (6 ft 1 in)
- Positions: Left winger; striker; attacking midfielder

Team information
- Current team: Township Rollers
- Number: 20

Senior career*
Years	Team	Apps	(Gls)
2000–2003	Wits University	31	(10)
2003–2010	Mamelodi Sundowns	55	(8)
2009	→ Hải Phòng Cement (loan)		
2011	Mpumalanga Black Aces	10	(1)
2011–2012	Thanda Royal Zulu		
2012–2013	Alexandra United	0	(0)
2013	Notwane		
2013–2015	Township Rollers		(12+)

International career
2003–2009	South Africa	3	(0)
- * Club domestic league appearances and goals

Manqoba "Shakes" Ngwenya (born 23 March 1981 in Soweto, Gauteng) is a South African former football (soccer) midfielder.

== Career statistics ==
=== Club ===
Only league statistics are known.

Appearances and goals by club, season and competition
Club	Season	League		
Club	Season	Division	Apps	Goals
Wits University	2000–01	National First Division	4	2
Wits University	2001–02	National First Division	5	1
Wits University	2002–03	National First Division	22	7
Wits University	Total		31	10
Mamelodi Sundowns	2003–04	South African Premiership	12	2
Mamelodi Sundowns	2004–05	South African Premiership	9	1
Mamelodi Sundowns	2005–06	South African Premiership	12	5
Mamelodi Sundowns	2006–07	South African Premiership	7	0
Mamelodi Sundowns	2007–08	South African Premiership	13	0
Mamelodi Sundowns	2008–09	South African Premiership	2	0
Mamelodi Sundowns	2009–10	South African Premiership	0	0
Hải Phòng Cement (loan)	2009	V.League 1	?	?
Hải Phòng Cement (loan)	Total		55	8
Mpumalanga Black Aces	2011–12	National First Division	10	1
Alexandra United	2012–13	SAFA Second Division	?	?
Alexandra United	Total		10+	1+
Notwane	2013–14	Botswana Premier League	?	?
Township Rollers	2013–14	Botswana Premier League	?	?
Township Rollers	2014–15	Botswana Premier League	?	12
Township Rollers	Total		?	12+
Career total			96+	31+

=== International ===
Appearances and goals by national team and year
National team	Year	Apps	Goals
South Africa	2003	1	0
South Africa	2004	0	0
South Africa	2005	0	0
South Africa	2006	0	0
South Africa	2007	0	0
South Africa	2008	0	0
South Africa	2009	2	0
Total		3	0

== Honours ==
Mamelodi Sundowns

- South African Premiership: 2005–06, 2006–07, runner-up 2009–10
- Carling Knockout Cup: runner-up 2007
- MTN 8: 2007

Township Rollers

- Botswana Premier League: 2013–14
- Mascom Top 8 Cup: runner-up 2013–14, 2014–15
