= Mike Sithole =

Zambian football manager (born 1950)

Personal information
- Place of birth: Zambia

Managerial career
- Years: Team
- Mochudi Centre Chiefs SC
- Gaborone United SC
- Township Rollers FC
- Mochudi Centre Chiefs SC
- Jwaneng Galaxy FC
- Botswana Police XI SC

Mike Sithole is a Zambian football manager who last managed Botswana Police XI SC.

== Life and career ==
Sithole was born in Zambia. He was appointed manager of Botswana side Mochudi Centre Chiefs SC. He helped the club win their first league title. After that, he was appointed manager of Botswana side Gaborone United SC. He helped the club win the league. After that, he was appointed manager of Botswana side Township Rollers FC. He helped the club win the Mascom Top 8 Cup. After that, he returned as manager of Botswana side Mochudi Centre Chiefs SC. He helped the club win the league.

After that, he was appointed manager of Botswana side Jwaneng Galaxy FC. He helped the club win their first Mascom Top 8 Cup. After that, he was appointed manager of Botswana side Botswana Police XI SC. He helped the club achieve fourth place in the league. He has been regarded to have had a significant impact on Botswana football. He became the first foreign manager to win trophies with four different Botswana sides. He has been described as "stands tall as the coach who transforms league laggards into league leaders and recently promoted sides into marauding cup winners".
