= Freedom Puriza =

Namibian footballer

Personal information
- Date of birth: 22 June 1980 (age 46)
- Place of birth: Windhoek
- Height: 1.70 m (5 ft 7 in)
- Position: Defender

Senior career*
Years	Team	Apps	(Gls)
- Hotflames
2003–2007	African Stars		
2007–2008	FC AK		
2008–2011	Eleven Arrows		
2011–2014	African Stars		
2014–2015	Golden Arrows	1	(0)
2015–2018	African Stars		

International career
2006–2014	Namibia	16	(0)
- * Club domestic league appearances and goals

Freedom Puriza (born 22 June 1980) is a retired Namibian football defender. He was capped several times for Namibia, including the 2008 and 2013 COSAFA Cups.
