= Jackie Mothatego =

Personal information
- Date of birth: February 18, 1987 (age 39)
- Place of birth: Selebi-Phikwe, Botswana
- Position: Forward

Team information
- Current team: Mochudi Centre Chiefs SC
- Number: 4

Senior career*
Years	Team	Apps	(Gls)
- Notwane F.C.
?–2015	Gaborone United	10	(1)
2015–	Mochudi Centre Chiefs SC	15	(3)

International career
2012–2013	Botswana	4	(1)
- * Club domestic league appearances and goals

Jackie Mothatego is a Motswana footballer who plays for Mochudi Centre Chiefs SC.

== Career ==
In 2014, the forward was given a trial for Bloemfontein Celtic. Bloemfontein Celtic F.C. confirmed that the international would not join them after evaluating him on trial over the course of January 2014. Their reason was that their foreign players limit was reached.

Failing to seal a frequent spot at Mochudi Centre Chiefs SC, he resorted to Gilport Lions recently.

== International career ==
He was selected for the Botswana national football team in 2012–2013. In a match against Malawi, Bothatego scored the only goal.
