= 2013–14 Mascom Top 8 Cup =

Football tournament season in Botswana

Tournament details
- Country: Botswana
- Dates: 2 November 2013 – 1 March 2014
- Teams: 8

Final positions
- Champions: BDF XI (1st title)
- Runners-up: Township Rollers

Tournament statistics
- Matches played: 13
- Goals scored: 41 (3.15 per match)
- Top goal scorer: Jerome Louis (4 goals)

Awards
- Best player: Kabelo Seakanyeng

The 2013–14 Mascom Top 8 Cup, also known as Mascom Top 8 Cup Season 3 for sponsorship reasons, was the third edition of the Mascom Top 8 Cup. It was played from November 2, 2013 to March 1, 2014 and featured the top eight teams from the 2012-13 Botswana Premier League. BDF XI defeated Township Rollers in the final to win their first title.

== History ==
The 2013 tournament was played from November to March instead of February to May like the previous tournament. It was also the first tournament to span two calendar years. It was the only tournament to take place in Botswana for the season, since the 2014 FA Challenge Cup was not played, therefore the winner represented the country in the CAF Confederation Cup. There were no debutants in this edition of the Mascom Top 8 Cup.

== Prize money ==
The prize money was kept the same from the 2013 competition.

- Champions: P1 000 000
- Runners up: P400 000
- Semifinalists: P200 000
- Quarterfinalists: P125 000

== Format ==
The quarterfinals and semifinals were played over two legs both home and away, with only one final in a predetermined venue. Three points were awarded for a win, one point for a draw and none for a loss. Aggregate score was used to determine the winner of a round. Where the aggregate score was equal away goals were used to pick out the victor and if those were equal the tied teams went into a penalty shootout. There was no quarterfinal draw. The teams were seeded based on their position in the table, with the first placed team facing off against the eighth placed team.

== Quarterfinals ==
First legs
Date	Home	Score	Away
November 2	ECCO City Greens	0-3	Gaborone United
November 3	Nico United	1-0	Extension Gunners
November 4	Mochudi Centre Chiefs	2-3	Township Rollers
November 5	BDF XI	1-1	BMC

Second legs
Date	Home	Score	Away
November 29	Township Rollers	1-2	Mochudi Centre Chiefs
November 30	Extension Gunners	2-1	Nico United
December 1	Gaborone United	3-2	ECCO City Greens
December 2	BMC	2-2	BDF XI

== Semifinals ==
First legs
Date	Home	Score	Away
January 25	Gaborone United	1-2	Township Rollers
January 25	BDF XI	5-2	Nico United

Second legs
Date	Home	Score	Away
February 8	Nico United	1-0	BDF XI
February 19	Township Rollers	1-1	Gaborone United

== Final ==
Final
Date	Winner	Score	Runners up
March 1	BDF XI	1-1 (5-4)	Township Rollers

== Awards ==
- Top goalscorer | (Namibia) Jerome Louis (4 goals) | Township Rollers
- Player of the tournament | (Botswana) Kabelo Seakanyeng | BDF XI
- Goalkeeper of the tournament | (Botswana) Mwampule Masule | Township Rollers
- Coach of the tournament | (Zimbabwe) Madinda Ndlovu | Township Rollers
- Referee of the tournament | (Botswana) Keabetswe Dintwa
- Assistant referee of the tournament | (Botswana) Moletlanyi Keoagile
- Best electronic journalist (radio) | (Botswana) Monnakgotla Mojaki | Gabz FM
- Best electronic journalist (TV) | (Botswana) Aaron Radira | BTV
- Best radio commentator | (Botswana) Fundi Gaoforwe | RB2
- Best TV commentator | (Botswana) Nelson Ditibane | BTV
- Best print journalist | Isaac Pheko | Botswana Guardian
- Best photographer | (Botswana) Oaitse Sejakgomo | Sunday Standard
