= Lindiwe Ngwenya =

- Military career
- Allegiance: Zimbabwe
- Branch: Zimbabwe National Army
- Rank: Brigadier-General

Brigadier-General Lindiwe Ngwenya is an officer of the Zimbabwe National Army.

Lindiwe Ngwenya was promoted to the rank of brigadier-general on 18 December 2015. She became the second general officer in the Zimbabwe National Army (after Shylet Moyo).
