= Thato Siska =

Motswana footballer

Personal information
- Full name: Thato Siska
- Place of birth: Botswana
- Position: Striker

Senior career*
Years	Team	Apps	(Gls)
2003–2006	Notwane FC		
2006–2007	Uniao Flamengo Santos		
2007–2008	Centre Chiefs		

International career
2003–2007	Botswana	2	(0)
- * Club domestic league appearances and goals

Thato Siska is a Motswana former footballer who played as a striker. He played for the Botswana national football team between 2003 and 2007.
