= Oscar Ncenga =

Football player from Botswana

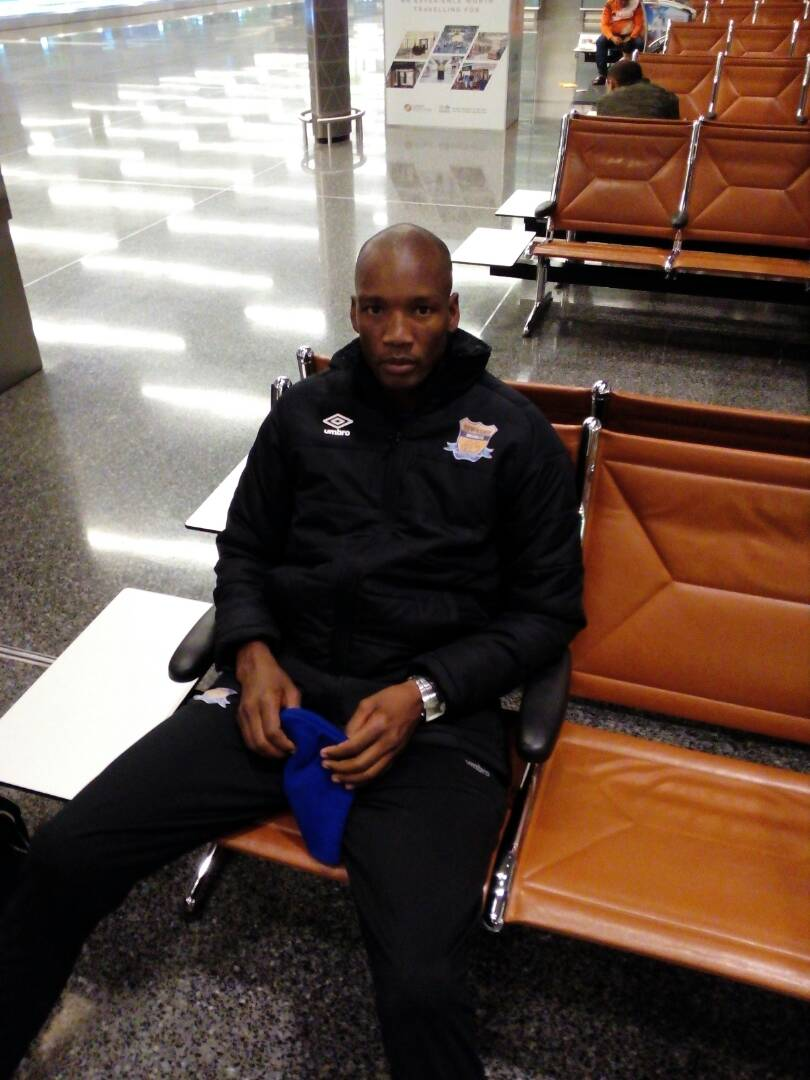

Personal information
- Full name: Oscar Obuile Ncenga
- Date of birth: 27 February 1984 (age 42)
- Place of birth: Mosetse
- Height: 1.92 m (6 ft 3 1/2 in)
- Position: Centreback

Senior career*
Years	Team	Apps	(Gls)
2005–2008	Sua Flamingos		
2008-2019	Township Rollers		

International career^{‡}
2012-	Botswana	29	(0)
- * Club domestic league appearances and goals as of 29 August 2009 ‡ National team caps and goals as of 4 October 2019

Oscar Obuile Ncenga (born 27 February 1984) is a Motswana footballer playing for the Botswana national football team.

== Honours ==
=== Club ===
Township Rollers

- Botswana Premier League:7

2009-10, 2010-11, 2013-14, 2015-16, 2016-17, 2017-18, 2018-19

- FA Cup:1

2010

- Mascom Top 8 Cup:2

2011-12, 2017-18
