= Ronny Hoareau =

Seychellois footballer

Ronny Steven Hoareau (born 20 March 1983) is a Seychellois former footballer. He captained Northern Dynamo FC in the Seychelles First Division and also played for the Seychelles national football team. His position was center back.
