= Felix Chindungwe =

Zimbabwean footballer (born 1982)

Personal information
- Date of birth: 9 September 1982 (age 44)
- Place of birth: Gokwe, Zimbabwe
- Height: 1.74 m (5 ft 9 in)
- Position: Defender

Team information
- Current team: Hwange

Senior career*
Years	Team	Apps	(Gls)
2012–2013	Chicken Inn		
2014–2016	Highlanders		
2017	Tsholotsho Pirates		
2018–	Hwange		

International career^{‡}
2013–2014	Zimbabwe	12	(0)
- * Club domestic league appearances and goals as of 14 November 2020 ‡ National team caps and goals as of 14 November 2020

Felix Chindungwe (born 9 September 1982) is a Zimbabwean professional footballer who plays as a defender for Hwange F.C.

== International career ==
In January 2014, coach Ian Gorowa invited him to be a part of the Zimbabwe squad for the 2014 African Nations Championship. He helped the team to a fourth-place finish after being defeated by Nigeria by a goal to nil.
