= António Nzayinawo =

Angolan footballer (born 1994)

Abdul
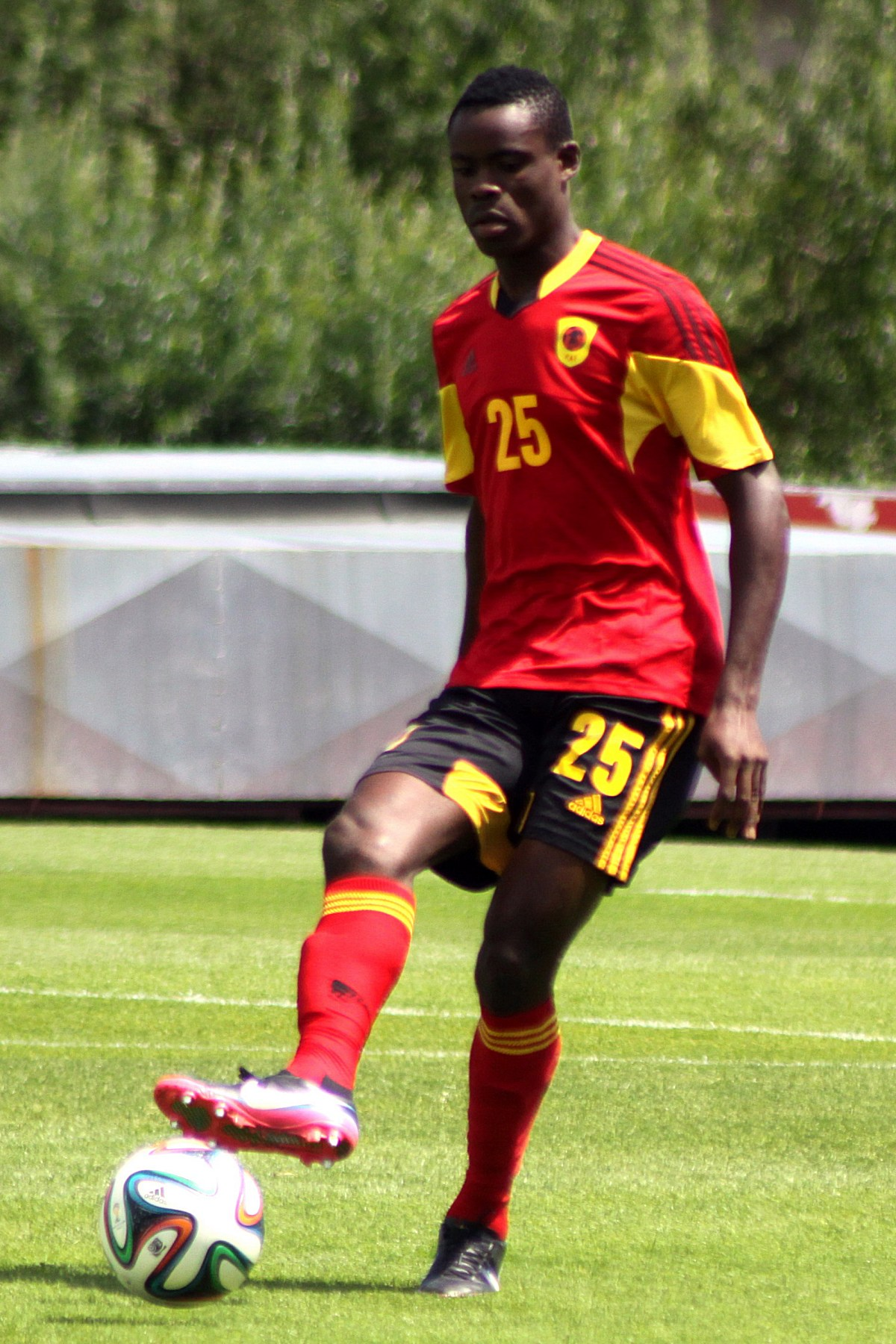
- Abdul in 2014

Personal information
- Full name: António Nzayinawo
- Date of birth: 7 April 1994 (age 32)
- Place of birth: Luanda, Angola
- Height: 1.81 m (5 ft 11 in)
- Position: Defender

Team information
- Current team: Petro de Luanda
- Number: 25

Senior career*
Years	Team	Apps	(Gls)
2012–	Petro de Luanda		

International career^{‡}
2013–	Angola	8	(2)
- * Club domestic league appearances and goals ‡ National team caps and goals as of 28 October 2013

António Nzayinawo commonly nicknamed Abdul or Abdul Nzayinawo (born 7 April 1994) is an Angolan international footballer who plays professionally for Petro de Luanda primarily as a defender. He used to play for AS Vita. He played at the 2014 FIFA World Cup qualification.

== International goals ==
Scores and results list Angola's goal tally first.

Goal	Date	Venue	Opponent	Score	Result	Competition
1.	16 July 2013	Arthur Davies Stadium, Kitwe, Zambia	Malawi	3–2	3–2	2013 COSAFA Cup
2.	7 September 2013	Estádio Nacional da Tundavala, Lubango, Angola	Liberia	4–0	4–1	2014 FIFA World Cup qualification
