= Apson Manjate =

Mozambican footballer

Personal information
- Full name: Apson David Manjate
- Date of birth: 10 August 1985 (age 41)
- Height: 1.90 m (6 ft 3 in)
- Position: Forward

Team information
- Current team: Bravos do Maquis

Senior career*
Years	Team	Apps	(Gls)
2007–2010	Desportivo Maputo		
2011	Ferroviário Maputo		
2012–2014	Liga Muçulmana		
2014–	Bravos do Maquis		

International career
2008–2017	Mozambique	34	(7)
- * Club domestic league appearances and goals

Apson Manjate, also known as Sonito, is a Mozambican international football player. He plays as a forward for Angolan club Bravos do Maquis, having previously played for Liga Muçulmana, Ferroviário Maputo and Grupo Desportivo Maputo.

He was named in the Mozambique national team for the 2013 COSAFA Cup. He scored in games against Zambia and Namibia.

== Career statistics ==
=== International ===
Appearances and goals by national team and year
National team	Year	Apps	Goals
Mozambique	2008	4	0
Mozambique	2009	–	
Mozambique	2010	–	
Mozambique	2011	2	0
Mozambique	2012	1	0
Mozambique	2013	8	3
Mozambique	2014	9	2
Mozambique	2015	1	0
Mozambique	2016	7	2
Mozambique	2017	2	0
Total		34	7

Scores and results list Mozambique's goal tally first, score column indicates score after each Manjate goal.

List of international goals scored by Apson Manjate
No.	Date	Venue	Cap	Opponent	Score	Result	Competition
1	14 July 2013	Nkana Stadium, Kitwe, Zambia	9	Zambia	1–3	1–3	2013 COSAFA Cup
2	16 July 2013	Arthur Davies Stadium, Kitwe, Zambia	10	Namibia	1–0	1–0	2013 COSAFA Cup
3	18 July 2013	Nkana Stadium, Kitwe, Zambia	11	Angola	1–0	1–0	2013 COSAFA Cup
4	18 May 2014	Estádio do Zimpeto, Maputo, Mozambique	17	South Sudan	3–0	5–0	2015 Africa Cup of Nations qualification
5	18 May 2014	Estádio do Zimpeto, Maputo, Mozambique	17	South Sudan	4–0	5–0	2015 Africa Cup of Nations qualification
6	24 March 2016	Accra Sports Stadium, Accra, Ghana	26	Ghana	1–3	1–3	2017 Africa Cup of Nations qualification
7	4 June 2016	Amahoro Stadium, Kigali, Rwanda	28	Rwanda	2–1	3–2	2017 Africa Cup of Nations qualification
