= Matibidi =

- Location within Mpumalanga Location within South Africa
- Coordinates: 24.628°S 30.759°E
- Country: South Africa
- Province: Mpumalanga
- District: Ehlanzeni
- Municipality: Thaba Chweu

Area
  - Total: 9.11 km^{2} (3.52 sq mi)

Population (2011)
  - Total: 6,476
  - Density: 711/km^{2} (1,840/sq mi)

Racial makeup (2011)
  - Black African: 99.6%
  - Coloured: 0.1%
  - Indian/Asian: 0.1%
  - White: 0.1%
  - Other: 0.1%

First languages (2011)
  - Northern Sotho: 96.1%
  - Other: 3.9%
- Time zone: UTC+2 (SAST)
- PO box: 1274
- Area code: 013

Matibidi is a village in Thaba Chweu Local Municipality of Mpumalanga province, South Africa.
