= Kabaso Chongo =

Zambian footballer (born 1992)

Personal information
- Full name: Kabaso Chongo
- Date of birth: 11 February 1992 (age 34)
- Place of birth: Mufulira, Zambia
- Height: 1.79 m (5 ft 10 in)
- Position: Defender

Team information
- Current team: TP Mazembe
- Number: 14

Senior career*
Years	Team	Apps	(Gls)
2012–2013	Konkola Mine Police		
2014–	TP Mazembe	248	(8)

International career^{‡}
2013–	Zambia	43	(1)
- * Club domestic league appearances and goals as of 01:20, 17 January 2023 (UTC) ‡ National team caps and goals as of 14 July 2021

Kabaso Chongo (born 11 February 1992) is a Zambian professional footballer who plays as a defender for Linafoot club TP Mazembe.

== International career ==
On 10 December 2025, Chongo was called up to the Zambia squad for the 2025 Africa Cup of Nations.

=== International goals ===
Scores and results list Zambia's goal tally first.

No.	Date	Venue	Opponent	Score	Result	Competition
1.	20 July 2013	Levy Mwanawasa Stadium, Ndola, Zambia	Zimbabwe	2–0	2–0	2013 COSAFA Cup

== Honours ==
TP Mazembe

Winner

- Linafoot: 2013–14
