= Ralekoti Mokhahlane =

Mosotho footballer (born 1986)

Personal information
- Full name: Ralekoti Mokhahlane
- Date of birth: 3 June 1986 (age 40)
- Place of birth: Marabeng, Berea, Lesotho
- Height: 1.70 m (5 ft 7 in)
- Position: Midfielder

Senior career*
Years	Team	Apps	(Gls)
2005–2007	Likhopo Maseru	50	(24)
2007–2008	LCS	20	(12)
2008–2010	Sfax Railways Sports	59	(29)
2010–2011	Jendouba Sport	28	(22)
2011–2012	Stade Tunisien	11	(3)
2012	ES Beni-Khalled (loan)	18	(4)
2012–2014	FC Balzers	28	(12)

International career^{‡}
2006–2019	Lesotho	35	(4)
- * Club domestic league appearances and goals ‡ National team caps and goals as of 4 April 2017

Ralekoti Mokhahlane (born 3 June 1986) is a retired Mosotho footballer who played as a midfielder. He has won six caps for the Lesotho national football team since 2006.

== International career ==
=== International goals ===
Scores and results list Lesotho's goal tally first.

No	Date	Venue	Opponent	Score	Result	Competition
1.	8 July 2013	Arthur Davies Stadium, Kitwe, Zambia	Kenya	1–0	2–2	2013 COSAFA Cup
2.	9 July 2013	Arthur Davies Stadium, Kitwe, Zambia	Botswana	1–2	3–3	2013 CECAFA Cup
3.	6 September 2015	Setsoto Stadium, Maseru, Lesotho	Algeria	1–1	1–3	2017 Africa Cup of Nations qualification
4.	25 October 2015	Setsoto Stadium, Maseru, Lesotho	Zimbabwe	1–1	1–1	2016 African Nations Championship qualification
