= Black Mambas F.C. =

Zimbabwean football club

Black Mambas FC
- Full name: Black Mambas Football Club
- Nickname: The Mambas
- Ground: Morris Depot; Harare, Zimbabwe
- Capacity: 5,000
- Chairman: Joseph Madzimuirema
- Manager: Teddy Zhou
- Coach: John Ncube
- League: Zimbabwe Premier Soccer League (ZPSL)
- 2011: 11th
Home colours	Away colours

Black Mambas FC is a Zimbabwean football club based in Harare, Zimbabwe.

The team colours are black and gold at home and gold and black away.

== Current squad ==
Note: Flags indicate national team as defined under FIFA eligibility rules; some limited exceptions apply. Players may hold more than one non-FIFA nationality.

No.	Pos.	Nation	Player
-	GK	ZIM	Willard Manyatera
-	DF	ZIM	Lovemore Maphuya
-	DF	ZIM	William Mapfumo
-	DF	ZIM	Ben Nyahunzvi
-	MF	ZIM	Abbas Hussein
-	MF	ZIM	Isaac Madziva
-	MF	ZIM	Bruce Tshuma
-	FW	ZIM	Sebastian Mutizirwa
-		ZIM	Audience Rudofa
-		ZIM	Casper Machona
-		ZIM	G Chikwevu
-		ZIM	G Masika
-		ZIM	I Nyoni

No.	Pos.	Nation	Player
-		ZIM	Kasimero Chimbadzwa
-		ZIM	L Kaisa
-		ZIM	Shingirai Mandizwidza
-		ZIM	Leonard Mavezere
-		ZIM	M Katsvairo
-		ZIM	O Muvhimi
-		ZIM	P Kachirika
-		ZIM	Richard Mteki
-		ZIM	Rey Oweneel
-		ZIM	Tendai Kachembere
-		ZIM	Winston Chehore
-		ZIM	Nqobile Mpala

== Staff ==
Chairman

- (Zimbabwe) Mekia Tanyanyiwa

"Secretary" Anthony Mangezi "Vice Secretary" Andrew Phiri "Treasurer" Maaserwe

Head Coach

- (Zimbabwe) John Ncube

Assistant Coach

- (Zimbabwe) Martin Bonongwe

Goalkeeper's Coach

- (Zimbabwe) Winston Chihore

Team Manager

- (Zimbabwe) Teddy Zhou

Technical Advisor

- (Zimbabwe) Madinda Ndlovu

Chief Scout

- (Zimbabwe) Lance Millar
