= Shylet Moyo =

- Military career
- Allegiance: Zimbabwe
- Branch: Zimbabwe National Army
- Rank: Brigadier-General

Brigadier-General Shylet Moyo is an officer of the Zimbabwe National Army.

Shylet Moyo was promoted to the rank of brigadier-general in 2013. Moyo became the first woman to be promoted to the rank of general officer or air officer in the Zimbabwe Defence Forces (Ellen Chiweshe became the first female air commodore in January 2016). Moyo's brigadier-general rank was conferred in a ceremony presided over by Lieutenant-General Philip Valerio Sibanda, commander of the Zimbabwe National Army.
