= Gastin Simukonda =

Malawian footballer

Personal information
- Date of birth: 26 February 1993 (age 33)
- Place of birth: Mzuzu, Malawi
- Height: 1.76 m (5 ft 9 in)
- Position: Forward

Team information
- Current team: Moyale Barracks

Senior career*
Years	Team	Apps	(Gls)
2009–2014	Moyale Barracks		
2014–2015	CD Costa do Sol		
2016–	Moyale Barracks		

International career^{‡}
2010–2019	Malawi	23	(1)
- * Club domestic league appearances and goals as of 1 August 2021 ‡ National team caps and goals as of 1 August 2021

Gastin Simukonda (born 26 February 1993) is a Malawian football striker who currently plays for Moyale Barracks.
