= Mandla Masango =

South African Football player (born 1989)

Personal information
- Full name: Mandla Grateful Masango
- Date of birth: 18 July 1989 (age 37)
- Place of birth: Kwaggafontein, South Africa
- Height: 5 ft 6 in (1.68 m)
- Position: Right winger

Youth career
- Mega Force
- HP Silver Stars
- Walter Stars

Senior career*
Years	Team	Apps	(Gls)
2007–2015	Kaizer Chiefs	105	(11)
2015–2018	Randers FC	29	(7)
2017	→ SuperSport United (loan)	13	(3)

International career^{‡}
2006	South Africa U-17	3	(2)
2009	South Africa U-20	4	(1)
2011	South Africa U-23	3	(3)
2013–	South Africa	13	(4)
- * Club domestic league appearances and goals as of 18 June 2016 ‡ National team caps and goals as of 5 July 2015

Mandla Greatful Masango (born July 18, 1989) is a South African soccer player who most recently played as a right winger for Randers in Denmark. Masango represented South Africa at various youth levels and has been a full international since making his senior debut in 2013.

== Club career ==
=== Kaizer Chiefs ===
Masango joined Kaizer Chiefs in 2007 ahead of the 2007–08 Premier Soccer League season. He made his debut against Thanda Royal Zulu on 15 August 2007, scoring the Chiefs' first goal in a 2–0 win. He has gradually become a regular in the club's first team, making ten league appearances in 2009–10, before playing 20 league games in 2010–11. He has played twice so far in the 2011–12 season. Masango also scored for Kaiser Chiefs in their 2–0 win over Mpumalanga Black Aces on 24 February 2010, again opening the scoring. In the 2012–13 season where Chiefs won a league and cup double, Masango played only nine league games. In 2013–14, he made his CAF Champions League debut against Black Africa and scored a scissor kick from a Knowledge Musona cross in the 3–0 win. He also came off the bench in the Nedbank Cup Last 16 match and scored a diving header against ABC Motsepe League side FC Buffalo. At the end of the season, he attracted interest from Sweden Superettan club, Landskrona BoIS which already had a South African in their team with Bradley Ralani. He also received an offer from Mpumalanga Black Aces but the deal was put on ice after they found out about his high salary. He was also on the verge of being loaned to Ajax Cape Town or Moroka Swallows. Masango started off the 2014–15 season with a brace in a 4–0 win over Mpumalanga Black Aces in the MTN8. He scored his first league goal of 2014–15 in a 2–1 win over Mpumalanga Black Aces on 13 August 2013. He also scored a solitary goal against Bloemfontein Celtic in the 81st minute on 19 August 2014. On 11 September 2014, Masango and Stuart Baxter were named ABSA Premiership Player and Coach of the Month. After being rested against University of Pretoria, he played in the 1–0 win over Orlando Pirates in the MTN8 2014 Final. Masango scored a solitary penalty goal in the 45th minute against Maritzburg United on 27 September 2014. Masango eventually attracted the interest of Ligue 1 club Rennes which hoped to sign him in January or the end of 2014–15 shouldn't his contract be extended. The club planned to send a representative for the then upcoming Soweto derby but was postponed as it was on the day of the funeral of the late South African national team captain Senzo Meyiwa. The club later revealed that Rennes would send a scout to watch him at the 2015 African Cup of Nations. On his last Chiefs match, Masango scored a header on 9 May 2015 in a 2–0 win over Chippa United. Masango attracted the likes of Rennes, Anorthorsis Famagusta and Hapoel Tel Aviv.

=== Randers ===
On 13 August 2015 it was announced that Masango had reach an agreement with Randers on a free transfer. On 30 August 2015, Masango made his debut in a 2–0 win over AaB where he scored the second goal in the 82nd minute.

== Style of play ==
Masango is of lean and diminutive build. Muhsin Ertugral who signed Masango in 2007 compared him to maverick genius Jabu Pule who he said had ability to read and change the game, and create spaces as well as bravely take on defenders. Masango plays as a right winger, secondary striker and also as an attacking midfielder. Masango was also described as Le James Noir. FifaPlayerRatings.com suggests that Masango would excel more as a forward for his "better finishing ability than most midfielders" and "above average balance" and ranks him in the top 20% of attacking players in FIFA 15 and the 270th best Right Midfielder in the game.

== Personal life ==
Masango has a diploma in General Management and is currently studying project management at Boston City Campus.

== International career ==
=== International goals ===
Scores and results list South Africa's goal tally first.

#	Date	Venue	Opponent	Score	Result	Competition
1.	20 July 2013	Levy Mwanawasa Stadium, Ndola	Lesotho	1–1	2–1	Friendly
2.	27 January 2015	Estadio de Mongomo, Mongomo	Ghana	1–0	1–2	2015 Africa Cup of Nations
3.	25 March 2015	Somhlolo National Stadium, Lobamba	Swaziland	3–1	3–1	Friendly
4.	5 July 2015	Stade Anjalay, Belle Vue Maurel	Mauritius	1–0	2–0	2016 African Nations Championship qualification

=== U-17 and U-20 ===
Masango has the unusual distinction of having scored on his debut for every national side he has represented. He made three appearances, scoring twice, for South Africa U-17 before moving on to the U-20 team, where he played four times, three of these games coming at the 2009 FIFA U-20 World Cup. Masango scored a consolation in the 6–1 defeat to Germany U-20 on 5 September 2009, in a World Cup warm-up match.

=== U-20 appearances and goals ===
#	Date	Venue	Opponent	Result	Competition	Goals
1	5 September 2009	Sportpark Husterhöhe, Pirmasens	Germany U-20	L 6–1	Friendly	1
2	27 September 2009	Alexandria Stadium, Alexandria	United Arab Emirates U-20	D 2–2	2009 FIFA U-20 World Cup	
3	30 September 2009	Alexandria Stadium, Alexandria	Hungary U-20	L 4–0	2009 FIFA U-20 World Cup	
4	6 October 2009	Ismailia Stadium, Ismailia	Ghana U-20	L 2–1	2009 FIFA U-20 World Cup	

=== U-23 ===
Masango played for the U-23 team, scoring on his debut in the 2–1 win over Zimbabwe to ensure South Africa's qualification for the All Africa Games. The midfielder also scored against Mauritius on 26 May 2011 in a 1–0 friendly win, and against Botswana in a 5–0 victory on 18 March 2011.

He made his senior debut on 17 July 2013 on the eve of his birthday against Lesotho and was unfortunate having not scored on debut like he did for the junior national teams. He scored in his second match in the 2013 COSAFA Cup 3rd and 4th place playoff on 20 July 2013 against Lesotho. South Africa won 2-1 finishing third with a bronze medal. Masango earned a call-up after his good form for AFCON qualifiers against Nigeria and Sudan. He claimed that his call up was "destiny" and that Sudan was his lucky charm. Masango's first call-up in international football came nine years ago against Sudan when he represented the South Africa Under-17 team in a 2005 Under-17 Youth Championship qualifier. The game was played at the same Al-Merrikh Stadium where South Africa played their 2015 African Nations Cup Group A opener against the Sudan. He played in the 3–0 win over Sudan and 0–0 draw over Nigeria. Masango scored a stunning goal referred to as a "stepback volley" against Ghana in the 2015 African Cup of Nations Group C final clash and made rounds in Spain and has been compared to Colombia's James Rodriguez famous volley in the 2–0 victory over Uruguay in last in the 2014 FIFA World Cup in Brazil. Bleacher Report described the goal as "ridiculous, outrageous and impossibly perfect".
