= Zambia Correctional Service =

Law Enforcement

Corrections
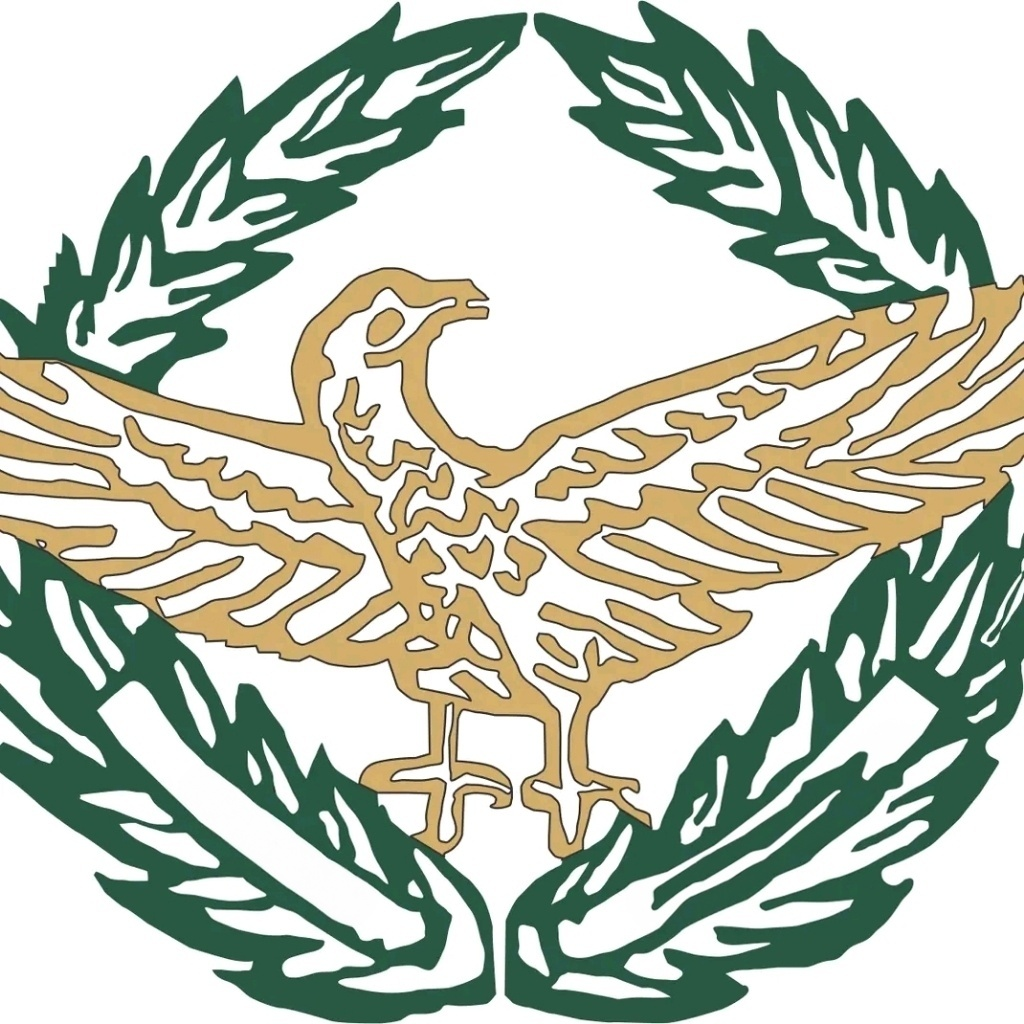
- Founded: 1964; 62 years ago
- Country: Zambia
- Type: Corrections
- Role: Custodial and Rehabilitation
- Size: 5000 Active duty personnel
- Part of: National Security services
- Headquarters: Lusaka
- Motto: To provide quality correctional services
- Colours
- Mascot: African Eagle
- Anniversaries: Prisons Day: 26 September
- Website: www.zambiacorrections.gov.zm

Commanders
- Commander-in-chief: Hakainde Hichilema
- Minister of Home Affairs: Jack Mwiimbu
- Commissioner General: CG Frederick S.S Chilukutu
- Deputy Commissioner General: DCG Bwalya kuyomba

The Zambia Correctional Service abbreviated as ZCS, formerly known as the Zambia Prisons Service, is a government agency responsible for prisons and correctional centers in Zambia as well as the rehabilitation and reintegration of offenders into society. Officially established on Independence Day, its origins trace back to the colonial era, rooted in the formation of law enforcement agencies during the British South Africa Company's governance. In 2016, the service underwent a name change to its current form. The functions of the Zambia Correctional Service are outlined in the Zambia Correctional Service Act, 2021. The service also sponsors Prison Leopards Football Club, a Kabwe-based football team competing in the Zambia Super League, reflecting its involvement in community engagement and sports development.

== History ==
The early foundations of the Northern Rhodesia Prisons Service can be traced back to the establishment of the Northern Rhodesia Police Force in 1899, which led to the creation of law enforcement entities such as the Barotse Native Police and the North-Eastern Rhodesia Constabulary. Prisons became a necessity in the early 1900s, with records from October 13, 1904, revealing the need for an Order-In-Council to address inadequate prison facilities. Before the dedicated Prisons Service, the police force managed prisons, and in 1912, prison administration was reorganized under the office of the Attorney General.In 1923, the proposal for an independent Prisons Service emerged, resulting in the return of prison management to the police force in 1927. The title 'Commissioner of Prisons' was introduced in 1931, and in 1938, Mr. T.C. Fynn recommended the separation of prisons from the police force.

The independent Prisons Service was officially established in 1942, marking the birth of the Northern Rhodesia Prisons Service. The Rhodesia Prison Service (RPS) was establishment in 1954, which was a law enforcement agency responsible for the administration of the Rhodesian prison system. The RPS was established as the Southern Rhodesia Prison Department and was incorporated into the federal prison service of the Federation of Rhodesia and Nyasaland. It continued as the prison service of independent Rhodesia during the UDI period and was dissolved upon Zimbabwe's independence in 1980.

== Corrections ranks and insignia ==
Rank	Insignia
Warder/ Wardress	
Sergeant
Sub inspector
Inspector
Chief Inspector
Assistant Superintendent
Superintendent
Senior Superintendent
Assistant Commissioner
Senior Assistant Commissioner
Deputy Commissioner
Commissioner
Deputy Commissioner General
Commissioner General

Source International encyclopedia of uniform Insignia

=== Independence and expansion ===
The Northern Rhodesia Prisons Service evolved over time, with R.L. Worsely appointed as the first independent Commissioner of Prisons in 1942. The formation of the Federation of Rhodesia and Nyasaland in 1953 led to the creation of federal prisons until 1963, after which the institution reverted to its original name. Zambia gained independence on 24 October 1964, and the headquarters remained in Broken Hill (now Kabwe). O.V. Garrat served as Commissioner during this period. In modern times, the Zambia Correctional Service underwent administrative changes. In 2015, the Zambia Correctional Service (ZCS) upgraded its Command Structure to the rank of Commissioner General. The current Commissioner General is Mr. Chilukutu, who was sworn in by President Hakainde Hichilema in September 2021. The Deputy Commissioner General is Mr. Kuyomba Bwalya, who was also sworn in by the President during the same ceremony. The Constitution Amendment Act no. 2 of 2016 prompted the change in name from Zambia Prisons Service to Zambia Correctional Service, signifying a shift from punishment to rehabilitation. The head office of the Service briefly relocated to Lusaka in 2016 before returning to Kabwe in January 2019, following a government directive. The Zambia Correctional Service is governed by Chapter 97 of the Laws of Zambia, which was under review in 2016 following the Service's name change. The Service is mandated to manage all prisons and correctional centers across the country, and its mission is to provide humane custody and quality correctional services to promote public safety and contribute to the socioeconomic development of the country. The Service has 87 correctional facilities across the country, including conventional correctional facilities, Maximum Security Prisons, and Open Air correctional facilities. The Prisons Act CAP 134 of the Laws of Zambia has been repealed by the Correctional Service Bill, which was enacted by the Parliament of Zambia in May 2021.

The Zambia Correctional Service is governed by chapter 97 of the laws of Zambia (Prisons Act), which was under review in 2016 following the Service’s name change from Zambia Prisons Service to Zambia Correctional Service on 5 January 2016. According to article 193 of the Republican Constitution, the Service is mandated to manage all prisons and correctional centres across the country. The Service is headed by the Commissioner General and is subdivided into two divisions, each headed by a Deputy Commissioner General. The Service has 87 correctional facilities across the country and its mission is to provide humane custody and quality correctional services in order to promote public safety and to contribute to the social economic development of the country.

== Mission and functions ==
The Zambia Correctional Service, falling under the Ministry of Home Affairs, is mandated to manage all prisons and correctional centers nationwide. Its mission is to provide humane custody and quality correctional services, promoting public safety and contributing to the country's socioeconomic development. The service is actively involved in providing education to adult inmates, offering primary, secondary, and tertiary education.

The functions of the Zambia Correctional Service are outlined in the Zambia Correctional Service Act, 2021. These include the establishment, management, and control of prisons and correctional centers, the correction and reformation of inmates, and the establishment of the National Parole Board, among others. The institution plays a vital role in shaping the justice system and contributing to the overall well-being of society.
