= Brian Chewe =

Zambian footballer (born 1993)

Personal information
- Date of birth: 28 June 1993 (age 33)
- Place of birth: Chililabombwe, Zambia
- Position: Forward

Team information
- Current team: Konkola Blades F.C.

Senior career*
| Years | Team | Apps | (Gls) |
| 2013– | Konkola Blades F.C. | | |

International career
| 2013 | Zambia | 1 | (0) |
- * Club domestic league appearances and goals

Brian Chewe (born 28 June 1993) is a Zambian football striker who currently plays for Konkola Blades F.C.
