= Noah Maposa =

Motswana footballer

Personal information
- Full name: Noah Maposa
- Date of birth: 3 June 1985 (age 41)
- Place of birth: Kopong, Botswana
- Height: 1.89 m (6 ft 2 1/2 in)
- Position: Goalkeeper

Team information
- Current team: Township Rollers
- Number: 26

Youth career
- Mochudi Centre Chiefs

Senior career*
Years	Team	Apps	(Gls)
2005–2011	Mochudi Centre Chiefs		
2009–2010	→ Bay United (loan)	1	(0)
2011–2012	Gaborone United		
2012–16	AS Gabès		
2016–	Township Rollers		

International career
2007	Botswana U-23	2	(0)
2008–	Botswana	9	(0)
- * Club domestic league appearances and goals

Noah Maposa (born 3 June 1985) is a Motswana footballer who currently plays for Township Rollers.

== Career ==
He played one game for Bay United in the National First Division.

On 29 January 2015, Noah joined Township Rollers.
