= Thabo Masualle =

Mosotho footballer (born 1982)

Personal information
- Full name: Thabo Masualle
- Date of birth: 18 April 1982 (age 44)
- Place of birth: Lesotho
- Position: Right back

Team information
- Current team: Lioli Teyateyaneng

Senior career*
Years	Team	Apps	(Gls)
2006–	Liyoli Teyateyaneng		

International career^{‡}
2006–	Lesotho	42	(2)
- * Club domestic league appearances and goals ‡ National team caps and goals as of 08:21, 18 April 2017 (UTC)

Thabo Masualle (born 18 April 1982) is a Mosotho footballer who currently plays as a defender for Lioli Teyateyaneng. He has won 15 caps and scored two goals for the Lesotho national football team since 2006.

== International career ==
=== International goals ===
Scores and results list Lesotho's goal tally first.

No	Date	Venue	Opponent	Score	Result	Competition
1.	10 February 2008	Somhlolo National Stadium, Lobamba, Swaziland	Swaziland	2–2	2–2	Friendly
2.	12 August 2009	Barbourfields Stadium, Bulawayo, Zimbabwe	Zimbabwe	1–0	1–1	Friendly
