= Moses Phiri =

Zambian footballer (born 1993)

Personal information
- Date of birth: 3 June 1993 (age 33)
- Place of birth: Lusaka, Zambia
- Height: 1.70 m (5 ft 7 in)
- Position: Forward

Team information
- Current team: Power Dynamos F.C.
- Number: 25

Senior career*
Years	Team	Apps	(Gls)
2010	National Assembly		
2011–2015	Zanaco		
2015–2017	Académico de Viseu	42	(7)
2017–2018	Sporting Covilhã	14	(0)
2018–2019	Buildcon		
2020–2022	Zanaco	12	(4)
2022–24	Simba	15	(7)
2024-	Power Dynamos F.C.	0	(0)

International career^{‡}
2012–	Zambia	28	(2)
- * Club domestic league appearances and goals as of 22 June 2025 @ 14:48(AEST) ‡ National team caps and goals as of 7 October 2021

Moses Phiri (born 3 June 1993) is a Zambian professional footballer who plays as a forward for Tanzanian Premier League club Simba.

== International career ==
=== International goals ===
Scores and results list Zambia's goal tally first.

No.	Date	Venue	Opponent	Score	Result	Competition
1.	14 July 2013	Nkana Stadium, Kitwe, Zambia	Mozambique	3–0	3–1	2013 COSAFA Cup
2.	31 January 2021	Stade de la Réunification, Douala, Cameroon	Morocco	1–3	1–3	2020 African Nations Championship

== Club career ==
He made his professional debut in the Segunda Liga for Académico de Viseu on 21 February 2016 in a game against Famalicão.

== Honours ==
=== Individual ===
- Zambia Super League Top scorer: 2020–21
