= Masauso Zimba =

Zambian footballer (born 1992)

Personal information
- Date of birth: 11 June 1992 (age 34)
- Place of birth: Luanshya, Zambia
- Position: Defender

Team information
- Current team: Forest Rangers F.C.

Senior career*
Years	Team	Apps	(Gls)
2008–2009	Roan United F.C.		
2010	Red Arrows F.C.		
2011	Konkola Mine Police F.C.		
2012	Roan United F.C.		
2013–2015	Nkana F.C.		
2015	Konkola Blades F.C.		
2016–	Forest Rangers F.C.		

International career
2013	Zambia	1	(0)
- * Club domestic league appearances and goals

Masauso Zimba (born 11 June 1992) is a Zambian football defender who currently plays for Forest Rangers F.C.
