= Alex Ngonga =

Zambian footballer (born 1992)

Personal information
- Full name: Alex Ngonga
- Date of birth: 21 August 1992 (age 34)
- Place of birth: Zambia
- Position: Forward

Team information
- Current team: Tadamon Sour
- Number: 25

Senior career*
| Years | Team | Apps | (Gls) |
| 2011–2015 | Nkana | | |
| 2013–2014 | → Nchanga Rangers (loan) | | |
| 2015–2017 | CF Mounana | | |
| 2017–2021 | Power Dynamos | | |
| 2021–2023 | Nkana | | |
| 2021–2023 | TP Mazembe | | |
| 2024– | Tadamon Sour | 8 | (0) |

International career
| 2013–2022 | Zambia | 20 | (1) |
- * Club domestic league appearances and goals

Alex Ngonga (born 21 August 1992) is a Zambian professional footballer who plays as a forward for Lebanese Premier League club Tadamon Sour and the Zambia national football team.

== International career ==
Ngonga made his senior international debut on 28 April 2013 in a 2–0 friendly victory over Zimbabwe. He scored his first senior international goal on 20 July 2013 in a 2–0 win over Zimbabwe in the 2013 COSAFA Cup Final.

== Career statistics ==
=== International ===
Appearances and goals by national team and year
| National team | Year | Apps | Goals |
|---|---|---|---|
| Zambia | 2013 | 12 | 1 |
| Zambia | 2014 | – | |
| Zambia | 2015 | 1 | 0 |
| Zambia | 2016 | – | |
| Zambia | 2017 | 5 | 0 |
| Zambia | 2018 | 1 | 0 |
| Zambia | 2019 | – | |
| Zambia | 2020 | – | |
| Zambia | 2021 | – | |
| Zambia | 2022 | 1 | 0 |
| Total | | 20 | 1 |

Scores and results list Zambia's goal tally first, score column indicates score after each Ngonga goal.

List of international goals scored by Alex Ngonga
| No. | Date | Venue | Opponent | Score | Result | Competition |
|---|---|---|---|---|---|---|
| 1 | 20 July 2013 | Levy Mwanawasa Stadium, Ndola, Zambia | Zimbabwe | 1–0 | 2–0 | 2013 COSAFA Cup |
