= Ivahn Marie-Josée =

Mauritian footballer

Personal information
- Full name: Ivahn Marie-Josée
- Date of birth: November 4, 1978 (age 47)
- Place of birth: Mauritius
- Position: Goalkeeper

Team information
- Current team: AS de Vacoas-Phoenix
- Number: 1

Senior career*
Years	Team	Apps	(Gls)
2004–2008	US Bassin Beau/Rose Hill	-	(-)
2008–	AS de Vacoas-Phoenix	-	(-)

International career
2008–	Mauritius	16	(0)
- * Club domestic league appearances and goals

Ivahn Marie-Josée (born November 4, 1978) is a Mauritian football player who currently plays for AS de Vacoas-Phoenix in the Mauritian Premier League and for the Mauritius national football team as a goalkeeper. He is featured on the Mauritian national team in the official 2010 FIFA World Cup video game.
