= Kgosietsile Mampori =

Motswana footballer

Personal information
- Full name: Kgosietsile Mampori
- Place of birth: Botswana
- Position: Striker

Senior career*
Years	Team	Apps	(Gls)
1995–2006	Centre Chiefs		
2006–	Uniao Flamengo Santos		

International career
2004	Botswana	1	(0)
- * Club domestic league appearances and goals

Kgosietsile Mampori is a Motswana footballer. He won his only cap for the Botswana national football team in 2004.
