= Moitheri Ntobo =

Mosotho footballer (born 1979)

Personal information
- Full name: Moitheri Ngwenya Ntobo
- Date of birth: 14 November 1979 (age 46)
- Place of birth: Lesotho
- Position: Centre back

Senior career*
Years	Team	Apps	(Gls)
1997–2002	Lesotho Prison Service	125	(14)
2002–2005	Union Sportive Monastir	71	(5)
2005–2008	LCS	81	(7)
2008–2009	F.C. Civics Windhoek	31	(3)
2009–2011	AS Douanes	56	(8)
2011–2012	Wadi Degla FC	35	(2)
2012–	Ittihad FC	0	(0)

International career
2007–	Lesotho	14	(0)
- * Club domestic league appearances and goals

Moitheri Ngwenya Ntobo (born 14 November 1979) is a Mosotho former professional footballer who last played for Lesotho Correctional Services.

== International career ==
He has won 14 caps for the Lesotho national football team since 2005.
