= Maxwell Nyamupanedengu =

Zimbabwean footballer (born 1984)

Personal information
- Date of birth: 26 October 1984 (age 42)
- Place of birth: Bulawayo, Zimbabwe
- Position: Goalkeeper

Team information
- Current team: Harare City
- Number: 16

Senior career*
Years	Team	Apps	(Gls)
2010	Kiglon		
2011	Dynamos		
2012–	Harare City		

International career^{‡}
2013–	Zimbabwe	3	(0)
- * Club domestic league appearances and goals ‡ National team caps and goals as of 15:52, 17 April 2018 (UTC)

Maxwell Nyamupanedengu (born 26 October 1984) is a Zimbabwean footballer who plays as a goalkeeper for Zimbabwe Premier Soccer League side Harare City and the Zimbabwe national team.

== Career ==
Nyamupanedengu has spent his entire career with Harare City. Internationally, he was first selected by a Zimbabwe team in 2009 by Zimbabwe A for the 2009 African Nations Championship. In 2013, Nyamupanedengu featured three times for the Zimbabwe national team with his first call-up coming for a friendly vs. Botswana. In July, he was selected for the 2013 COSAFA Cup and played in all three matches, which included him scoring an own-goal vs. Malawi, of his nation's campaign which ended in a final defeat to Zambia. He was also selected by Zimbabwe for the 2014 African Nations Championship but didn't play.

== Career statistics ==
As of 17 April 2018.

National team	Year	Apps	Goals
Zimbabwe	2013	3	0
Total		3	0

== Honours ==
Harare City

- Cup of Zimbabwe: 2017
