= Willem Mwedihanga =

Namibian footballer

Willem Mwedihanga (born 7 January 1986) is a Namibian footballer who plays as a midfielder for the Namibia national team.

== Career ==
Mwedihanga began his career playing for Teenagers Football club in Ongwediva. He then moved to United Africa Tigers, where he made a name for himself as a centre back. In 2012, he joined Amazulu but only started playing for the club in January 2013. He later left Amazulu at the end of the 2014–15 season after they got relegated and joined University of Pretoria. In 2015, he led Namibia to their first international Cup COSAFA Cup conceding only one goal in over three matches.
