= Colin Esther =

Seychellois association football player

Colin Esther (born November 1, 1989) is a Seychellois footballer. He is a midfielder playing for Seychellois club La Passe and the Seychelles national football team and has represented Seychelles in the AFCON 2018.

== National team statistics ==
Seychelles national team
Year	Apps	Goals
2008	1	0
2009	1	0
2010	0	0
2011	0	0
2012	0	0
2013	3	1
2014	4	0
2015	4	0
2016	3	0
2017	5	0
2018	5	0
Total	27	1

=== International goals ===
Scores and results list Seychelles's goal tally first.

No.	Date	Venue	Opponent	Score	Result	Competition
1.	29 November 2013	Stade Linité, Victoria, Seychelles	Maldives	1–0	2–1	Friendly
