= Misheck Chaila =

Zambian footballer (born 1990)

Personal information
- Date of birth: 13 November 1990 (age 36)
- Place of birth: Lusaka, Zambia
- Height: 1.79 m (5 ft 10 in)
- Position: Midfielder

Team information
- Current team: Nkana
- Number: 13

Senior career*
Years	Team	Apps	(Gls)
2012–2015	Konkola Blades		
2015–2020	ZESCO United		
2020–	Nkana		

International career^{‡}
2013–	Zambia	13	(0)
- * Club domestic league appearances and goals ‡ National team caps and goals as of 6 March 2021

Misheck Chaila (born 13 November 1990) is a Zambian footballer who plays as a midfielder for Nkana F.C. and the Zambia national football team.

== Career ==
=== Club ===
In November 2020, Chaila moved to Nkana F.C., leaving ZESCO United.
