= Gift Moyo =

Motswana footballer (born 1990)

Personal information
- Date of birth: 20 August 1990 (age 36)
- Place of birth: Selebi-Phikwe, Botswana
- Height: 1.71 m (5 ft 7 in)
- Position: Forward

Team information
- Current team: Jwaneng Galaxy

Senior career*
Years	Team	Apps	(Gls)
2009–2010	Tse Tshweu		
2010–2017	Nico United		
2017–2018	Orapa United		
2018–	Jwaneng Galaxy		

International career^{‡}
2013–2018	Botswana	8	(0)
- * Club domestic league appearances and goals as of 3 October 2021 ‡ National team caps and goals as of 3 October 2021

Gift Moyo (born 20 August 1990) is a Motswana footballer who plays as a striker for Jwaneng Galaxy.
