= Noah Kareng =

Motswana footballer

Personal information
- Full name: Noah Kareng
- Place of birth: Botswana
- Position: Midfielder

Senior career*
Years	Team	Apps	(Gls)
1999–2007	Mochudi Centre Chiefs		

International career
2002	Botswana	1	(0)
- * Club domestic league appearances and goals

Noah Kareng is a Motswana former footballer who played as a midfielder. He played one match for the Botswana national football team in 2002.
