= Nkau Lerotholi =

Mosotho footballer (born 1990)

Personal information
- Full name: Nkau Lerotholi
- Date of birth: 27 September 1990 (age 36)
- Place of birth: Nazareth, Lesotho
- Position: Centre-back

Team information
- Current team: Matlama

Senior career*
Years	Team	Apps	(Gls)
2007–	Matlama		

International career^{‡}
2008–	Lesotho	50	(2)
- * Club domestic league appearances and goals ‡ National team caps and goals as of 18 November 2018

Nkau Lerotholi (born 27 September 1990) is a Mosotho footballer who plays as a centre-back for Matlama. He has won seven caps for the Lesotho national football team since 2000.

In summer 2011 Lerotholi was along Thapelo Tale on trial with Serbian SuperLiga club FK Jagodina.

== International career ==
=== International goals ===
Scores and results list Lesotho's goal tally first.

No.	Date	Venue	Opponent	Score	Result	Competition
1.	9 July 2013	Arthur Davies Stadium, Kitwe, Zambia	Botswana	2–2	3–3	2013 COSAFA Cup
2.	18 November 2018	Setsoto Stadium, Maseru, Lesotho	Tanzania	1–0	1–0	2019 Africa Cup of Nations qualification
