= Edward Weng =

Nigerian footballer

Personal information
- Full name: Ted Weng Edward Louis
- Date of birth: July 17, 1982 (age 44)
- Place of birth: Kurra Falls, Nigeria
- Position: Midfielder

Team information
- Current team: Plateau United F.C.

Senior career*
| Years | Team | Apps | (Gls) |
| 1998–1999 | Mighty Jets | | |
| 1999 | BCC Lions | | |
| 2000–2002 | Niger Tornadoes F.C. | | |
| 2002–2004 | El-Kanemi Warriors | | |
| 2004 | Plateau United F.C. | | |
| 2005–2010 | Kwara United F.C. | | |
| 2010–2012 | El-Kanemi Warriors | | |
| 2012– | Plateau United F.C. | | |
- * Club domestic league appearances and goals as of December 31, 2006

Ted Weng Edward Louis (born July 17, 1982, in Kurra Falls) is a Nigerian football player. As of May 2014, he played for Plateau United F.C. of Jos.

== Early career ==
Hails from Kurra Falls in the Barkin Ladi local government area of Plateau State. He is otherwise known as ‘Ze Roberto'.

== Career ==
He started his professional career with the Mighty Jets of Jos (1998–1999). He has played for BCC Lions FC of Gboko (1999), Niger Tornadoes F.C. of Minna (2000–2002), El-Kanemi Warriors FC of Maiduguri (2002–2004), Plateau United F.C. of Jos (2004) and Kwara United F.C. of Ilorin (2005). He played for the El-Kanemi Warriors of Maiduguri from 2010–2012, where he participated in the quarter-finals of the 2012 Federation Cup. Later in 2012, Weng became a free agent and returned to Plateau United.

== Titles ==
Weng was a National Challenge FA Cup winner with Niger Tornadoes F.C. in 2000, played in the West African Football Union (WAFU) Cup in 2000 and in the African Cup Winners (Mandela) Cup in 2001 with Niger Tornadoes.
