= Dirang Moloi =

Motswana footballer (born 1985)

Personal information
- Full name: Dirang Thirdboy Moloi
- Date of birth: 28 November 1985 (age 40)
- Place of birth: Gaborone, Botswana
- Height: 1.78 m (5 ft 10 in)
- Position: Attacking midfielder

Team information
- Current team: CS Don Bosco

Senior career*
Years	Team	Apps	(Gls)
	Notwane FC	?	(?)
2009–2013	Mochudi Centre Chiefs	?	(?)
2010–2011	→ Vasco da Gama (loan)	15	(1)
2013–	CS Don Bosco	?	(?)

International career^{‡}
2006–2013	Botswana	29	(0)
- * Club domestic league appearances and goals ‡ National team caps and goals as of 27 May 2017

Dirang Moloi (born 28 November 1985) is a Motswana footballer who plays for Botswana club Gaborone United in the Botswana Premier League.

== Career ==
Moloi started his senior career 2005 with Notwane FC in Gaborone. After four and a half years, he left Notwane and signed for Mochudi Centre Chiefs.

In 2010, the midfielder was loaned to Vasco da Gama of the South African Premier Soccer League. In April 2011, he returned to his club Mochudi Centre Chiefs.

In 2017, he signed with Gaborone United in the Botswana Premier League.

=== International ===
Moloi played in eleven games for the Botswana national football team.
