= Seabo Gabanakgosi =

Motswana footballer

Personal information
- Full name: Seabo Gabanakgosi
- Date of birth: 19 June 1979 (age 47)
- Place of birth: Botswana
- Position: Midfielder

Senior career*
Years	Team	Apps	(Gls)
1997–2007	Township Rollers		
2007–	Uniao Flamengo Santos		

International career
1998–2006	Botswana	8	(0)
- * Club domestic league appearances and goals

Seabo Gabanakgosi (born 19 June 1979) is a Motswana former footballer who played as a midfielder. He played for the Botswana national football team between 1998 and 2006.
