= Alton Meiring =

South African soccer player (1976–2024)

Personal information
- Date of birth: 5 March 1976
- Place of birth: Cape Town, Cape Province, South Africa
- Date of death: 29 September 2024 (aged 48)
- Place of death: Cape Town, Western Cape, South Africa
- Height: 1.77 m (5 ft 10 in)
- Position: Striker

Senior career*
| Years | Team | Apps | (Gls) |
| 1993–1996 | Hellenic | 10 | (3) |
| 1996–1999 | Cape Town Spurs | 51 | (17) |
| 1999–2000 | Mother City | 18 | (7) |
| 2000–2001 | Mamelodi Sundowns | 10 | (2) |
| 2001–2002 | AmaZulu | 16 | (8) |
| 2002–2005 | Manning Rangers | 69 | (23) |
| 2005–2007 | Golden Arrows | 44 | (15) |
| 2007–2009 | Moroka Swallows | 25 | (1) |
| 2009–2010 | Platinum Stars | 19 | (2) |
| 2010–2012 | Jomo Cosmos | 22 | (6) |

International career
| 2006 | South Africa | 2 | (0) |
- * Club domestic league appearances and goals

Alton Andrew Meiring (5 March 1976 – 29 September 2024) was a South African soccer striker, who played for several Premier Soccer League clubs and the South Africa national team.

On 29 September 2024, it was reported that Meiring had been stabbed to death. He was 48.
