= Surprise Moriri =

South African soccer player (born 1980)

Personal information
- Full name: Surprise Mohlomolleng Moriri
- Date of birth: 20 March 1980 (age 46)
- Place of birth: Matibidi, South Africa
- Height: 1.73 m (5 ft 8 in)
- Positions: Attacking midfielder; second striker

Youth career
- Wattville Watford Brothers

Senior career*
Years	Team	Apps	(Gls)
2002–2004	Silver Stars	51	(19)
2004–2016	Mamelodi Sundowns	115	(39)
2016–2017	Highlands Park	22	(2)
Total		188	(60)

International career
2003–2010	South Africa	34	(5)
- * Club domestic league appearances and goals as of 27 May 2017

Surprise Mohlomolleng Moriri (born 20 March 1980) is a South African former professional soccer player who played as a midfielder or striker. He also represented South Africa as an international and amassed 34 caps during his time with the South Africa national team from 2003-2010.

== Club career ==
Moriri was a free-scoring midfielder who was chosen as South Africa's PSL Player of the Season in 2005–06. He usually played as a second striker or behind the striker as a supporting or shadow striker. He was also deployed on the right side of midfield. He scored 12 goals in all competitions (11 in the league) to be Sundowns' top scorer and help the 'Brazilians' to their first league title since 2000.

In the 2006–07 season he eclipsed that amount, once again scoring eleven league goals to go along with three in the CAF Champions League.

The 2007–08 season was a less prolific league campaign for him in which he only managed three league goals. However, he was more successful in other competitions that season, scoring two Nedbank Cup goals, one MTN 8 goal, one Tekom Knockout goal, and four CAF Champions League, a total of 11 cup goals.

On 18 June 2007, Sundowns played a friendly against FC Barcelona in South Africa. Moriri scored within one minute and 30 seconds to make it 1–0. After many missed chances from both teams, Barcelona eventually went on to win the game 2–1 after two late goals from substitutes Santiago Ezquerro and Marc Crosas Luque.

== International career ==
Moriri made his debut in a friendly match against Lesotho on 8 October 2003.

He scored his first goal for South Africa in their 3–0 win over Chad in the MTN Africa Cup of Nations qualifiers.

He was in the South African squad for the 2008 African Nations Cup.

He was part of the Bafana Bafana squad for the 2010 World Cup, coming off the bench against Uruguay.

== International goals ==
#	Date	Venue	Opponent	Score	Result	Competition
1	2007-03-24	Ndjamena, Chad	Chad	1–0	3–0	African Nations Cup qualifier
2	2008-03-26	Atteridgeville, South Africa	Paraguay	1–0	3–0	Friendly
3	2008-06-07	Atteridgeville, South Africa	Equatorial Guinea	2–1	4–1	WCQ
4	2010-04-28	Berlin, Germany	Jamaica	2–0	2–0	Friendly
5	2010-05-31	Polokwane, South Africa	Guatemala	3–0	5–0	Friendly

== Honours ==
Mameloni Sundowns

- CAF Champions League: 2016
