= Lovemore Mokgweetsi =

Motswana footballer (born 1974)

Personal information
- Full name: Lovemore Mokgweetsi
- Date of birth: 9 October 1974 (age 52)
- Place of birth: Botswana
- Position: Defender

Team information
- Current team: tafic
- Number: 4

Senior career*
Years	Team	Apps	(Gls)
2000–2007	Centre Chiefs		
2007–	TAFIC		

International career
2000	Botswana	2	(0)
- * Club domestic league appearances and goals

Lovemore Mokgweetsi (born 9 October 1974) is a Motswana footballer who plays as a defender for TAFIC. He played for the Botswana national football team in 2000, including a 1–0 loss to Zambia in World Cup qualifying on 22 April 2000.
