= Dave Mussard =

Seychellois association football player

Personal information
- Full name: Dave Mussard
- Date of birth: 8 February 1987 (age 39)
- Place of birth: Seychelles
- Position: Goalkeeper

International career
Years	Team	Apps	(Gls)
2011–	Seychelles	2	(0)

Dave Mussard (born 8 February 1987) is a Seychellois football player and chef. He is a goalkeeper playing for the Seychelles national football team and has represented Seychelles in the AFCON 2018.

== Internet Sensation ==
Mussard became an internet sensation during the AFCON 2018 qualifiers. He went viral because of his large shape as a goalkeeper, his daytime job is also a chef at a hotel in Seychelles. According to publications, most of the team members have daytime jobs and like Mussard they all had to beg for time off in order to play the AFCON cup.
