= Masimba Mambare =

Zimbabwean footballer (born 1986)

Personal information
- Full name: Masimba Keen Mambare
- Date of birth: 9 May 1986 (age 40)
- Place of birth: Harare, Zimbabwe
- Height: 1.79 m (5 ft 10 in)
- Position: Midfielder

Senior career*
| Years | Team | Apps | (Gls) |
| 2005–2006 | Amabhubhesi | | |
| 2006–2008 | Ziscosteel | | |
| 2008–2012 | Motor Action | | |
| 2012–2014 | Highlanders | | |
| 2014–2017 | Dynamos | | |
| 2018–2019 | Black Rhinos F.C. | | |

International career
| 2013–2017 | Zimbabwe | 19 | (4) |
- * Club domestic league appearances and goals

Masimba Keen Mambare (born 9 May 1986) is a Zimbabwean former professional footballer who played as a midfielder. He played for the Zimbabwe national team at international level.

== Club career ==
Mambare started his career with second division sides Amabhubhesi and Ziscosteel before joining top-tier side Motor Action. He stayed with Motor Action for four years until he departed to join Highlanders in 2012. He left Highlanders two years later as his contract ran out, he subsequently joined Highlanders' rivals Dynamos, on a three-year contract, amidst a legal battle with Highlanders over unpaid bonuses.

== International career ==
Mambare has won 11 caps and scored 4 goals for the Zimbabwe national team. His first international goal came against Malawi in the 2013 COSAFA Cup.

== Career statistics ==
As of 26 June 2016

| National team | Year | Apps | Goals |
|---|---|---|---|
| Zimbabwe | 2013 | 5 | 3 |
| Zimbabwe | 2014 | 3 | 1 |
| Zimbabwe | 2015 | 3 | 0 |
| Zimbabwe | 2016 | 0 | 0 |
| Total | | 11 | 4 |

As of 26 June 2016 Scores and results list Zimbabwe's goal tally first.

| Goal | Date | Venue | Opponent | Score | Result | Competition |
|---|---|---|---|---|---|---|
| 1 | 13 July 2013 | Nkoloma Stadium, Lusaka, Zambia | Malawi | 1–0 | 1–1 | 2013 COSAFA Cup |
| 2 | 4 August 2013 | Rufaro Stadium, Harare, Zimbabwe | Mauritius | 1–0 | 1–1 | 2014 African Nations Championship qualification |
| 3 | 8 September 2013 | Rufaro Stadium, Harare, Zimbabwe | Mozambique | 1–0 | 1–1 | 2014 FIFA World Cup qualification |
| 4 | 20 January 2014 | Athlone Stadium, Cape Town, South Africa | Burkina Faso | 1–0 | 1–0 | 2014 African Nations Championship |

== Honours ==
Motor Action

- Zimbabwe Premier Soccer League: 2010

Highlanders

- Mbada Diamonds Cup: 2013

Dynamos

- Zimbabwe Premier Soccer League: 2014
