= Lethola Mofokeng =

South African soccer player (born 1984)

Personal information
- Full name: Lethola Samson Mofokeng
- Date of birth: 20 October 1984 (age 42)
- Place of birth: Bethlehem, South Africa
- Height: 1.80 m (5 ft 11 in)
- Position: Midfielder

Senior career*
| Years | Team | Apps | (Gls) |
| 2003–2009 | Jomo Cosmos | | |
| 2009–2010 | Black Leopards | | |
| 2010–2011 | Mpumalanga Black Aces | 5 | (0) |
| 2011–2012 | Bloemfontein Celtic | 17 | (1) |
| 2012–2013 | Jomo Cosmos | 5 | (0) |
- * Club domestic league appearances and goals

Lethola Mofokeng (born 20 October 1984) is a South African professional soccer player who played as a midfielder.

== Career ==
Mofokeng began his professional career in 2003 with Jomo Cosmos. He was released from his contract in January 2009, and signed with Black Leopards in February 2009.
