= Kgosi Letlape =

South African ophthalmologist and politician

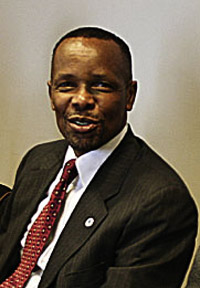
- Letlape in 2007

Member of Parliament
- Incumbent
- Assumed office 2024

Personal details
- Born: April 14, 1959 (age 67)
- Party: ActionSA
- Other political affiliations: ANC
- Profession: Ophthalmologist

Tebogo Kgosietsile Solomon Letlape (born 14 April 1959) is an ophthalmologist, health care leader, and Member of Parliament in South Africa.

== Career ==
He is the past President of the Health Professions Council of South Africa (HPCSA). He founded the Africa Medical Association (AMA) in 2006, and is former chairman of the South African Medical Association (SAMA), past president of the World Medical Association (WMA) and former Executive Director of the Tshepang Trust. He also serves as a member of The Global Hygiene Council.

Dr Letlape made history by becoming the first black person in South Africa to qualify as an ophthalmologist during the apartheid years. He was also the first black person to be elected as President of the World Medical Association (WMA), the global representative body for physicians around the world.

In an effort to ensure access to less harmful products and healthcare for all, Dr Letlape co-founded the Africa Harm Reduction Alliance (AHRA), which focuses on creating awareness and educating people about the need to reduce harm and promote well-being.

As a health activist, Dr Letlape's long-standing interest in equal health care for South Africans has seen him participating in various health committees and task teams. In 2002, together with the Nelson Mandela Foundation and the South African Medical Association (SAMA), he established the Tshepang Trust, a not-for-profit organisation, serving as its executive director until 2013.

At the request of the late President Nelson Mandela in 2003, Dr Letlape embarked on what was regarded as an ambitious project at the time, to provide HIV-positive patients access to antiretroviral treatment. This entailed collaborating with state hospitals to facilitate the treatment of HIV-positive patients when none was provided by the government of the time.

On the 14 June 2024, he was sworn in as a Member of Parliament representing ActionSA.

== See also ==
- List of National Assembly members of the 27th Parliament of South Africa
