= Rudzani Ramudzuli =

South African soccer player

Personal information
- Full name: Rudzani Reuben Ramudzuli
- Date of birth: 10 May 1983 (age 43)
- Place of birth: Nzhelele, South Africa
- Height: 1.74 m (5 ft 9 in)
- Position: Right winger

Youth career
- Rabali All Stars
- Rabali Pull Together

Senior career*
Years	Team	Apps	(Gls)
2001–2007	Black Leopards	?	(?)
2007–2009	Orlando Pirates	?	(?)
2009–2010	Supersport United	0	(0)
- * Club domestic league appearances and goals

Rudzani Ramudzuli (born 10 May 1983 in Nzhelele, Transvaal) is a South African association footballer, who last played for Supersport United in the Premier Soccer League.
