= Lot Chiwunga =

Zimbabwean footballer (born 1986)

Personal information
- Date of birth: 6 December 1986 (age 39)
- Place of birth: Kadoma, Zimbabwe
- Position: Forward

Team information
- Current team: Black Rhinos

Youth career
- Dynamos

Senior career*
Years	Team	Apps	(Gls)
2006	Kambuzuma United		
2007	Windsor		
2008–2012	Douglas Warriors		
2012–	Black Rhinos		

International career^{‡}
2013–	Zimbabwe	2	(0)
- * Club domestic league appearances and goals ‡ National team caps and goals as of 20:21, 17 May 2018 (UTC)

Lot Chiwunga (born 6 December 1986) is a Zimbabwean footballer who plays as a forward for Zimbabwe Premier Soccer League side Black Rhinos and the Zimbabwe national team.

== Club career ==
Chiwunga started in the youth set-up of Dynamos before moving into senior football with Kambuzuma United. His stay with Kambuzuma was short as he soon left to join Windsor and then Douglas Warriors. He won promotion with Douglas Warriors in 2009. He remained with the latter for four years before joining second division club Black Rhinos and again won promotion, this time in 2012.

== International career ==
Chiwunga has won two caps for the Zimbabwe national team. His first call-up came for the 2013 COSAFA Cup in Zambia, he missed a spot-kick in Zimbabwe's quarter-final win over Malawi in a penalty shoot-out. His other cap for his nation came in the final of the aforementioned competition. He was selected in Ian Gorowa's provisional squad for the 2014 African Nations Championship but was overlooked when the final squad was confirmed.

== Career statistics ==
As of 15 April 2017

National team	Year	Apps	Goals
Zimbabwe	2013	2	0
Total		2	0
