= Motlalepula Mofolo =

Mosotho footballer (born 1986)

Personal information
- Full name: Motlalepula Mofolo
- Date of birth: 7 September 1986 (age 40)
- Place of birth: Teyateyaneng, Berea District, Lesotho
- Position: Central midfielder

Team information
- Current team: Lioli FC (Assistant Coach)

Youth career
- 1999–2003: Likuena High School
- 2004–2005: Orlando Pirates

Senior career*
Years	Team	Apps	(Gls)
2006–2009	Orlando Pirates	17	(0)
2010– 2018	Lioli FC	56	(21)
2013–2013	MC Saïda	4	(0)

International career^{‡}
2007– 2015	Lesotho	5	(0)
- * Club domestic league appearances and goals ‡ National team caps and goals as of 13:41, 28 September 2024 (UTC)

Motlalepula Mofolo (born 7 September 1986) is a retired Mosotho footballer who played for Lioli FC. He is currently Co-Assistant Coach of Lioli FC together with Shetsane Ramoseeka.

== International career ==
Since 2007, Mofolo has won five caps for the Lesotho national football team.
