= Jimmy Chisenga =

Zambian footballer (born 1992)

Personal information
- Full name: Jimmy Mulilo Chisenga Chilufya
- Date of birth: 3 April 1992 (age 34)
- Place of birth: Lusaka, Zambia
- Height: 1.79 m (5 ft 10 in)
- Position: Right back

Team information
- Current team: Red Arrows

Senior career*
Years	Team	Apps	(Gls)
2008–	Red Arrows		

International career^{‡}
2009–2014	Zambia	26	(2)
- * Club domestic league appearances and goals as of 7 October 2020 ‡ National team caps and goals as of 7 October 2020

Jimmy Mulilo Chisenga Chilufya (born 3 April 1992) is a Zambian professional footballer who plays as a right back for Red Arrows. He represented Zambia national team between 2009 and 2014, scoring twice.
