= Mochudi Centre Chiefs SC =

- Full name: Mochudi Centre Chiefs Sporting Club
- Nicknames: Magosi, Maaparankwe, Kwaa Rra Tswee-tswee
- Founded: 1972
- Ground: Botswana National Stadium; Gaborone, Botswana; Molepolole Stadium
- Capacity: 22 000
- Chairman: Victor Kobe
- Manager: Miguel Corral
- League: Botswana Premier League
- 2025–2026: 4th
Home colours	Away colours

Mochudi Centre Chiefs Sporting Club is a professional football club based in Mochudi, Botswana, who play in the Botswana Premier League after acquiring the license from Masitaoka, returning to the highest level following relegation from the Premier League in 2019. Centre Chiefs have won the Botswana Premier League, the highest level of Botswana football, four times. The team originates from Mochudi, a large village on the outskirts of Gaborone, the national capital.

== History ==
Mochudi Centre Chiefs were founded in 1972 by local elders.

Centre Chiefs had their first major success in 2008 when they won the Botswana Premier League, when they went through the whole season undefeated. The Chiefs then won back-to-back titles in 2011-12 and 2012-13. They subsequently won various cup competitions between 2008 and 2015. The club has enjoyed its greatest period of success in the past decade, winning 15 trophies since. Domestically, Mochudi Centre Chiefs have won four league titles, four Kabelano Charity Cups, One Coca-Cola Cup and One Super Cup, while in continental competitions they regularly compete in CAF Champions League.

Mochudi Centre Chiefs’ home kit colours are jet black and pearl white, while away colours are ruby red and pearl white. Mochudi Centre Chiefs has been owned by the Jamali and Letshwiti families.

The Chiefs players went on strike in 2018 after a payment dispute. After a difficult season, Chiefs were relegated to the second division with one game to play. Following their relegation, the Centre Chiefs continued to play in the Botswana First Division South until 2024. Even though finishing outside of the promotion spots, and being deducted 4 points, the team acquired the Premier League license of Masitaoka.

== Achievements ==
- Botswana Premier League: 4

Winners: 2007–08, 2011–12, 2012–13, 2014–15

- FA Challenge Cup (Botswana): 1

2008

== Performance in CAF competitions ==
- CAF Cup: 2 appearances

1997 - Second Round
2000 - First Round

- CAF Cup Winners' Cup: 1 appearance

1992 - First Round

== Notable players ==
Botswana

- (Botswana) Seabo Gabanakgosi
- (Botswana) Noah Kareng
- (Botswana) William Kehitilwe
- (Botswana) Sekhana Koko
- (Botswana) Barolong Lemmenyane
- (Botswana) Mpho Mabogo
- (Botswana) Kgosietsile Mampori
- (Botswana) Noah Maposa
- (Botswana) Oteng Moalosi
- (Botswana) Lovemore Mokgweetsi
- (Botswana) Dirang Moloi
- (Botswana) Galabgwe Moyana
- (Botswana) Kekaetswe Moloi
- (Botswana) Raphael Nthwane
- (Botswana) Keitumetse Paul
- (Botswana) Molathegi Podile
- (Botswana) Jerome Ramatlhakwane
- (Botswana) Innocent Ranku
- (Botswana) Gobonyeone Selefa
- (Botswana) Thato Siska
- (Botswana) James Tshekedi

South Africa

- (South Africa) Tshweu Makhoere

Zambia

- (Zambia) Linos Chalwe
- (Zambia) James Kachinga
- (Zambia) Musonda Mweuke

Zimbabwe

- (Zimbabwe) Itayi Gwandu
- (Zimbabwe) Otsile Moje

== Notable coaches ==
- (Zambia) Beston Chambeshi
- (Zambia) Mike Sithole (2007)
- (Zambia) Rahman Gumbo (2010)
- (Serbia) Dragojlo Stanojlović (2013–14)
- (Zambia) Mike Sithole (2014–present)
