= Index of Mauritius-related articles =

The following is an index of Mauritius-related topics by alphabetical order. For a list by topic, see list of Mauritius-related topics

== ! ==
.mu

== 1-9 ==
=== 1 ===
114 (number) - 115 (number)

=== 2 ===
2009 Mauritian Cup final - 2009–10 South-West Indian Ocean cyclone season - 2010 Mauritian Cup final - 2010 Mauritian League - 2010 Republic Cup final - 2010–11 South-West Indian Ocean cyclone season - 2011 Mauritian League - 2011–12 South-West Indian Ocean cyclone season - 2021 in Mauritius - 2022 in Mauritius - 20th parallel south - 230 (number)

=== 5 ===
59th (2nd Nottinghamshire) Regiment of Foot

=== 9 ===
999 (emergency telephone number)

== A ==
A Voyage to Terra Australis - Aapravasi Ghat - Abdool Razack Mohamed - Abel Tasman - Aboobakar Augustin - Abraham Momber van de Velde - Abricta - Abu Kasenally - Acacia floribunda - Acanthophoenix rubra - Achaea umbrigera - Acrocercops macrochalca - Actaeon - Additional Mathematics in Mauritius - Adriaan van der Stel - Adrien d'Épinay - AfrAsia Bank - African and Malagasy Union - African currency - African Economic Community - African French - African Nuclear Weapon Free Zone Treaty - African Peer Review Mechanism - African people - African Securities Exchanges Association - African Tax Administration Forum - African Telecommunications Union - African tourism by country - African, Caribbean and Pacific Group of States - Africanogyrus rodriguezensis - Africa's Special Economic Zones - AfriNIC - Agalega Islands - Aganais borbonica - Ages of consent in Africa - Agonostomus telfairii - Agriocnemis exilis - Air Mauritius - Air Mauritius destinations - Airline codes-I - Ajay Daby - Akash Choolun - Alan Rogers (bishop) - Albin Roussin - Albizia vaughanii - Alessandro Cevese - Alfred Potiquet - Alix D'Unienville - Alliance of Small Island States - Alliance of the Future - Alliance Sociale - Alloblennius anuchalis - Allyson Jolicoeur - Almondo Fricain - Amateur radio call signs of Africa - Ambroise Louis Garneray - Amédée Maingard - Anaïs Veerapatren - Anchor coinage - Ancylosis - Andy Sophie - Anerood Jugnauth - Angidi Chettiar - Anglican Diocese of Saldanha Bay - Anglo-Dutch Java War - Angraecum cadetii - Anil Bachoo - Anil Gayan - Anisomeles malabarica - Anna Brassey, Baroness Brassey - Anne Antoine, Comte d'Aché - Anne Joseph Hippolyte de Maurès, Comte de Malartic - Annuaires Afrique - Anomaly (Primeval) - Anse aux Anglais - Anthony Delpech - Anthony van Diemen - Anund Neewoor - Aphanapteryx - Apollo 11 goodwill messages - Apollo Hospitals - Apostolic Vicariate of Rodrigues - Appleby Spurling Hunter - Arassen Ragaven - Argiocnemis solitaria - Argyrogramma signata - Arild Eik - Ariranga Pillay - Ark on the Move (TV series) - Arnaud Casquette - Arnhem (ship) - Arsenal Wanderers - Arthur Hamilton-Gordon, 1st Baron Stanmore - Arthur Havelock - Arthur Purves Phayre - Arvin Boolell - Arya Samaj in Mauritius - AS de Vacoas-Phoenix - AS Port-Louis 2000 - AS Quatre Bornes - AS Rivière du Rempart - Ashik Punchoo - Ashley Lemince - Ashok Chundunsing - Ashok Jugnauth - Asplenium daucifolium - Association of International Accountants - Astelia - Auguste Toussaint

== B ==
- B4U (network) - B4U Movies - B4U Music - Babla & Kanchan - Badula crassa - Badula platyphylla - Badula reticulata - Baie aux Huîtres - Baie-du-Tombeau - Bambous, Mauritius - Banaras (2006 film) - Bango (music) - Bank of Baroda - Bank of Mauritius - Bank of Mauritius Tower - Banque Française Commerciale Océan Indien - Barclays Bank Mauritius - Bareback shovelnose ray - Barleria observatrix - Battle of Grand Port - Battle of Porto Praya - Battle of Tamatave - Beau-Bassin Rose-Hill - Bede Edmund Hugh Clifford - Begonia salaziensis - Bel Air Rivière Sèche - Bel Ombre, Mauritius - Bénarès - Benoit Bouchet - Bertrand-François Mahé de La Bourdonnais - Bhojpuri language - Big C Vietnam - Bihari cuisine - Bihari Mauritian - Bihari people - Billy Jacobson - Bindi (decoration) - Birla Institute of Technology, Mesra - Bishop of Mauritius - Black River District - Black River Gorges National Park - Blue Penny Museum - Blue pigeon - Blue-tailed day gecko - Bobre - Bojer's skink - Bollywood - Bolyeriidae - Borbo borbonica - Bornetella nitida - Le Morne Brabant - Brenthia leptocosma - British Colonial Auxiliary Forces - British Empire - British Indian Ocean Territory - British undergraduate degree classification - Broad-billed parrot - Broadsheet - Brownea coccinea - Brown-marbled grouper - Bruno Julie - Bruno Ravina - BS 7671 - Bulinus cernicus - Bullia mauritiana

== C ==
C. typica - HMS Mauritius (C80) - Cabinet of Ministers of Mauritius- Cabrera - Caesalpinia decapetala - Caldwellia imperfecta - Caldwellia philyrina - Caleb Francis - Callicercops triceros - Calodyne - Canarium - Canarium paniculatum- Cancilla praestantissima - Cape canary - Cape Malheureux- Capture of Belle Île - Cargados Carajos - Carl Hilsenberg- Casearia - Casearia mauritiana - Casearia tinifolia - Cassam Moollan - Cassam Uteem - Cassis- Cassiya - Cathay Pacific destinations - Catovair- Caudan Waterfront - Cecil Cherrington - Cédric Permal- Censorship of Facebook - Census - Central banks and currencies of Africa - Centre de Flacq - Cephalopholis boenak - Cephonodes apus- Cephonodes trochilus - Cereus Blooms at Night - Ceriagrion glabrum - Ceridian - Cesar B. Cabrera - César Benito Cabrera- Chagos Archipelago - Chagossian Creole - Chagossians- Chamarel - Champ de Mars - Champ de Mars Racecourse- Charles Allix Lavington Yate - Charles Bruce (governor) - Charles Cavendish Boyle - Charles Colville - Charles Content - Charles E. Johnson (businessman) - Charles John Irving - Charles Lees (colonial administrator) - Charles Marsh Schomberg - Charles Mathieu Isidore Decaen - Charles Robert Malden - Charles Swanston- Charles Telfair - Charles William Barkley - Charles-Édouard Brown-Séquard - Château of Réduit - Chettiar - Cheval tree - Camille Charles Leclerc, Chevalier de Fresne - Chhath - Chief Commissioner - Chief executive (gubernatorial) - Chikungunya outbreaks - Chinatowns in Africa - Choreutis ialeura - Choreutis ialeura - Choreutis turilega - Chris Hackel - Christianity in Mauritius - Christopher Bazerque - Christopher Ironside - Christopher Perle - Chrysoblephus laticeps - Church of the Province of the Indian Ocean - Clarisse - Clathrus mauritianus - Claude de Baissac - Cliff L'Aimable - Clifford Lincoln- Clothing in Mauritius - Coat of arms of Mauritius - Coelonia solani - Coenagriocnemis insulare - Coëtivy Island - Colin Bell (footballer born 1979) - Collège du Saint-Esprit - Coloured - Colparion madgei - Colvillea - Colvillea racemosa - Combined Joint Task Force – Horn of Africa - Commander-in-chief - Common Market for Eastern and Southern Africa - Commonwealth banknote-issuing institutions - Commonwealth Broadcasting Association - Commonwealth citizen - Commonwealth Heads of Government Meeting 2009 - Commonwealth Judo Championships - Commonwealth Pool Lifesaving Championships - Community of Portuguese Language Countries - Compendium of postage stamp issuers (Ma – Md) - Confederation of African Football - Confederation of African Tennis - Constituencies of Mauritius - Conus aulicus - Convention on Fishing and Conservation of Living Resources of the High Seas - Conyers Dill & Pearman - Coracina - Cordemoya integrifolia - Cornelis Matelief de Jonge - Cornelius Gooyer - Corporate Registers Forum - Corps de Garde - Corruption in Mauritius - COSAFA Senior Challenge Cup - Cottage Industries Exposition Limited - Court piece - Crown Colony class cruiser - Cryptopus - Cryptostegia grandiflora - Ctenoglypta newtoni - Ctenophila caldwelli - Cuisine of Mauritius - Culture of the Indian Ocean Islands - Culture of Mauritius - Curepipe Botanic Gardens - Curepipe- Curepipe Starlight SC - Currencies of the British West Indies - Cyclone Elita - Cyclone Gamede - Cyclone Hollanda - Cyclone Hondo - Cyligramma limacina - Cylindraspis - Cylindrocline commersonii - Cylindrocline lorencei - Cyril Golding-Bird - Cyril Mourgine

== D ==
Drugs in Mauritius

== F ==
Financial Services Commission (Mauritius) - Flic en Flac - Fond du Sac

== G ==
Ganga Talao - Geography of Mauritius - Grand Baie - Grand Gaube - Grande Rivière Sud Est - Grande Rivière Noire - Guttural toad

== H ==
Hawkins Bank - History of Mauritius - History of rail transport in Mauritius

== I ==
Île aux Cerfs - Île de la Passe - Île Plate - Independent Commission Against Corruption (Mauritius) - Islets of Mauritius

== L ==
Le Morne - Le Morne Brabant - LGBT rights in Mauritius - List of cities, towns and villages in Mauritius - List of people on stamps of Mauritius - List of rivers of Mauritius

== M ==
Mahébourg - Mapou - Mare aux Vacoas - Mauritian Maroons - Mauritius at the Olympics - Mauritius at the 1984 Summer Olympics - Mauritius at the 1988 Summer Olympics - Mauritius at the 1992 Summer Olympics - Mauritius at the 1996 Summer Olympics - Mauritius at the 2000 Summer Olympics - Mauritius at the 2004 Summer Olympics - Mauritius at the 2008 Summer Olympics - Mauritius Bank - Mauritius Commercial Bank - Mauritius Post - Mauritius "Post Office" stamps - Midlands, Mauritius - Ministry of Tourism (Mauritius) - Moka - Mont Malartic - Montagne Cocotte

== N ==
Nepalis in Mauritius

== O ==
Open University of Mauritius

== P ==
Petit Bel Air - Pieter Both (mountain) - Piton de la Petite Rivière Noire - Port Louis - Port Mathurin - Postage stamps and postal history of Mauritius

== Q ==
Quartier Militaire - Quatre Bornes

== R ==
Réduit (Mauritius) - Revenue stamps of Mauritius - Rivière des Créoles - Rivière du Rempart (river) - Rivière Tamarin - Rivière du Tombeau - Rodrigues - Rose-Belle - Rose-Hill, Mauritius - Round Island

== S ==
Saya de Malha Bank - Souillac, Mauritius - Soudan Banks - St. Pierre, Mauritius - Statistics Mauritius

== T ==
Tamarin, Mauritius - Tamarind Falls - Triolet, Mauritius - Trou aux Biches - Trou aux Cerfs

== V ==
Vacoas-Phoenix - Vingt-Cinq

== See also ==
- Index of Europe-related articles - similar lists for other countries
- Index of Africa-related articles - similar lists for other countries
- Index of Asia-related articles - similar lists for other countries
- List of Mauritius-related topics
- Lists of country-related topics
