= A. catalai =

A. catalai may refer to:

- Abacetus catalai, a ground beetle
- Agonostomus catalai, a fish found in Africa
