= Bill Jacobsen =

Bill or Billy Jacobsen may refer to:

- Bill McLeod Jacobsen (born 1974), Faroe Islands national under-21 football team coach
- Billy Jacobsen, American 2017 Pickleball Hall of Fame inductee

== See also ==
- Bill Jacobson (born 1955), American photographer
- Billy Jacobson (born 1980), South African jockey
- William Jacobsen (disambiguation)
