= 2009 Mauritian Cup final =

The 2009 Mauritian Cup final took place on 17 May 2009 at the Sir Gaëtan Duval Stadium in Mauritius. The match was contested by Etoile de l'Ouest and Pamplemousses SC. Pamplemousses SC won the final 6-1 with a hat-trick from Hubert Robson.

== Match ==
17 May 2009

Etoile de l'Ouest	1 - 6	Pamplemousses SC
Olivier Rakotomala 42'		Olivier Rakotomala 7' (o.g.); Hubert Robson 28' 57' 89'; Kersley Jolicoeur 62'; Williamo Randriamanjato 78'

Sir Gaëtan Duval Stadium, Rose-Hill
Referee: Imtiaz Heeralall

Etoile de l'Ouest	Pamplemousses SC
Didier Gopaul	Nicolas Doro
Mahanand Etwah	Charles Content
Olivier Rakotomala	Cyril Mourgine (substituted off) 85'
Rishi Jeebun	Henri Spéville
Jean-Yves André (substituted off) 63'	Frédéric Chavry
Pascal Gaiki	Giovanni Jeannot (substituted off) 89'
Vishal Bhugmon (substituted off) 55'	Gilbert Bayaram (c)
Stéphane Badul (substituted off) 77'	Colin Bell
Jaïrzihno L'Effronté (c)	Kersley Jolicoeur (substituted off) 86'
Benjamina Rakotoarison	Hubert Robson
Jean-Aimée Randriasalama	Williamo Randriamanjato
Substitutes:	Substitutes:
Bernard August (substituted in) 55'	Jérémy Guillaume (substituted in) 85'
Hemant Kumar Sookroo (substituted in) 63'	Mike Kayava (substituted in) 86'
Pascal Pauline (substituted in) 77'	Clarel Beeharry (substituted in) 89'
Coach :	Coach :
Mervyn Édouard	Henri Spéville
