= ST8 =

ST8 may refer to:

- ST8, a part of the United Kingdom's ST postcode area
- ST8, an amateur radio call sign in Al'Fashir, Sudan
- "St8", a song on the 2011 album Life in the Trenches
- ST8 - General Insurance - Pricing Specialist Technical, an examination of the United Kingdom's Institute of Actuaries
- ST8: Temple-City of Orcus, a roleplaying game sourcebook by Greg A. Vaughan
- St8 - casino games API aggregator

== See also ==
- Star Trek: First Contact, the eighth Star Trek film
- State (disambiguation)
