= Rivière des Galets =

Rivière des Galets may refer to:

- Rivière des Galets (Kerguelen)
- Rivière des Galets (Mauritius), a river in Mauritius
- Rivière des Galets (Réunion), a river in Réunion
