= 2010 Republic Cup final =

The 2010 Republic Cup final took place on 18 July 2010 at the Anjalay Stadium in Mauritius. The match was contested by Pamplemousses SC and Petite Rivière Noire SC. The match was still goalless after extra-time, and Pamplemousses eventually won the final in the penalty shootout 6–5.

== Match ==
18 July 2010	Pamplemousses SC	0 - 0 (a.e.t.) (6-5 p)	Petite Rivière Noire SC	Stade Anjalay, Belle Vue
	Penalties
	-		-

Pamplemousses SC	Petite Rivière Noire FC
Kevin Jean-Louis	Jean-Paul Ammomoothoo
Jérémy Guillaume	Hemant Gupta Sookroo (yellow card) 24'
Cyril Mourgine (substituted off) 117'	Leroy Figaro (red card) 57'
Lalaina Ralantoarinina	Almondo Fricain
Frédéric Chavry	Christopher Bazerque
Guillaume Sockalingum	Jean-François Martingale (substituted off) 70'
Charles Content	Samuel Rebet
Colin Bell	Stéphane Pierre
Jean-Yves Noumé (substituted off) 46'	Dany Février (substituted off) 99'
Williamo Randriamanjato (substituted off) 74'	Andy Patate (substituted off) 111'
Hubert Robson	Francis Rasolofonirina (yellow card) 54'
Substitutes:	Substitutes:
Gilbert Bayaram (yellow card) 90+1' (substituted on) 46'	Genario Figaro (substituted on) 70'
Gravel Azie (substituted on) 74'	Elvis Gertry (substituted on) 99'
Pramanand Naugon (substituted on) 117'	Frédérik Antoine (substituted on) 111'
Coach :	Coach :
Henri Spéville	Taleb Fatehmamode
