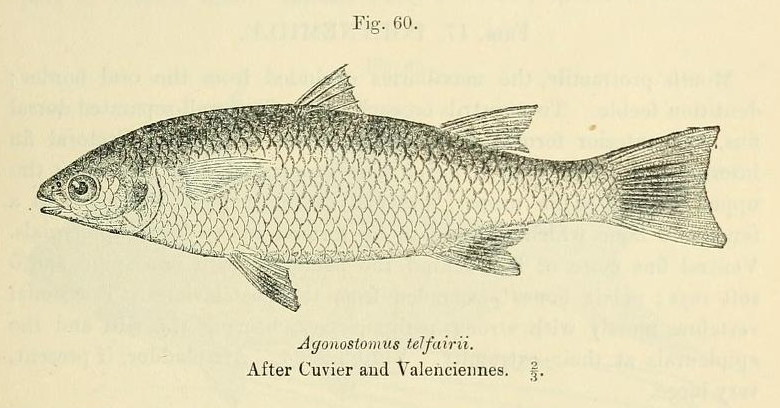
- Agonostomus telfairii

Scientific classification
- Kingdom: Animalia
- Phylum: Chordata
- Class: Actinopterygii
- Order: Mugiliformes
- Family: Mugilidae
- Genus: Agonostomus; E. T. Bennett, 1832

Type species
- Agonostomus telfairii Bennett 1832

Synonyms
- Agonostoma Günther, 1861; Nestis Valenciennes, 1836

= Agonostomus =

Genus of ray-finned fishes

Agonostomus is a genus of ray-finned fish in the family Mugilidae, the mullets. Considered to be the most primitive of the mullets, they are generally marine fish (though they spend much of their adult lives in freshwater). The two members of the genus occur in the Indian Ocean.

== Species ==
There are currently two recognized species in this genus:

- Agonostomus catalai Pellegrin, 1932 – Comoro mullet
- Agonostomus telfairii E. T. Bennett, 1832 – fairy mullet
