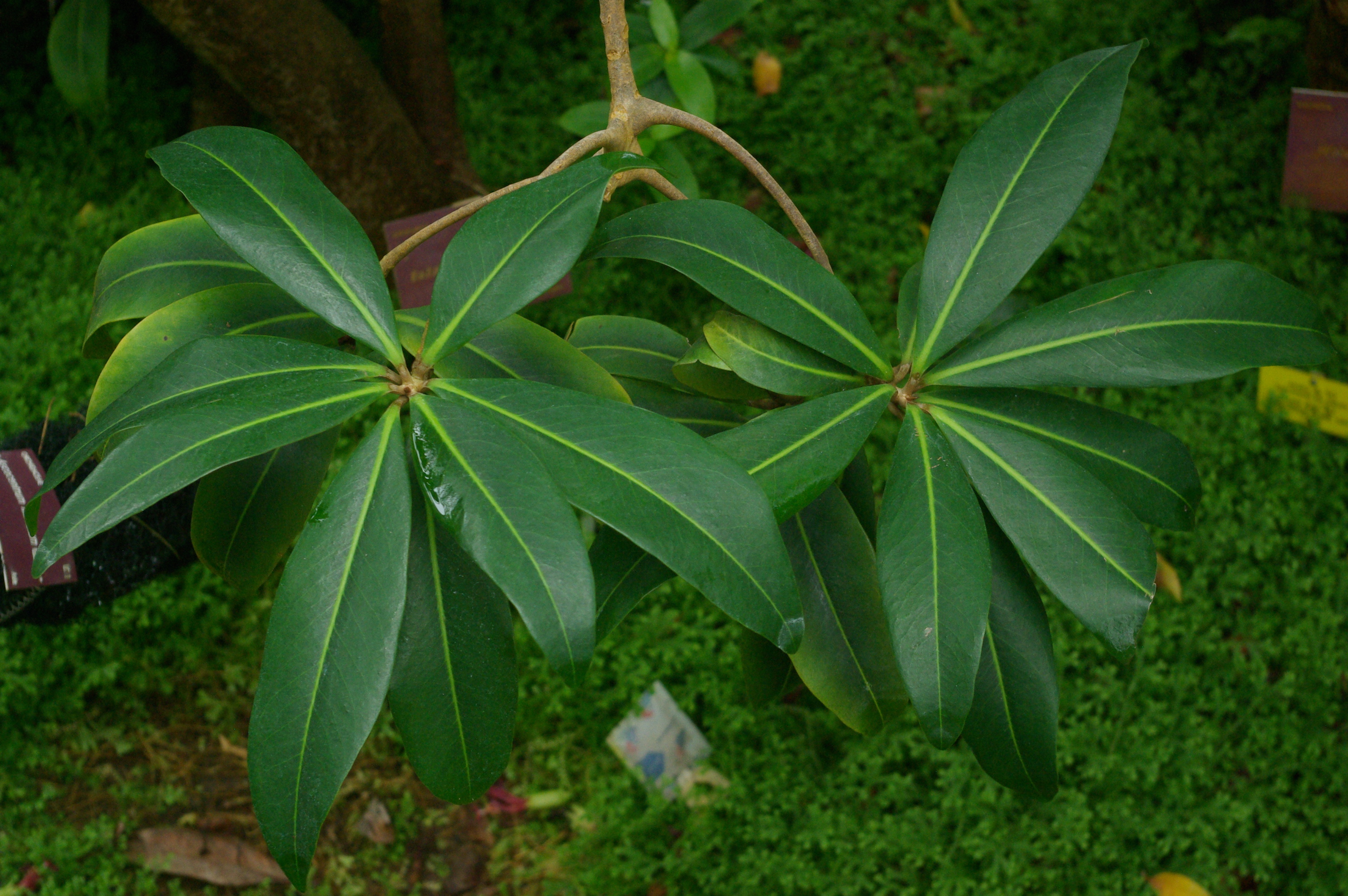
- Badula balfouriana

Scientific classification
- Kingdom: Plantae
- Clade: Tracheophytes
- Clade: Angiosperms
- Clade: Eudicots
- Clade: Asterids
- Order: Ericales
- Family: Primulaceae
- Subfamily: Myrsinoideae
- Genus: Badula; Juss.

Synonyms
- Stolidia Baill.

= Badula =

Genus of flowering plants

Badula is a small genus of 14–17 species of tropical shrubs, placed formerly in the plant family Myrsinaceae (now subsumed in Primulaceae as subfamily Myrsinoideae). The genus is largely endemic to Madagascar and the Mascarene Islands.

== Species ==
Mascarenes endemic species:

- Badula balfouriana (Kuntze) Mez
- Badula barthesia (Lam.) A.DC.
- Badula borbonica A.DC.
- Badula crassa A.DC.
- Badula decumbens (Cordem.) Coode
- Badula fragilis Bosser & Coode
- Badula grammisticta (Cordem.) Coode
- Badula multiflora A.DC.
- Badula nitida (Coode) Coode
- Badula ovalifolia A.DC.
- Badula platyphylla (A.DC.) Coode
- Badula reticulata A.DC.
- Badula richardiana H.Perrier

Madagascar endemic species:

- Badula leandriana H.Perrier
- Badula sieberi A.DC.
- Badula pervilleana H.Perrier

Non-endemic species:

- Badula insularis A.DC. – Mauritius and Vietnam

== Chemistry ==
Badula multiflora A.DC. has been found to possess antioxidant properties.
