= Mauritian Maroons =

Escaped African slaves in Mauritius

Mauritian maroons
Regions with significant populations
- Mauritius

Related ethnic groups
- Maroon peoples Black Seminoles, Bushinengue, Jamaican Maroons, Kalungas, Palenqueros, Quilombola

Mauritian maroons known as the 'Maroon Republic' were free people who escaped from enslavement in Mauritius. Predominantly of African & Malagasy origin, they are considered the first permanent population of Mauritius.

== History ==
Under governor Adriaan van der Stel in 1642, the early Dutch settlers of the Dutch East India Company brought 105 slaves from Madagascar and parts of Asia to work for them in Dutch Mauritius. However, 52 of these first slaves, including women, escaped into the wilderness of Dutch Mauritius. Only 18 of these escapees were caught. On 18 June 1695, a gang of maroons of Indonesian and Chinese origins, including Aaron d'Amboine, Antoni (Bamboes) and Paul de Batavia, as well as female escapees Anna du Bengale and Espérance, set fire to the Dutch settlers' Fort Frederick Hendryk (Vieux Grand Port) in an attempt to take over control of the island. They were all caught and decapitated. In February 1706 another revolt was organised by the remaining maroons as well as disgruntled slaves. When the Dutch abandoned Dutch Mauritius in 1710 the maroons stayed behind.

When representatives of the French East India Company landed on the island in 1715 they also had to face attacks by the Mauritian maroons. Significant events were the 1724 assault on a military outpost in the Savannah district, as well as the attack on a military barrack in 1732 at Poste de Flacq. Several deaths resulted from such attacks. Soon after his arrival in 1735, Mahé de La Bourdonnais assembled and equipped French militia groups, made up of both civilians and soldiers, to fight against the maroons. In 1739, maroon leader Sans Souci was captured near Flacq and was burnt alive by the French settlers. A few years later, a group of French settlers gave chase to Barbe Blanche, another maroon leader, but lost track of him at Le Morne. Other maroons included Diamamouve and Madame Françoise.

== Modern era ==
In 2008, Le Morne Brabant, a peninsula at the extreme southwestern tip of Mauritius where Maroons established small communities in the 19th century, was listed as a UNESCO Heritage Site. It represents a symbol of resistance to slavery. In 2009, a monument was unveiled on the island that included an inscription of this extract from the poem "Le Morne Territoire Marron" by Richard Sedley Assonne: "There were hundreds of them, but my people, the maroons, chose the kiss of death over the chains of slavery. Never must we forget their noble deeds, written in the pages of stories for the sake of humanity...". The poem is referring to the legend that many maroons committed suicide when British soldiers arrived to Le Morne Brabant to announce the abolition of slavery. Maroons thought they had been sent to arrest and re-enslave them. In 2008, a Truth and Justice Commission on the legacy of Slavery and Indentured Labour was created, conducting a state-led inquiry in the history of slaves and their descendants and formulating recommendations on reparations.

== See also ==
- Maroons
