= Caldwellia =

Scientific classification
- Kingdom: Animalia
- Phylum: Mollusca
- Class: Gastropoda
- Order: Stylommatophora
- Family: Euconulidae
- Genus: Caldwellia; H. Adams, 1873

Genus of gastropods

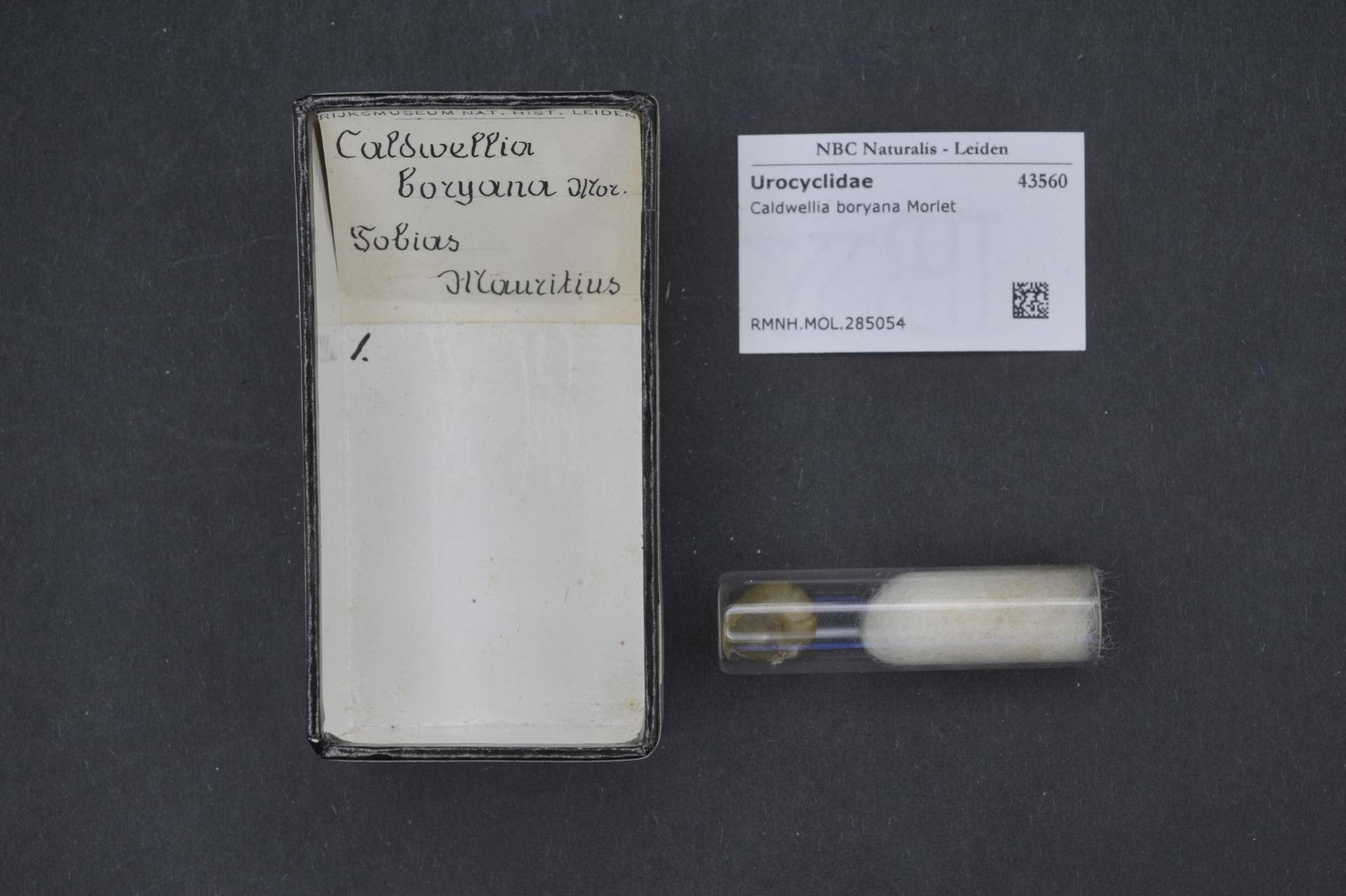
Vial containing Caldwellia boryana shell

Caldwellia is a genus of minute, air-breathing land snails, terrestrial pulmonate gastropod mollusks or micromollusks in the family Euconulidae, the hive snails.

== Species ==
Species within the genus Caldwellia include:

- Caldwellia imperfecta
- Caldwellia philyrina
