= William Jacobsen =

William or Will Jacobsen, or William or Will Jacobson may refer to:

== Jacobsen ==
- Will Jacobsen (born 1988), American basketball player
- William L. Jacobsen, American ambassador to Guinea-Bissau
- William S. Jacobsen, U.S. representative from Iowa

== Jacobson ==
- William Jacobson (1803–1884), English professor of divinity and bishop of Chester
- William A. Jacobson, American lawyer, clinical professor and conservative blogger
- Baby Doll Jacobson (William Chester Jacobson, 1890–1977), American baseball outfielder

== See also ==
- Bill Jacobsen (disambiguation)
