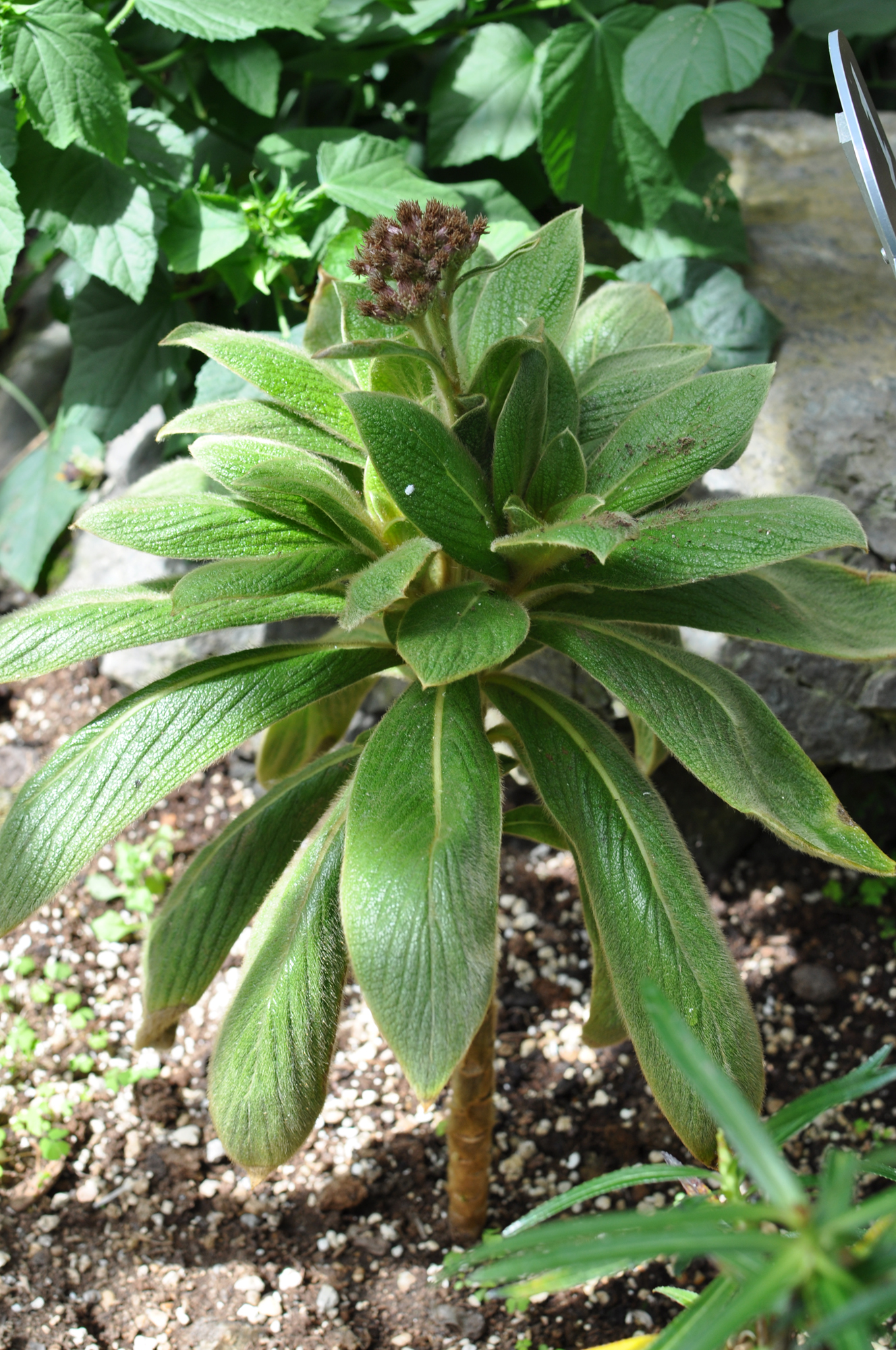
- Cylindrocline lorencei

Scientific classification
- Kingdom: Plantae
- Clade: Tracheophytes
- Clade: Angiosperms
- Clade: Eudicots
- Clade: Asterids
- Order: Asterales
- Family: Asteraceae
- Subfamily: Asteroideae
- Tribe: Inuleae
- Genus: Cylindrocline; Cass.

= Cylindrocline =

Genus of flowering plants

Cylindrocline is a genus of flowering plant in the family Asteraceae.

It contains two species, both endemic to the Island of Mauritius in the Indian Ocean.

- Cylindrocline commersonii Cass.
- Cylindrocline lorencei A.J.Scott
