= Index of Africa-related articles =

This is an index of articles related to Africa, by country:

1. Index of Algeria-related articles
2. Index of Angola-related articles
3. Index of Benin-related articles
4. Index of Botswana-related articles
5. Index of Burkina Faso-related articles
6. Index of Burundi-related articles
7. Index of Cameroon-related articles
8. Index of Cape Verde–related articles
9. Index of Central African Republic-related articles
10. Index of Chad-related articles
11. Index of Comoros-related articles
12. Index of Democratic Republic of the Congo-related articles
13. Index of Republic of the Congo–related articles
14. Index of Djibouti-related articles
15. Index of Egypt-related articles
16. Index of Equatorial Guinea–related articles
17. Index of Eritrea-related articles
18. Index of Ethiopia-related articles
19. Index of Gabon-related articles
20. Index of Gambia-related articles
21. Index of Ghana-related articles
22. Index of Guinea-related articles
23. Index of Guinea-Bissau-related articles
24. Index of Ivory Coast-related articles
25. Index of Kenya-related articles
26. Index of Lesotho-related articles
27. Index of Liberia-related articles
28. Index of Libya-related articles
29. Index of Madagascar-related articles
30. Index of Mali-related articles
31. Index of Mauritania-related articles
32. Index of Mauritius-related articles
33. Index of Mayotte-related articles
34. Index of Morocco-related articles
35. Index of Mozambique-related articles
36. Index of Namibia-related articles
37. Index of Niger-related articles
38. Index of Nigeria-related articles
39. Index of Réunion-related articles
40. Index of Rwanda-related articles
41. Index of Saint Helena-related articles
42. Index of São Tomé and Príncipe-related articles
43. Index of Senegal-related articles
44. Index of Seychelles-related articles
45. Index of Somalia-related articles
46. Index of South Africa-related articles
47. Index of Sudan-related articles
48. Index of Tanzania-related articles
49. Index of Tunisia-related articles
50. Index of Uganda-related articles
51. Index of Western Sahara-related articles
52. Index of Zambia-related articles
53. Index of Zimbabwe-related articles

== See also ==
- Lists of country-related topics
- Outline of Africa
