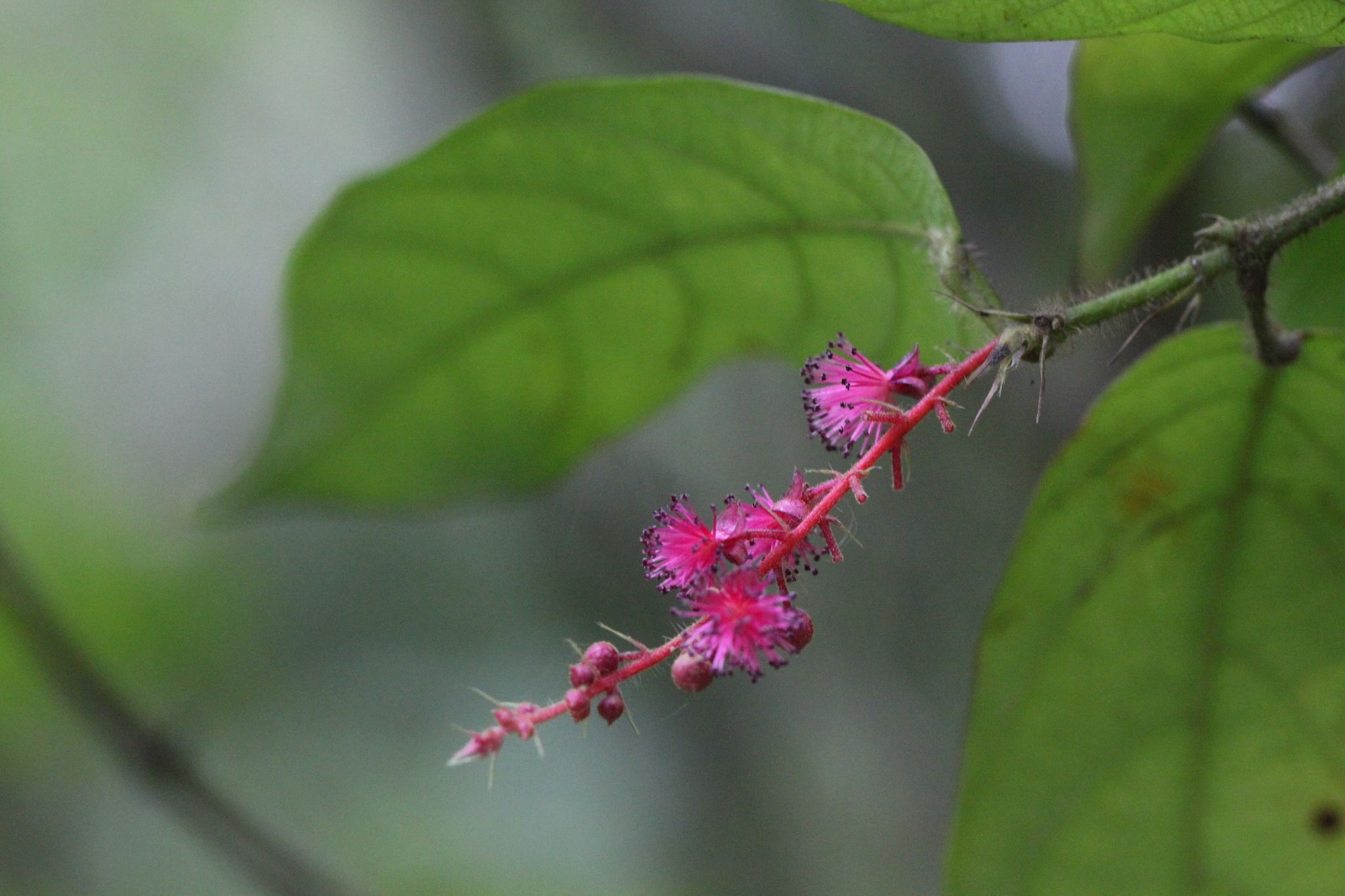
- Hancea hookeriana in Hong Kong

Scientific classification
- Kingdom: Plantae
- Clade: Tracheophytes
- Clade: Angiosperms
- Clade: Eudicots
- Clade: Rosids
- Order: Malpighiales
- Family: Euphorbiaceae
- Subfamily: Acalyphoideae
- Tribe: Acalypheae
- Subtribe: Rottlerinae
- Genus: Hancea; Seem.

Species
- See text

Synonyms
- Cordemoya Baill.; Deuteromallotus Pax & K.Hoffm.; Diplochlamys Müll.Arg.

= Hancea =

Genus of flowering plants

Hancea is a genus of plants in the family Euphorbiaceae, native to tropical Asia and the western Indian Ocean.

== Species ==
As of August 2024, Plants of the World Online accepted the following species:

- Hancea acuminata (Baill.) S.E.C.Sierra, Kulju & Welzen
- Hancea capuronii (Leandri) S.E.C.Sierra, Kulju & Welzen
- Hancea cordatifolia (Slik) S.E.C.Sierra, Kulju & Welzen
- Hancea eucausta (Airy Shaw) S.E.C.Sierra, Kulju & Welzen
- Hancea grandistipularis (Slik) S.E.C.Sierra, Kulju & Welzen
- Hancea griffithiana (Müll.Arg.) S.E.C.Sierra, Kulju & Welzen
- Hancea hirsuta (Elmer) S.E.C.Sierra, Kulju & Welzen
- Hancea hookeriana Seem.
- Hancea inhospita McPherson
- Hancea integrifolia (Willd.) S.E.C.Sierra, Kulju & Welzen
- Hancea kingii (Hook.f.) S.E.C.Sierra, Kulju & Welzen
- Hancea longistyla (Merr.) S.E.C.Sierra, Kulju & Welzen
- Hancea papuana (J.J.Sm.) S.E.C.Sierra, Kulju & Welzen
- Hancea penangensis (Müll.Arg.) S.E.C.Sierra, Kulju & Welzen
- Hancea spinulosa (McPherson) S.E.C.Sierra, Kulju & Welzen
- Hancea stipularis (Airy Shaw) S.E.C.Sierra, Kulju & Welzen
- Hancea subpeltata (Blume) M.Aparicio ex S.E.C.Sierra, Kulju & Welzen
- Hancea wenzeliana (Slik) S.E.C.Sierra, Kulju & Welzen

== See also ==
- Mallotus (plant)
