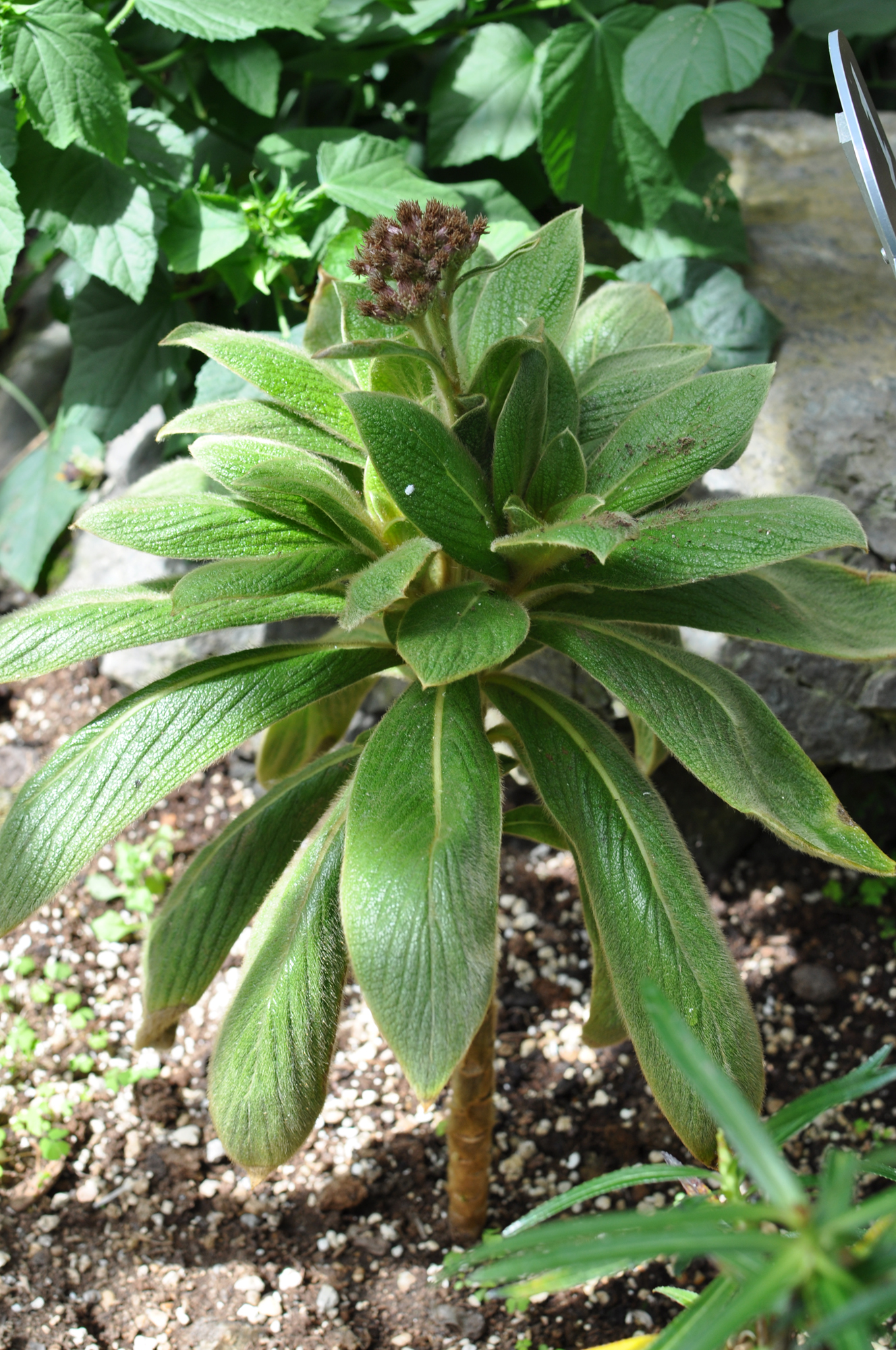

Scientific classification
- Kingdom: Plantae
- Clade: Tracheophytes
- Clade: Angiosperms
- Clade: Eudicots
- Clade: Asterids
- Order: Asterales
- Family: Asteraceae
- Genus: Cylindrocline
- Species: C. lorencei

Binomial name
- Cylindrocline lorencei A.J.Scott

= Cylindrocline lorencei =

Species of flowering plant

Cylindrocline lorencei is a small tree that was native to the island of Mauritius, with only one specimen ever observed in the wild. By 1990 the species was considered extinct, and the only available seed could not be germinated. Brest Botanic Gardens successfully performed in vitro culture of a viable part of the seed embryo, saving the plant from extinction. Through further vegetative propagation at Brest and Kew Botanic Gardens, a small population of Cylindrocline lorencei has been grown and efforts are now underway to re-establish it in its native habitat.

== Description ==
Cylindrocline lorencei is a small tree growing up to 2 m (6.6 ft) high, with branches in the upper part that are densely covered in leaves in terminal rosettes. Leaves are olive-green colored with yellow-green veins, grow in spirals, and are attached directly to the stem or with a very short petiole. The oblanceolate shaped leaf is 12 to 18 cm (4.7 to 7.1 in) long and 4.5 to 5.5 cm (1.8 to 2.2 in) wide, with fine hairs on the upper surface and heavily covered with fine hairs underneath.

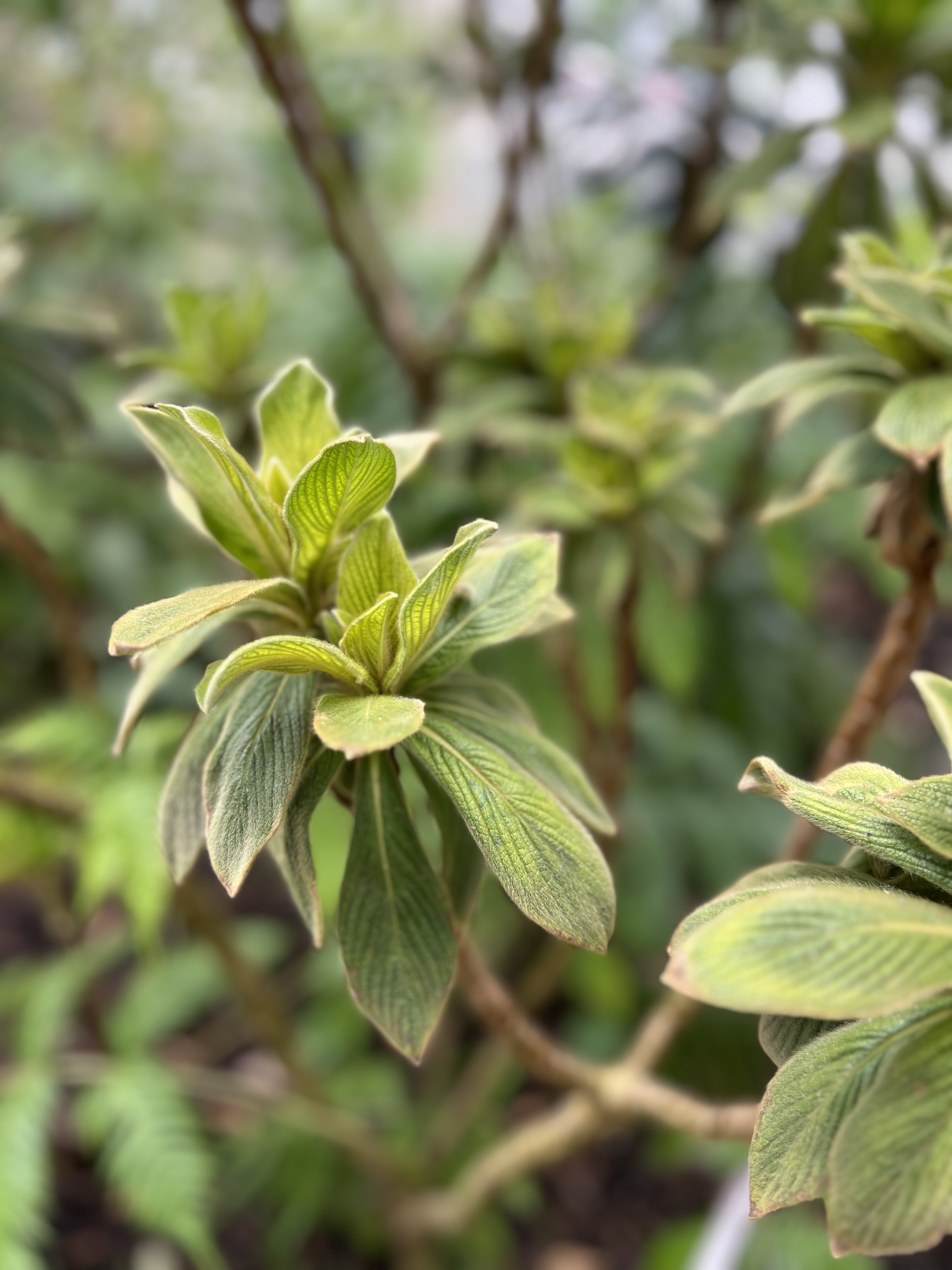
Leaves with fine hairs

== Distribution and habitat ==
The original specimen of Cylindrocline lorencei grew at 700 m (2,300 ft) elevation in Black River Gorges National Park in a region called the Plaine Champagne. The habitat is lower elevation ericoid shrubland, and the plant was found growing along with Helichrysum, in laterite soil.

== Conservation ==
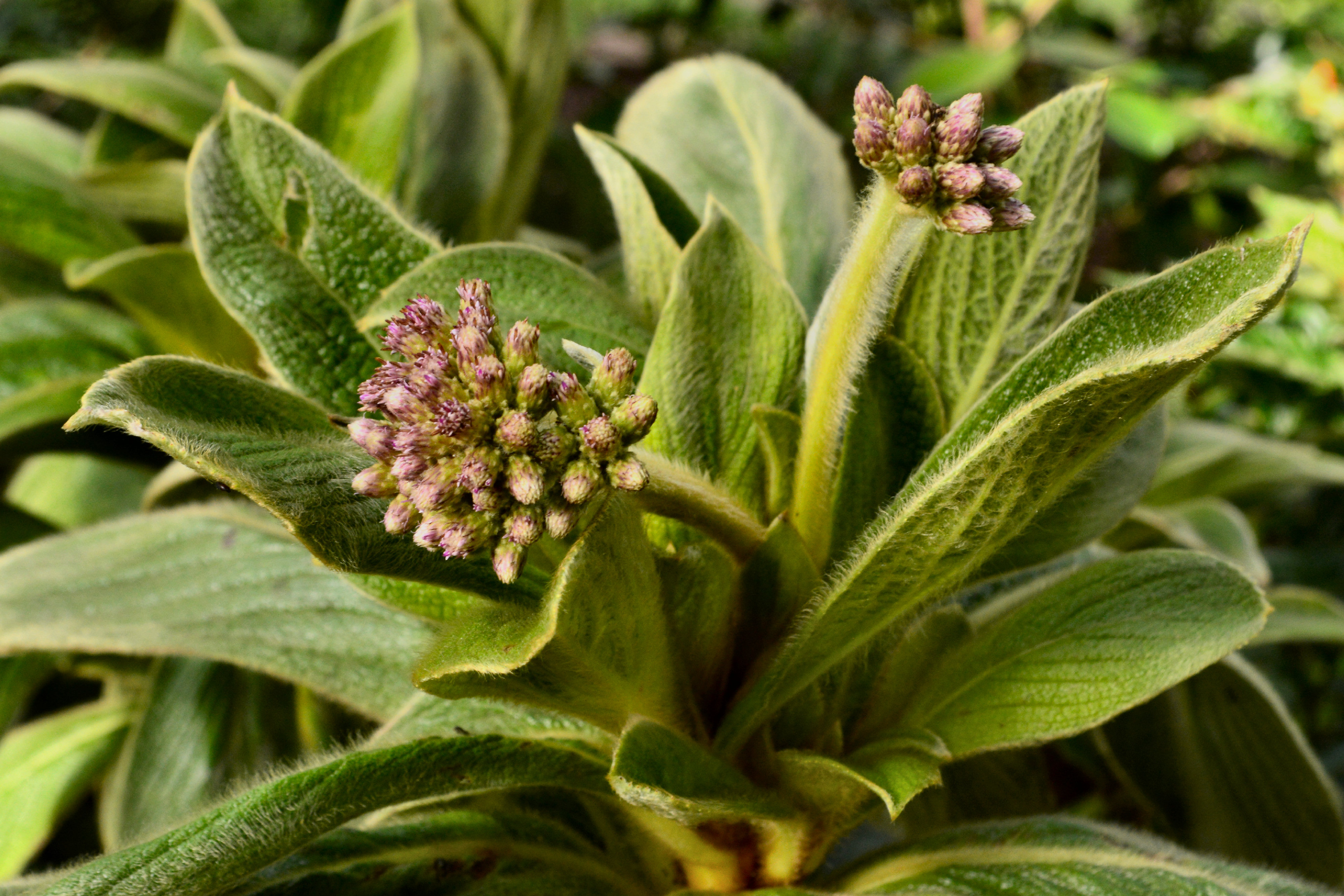
Inflorescence

The material for the type specimen was collected in 1973 by botanist David H. Lorence, who observed only one plant in the Plaine Champagne area. Fruit collected in 1980 confirmed the survival of the plant up to that time. Due to the death of that plant, the species was considered to be extinct in the wild as of 1990, even though the IUCN Red List for 1997 still classified it as Endangered—probably because they were unaware of the death of the single plant.

Several plants have been propagated and are growing at the Native Plant Propagation Centre at Curepipe in Mauritius. If those plants survive, attempts will be made to reestablish the plant in its native habitat in Black River Gorges National Park. Brest Botanic Gardens and Kew Botanic Gardens also continue to grow populations of the plant.

In June 2024, after following a precise protocol, around a hundred plants were reintroduced into the wild in the conservation areas of Mauritius.

== Etymology ==
Named after David H. Lorence.
