= Bill Jacobson =

American photographer

Song on Sentient Beings, gelatin silver print by Bill Jacobson, 1995

New Year’s Day, chromogenic print by Bill Jacobson, 2003

Bill Jacobson (b. Norwich, Connecticut, 1955) is an American photographer. He received a BFA from Brown University in 1977 and an MFA from the San Francisco Art Institute in 1981.

== Works ==
Jacobson began making out of focus images in 1989. After exhibiting in a number of group exhibitions, in 1993 he had his first New York solo show at New York University’s Grey Art Gallery. Entitled Interim Figures, these shadowy pale photographs are intended to evoke the loss experienced by so many during the height of the AIDS epidemic and the futility of capturing true human likeness in both portraiture and memory.

Jacobson’s subsequent Song of Sentient Beings (1994-1995) continues his interest in the defocused figure. In contrast to the bleached luminosity of his prior work, these images depict deep black backgrounds enveloping ghostly figures which bend, sleep, stretch and howl. His next body of work, Thought Series (1996-1998) is a nearly monochromatic deep-black evocation of the flow of life. Photographing a broad spectrum of subjects from tightly cropped faces to fields of grass and surfaces of water, Jacobson links the human figure to nature, suggesting their connections. bill jacobson 1989-1997, published by Twin Palms in 1998, is a survey of work from this nine year period. Song on Sentient Beings demonstrates these monochromatic defocused figures.

Influenced by a trip to India in 1999, Jacobson retained the out of focus but shifted to color, photographing both urban and rural landscapes in Untitled (1999-2001) and New Year’s Day (2002-2003). The work parallels an inner journey through a world we are constantly experiencing with the uncertainty of the mind’s eye rather than the sharp clarity of a camera lens. A monograph of this work, simply called "Photographs", was published by Hatje Cantz in 2005 and includes an extensive essay by the noted photographic historian Eugenia Parry. New Year’s Day is an example of his defocused urban landscapes employing color.

Since 2003 he has worked with a variety of themes, in color and in focus. Jacobson's third monograph, A Series of Human Decisions, includes work from 2005 to 2009, as well as an interview between the artist and Ian Berry, curator at the Tang Museum. This series depicts a wide range of intimate, focused places from the real world, emphasizing the complexities of spaces and objects that people both create and encounter on a daily basis. The geometry found in these man-made places is echoed in Some Planes, a series of desert landscapes from 2007 to 2008.

The Blanton Museum of Art (Austin, TX), the Brooklyn Museum, the Corcoran Gallery of Art (Washington, DC), the Hammer Museum (Los Angeles, CA), the Honolulu Museum of Art, the International Center of Photography (New York City), the Metropolitan Museum of Art, the Montgomery Museum of Fine Arts (Montgomery, AL), the Museum of Contemporary Photography (Chicago, IL), the Museum of Fine Arts, Boston, the Museum of Fine Arts, Houston, the Nelson-Atkins Museum of Art (Kansas City, MO), New Orleans Museum of Art, the North Carolina Museum of Art (Raleigh, NC), the Palm Springs Art Museum (Palm Springs, CA), the Palmer Museum of Art (Pennsylvania State University, State College, PA), Princeton University Art Museum, the San Francisco Museum of Modern Art, the Solomon R. Guggenheim Museum (New York City), the Spencer Museum of Art (Lawrence, KS)], the Saint Louis Art Museum (St. Louis, MO), the Tampa Museum of Art (Tampa, FL), the University of Michigan Museum of Art (Ann Arbor, MI), the Victoria and Albert Museum, the Worcester Art Museum (Worcester, MA), and the Whitney Museum of American Art (New York City) are among the public collections holding work by Bill Jacobson
