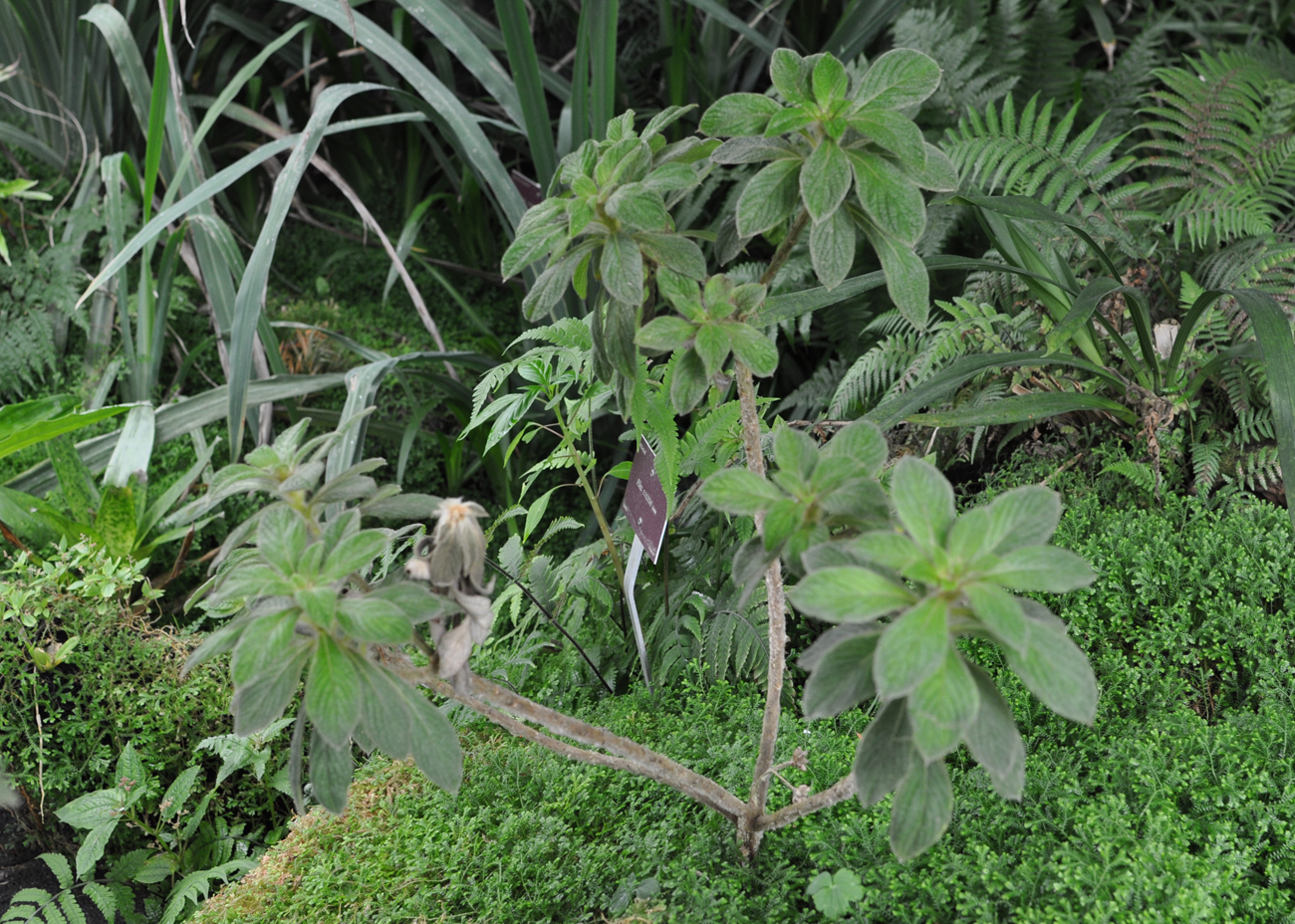

Conservation status
- Critically Endangered (IUCN 2.3)

Scientific classification
- Kingdom: Plantae
- Clade: Tracheophytes
- Clade: Angiosperms
- Clade: Eudicots
- Clade: Asterids
- Order: Asterales
- Family: Asteraceae
- Genus: Cylindrocline
- Species: C. commersonii

Binomial name
- Cylindrocline commersonii Cass.

= Cylindrocline commersonii =

Species of flowering plant

Cylindrocline commersonii is a species of flowering plant in the family Asteraceae, named after Philibert Commerson. It is found only in Mauritius. Its natural habitat is subtropical or tropical dry forests.
