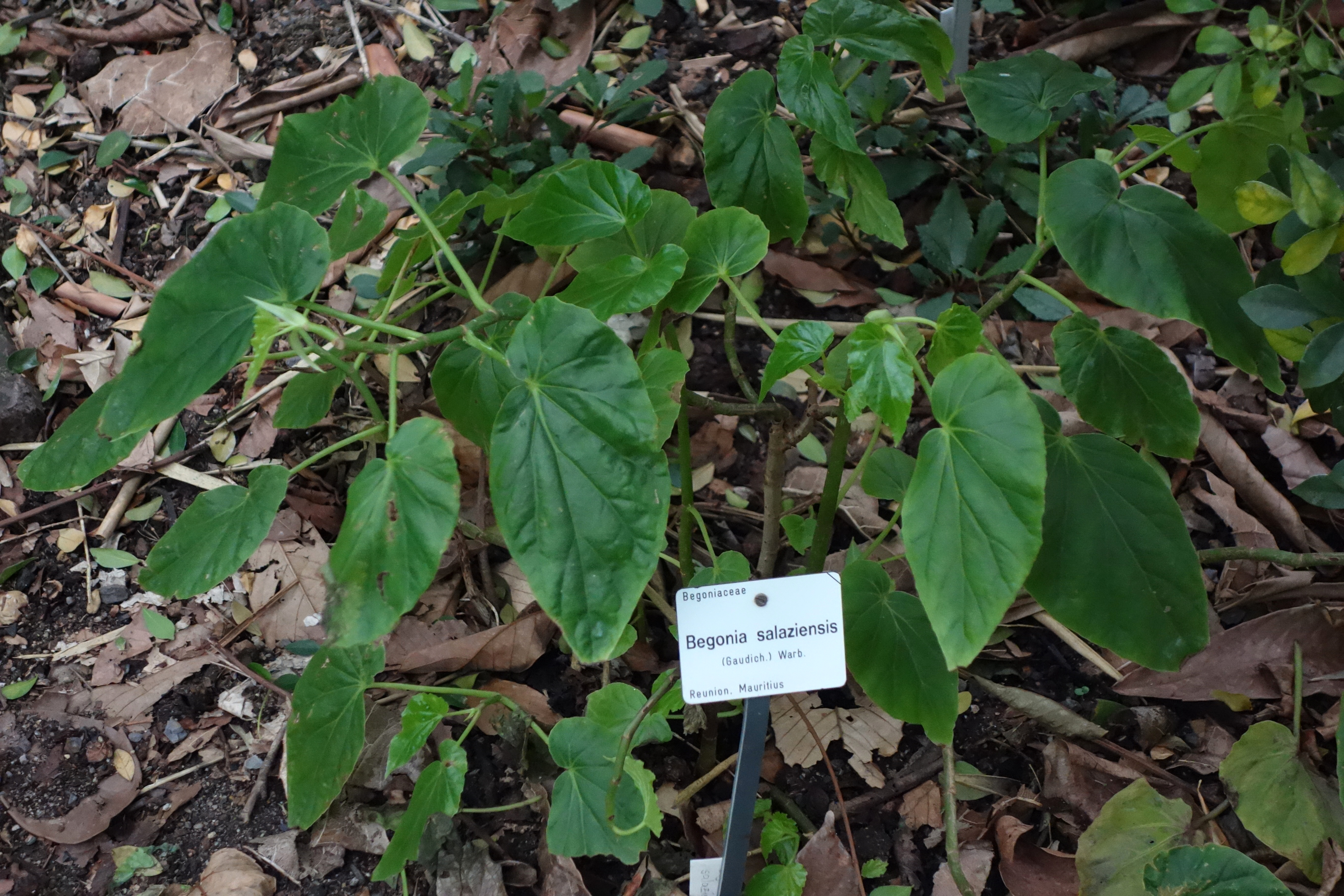

Conservation status
- Critically Endangered (IUCN 2.3)

Scientific classification
- Kingdom: Plantae
- Clade: Tracheophytes
- Clade: Angiosperms
- Clade: Eudicots
- Clade: Rosids
- Order: Cucurbitales
- Family: Begoniaceae
- Genus: Begonia
- Species: B. salaziensis

Binomial name
- Begonia salaziensis Warb.

= Begonia salaziensis =

Species of flowering plant

Begonia salaziensis is a species of plant in the family Begoniaceae. It is endemic to Mauritius, where there are fewer than 50 individual plants growing. Its natural habitat is subtropical or tropical dry forests.
