= Caldwellia philyrina =

Conservation status
- Extinct (IUCN 2.3)

Scientific classification
- Kingdom: Animalia
- Phylum: Mollusca
- Class: Gastropoda
- Order: Stylommatophora
- Family: Euconulidae
- Genus: Caldwellia
- Species: †C. philyrina

Binomial name
- †Caldwellia philyrina Morelet, 1851

Species of gastropod

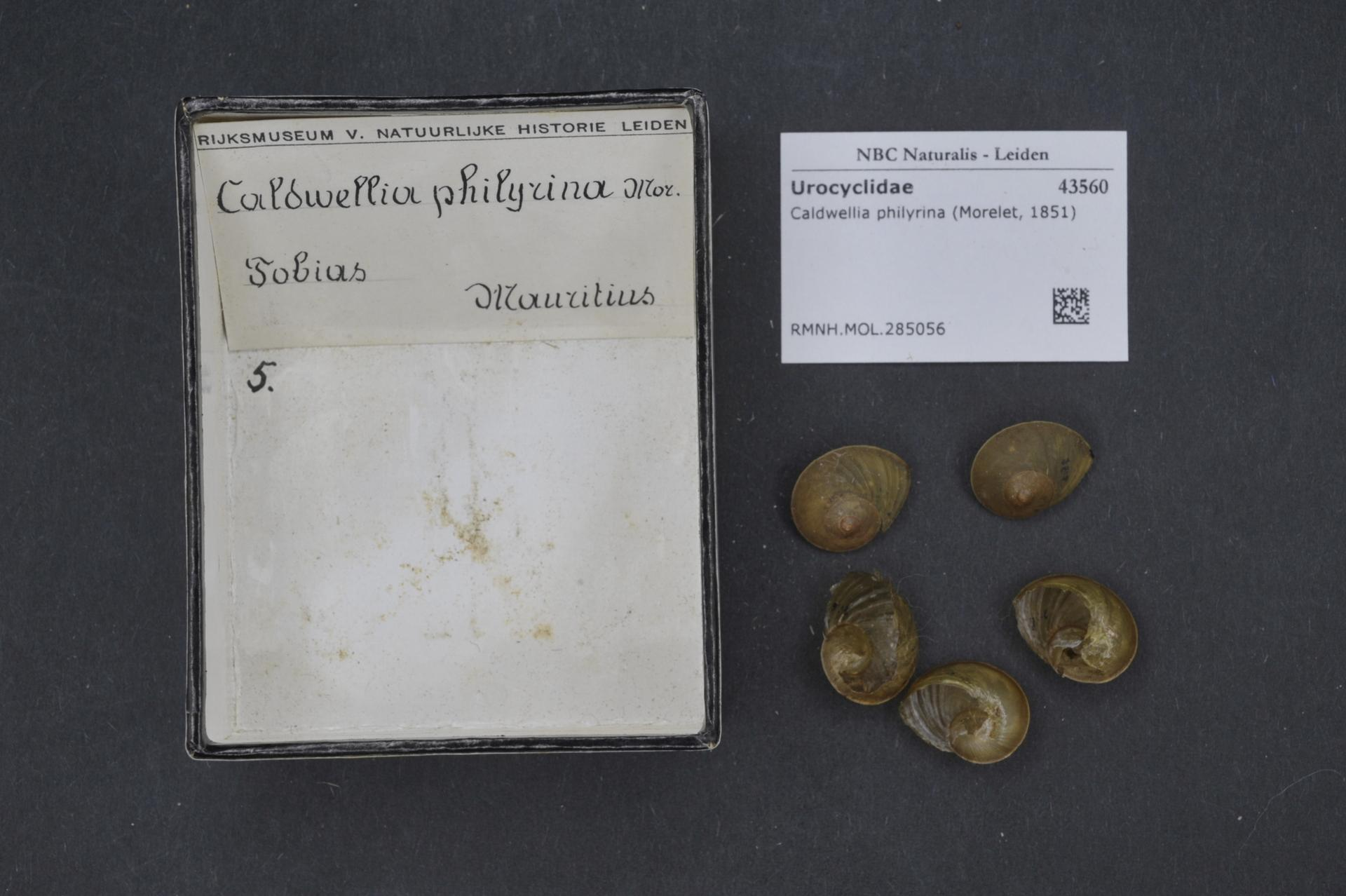
Caldwellia philyrina (Morelet, 1851).

Caldwellia philyrina was a species of minute, air-breathing land snails, terrestrial pulmonate gastropod mollusks or micromollusks in the family Euconulidae, the hive snails. This species was endemic to Mauritius.
