= Didier Gopaul =

Mauritian footballer

Personal information
- Full name: Didier Gopaul
- Date of birth: October 8, 1983 (age 43)
- Place of birth: Mauritius
- Position: Goalkeeper

Team information
- Current team: Étoile de l'Ouest Bambous

Senior career*
Years	Team	Apps	(Gls)
2007–	Étoile de l'Ouest Bambous	-	(-)

International career
2008–	Mauritius	4	(0)
- * Club domestic league appearances and goals

Didier Gopaul (born October 8, 1983) is a Mauritian football player who currently plays for Étoile de l'Ouest Bambous in the Mauritian Premier League and for the Mauritius national football team as a goalkeeper. He is featured on the Mauritian national team in the official 2010 FIFA World Cup video game.
