= List of Cathay Pacific destinations =

As of May 2026, Cathay Pacific serves 82 destinations, including seasonal and cargo services, in 30 countries across Asia, Europe, North America and Oceania.

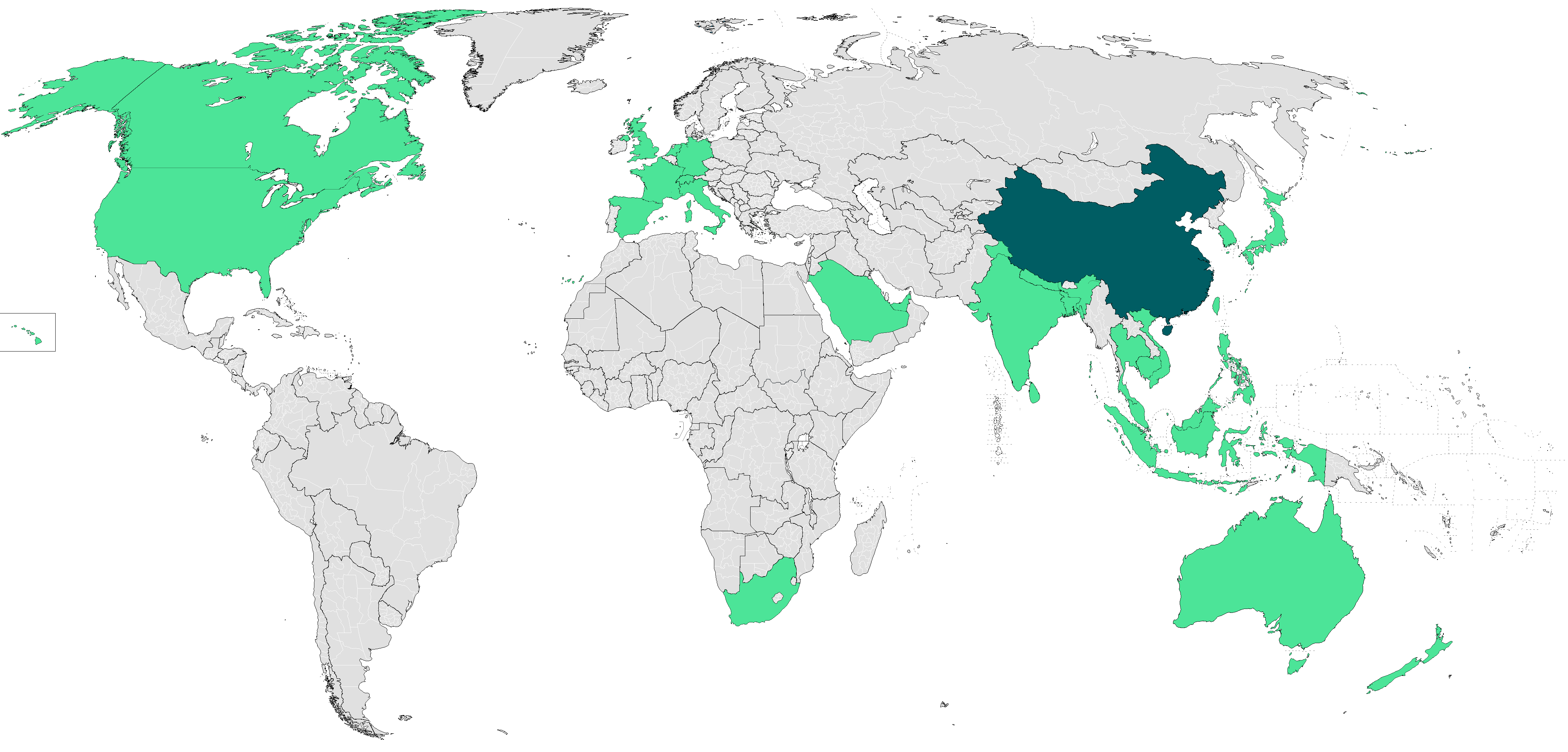
Countries served by Cathay Pacific

== List ==
Country/region	City	Airport	Notes	Refs
Australia	Adelaide	Adelaide Airport	Seasonal	
Australia	Brisbane	Brisbane Airport	Passenger + cargo	
Australia	Cairns	Cairns Airport	Seasonal	
Australia	Hobart	Hobart Airport	Seasonal cargo	
Australia	Melbourne	Melbourne Airport	Passenger + cargo	
Australia	Perth	Perth Airport	Passenger	
Australia	Sydney	Sydney Airport	Passenger + cargo	
Australia	Toowoomba	Toowoomba Wellcamp Airport	Terminated	
Bahrain	Manama	Bahrain International Airport	Terminated	
Bangladesh	Dhaka	Hazrat Shahjalal International Airport	Passenger + cargo	
Belgium	Brussels	Brussels Airport	Passenger	
Cambodia	Phnom Penh	Phnom Penh International Airport	Airport Closed	
Cambodia	Phnom Penh	Techo International Airport	Passenger + cargo	
Canada	Calgary	Calgary International Airport	Terminated	
Canada	Toronto	Toronto Pearson International Airport	Passenger + cargo	
Canada	Vancouver	Vancouver International Airport	Passenger	
China	Beijing	Beijing Capital International Airport	Passenger	
China	Changsha	Changsha Huanghua International Airport	Passenger + Cargo	
China	Chengdu	Chengdu Shuangliu International Airport	Passenger + Cargo	
China	Chengdu	Chengdu Tianfu International Airport	Terminated	
China	Chongqing	Chongqing Jiangbei International Airport	Passenger + cargo	
China	Fuzhou	Fuzhou Changle International Airport	Passenger	
China	Guangzhou	Guangzhou Baiyun International Airport	Passenger	
China	Haikou	Haikou Meilan International Airport	Passenger	
China	Hangzhou	Hangzhou Xiaoshan International Airport	Passenger	
China	Nanjing	Nanjing Lukou International Airport	Passenger	
China	Ningbo	Ningbo Lishe International Airport	Passenger	
China	Qingdao	Qingdao Jiaodong International Airport	Passenger	
China	Qingdao	Qingdao Liuting International Airport	Airport closed	
China	Sanya	Sanya Phoenix International Airport	Terminated	
China	Shanghai	Shanghai Hongqiao International Airport	Passenger	
China	Shanghai	Shanghai Pudong International Airport	Passenger + cargo	
China	Ürümqi	Ürümqi Tianshan International Airport	Passenger	
China	Wenzhou	Wenzhou Yongqiang International Airport	Passenger	
China	Wuhan	Wuhan Tianhe International Airport	Passenger	
China	Xiamen	Xiamen Gaoqi International Airport	Passenger + cargo	
China	Xi'an	Xi'an Xianyang International Airport	Passenger	
China	Zhengzhou	Zhengzhou Xinzheng International Airport	Passenger + cargo	
Denmark	Copenhagen	Copenhagen Airport	Terminated	
France	Paris	Charles de Gaulle Airport	Passenger + cargo	
Germany	Düsseldorf	Düsseldorf Airport	Terminated	
Germany	Frankfurt	Frankfurt Airport	Passenger + cargo	
Germany	Munich	Munich Airport	Passenger	
Hong Kong	Hong Kong	Hong Kong International Airport	Hub	
Hong Kong	Hong Kong	Kai Tak Airport	Airport closed	
India	Bengaluru	Kempegowda International Airport	Passenger	
India	Chennai	Chennai International Airport	Passenger + cargo	
India	Delhi	Indira Gandhi International Airport	Passenger + cargo	
India	Hyderabad	Rajiv Gandhi International Airport	Passenger	
India	Kolkata	Netaji Subhas Chandra Bose International Airport	Terminated	
India	Mumbai	Chhatrapati Shivaji Maharaj International Airport	Passenger + cargo	
Indonesia	Denpasar	Ngurah Rai International Airport	Passenger	
Indonesia	Jakarta	Soekarno–Hatta International Airport	Passenger + cargo	
Indonesia	Surabaya	Juanda International Airport	Passenger	
Ireland	Dublin	Dublin Airport	Terminated	
Israel	Tel Aviv	Ben Gurion Airport	Suspended	
Italy	Milan	Milan Malpensa Airport	Passenger + cargo	
Italy	Rome	Rome Fiumicino Airport	Seasonal	
Japan	Fukuoka	Fukuoka Airport	Passenger	
Japan	Komatsu	Komatsu Airport	Terminated	
Japan	Nagoya	Chubu Centrair International Airport	Passenger	
Japan	Osaka	Kansai International Airport	Passenger + cargo	
Japan	Sapporo	New Chitose Airport	Passenger	
Japan	Tokyo	Haneda Airport	Passenger	
Japan	Tokyo	Narita International Airport	Passenger + cargo	
Kazakhstan	Almaty	Almaty International Airport	Begins 9 January 2027	
Kazakhstan	Astana	Nursultan Nazarbayev International Airport	Cargo	
Malaysia	Kuala Lumpur	Kuala Lumpur International Airport	Passenger	
Malaysia	Penang	Penang International Airport	Passenger + cargo	
Maldives	Malé	Velana International Airport	Terminated	
Mexico	Guadalajara	Guadalajara International Airport	Cargo	
Mexico	Mexico City	Mexico City International Airport	Terminated	
Mexico	Mexico City	Felipe Ángeles International Airport	Cargo	
Nepal	Kathmandu	Tribhuvan International Airport	Passenger	
Netherlands	Amsterdam	Amsterdam Airport Schiphol	Passenger + cargo	
New Zealand	Auckland	Auckland Airport	Passenger	
New Zealand	Christchurch	Christchurch Airport	Seasonal	
Pakistan	Karachi	Jinnah International Airport	Terminated	
Philippines	Cebu	Mactan–Cebu International Airport	Passenger	
Philippines	Manila	Ninoy Aquino International Airport	Passenger	
Qatar	Doha	Hamad International Airport	Terminated	
Russia	Moscow	Moscow Domodedovo Airport	Terminated	
Saudi Arabia	Jeddah	King Abdulaziz International Airport	Terminated	
Saudi Arabia	Riyadh	King Khalid International Airport	Suspended	
Singapore	Singapore	Changi Airport	Passenger + cargo	
South Africa	Cape Town	Cape Town International Airport	Terminated	
South Africa	Johannesburg	O. R. Tambo International Airport	Passenger	
South Korea	Seoul	Gimpo International Airport	Terminated	
South Korea	Seoul	Incheon International Airport	Passenger + cargo	
Spain	Barcelona	Josep Tarradellas Barcelona–El Prat Airport	Passenger	
Spain	Madrid	Adolfo Suárez Madrid–Barajas Airport	Passenger	
Sri Lanka	Colombo	Bandaranaike International Airport	Passenger + cargo	
Switzerland	Zurich	Zurich Airport	Passenger	
Taiwan	Kaohsiung	Kaohsiung International Airport	Passenger	
Taiwan	Taipei	Taoyuan International Airport	Passenger + cargo	
Thailand	Bangkok	Don Mueang International Airport	Terminated	
Thailand	Bangkok	Suvarnabhumi Airport	Passenger	
Thailand	Phuket	Phuket International Airport	Passenger	
Turkey	Istanbul	Atatürk Airport	Airport closed	
United Arab Emirates	Abu Dhabi	Zayed International Airport	Terminated	
United Arab Emirates	Dubai	Al Maktoum International Airport	Suspended	
United Arab Emirates	Dubai	Dubai International Airport	Suspended	
United Kingdom	London	Gatwick Airport	Terminated	
United Kingdom	London	Heathrow Airport	Passenger + cargo	
United Kingdom	Manchester	Manchester Airport	Passenger	
United States	Anchorage	Ted Stevens Anchorage International Airport	Cargo	
United States	Atlanta	Hartsfield–Jackson Atlanta International Airport	Cargo	
United States	Boston	Logan International Airport	Passenger	
United States	Chicago	O'Hare International Airport	Passenger + cargo	
United States	Columbus	Rickenbacker International Airport	Terminated	
United States	Dallas	Dallas Fort Worth International Airport	Passenger + cargo	
United States	Houston	George Bush Intercontinental Airport	Cargo	
United States	Los Angeles	Los Angeles International Airport	Passenger + cargo	
United States	Miami	Miami International Airport	Cargo	
United States	New York City	John F. Kennedy International Airport	Passenger + cargo	
United States	Newark	Newark Liberty International Airport	Terminated	
United States	Portland, OR	Portland International Airport	Cargo	
United States	San Francisco	San Francisco International Airport	Passenger	
United States	Seattle	Seattle–Tacoma International Airport	Passenger	
United States	Washington, D.C.	Dulles International Airport	Terminated	
Vietnam	Hanoi	Noi Bai International Airport	Passenger + cargo	
Vietnam	Ho Chi Minh City	Tan Son Nhat International Airport	Passenger + cargo	

== See also ==
- List of Cathay Dragon destinations
- HK Express destinations
