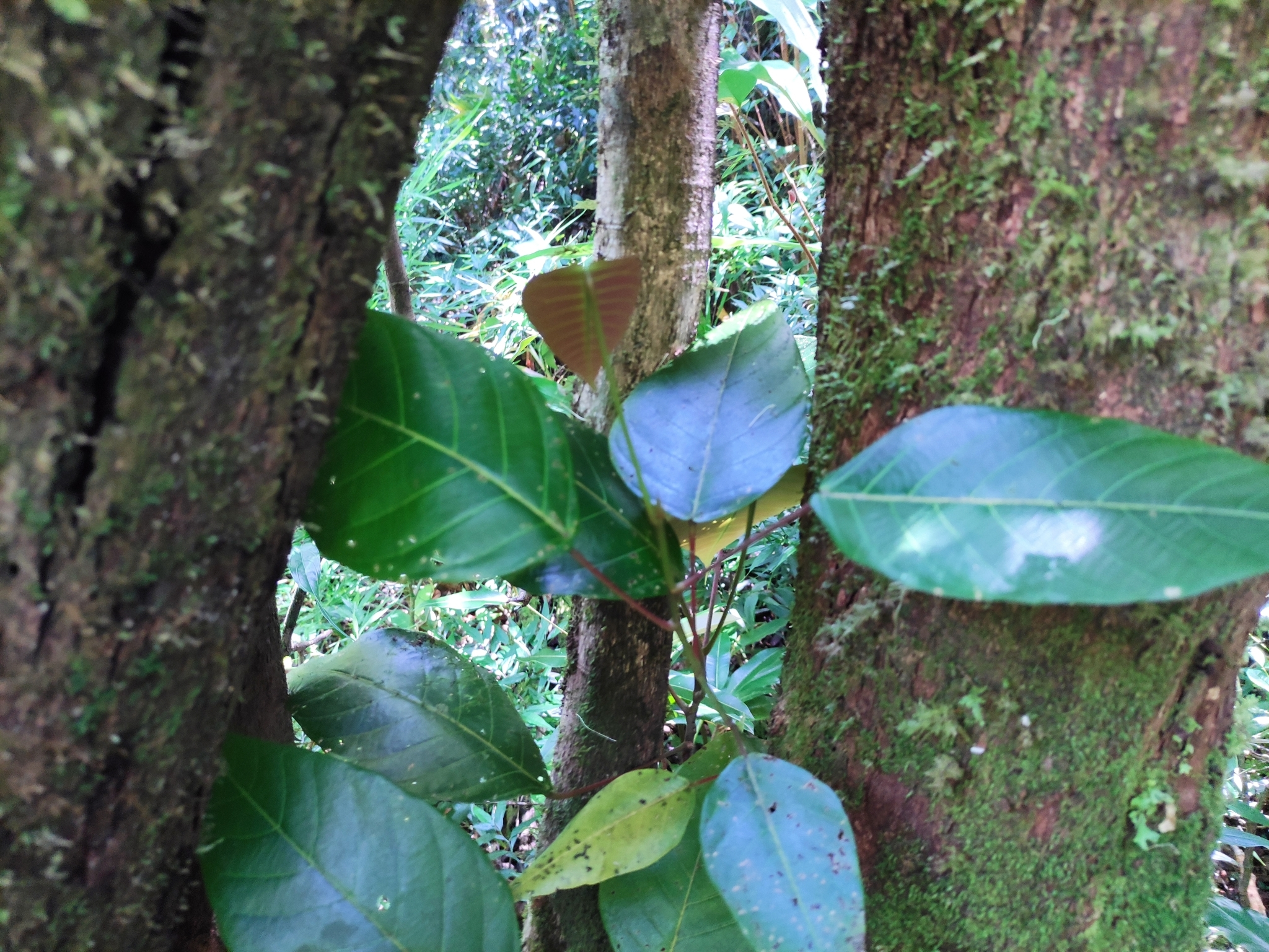
- In Réunion

Scientific classification
- Kingdom: Plantae
- Clade: Tracheophytes
- Clade: Angiosperms
- Clade: Eudicots
- Clade: Rosids
- Order: Malpighiales
- Family: Euphorbiaceae
- Genus: Hancea
- Species: H. integrifolia

Binomial name
- Hancea integrifolia (Willd.) S.E.C.Sierra, Kulju & Welzen

Synonyms
- Cordemoya integrifolia (Willd.) Baill.; Echinus integrifolius (Willd.) Baill.; Mallotus integrifolius (Willd.) Müll.Arg.; Ricinus integrifolius Willd.

= Hancea integrifolia =

Species of flowering plant

Hancea integrifolia is a plant species in the family Euphorbiaceae. It is native to Mauritius and Réunion.

It is a tree with unisexual flowers and occurs at an altitude of 1000 m asl.
