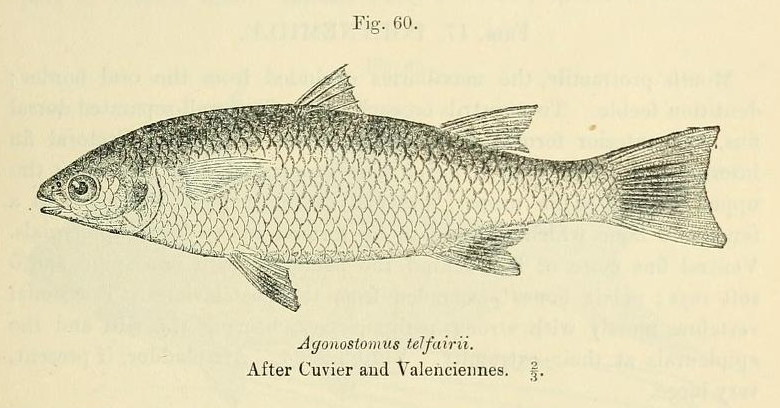

Conservation status
- Least Concern (IUCN 3.1)

Scientific classification
- Kingdom: Animalia
- Phylum: Chordata
- Class: Actinopterygii
- Order: Mugiliformes
- Family: Mugilidae
- Genus: Agonostomus
- Species: A. telfairii

Binomial name
- Agonostomus telfairii E. T. Bennett, 1832

Synonyms
- Nestis cyprinoides Valenciennes, 1836; Nestis dobuloides Valenciennes, 1836; Agonostoma dobuloides (Valenciennes, 1836); Agonostomus dobuloides (Valenciennes, 1836)

= Agonostomus telfairii =

Species of ray-finned fish

Agonostomus telfairii is a species of ray-finned fish in the family Mugilidae, the mullets. It is known by the common name fairy mullet. It is native to the islands off the eastern coast of Africa, where it can be found in freshwater bodies and estuaries in Comoros, Madagascar, Mauritius, Mayotte, and Réunion. It returns to the sea to spawn.

This species grows to a length of 75 centimetres (30 in) TL and is of minor importance to commercial fisheries. The specific name honours the Irish botanist and ship's surgeon Charles Telfair (1778-1833), who is known to have made a botanical and zoological collection in Mauritius in 1810 which included the type of this species.
