= Caldwellia imperfecta =

Conservation status
- Vulnerable (IUCN 2.3)

Scientific classification
- Kingdom: Animalia
- Phylum: Mollusca
- Class: Gastropoda
- Order: Stylommatophora
- Family: Euconulidae
- Genus: Caldwellia
- Species: C. imperfecta

Binomial name
- Caldwellia imperfecta (Deshayes, 1863)

Species of gastropod

Caldwellia imperfecta is a species of small, air-breathing land snails, terrestrial pulmonate gastropod mollusks or micromollusks in the family Euconulidae, the hive snails. This species is found in Mauritius and Réunion.
