= Calodyne =

Neighbourhood in Mauritius

Coordinates: 20.003°S 57.642°E

Calodyne is a neighbourhood located in the Rivière du Rempart District, northern Mauritius. It lies on the coast of the Indian Ocean. It forms part of the village council of Grand Gaube.
