= Badula crassa =

Conservation status
- Critically Endangered (IUCN 2.3)

Scientific classification
- Kingdom: Plantae
- Clade: Tracheophytes
- Clade: Angiosperms
- Clade: Eudicots
- Clade: Asterids
- Order: Ericales
- Family: Primulaceae
- Genus: Badula
- Species: B. crassa

Binomial name
- Badula crassa A.DC.

Species of flowering plant

Badula crassa is a species of plant in the family Primulaceae. It is found in Mauritius and Réunion. Its natural habitat is subtropical or tropical dry forests. It is threatened by habitat loss.
