= Index of Asia-related articles =

This is an index of articles related to Asia:

== By country ==
- Index of Abkhazia-related articles
- Index of Armenia-related articles
- Index of Azerbaijan-related articles
- Index of Bahrain-related articles
- Index of Bangladesh-related articles
- Index of Brunei-related articles
- Index of Cambodia-related articles
- Index of Christmas Island–related articles
- Index of Cocos (Keeling) Islands-related articles
- Index of Cyprus-related articles
- Index of East Timor-related articles
- Index of Georgia (country)-related articles
- Index of Hong Kong-related articles
- Index of Indonesia-related articles
- Index of Iran-related articles
- Index of Israel-related articles
- Index of Japan-related articles
- Index of Jordan-related articles
- Index of Kazakhstan-related articles
- Index of Kuwait-related articles
- Index of Kyrgyzstan-related articles
- Index of Laos-related articles
- Index of Macau-related articles
- Index of Malaysia-related articles
- Index of Maldives-related articles
- Index of Mongolia-related articles
- Index of Nagorno-Karabakh-related articles
- Index of Nepal-related articles
- Index of Oman-related articles
- Index of Philippines-related articles
- Index of Qatar-related articles
- Index of Russia-related articles (the following parts of Russia are in Asia: Chechnya, Ingushetia, Dagestan, Adyghea, Kabardino-Balkaria, Karachay–Cherkessia, North Ossetia, Krasnodar Krai, Stavropol Krai)
- Index of Saudi Arabia-related articles
- Index of Singapore-related articles
- Index of Taiwan-related articles
- Index of Tibet-related articles
- Index of Turkey-related articles
- Index of Turkmenistan-related articles
- Index of United Arab Emirates-related articles
- Index of Vietnam-related articles
