= Agonostomus catalai =

Conservation status
- Data Deficient (IUCN 3.1)

Scientific classification
- Kingdom: Animalia
- Phylum: Chordata
- Class: Actinopterygii
- Order: Mugiliformes
- Family: Mugilidae
- Genus: Agonostomus
- Species: A. catalai

Binomial name
- Agonostomus catalai Pellegrin, 1932

Species of ray-finned fish

Agonostomus catalai, the Comoro mullet, is a species of ray-finned fish, a mullet from the family Mugilidae. It is found in the Comoros and Madagascar where it is found in boulder strewn clear, fast flowing rivers, it may also occur in estuaries, It is eaten in Madagascar. The specific name honours René Catala (1901-1988) who was a coffee planter and biologist who collected type in Madagascar. It lays non adhesive, floating eggs.
