= Abacetus catalai =

Scientific classification
- Domain: Eukaryota
- Kingdom: Animalia
- Phylum: Arthropoda
- Class: Insecta
- Order: Coleoptera
- Suborder: Adephaga
- Family: Carabidae
- Genus: Abacetus
- Species: A. catalai

Binomial name
- Abacetus catalai (Jeannel, 1948)

Species of beetle

Abacetus catalai is a species of ground beetle in the subfamily Pterostichinae. It was described by Jeannel in 1948.
