= Acrocercops macrochalca =

Scientific classification
- Kingdom: Animalia
- Phylum: Arthropoda
- Clade: Pancrustacea
- Class: Insecta
- Order: Lepidoptera
- Family: Gracillariidae
- Genus: Acrocercops
- Species: A. macrochalca

Binomial name
- Acrocercops macrochalca Meyrick, 1910

Species of moth

Acrocercops macrochalca is a moth of the family Gracillariidae. It is known from Mauritius.

This species has a wingspan of 10mm, the head, thorax & palpi are white, abdomen light ochreous-grey. The forewings are very narrowly elongated, golden-orange fulvous with three snow-white spots. Hindwings are pale fuscous
