= Catovair =

Regional airline based in Mauritius

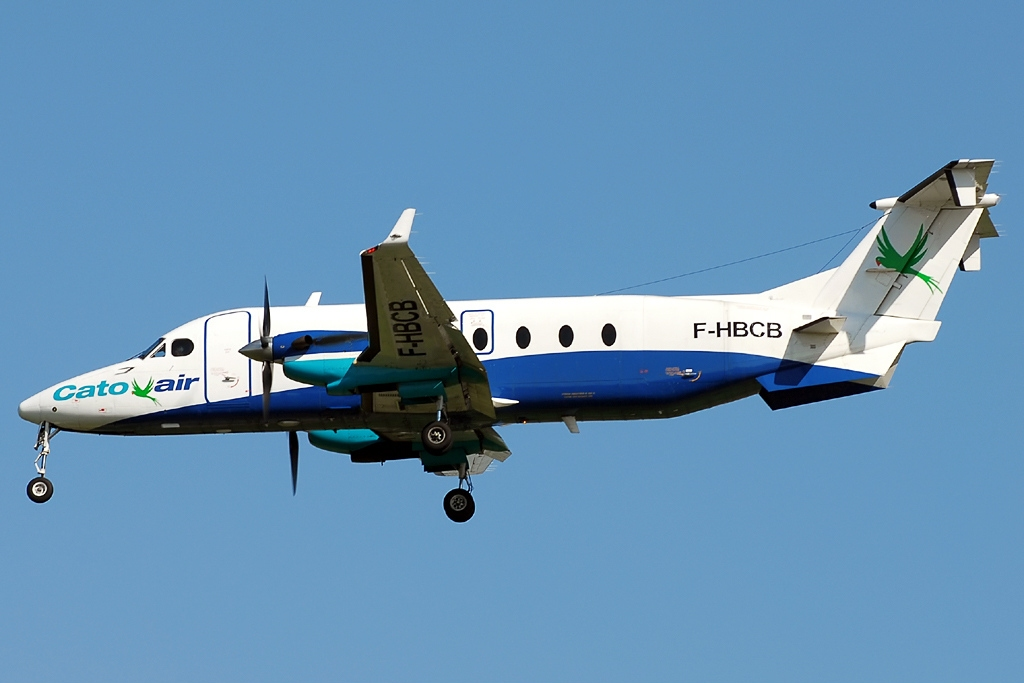
IATA	ICAO	Call sign
OC	ABL	CATOVAIR
- Founded: 28 August 2005
- Ceased operations: 1 June 2007
- Hubs: Mauritius
- Focus cities: Réunion; Rodrigues
- Fleet size: 3
- Destinations: 3
- Headquarters: Ile Maurice

Catovair was a regional airline based in Mauritius. Catovair had plans to buy an ATR 42.

Catovair ceased its operation in 2007. The name derives from the French phrase "Cateau vert", which means echo parakeet in Mauritius.

== Fleet ==
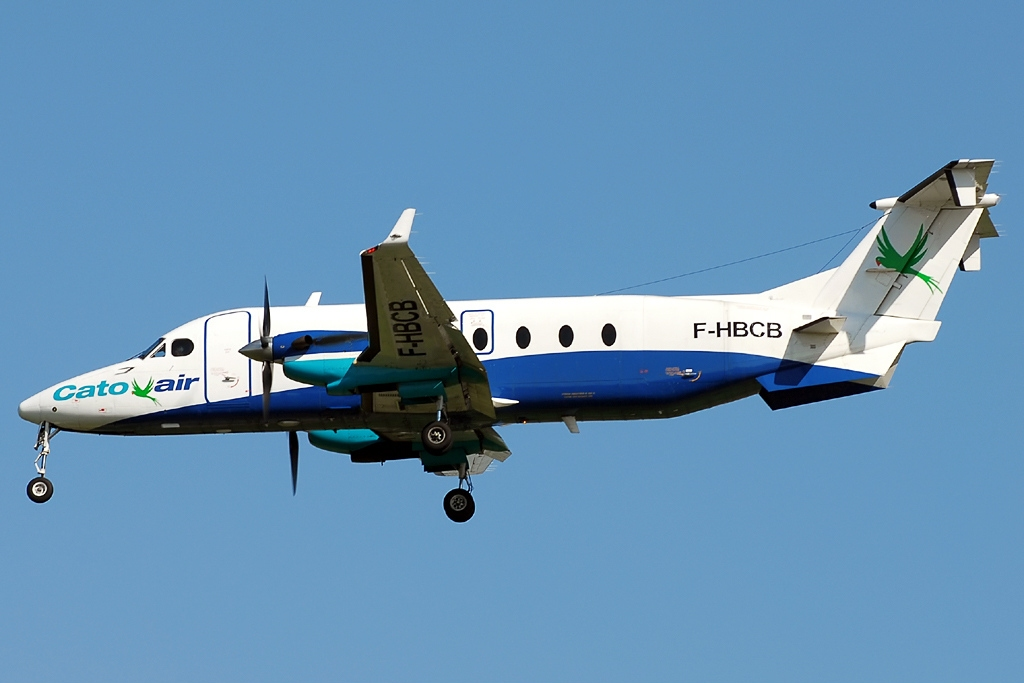
A Catovair Beech 1900D at Orly Airport

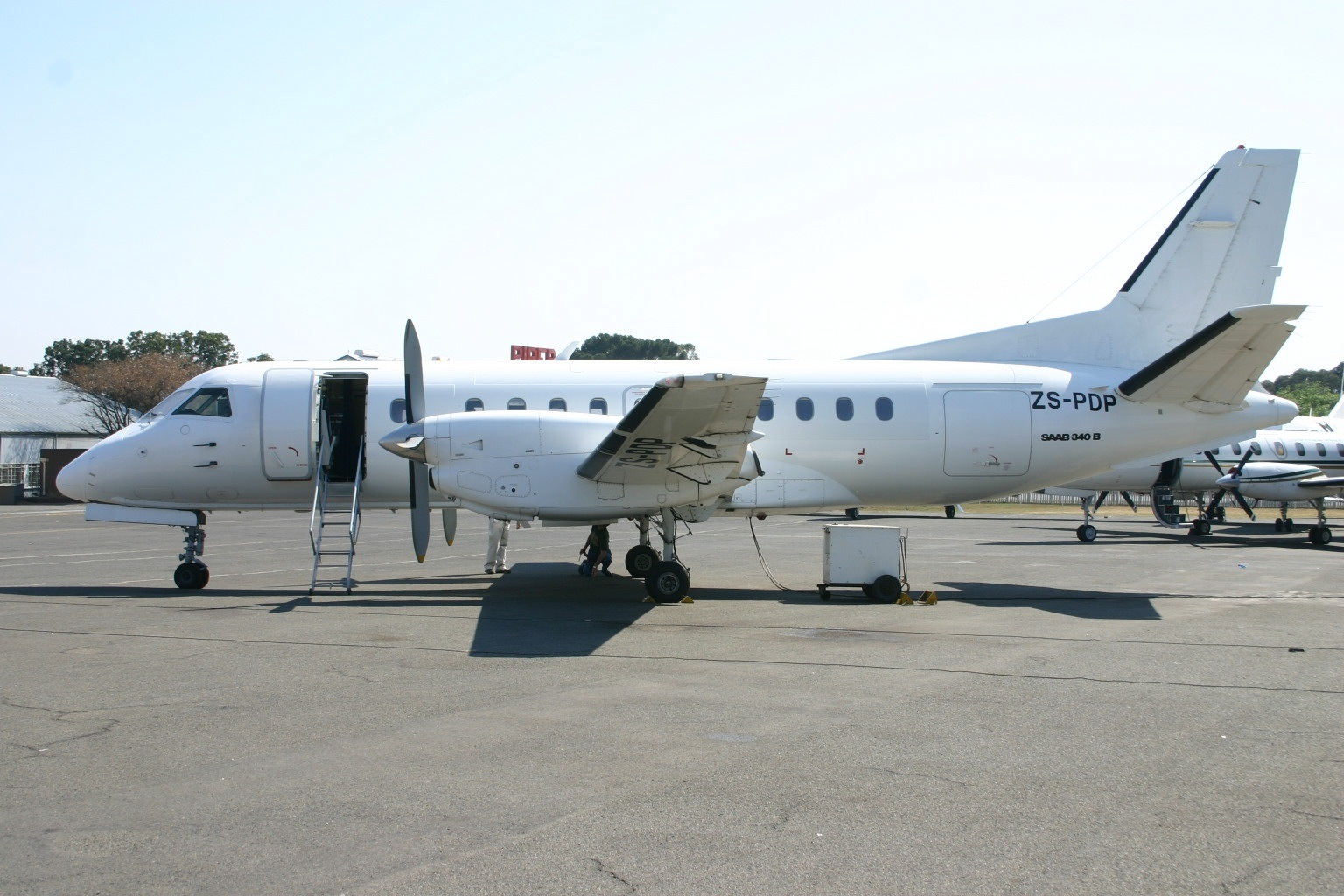
A Catovair Saab 340B

The Catovair fleet included the following aircraft:

Catovair fleet
Aircraft	In fleet	Retired	Orders	Passengers		Notes
Aircraft	In fleet	Retired	Orders	Y	Total	Notes
Saab 340	—	1	—	34	34	Delivered to Norse Air
Beech 1900D	—	2	—	19	19	Delivered to Chalair Aviation
Total	—	3				

== Destinations ==
It only served 3 destinations:

State	City	Airport	Notes
Mauritius	Plaine Magnien	Sir Seewoosagur Ramgoolam International Airport	Hub
Réunion	Saint Denis	Roland Garros Airport	
Rodrigues	Plaine Corail	Plaine Corail Airport	
