= Billy Jacobson =

South African jockey

Bill Jacobson
Personal information
- Born: 2 May 1980 (age 46) Durban, South Africa
- Occupation: Jockey

Horse racing career
- Sport: Horse racing
- Career wins: ongoing

Major racing wins
- The Cape Derby with Garden Rock

Significant horses
- Greek Hero, Lone Star Park, Chivas, Soldier Field,
- Updated on 12 September 2009

Billy Jacobson (born 2 May 1980, Durban, South Africa), is a South African jockey currently riding in New Zealand. He is known as the "Riding Machine" in Mauritius for having a fall in his first meeting in Mauritius and coming out unhurt. He has also ridden in Spain, France, Zimbabwe, and Dubai.

Jacobson began riding in New Zealand in the 2023/24 season, winning 19 races from 235 starts. He initially rode out of the Waikato area. He rode his first New Zealand winner on the Michael Moroney and Pam Gerard-trained Lingjun Xiongfeng in the Ellerslie Events 1500m race at Pukekohe track in early December 2023. The victory came in Jacobson's 25th attempt on New Zealand soil, though he picked up a notable black-type second placing aboard Te Akau stalwart Prise De Fer in the Group 3 Eagle Technology Stakes (1600m) the weekend prior at Te Rapa.

In February 2025 Jacobson started riding in the South Island. His first win in the South was in the Invercargill Gold Cup on Noble Knight for Sandra Cunningham.
