= List of rivers of Mauritius =

The following is a list of rivers of Mauritius.

== Mainland ==
- Rivière Cascade
- Rivière Citrons
- Rivière des Créoles
- Rivière des Galets
- Rivière des Lataniers
- Grande Rivière Noire
- Grande Rivière Nord-Ouest
- Rivière du Poste
- Rivière du Poste de Flacq
- Rivière du Rempart
- Rivière Saint-Denis
- Rivière Savanne
- Grande Rivière Sud-Est
- Rivière Tamarin
- Rivière Terre Rouge
- Rivière du Tombeau
- Rivière Rempart
- Rivière la chaux
