= Le Morne Brabant =

Le Morne Cultural Landscape
UNESCO World Heritage Site
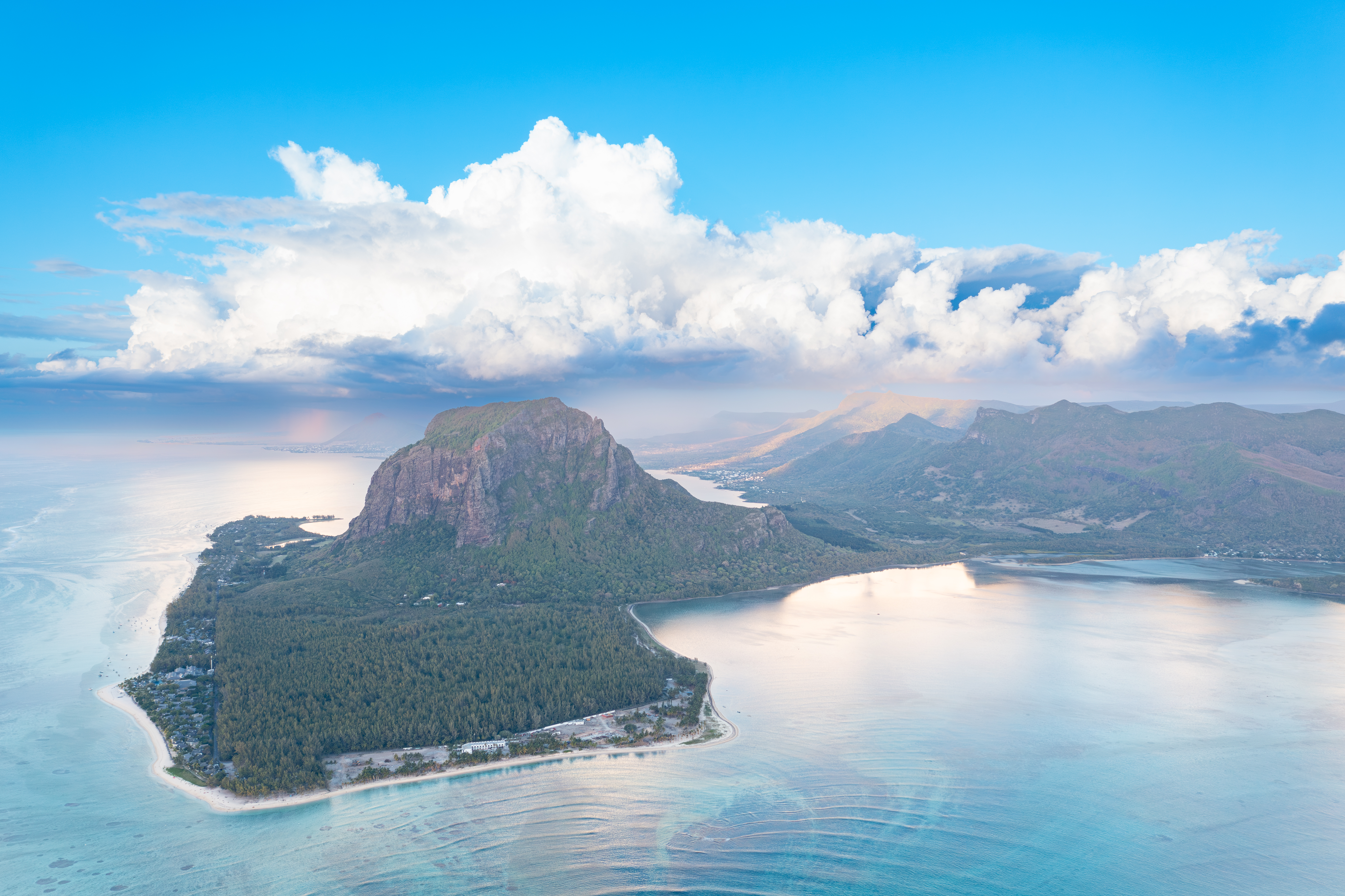
- Le Morne Peninsula

- Location within Mauritius
- Location: Mauritius
- Criteria: Cultural: (iii), (vi)
- Reference: 1259bis
- Inscription: 2008 (32nd Session)
- Extensions: 2011
- Area: 3.496 km^{2} (863.9 acres)
- Buffer zone: 24.05 km^{2} (5,942.9 acres)
- Coordinates: 20°27′7″S 57°19′42″E

Le Morne Brabant [lə mɔʁn bʁa.bɑ̃] is a peninsula at the extreme southwestern tip of the Indian Ocean island of Mauritius. On it is a basaltic monolith of the same name 556 metres (1,824 ft) high. Its summit covers an area of over 12 hectares (30 acres). There are many caves and overhangs on the steep slopes. It is largely surrounded by a lagoon and is a well known tourist attraction. It is also a refuge for two rare plants, the Mandrinette and the Boucle d'Oreille. The peninsula of Le Morne benefits from a micro-climate. The mountain is named after the Dutch East India Company ship Brabant that ran aground here on 29 December 1783.

UNESCO added Morne Brabant Mountain to the World Heritage List in 2008.

The coast off Le Morne Brabant is often cited as the location of an underwater waterfall.

== Peninsula ==
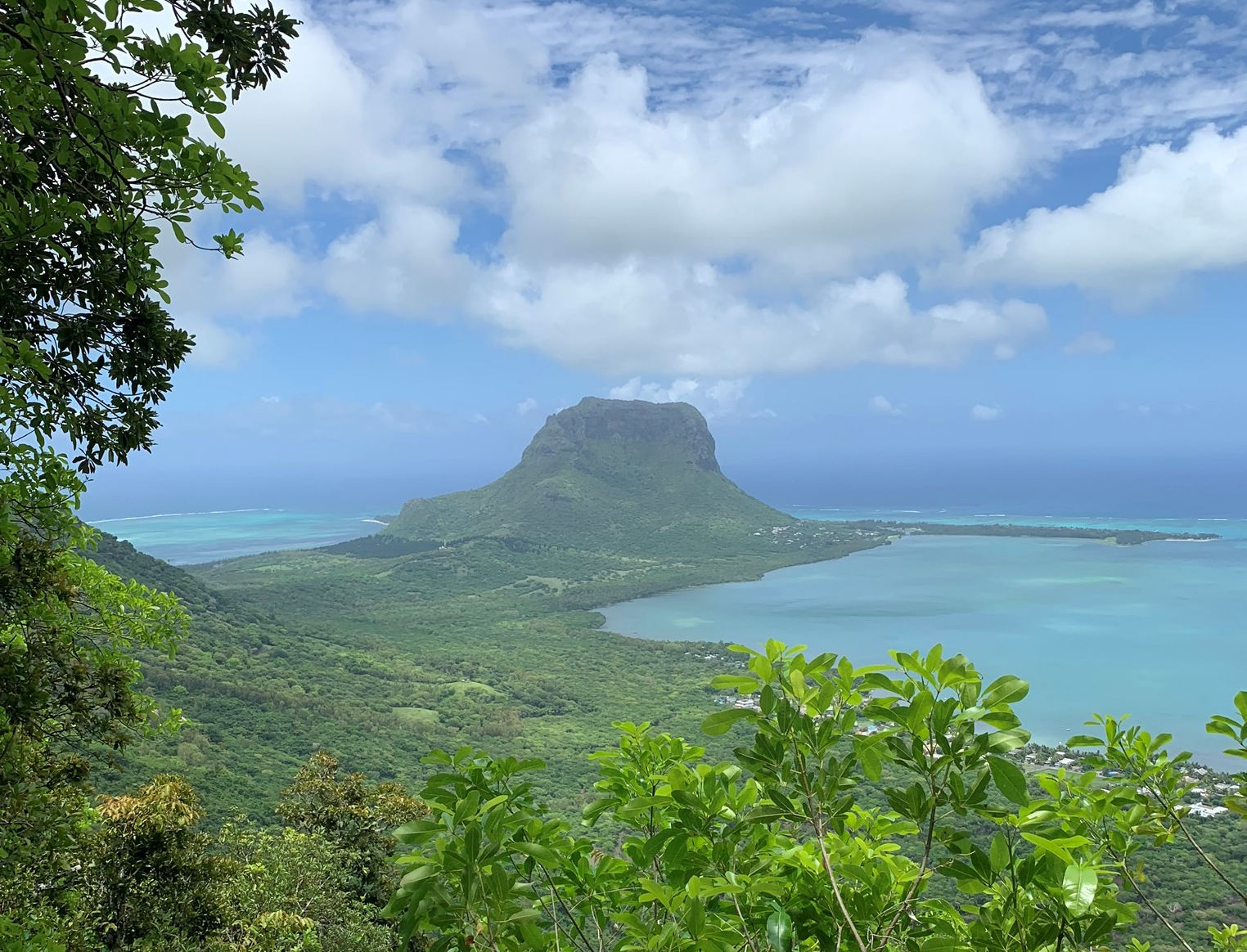
View of the peninsula with Le Morne, as seen from one of the viewpoints of Ebony Forest Chamarel.

The peninsula is steeped in cultural myth and legend in the early 19th century as a suggested refuge for Maroons and people who escaped slavery. After the abolition of slavery in Mauritius, on 1 February 1835 it is rumored that a police expedition was dispatched there ostensibly to inform those who escaped slavery that emancipation had made them legally free men and women. The arrival of the police at the base of the mountain was (according to legend) misinterpreted by the former slaves who had scrambled to the summit (fearing that they were to be arrested and re-enslaved) and subsequently elected to leap to their deaths from the rock and die by suicide by landing in the ocean, rather than be recaptured back into slavery. Since 1987 the date is celebrated (particularly by Mauritian creoles) as the Annual Commemoration of the Abolition of Slavery.

Le Morne has been declared a World Heritage Site. The monument includes an inscription of this extract from the poem "Le Morne Territoire Marron" by Richard Sedley Assonne; "There were hundreds of them, but my people the maroons chose the kiss of death over the chains of slavery."

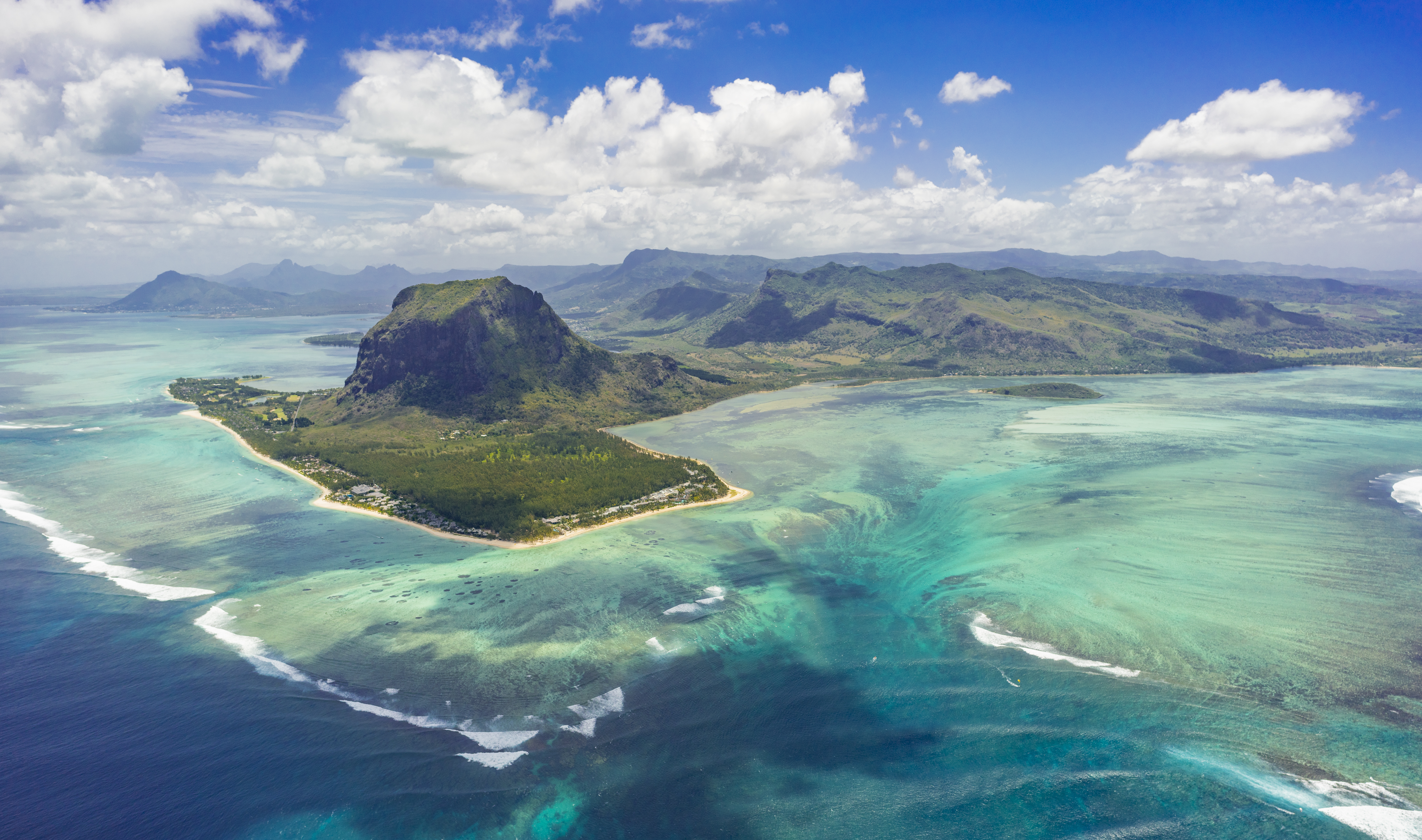
Aerial view of the "underwater waterfall"

Le Morne highlights the historical significance of slavery.
