= Amateur radio call signs in Africa =

Amateur radio call signs in Africa are codes used to identify all radio communications, broadcasts and transmissions. The International Telecommunication Union assigns Africa as ITU region #1. It has assigned call signs prefix blocks to countries including 77 DXCC entities in and off-shore of Africa. Western Sahara is not a DXCC entity but uses SØ as a prefix.

Amateur radio or ham radio is practised by operators holding nationally allocated call signs in African countries or foreign administered territories and other nations or DXCC entities. Call sign allocation from the International Telegraph Union is administered by national political authorities and international mandates.

== Call sign blocks ==
The following call sign blocks are used for all radio communication, broadcasting or transmission:

=== CQ Zone 33/northwest Africa, European territories ===
Call sign block	DXCC Entity	Approx. # call signs
3V, TS	Tunisia	53
7R, 7T–7Y	Algeria	94
CN, 5C–5G	Morocco	453
CQ3, CQ9, CR3, CR9, CS3, CS9, CT3, CT9	Madeira Is. (Portugal)	408
AM8, AN8, AO8, EA8–EH8	Canary Is. (Spain)	3,693
AM9, AN9, AO9, EA9, EB9. EC9, ED9. EE9, EF9, EG9, EH9	Ceuta (Spain)	771
AM9, AN9, AO9, EC9, ED9	Melilla (Spain)	incl. in Ceuta
IG9 & IH9	Pelagie, Pantelleria (Italy)	??
SØ	Western Sahara	32

In Morocco CN8 is for residents, CNØ is for visitors. SØ for Western Sahara is an unofficial prefix, not issued by the ITU.

=== CQ Zone 34/northeast Africa ===
Call sign block	DXCC Entity	Approx. # call signs
5A	Libya	22
SSN-STZ, 6TA–6UZ	Sudan	46
Z8	South Sudan	??
SSA–SSN, SU, 6AA–6BZ	Egypt	113

Sudan further subdivides its call signs thus (with possible changes due to the 2011 independence of South Sudan): ST2 Khartoum and its region, ST3 Wad Madani, central region, ST4 Al Ubayyid, Kurdufan region, ST5 Kassala, eastern region, ST6 Port Sudan, northeast region, ST7 Ad'Damir, northwest region, ST8 Al'Fashir, Darfour region, and ST9 Malakal, central-south region; Wau, Bahr-al-Ghazal region.

=== CQ Zone 35/west coast (northern) central Africa ===
Call sign block	DXCC Entity	Approx. # call signs
3X	Guinea	46
5N–5O	Nigeria	152
5T	Mauritania	1
5U	Niger	38
5V	Togo	49
6V–6W	Senegal	137
9G	Ghana	121
9L	Sierra Leone	62
C5	The Gambia	2
D4	Cape Verde	26
EL, 5L–5M, 6Z, A8, D5	Liberia	127
J5	Guinea-Bissau	45
TU	Côte d'Ivoire	108
TY	Benin	46
TZ	Mali	52
XT	Burkina Faso	59

Nigeria further subdivides its prefixes thus: 5N1 = OGUN, OYO, ONDO; 5N2 = KWARA, KOGI, NIGER, OSUN; 5N3 = EDO, DELTA, ANAMBRA; 5N4 = ENUGU, RIVERS, ABIA; 5N5 = CROSS RIVERS, AKWA-IBOM, IMO, BENUE; 5N6 = PLATEAU, TARABA, BAUCHI; 5N7 = ADAMAWA, YOBE, BORNO; 5N8 = KANO, JIGAWA; 5N9 = KADUNA, SOKOTO, KEBBI, KATSINA; and 5NØ = LAGOS STATE AND ABUJA, F.C.T.

Senegal further subdivides its prefixes thus: 6W1 Dakar, 6W2 Ziguinchor, 6W3 Diourbei, 6W4 St. Louis 6W5 Tambacounda, 6W6 Kaolack, 6W7 Thies, 6W8 Louga, 6W9 Fatick and 6WØ Kolda.

Liberia further subdivides its prefixes thus: EL1 Grand Bassa, River Cess, EL2 Montserrado, Bomi, Margibi, EL3 Sinoe, EL4 Maryland, Grand Kru, EL5 Lofa, EL6 Grand Gedeh, EL7 Bong, EL8 Nimba, EL9 Grand Cape Mount, and ELØ for Novices and Club Stations

=== CQ Zone 36/west coast (southern) central Africa ===
Call sign block	DXCC Entity	Approx. # call signs
3C	Equatorial Guinea	29
3CØ	Annobon Is. (Equatorial Guinea)	9
9I–9J	Zambia	89
9O–9T	Democratic Republic of Congo (Zaire)	62
9U	Burundi	18
9X	Rwanda	32
D2–D3	Angola	42
S9	São Tomé and Príncipe	50
TJ	Cameroon	39
TL	Central Africa Republic	45
TN	Republic of Congo	27
TR	Gabon	90
TT	Chad	62
ZD7	St. Helena (UK)	49
ZD8	Ascension Is. (UK)	52

Democratic Republic of Congo (Zaire) further subdivides its call signs thus: 9Q1 – Kinshasa, 9Q2 – Bas Congo, 9Q3 – Bandundu, 9Q4 – Equateur, 9Q5 – Province orientale, 9Q6 – North Kivu, South Kivu, Maniema, 9Q7– Katanga, 9Q8 – Oriental Kasai, 9Q9 – Occidental Kasai, and 9QØ – Reserved

=== CQ Zone 37/east coast mainland Africa ===
Call sign block	DXCC Entity	Approx. # call signs
5H–5I	Tanzania	199
5X	Uganda	56
5Y–5Z	Kenya	145
7O	Socotra (Yemen)	??
7Q	Malawi	95
C8–C9	Mozambique	98
E3	Eritrea	15
ET, 9E–9F	Ethiopia	39
J2	Djibouti	82
T5, 6OA–6OZ	Somalia	39

For Eritrea only contacts made November 14, 1962, and before, or May 24, 1991, and after, count for this entity.

Tanzania further subdivides its prefix thus: 5H1 – Zanzibar and Pemba Islands, 5H2 – Arysha, Kilimanjaro, Tanga, 5H3 – Pwani, Dar es Salaam (including Mafia Island), 5H4 – Morogoro, 5H5 – Lindi, Mtwara, Ruvuma, 5H6 – Iringa, 5H7 – Mbeya, 5H8 – Kigoma, Rukwa, Tabora, 5H9 – Ziwa Magharibi, Mwanza, Mara, Shinyanga (including Ukerewe Islands), and 5HØ – Dodoma, Singida.

Somalia further subdivides its call signs according to the province of issue: 6OØ indicates the license was issued in Puntland, Northern Somalia, and; 6O1 is issued in Southern Somalia.

=== CQ Zone 38/southern Africa ===
Call sign block	DXCC Entity	Approx. # call signs
3DA0	Eswatini (formerly Swaziland till 2018)	101
3Y	Bouvet (Norway)	12
7P	Lesotho	98
A2, 8O	Botswana	100
V50–V59	Namibia	170
Z2	Zimbabwe	121
ZD9	Tristan da Cunha & Gough Is. (UK)	15
ZR–ZU,	South Africa	9,696
ZS8	Prince Edward & Marion Is. (South Africa)	7

==== South Africa ====
South Africa further divides its call signs thus:

- ZS1 Western Cape Province
- ZS2 Eastern Cape Province
- ZS3 Northern Cape Province
- ZS4 Free State Province
- ZS5 Kwazulu-Natal Province
- ZS6 Gauteng, Mpumalanga, Northwest and Limpopo provinces
- ZS7 Antarctica
- ZS8 Prince Edward & Marion Islands
- ZU Designates an entry-level licence
- ZR Used to designate a restricted licence but has been merged into the unrestricted class together with ZS and follows the same region numbers as above
- ZT Very rarely used only for contest stations
- ZSLnnn call sign is allocated to 'Shortwave Listeners'.

=== CQ Zone 39/Africa off-shore, Indian Ocean ===
Call sign block	DXCC Entity	Approx. # call signs
3B6,7	Agalega & St. Brandon Is. (Mauritius)	14
3B8	Mauritius	123
3B9	Rodrigues Is. (Mauritius)	15
5R–5S, 6X	Madagascar	93
D6	Comoros	25
FH	Mayotte (France)	51
FR/G	Glorioso Is. (France)	??
FR/J,E	Juan de Nova, Europa (France)	??
FR	Reunion Is. (France)	237
FR/T	Tromelin Is. (France)	??
FT5W	Crozet Is. (France)	??
FT5X	Kerguelen Is. (France)	??
FT5Z	Amsterdam & St. Paul Is. (France)	??
S7	Seychelles	86
VKØ	Heard Is. (Australia)	35
VQ9	Chagos Is. (UK)	80

== History of call sign allocation ==
The call sign allocation history of mainland Africa and off-shore islands is complex and related to the colonial status of European powers in the early-20th century period. Call signs changed in relation to various independence movements, particularly following World War II and in the 1960s.

=== International Radiotelegraph Conferences ===
The conference held in 1927 assigned call prefixes to Morocco (CNA–CNZ), Egypt (SUA–SUZ), Republic of Liberia (ELA–ELZ), Ethiopia (ETA–ETZ), and the Union of South Africa (ZSA–ZUZ). These, however, did not necessarily include amateur radio operation. African areas administered politically by colonizing countries (i.e. Great Britain, Portugal, France, etc.) adopted call signs issued to those countries for colonial purposes.

The 1947 Atlantic City ITU Conference reallocated call sign blocks to African countries and European colonies according to this table.

1947 Call sign block	1947 Country or Colonial power
CNA–CNZ	Morocco
CQA–CRZ	Portuguese colonies
DNA–DQZ	Belgian Congo
ELA–ELZ	Republic of Liberia
ETA–ETZ	Ethiopia
FAA–FZZ	France and its colonies
HWA–HYZ	France and its colonies
IAA–IZZ	Italy and its colonies
SSA–SUZ	Egypt
THA–THZ	France and its colonies
VPA–VSZ	British Colonies
XXA–XXZ	Portuguese colonies
ZBA–ZJZ	British Colonies
ZQA–ZQZ	British Colonies
ZRA–ZUZ	Union of South Africa
3VA–3VZ	France and its colonies

== See also ==
- Amateur radio international operation
- Amateur radio license
- Call signs
- ITU prefix – amateur and experimental stations
