= Henri Speville =

Mauritian footballer (born 1971)

Personal information
- Date of birth: November 1, 1971 (age 54)
- Place of birth: Mauritius
- Position: Defender

Team information
- Current team: Pamplemousses SC

Senior career*
Years	Team	Apps	(Gls)
2000–2001	Olympique de Moka	-	(-)
2001–2006	AS Port-Louis 2000	-	(-)
2006–2010	Pamplemousses SC	-	(-)

International career
1996–2007	Mauritius	72	(1)
Medal record
Men's football
Representing Mauritius
Indian Ocean Island Games
Gold medal – first place	2003 Mauritius
- * Club domestic league appearances and goals as of January 27, 2007

Henri Speville (born November 1, 1971) is a Mauritian football defender who last played for Pamplemousses SC. He was also a member of the Mauritius national football team from 1996–2007, earning 72 caps.

== Honours ==
Mauritius

- Indian Ocean Island Games: Gold Medalist, 2003
