= Charles Content =

Mauritian football player

Personal information
- Full name: Charles Content
- Date of birth: February 14, 1987 (age 39)
- Place of birth: Mauritius
- Position: Midfielder

Team information
- Current team: Pamplemousses SC
- Number: 11

Senior career*
Years	Team	Apps	(Gls)
2007–2009	AS Rivière du Rempart	-	(-)
2009–	Pamplemousses SC	-	(-)

International career
2008–	Mauritius	9	(0)
- * Club domestic league appearances and goals

Charles Content (born February 14, 1987) is a Mauritian football player who currently plays for Pamplemousses SC in the Mauritian Premier League and for the Mauritius national football team as a midfielder. He is featured on the Mauritian national team in the official 2010 FIFA World Cup video game.
