= List of football clubs in Zimbabwe =

The following is an incomplete list of association football clubs based in Zambia. For a complete list see Category:Football clubs in Zimbabwe

== List of Zimbabwean football clubs ==
=== 1 ===
- 12la United

=== A ===
- Agama
- Air Zimbabwe Jets Harare
- Amazulu FC

=== B ===
- Bantu Rovers (Bulawayo)
- Batanai
- Bikita Minerals
- Bindura United
- Blackpool
- Black Aces
- Black Mambas (Harare)
- Black Rhinos F.C.
- Blue Swallows
- Border Strikers
- Brian Ken
- Buffaloes Matare
- Buymore (CAPS FC)
- Bulawayo Chiefs F.C.

=== C ===
- CAPS United (Harare)
- Chapungu F.C.
- Chapungu United F.C.
- Chegutu Pirates
- Chicken Inn F.C.
- Chrome Stars
- Circle United
- Cottco (Kadoma)
- Corrugated
- Cranbonne Bullets

=== D ===
- Darryn T
- DT Africa United
- Dynamos (Harare)

=== E ===
- Eagles (Chitungwiza)
- Eastern Lions
- Eiffel Flats
- Elvington

=== F ===
- FC Victoria (Masvingo)
- Fire Batteries

=== G ===
- Green Fuel
- Gunners F.C. (Harare)
- Guni United

=== H ===
- Hackney
- Harare City F.C.
- Hardrock (Kwekwe)
- Herentals F.C. (Harare)
- Highlanders (Bulawayo)
- How Mine FC
- Hunters
- Hwange (Hwange)

=== I ===
- Intundla

=== J ===
- Jena Mine
- Jets

=== K ===
- Kambuzuma United (Harare)
- Kango
- Kiglon F.C. (Chitungwiza)
- Kwekwe United

=== L ===
- Lancashire Steel F.C.
- Lengthens (Kuwadzana, Harare)
- Lulu Rovers

=== M ===
- Mandava United
- Manica Diamonds F.C.
- Masvingo United F.C.
- Mhangura
- Midlands Cables
- Mkwasine
- Monomotapa United (Harare)
- Motor Action (Harare)
- Morris F.C (Harare)
- Mushowani Stars F.C.
- Mwana Africa F.C. (Bindura)
- MWOS

=== N ===
- Njube Sundowns F.C.
- Ngezi Platinum F.C.

=== O ===
- Olivine

=== P ===
- Platinum (Zvishavane)

=== R ===
- Railstars (Bulawayo)
- Red Seal
- Rufaro Rovers

=== S ===
- Savanna
- Scottland
- Shabanie F.C.
- Shabanie Mine (Zvishavane)
- Shangani
- Shu Shine F.C.
- Simba Bhora
- Sporting Lions
- Sundowns

=== T ===
- TelOne
- Triangle United
- Triple B FC
- Tanganda
- Thorngrove
- Tongogara
- Trojan

=== U ===
- Underhill F.C.
- Unicem

Y

- Yadah Stars F.C.

=== Z ===
- Zambezi River Authority
- Zimall
- Zimbabwe Saints F.C.
- Zisco Steel
- ZRP Tomlinson
- ZPC Kariba

== Defunct football clubs of Rhodesia ==
=== A ===
- Alexandra (Bulawayo)
- Arcadia United

=== B ===
- Beira
- Black Rhinos (Mutare)
- British South African Police (Bulawayo)
- Bulawayo Athletic Club
- Bulawayo Rovers

=== C ===
- Castle Lions
- Chibuku F.C. (Salisbury)
- Chibuku Shumba
- Civil Service (Umtali)
- Crusaders (Umtali)

=== D ===
- DMB Tigers (Bulawayo)

=== F ===
- Forresters (Umtali)

=== G ===
- Gweru United

=== K ===
- Karls United
- Kings (Bulawayo)
- Kopje (Bulawayo)

=== L ===
- Lusitanos

=== M ===
- Mangula
- Meikles
- Metal Box

=== N ===
- Nchanga Sports

=== P ===
- Poastal (Bulawayo)
- Police (Bulawayo)
- ProNutto

=== Q ===
- Queens (Bulawayo)

=== R ===
- Railway (Bulawayo)
- Ramblers (Umtali)
- Raylton (Bulawayo)
- Rusape United (Rusape)

=== S ===
- Saint Paul
- Salisbury Callies (Bulawayo)
- Salisbury City Wanderers
- Salisbury Tornados
- Salisbury United (Bulawayo)

=== T ===
- Terriers (Bulawayo)
- Triple B FC

=== U ===
- Umtali FC (Umtali)

=== Z ===
- Zimbabwe Saints (Bulawayo)
- ZiscoSteel (Redcliff)
