= List of Zimbabwean football champions =

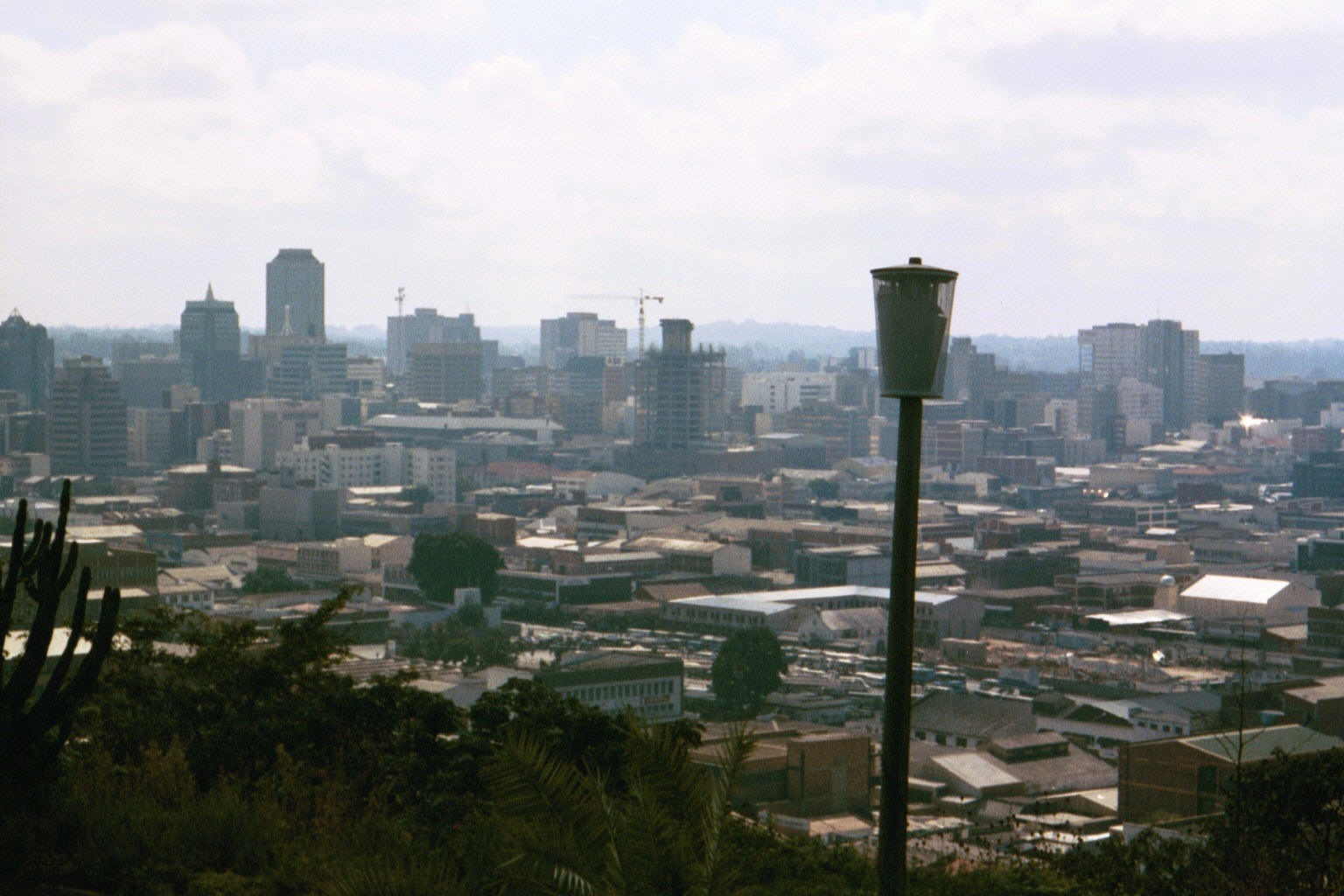
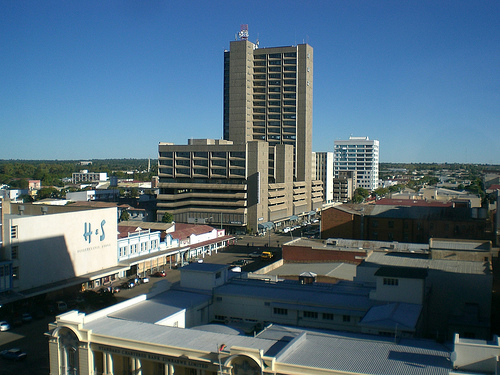
Apart from the two titles won by the Mutare-based Black Rhinos, and one won by St Paul's, from Murewa, and Simba Bhora, from Shamva, every national championship held in either Rhodesia or Zimbabwe has been won by a team from Harare (left, Salisbury until 1982) or Bulawayo (right).

The association football champions of Zimbabwe are the winners of the highest league in Zimbabwean football, which is the Zimbabwe Premier Soccer League (ZPSL). The ZPSL was founded in 1980, after Zimbabwe's internationally recognised independence, as a successor to the Rhodesia National Football League, which started in 1962. Originally governed by the Zimbabwe Football Association – the renamed Rhodesia Football Association, created in 1965 – the ZPSL has run itself since 1993.

The first edition of the Rhodesia National Football League took place in 1962, when Bulawayo Rovers won both the inaugural league championship and Cup of Rhodesia to claim the Double in the first season of nationally organised competition in Rhodesia. Since then, the championship has been largely dominated by teams from the country's capital, Harare (Salisbury until 1982), and second-largest city, Bulawayo: all but three of the 50 championships contested in the country have been won by a team based in one of these two cities.

The record 22 titles won by Dynamos is more than twice as many as the number won by the second-most decorated, Bulawayo's Highlanders, who have won seven. Dynamos and Highlanders share the record for most consecutive championships won, each having won four titles in succession. Harare-based Dynamos are the most successful team in cup competition, with ten cup-final victories to their name, one more than CAPS United. Unlike the league, the cup has been won numerous times by clubs from outside the traditional centres of Harare and Bulawayo; provincial sides such as Hwange, Mhangura and Masvingo United have claimed the cup on multiple occasions. The Double has been achieved 11 times in Zimbabwean football; since Bulawayo Rovers won both the league and cup in 1962, the Double has been repeated by Dynamos (seven times), Zimbabwe Saints, Black Rhinos, Highlanders and CAPS United.

== Champions ==
Key

| ^{†} | Club won the Double (both league and cup) during that season |
| (number of titles) | A running tally of the total number of championships won by each club is kept in brackets. |
| (number of cups) | A running tally of the total number of cups won by each club is kept in brackets. |

=== Rhodesia National Football League (1962–79) ===
| Season | League champions (number of titles) | League runners-up | Cup winners (number of cups) |
|---|---|---|---|
| 1962 | Bulawayo Rovers (1)^{†} | Salisbury City | Bulawayo Rovers (1)^{†} |
| 1963 | Dynamos (1) | Salisbury Callies | Salisbury Callies (1) |
| 1964 | Bulawayo Rovers (2) | | No cup held |
| 1965 | Dynamos (2) | | Salisbury City Wanderers (1) |
| 1966 | St Paul's | Bulawayo Rovers | Mangula (1) |
| 1967 | State House Tornados (1)^{[B]} | | Salisbury Callies (2) |
| 1968 | Bulawayo Sables (1) | | Arcadia United (1) |
| 1969 | Bulawayo Sables (2) | | Arcadia United (2) |
| 1970 | Dynamos (3) | | Wankie (1) |
| 1971 | Arcadia United (1) | | Chibuku Shumba (1) |
| 1972 | Salisbury Sables (1) | | Mangula (2) |
| 1973 | Metal Box (1) | Highlanders | Wankie (2) |
| 1974 | Salisbury Sables (2) | | Chibuku Shumba (2) |
| 1975 | Chibuku Shumba (2) | | Salisbury Callies (3) |
| 1976 | Dynamos (4)^{†} | | Dynamos (1)^{†} |
| 1977 | Zimbabwe Saints (1)^{†} | | Zimbabwe Saints (1)^{†} |
| 1978 | Dynamos (5) | | Risco Steel (1) |
| 1979 | CAPS United (1) | Zimbabwe Saints | Zimbabwe Saints (2) |

=== Zimbabwe Premier Soccer League (1980–present) ===
| Season | League champions (number of titles) | League runners-up | Cup winners (number of cups) |
|---|---|---|---|
| 1980 | Dynamos (6) | Black Aces^{[C]} | CAPS United (1) |
| 1981 | Dynamos (7) | Rio Tinto | CAPS United (2) |
| 1982 | Dynamos (8) | | CAPS United (3) |
| 1983 | Dynamos (9) | Rio Tinto | CAPS United (4) |
| 1984 | Black Rhinos (1)^{†} | Arcadia United | Black Rhinos (1)^{†} |
| 1985 | Dynamos (10)^{†} | Highlanders | Dynamos (2)^{†} |
| 1986 | Dynamos (11)^{†} | CAPS United | Dynamos (3)^{†} |
| 1987 | Black Rhinos (2) | Dynamos | Zimbabwe Saints (3) |
| 1988 | Zimbabwe Saints (2) | Dynamos | Dynamos (4) |
| 1989 | Dynamos (12)^{†} | Zimbabwe Saints | Dynamos (5)^{†} |
| 1990 | Highlanders (1)^{†} | CAPS United | Highlanders (1)^{†} |
| 1991 | Dynamos (13) | Black Rhinos | Wankie (3) |
| 1992 | Black Aces (1) | CAPS United | CAPS United (5) |
| 1993 | Highlanders (2) | CAPS United | Tanganda (1) |
| 1994 | Dynamos (14) | Highlanders | Blackpool (1) |
| 1995 | Dynamos (15) | Blackpool | Chapungu United (1)^{[D]} |
| 1996 | CAPS United (2) | Dynamos | Dynamos (6) |
| 1997 | Dynamos (16) | CAPS United | CAPS United (6) |
| 1998–99 | Highlanders (3) | Dynamos | CAPS United (7) |
| 2000 | Highlanders (4) | Amazulu | No cup held |
| 2001 | Highlanders (5) | Amazulu | Highlanders (2) |
| 2002 | Highlanders (6) | Black Rhinos | Masvingo United (1) |
| 2003 | Amazulu (1) | Highlanders | Dynamos (7) |
| 2004 | CAPS United (3)^{†} | Highlanders | CAPS United (8)^{†} |
| 2005 | CAPS United (4) | Masvingo United | Masvingo United (2) |
| 2006 | Highlanders (7) | Motor Action^{[E]} | Mwana Africa (1) |
| 2007 | Dynamos (17)^{†} | Highlanders | Dynamos (8)^{†} |
| 2008 | Monomotapa United (1) | Dynamos | CAPS United (9) |
| 2009 | Gunners (1) | Dynamos | No cup held |
| 2010 | Motor Action (1) | Dynamos | No cup held |
| 2011 | Dynamos (18)^{†} | FC Platinum | Dynamos (9)^{†}^{[F]} |
| 2012 | Dynamos (19)^{†} | Highlanders | Dynamos (10)^{†} |
| 2013 | Dynamos (20) | Highlanders | Highlanders (3) |
| 2014 | Dynamos (21) | ZPC Kariba | FC Platinum (1) |
| 2015 | Chicken Inn (1) | Dynamos | Harare City (1) |
| 2016 | CAPS United (5) | FC Platinum | Ngezi Platinum (1) |
| 2017 | FC Platinum (1) | Dynamos | Harare City (2) |
| 2018 | FC Platinum (2) | Ngezi Platinum | Triangle United (1) |
| 2019 | FC Platinum (3) | Chicken Inn | Highlanders (4) |
| 2020 | Cancelled due to COVID-19 pandemic | | |
| 2021–22 | FC Platinum (4) | Chicken Inn | Bulawayo Chiefs |
| 2023 | Ngezi Platinum (1) | Manica Diamonds | Dynamos (11) |
| 2024 | Simba Bhora (1) | F.C. Platinum | Dynamos (12) |
| 2025 | Scottland (1) | MWOS | Dynamos (13) |

== Total titles won ==
| Club | Winners | Runners-up | Winning seasons |
|---|---|---|---|
| Dynamos | 21 | 9 | 1963, 1965, 1970, 1976, 1978, 1980, 1981, 1982, 1983, 1985, 1986, 1989, 1991, 1994, 1995, 1997, 2007, 2011, 2012, 2013, 2014 |
| Highlanders | 7 | 8 | 1990, 1993, 1998–99, 2000, 2001, 2002, 2006 |
| CAPS United | 5 | 3 | 1979, 1996, 2004, 2005, 2016 |
| F.C. Platinum | 4 | 2 | 2017, 2018, 2019, 2021–22 |
| Black Rhinos | 2 | 2 | 1984, 1987 |
| Bulawayo Rovers | 2 | 1 | 1962, 1964 |
| Bulawayo Sables | 2 | – | 1968, 1969 |
| Chibuku Shumba/State House Tornados | 2 | – | |
| Salisbury Sables | 2 | – | 1972, 1974 |
| Zimbabwe Saints | 2 | 2 | 1977, 1988 |
| Arcadia United | 1 | – | 1971 |
| Amazulu | 1 | 2 | 2003 |
| Black Aces | 1 | – | 1992 |
| Chicken Inn | 1 | 2 | 2015 |
| Gunners | 1 | – | 2009 |
| Metal Box | 1 | – | 1973 |
| Monomotapa United | 1 | – | 2008 |
| Motor Action | 1 | 1 | 2006 |
| Ngezi Platinum | 1 | 1 | 2023 |
| Simba Bhora | 1 | – | 2024 |
| Scottland | 1 | – | 2025 |
| Rio Tinto | – | 2 | |
| Manica Diamonds | – | 1 | |
| MWOS | – | 1 | |
| ZPC Kariba | – | 1 | |

== References and notes ==
Notes

A Dynamos Salisbury City and Salisbury United amalgamated to form Dynamos Fc
B (also sometimes referred to Salisbury Tornados) retitled themselves Chibuku Shumba between the 1967 and 1968 seasons.
C Black Aces were founded in 1976 as a new incarnation of Chibuku Shumba when that club folded in 1975.
D Chapungu United won the 1995 Cup of Zimbabwe by walkover after the semi-final match between Highlanders and CAPS United was declared void due to the fielding by Highlanders of an ineligible player. Left with no opposing team in the final round, Chapungu took the cup by default.
E Motor Action were formed in 2000, taking the place of Blackpool in the Premier Soccer League by buying that team's franchise.
F The Mbada Diamonds Cup was launched in 2011, with the 16 teams from the Zimbabwe Premier Soccer League participating. The winner will qualify for the CAF Confederation Cup.

General references

- League records sourced to: Sharuko, Robson (23 July 2011). "Show Me Your Colour". The Herald. Government of Zimbabwe.
  - and: Schöggl, Hans (6 September 2011). "Zimbabwe (and Rhodesia) Champions". Rec.Sport.Soccer Statistics Foundation.
- Cup records sourced to: Schöggl, Hans (23 April 2010). "Zimbabwe (and Rhodesia) Cup Winners". Rec.Sport.Soccer Statistics Foundation.
