= 2026 Zimbabwe Premier Soccer League =

Zimbabwe Premier Soccer League
- Season: 2026
- Dates: 6 March – TBC

The 2026 Zimbabwe Premier Soccer League is the 45th season of the Zimbabwe Premier Soccer League, the top-tier football league in Zimbabwe.

Scottland are the defending champions, after winning their first ever title in 2025.

== Teams ==
=== Proposed format change ===
In November 2025, following the conclusion of the season, the PSL proposed expanding the league to 20 teams, with relegation being cancelled for the 2025 season, and a temporary 22 teams in the 2026 season. The proposal was rejected by the Zimbabwe Football Association.

=== Changes from 2025 ===
▲ Promoted from Division One	▼ Relegated to Division One
Hardrock (Central Region); Agama (Northern Region); Bulawayo Chiefs (Southern Region); FC Hunters (Eastern Region)	Bikita Minerals; Green Fuel; Yadah; Kwekwe

== Corruption ==
In October 2026, an official affiliated with Scottland attempted to bribe CAPS player Washington Arubi before their upcoming game. Champions Scottland trailed Hardrock by eight points, with two games in hand, at the time. Arubi rejected the bribery attempt.

== Standings ==
Pos	Team	Pld	W	D	L	GF	GA	GD	Pts	Qualification or relegation
1	Hardrock	32	21	6	5	57	21	+36	69	Possible CAF Champions League qualification
2	Scottland	30	17	10	3	45	11	+34	61	
3	Ngezi Platinum Stars	32	14	14	4	39	26	+13	56	
4	Dynamos	32	12	16	4	41	24	+17	52	
5	CAPS United	31	13	12	6	36	25	+11	51	
6	Herentals	32	14	6	12	32	33	−1	48	
7	MWOS	32	11	12	9	34	25	+9	45	
8	Highlanders	32	9	17	6	27	23	+4	44	
9	Platinum	32	9	16	7	22	22	0	43	
10	Chicken Inn	31	11	10	10	23	24	−1	43	
11	Simba Bhora	32	9	12	11	31	33	−2	39	
12	FC Hunters	32	8	14	10	28	37	−9	38	
13	Bulawayo Chiefs	32	8	10	14	26	37	−11	34	
14	Kariba	32	6	15	11	18	27	−9	33	
15	Agama United	32	8	7	17	22	42	−20	31	Relegation to Division One
16	Triangle United	32	6	8	18	23	39	−16	26	Relegation to Division One
17	TelOne	32	4	10	18	24	48	−24	22	Relegation to Division One
18	Manica Diamonds	32	4	9	19	14	45	−31	21	Relegation to Division One

Updated to match(es) played on 26 October 2026. Source:
Rules for classification: 1) Points; 2) Goal difference; 3) Goals scored
