= 2019 Zimbabwe Premier Soccer League =

Zimbabwe Premier Soccer League
- Season: 2019
- Average attendance: 406,247 spectators over 306 matches average 1,327 each.

The 2019 Zimbabwe Premier Soccer League will be the 40th season of the Zimbabwe Premier Soccer League, the top-tier football in Zimbabwe. The season will start on 30 March 2019.

== Teams ==
The league will consist of the top 14 teams from the 2018 Zimbabwe Premier Soccer League and four promoted sides, Hwange F.C., Manica Diamonds F.C., TelOne F.C, and Mushowani Stars F.C.

== League table ==
Pos	Team	Pld	W	D	L	GF	GA	GD	Pts	Qualification or relegation
1	FC Platinum (C)	34	17	11	6	34	15	+19	62	Qualification for 2020–21 CAF Champions League
2	Chicken Inn	34	17	8	9	49	28	+21	59	
3	CAPS United	34	17	7	10	53	42	+11	58	
4	Ngezi Platinum Stars	34	12	13	9	28	23	+5	49	
5	Manica Diamonds	34	12	11	11	35	33	+2	47	
6	Highlanders (Q)	34	10	16	8	30	26	+4	46	Qualification for 2020–21 CAF Confederation Cup (Note: Highlanders are Cup of Zimbabwe winners.)
7	Triangle United	34	13	7	14	44	43	+1	46	
8	ZPC Kariba	34	12	10	12	29	31	−2	46	
9	Dynamos	34	9	17	8	28	28	0	44	
10	Black Rhinos	34	11	11	12	26	30	−4	44	
11	Herentals	34	8	17	9	31	34	−3	41	
12	Harare City	34	11	8	15	35	39	−4	41	
13	Bulawayo Chiefs	34	11	8	15	33	44	−11	41	
14	Yadah	34	10	11	13	34	46	−12	41	
15	Chapungu United (R)	34	9	13	12	32	33	−1	40	Relegation
16	TelOne (R)	34	8	16	10	32	35	−3	40	Relegation
17	Hwange (R)	34	8	13	13	30	40	−10	37	Relegation
18	Mushowani Stars (R)	34	8	9	17	36	49	−13	33	Relegation

Source: PSL
Rules for classification: 1) points; 2) goal difference; 3) goals scored; 4) head-to-head points; 5) head-to-head goal difference; 6) head-to-head goals scored; 7) playoff.
(C) Champions; (Q) Qualified for the phase indicated; (R) Relegated
