= Zimbabwe Division One =

Second Division
- Country: Zimbabwe
- Confederation: CAF
- Promotion to: Zimbabwe Premier Soccer League
- Domestic cup(s): NetOne Charity Shield; BancABC Super8 Cup; Mbada Diamonds Cup; Zimbabwean Independence Trophy
- International cup(s): Champions League; Confederation Cup
- Website: www.footballzone.co.zw

Zimbabwe Division One is the second-highest tier of Zimbabwean football and is organized by the Zimbabwe Football Association.

As of 2024, it consists of the Central Region, covering Matebeleland South and Midlands, the Eastern Region, covering Manicaland, Mashonaland East and Masvingo, the Northern Region, covering Mashonaland Central and Mashonaland West, and the Southern Region, covering Bulawayo and Matebeleland North.

The winners of each region are promoted to the Zimbabwe Premier Soccer League.

== List of champions ==
Season	Northern Region	Southern Region
1980	Bulawayo Wanderers	Hippo Valley
1981		
1982		
1983	Black Rhinos	Wankie
1984		
1985		
1986		
1987		
1988		Wankie
1989	Tanganda	
1990		
1991	Black Aces	Shushine
1992	Fire Batteries	Ziscosteel
1993	Blackpool	Rufaro Rovers
1994	Grain Tigers	Lancashire Steel
1995	Blue Swallows	Ziscosteel
1996	Air Zimbabwe Jets	Amazulu
1997	Black Rhinos	United Railstars
1998–99	Eiffel Flats	Masvingo United
2000	Circle Cement	Shabanie Mine

Season	Northern Region	Southern Region	Eastern Region
2001	Sporting Lions	Chrome Stars	Buymore
2002	Kambuzuma United	Njube Sundowns	Blue Swallows
2003	Eiffel Flats	Railstars	Masvingo United
2004	Monomatapa United	Chapungu United	Buymore
2005	Mwana Africa	Zimbabwe Saints	Davison Chemicals
2006	Lengthens	Njube Sundowns	Eastern Lions
2007	Gunners	Underhill	Kiglon
2008	Black Rhinos	Hwange	Highway
2009	Douglas Warriors	Shabanie Mine	Victoria Masvingo

Season	Northern Region	Southern Region	Eastern Region	Central Region
2010	Blue Ribbon	Chicken Inn	Zimanzi Masvingo	Mimosa
2011	Harare City	Quelaton	Buffaloes	Hardbody
2012	Black Rhinos	How Mine	Triangle United	Triple B
2013	ZPC Kariba	Plumtree Chiefs	Chiredzi	Chapungu United
2014	Flame Lilly	Tsholotsho Pirates	Dongo Sawmills	Wha Wha
2015	Ngezi Platinum	Bulawayo City	Mutare City Rovers	Border Strikers
2016	Black Rhinos	Bantu Rovers	Yadah Stars	Shabanie Mine
2017	Herentals	Bulawayo Chiefs	Mutare City Rovers	Nichrut
2018	Mushowani Stars	Hwange	Manica Diamonds	TelOne
2019	Cranborne Bullets	Bulawayo City	Tenax	Wha Wha
2020	Not held due to the COVID-19 pandemic in Zimbabwe			
2021	Not held due to the COVID-19 pandemic in Zimbabwe			
2022	Simba Bhora	Hwange	Green Fuel	Sheasham
2023	Chegutu Pirates	Arenel Movers	Bikita Minerals	TelOne
2024	Scottland	ZPC Hwange	Triangle United	Kwekwe United
2025	Agama	Bulawayo Chiefs	Hunters	Hardrock

== See also ==
- Zimbabwe Premier Soccer League
- Cup of Zimbabwe
