= 2017 CAPS United F.C. season =

CAPS United F.C.
2017 season

The 2017 season was CAPS United F.C.'s 12th season in the Zimbabwe Premier Soccer League.

== Transfers ==
=== In ===
No.	Pos.	Nat.	Name	Age	Moving from	Type	Transfer window	Ends	Transfer fee	Source
	CB	(Zimbabwe)	Sithole Last	26	Platinum (Zimbabwe)	Transfer	January	Undisclosed	Undisclosed	

=== Out ===
No.	Pos.	Nat.	Name	Age	Moving to	Type	Transfer window	Transfer fee	Source
2	CB	(Zimbabwe)	Stephen Makatuka	28	AmaZulu (South Africa)	Transfer	January	Undisclosed	

== Squad ==
Squad No.	Name	Nationality	Position(s)	Date of Birth (Age)	App	Goals
Goalkeepers
1	Edmore Sibanda	(Zimbabwe)	GK	January 2, 1987 (age 39)	0	0
Defenders
	Sithole Last	(Zimbabwe)	CB	September 5, 1990 (age 36)	0	0

== Competitions ==
=== Zimbabwe Premier Soccer League ===
Pos	Team	Pld	W	D	L	GF	GA	GD	Pts	Qualification or relegation
1	Platinum	34	20	12	2	40	15	+25	72	2018 CAF Champions League
2	Dynamos	34	21	7	6	55	26	+29	70	
3	Ngezi Platinum	34	19	8	7	54	30	+24	65	
4	Chicken Inn	34	18	7	9	34	22	+12	61	
5	CAPS United	34	15	13	6	43	29	+14	58	
6	Highlanders	34	13	8	13	35	35	0	47	
7	Black Rhinos	34	12	10	12	35	30	+5	46	
8	How Mine	34	13	7	14	30	36	−6	46	
9	Triangle United	34	11	12	11	37	36	+1	45	
10	Kariba	34	12	9	13	30	32	−2	45	
11	Chapungu United	34	11	11	12	25	27	−2	44	
12	Shabanie Mine	34	10	12	12	29	34	−5	42	
13	Yadah	34	10	10	14	31	40	−9	40	
14	Bulawayo City	34	11	6	17	37	44	−7	39	
15	Harare City	34	10	8	16	29	29	0	38	
16	Hwange	34	10	7	17	29	38	−9	37	Relegation to 2018 Zimbabwe Division 1
17	Tsholotsho	34	4	13	17	19	44	−25	25	Relegation to 2018 Zimbabwe Division 1
18	Bantu Rovers	34	4	4	26	28	73	−45	16	Relegation to 2018 Zimbabwe Division 1

Updated to match(es) played on 30 July 2017. Source: Soccerway.com
Rules for classification: 1) points; 2) goal difference; 3) goals scored; 4) head-to-head points; 5) head-to-head goal difference; 6) head-to-head goals scored; 7) head-to-head away goals.

==== Results summary ====
Overall								Home						Away					
Pld	W	D	L	GF	GA	GD	Pts	W	D	L	GF	GA	GD	W	D	L	GF	GA	GD
2	1	1	0	2	1	+1	4	1	0	0	2	1	+1	0	1	0	0	0	0

Source: Match reports

==== Results by round ====
Round	1	2	3	4	5	6	7	8	9	10	11	12	13	14	15	16	17	18	19	20	21	22	23	24	25	26	27	28	29	30	31	32	33	34
Ground	A	H	A	H	A	H	A	H	A	H	A	H	A	H	A	A	H	H	A	H	A	H	A	H	A	H	A	H	A	H	A	H	H	A
Result	D	W	D	D	W	D	W	L	L	D	L	L	W	D																				

Source: Match reports
A = Away; H = Home; W = Win; D = Draw; L = Loss

==== Matches ====
April 2 1	Shabanie Mine F.C.	0–0	CAPS United F.C.	Zvishavane, Zimbabwe
5:00PM		Report		Stadium: Maglas Stadium

April 9 2	CAPS United F.C.	2–1	Harare City F.C.	Harare, Zimbabwe
5:00PM		Report		Stadium: National Sports Stadium

April 15 3	Kariba	v	CAPS United F.C.	Kariba, Zimbabwe
5:00PM		Report		Stadium: Nyamhunga Stadium
