= 2017 Zimbabwe Premier Soccer League =

Zimbabwe Premier Soccer League
- Season: 2017
- Champions: Platinum
- Relegated: Hwange; Tsholotsho; Bantu Rovers
- Matches: 77
- Goals: 137 (1.78 per match)
- Top goalscorer: Bukhosi Sibanda (7)
- Biggest home win: Bantu Rovers 7-2 Yadah (6 May 2017)
- Biggest away win: Bantu Rovers 0-5 Chicken Inn (1 April 2017)
- Highest scoring: Bantu Rovers 7-2 Yadah (6 May 2017)
- Longest winning run: How Mine; Kariba (4)
- Longest unbeaten run: Platinum (9)
- Longest winless run: Tsholotsho (9)
- Longest losing run: Tsholotsho (5)
- All statistics correct as of 21 May 2017.

The 2017 Zimbabwe Premier Soccer League is the 38th season of top-tier football in Zimbabwe. The season begins on 1 April 2017. CAPS United are the defending champions, coming off their fifth league title (including one in the Rhodesia National Football League).

== Teams ==
The league expanded to 18 for the 2017 season, with 14 sides returning from the 2016 season and four promoted from the 2016 Zimbabwe Division 1, Bantu Rovers, Black Rhinos, Shabanie Mine and Yadah. On the other hand, Mutare City and Border Strikers finished as the bottom two teams of the 2016 season and will play in the Zimbabwe Division 1 for the 2017 season. CAPS United are the defending champions from the 2016 season.

=== Stadiums and locations ===
Locations of the 2016 Zimbabwe Premier Soccer League teams

Team	Home city	Stadium	Capacity	2016 season
Bantu Rovers	Bulawayo	Barbourfields Stadium	32,000	Zimbabwe Division 1
Black Rhinos	Harare	Gwanzura	10,000	Zimbabwe Division 1
Bulawayo City	Bulawayo	Barbourfields Stadium	32,000	8th in Premier League
CAPS United	Harare	National Sports Stadium	60,000	Premier League Champions
Chapungu United	Gweru	Ascot Stadium	5,000	13th in Premier League
Chicken Inn	Bulawayo	Luveve Stadium	8,000	4th in Premier League
Dynamos	Harare	Rufaro Stadium	35,000	5th in Premier League
Harare City	Harare	Rufaro Stadium	35,000	9th in Premier League
Highlanders	Bulawayo	Barbourfields Stadium	32,000	3rd in Premier League
How Mine	Bulawayo	Luveve Stadium	8,000	10th in Premier League
Hwange	Hwange	Colliery Stadium	15,000	12th in Premier League
Kariba	Kariba	Nyamhunga Stadium	5,000	6th in Premier League
Ngezi Platinum	Ngezi	Baobab Stadium	1,000	7th in Premier League
Platinum	Zvishavane	Mandava Stadium	3,000	2nd in Premier League
Shabanie Mine	Zvishavane	Maglas Stadium	5,000	Zimbabwe Division 1
Triangle United	Triangle	Gibbo Stadium	3,000	11th in Premier League
Tsholotsho	Bulawayo	Barbourfields Stadium	32,000	14th in Premier League
Yadah	Chitungwiza	Chibuku Stadium	3,000	Zimbabwe Division 1

== Results ==
=== League table ===
Pos	Team	Pld	W	D	L	GF	GA	GD	Pts	Qualification or relegation
1	Platinum	34	20	12	2	40	15	+25	72	2018 CAF Champions League
2	Dynamos	34	21	7	6	55	26	+29	70	
3	Ngezi Platinum	34	19	8	7	54	30	+24	65	
4	Chicken Inn	34	18	7	9	34	22	+12	61	
5	CAPS United	34	15	13	6	43	29	+14	58	
6	Highlanders	34	13	8	13	35	35	0	47	
7	Black Rhinos	34	12	10	12	35	30	+5	46	
8	How Mine	34	13	7	14	30	36	−6	46	
9	Triangle United	34	11	12	11	37	36	+1	45	
10	Kariba	34	12	9	13	30	32	−2	45	
11	Chapungu United	34	11	11	12	25	27	−2	44	
12	Shabanie Mine	34	10	12	12	29	34	−5	42	
13	Yadah	34	10	10	14	31	40	−9	40	
14	Bulawayo City	34	11	6	17	37	44	−7	39	
15	Harare City	34	10	8	16	29	29	0	38	
16	Hwange	34	10	7	17	29	38	−9	37	Relegation to 2018 Zimbabwe Division 1
17	Tsholotsho	34	4	13	17	19	44	−25	25	Relegation to 2018 Zimbabwe Division 1
18	Bantu Rovers	34	4	4	26	28	73	−45	16	Relegation to 2018 Zimbabwe Division 1

Updated to match(es) played on 30 July 2017. Source: Soccerway.com
Rules for classification: 1) points; 2) goal difference; 3) goals scored; 4) head-to-head points; 5) head-to-head goal difference; 6) head-to-head goals scored; 7) head-to-head away goals.

=== Result table ===
All teams play in a double round robin system (home and away).

Home \ Away	BAN	BLA	BUL	CAP	CHA	CHI	DYN	HAR	HIG	HOW	HWA	KAR	NGE	PLA	SHA	TRI	TSH	YAD
Bantu Rovers			0–0		0–1	0–5		0–2	1–2		2–3			0–1		1–0	1–1	7–2
Black Rhinos	3–0				1–0			1–2	3–0		3–0			0–0			3–0	1–0
Bulawayo City		0–1				2–1				0–1	1–0			1–1		1–2		3–0
CAPS United	3–0				4–0			2–1									1–1	
Chapungu United		3–0	1–0			2–0		1–0	0–0		1–2					0–0	2–0	1–1
Chicken Inn		0–1	1–0				0–0			0–1		2–0	0–0	0–1	1–0			
Dynamos	2–0	0–1	4–3							0–1		3–1	3–2	0–1	1–1	2–1		
Harare City			0–0	3–2		0–1	0–1		0–0		1–1	0–1	0–1			2–0		0–0
Highlanders			2–0			0–1					3–0	3–2	1–0		0–1	2–0		1–0
How Mine	1–0	2–1			2–1			2–1	0–0					0–0			1–1	2–1
Hwange						0–1	0–1			0–0		0–1	0–3		2–0	0–0		
Kariba	3–1	1–1	2–0	2–1	0–0					1–0				0–0	2–1		2–0	0–0
Ngezi Platinum	2–2	1–0	3–2	2–2	0–0					2–0	4–1	2–1		2–1	1–0			
Platinum	3–2				1–0						1–0					0–0		2–0
Shabanie Mine			0–2	0–0	0–0			0–0	0–2								1–0	
Triangle United		1–1				0–1	2–2			2–0			1–0					
Tsholotsho			1–2					0–1	1–2	1–1	0–0							0–0
Yadah						0–1	0–1					1–0	1–0		0–2			

Updated to match(es) played on 21 May 2017. Source: soccerway.com
Legend: Blue = home team win; Yellow = draw; Red = away team win.

== Positions by round ==
Team ╲ Round	1	2	3	4	5	6	7	8	9	10	11	12	13	14	15	16	17	18	19	20	21	22	23	24	25	26	27	28	29	30	31	32	33	34
Black Rhinos	14	8	10	6	2	3	6	3	1																									
Ngezi Platinum	3	1	1	1	1	2	1	1	2																									
Platinum	3	2	2	3	5	7	5	6	3																									
Kariba	3	8	10	14	11	8	4	2	4																									
Highlanders	2	7	9	7	3	1	2	5	5																									
How Mine	14	14	18	12	7	4	3	4	6																									
Chicken Inn	1	6	8	5	9	6	8	7	7																									
Triangle United	6	11	14	17	16	14	13	11	8																									
Bulawayo City	17	10	3	4	6	10	10	12	9																									
Shabanie Mine	6	4	6	9	12	11	11	9	10																									
CAPS United	6	3	5	8	10	5	7	8	11																									
Yadah	6	4	4	2	4	9	9	10	12																									
Dynamos	14	13	15	10	13	12	12	14	13																									
Hwange	6	17	7	13	8	13	14	13	14																									
Harare City	6	14	16	16	15	16	15	15	15																									
Chapungu United	6	16	17	18	18	18	18	18	16																									
Bantu Rovers	18	18	13	15	17	17	16	16	17																									
Tsholotsho	6	12	10	11	13	15	17	17	18																									

Leader
Relegation to Zimbabwe Division 1

Updated to match(es) played on 21 May 2017. Source: Soccerway

== Season statistics ==
=== Goals ===
==== Top scorers ====
As of 21 May 2017

Rank	Player	Team	Goals
1	(Zimbabwe) Bukhosi Sibanda	Bantu Rovers	7
2	(Zimbabwe) Abbas Amidu	CAPS United	4
2	(Zimbabwe) Prince Dube	Highlanders	4
4	(Zimbabwe) Daniel Chakupe	Kariba	3
4	(Zimbabwe) Raphael Manuvire	Kariba	3
4	(Zimbabwe) Mkhululi Moyo	Bulawayo City	3
4	(Zimbabwe) Lameck Nhamo	Triangle United	3
8	(Zimbabwe) Qadr Amin	Ngezi Platinum	2
8	(Zimbabwe) Toto Banda	How Mine	2
8	(Zimbabwe) Talent Chamboko	Kariba	2
8	(Zimbabwe) Rodwell Chinyengetere	Platinum	2
8	(Zimbabwe) Nomore Chinyerere	Hwange	2
8	(Zimbabwe) Mkhokheli Dube	Bulawayo City	2
8	(Zimbabwe) Terrence Dzvukamanja	Ngezi Platinum	2
8	(Zimbabwe) Milton Kureva	Black Rhinos	2
8	(Zimbabwe) Ishmael Lawe	Chicken Inn	2
8	(Zimbabwe) Sydney Linyama	Black Rhinos	2
8	(Zimbabwe) Emmanuel Mandiranga	Dynamos	2
8	(Zimbabwe) Nelson Maziwisa	Shabanie Mine	2
8	(Zimbabwe) Winston Mhango	Platinum	2
8	(Zimbabwe) Innocent Mucheneka	Chicken Inn	2
8	(Zimbabwe) Ronald Mudimu	Triangle United	2
8	(Zimbabwe) Simon Munawa	Highlanders	2
8	(Zimbabwe) Morris Musiyakuvi	Yadah	2
8	(Zimbabwe) Ronald Pfumbidzai	CAPS United	2
8	(Zimbabwe) Tafadzwa Rusike	CAPS United	2
8	(Zimbabwe) Newman Sianchali	Bantu Rovers	2
8	(Zimbabwe) Charles Sibanda	Platinum	2
8	(Zimbabwe) Donald Teguru	Ngezi Platinum	2
8	(Zimbabwe) Francisco Zekumbawire	Kariba	2

==== Hat-tricks ====
Player	For	Against	Result	Date
Bukhosi Sibanda	Bantu Rovers	Yadah	7-2	6 May 2017
