= List of stadiums in Zimbabwe =

This is a list of sports stadiums in Zimbabwe, ranked in descending order of capacity. Stadiums in Zimbabwe with a capacity of 10,000 or more are included, even though the list is incomplete.

== Current stadiums ==
#	Image	Stadium	Capacity	City	Home team(s)
1		National Sports Stadium	60,000	Harare	Zimbabwe national football team CAPS United F.C.
2		Rufaro Stadium	60,000	Harare	CAPS United; Dynamos; Herentals; Scottland
3		Barbourfields Stadium	22,995 (all-seated); 40,000 (standing)	Bulawayo	Highlanders FC
4		Sakubva Stadium	20,000	Mutare	Manica Diamonds
5		Mandava Stadium	15,000	Zvishavane	F.C. Platinum
6		Chahwanda Stadium	15,000	Kwekwe	Under construction
7		Harare Sports Club	10,000	Harare	Mashonaland Eagles
8		Queens Sports Club	9,000	Bulawayo	Matabeleland Tuskers
9		Bata Stadium	8,000	Gweru	TelOne
10		Luveve Stadium	8,000	Bulawayo	Chicken Inn
11		Ngoni Stadium	7,000	Norton	MWOS
12		Baghdad Stadium	5,000	Kwekwe	
13		Green Fuel Arena	5,000	Chisumbanje	Green Fuel
14		Baobab Stadium	2,000	Ngezi	Ngezi Platinum

== See also ==
- List of African stadiums by capacity
- Lists of stadiums
