= 2018 Zimbabwe Premier Soccer League =

Zimbabwe Premier Soccer League
- Season: 2018
- Average attendance: 442,880 spectators over 306 matches average 1,447 each.

The 2018 Zimbabwe Premier Soccer League is the 39th season of top-tier football in Zimbabwe. The season was initially scheduled to begin on 10 March 2018, but was postponed to 17 March 2018. Herentals College, Bulawayo Chiefs, Nichrut F.C., and Mutare City Rovers were all promoted before the start of the season. The average attendance for a game in the 2018 Zimbabwe Premier Soccer League was 1,447.

== Standings ==
Pos	Team	Pld	W	D	L	GF	GA	GD	Pts
1	Platinum	34	24	6	4	52	14	+38	78
2	Ngezi Platinum	34	20	5	9	50	24	+26	65
3	Chicken Inn	34	15	12	7	42	26	+16	57
4	Triangle United	34	17	5	12	43	33	+10	56
5	Highlanders	34	14	9	11	34	30	+4	51
6	Herentals College	34	13	12	9	28	24	+4	51
7	Black Rhinos	34	12	13	9	38	30	+8	49
8	CAPS United	34	12	12	10	34	30	+4	48
9	Harare City	34	10	18	6	28	26	+2	48
10	Kariba	34	12	13	9	28	26	+2	46 (Note: Kariba 3 points deducted)
11	Dynamos	34	10	12	12	28	37	−9	42
12	Yadah Stars	34	9	14	11	33	40	−7	41
13	Bulawayo Chiefs	34	9	12	13	29	35	−6	39
14	Chapungu United	34	9	12	13	27	34	−7	39
15	Nichrut FC	34	9	9	16	33	40	−7	36
16	Bulawayo City	34	9	5	20	33	43	−10	32
17	Mutare City Rovers	34	5	8	21	24	55	−31	23
18	Shabanie Mine	34	2	13	19	24	61	−37	19
