= 2024 Zimbabwe Premier Soccer League =

Zimbabwe Premier Soccer League
- Season: 2024
- Dates: 9 March – 24 November
- Champions: Simba Bhora (1st title)
- Relegated: Arenel Movers; Chegutu Pirates; Bulawayo Chiefs; Hwange
- Champions League: Simba Bhora

The 2024 Zimbabwe Premier Soccer League was the 43rd season of the Zimbabwe Premier Soccer League, the top-tier football league in Zimbabwe.

Ngezi Platinum were the defending champions. Simba Bhora won their first ever title with two games to spare.

== Teams ==
=== Changes from 2023 ===
Black Rhinos, Triangle United, Sheasham, and Cranborne Bullets were all relegated from the 2023 Zimbabwe Premier Soccer League.

TelOne won the Central Region to make their return to the top flight. Chegutu Pirates and Arenel Movers won the Northern and Southern region to make their first-ever appearance in top flight football. In the Eastern Region, Tenax were initially crowned champions but Bikita Minerals were awarded three points after the last match of the season. Legal action ensued and ZIFA nullified Bikita's promotion, and the season started with only 17 teams as a result.

▲ Promoted from Division One	▼ Relegated to Division One
TelOne (Central Region); Chegutu Pirates (Northern Region); Arenel Movers (Southern Region); Bikita Minerals (Eastern Region)	Black Rhinos; Triangle United; Sheasham; Cranborne Bullets

=== Locations ===
Location of teams in the 2024 Zimbabwe Premier Soccer League.

== League table ==
Pos	Team	Pld	W	D	L	GF	GA	GD	Pts	Qualification or relegation
1	Simba Bhora (C)	34	20	6	8	39	24	+15	66	Possible CAF Champions League qualification
2	Platinum	34	17	10	7	44	25	+19	61	
3	Ngezi Platinum Stars	34	14	15	5	46	23	+23	57	
4	Manica Diamonds	34	14	12	8	27	19	+8	54	
5	Herentals	34	12	13	9	29	29	0	49	
6	Highlanders	34	12	12	10	42	33	+9	48	
7	Chicken Inn	34	11	14	9	26	22	+4	47	
8	Dynamos	34	10	16	8	29	26	+3	46	
9	CAPS United	34	12	9	13	38	39	−1	45	
10	TelOne	34	9	15	10	34	32	+2	42	
11	Yadah	34	10	12	12	37	38	−1	42	
12	Green Fuel	34	10	12	12	27	36	−9	42	
13	Kariba	34	7	20	7	17	18	−1	41	
14	Bikita Minerals	34	8	14	12	27	36	−9	38	
15	Bulawayo Chiefs (R)	34	7	15	12	23	30	−7	36	Relegation to Division One
16	Hwange (R)	34	8	11	15	24	42	−18	35	Relegation to Division One
17	Chegutu Pirates (R)	34	8	9	17	23	37	−14	33	Relegation to Division One
18	Arenel Movers (R)	34	4	11	19	20	43	−23	23	Relegation to Division One

Source: Zimbabwe Premier Soccer League
Rules for classification: 1) Points; 2) Goal difference; 3) Goals scored
(C) Champions; (R) Relegated
