= 2015 Zimbabwe Premier Soccer League =

Zimbabwe Premier Soccer League
- Season: 2015
- Champions: Chicken Inn
- Relegated: Buffaloes; Dongo; Flame Lily; Wha Wha
- 2016 CAF Champions League: Chicken Inn
- 2016 CAF Confederation Cup: Harare City
- Matches: 240
- Goals: 500 (2.08 per match)
- Top goalscorer: Knox Mutizwa (14)
- Biggest home win: 2 matches: How Mine 6-0 Wha Wha (2 May 2015); Triangle United 6-0 Wha Wha (10 May 2015)
- Biggest away win: How Mine 1-5 Highlanders (16 August 2015)
- Highest scoring: 2 matches: Triangle United 5-2 Hwange (22 March 2015); Kariba 5-2 Buffaloes (3 April 2015)
- Longest winning run: Chicken Inn (5)
- Longest unbeaten run: Platinum (21)
- Longest winless run: How Mine (14)
- Longest losing run: Dongo (6)
- All statistics correct as of 28 November 2015.

The 2015 Zimbabwe Premier Soccer League is the 36th season of top-tier football in Zimbabwe. The season began on 21 March 2015 and concluded on 28 November 2015 with Chicken Inn F.C. winning their first league title, snapping a run of four straight titles by Dynamos F.C.

Dongo Sawmills, Flame Lilly and Wha Wha - all newcomers to the league - were relegated to the 2016 Zimbabwe Division 1, along with Buffaloes F.C. as they each finished in the bottom four positions in the league table.

== Attendances ==
Highlanders F.C. drew the highest average home attendance: 7,276.

== Teams ==
A total of 16 teams contested the league, including 12 sides from the 2014 season and four promoted from the 2014 Zimbabwe Division 1, Dongo Sawmills FC, Flame Lilly FC, Tsholotsho FC and Wha Wha. Black Rhinos F.C., Shabanie Mine F.C., Bantu Rovers F.C. and Chiredzi FC were relegated from the 2014 season to the Zimbabwe Division 1. Dynamos F.C. are the defending champions from the 2014 season.

=== Stadiums and locations ===
Locations of the 2014 Zimbabwe Premier Soccer League teams

Team	Home city	Stadium	Capacity	2013 season
Buffaloes F.C.	Mutare	Sakubva Stadium	10,000	10th in Premier League
CAPS United F.C.	Harare	National Sports Stadium	60,000	3rd in Premier League
Chapungu United F.C.	Gweru	Ascot Stadium	5,000	12th in Premier League
Chicken Inn F.C.	Bulawayo	Luveve Stadium	8,000	6th in Premier League
Dongo Sawmills FC	Rusape	Vengere Stadium	10,000	Zimbabwe Division 1
Dynamos F.C.	Harare	Rufaro Stadium	35,000	Premier League Champions
Flame Lilly F.C.	Harare	Chikurubi Prison Grounds		Zimbabwe Division 1
Harare City F.C.	Harare	Rufaro Stadium	35,000	11th in Premier League
Highlanders F.C.	Bulawayo	Barbourfields Stadium	32,000	5th in Premier League
How Mine FC	Bulawayo	White City Stadium	20,000	8th in Premier League
Hwange Colliery F.C.	Hwange	Colliery Stadium	15,000	7th in Premier League
ZPC Kariba	Harare	Gwanzura	10,000	2nd in Premier League
FC Platinum	Zvishavane	Mandava Stadium	3,000	4th in Premier League
Triangle United	Chiredzi	Gibbo Stadium	3,000	9th in Premier League
Tsholotsho FC	Bulawayo	White City Stadium	20,000	Zimbabwe Division 1
Wha Wha	Gweru	Ascot Stadium	5,000	Zimbabwe Division 1

== League table ==
Pos	Team	Pld	W	D	L	GF	GA	GD	Pts	Qualification or relegation
1	Chicken Inn (C, Q)	30	18	7	5	45	23	+22	61	2016 CAF Champions League
2	Dynamos	30	15	12	3	36	20	+16	57	
3	Platinum	30	15	10	5	52	23	+29	55	
4	Triangle United	30	13	10	7	46	25	+21	49	
5	CAPS United	30	11	13	6	29	23	+6	46	
6	Highlanders	30	11	8	11	37	31	+6	41	
7	Harare City (Q)	30	8	15	7	29	27	+2	39	2016 CAF Confederation Cup
8	Hwange	30	9	12	9	32	32	0	39	
9	Chapungu United	30	9	12	9	26	27	−1	39	
10	Kariba	30	9	11	10	40	37	+3	38	
11	How Mine	30	8	11	11	28	34	−6	35	
12	Tsholotsho	30	6	13	11	20	30	−10	31	
13	Buffaloes (R)	30	6	11	13	23	41	−18	29	Relegation to 2016 Zimbabwe Division 1
14	Flame Lilly (R)	30	4	14	12	24	35	−11	26	Relegation to 2016 Zimbabwe Division 1
15	Wha Wha (R)	30	4	11	15	17	51	−34	23	Relegation to 2016 Zimbabwe Division 1
16	Dongo (R)	30	4	10	16	18	43	−25	22	Relegation to 2016 Zimbabwe Division 1

Updated to match(es) played on 28 November 2015. Source: FIFA.com
Rules for classification: 1) points; 2) goal difference; 3) goals scored; 4) head-to-head points; 5) head-to-head goal difference; 6) head-to-head goals scored; 7) head-to-head away goals
(C) Champions; (Q) Qualified for the phase indicated; (R) Relegated

== Results ==
All teams play in a double round robin system (home and away).

Home \ Away	BUF	CAP	CHA	CHI	DON	DYN	FLA	HAR	HIG	HOW	HWA	KAR	PLA	TRI	TSH	WHA
Buffaloes		0–0	2–2	0–2	1–0	0–1	2–0	2–1	0–0	1–1	0–1	2–1	0–3	1–1	1–1	3–0
CAPS United	0–0		0–2	2–0	0–0	1–1	0–0	0–1	3–1	3–0	0–0	1–1	1–0	1–1	1–1	3–1
Chapungu United	4–1	2–1		1–2	3–0	0–1	1–0	1–1	1–1	0–0	0–0	2–1	0–0	0–0	2–1	1–1
Chicken Inn	3–0	0–0	2–0		3–0	0–1	2–1	3–1	2–1	1–0	0–1	2–1	1–1	0–0	1–0	2–0
Dongo	0–1	0–2	0–0	1–1		1–2	0–0	0–3	0–1	1–2	0–1	1–4	1–1	0–1	2–0	1–0
Dynamos	3–0	1–1	2–0	0–3	1–0		1–0	0–0	3–2	1–0	0–0	2–1	1–0	1–1	0–0	5–1
Flame Lilly	2–0	0–1	2–1	1–2	1–2	1–1		0–0	0–3	1–1	2–2	0–1	1–1	1–0	2–2	1–1
Harare City	1–1	0–0	2–0	2–0	2–0	0–0	2–2		1–0	2–2	1–1	2–1	2–1	0–0	0–1	1–1
Highlanders	1–0	0–1	0–1	2–3	2–0	1–1	1–0	1–1		1–1	1–0	0–1	1–2	1–1	2–1	2–0
How Mine	1–0	3–0	0–0	1–2	0–1	0–1	0–0	0–0	1–5		2–1	2–1	0–3	0–0	1–0	6–0
Hwange	0–0	0–1	1–0	1–0	2–2	1–1	2–0	1–0	2–4	2–0		3–3	1–1	1–2	0–1	3–0
Kariba	5–2	2–1	1–1	1–1	1–1	1–1	1–1	2–0	2–0	1–1	2–2		0–3	1–2	0–1	2–1
Platinum	4–1	1–1	2–0	1–3	2–2	3–1	3–0	2–0	2–2	3–0	2–0	0–0		3–2	3–0	3–0
Triangle United	2–1	4–0	3–0	1–2	5–1	0–2	0–3	3–1	0–0	1–2	5–2	1–0	0–1		2–0	6–0
Tsholotsho	0–0	0–2	0–1	1–1	1–1	1–1	1–1	1–1	0–1	2–1	1–1	0–0	0–0	0–2		1–0
Whawha	1–1	1–2	0–0	1–1	0–0	1–0	1–1	1–1	1–0	0–0	1–0	1–2	2–1	0–0	0–2	

Updated to match(es) played on 28 November 2015. Source: soccerway.com
Legend: Blue = home team win; Yellow = draw; Red = away team win.

== Positions by round ==
Leader
Relegation to Zimbabwe Division 1

Team ╲ Round	1	2	3	4	5	6	7	8	9	10	11	12	13	14	15	16	17	18	19	20	21	22	23	24	25	26	27	28	29	30
Chicken Inn	4	8	5	3	3	1	1	1	2	1	1	1	1	1	1	1	1	1	1	1	1	1	1	1	1	1	1	1	1	1
Dynamos	2	1	1	2	2	2	3	3	3	3	3	2	3	3	3	4	4	3	3	3	2	3	3	3	3	3	3	3	3	2
Platinum	8	13	8	8	11	13	11	9	10	9	7	8	9	6	7	5	5	4	4	4	3	2	2	2	2	2	2	2	2	3
Triangle United	1	3	2	1	1	3	2	2	1	2	4	3	2	2	2	2	2	2	2	2	4	4	4	4	4	4	4	4	4	4
CAPS United	4	2	7	7	10	10	5	8	8	10	8	6	7	8	5	6	7	7	7	7	7	7	6	5	5	6	5	5	5	5
Highlanders	14	9	6	6	8	4	7	4	6	8	6	7	8	9	9	9	9	8	8	8	10	10	10	10	10	11	9	6	6	6
Harare City	13	6	9	9	6	7	8	6	7	7	10	9	6	7	8	7	6	5	5	5	5	5	5	6	6	7	7	7	8	7
Hwange	15	15	13	12	12	14	13	14	11	11	11	11	12	12	12	11	10	10	10	9	8	8	9	8	7	5	6	8	7	8
Chapungu United	9	14	15	16	9	9	9	7	5	4	2	5	5	5	6	8	8	9	9	10	9	9	7	7	8	8	8	9	9	9
Kariba	3	4	3	5	5	5	6	10	9	6	9	10	10	10	11	10	11	12	11	11	11	12	12	11	11	9	10	10	10	10
How Mine	9	5	4	4	4	6	4	5	4	5	5	4	4	4	4	3	3	6	6	6	6	6	8	9	9	10	11	11	11	11
Tsholotsho	6	7	10	10	7	8	10	11	13	12	13	14	14	14	13	13	12	13	12	13	14	13	13	13	13	12	12	12	12	12
Buffaloes	16	16	16	14	13	15	14	12	12	14	12	12	11	11	10	12	13	11	13	14	12	11	11	12	12	13	13	13	13	13
Flame Lilly	11	12	14	13	16	12	12	15	15	13	14	15	15	15	14	14	14	15	14	12	13	14	14	15	14	14	14	14	14	14
Wha Wha	11	11	11	11	15	11	15	13	14	15	15	13	13	13	15	15	15	14	15	15	15	15	15	14	15	15	15	15	15	15
Dongo	7	10	12	15	14	16	16	16	16	16	16	16	16	16	16	16	16	16	16	16	16	16	16	16	16	16	16	16	16	16

Updated to match(es) played on 28 November 2015. Source: Soccerway (in French)

== Season statistics ==
=== Scoring ===
==== Top scorers ====
As of 28 November 2015

Rank	Player	Team	Goals
1	(Zimbabwe) Knox Mutizwa	Highlanders	14
2	(Zimbabwe) Dominic Chungwa	CAPS United	12
3	(Zimbabwe) Edmore Chirambadare	Chicken Inn	11
4	(Zimbabwe) Raphael Manuvire	Kariba	10
5	(Zimbabwe) Brian Muzondiwa	Platinum	9
6	(Zimbabwe) Hillary Bakacheza	Triangle United	8
6	(Zimbabwe) Limited Chikafa	Kariba	8
6	(Zambia) Obrey Chirwa	Platinum	8
6	(Zimbabwe) Tineyi Chitora	Chapungu United	8
6	(Zimbabwe) Mitchell Katsvairo	Chicken Inn	8

==== Hat-tricks ====
Player	For	Against	Result	Date
Timothy January^{4}	How Mine	Wha Wha	6-0	2 May 2015
Brian Muzondiwa	Platinum	Buffaloes	0-3	26 July 2015
Tawanda Muyendi	Triangle United	Dongo	5-1	8 November 2015
Dominic Chungwa	CAPS United	How Mine	3-0	18 November 2015

^{4} Player scored 4 goals.

=== Scoring ===
- First goal of the season: Simba Gorogodyo for Tsholotsho against Harare City (20 March 2015)

Promoted:

Ngezi Platinum (Selous) (winners Northern Region Division One)
Bulawayo City (winners Southern Region Division One)
Border Strikers (Beitbridge) (winners Central Region Division One)
Mutare City (winners Eastern Region Division One)
