= 2013 Zimbabwe Premier Soccer League =

Zimbabwe Premier Soccer League
- Season: 2013
- Matches: 240
- Goals: 570 (2.38 per match)
- Highest attendance: Dynamos F.C. with 16,508

The 2013 Zimbabwe Premier Soccer League season (known as the Castle Larger Premier Soccer League for sponsorship reasons) was the thirty third season of the Zimbabwe Premier Soccer League since its establishment in 1980. The season began on 28 March 2013.

Dynamos are the defending champions, having won the previous 2012 Zimbabwe Premier Soccer League season. The season will feature 12 teams from the 2012 ZPSL season and four new teams promoted from the 2012 Zifa Division One League: How Mine, Triangle United F.C., Triple B and Black Rhinos who replace relegated Buffaloes F.C., Harare City, Hardbody and Quelaton.

== Teams ==
A total of 16 teams will contest the league, including 12 sides from the 2012 season and four promoted from the 2012 Zifa Division One League.

=== Stadiums and locations ===
Football teams in Zimbabwe tend to use multiple stadiums over the course of a season for their home games. The following table will only indicate the stadium used most often by the club for their home games

Team	City	Home venue	Capacity
Black Mambas	Harare	Morris Depot Police Camp	5,000
Black Rhinos	Harare	Rufaro Stadium	60,000
Buffaloes	Mutare	Sakubva Stadium	10,000
CAPS United	Harare	National Sports Stadium	80,000
Chicken Inn	Bulawayo	Luveve Stadium	8,000
Dynamos	Harare	Rufaro Stadium	60,000
FC Platinum	Zvishavane	Mandava Stadium	10,000
Harare City	Harare	Rufaro Stadium	60,000
Highlanders	Bulawayo	Barbourfields Stadium	40,000
How Mine	Bulawayo	White City Stadium	20,000
Hwange	Hwange	Colliery Stadium	15,000
Monomotapa United	Harare	Gwanzura Stadium	10,000
Motor Action	Harare	Motor Action Sports Club	1,000
Shabanie Mine	Zvishavane	Maglas Stadium	5,000
Triangle United F.C.	Chiredzi	Gibbo Stadium	3,000
Triple B	Beitbridge	Dulibadzimu Stadium	4,000

Location of teams in the 2012 ZPSL.

== League table ==
Pos	Team	Pld	W	D	L	GF	GA	GD	Pts	Qualification or relegation
1	Dynamos	30	14	12	4	43	22	+21	54	Qualification for 2014 CAF Champions League
2	Highlanders	30	16	6	8	45	27	+18	54	
3	Harare City	30	14	12	4	43	25	+18	54	
4	FC Platinum	30	14	8	8	40	29	+11	50	
5	CAPS United	30	14	7	9	42	34	+8	49	
6	Chicken Inn	30	12	8	10	41	35	+6	44	
7	How Mine	30	12	7	11	28	32	−4	43	
8	Triangle United F.C.	30	11	9	10	43	36	+7	42	
9	Hwange	30	11	8	11	36	30	+6	41	
10	Black Mambas	30	10	10	10	33	35	−2	40	
11	Shabanie Mine	30	11	7	12	33	38	−5	40	
12	Buffaloes	30	11	6	13	40	43	−3	39	
13	Black Rhinos	30	11	5	14	34	39	−5	38	Relegation to Zifa Division One League
14	Monomotapa United	30	6	8	16	25	47	−22	26	Relegation to Zifa Division One League
15	Motor Action	30	3	11	16	17	37	−20	20	Relegation to Zifa Division One League
16	Triple B	30	4	8	18	27	61	−34	20	Relegation to Zifa Division One League

Updated to match(es) played on unknown. Source: rsssf.com
Rules for classification: 1) points; 2) goal difference; 3) number of goals scored.
