= 2023 Zimbabwe Premier Soccer League =

Zimbabwe Premier Soccer League
- Season: 2023
- Dates: 18 March – 26 November
- Champions: Ngezi Platinum (1st title)
- Relegated: Black Rhinos; Triangle United; Sheasham; Cranborne Bullets
- Champions League: Ngezi Platinum
- Confederation Cup: Dynamos
- Matches: 306
- Goals: 567 (1.85 per match)
- Biggest home win: Yadah 6–0 Kariba
- Average attendance: 509,996 spectators over 306 matches average 1,667 each.

The 2023 Zimbabwe Premier Soccer League was the 42nd season of the Zimbabwe Premier Soccer League, the top-tier football league in Zimbabwe.

Ngezi Platinum won their first-ever title in November 2023 after a 90th minute goal defeated Simba Bhora with two matchdays to spare.

Black Rhinos, Triangle United, Sheasham, and Cranborne Bullets were all relegated to the Division One, with 14th-placed Yadah winning against third-placed Dynamos on their final match day to ensure survival.

== Changes from 2021–22 ==
Green Fuel, Simba Bhora, Hwange, and Sheasham were all promoted from the Division One.

== League table ==
Pos	Team	Pld	W	D	L	GF	GA	GD	Pts	Qualification or relegation
1	Ngezi Platinum (C)	34	20	6	8	45	23	+22	66	Qualification to CAF Champions League
2	Manica Diamonds	34	16	10	8	42	23	+19	58	
3	Dynamos FC	34	15	12	7	37	16	+21	57	Qualification to CAF Confederation Cup (Note: Dynamos qualified for the Confederation Cup as the 2024 Cup of Zimbabwe winners.)
4	FC Platinum	34	15	10	9	37	29	+8	55	
5	Highlanders FC	34	14	13	7	24	22	+2	55	
6	Herentals	34	14	9	11	38	33	+5	51	
7	Chicken Inn	34	11	16	7	35	26	+9	49	
8	CAPS United	34	11	13	10	37	32	+5	46	
9	Hwange Colliery	34	12	9	13	27	27	0	45	
10	Green Fuel	34	11	10	13	27	34	−7	43	
11	ZPC Kariba	34	11	8	15	27	48	−21	41	
12	Simba Bhora	34	9	13	12	29	27	+2	40	
13	Bulawayo Chiefs	34	10	10	14	37	39	−2	40	
14	Yadah	34	12	4	18	35	46	−11	40	
15	Black Rhinos (R)	34	9	11	14	27	37	−10	38	Relegation to Division One
16	Triangle United (R)	34	6	17	11	24	36	−12	35	Relegation to Division One
17	Sheasham (R)	34	7	14	13	23	36	−13	35	Relegation to Division One
18	Cranborne Bullets (R)	34	6	9	19	16	33	−17	27	Relegation to Division One

Source: soccerway.com
Rules for classification: 1) points; 2) goal difference; 3) number of goals scored.
(C) Champions; (R) Relegated

== Attendances ==
#	Football club	Average attendance
1	Highlanders FC	9,034
2	Dynamos FC	6,236
3	Simba Bhora	4,668
4	CAPS United	2,067
5	FC Platinum	1,262
6	ZPC Kariba	1,162
7	Chicken Inn FC	936
8	Green Fuel	908
9	Triangle United	740
10	Yadah FC	590
11	Ngezi Platinum	467
12	Bulawayo Chiefs	456
13	Sheasham FC	351
14	Black Rhinos	304
15	Manica Diamonds	249
16	Herentals	238
17	Hwange Colliery	203
18	Cranborne Bullets	134
Average per club		1,667
