= Denver Mukamba =

Zimbabwean footballer (born 1992)

Personal information
- Full name: Denver Nigel Mukamba
- Date of birth: 21 December 1992 (age 33)
- Place of birth: Harare, Zimbabwe
- Height: 1.80 m (5 ft 11 in)
- Position: Midfielder

Team information
- Current team: Dynamos F.C.
- Number: 10

Youth career
- DC Academy F.C.

Senior career*
Years	Team	Apps	(Gls)
2011	Kiglon		
2011–2013	Dynamos		
2013–2015	Bidvest Wits	9	(0)
2014–2015	→ University of Pretoria (loan)	18	(3)
2015–2016	Jomo Cosmos	13	(1)
2016–2018	Dynamos	18	(8)
2018	→ CAPS United (loan)		
2019	Manica Diamonds		
2019	Chapungu United		
2020–2022	Ngezi Platinum		
2023-	Dynamos F.C.		

International career^{‡}
2011	Zimbabwe U23		
2011–	Zimbabwe	8	(1)
- * Club domestic league appearances and goals as of 17 March 2019 ‡ National team caps and goals as of 2 July 2016

Denver Mukamba (born 21 December 1992) is a Zimbabwean footballer, who currently plays for Zimbabwe Premier Soccer League side Dynamos F.C. and the Zimbabwe national team.

== Career ==
=== Club ===
Mukamba's professional career began with Kiglon, from Kiglon he went on to join Dynamos in 2011 where he won two Zimbabwe Premier Soccer Leagues, two Mbada Diamonds Cups and one Soccer Star of the Year award. He also had a trial with Maritzburg United. At the start of 2013 he left Dynamos and Zimbabwe behind to sign for South African club Bidvest Wits. He made just 9 league appearances for the club over two seasons, this was partly due to him being loaned out for the 2014-15 season to the University of Pretoria.

For Tuks, he made 20 appearances and scored 3 goals in all competitions before returning to Bidvest. Upon returning to Bidvest, Mukamba was immediately signed by Jomo Cosmos. His debut for Jomo came on 13 September 2014 in a home defeat to Platinum Stars. After 14 appearances and 2 goals in all competitions in 2015–16, Mukamba was released by Jomo and subsequently signed by former club Dynamos. In 2018, Mukamba was loaned out to Caps United after having some problems with his Coach Lloyd Mutasa. Mukamba was then frozen out at Dynamos by Lloyd Mutasa, leading to the loan deal.

In January 2019, Mukamba joined Manica Diamonds. He then moved to Chapungu United in the summer 2019, before joining Ngezi Platinum in January 2020.

January 2023, Denver returned to Dynamos where he is currently playing.

=== International ===
Mukamba has won 8 caps for the Zimbabwe national team, with his debut coming in 2011 versus South Africa. His first international goal came in 2013 in a 2–1 friendly win versus Botswana. He played in five of Zimbabwe's 2014 FIFA World Cup qualification matches. Before playing for the senior side, Mukamba played for the Zimbabwe U23s.

== Career statistics ==
=== International ===
As of 2 July 2016.

National team	Year	Apps	Goals
Zimbabwe	2011	1	0
Zimbabwe	2012	2	0
Zimbabwe	2013	5	1
Zimbabwe	2016	0	0
Total		8	1

=== International goals ===
As of 2 July 2016. Scores and results list Zimbabwe's goal tally first.

Goal	Date	Venue	Opponent	Score	Result	Competition
1	6 February 2013	Rufaro Stadium, Harare, Zimbabwe	Botswana	2–1	2–1	Friendly

== Honours ==
=== Club ===
Dynamos

- Zimbabwe Premier Soccer League (2): 2011, 2012,
- Mbada Diamonds Cup (2): 2011, 2012

=== Individual ===
- Soccer Star of the Year (1): 2012
