= Thandolwenkosi Ngwenya =

Zimbabwean footballer

Personal information
- Full name: Thandolwenkosi Methuseli Ngwenya
- Date of birth: 19 December 2002 (age 23)
- Place of birth: Bulawayo, Zimbabwe
- Height: 1.80 m (5 ft 11 in)
- Position: Striker

Team information
- Current team: AmaZulu
- Number: 23

Youth career
- BN Academy
- –2021: F.C. Platinum

Senior career*
Years	Team	Apps	(Gls)
2021–2025	F.C. Platinum		
2025–	AmaZulu	25	(15)

International career^{‡}
2018	Zimbabwe U17		
2024–2025	Zimbabwe U23	5	(2)
2025–	Zimbabwe	4	(1)
- * Club domestic league appearances and goals as of 16 November 2026 ‡ National team caps and goals as of 16 November 2026

Thandolwenkosi Methuseli Ngwenya (born 19 December 2002) is a Zimbabwean footballer who plays as a striker for South African Premiership club AmaZulu and the Zimbabwe national team.

== Early life ==
Ngwenya was born on 19 December 2002 in Bulawayo. His father played football in Botswana. His mother took him to BN Academy and helped provide him with football equipment. He attended Masase Primary School in Mberengwa. After attending Mnene High School, a scholarship with F.C. Platinum brought him to Guinea Fowl High School in Gweru.

== Club career ==
Ngwenya began his professional career with the Zvishavane-based club F.C. Platinum in the Zimbabwe Premier Soccer League in 2021 under manager Norman Mapeza. His professional debut for the club was on 22 May 2021 as a substitute in the first round of the Chibuku Super Cup against WhaWha, in which he scored the sixth goal in a 6–0 win. F.C. Platinum later won the 2021 Chibuku Super Cup with Ngwenya making seven appearances and scoring two goals in the tournament. He scored 10 goals in the league in his breakthrough season in which F.C. Platinum won the league title. Ngwenya scored scored seven goals in the 2023 season. In 2024, he was limited by injuries and scored four goals in 10 appearances. In his final season with F.C. Platinum, Ngwenya scored nine goals before leaving the club mid-season and still ended up as the top scorer. Ngwenya scored a brace against ZPC Kariba on 14 June 2025 and scored a goal in his final game for F.C. Platinum in a 1–1 draw on 28 June 2025 against Simba Bhora, later winning the Zimbabwean Premier Soccer League Player of the Month for June 2025 after he left the club to join AmaZulu.

In July 2025, Ngwenya signed with AmaZulu and scored six goals in his first season before suffering an injury, but still ended the season as the top scorer of the team. At the start of the 2026–27 South African Premiership season, Ngwenya began a streak of scoring in seven consecutive matches, equaling a record previously held by only Grant Young and Essau Kanyenda.

== International career ==
Ngwenya was selected in the Zimbabwe national under-17 football team squad for the 2018 COSAFA Under-17 Championship held in Mauritius.

Ngwenya made his first appearance for the Zimbabwe national under-23 football team, composed of domestic players, during 2024 African Nations Championship qualification against Eswatini. In 2025, Ngwenya was called up to the Zimbabwe national under-23 football team for the 2025 COSAFA Cup. He scored a brace against Mozambique on 10 June 2025.

Ngwenya made his senior international debut for the Zimbabwe national team in a 0–1 loss to Rwanda on 9 September 2025 during 2026 FIFA World Cup qualification. In 2026, he was called up by Ramón Catalá for the 2027 Africa Cup of Nations qualification matches against Sierra Leone and the Democratic Republic of the Congo. He scored his first goal for the Zimbabwe national team against Equatorial Guinea on 16 November 2026.

== Career statistics ==
=== Club ===
As of match played 8 November 2026

Appearances by club, season and competition
Club	Season	League			National Cup (Note: Includes the Chibuku Super Cup and Nedbank Cup.)		Knockout Cup		Continental (Note: Includes CAF Champions League.)		MTN 8		Total	
Club	Season	Division	Apps	Goals	Apps	Goals	Apps	Goals	Apps	Goals	Apps	Goals	Apps	Goals
F.C. Platinum	2021–22	Zimbabwe Premier Soccer League	[data missing]	10	7	2	–		0	0	—		[data missing]	12
F.C. Platinum	2023	Zimbabwe Premier Soccer League	[data missing]	7	[data missing]	[data missing]	–		—		—		[data missing]	[data missing]
F.C. Platinum	2024	Zimbabwe Premier Soccer League	10	4	[data missing]	[data missing]	–		—		—		[data missing]	[data missing]
F.C. Platinum	2025	Zimbabwe Premier Soccer League	18	9	[data missing]	[data missing]	–		–		–		[data missing]	[data missing]
F.C. Platinum	Total		[data missing]	30	[data missing]	[data missing]	–		0	0	–		[data missing]	[data missing]
AmaZulu	2025–26	South African Premiership	16	6	2	1	1	0	–		0	0	19	7
AmaZulu	2026–27	South African Premiership	9	9	0	0	2	0	–		1	2	12	11
AmaZulu	Total		25	15	2	1	3	0	–		1	2	31	18
Career total			[data missing]	45	[data missing]	[data missing]	3	0	0	0	1	2	[data missing]	[data missing]

=== International ===
As of match played 16 November 2026

Appearances and goals by national team and year
National team	Year	Apps	Goals
Zimbabwe
Zimbabwe	2025	1	0
Zimbabwe	2026	3	1
Total		4	1

Scores and results list Zimbabwe's goal tally first, score column indicates score after each Ngwenya goal.

List of international goals scored by Thandolwenkosi Ngwenya
No.	Date	Venue	Cap	Opponent	Score	Result	Competition
1.	16 November 2026	National Sports Stadium, Harare, Zimbabwe	4	Equatorial Guinea	1–0	3–0	2027 Africa Cup of Nations qualification

== Honors ==
=== FC Platinum ===
- Chibuku Super Cup: 2021
- Zimbabwe Premier Soccer League: 2021–22

=== Individual ===
- Zimbabwe Premier Soccer League Player of the Month: May 2022; June 2025
- South African Premiership Player of the Month: August 2026
