= Takabva Mawaya =

Zimbabwean footballer (born 1993)

Personal information
- Date of birth: 2 February 1993 (age 33)
- Place of birth: Kwekwe, Zimbabwe
- Position: Goalkeeper

Team information
- Current team: Bulawayo Chiefs

Senior career*
Years	Team	Apps	(Gls)
2013–2016	Hwange		
2016–2017	ZPC Kariba		
2017	Ngezi Platinum		
2017–2020	ZPC Kariba		
2020–2022	Triangle United		
2022–	Bulawayo Chiefs		

International career^{‡}
2017	Zimbabwe	2	(0)
- * Club domestic league appearances and goals ‡ National team caps and goals as of 17 February 2019

Takabva Mawaya (born 2 February 1993) is a Zimbabwean footballer who plays as a goalkeeper for Bulawayo Chiefs and the Zimbabwe national football team.

== Career ==
=== Club ===
Mawaya began his club career with Hwange Colliery, appearing for the team for several years before leaving in 2016 as part of a mass exodus from the club. He joined ZPC Kariba where he played for five years, albeit interrupted by a single season at Ngezi Platinum. In 2020, he moved to Triangle United, stating that he viewed the club as a new beginning for his career. In February 2022, he joined Bulawayo Chiefs.

=== International ===
In January 2017, Mawaya received his first call-up to the Zimbabwe national team ahead of the 2017 Africa Cup of Nations. In June, he made his senior international debut, registering a clean sheet in Zimbabwe's 6–0 victory over Seychelles during the group stages of the 2017 COSAFA Cup.

== Career statistics ==
=== International ===
As of matches played 18 January 2022.

National team	Year	Apps	Goals
Zimbabwe	2017	2	0
Total		2	0
