= 2012 Zimbabwe Premier Soccer League =

Zimbabwe Premier Soccer League
- Season: 2012
- Champions: Dynamos
- Relegated: Gunners; Blue Rangers; Hardbody; Quelaton
- Champions League: Dynamos
- Highest attendance: 28,886 during Dynamos versus Highlanders

The 2012 Zimbabwe Premier Soccer League season (known as the Castle Larger Premier Soccer League for sponsorship reasons) will be the thirty second season of the Zimbabwe Premier Soccer League since its establishment in 1980. The season began on 31 March 2012.

Dynamos are the defending champions, having won the previous 2011 Zimbabwe Premier Soccer League season. The season will feature 12 teams from the 2011 ZPSL season and four new teams promoted from the 2011 Zifa Division One League: Buffaloes, Harare City, Hardbody and Quelaton who replace relegated Kiglon, Masvingo United, Shooting Stars and Zimbabwe Saints.

== Teams ==
A total of 16 teams will contest the league, including 12 sides from the 2011 season and four promoted from the 2011 Zifa Division One League.

=== Stadiums and locations ===
Football teams in South Africa tend to use multiple stadiums over the course of a season for their home games. The following table will only indicate the stadium used most often by the club for their home games

Team	City	Home venue	Capacity
Black Mambas	Harare	Morris Depot Police Camp	5,000
Blue Rangers	Harare	Gwanzura Stadium	10,000
Buffaloes	Mutare	Sakubva Stadium	10,000
CAPS United	Harare	National Sports Stadium	80,000
Chicken Inn	Bulawayo	Luveve Stadium	8,000
Dynamos	Harare	Rufaro Stadium	60,000
FC Platinum	Zvishavane	Mandava Stadium	10,000
Gunners	Mabvuku	Lafarge Stadium	10,000
Harare City	Harare	Rufaro Stadium	60,000
Hardbody	Gweru	Ascot Stadium	5,000
Highlanders	Bulawayo	Barbourfields Stadium	40,000
Hwange	Hwange	Colliery Stadium	15,000
Monomotapa United	Harare	Gwanzura Stadium	10,000
Motor Action	Harare	Motor Action Sports Club	1,000
Quelaton	Bulawayo	Luveve Stadium	8,000
Shabanie Mine	Zvishavane	Maglas Stadium	5,000

Location of teams in the 2012 ZPSL.

== League table ==
Pos	Team	Pld	W	D	L	GF	GA	GD	Pts	Qualification or relegation
1	Dynamos (C)	30	21	6	3	58	15	+43	69	Qualification for 2013 CAF Champions League
2	Highlanders (Note: Highlanders could not represent Zimbabwe in the 2013 CAF Champions League as they were subject of a three-year ban for withdrawing from the 2011 CAF Confederation Cup.)	30	20	9	1	49	15	+34	69	
3	Chicken Inn	30	13	10	7	39	23	+16	49	
4	Monomotapa United	30	15	5	10	42	33	+9	50	
5	Shabanie Mine	30	12	10	8	35	30	+5	46	
6	Buffaloes	30	11	11	8	25	24	+1	44	
7	FC Platinum	30	12	7	11	40	39	+1	43	
8	Motor Action	30	12	6	12	35	28	+7	42	
9	Harare City	30	9	13	8	24	24	0	40	
10	CAPS United	30	10	9	11	28	30	−2	39	
11	Hwange	30	10	6	14	49	47	+2	36	
12	Black Mambas	30	9	7	14	34	42	−8	34	
13	Gunners (R)	30	10	4	16	27	36	−9	34	Relegation to Zifa Division One League
14	Blue Rangers (R)	30	6	7	17	30	64	−34	25	Relegation to Zifa Division One League
15	Hardbody (R)	30	6	6	18	26	48	−22	24	Relegation to Zifa Division One League
16	Quelaton (R)	30	3	5	22	15	58	−43	11 (Note: Quelaton deducted 3 points)	Relegation to Zifa Division One League

Updated to match(es) played on 18 November 2012. Source: fifa.com
Rules for classification: 1) points; 2) goal difference; 3) number of goals scored.
(C) Champions; (R) Relegated
Notes:
- No team from Zimbabwe entered the 2013 CAF Confederation Cup.
