= Thabani Kamusoko =

Zimbabwean footballer (born 1988)

Personal information
- Full name: Thabani Michael Kamusoko
- Date of birth: 2 March 1988 (age 38)
- Height: 1.76 m (5 ft 9 in)
- Position: Midfielder

Team information
- Current team: Triangle United F.C

Senior career*
Years	Team	Apps	(Gls)
2007–2008	Njube Sundowns		
2009	Underhill		
2010	Dynamos		
2011–2015	Platinum		
2015–2019	Young Africans		
2019–2022	ZESCO United		
2022–	Nkana		

International career^{‡}
2009–	Zimbabwe	11	(0)
- * Club domestic league appearances and goals ‡ National team caps and goals as of 26 June 2019

Thabani Scara Kamusoko (born 2 March 1988) is a Zimbabwean footballer who plays for Triangle United F.C. in the Zimbabwe Premier Soccer League. He was playing for Zambia Super League club ZESCO United and Young Africans in Tanzania.

== International career ==
Kamusoko made his Zimbabwe national team debut on 11 February 2009 in a friendly against Tanzania.

He was selected for the 2019 Africa Cup of Nations squad.
