= Richard Hachiro =

Zimbabwean footballer (born 1998)

Personal information
- Date of birth: 27 January 1998 (age 28)
- Place of birth: Bulawayo, Zimbabwe
- Position: Midfielder

Team information
- Current team: CAPS

Senior career*
Years	Team	Apps	(Gls)
2017–2019	Herentals		
2020–	CAPS		

International career^{‡}
2018–	Zimbabwe	6	(0)
- * Club domestic league appearances and goals ‡ National team caps and goals as of 25 March 2021

Richard Hachiro (born 27 January 1998) is a Zimbabwean footballer who plays as a midfielder for CAPS and the Zimbabwe national football team.

== Career ==
=== Club ===
Hachiro began his senior club career with Herentals F.C. in 2017. In February 2020, Hachiro moved to CAPS United for an undisclosed fee.

=== International ===
Hachiro made his senior international debut on 18 April 2018, coming on as a 47th-minute substitute for Winston Mhango in a 1-0 friendly defeat to Botswana.

== Career statistics ==
=== International ===
As of matches played 16 January 2021.

National team	Year	Apps	Goals
Zimbabwe	2018	3	0
Zimbabwe	2019	2	0
Zimbabwe	2021	1	0
Total		6	0
