= Norman Njelele =

Zimbabwean footballer (1984-2017)

Personal information
- Date of birth: 27 August 1984
- Place of birth: Harare, Zimbabwe
- Date of death: 26 November 2017 (aged 33)
- Position: Defender

Senior career*
Years	Team	Apps	(Gls)
2005	Black Rhinos		
2006–2008	Hwange		
2009–2012	Motor Action		
2013–2015	Hwange		

International career^{‡}
2009	Zimbabwe	1	(0)
- * Club domestic league appearances and goals as of 13 November 2020 ‡ National team caps and goals as of 13 November 2020

Norman Njelele (27 August 1984 – 26 November 2017) was a Zimbabwean football defender.
