= 2025 Zimbabwe Premier Soccer League =

Zimbabwe Premier Soccer League
- Season: 2025
- Dates: 28 February – 23 November
- Champions: Scottland

The 2025 Zimbabwe Premier Soccer League was the 44th season of the Zimbabwe Premier Soccer League, the top-tier football league in Zimbabwe.

Simba Bhora were the defending champions, after winning their first ever title in 2024.

The season began with concern over the poor quality of pitches.

The league was won by Scottland with two games to spare in their debut season in the top tier.

Scottland earned US$100,000 for winning the league.

== Teams ==
=== Changes from 2024 ===
Arenel Movers, Chegutu Pirates, Bulawayo Chiefs and Hwange were all relegated from the 2024 Zimbabwe Premier Soccer League.

▲ Promoted from Division One	▼ Relegated to Division One
Kwekwe United (Central Region); Scottland (Northern Region); ZPC Hwange (Southern Region); Triangle United (Eastern Region)	Arenel Movers; Chegutu Pirates; Bulawayo Chiefs; Hwange

ZPC Hwange chose not to compete due to financial constraints and restrictions on a single entity owning two teams in the same league. Their franchise was purchased by MWOS, who will compete instead.

=== Locations ===
Location of teams in the 2025 Zimbabwe Premier Soccer League.

== League table ==
Pos	Team	Pld	W	D	L	GF	GA	GD	Pts	Qualification or relegation
1	Scottland (C, Q)	34	20	9	5	47	20	+27	69	Possible CAF Champions League qualification
2	MWOS	34	17	11	6	36	23	+13	62	
3	Simba Bhora	34	16	13	5	37	21	+16	61	
4	Ngezi Platinum Stars	34	14	13	7	41	30	+11	55	
5	TelOne	34	14	12	8	40	26	+14	54	
6	Platinum	34	10	19	5	28	20	+8	49	
7	Herentals	34	12	12	10	29	26	+3	48	
8	Kariba	34	9	17	8	29	26	+3	44	
9	CAPS United	34	11	10	13	26	28	−2	43	
10	Manica Diamonds	34	8	17	9	21	24	−3	41	
11	Highlanders	34	7	18	9	29	28	+1	39	
12	Chicken Inn	34	9	12	13	23	25	−2	39	
13	Dynamos	34	8	15	11	20	26	−6	39	
14	Triangle United	34	8	14	12	36	33	+3	38	
15	Green Fuel (R)	34	7	16	11	28	30	−2	37	Relegation to Division One
16	Bikita Minerals (R)	34	9	10	15	25	38	−13	37	Relegation to Division One
17	Yadah (R)	34	8	11	15	23	30	−7	35	Relegation to Division One
18	Kwekwe United (R)	34	1	7	26	15	79	−64	10	Relegation to Division One

Source: Zimbabwe Premier Soccer League
Rules for classification: 1) Points; 2) Goal difference; 3) Goals scored
(C) Champions; (Q) Qualified for the phase indicated; (R) Relegated

== Attendances ==
Highlanders versus Dynamos saw an attendance of 15,794 spectators. Another match with a high attendance was CAPS United versus Scottland, with 10,995.

== Proposed format change ==
In November 2025, following the conclusion of the season, the PSL proposed expanding the league to 20 teams, with relegation being cancelled for the 2025 season, and a temporary 22 teams in the 2026 season. The proposal was rejected by the Zimbabwe Football Association.
