= Nelson Mazivisa =

Zimbabwean footballer (born 1985)

Personal information
- Full name: Nelson Mazivisa
- Date of birth: 7 September 1985 (age 41)
- Place of birth: Bulawayo, Zimbabwe
- Position: Forward

Team information
- Current team: Triangle United

Senior career*
Years	Team	Apps	(Gls)
2011–2016	Platinum		
2012	→ Shabanie Mine (loan)		
2016–	Triangle United		

International career^{‡}
2010–	Zimbabwe	8	(4)
- * Club domestic league appearances and goals as of 27 June 2016 ‡ National team caps and goals as of 27 June 2016

Nelson Mazivisa is a Zimbabwean professional footballer, who plays as a forward for Triangle United and the Zimbabwe national team.

== Career ==
=== Club ===
Mazivisa's career began in Zvishavane with Platinum, he stayed with Platinum for five years up until 2016 when he left following the expiration of his contract. During his time with Platinum, Mazivisa was loaned out to Shabanie Mine in 2012. His spell with the aforementioned club was a success as he finished the season as the Zimbabwe Premier Soccer League top goalscorer. Upon his return to Platinum he went on trial to two South African teams, firstly to Chippa United and then to SuperSport United but he failed to win a contract with either side. After leaving Platinum, Mazivisa completed a move to Triangle United.

=== International ===
In January 2014, coach Ian Gorowa, invited him to be a part of the Zimbabwe squad for the 2014 African Nations Championship. He helped the team to a fourth-place finish after being defeated by Nigeria by a goal to nil. In total, Mazivisa has scored 4 goals in 8 caps for his nation.

== Career statistics ==
=== International ===
As of 27 June 2016.

National team	Year	Apps	Goals
Zimbabwe	2010	0	0
Zimbabwe	2011	0	0
Zimbabwe	2012	2	2
Zimbabwe	2013	2	2
Zimbabwe	2014	4	0
Zimbabwe	2015	0	0
Zimbabwe	2016	0	0
Total		8	4

=== International goals ===
As of 27 June 2016. Scores and results list Zimbabwe's goal tally first.

Goal	Date	Venue	Opponent	Score	Result	Competition
1	17 July 2012	Molopololole Sports Complex, Molepolole, Botswana	Lesotho	2–2	5–3	Three Nations Tournament
2	17 July 2012	Molopololole Sports Complex, Molepolole, Botswana	Lesotho	3–2	5–3	Three Nations Tournament
3	28 July 2013	Stade George V, Curepipe, Mauritius	Mauritius	1–0	3–0	2014 African Nations Championship qualification
4	28 July 2013	Stade George V, Curepipe, Mauritius	Mauritius	3–0	3–0	2014 African Nations Championship qualification

== Honours ==
=== Club ===
Platinum

- Zimbabwean Independence Trophy (2): 2012, 2014
- Cup of Zimbabwe (1): 2014
