= Chegutu Pirates F.C. =

Zimbabwean football club

Chegutu Pirates
- League: Zimbabwe Division 1
- 2024 PSL: 17th (relegated)

Chegutu Pirates is a Zimbabwean football club from Chegutu, Chegutu District, Mashonaland West Province, that competes in the Northern Region Soccer League.

The club was promoted to the top tier Zimbabwe Premier Soccer League for the first time, after four decades of trying, winning the Northern Region Soccer League in 2023, and joining Ngezi Platinum and ZPC Kariba as the third team from Mashonaland West in the 2024 PSL.

They struggled in their first season, experiencing pre-season difficulties, finishing 17th, and were relegated back to the Northern Region Soccer League.

Following their relegation, Pirates approached Chegutu Municipality for funding to cover the $6000 affiliation fee to the league. However, they were turned down, placing their participation in doubt.

== Honours ==
- Northern Region Soccer League
  - Champions (1): 2023
