= Eastern Lions =

Eastern Lions may refer to:

- Bantu Tshintsha Guluva Rovers F.C., a football club in Zimbabwe formerly named Eastern Lions FC
- Eastern Lions SC, a football club in Victoria, Australia
