= Arnold Chaka =

Zimbabwean footballer (born 1981)

Personal information
- Date of birth: 12 July 1981 (age 45)
- Position: Defender

Senior career*
| Years | Team | Apps | (Gls) |
| 2008–2011 | Gunners | | |
| 2011–2014 | Mochudi Centre Chiefs | | |

International career^{‡}
| 2012 | Zimbabwe | 3 | (0) |
- * Club domestic league appearances and goals as of 14 November 2020 ‡ National team caps and goals as of 14 November 2020

Arnold Chaka (born 12 July 1981) is a retired Zimbabwean football defender.
