= Winston Mhango =

Zimbabwean footballer (born 1988)

Personal information
- Full name: Winston Mutulasoni Mhango
- Date of birth: 28 August 1988 (age 38)
- Place of birth: Hwange, Zimbabwe
- Position: Midfielder

Team information
- Current team: Kabwe Warriors

Senior career*
Years	Team	Apps	(Gls)
2008	Triangle		
2009–2013	Hwange Colliery F.C.		
2013–2018	F.C. Platinum		
2019–	Kabwe Warriors		

International career^{‡}
2017–	Zimbabwe	2	(0)
- * Club domestic league appearances and goals as of 13 November 2020 ‡ National team caps and goals as of 22 March 2019

Winston Mutulasoni Mhango (born 28 August 1988) is a Zimbabwean footballer who plays as a midfielder for Kabwe Warriors. He has been capped twice for the Zimbabwe national football team.
