= Kwekwe United F.C. =

Zimbabwean football club

Kwekwe United
- Ground: Torwood Stadium
- Chairman: Phil Makekera
- League: Zimbabwe Premier Soccer League (ZPSL)
- 2025: 18th of 18 (relegated)

Kwekwe United is a professional football club from Kwekwe that competes in the Zimbabwe Premier Soccer League.

The club gained promotion to the top tier under manager Prince Matore by winning the Central Region in 2024, becoming the first team from Kwekwe in the top tier since Lancashire Steel in 2008.

In their first season back in the PSL, the club experienced financial difficulties, failing to meet a fixture against Herentals after the players went on strike due to unpaid salaries. The club forfeited the game 3-0 and was fined US$3500. As of May 2025, owner Phil Makekera admitted that the club still owed signing on fees for many of the thirty new players signed for the new season.

Kwekwe eventually finished in last position, 25 points behind the second-last team.

== Honours ==
- Central Region Soccer League
  - Champions (1): 2024
