= Norton, Zimbabwe =

Coordinates: 17°53′S 30°42′E

Norton Chivero
- town
- Location within Zimbabwe
- Country: Zimbabwe
- Province: Mashonaland West

Government
  - Type: Town Council
  - Member of Parliament for Norton: Richard Tsvangirayi
  - Council Chairperson (Mayor): Councillor Action Mataruse

Population (2022 census)
  - Total: 87,038

Norton is a commuter town and suburb of Harare in the province of Mashonaland West, Zimbabwe. It is located about 40 km west of Harare on the main road and railway line connecting Harare and Bulawayo.

== Demographics ==
Historical population
Year	Pop.	±%
1982	12,360	—
1992	20,405	+65.1%
2002	44,054	+115.9%
2012	67,591	+53.4%

According to the 1982 Population Census, the town had a population of 12,360. This rose to 20,405 in the 1992 census 44,054 in the 2002 census, and 67,591 in the 2012 census.

== History ==
The settlement began in 1914 when a railway siding was built. The town was named after the Norton family who were farming in the area since the 1890s and were killed in the First Chimurenga in 1896. The town grew as an administrative and commercial hub in a rich agricultural area. It later developed into a key industrial centre due to its proximity to water and power supplies, with a main intake point from the Lake Kariba hydroelectric dam to the national grid located nearby. The construction of the nearby Lake Chivero dam provided a further boost to development. It also lies adjacent to Lake Manyame.

== Economy ==
The farm lands surrounding the town produce a range of crops including tobacco, maize and wheat, and cattle rearing for the beef and dairy industries is also an important element of the local economy. From the 1960s onward, a large pulp and paper mill, a brewery and several factories were established in the town. However, these were badly hit by the economic crisis of the late 2000s.

== Sport ==
The Norton-based MWOS compete in the Zimbabwe Premier Soccer League, playing at the Ngoni Stadium.

== See also ==
- Knowledge Musona, Zimbabwean footballer, born in Norton in 1990
- Washington Arubi, Zimbabwean footballer, born in Norton in 1985
- List of cities and towns in Zimbabwe
