= Chisumbanje =

Area in Manicaland, Zimbabwe

Chisumbanje is an area located in the province of Manicaland in Zimbabwe. Chisumbanje is situated in Chipinge District, one of seven districts in the province. It is located in the Dowoyo communal land on the eastern bank of the Save River, about 95 km (59 mi) south of Birchenough Bridge.

== Governance ==
Chisumbanje is under the traditional leadership of Chief Garahwa. Other districts in the region of the Manicaland Province include Mutare, Chimanimani, Nyanga and Mutasa.

== Culture ==
Muchongoyo is a dance popular in the region. Besides entertaining villagers, the dance is also a source of unity and love amongst the locals.

== Climate ==
The area is arid because it lies in a valley and crop yields are generally poor, leaving residents prone to food insecurity. It is different from the other northern parts of Chipinge district that lie in Zimbabwe's region.

== Demographics ==
While Chipinge is rural, Chisumbanje has a population of roughly 300,000 people.

== Transport ==
Chisumbanje is linked by a tarred road to the Manicaland provincial capital, Mutare, and the district capital, Chipinge town. It reaches to Lowveld and to the South African border crossing at Beitbridge.

== Cities and towns ==
Nearby cities and towns include Chisumbanje, Mabhiza, Machona, Vheneka, Chitepo, Cosmo, Matikwa, Munepasi, and Manzvire. The closest major city is Mutare.

== Economy ==
Their economy is largely agricultural. The most common crops are maize, millet, rapko, cotton, and sugarcane. It is a taboo to grow millet in Chief Musikavanhu's area. The local varieties of crops contrast sharply with the commercial estates where coffee, tea, and bananas are grown. The area is rich in gold, coal, zinc, manganese, uranium, and little deposits of platinum.

=== Ethanol Plant ===
The Chisumbanje Ethanol Project, is a national project, In which, ethanol can be produced from sugarcane. It is seen as one of Africa's largest ethanol projects. The project consists of sugarcane plantations in Chisumbanje and Middle Sabi, placing the ethanol plant in Chisumbanje. It is also a consortium of local investors in partnership with the government's Agriculture and Rural Development Authority, ARDA.

At its peak, the Chisumbanje ethanol project – and ARDA's cane-growing adjacent farms operated by the private investors trading as Rating (at Middle Sabi) and Macdom (at Chisumbanje) – has been projected to create employment for more than 8,000 people, becoming one of the single largest job creation ventures in Zimbabwe in recent years.

== Sport ==
Zimbabwe Premier Soccer League club Green Fuel are based in Chisumbanje.

== Irrigation ==
Irrigation infrastructure is available with an ethanol-producing plant constructed.

== Health centers ==
Chisumbanje has eight clinics that are run by the Ministry of Health. The Clinics are St Peters, Madhuku, Arda, Chisumbanje, Veneka, Mabee, Matandwa, Chisuma, Mutandahwe, and Mahenye.

== Primary schools ==
Chisumbanje has about 20 primary schools and 12 secondary schools that is run by the Ministry of Education. These are located in the various wards in the Chisumbanje area.

== See also ==
- Manicaland Province
- Save River
- Chipinge District
