= Shu Shine F.C. =

Shushine FC
- Dissolved: 1994
- Ground: Mandava Stadium, Zvishavane
- League: Zimbabwe Premier League
- 1993, 16th of 16

Shu-Shine F.C. was an association football club based in Zvishavane, Zimbabwe, which was a founder member of the Zimbabwe Premier Soccer League in 1993. They played home matches in the top flight at Mandava Stadium in Zvishavane. The club folded shortly after their relegation, in 1994.

Shu-Shine were named after their sponsor, a local bus company.

== History ==
In the late 1980s, Shu-Shine were playing in Division Two, the third tier of football in Zimbabwe. The owners purchased a Division One franchise and then won promotion in 1991. In 1992, they finished 14th of 14 but were not relegated because the breakaway Zimbabwe Premier League expanded from 14 to 16 clubs. However, in 1993, Shu-Shine finished bottom of the table again and were relegated. Shu-shine were known for their players Tavaka Gumbo and Isaac Riyano, who were both included in the Soccer Star of the Year 1993 calendar despite Shu-shine's relegation, and for a tactical, pass-heavy style of play.

The team had several coaches during its two years in the top division, including Hamid Dhana, who had appeared for the Zimbabwean national team in the 1980s.
