= Amazulu F.C. (Zimbabwe) =

Zimbabwean football club

Amazulu
- Full name: Amazulu FC
- Founded: 1996
- Dissolved: 2005
- Ground: Barbourfields Stadium, Zimbabwe
- League: Zimbabwe Premier Soccer League

Amazulu FC was a football club based in Bulawayo, Zimbabwe. The club played in the Zimbabwe Premier Soccer League.

The team was founded in 1996 by Charles Mhlauri and after nine years the club was dissolved.

In 2003 the team has won the Zimbabwe Premier Soccer League.

== Honours ==
- Zimbabwe Premier Soccer League (1): 2003
- Zimbabwean Independence Trophy (1): 1999

== Performance in CAF competitions ==
- CAF Champions League: 1 appearance

2004 – First Round

== See also ==
- List of football clubs in Zimbabwe
- Football in Zimbabwe
- Zimbabwe Premier Soccer League
