= Triple B F.C. =

Zimbabwean football club

Triple B
- Full name: Triple B Football Club
- Ground: Dulibadzimu Stadium, Beitbridge, Zimbabwe
- Capacity: 4,000
- League: Zimbabwe Premier Soccer League
- 2013: 15

Triple B Football Club is a Zimbabwean football club based in Beitbridge. They play in the second division of Zimbabwean football, the Zimbabwe Division One.

== League participations ==
- Zimbabwe Premier Soccer League: ?-2013
- Zimbabwe Division One: 2013–

== Stadium ==
Currently the team plays at the 4000 capacity Dulibadzimu Stadium.
