= MWOS F.C. =

Zimbabwean football club

- Full name: Moors World of Sport F.C.
- Founded: 2019; 7 years ago
- Ground: Ngoni Stadium, Norton
- Capacity: 7,000
- League: Zimbabwe Premier Soccer League (ZPSL)
- 2025: 2nd
- Website: mwosfc.co.zw

MWOS F.C. is a Zimbabwean football club based in Norton that competes in the Zimbabwe Premier Soccer League (ZPSL).

After finishing second behind Scottland and missing out on promotion from the 2024 Northern Region, MWOS purchased the franchise and right to play in the ZPSL from ZPC Hwange, after Hwange chose not to compete due to financial constraints and restrictions on a single entity owning two teams in the same league.

In their first season in the ZPSL, the club started well, and were top of the log and undefeated after seven games, eventually finishing second. The club temporarily used the Baobab Stadium while its home Ngoni Stadium underwent renovations, before returning to Ngoni for the club's seventh game of the season.
