= Football in Zimbabwe =

- Country: Zimbabwe
- Governing body: Zimbabwe Football Association
- National teams: Men's national team; Women's national team
- Nicknames: Mighty Warriors, Warriors
- First played: at least 1890 (men); unknown (women)

National competitions
- FIFA World Cup (m); FIFA Women's World Cup (w); Africa Cup of Nations (m); Women's Africa Cup of Nations (w); African Nations Championship (m); COSAFA Cup (m); COSAFA Women's Championship (w); Olympic Games (w)

Club competitions
- Zimbabwe Premier Soccer League (m); Cup of Zimbabwe (m); Zimbabwean Independence Trophy (m); Zimbabwe Division 1 (m); Zimbabwe Women's League (w)

International competitions
- FIFA Club World Cup (m); CAF Champions League (m); CAF Women's Champions League (w); CAF Confederation Cup (m)

The sport of football in the country of Zimbabwe is run by the Zimbabwe Football Association. The association administers the men's national team, the women's national team as well as the Premier League and the Zimbabwean Women's League. It is the most popular sport in that nation. It was introduced to the country by the British colonialists by the end of the 19th century and quickly took hold.

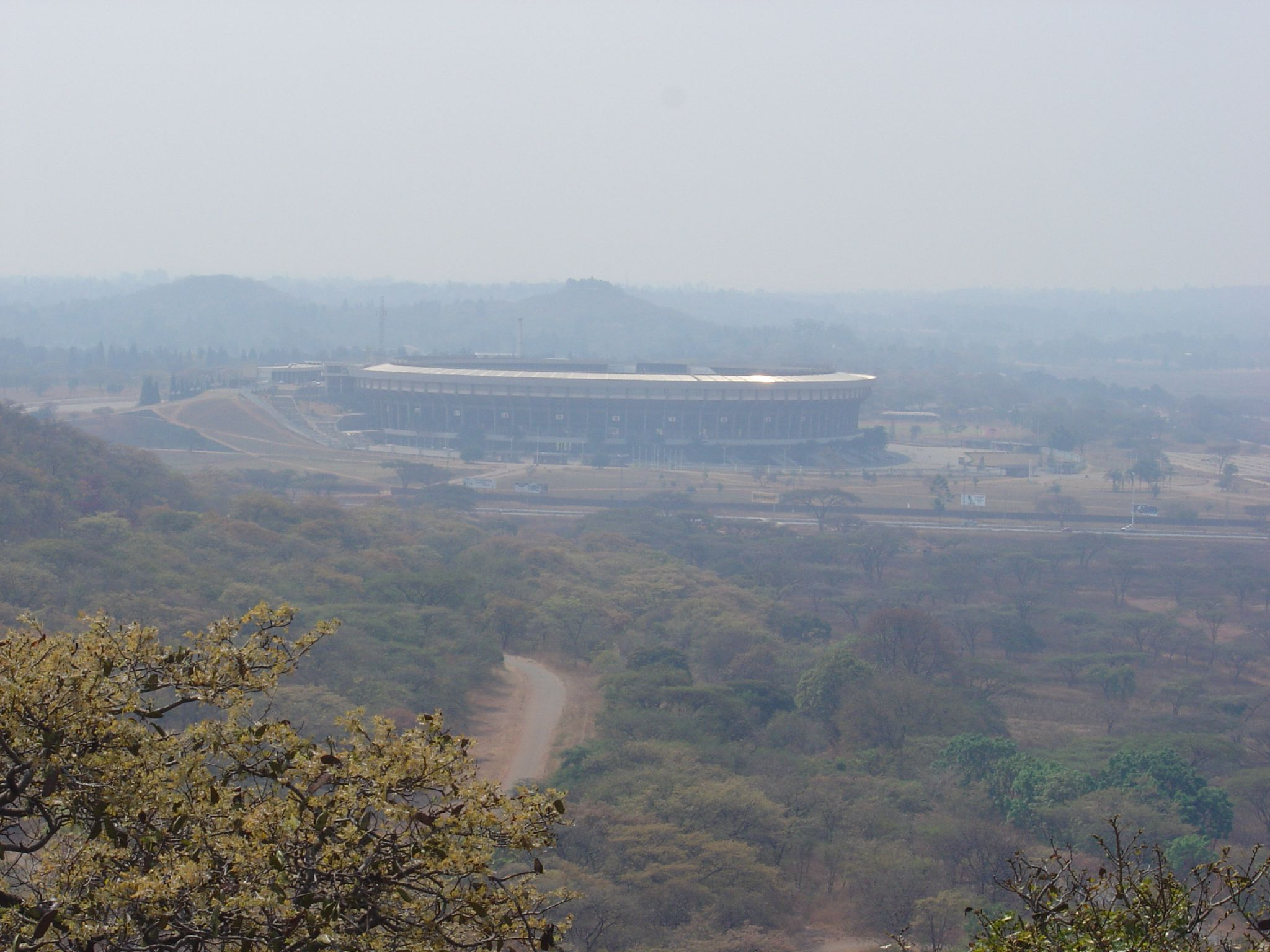
The National Sports Stadium of Zimbabwe.

== Early history ==
From 1890 onwards, white settlers played football in what was then Southern Rhodesia. As in other sports, a strict racial separation prevented Black men and women from participating in the sport. The first club for male Black workers, set up to divert black labourers from protests and gambling, was Highlanders F.C., which was founded in Bulawayo in the 1920s. It is unknown whether women's football was organised in any form at the time.

A men's national team was first formed to play the visiting England Amateur national football team in 1929. In 1946 a men's national team played a first full international against Northern Rhodesia (Zambia).Liwena, Ridgeway (2006). The Zambian Soccer Scene (2nd ed.). Until 1965, only white men were selected to play for the national team.

== Football governance ==
The Zimbabwe Football Association (ZIFA) is the governing body of football in Zimbabwe. It was formed in 1892 and has governed men's football since then and women's football since the mid-1990s.

ZIFA joined FIFA in 1965 and CAF in 1980.

== Leagues ==
The highest tier in women's football is the Zimbabwe Women's Football Super League, while the highest men's league is called Zimbabwe Premier Soccer League.

== Cup system ==
The Cup of Zimbabwe is the national men's football cup tournament, while the Zimbabwean Independence Trophy, often also called Uhuru Cup, is an additional annual cup event. There is currently no similar women's national cup tournament in Zimbabwe.

The winner of the previous season's Zimbabwe Premier Soccer League and Cup of Zimbabwe play in the Castle Challenge Cup at the beginning of the following season.

In March, the Munhumutapa Challenge Cup was launched as an additional cup tournament for both, men and women. With a five-year sponsorship, $US5 million prize money annually, including US$1 million for the men's winner and US$200,000 for the women's winner, it is one of Africa's richest competitions.

== Men's national team ==
The biggest success of the Zimbabwe men's national team to date was the participation in the Africa Cup of Nations in Tunisia 2004, Egypt 2006, Gabon 2017, Egypt 2019 and Cameroon 2021. A team of players from the local league furthermore finished fourth at the 2014 African Nations Championship.

== Women's national team ==
The Zimbabwe women's national football team is the only Zimbabwean international team that qualified for a major intercontinental tournament, the 2016 Olympics in Brazil. While losing all three group stage matches against Germany, Canada and Australia, they managed to score a single goal in each match. The national team also finished fourth at the 2000 African Women's Championship in South Africa and qualified for the Women's Africa Cup of Nations in Nigeria 2002, South Africa 2004 and Cameroon 2016. In 2011, the women's national team won the 2011 COSAFA Women's Championship on home soil.

== Support ==
Twitter research from 2015 found that the most popular English Premier League club in Zimbabwe was Manchester United, with 28% of Zimbabwean Premier League fans following the club, followed by Chelsea (19%) and Arsenal (17%).

== Attendances ==
Average attendances in the men's top-flight league, together with the club recording the highest average attendance:

Season	League average	Best club	Best club average
2023	1,667	Highlanders FC	9,034

== See also ==
- Lists of stadiums
