= Agama F.C. =

Zimbabwean football club

- Founded: 2022; 4 years ago
- League: Zimbabwe Premier Soccer League (ZPSL)
- 2025: 1st (champions, Zimbabwe Division One Northern Region)

Agama F.C. is a professional football club from Mount Darwin that competes in the Zimbabwe Premier Soccer League (ZPSL).

The club was promoted to the ZPSL after winning the Northern Region, going unbeaten through the season.

== Honours ==
- Northern Region Soccer League
  - Champions (1): 2025
