= Lengthens F.C. =

Zimbabwean football club

Lengthens FC
- Full name: Lengthens Football Club
- Nickname: The Happy People
- Founded: 2002; 24 years ago
- Ground: Rufaro Stadium; Harare, Zimbabwe
- Capacity: 60,000
- Manager: Jostein Mathuthu
Home colours

Lengthens FC are a football club who play in the Zimbabwe Premier Soccer League.

== Performance in CAF competitions ==
- CAF Confederation Cup: 1 appearance

2010 – First Round
