= Bikita Minerals F.C. =

Zimbabwean football club

Bikita Minerals
- Nickname: Lithium Boys
- Ground: Lithium Stadium, Gibbo Stadium
- League: Zimbabwe Premier Soccer League (ZPSL)
- 2025: 16th of 18 (relegated)

Bikita Minerals is a professional football club from Bikita District, Masvingo, that competes in the Zimbabwe Premier Soccer League.

The club was promoted to the top tier after winning the Eastern Region Soccer League in 2023.

Bikita Minerals narrowly avoided relegation in its first season, finishing 14th.

== Honours ==
- Eastern Region Soccer League
  - Champions (1): 2023
