= Njube Sundowns F.C. =

Zimbabwean football club

- League: Zimbabwe Premier Soccer League (ZPSL)

Njube Sundowns was a Zimbabwean football team. They played their home matches in Gwanda.

== Achievements ==
- Zimbabwean Independence Trophy: 1

2009
