= Kiglon F.C. =

Zimbabwean football club

Kiglon
- Full name: Kiglon Football Club
- Founded: 2004; 21 years ago
- Ground: Chitungwiza Stadium; Chitungwiza, Zimbabwe
- Capacity: 3,000
- League: Zimbabwe Premier Soccer League (ZPSL)
- 2011: 16th
Home colours

Kiglon F.C. is a Chitungwiza-based football club, that got promoted from Zimbabwean Second Division to the top level Zimbabwe Premier Soccer League in 2008.
