= Underhill F.C. =

Zimbabwean football club

Underhill
- Full name: Underhill Football Club
- Ground: Dulibadzimu stadium Beitbridge, Zimbabwe
- League: Zimbabwe Premier Soccer League (ZPSL)
Home colours

Underhill F.C. is an individually owned premier league football club based in Beitbridge, Zimbabwe. Underhill are playing home matches in Masvingo (Mucheke stadium) until their own stadium in Beitbridge (Dulibadzimu) is upgraded;
