= Mushowani Stars F.C. =

Zimbabwean football club

- Nickname(s): Tiki Taka Boys
- Founded: 2011
- Ground: Trojan Stadium, Bindura
- Capacity: 2000
- Owner: Lovemore Z Nyakasoka
- Chairman: Irvine Nyakasoka
- Manager: Newman Mashipe
- League: Zimbabwean Division One
colours

Mushowani Stars F.C. are a football team from Madziva, Zimbabwe, currently playing in the Zimbabwean Division One.

They were founded in 2011 and began play in the third tier of Zimbabwe's football pyramid and gained promotion in 2013.

The Stars won the 2018 Division One North, gaining promotion to the Premier Soccer League. They are the second club from Mashonaland to play in the top flight.

In 2019, The Stars were relegated after finishing at the bottom of the Premier Soccer League.

Players for the club
No.	Pos.	Nation	Player
1	GK	ZIM	Tawanda Kaseke
2	GK	ZIM	Nyasha Chasara
3	DF	ZIM	Tanaka Gore
4	DF	ZIM	Munashe Tigere
5	DF	ZIM	Matewu Chindeva
7	DF	ZIM	Tawanda Chikuwanyanga
10	DF	ZIM	Junior Mukombe
13	MF	ZIM	Peter Mazango
14	MF	ZIM	Emmanuel Jalai
15	MF	ZIM	Kuda Mutema
16	DF	ZIM	Panashe Moyo
19	DF	ZIM	Trojan Merge
20	DF	ZIM	Rukudzo Midzi
6	DF	ZIM	Shingirai Mandizwidza
8	DF	ZIM	Tatenda Sithole
