= Scottland F.C. =

Zimbabwean football club

Scottland
- Founded: 2023; 3 years ago
- Owner: Pedzisayi "Scott" Sakupwanya
- Coach: Knowledge Musona
- League: Zimbabwe Premier Soccer League (ZPSL)
- 2025: 1st (champions)

Scottland F.C. is a professional football club from Harare that competes in the Zimbabwe Premier Soccer League (ZPSL).

== History ==
They were promoted to the ZPSL after winning the Northern Region.

Prior to the start of the 2025 season, they secured close to R50 million in sponsorship, making them one of the richest clubs in the country. They also purchased a number of top players from champions Simba Bhora, and other ZPSL clubs, earning them the moniker "the Mamelodi Sundowns of Zimbabwe", and making them one of the favourites for the title.

As of March 2025, the two highest-paid footballers in Zimbabwe, Khama Billiat and Walter Musona, both play for Scottland.

In August 2025, Scottland signed Knowledge Musona, making him the highest-earner in the league.

The club is owned by Scott Sakupwanya, who is a member of parliament representing ZANU–PF in Mabvuku–Tafara.

Scottland won the 2025 Zimbabwe Premier Soccer League, the first team since Black Rhinos in 1984 to win the title in their maiden season in the top flight, with Wicknell Chivayo purportedly sponsoring the club to the amount of US$1 million.

Title-winning coach Tonderai Ndiraya was dismissed shortly after winning the league, and replaced by Norman Mapeza.

Mapeza was dimissed after Scottland squandered a 2-goal lead in the first leg of their 2026–27 CAF Champions League second round tie with Petro de Luanda, losing 2–3 on aggregate. Scottland had also led the 2026 Zimbabwe Premier Soccer League by nine points at one stage in the season, before falling back and trailing leaders Hardrock by eight points at the time of Mapeza's dismissal.

=== Corruption ===
In October 2026, an official affiliated with Scottland attempted to bribe CAPS player Washington Arubi before their upcoming game. Arubi rejected the bribery attempt.

== Honours ==
- Zimbabwe Premier Soccer League
  - Champions (1): 2025
- Northern Region Soccer League
  - Champions (1): 2024
- Castle Challenge Cup
  - Champions (1): 2026
