= CAPS F.C. =

Zimbabwean football club

- Ground: Gwanzura Stadium; Harare, Zimbabwe
- Manager: Keith Jena
- League: Zimbabwe Premier Soccer League (ZPSL)

CAPS F.C. is a Harare-based Zimbabwean soccer team. There has been repeated controversy over their use of the name "CAPS" as the current owners sold the CAPS United F.C. franchise to businessman Twine Phiri but later, on purchasing the Buymore franchise, wished to once again use the name CAPS. Following the relegation of CAPS F.C., the owners completed a take-over of premiership side Shooting Stars and renamed it CAPS, although the name is still to be approved by the Zimbabwe Premier Soccer League.
