= Green Fuel F.C. =

Zimbabwean football club

Green Fuel
- Ground: Green Fuel Arena
- Capacity: 5,000
- League: Zimbabwe Premier Soccer League (ZPSL)
- 2025: 15th

Green Fuel is a Zimbabwean soccer club that competes in the Zimbabwe Premier Soccer League (ZPSL). They are based in Chisumbanje.

After winning the 2022 Eastern Region Soccer League, Green Fuel earned promotion to the 2023 Zimbabwe Premier Soccer League. They completely overhauled the team, with seventeen new signings, finishing tenth in their first season.

The club has seen a large turnover of players and coaches in their few years in the top tier.

The club is sponsored by, and derives its name from, Green Fuel, a Zimbabwean fuel company.

== Honours ==
- Eastern Region Soccer League
  - Champions (1): 2022
