= Gunners F.C. =

Association football club in Zimbabwe

- Full name: Gunners Football Club
- Founded: 2005; 21 years ago
- Ground: Lafarge Stadium
- Capacity: 10,000
- Owner: Prophet Walter Magaya

Not to be confused with "The Gunners", the nickname of Arsenal F.C.

Gunners Football Club was a Zimbabwe-based professional football club, which played in the Zimbabwe Premier Soccer League. They were well known for their saying "chicken masala", an oxymoron meaning, 'it's so cold, you feel hot' - an expression of how opponents would feel after playing against them. After the purchase of Gunners FC by Prophet Magaya Walter, the club was renamed to Yadah Gunners FC, before merging with the newly-formed Yadah Stars F.C. shortly after.

Gunners FC preferred a more attacking play, which attracted big crowds of supporters to their games, this style of quick strides to the front and studied build-ups allowed them to inherit the name Gunners & took inspiration from the nickname of the English team in London, Arsenal F.C. In their traditional red and white home kit gunners were big contenders in the famous local premier soccer league during their stay in the Zimbabwe Premier League.

== Brief history ==
Gunners FC was formed in 2005 and then was later purchased by prophet Walter Magaya who became partners with the then President Cuthbert Chitima. They were relegated from the Premier soccer league division 1 to the division 2 in 2012, which led to legendary player and coach Moses Chunga deciding to take time off football then returning again to coach Harare City Football Club. Yadah Gunners rose to victory when they won the ZPSL. In 2009 which was very historic for the club because this allowed them to qualify for the prestigious CAF Champions league.

== Players ==
Player	Country	Position	born
A
Qadr Amini	Zimbabwe	Defender	26/01/1990
C
George Chigona	Zimbabwe	Goalkeeper	04/03/1991
D
Moses Demera	Zimbabwe	Forward	03/03/1989
Tafadzwa Dube	Zimbabwe	Goalkeeper	19/12/1984
G
Carrington Gomba	Zimbabwe	Midfielder	08/03/1985
K
Willard Katsande	Zimbabwe	Midfielder	15/01/1986
L
Joel Lupahla	Zimbabwe	Forward	26/04/1977
S
Ali Sadiki	Zimbabwe	Midfielder	10/12/1987
Edmore Sibanda	Zimbabwe	Goalkeeper	03/04/1986
V
Daniel Vheremu	Zimbabwe	Defender	18/03/1985
Z
Ramson Zhuwawo	Zimbabwe	Midfielder	03/11/1983
Hardlife Zvirekwi	Zimbabwe	Defender	05/05/1987

== Honours and achievements ==
- Zimbabwe Premier Soccer League
  - Champions (1): 2009
