= Zimbabwean Independence Trophy =

The Zimbabwean Independence Trophy is a Zimbabwean association football knockout tournament. It was created as a clubs competition in 1983 played during commemorations of the country's independence. The final is usually played on 18 April, which is the nation's Independence Day.

== Winners ==
Previous winners are:

- 1983 : Dynamos (Harare) (1)
- 1984 : Dynamos (Harare) (2)
- 1985 : Zonal match
- 1986 : Highlanders (Bulawayo) (1)
- 1987 : Black Rhinos (Harare) (1)
- 1988 : Highlanders (Bulawayo) (2)
- 1989 : Zimbabwe Saints (Bulawayo) (1)
- 1990 : Dynamos (Harare) (3)
- 1991 : Highlanders (Bulawayo) (3)
- 1992 : CAPS United (Harare) (1)
- 1993 : CAPS United (Harare) (2)
- 1994 : Chapungu United (Gweru) (1)
- 1995 : Dynamos (Harare) (4)
- 1996 : CAPS United (Harare) (3)
- 1997 : CAPS United (Harare) (4)
- 1998 : Dynamos (Harare) (5)
- 1999 : Amazulu (Bulawayo) (1)
- 2000 : No cup held
- 2001 : Highlanders (Bulawayo) (4)
- 2002 : Highlanders (Bulawayo) (5)
- 2003 : Black Rhinos (Harare) (2)
- 2004 : Dynamos (Harare) (6)
- 2005 : Motor Action (1)
- 2006 : Masvingo United (Masvingo) (1)
- 2007 : Masvingo United (Masvingo) (2)
- 2008 : Shooting Stars (1)
- 2009 : Njube Sundowns (Gwanda) (1)
- 2010 : Dynamos (Harare) (7)
- 2011 : Highlanders (Bulawayo) (6)
- 2012 : Platinum (Zvishavane) (1)
- 2013 : Dynamos (Harare) (8)
- 2014 : Platinum(Harare) (9)
- 2015 : Dynamos (Zvishavane) (3)
- 2016 : Chicken Inn FC (Bulawayo) (1)
- 2017 : Dynamos (Harare) (10)
- 2019 : Highlanders (Bulawayo) (7)
- 2020 : Not held
- 2021 : Dynamos (Harare) (11)
- 2022 : Highlanders (Bulawayo) (8)
- 2023 : Highlanders (Bulawayo) (9)
- 2024 : Dynamos (Harare) (12)
- 2025 : Dynamos (Harare) (13)

== Performance by club ==
Club	Winners	Runners-up	Winning seasons
Dynamos	13		
Highlanders	9		
CAPS United	4		1992, 1993, 1996, 1997
Black Rhinos	2		1987, 2003
Masvingo United	2		2006, 2007
F.C. Platinum	2		2012, 2014
Zimbabwe Saints	1		1989
Chapungu United	1		1994
Amazulu	1		1999
Motor Action	1		2005
Shooting Stars	1		2008
Njube Sundowns	1		2009
Chicken Inn	1		2016
