= Zimbabwe Saints F.C. =

Zimbabwean football club

Zimbabwe Saints Football Club
- Full name: Zimbabwe Saints
- Nickname: Chikwata "The Team"
- Founded: 1931
- Dissolved: 2016
- Ground: Barbourfields Stadium; Bulawayo, Zimbabwe
- Capacity: 35,000
- Chairman: Gibson Homela
- Head Coach: Edmore Sibanda
- League: Zimbabwe Premier Soccer League
- 2011: 14th
Home colours	Away colours

Zimbabwe Saints FC is a former Premier League football club based in Bulawayo, Zimbabwe. It was one of the top clubs in the country.

== History ==
One of the oldest clubs in Zimbabwe, it was formed in 1931 by a merger of several teams which had their origins from Shona speaking areas but based in Bulawayo. The name Mashonaland United FC was used up until 1975 when nationalist leaders such as Dr Herbert Ushewokunze and Dr Joshua Nkomo (both late) felt tribal names were causing divisions among African people. It then changed its name to Zimbabwe Saints Football Club. Some of its early players include the late Vice President of Zimbabwe and the patron of ZIFA, Honourable Joseph Msika.

The "Chauya Chikwata" as it is nicknamed was one of the best-performing teams in the Zimbabwe Premier Soccer League in the 1980s and early 1990s.

Famous for its youth development, the club has been home to some of the more notable footballers from the Zimbabwean national team.

The most famous class of 1988 coached by Roy Baretto went on a 23-game unbeaten streak to capture the Zimbabwe Premier Soccer League Championship in style. They were also losing semi-finalists of CECAFA Club championships in 1988. It went on to play in the CAF Club Champions Cup in 1989 and was eliminated in the quarter-finals.

In-club fighting has been the major cause of the club's decline. The club was demoted 2 times in 2004 and 2006. In 2007 a new executive led by seasoned administrator Elliot Manduna was elected into office. Since then the club was on a rebuilding exercise. It introduced a development side in Division Two.

=== Merger ===
On Saturday 31 January 2009, the Life members of the club voted in favour of a merger with Njube Sundowns Football Club another Bulawayo based club. This was not successful but in February 2011, they bought the franchise of Chitungwiza-based Zimbabwe Premier League outfit Eagles. Zimbabwe Saints were relegated from the Premier Soccer League in 2006. The return of Zimbabwe Saints in 2011 into the premiership would bring more excitement into the league in Bulawayo. The city already had Highlanders and Chicken Inn in the Premier League.

=== Disappearance ===
On May 3, 2016, Zimbabwe Saints have been expelled from the Zifa Bulawayo Province Division Two League, for failing to affiliate and fulfil three consecutive matches.

== Clubhouse ==
Zimbabwe Saints were one of the few teams in Zimbabwe who own sporting facilities. The sports club or clubhouse as it is popularly known is situated in Queens Park East, north-east of Bulawayo. Besides a soccer pitch, other sporting facilities at the clubhouse include tennis courts, netball court, volleyball court and darts. There is also a sports bar used by the members and supporters.

== Honours ==
- Zimbabwe Premier Soccer League: 2

1977, 1988

- Zimbabwean Cup: 3

1977, 1979, 1987

- Zimbabwean Independence Trophy: 1

1989

- Southern Region Division One: 1

2005

== Performance in CAF competitions ==
- African Cup of Champions Clubs: 1 appearance

1989: Quarter-Final
