= TelOne F.C. =

Zimbabwean football club

- Nickname: WiFi Boys
- Founded: 2016; 10 years ago
- Ground: Bata Stadium, Gweru
- League: Zimbabwe Premier Soccer League (ZPSL)
- 2025: 5th of 18

TelOne F.C. is a professional football club that competes in the Zimbabwe Premier Soccer League (ZPSL).

== History ==
Founded in 2016, they initially competed in the third tier. They were promoted to the Central Region Soccer League in 2017, earning promotion in 2018 to the 2019 Zimbabwe Premier Soccer League. They were relegated in their first season in the top tier, finishing sixteenth.

They were promoted again after winning the 2023 Central Region Soccer League. They performed much better in their second attempt at the top tier, finishing tenth in the 2024 Zimbabwe Premier Soccer League, before finishing fifth in 2025, their highest position to date.

== Sponsorship ==
TelOne are sponsored by TelOne Zimbabwe, a telecommunications company. In 2024, the deal was worth US$800,000.

== Honours ==
- Central Region Soccer League
  - Champions (2): 2018, 2023
