= Motor Action F.C. =

Zimbabwean football club

Motor Action
- Full name: Motor Action Football Club
- Nickname(s): Mighty Bulls
- Founded: 2000; 25 years ago
- Ground: Sakubva Stadium; Mutare, Zimbabwe
- Capacity: 10,000
- Chairman: Eric Rosen
- League: Zimbabwe Premier Soccer League (ZPSL)
- 2011: 3rd
Home colours

Motor Action Football Club was a Zimbabwean football club based in Harare. They played in the top division in Zimbabwean football. In early 2000, the idea of owning a Premier League side by the current owners became reality. Out of the ashes of defunct Blackpool, Motor Action was born.

Motor Action played most home matches in Mutare (Sakubva Stadium);

== Achievements ==
- Zimbabwean League Champions: 1

2010

- Zimbabwean Independence Trophy: 1

2005

== Performance in CAF competitions ==
- CAF Champions League: 1 appearance

2011 – First Round
2012 - 0 appearances
