= Simba Bhora F.C. =

Zimbabwean football club

Simba Bhora
- Owner: Simba Ndoro
- Coach: Joel Luphahla
- League: Zimbabwe Premier Soccer League (ZPSL)
- 2025: 3rd

Simba Bhora is a professional football club from Shamva, Mashonaland Central, that competes in the Zimbabwe Premier Soccer League.

They won the 2024 Zimbabwe Premier Soccer League two seasons after gaining promotion from the Northern Region Division One League.

They are the first club from Mashonaland Central to win the Premier Soccer League.

Prior to the start of the 2025 season, a number of their star players were bought by big-spending newly promoted Scottland.

Having qualified for the 2025–26 CAF Champions League, Simba Bhora were unable to play their home games in Zimbabwe due to the lack of certified stadiums in the country.

== Honours ==
- Zimbabwe Premier Soccer League
  - Champions (1): 2024
- Northern Region Soccer League
  - Champions (1): 2022
