= Bantu Tshintsha Guluva Rovers F.C. =

Zimbabwean football club

Bantu Rovers
- Full name: Bantu Rovers Football Club
- Nickname(s): Tshintsha Guluva
- Founded: 2008; 17 years ago
- Ground: Barbourfields Stadium; Bulawayo, Zimbabwe
- Chairman: Methembe Ndlovu
- Manager: Methembe Ndlovu
- League: Zimbabwe Premier Soccer League (ZPSL)
Home colours

Bantu Tshintsha Guluva Rovers Football Club is a Zimbabwean football club based in Bulawayo since their recent purchase by a group of businessmen from that city. Prior to that the club was named Eastern Lions Football Club and based in Mutare, Manicaland.
