= Yadah Stars F.C. =

Team in the Zimbabwe Premier Soccer League

Yadah Stars FC
- Full name: Yadah Stars Football Club
- Nicknames: Miracle Boys, The Stars
- Founded: 2013; 12 years ago
- Ground: National Sports Stadium, Harare
- Capacity: 80,000
- Chairman: Walter Magaya
- Coach: Jairos Tapera
- League: Zimbabwe Premier Soccer League
- 2025: 17th of 18 (relegated)
colours	colours

Yadah Stars FC are a football club from Harare, Zimbabwe currently playing in the Zimbabwe Premier Soccer League, the top flight of Zimbabwean football.

Yadah Stars were the first church-owned football team to reach the Zimbabwe top flight after they won the 2016 Zifa Division One Eastern Region. However, the church pulled out of sponsorship after the 2017 season.

== History ==
Yadah FC was originally formed as Gunners in 2005 by Cuthbert Chitima. Gunners was later on purchased by Walter Magaya in 2014. Magaya entered into a partnership with the then President Cuthbert Chitima. The team's name was changed to Yadah Gunners. They were relegated from the Premier soccer league to division 1 in 2012, which led to legendary player and coach, Moses Chunga, deciding to take time off football then returning again to coach Harare City Football Club. Yadah Stars regained promotion to the Premier League when they triumphed in the ZIFA Eastern Region Division One in their first season in that league in 2016 under the guidance of coach Kuda Masaraure. In 2017, the club appointed Jairos Tapera as the head coach.
