= Chapungu United F.C. =

Zimbabwean football club

Chapungu United
- Ground: Ascot Stadium, Gweru
- Capacity: 5,000
- League: Zimbabwe Division One [Central Region]
- 2019: 15th (Relegated)

Chapungu United is a Zimbabwean football club based in Gweru currently playing in the Zimbabwe Division 1 (Central Region). Their home stadium is Ascot Stadium.

They used to play in the top division in Zimbabwean football, but were relegated to Zimbabwe's Second Division in 2009. They were promoted back to the top flight league in 2014.

Chapungu have won two honours, the first being the Zimbabwean Independence Trophy in 1994 when they beat Eiffel Flats 4–1, and the second the Zimbabwean Cup in 1995 which they won in a walkover after the other semifinal was never completed. The other They failed to defend the Independence Cup in 1995 after losing 5–0 in the final.

They also appeared in the 2006 Castle Cup final, losing 1–0 to Mwana Africa, and the 1988 Independence Cup, losing 1–0 to Highlanders.

== Achievements ==
- Zimbabwean Cup: 1

1995

- Zimbabwean Independence Trophy: 1

1994

== Performance in CAF competitions ==
- CAF Cup Winners' Cup: 1 appearance

1996 – First Round

== Current squad ==
Note: Flags indicate national team as defined under FIFA eligibility rules; some limited exceptions apply. Players may hold more than one non-FIFA nationality.

No.	Pos.	Nation	Player
1	GK	(Scotland) SCO	Matthias Glenday
2	DF	(Zimbabwe) ZIM	Kyel Lachumba
3	DF	(Zimbabwe) ZIM	Edward Fuzurenga
4	DF	(Zimbabwe) ZIM	Babadudu Mugembi
5	DF	(Zimbabwe) ZIM	Robert Wesleydidi
6	MF	(Zimbabwe) ZIM	George Muzorewa
7	MF	(Zimbabwe) ZIM	Abel Dongazuru
8	MF	(Zimbabwe) ZIM	Dafamin Isova
9	MF	(Zimbabwe) ZIM	Uptwar Nisin-Fenyinbled
10	FW	(Zimbabwe) ZIM	Charles Fakdapop
11	FW	(Zimbabwe) ZIM	Nelson Nudududa
