= Bulawayo Chiefs F.C. =

Zimbabwean football club

- Founded: 2012
- Ground: Luveve Stadium, Bulawayo
- Capacity: 30,000
- League: Zimbabwe Premier Soccer League
- 2025: 1st (Division One Southern Region, promoted)
- Website: bulawayochiefs.com

Bulawayo Chiefs F.C. is a football club from Bulawayo, Zimbabwe, currently playing in the top flight Zimbabwe Premier Soccer League.

Since its founding in 2012 the club has won promotion to the PSL three times, in 2013, 2017 and 2025. In 2013 it also won the Machache Meats ZIFA Southern Region Cup. In 2016 they were runners up in the John Landa Nkomo Liquor Hub Super 8 Cup. In addition to the championship the club also worn the John Landa Nkomo Liquor hub Super 8 cup and the Joshua Mqabuko Nkomo top 8 Knockout. In 2017, the club won the ZIFA southern region division one championship thus gaining promotion to the 2018 Premier Soccer League.

They are called“Amakhosi Amahle”.

Bulawayo Chiefs became the first football team in Zimbabwe to launch an online shop selling their club merchandise. The store was launched on 23 June 2020.

The club is bankrolled by miner Lovemore Sibanda.

Chiefs command a large social media following, and have been recognized for their social media presence, gaining over 5,000 followers in its first six months including Italian club AS Roma. As of November 2025, the number of Twitter followers stands at over 92,000.
