= Herentals F.C. =

Zimbabwean football club

- Nickname: Vabvamburi
- Ground: Rufaro Stadium
- Capacity: 60,000
- Chairman: Munashe Mangwendeza
- Coach: Kumbirai Muliwekuziva
- League: Zimbabwe Premier Soccer League
- 2025: 7th of 18
colours

Herentals F.C. are a football club from Harare, Zimbabwe currently playing in the Zimbabwe Premier Soccer League. It is associated with Herentals Group of Colleges, a private education service.

College played their first season in the Zimbabwe second division in 2016 after acquiring the license of a defunct team, Bindura United.

Herentals won the 2017 Northern Region Division One championship, gaining promotion to the top flight Zimbabwe Premier Soccer League for the first time. They finished their maiden top-flight season in 6th place after getting off to a slow start with only two wins from their first seven top flight matches.

== Honours ==
Northern Region Division One: 2017
