= Manica Diamonds F.C. =

Association football team from Mutare, Zimbabwe

Manica Diamonds
- Nickname: Gem Boys
- Founded: 2017
- Ground: Sakubva Stadium, Mutare
- Capacity: 20,000
- League: Zimbabwe Premier Soccer League
- 2025: 10th
colours

Manica Diamonds is a football team from Mutare, Zimbabwe, currently playing in the Zimbabwe Premier Soccer League.

The club was founded in late 2017 after Zimbabwe Consolidated Diamonds Company decided to form the club to help the community. Luke Masomere was named the club's first technical director. They started out in the 2018 Eastern Division zone, Zimbabwe's regional second division.

The Gem Boys were promoted after winning the 2018 Eastern Division zone with an undefeated record of 26–4–0.

They announced their signings ahead of the Premier Soccer League season on 8 January 2019, including their highlight signing of Partson Jaure, a former captain for the Warriors. On 3 Oct 2022, Manica Diamonds sacked Manager, Johanisi Nhumwa after a poor run of results.

== Financial difficulties and sale ==
In April 2026, following financial difficulties where players were unpaid for four months, Manica Diamonds was sold to Eastern Region side African Mineral Ventures (AMV). AMV informed players that it was not responsible for previous debts, and players responded by threatening to boycott fixtures. AMV then proposed disbanding the senior team.
