= Shabanie Mine F.C. =

Zimbabwean football club

Shabanie Mine
- Full name: Shabanie Mine Football Club
- Nickname(s): Chinda Boys, Bvaru Bvaru
- Founded: 1914
- Ground: Maglas Stadium, Zvishavane
- Capacity: 5,000
- Chairman: Elias Marufu
- Manager: Crispen Moyo
- League: ZIFA Division One Central Region
- 2024: 10th
Home colours

Shabanie Mine is a Zimbabwean football club based in Zvishavane. They play in the ZIFA Division One Central Region.
