= Ngezi Platinum F.C. =

Zimbabwean football club

- Full name: Ngezi Platinum Football Club
- Short name: Ngezi Platinum
- Founded: 2001
- Ground: Baobab Stadium, Ngezi
- Capacity: 2,000
- Manager: Takesure Chiragwi
- League: Zimbabwe Premier Soccer League
- 2025: 4th of 18
colours

Ngezi Platinum F.C. (also known as Ngezi Platinum Stars F.C.) is a Zimbabwean football club. They originated from Ngezi Mine and play at the newly refurbished Baobab Stadium in Ngezi. The club won their first-ever league title in 2023.

Ngezi Platinum were promoted to the top flight for the first time in 2016 and proceeded to win the cup final that same season with a 3–1 victory over FC Platinum in the final. Coach Tonderai Ndiraya led Ngezi to a seventh-placed finish in their first season in the Premier Soccer League, but left by mutual consent with five games left in the 2018 season, which Ngezi Platinum ended as runners-up.

== Brief history ==
Ngezi Platinum Stars (NPS) FC formerly known as Ngezi Sporto FC started playing social soccer in 2001 and was at that time sponsored by MCC (Open Cast Contractor). However, in 2004 the club started playing competitive soccer and qualified to join the ZIFA Mashonaland West Division 2B. They played in the ZIFA Northern Region Division 1 in 2015 and won the championship to gain promotion into the Zimbabwe Premier Soccer League under the guidance of Clifton Kadurira.

== Honours ==
- Zimbabwe Premier Soccer League (1): 2023
- Cup of Zimbabwe
  - Champions (1): 2016
  - Runners-up (4): 2019, 2021, 2023, 2024
- Northern Region Championship (1): 2015
- Yadah Cup
- Chibuku Super Cup winners in 2016
- Chibuku Super Cup Losing Finalists (2019)

== Performance in CAF competitions ==
- CAF Champions League: 0 appearance
- CAF Confederation Cup: 1 appearance

2017 – First round (round of 32)
