= Harare City F.C. =

Zimbabwean football club

Harare City FC
- Full name: Harare City Football Club
- Nickname(s): The Sunshine Boys
- Founded: 1989
- Ground: Rufaro Stadium, Harare
- Capacity: 60,000
- Chairman: Alois Masepe
- Manager: Lloyd Chitembwe
- League: Division One
- 2021/22: ▼15th in Premier League
| Home colours | Away colours |

Harare City is a Zimbabwean football club based in Harare.

== History ==
The club was formed in 1989, as the brainchild of two Harare Municipality staffers, Messrs Chinengundu and Thomas.

The project was mooted as a recreational pastime for the city council's workers who began playing in the Harare Social League, under the name City of Harare FC. Four years later, the club applied for affiliation into the ZIFA Division 3A League and stayed there for two seasons, winning promotion into the Division 2A League in 1995.

Due to financial constraints, City of Harare FC rejoined the Harare Social League where they played for five seasons before joining the Highfield Area Zone League in 2000.

The club even had a change of name for two years (2000–1)- "Bhanya Mulenge FC" – before reverting to their original name (City of Harare FC) in 2002.

In 2008, the club rejoined the Division 3A League and won promotion after just that one season into Division 2A.

When they started playing in Division 2A (2009) they renamed the franchise to "Harare City FC".

Under coach Arthur "Tuts" Tutani, the club gained promotion into the Northern Region Division One League in 2010. Tutani then left the club to join Monomotapa FC.

His replacement, Bigboy "ABC" Mawiwi, led "The Sunshine Boys" into the top-flight Premiership at the end of the 2011 season. In their debut season in the top flight, they finished a credible 8th on the standings.

A year later they agonizingly lost the league title on a dramatic last day – falling out to Dynamos on goal difference. Since its formation, the club has produced youth and senior national team players Gilbert Mushangazhike, Tendai Mwarura, Herbert Zimbeva, and David Sengu.

The club was relegated from the top tier at the end of the 2021–22 Zimbabwe Premier Soccer League season.

== Honours ==
Harare City won the 2017 Chibuku Cup, defeating How Mine 3–1.
