= Hwange Colliery F.C. =

Zimbabwean football club

Hwange Football Club
- Full name: Hwange Football Club
- Nickname(s): Chipangano
- Founded: 1940
- Ground: Colliery Stadium; Hwange, Zimbabwe
- Capacity: 15,000
- Chairman: Butholezwe Dube
- Manager: Mebelo Njekwa
- League: Zimbabwe Premier Soccer League (ZPSL)
- 2024: 16th (relegated)
Home colours

Hwange Colliery F.C. (formerly known as Wankie Colliery F.C.) is a football club from Hwange, Zimbabwe, previously playing in the Zimbabwe Premier Soccer League

The club has won its fair share of honours along its history, beating a star-studded Callies 6–1 to lift the Castle Cup in 1972. in 1973 Dynamos were beaten 1–0. In 1991 Chipangano lifted the Zifa Cup beating Cranborne Bullets 3–1.

Hwange were most recently promoted to the Zimbabwe top flight in 2018 after spending one year in the second division after a 2016 relegation.

They were relegated from the 2024 Zimbabwe Premier Soccer League.

== Honours ==
- Zimbabwean Cup: 3

1970, 1973, 1991
