= ZPC Kariba F.C. =

Association football club in Zimbabwe

ZPC Kariba
- Full name: Zimbabwe Power Company Kariba F.C.
- Nickname: Kauya Katuru turu
- Founded: 1978; 48 years ago
- Ground: Nyamhunga Stadium, Kariba
- Capacity: 5,000
- Chairman: Cosmas Zindoga
- Coach: Darlington Dodo
- League: Zimbabwe Premier Soccer League
- 2025: 8th of 16
Home colours

Zimbabwe Power Company Kariba F.C. is a Zimbabwean football club based in Kariba. They play in the top division of Zimbabwean football, the Zimbabwe Premier Soccer League.

== History ==
The history of the team can be traced back to the 1970s where a group of Zimbabwe Electricity South Authority (ZESA) and Zambezi River Authority (ZRA) members led by Dzingai James Kazizi, his friends Mambovatema and Kanyenze among other senior members who loved football organised for establish social soccer for employees. The seniors who were passionate about soccer, led to the establishment of a ZRA team while ZESA established its own. The two teams would play weekend social soccer matches together until they agreed to combine forces and establish a formidable force nicknamed "Kauya katuruturu" representing the mighty force of the Zambezi River and the super power of hydro-electric power.

Notable in the 1990s was the goalkeeper nicknamed "Chimupaga", famous for taking penalty kicks.

Katuruturu evolved over time to be ZPC Kariba.

=== Coaching history ===
On 8 May 2015, SAUL Chaminuka was sacked as manager of ZPC Kariba and his assistant manager Godfrey Tamirepi was sacked as well.

On 22 January 2015, The former Hardbody goalkeeper coach Tembo Chuma joined ZPC Kariba.

On 23 January 2019, ZPC Kariba sacked assistant coach Mabelo Njekwa and manager Kennedy Nagoli ahead of the start of the new Premiership season.

On 4 January 2019, Godfrey Tamirepi was appointed ZPC Kariba coach.

== Stadium ==
Currently the team plays at the Nyamhunga Stadium in Kariba.
