= Triangle United F.C. =

Zimbabwean football club

- Full name: Triangle United Football Club
- Nickname: Sugar Sugar Boyz
- Founded: 1972
- Ground: Gibbo Stadium, Triangle
- Capacity: 3,000
- Manager: Shame White
- League: Zimbabwe Premier Soccer League
- 2025: 14th of 18
| Home colours | Away colours |

Triangle United Football Club is a Zimbabwean football club based in Triangle. They play in the top division of Zimbabwean football, the Zimbabwe Premier Soccer League.

The players play in white and green kit, previously they played in red shirts and white shorts.

== Stadium ==
The team plays at the Gibbo Stadium.

== Rivals ==
Chiredzi FC is their main and local rival. Their rivalry can be traced back to when both teams played in Division 1.
