= Chicken Inn F.C. =

Zimbabwean football club

- Full name: Chicken Inn Football Club
- Nickname: The Gamecocks
- Founded: 1997 or 2004
- Ground: Luveve Stadium, Bulawayo
- Capacity: 8,000
- League: Castle Lager Premier Soccer League
- 2025: 12th of 18
- Website: chickeninnfc.co.zw
Home colours	Away colours

Chicken Inn is a Zimbabwean football club based in Bulawayo. They play in the top division of Zimbabwean football, the Zimbabwe Premier Soccer League.

The team's name comes from its major sponsor, a large Zimbabwean fast food retailer.

== History ==
Chicken Inn was formed either in 1997 or in 2004 as Bakers Inn. Their league title in 2015 was the first in their history following promotion to the top flight in 2011.

Head coach Joey Antipas joined the club in 2013, and successfully guided them into the CAF Champions League for the first time in their history after a league campaign that saw them lose just five out of 30 matches.

== Honours ==
- Zimbabwe Premier Soccer League
  - Champions (1): 2015
- Zimbabwean Independence Trophy
  - Champions (1): 2016
- NetOne Charity Shield
  - Champions (1): 2013
