= Zimbabwe Premier Soccer League =

Zimbabwean football league

- Founded: 1980; 46 years ago
- Country: Zimbabwe (18 teams)
- Confederation: CAF
- Number of clubs: 18
- Level on pyramid: 1
- Relegation to: Zimbabwean Division One
- Domestic cup(s): Chibuku Super Cup
- International cup(s): Champions League; Confederation Cup
- Current champions: Scottland (1st title) (2025)
- Most championships: Dynamos (21 titles)
- Broadcaster(s): ZTN (live matches)
- Current: 2026 Zimbabwe Premier Soccer League

Zimbabwe Premier Soccer League is the top professional division of the Zimbabwe Football Association. It was founded in 1980, as a successor to the 1962 formed Rhodesia National Football League. It is currently sponsored by Delta Beverages under the Castle Lager brand and hence is known as Castle Lager Premier Soccer League. The current sponsorship deal runs from 2011 and is worth $3.6 million.

The league consists of 18 teams that play a total of 34 matches each. The season runs from April to November. Most matches are played during weekends on Saturdays and Sundays. Postponed matches are played midweek. At the end of the season four teams are relegated into the lower division and an equal number promoted.

The winner qualifies for the CAF Champions League, while the Cup of Zimbabwe winners gains entry into the CAF Confederation Cup, though clubs from the league do not always participate if they qualify.

The winner also plays the winners of the Chibuku Cup in the Castle Challenge Cup at the beginning of the following season.

== Overview ==
=== Locations ===
Location of teams in the 2025 Zimbabwe Premier Soccer League.

=== Top goalscorers ===
Year	Best scorers	Team	Goals
1996	(Zimbabwe) Alois Bunjira	CAPS United	23
1999–2000	(Zambia) Chewe Mulenga	Railstars	24
2000	(Zimbabwe) Thomas Makwasha	Shabanie	16
2001	(Zimbabwe) Tapfuma Gahadzikwa	CAPS United	19
2002	(Zimbabwe) Zenzo Moyo	Highlanders	21
2003	(Zimbabwe) Sageby Sandaka	Amazulu	17
2004	(Zimbabwe) Leonard Tsipa	CAPS United	18
2005	(Zimbabwe) Edmore Mufema	Motor Action	17
2006	(Zimbabwe) Ralph Matema	Highlanders	19
2007	(Zimbabwe) Cuthbert Malajila	Chapungu United	15
2008	(Zimbabwe) Evans Chikwaikwai	Njube Sundowns	23
2009	(Zimbabwe) Nyasha Mushekwi	CAPS United	21
2010	(Zimbabwe) Norman Maroto	Gunners	22
2011	(Zimbabwe) Rodreck Mutuma	Dynamos	14
2012	(Zimbabwe) Nelson Mazivisa	Shabanie Mine	18
2013	(Zimbabwe) Tendai Ndoro	Chicken Inn	18
2015	(Zimbabwe) Knox Mutizwa	Highlanders	14
2016	(Zimbabwe) Leonard Tsipa	CAPS United	11
2017	(Zimbabwe) Mukhoshi Sibanda	Bantu Rovers	7
2021–22	(Zimbabwe) William Manondo	CAPS United	17
2023	(Zimbabwe) Fortune Binzi	Manica Diamonds	8
2024	(Zimbabwe) Lynoth Chikuhwa	Highlanders	17
2025	(Zimbabwe) Washington Navaya	TelOne	17

== Sponsorship ==
From 2011, the Premier Soccer League has had title sponsorship rights sold to Delta Beverages, who sponsor the league under their Castle Lager brand. The deal has been extended until 2026. Originally a lower income level, in 2014 Delta Beverages upped their sponsorship to $3.6 million.

Period	Sponsor	Name
2011–	Delta Beverages, Castle Lager	Castle Lager Premier Soccer League

== Media coverage ==
Previously, the Premier Soccer League had a television deal with SuperSport who broadcast matches regularly across Africa.

In 2021, the league signed a deal with ZTN (Zimpapers Television Network) to air live Castle Lager PSL and Chibuku Super Cup matches. ZTN Prime, their newest free-to-air television network will air the matches and their social media platforms as well.

== Lack of goalscoring ==
As of end of the 2024 season, in the eleven seasons since 2012, when champions Dynamos scored 58 goals in a 30-game season, only three teams have scored more than 50 goals, in spite of the season length being increased to 34 games. This relative lack of goalscoring has been attributed to poor pitch quality, a defensive coaching attitude, and a lack of resources and data-driven training.

== See also ==
- Soccer Star of the Year
