= List of colleges in Zimbabwe =

This is a list of colleges in Zimbabwe.

- Bulawayo Polytechnic
- Chinhoyi Technical Teachers College
- CITMA College
- Dimbangombe College of Wildlife, Agriculture and Conservation Management
- Gweru Polytechnic
- Harare Polytechnic
- Herentials College
- ILSA College
- Kwekwe Polytechnic
- Lighthouse College
- Masvingo Polytechnic
- Mkoba Teachers College
- Mutare Polytechnic
- Mutare Teachers' College
- Phoenix College
- Speciss College
- St. Peter's College of Theology and Business
- Trust Academy
- Zimbabwe College of Music
- Zimbabwe Institute of Legal Studies
- Zimbabwe Woman Empowerment Institution

== See also ==
- Education in Zimbabwe
- Schools in Zimbabwe
- Levels of education: higher education, foundation degree and further education
- List of universities in Zimbabwe
