= List of British casualties during the Iraq War =

During the Iraq War, 179 British service personnel and at least three UK Government civilian staff died.

Many more were wounded. Of the more than 183 fatalities, 138 personnel were classified as having been killed in hostile circumstances, with the remaining 44 losing their lives as a result of illness, accidents/friendly fire, or suicide. The first casualties were sustained on 21 March 2003, with the bloodiest single day of the campaign being 30 January 2005 when a Royal Air Force Lockheed C-130 Hercules transport aircraft was shot down between Baghdad and Balad, killing all 10 servicemen on board. Steven Roberts (2nd Royal Tank Regiment) is recorded as the first soldier killed in the operation (albeit by friendly fire); two Royal Engineers were killed the previous day by a hostile crowd. Full non-fatal casualty records are currently only available for the period after 1 January 2006. From that date until the end of operations, 3,598 British personnel were wounded, injured or fell ill (315 wounded in action), 1,971 of whom required aeromedical evacuation.

== British dead (by service) ==
=== Royal Navy ===
- Royal Navy – 8

Total: 8

=== Royal Marines ===
- Royal Marines – 11

Total: 11

=== British Army ===
- Household Cavalry Regiment – 3
- Royal Armoured Corps
  - 1st Queen's Dragoon Guards – 2
  - Royal Scots Dragoon Guards – 2
  - 9th/12th Royal Lancers – 1
  - King's Royal Hussars – 1
  - Queen's Royal Lancers – 5
  - Royal Tank Regiment – 3
- Royal Regiment of Artillery – 8
- Corps of Royal Engineers – 4
- Royal Corps of Signals – 5
- The Infantry
  - Guards Division
    - Coldstream Guards – 2
    - Scots Guards – 1
    - Irish Guards – 4
  - Scottish Division
    - Royal Highland Fusiliers – 1
    - Black Watch – 7
    - The Highlanders – 1
    - Argyll and Sutherland Highlanders – 1
    - 52nd Lowland Regiment – 2
    - Royal Regiment of Scotland – 2
  - Queen's Division
    - Princess of Wales's Royal Regiment – 3
    - Royal Regiment of Fusiliers – 4
    - Royal Anglian Regiment – 2
  - King's Division
    - Duke of Lancaster's Regiment – 7
    - Queen's Lancashire Regiment – 1
    - Yorkshire Regiment – 1
    - Tyne-Tees Regiment – 1
  - Prince of Wales' Division
    - Staffordshire Regiment – 4
    - Royal Welch Fusiliers – 1
    - Royal Regiment of Wales – 1
    - Royal Welsh – 3
  - Light Division
    - Devonshire and Dorset Light Infantry – 1
    - Light Infantry – 3
    - Royal Green Jackets – 1
    - The Rifles – 8
  - Parachute Regiment – 3
- Special Air Service – 8
- Army Air Corps – 2
- Royal Logistic Corps – 5
- Royal Army Medical Corps – 3
- Corps of Royal Electrical and Mechanical Engineers – 5
- Adjutant General's Corps
  - Royal Military Police – 12
- Intelligence Corps – 3

Total: 137

=== Royal Air Force ===
- RAF Strike Command – 1
- RAF Benson – 2
  - No. 33 Squadron RAF (Puma HC.1) – 1
- RAF Lyneham – 3
  - No. 47 Squadron RAF (Hercules C.1/C.3) – 5
- RAF Marham
  - No. IX (B) Squadron (Tornado GR.4) – 2
- RAF Aldergrove
  - No. 230 Squadron RAF (Puma HC.1) – 1
- RAF Brize Norton – 1
- RAF Regiment
  - 1 Squadron – 3
  - 16 Squadron – 1
  - 504 Squadron RAuxAF – 1
- Royal Air Force Police – 1

Total: 22

=== UK government civilian personnel ===
- Ministry of Defence Fire Service – 1
- Department of Health and Social Care – 1
- Foreign and Commonwealth Office (contractor) – 2

Total: 4

== British dead (rank – name – age – unit – incident – date) ==
(NB: IED = improvised explosive device. RTA = road traffic accident. Non-hostile = friendly fire.)

=== 2003 ===
Combat fatalities: 40, other fatalities: 13, wounded in action: n/a, other injured: n/a.

Rank	Name	Age	Unit	Cause of death	Location	Date
Private	Ryan Thomas		Royal Regiment of Wales	RTA		6 November 2003
Corporal	Ian Plank		Royal Marines	Small arms fire		31 October 2003
Sergeant	John Nightingale		Royal Logistic Corps	Accident		23 September 2003
Fusilier	Russell Beeston		52nd Lowland Regiment	Killed in action		27 August 2003
Major	Matthew Titchener		Royal Military Police	Small arms fire		23 August 2003
Warrant Officer Class 2	Colin Wall		Royal Military Police	Small arms fire		23 August 2003
Corporal	Dewi Pritchard		Royal Military Police	Small arms fire		23 August 2003
Captain	David Jones		Queen's Lancashire Regiment	IED		14 August 2003
Private	Jason Smith		52nd Lowland Regiment	Illness		13 August 2003
Captain	James Linton		Royal Artillery	Illness		18 July 2003
Sergeant	Simon Hamilton-Jewell		Royal Military Police	Killed by crowd		24 June 2003
Corporal	Russell Aston		Royal Military Police	Killed by crowd		24 June 2003
Corporal	Paul Long		Royal Military Police	Killed by crowd		24 June 2003
Corporal	Simon Miller		Royal Military Police	Killed by crowd		24 June 2003
Lance Corporal	Benjamin Hyde		Royal Military Police	Killed by crowd		24 June 2003
Lance Corporal	Thomas Keys		Royal Military Police	Killed by crowd		24 June 2003
	Leonard Harvey		Ministry of Defence Fire Service	Illness		22 May 2003
Corporal	David Shepherd		Royal Air Force Police	Illness		19 May 2003
Gunner	Duncan Pritchard		Royal Air Force Regiment	RTA		8 May 2003
Private	Andrew Kelly		Parachute Regiment	Accident		6 May 2003
Lance Corporal	James McCue		Royal Electrical and Mechanical Engineers	Explosion		30 April 2003
Fusilier	Kelan Turrington		Royal Regiment of Fusiliers	Friendly fire		6 April 2003
Lance Corporal	Ian Malone (Note: Ian Malone (died 2003) was a citizen of Ireland)		Irish Guards	Killed in action		6 April 2003
Piper	Christopher Muzvuru (Note: Christopher Muzvuru (died 2003) was a citizen of the Republic of Zimbabwe)		Irish Guards	Killed in action		6 April 2003
Lieutenant	Alexander Tweedie		Household Cavalry Regiment	Vehicle accident		1 April 2003
Lance Corporal	Karl Shearer		Household Cavalry Regiment	Vehicle accident		1 April 2003
Staff Sergeant	Chris Muir		Royal Logistic Corps	EOD operation		31 March 2003
Lance Corporal	Shaun Brierly		Royal Signals	RTA		30 March 2003
Marine	Christopher Maddison		Royal Marines	Friendly fire		30 March 2003
Major	Steve Ballard		Royal Marines	Illness		30 March 2003
Lance Corporal of Horse	Matty Hull		Household Cavalry Regiment	Friendly fire		28 March 2003
Corporal	Stephen Allbutt		Queen's Royal Lancers	Friendly fire		25 March 2003
Trooper	David Clarke		Queen's Royal Lancers	Friendly fire		25 March 2003
Lance Corporal	Barry Stephen		Black Watch	Killed in action		24 March 2003
Sergeant	Steven Roberts		2nd Royal Tank Regiment	Friendly fire		24 March 2003
Sapper	Luke Allsopp		Royal Engineers	Killed by crowd		23 March 2003
Staff Sergeant	Simon Cullingworth		Royal Engineers	Killed by crowd		23 March 2003
Flight Lieutenant	Kevin Main		Royal Air Force	Aircraft shot down 'friendly fire'		23 March 2003
Flight Lieutenant	David Rhys Williams		Royal Air Force	Aircraft shot down 'friendly fire'		23 March 2003
Lieutenant	Philip Green		Royal Navy	Helicopter crash		22 March 2003
Lieutenant	Antony King		Royal Navy	Helicopter crash		22 March 2003
Lieutenant	Marc Lawrence		Royal Navy	Helicopter crash		22 March 2003
Lieutenant	Philip West		Royal Navy	Helicopter crash		22 March 2003
Lieutenant	James Williams		Royal Navy	Helicopter crash		22 March 2003
Lieutenant	Andrew Wilson		Royal Navy	Helicopter crash		22 March 2003
Colour Sergeant	John Cecil		Royal Marines	Helicopter crash	Kuwait	21 March 2003
Lance Bombardier	Llywelyn Evans		Royal Artillery	Helicopter crash	Kuwait	21 March 2003
Captain	Philip Stuart Guy		Royal Marines	Helicopter crash	Kuwait	21 March 2003
Marine	Sholto Hedenskog		Royal Marines	Helicopter crash	Kuwait	21 March 2003
Sergeant	Les Hehir		Royal Artillery	Helicopter crash	Kuwait	21 March 2003
Operator Maintainer	Ian Seymour		Royal Navy	Helicopter crash	Kuwait	21 March 2003
Warrant Officer Class 2	Mark Stratford		Royal Marines	Helicopter crash	Kuwait	21 March 2003
Major	Jason Ward		Royal Marines	Helicopter crash	Kuwait	21 March 2003

=== 2004 ===
Combat fatalities: 10, other fatalities: 12, wounded in action: n/a, Other Injured: n/a.

Rank	Name	Age	Unit	Cause of death	Location	Date
Sergeant	Paul Connolly		Royal Electrical and Mechanical Engineers	'Found dead'		26 December 2004
Private	Pita Tukutukuwaqa		Black Watch	IED		8 November 2004
Sergeant	Stuart Gray		Black Watch	Suicide car-bomb		4 November 2004
Private	Paul Lowe		Black Watch	Suicide car-bomb		4 November 2004
Private	Scott McArdle		Black Watch	Suicide car-bomb		4 November 2004
Staff Sergeant	Denise Michelle Rose		Royal Military Police	Suicide		31 October 2004
Private	Kevin McHale		Black Watch	RTA		29 October 2004
Corporal	Marc Taylor		Royal Electrical and Mechanical Engineers	IED		28 September 2004
Gunner	David Lawrence		Royal Artillery	IED		28 September 2004
Fusilier	Stephen Jones		Royal Welch Fusiliers	RTA		10 September 2004
Lance Corporal	Paul Thomas		The Light Infantry	Small arms fire		17 August 2004
Private	Marc Ferns		Black Watch	IED		12 August 2004
Private	Lee O'Callaghan		The Princess of Wales's Royal Regiment	Attack on vehicles		9 August 2004
Private	Christopher Rayment		The Princess of Wales's Royal Regiment	accident		4 August 2004
Flight Lieutenant	Kristian Gover		Royal Air Force	Helicopter accident		19 July 2004
Fusilier	Gordon Gentle		Royal Highland Fusiliers	IED		28 June 2004
Corporal	Richard Ivell		Royal Electrical and Mechanical Engineers	Accident		12 February 2004
Sapper	Robert Thompson		Royal Engineers	Accident		31 January 2004
Rifleman	Vincent Windsor		Royal Green Jackets	RTA		21 January 2004
Lance Corporal	Andrew Craw		Argyll and Sutherland Highlanders	Range accident		7 January 2004
Major	James Stenner		Special Air Service	RTA		1 January 2004
Sergeant	Norman Patterson		Special Air Service	RTA		1 January 2004
Mr.	Mike McGovern		Ministry of Health	Illness		May 2004
Mr.	Robert Morgan		Foreign and Commonwealth Office	IED		April 2004
Mr.	Mark Carman		Foreign and Commonwealth Office (contractor)	IED		April 2004

=== 2005 ===
Combat fatalities: 20, other fatalities: 3, wounded in action: n/a, other injured: n/a.

Rank	Name	Age	Unit	Cause of death	Location	Date
Sergeant	John Jones		Royal Regiment of Fusiliers	IED		20 November 2005
Sergeant	Chris Hickey		Coldstream Guards	IED		18 November 2005
Captain	Ken Masters		Royal Military Police	Suicide		15 October 2005
Major	Matthew Bacon		Intelligence Corps	IED		11 September 2005
Fusilier	Donal Anthony Meade		Royal Regiment of Fusiliers	IED		5 September 2005
Fusilier	Stephen Robert Manning		Royal Regiment of Fusiliers	IED		5 September 2005
Second Lieutenant	Richard Shearer		Staffordshire Regiment	IED		16 July 2005
Private	Leon Spicer		Staffordshire Regiment	IED		16 July 2005
Private	Phillip Hewett		Staffordshire Regiment	IED		16 July 2005
Signaller	Paul William Didsbury		Royal Signals	Accident		29 June 2005
Lance Corporal	Alan Brackenbury		The King's Royal Hussars	IED		29 May 2005
Guardsman	Anthony John Wakefield		Coldstream Guards	IED		2 May 2005
Private	Mark Dobson		Tyne-Tees Regiment	Suicide		28 March 2005
Squadron Leader	Patrick Marshall		Royal Air Force	Aircraft shot down		30 January 2005
Flight Lieutenant	David Stead		Royal Air Force	Aircraft shot down		30 January 2005
Flight Lieutenant	Andrew Smith		Royal Air Force	Aircraft shot down		30 January 2005
Flight Lieutenant	Paul Pardoel		Royal Air Force	Aircraft shot down		30 January 2005
Master Engineer	Gary Nicolson		Royal Air Force	Aircraft shot down		30 January 2005
Chief Technician	Richard Brown		Royal Air Force	Aircraft shot down		30 January 2005
Flight Sergeant	Mark Gibson		Royal Air Force	Aircraft shot down		30 January 2005
Sergeant	Robert O'Connor		Royal Air Force	Aircraft shot down		30 January 2005
Corporal	David Williams		Royal Air Force	Aircraft shot down		30 January 2005
Lance Corporal	Steven Jones		Royal Signals	Aircraft shot down		30 January 2005

=== 2006 ===
Combat fatalities: 27, other fatalities: 2, wounded in action: 93, other injured: 1209.

Rank	Name	Age	Unit	Cause of death	Location	Date
Sergeant	Graham Hesketh		Duke of Lancaster's Regiment	IED		28 December 2006
Sergeant	Jonathan Hollingsworth		Special Air Service	Small arms fire		24 November 2006
Warrant Officer Class 2	Lee Hopkins		Royal Signals	IED		12 November 2006
Staff Sergeant	Sharron Elliott		Intelligence Corps	IED		12 November 2006
Corporal	Ben Nowak		Royal Marines	IED		12 November 2006
Marine	Jason Hylton		Royal Marines	IED		12 November 2006
Kingsman	Jamie Lee Hancock		Duke of Lancaster's Regiment	Small arms fire		6 November 2006
Lieutenant	Tom Tanswell		Royal Artillery	RTA		27 October 2006
Lance Corporal	Dennis Brady		Royal Army Medical Corps	Mortar fire		1 October 2006
Gunner	Lee Thornton		Royal Artillery	Small arms fire		7 September 2006
Gunner	Samuela Vanua		Royal Artillery	IED		4 September 2006
Gunner	Stephen Robert Wright		Royal Artillery	IED		4 September 2006
Corporal	Matthew Cornish		The Light Infantry	Mortar fire		1 August 2006
Corporal	John Cosby		Devonshire and Dorset Light Infantry	friendly fire		16 July 2006
Lieutenant	Tom Mildinhall		1st The Queen's Dragoon Guards	IED		28 May 2006
Lance Corporal	Paul Farrelly		1st The Queen's Dragoon Guards	IED		28 May 2006
Private	Joseva Lewaicei		Royal Anglian Regiment	IED		13 May 2006
Private	Adam Morris		Royal Anglian Regiment	IED		13 May 2006
Wing Commander	John Coxen		Royal Air Force	Helicopter shot down		6 May 2006
Lieutenant Commander	Darren Chapman		Royal Navy	Helicopter shot down		6 May 2006
Captain	David Dobson		Army Air Corps	Helicopter shot down		6 May 2006
Flight Lieutenant	Sarah-Jayne Mulvihill		Royal Air Force	Helicopter shot down		6 May 2006
Marine	Paul Collins		Royal Marines	Helicopter shot down		6 May 2006
Lieutenant	Richard Palmer		Royal Scots Dragoon Guards	IED		16 April 2006
Captain	Richard Holmes		Parachute Regiment	IED		28 February 2006
Private	Lee Ellis		Parachute Regiment	IED		28 February 2006
Trooper	Carl Smith		9th/12th Royal Lancers	RTA		2 February 2006
Corporal	Gordon Alexander Pritchard		Royal Scots Dragoon Guards	IED		31 January 2006
Lance Corporal	Allan Douglas		The Highlanders	Small arms fire		30 January 2006

=== 2007 ===
Combat fatalities: 37, other fatalities: 10, wounded in action: 202, other injured: 1098.

Rank	Name	Age	Unit	Cause of death	Location	Date
Guardsman	Stephen Ferguson		Scots Guards	RTA		13 December 2007
Trooper	Lee Fitzsimmons		Special Air Service	Helicopter crash		20 November 2007
Sergeant	John Battersby		Special Air Service	Helicopter crash		20 November 2007
Lance Corporal	Sarah Holmes		Royal Logistic Corps	RTA		14 October 2007
Sergeant	Mark Stansfield		Royal Logistic Corps	Accident		21 September 2007
Sergeant	Eddie Collins		Special Air Service	'Hostile action'		5 September 2007
Lance Sergeant	Chris Casey		Irish Guards	IED		9 August 2007
Lance Corporal	Kirk Redpath		Irish Guards	IED		9 August 2007
Leading Aircraftman	Martin Beard		RAF Regiment	Small arms fire		7 August 2007
Private	Craig Barber		Royal Welsh	Small arms fire		6 August 2007
Corporal	Steve Edwards		Royal Tank Regiment	IED		1 August 2007
Lance Corporal	Timothy Darren Flowers		Royal Electrical and Mechanical Engineers	Mortar fire		21 July 2007
Senior Aircraftman	Christopher Dunsmore		RAF Regiment	Mortar fire		19 July 2007
Senior Aircraftman	Peter McFerran		RAF Regiment	Mortar fire		19 July 2007
Senior Aircraftman	Matthew Caulwell		RAF Regiment	Mortar fire		19 July 2007
Corporal	Christopher Read		Royal Military Police	Small arms fire		7 July 2007
Lance Corporal	Ryan Francis		Royal Welsh	IED		7 July 2007
Rifleman	Edward Vakabua		The Rifles	friendly fire		6 July 2007
Corporal	Paul Joszko		Royal Welsh	IED		28 June 2007
Private	Jamie Kerr		Royal Regiment of Scotland	IED		28 June 2007
Private	Scott Kennedy		Royal Regiment of Scotland	IED		28 June 2007
Corporal	John Rigby		The Rifles	IED		22 June 2007
Major	Paul Harding		The Rifles	Mortar fire		20 June 2007
Lance Corporal	James Cartwright		2nd Royal Tank Regiment	RTA		16 June 2007
Corporal	Rodney Wilson		The Rifles	Small arms fire		7 June 2007
Corporal	Jeremy Brookes		The Rifles	Small arms fire		21 May 2007
Private	Kevin Thompson		Royal Logistic Corps	IED		6 May 2007
Major	Nick Bateson		Royal Signals	RTA		1 May 2007
Rifleman	Paul Donnachie		The Rifles	Small arms fire		29 April 2007
Kingsman	Alan Joseph Jones		Duke of Lancaster's Regiment	Small arms fire		23 April 2007
Corporal	Ben Leaning		Queen's Royal Lancers	IED		19 April 2007
Trooper	Kristen Turton		Queen's Royal Lancers	IED		19 April 2007
Sergeant	Mark J. McLaren		Royal Air Force	Helicopter crash		15 April 2007
Colour Sergeant	Mark Lawrence Powell		Special Air Service	Helicopter crash		15 April 2007
Second Lieutenant	Joanna Yorke Dyer		Intelligence Corps	IED		5 April 2007
Corporal	Kris O'Neill		Royal Army Medical Corps	IED		5 April 2007
Private	Eleanor Dlugosz		Royal Army Medical Corps	IED		5 April 2007
Kingsman	Adam James Smith		Duke of Lancaster's Regiment	IED		5 April 2007
Rifleman	Aaron Lincoln		The Rifles	Small arms fire		2 April 2007
Kingsman	Danny John Wilson		Duke of Lancaster's Regiment	Small arms fire		1 April 2007
Private	Jonathon Wysoczan		Staffordshire Regiment	Small arms fire		3 March 2007
Rifleman	Daniel Lee Coffey		The Rifles	Small arms fire		27 February 2007
Private	Luke Daniel Simpson		Yorkshire Regiment	IED		9 February 2007
Second Lieutenant	Jonathan Bracho-Cooke		Duke of Lancaster's Regiment	IED		5 February 2007
Private	Michael Tench		The Light Infantry	IED		21 January 2007
Kingsman	Alexander William Green		Duke of Lancaster's Regiment	Small arms fire		13 January 2007
Sergeant	Wayne Rees		Queen's Royal Lancers	RTA		7 January 2007

=== 2008 ===
Combat fatalities: 2, other fatalities: 2, wounded in action: 20, other injured: 758.

Rank	Name	Age	Unit	Cause of death	Location	Date
Corporal	Lee Churcher		Royal Engineers	Suicide		11 December 2008
Lance Corporal	David Kenneth Wilson		Army Air Corps	Gunshot (non-hostile)		4 December 2008
Sergeant	Nick Brown		Special Air Service	Small arms fire		26 March 2008
Sergeant	Duane Barwood		Royal Air Force	Rocket attack		29 February 2008

=== 2009 ===
Combat fatalities: 0, other fatalities: 1, wounded in action: 0, other injured: 218.

Rank	Name	Age	Unit	Cause of death	Location	Date
Private	Ryan Wrathall		Princess of Wales's Royal Regiment	Suicide		12 February 2009
