= Bulawayo Polytechnic College =

Coordinates: 20.160363°S 28.593293°E

Bulawayo Polytechnic

Location
- Bulawayo, Zimbabwe

Information
- Established: 1927; 98 years ago
- Principal: Gilbert Mabasa

Bulawayo Polytechnic is an academic institution established in 1927 in Bulawayo, Zimbabwe, initially as a technical school. The current main campus on Park Road in Suburbs was established in 1942. The Division of Art & Design is based at a campus on George Silundika Street in the central business district. This campus also offers training for artisans in bricklaying, plumbing, carpentry, joinery, and wood machining. (The polytechnic is sometimes wrongfully called Bulawayo Polytechnic College instead of Bulawayo Polytechnic.)

The current principal of Bulawayo Polytechnic is Mrs Chiedza Masanganise.

== Academics ==
The polytechnic provides higher education qualifications including a national diploma in civil engineering. It is one of the few polytechnics in the country that produces civil engineering technicians. Some of the programs offered include mechanical engineering, electrical engineering, automotive engineering, information technology, library and information science, records management and biotechnology as well as commerce programs such as marketing management, purchasing and supply, banking and finance, and secretarial studies among others.

It has played host to exchange students from many countries including the United States and western Europe. It provides technical and vocational education for the nation. Most of the students who graduated, especially in technical programs such as engineering in the early 2000s when the Zimbabwean economy started slumping, have migrated to neighboring South Africa where the demand for technical workers is high.

The polytechnic has been attempting to become a University College but fell out of favour in preference to the establishment of the National University of Science and Technology; NUST used Bulawayo Polytechnic facilities to get started. The polytechnic is now offering two Bachelor of Technology degrees in Environmental Health and Water Resource Engineering in conjunction with NUST.

The 2016 Architectural Technology National Certificate class was one of the best classes who attained 85% pass.

== Student politics ==
The most successful student leaders are Nkululeko Sibanda and Blessing Vava. Nkululeko Sibanda was one of the two students to be expelled from college by then Principal Mwadiwa for student activism after Swithern Chirowodza, in 2002. Swithern was expelled for labelling Mwadiwa as corrupt and Nkululeko Sibanda on the orders of the Minister of Higher Education following a meeting he had had with the Minister in Harare. He was part of the SRC led by Kwanisai Mafa who stepped down after he had allegedly misappropriated funds leaving Blessing Sibanda as president. Blessing was against the highjacking of the Union by political parties and was opposed to destruction of college property. Blessing later stepped down arguing that getting bed with political parties would erode the council's power to challenge corruption and incompetence by politicians. This was the first council from Bulawayo to challenge the Zimbabwean government which prompted the then minister of Higher Education to order the expulsion of the most radical student leaders in the council, Nkululeko Sibanda and Swithern Chirowodza. Sibanda became the president of the Zimbabwe National Students Union (ZINASU). In 2001 he was voted the best student union leader by the Union, receiving the Henrick Visa Award and certificate. He is the only person to lead ZINASU without being a university student. During his term of office, ZINASU won the International Student Peace Prize in Norway. Sibanda now holds a PhD from the University of Huddersfield in the United Kingdom and continues to campaign for human rights and democracy across the global.

Blessing Vava, who now holds a Masters from Wits University in South Africa was Students Union President in 2006-7, was named the most exemplary student in 2006 and is also a national and international activist having because the ZINASU information guru and lead many organisations including the National Constitutional Assembly. The militant student leader led protests against high tuition fees and in support of students rights. This resulted in him being arrested on numerous occasions by the law enforcement agents in Zimbabwe, and he was subsequently denied registration to complete his studies. He is the spokesman for the Zimbabwe National Students Union.

== List of principals ==
The following is a list of principals of Bulawayo Polytechnic:

- Mr. P. N. Gifford: 1927 - 1947
- Mr. H. J. Sutherby: 1947 - 1959
- Eng. J. H. Bowman: 1979 - 1984
- Eng. G. J. Crutchley: 1985 - 1988
- Mr.A.M. Ncube: 1989 - 1996
- Mr. G. S. Evans (Acting): 1996 - 1997
- Mr. A. I. C. Mwadiwa: 1997 - 2004
- Mr. M. A. Zengeya (Acting): 2004 - 2004
- Mr. G. M. Mabasa: 2004 - 2005
- Dr. T. P. Ndlovu: 2005 - 2014
- Mr.G.M. Mabasa: 2014 - 2019
- Mrs Chiedza Masanganise: 2021 -
