= Police Service of Northern Ireland =

Police Service of Northern Ireland Seirbhís Póilíneachta Thuaisceart Éireann Polis Service o Norlin Airlan
- The Service Emblem
- Abbreviation: PSNI
- Motto: Keeping People Safe

Agency overview
- Formed: 4 November 2001; 25 years ago
- Preceding agency: Royal Ulster Constabulary
- Annual budget: £844.5 million (2024/25)
- Legal personality: Police service

Jurisdictional structure
- National agency: Northern Ireland
- Operations jurisdiction: Northern Ireland
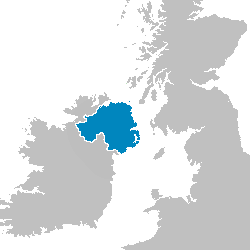
- Police Service of Northern Ireland area
- Area: 14,130 km^{2} (5,460 sq mi)
- Population: 1,903,175
- Governing body: Northern Ireland Executive
- Constituting instrument: Police (Northern Ireland) Act 2000
- General nature: Civilian police

Operational structure
- Overseen by: Northern Ireland Policing Board
- Headquarters: Belfast
- Police Officers: 6,341; 138 part-time
- Police Staffs: 2,309
- Agency executives: Jon Boutcher, Chief constable; Bobby Singleton, Deputy chief constable; Pamela McCreedy, Chief operating officer
- Departments: 12: People & Organisational Development; Corporate Services; Strategic Planning and Performance; Justice; Operational Support; Local Policing; Crime; Professional Standards; Strategic Communications & Engagement Department; Staff Offices; Secretariat; Projects
- Areas: 4 (11 District)

Facilities
- Stations: 32
- Watercrafts: Yes
- Aircraft: 3 helicopters 1 fixed-wing
- Dogs: 28

Website
- www.psni.police.uk

The Police Service of Northern Ireland (PSNI; Irish: Seirbhís Póilíneachta Thuaisceart Éireann; Ulster Scots: Polis Service o Norlin Airlan) is the police service responsible for law enforcement and the prevention of crime within Northern Ireland.

It is the successor to the Royal Ulster Constabulary (RUC) after it was reformed and renamed in 2001 on the recommendation of the Patten Report.

The PSNI is the third-largest police service in the United Kingdom in terms of officer numbers (after the Metropolitan Police and Police Scotland) and the second-largest in terms of geographic area of responsibility, after Police Scotland. The PSNI is approximately half the size of Garda Síochána in terms of officer numbers.

== Background ==
As part of the Good Friday Agreement, there was an agreement to introduce a new police service initially based on the body of constables of the RUC. As part of the reform, an Independent Commission on Policing for Northern Ireland (the Patten Commission) was set up, and the RUC was replaced by the PSNI on 4 November 2001. The Police (Northern Ireland) Act 2000 named the new police service as the Police Service of Northern Ireland (incorporating the Royal Ulster Constabulary); shortened to Police Service of Northern Ireland for operational purposes.

The RUC was a militarised police force and played a key role in policing the violent conflict known as the Troubles. Initially, Sinn Féin, which represented about a quarter of Northern Ireland voters at the time, refused to endorse the PSNI until the Patten Commission's recommendations were implemented in full. However, as part of the St Andrews Agreement, Sinn Féin announced its full acceptance of the PSNI in January 2007. All major political parties in Northern Ireland now support the PSNI.

== Organisation ==
The senior officer in charge of the PSNI is its chief constable. The chief constable is appointed by the Northern Ireland Policing Board, subject to the approval of the Minister of Justice for Northern Ireland. The Chief Constable of Northern Ireland is the third-highest paid police officer in the UK (after the Commissioner and Deputy Commissioner of the Metropolitan Police). The current chief constable is Jon Boutcher. He was appointed on an interim basis after the resignation of Simon Byrne in September 2023 and was subsequently confirmed as chief constable on 7 November 2023.

The police area is divided into eight districts, each headed by a chief superintendent. Districts are divided into areas, each commanded by a chief inspector; these in turn are divided into sectors, each commanded by an inspector. In recent years, under new structural reforms, some chief inspectors command more than one area as the PSNI strives to make savings.

In 2001, the old police divisions and sub-divisions were replaced with 29 district command units (DCUs), broadly coterminous with local council areas. In 2007, the DCUs were replaced by eight districts ('A' to 'H') in anticipation of local government restructuring under the Review of Public Administration. Responsibility for policing and justice was devolved to the Northern Ireland Assembly on 9 March 2010, although direction and control of the PSNI remains under the chief constable.

In addition to the PSNI, there are other agencies that have responsibility for specific parts of Northern Ireland's transport infrastructure:

- Belfast Harbour Police
- Belfast International Airport Constabulary

== Jurisdiction ==
PSNI officers have full powers of a constable throughout Northern Ireland and the adjacent United Kingdom waters. Other than in mutual aid circumstances, they have more limited powers of a constable in the other two legal jurisdictions of the United Kingdom—England and Wales, and Scotland. Police staff, although non-warranted members of the service, contribute to both back-office, operational support and front-line services, sometimes operating alongside warranted colleagues.

=== Co-operation with Garda Síochána ===
The Patten Report recommended that a programme of long-term personnel exchanges should be established between the PSNI and the Garda Síochána, the national police force of the Republic of Ireland. This recommendation was enacted in 2002 by an Inter-Governmental Agreement on Policing Cooperation, which set the basis for the exchange of officers between the two services. There are three levels of exchanges:

- Personnel exchanges, for all ranks, without policing powers and for a term up to one year
- Secondments: for ranks from sergeant to chief superintendent, with policing powers, for up to three years
- Lateral entry by the permanent transfer of officers for ranks above inspector and under assistant commissioner

The protocols for these movements of personnel were signed by both the chief constable of the PSNI and the Garda Commissioner on 21 February 2005.

== Accountability ==
The PSNI is supervised by the Northern Ireland Policing Board.

The Police Ombudsman for Northern Ireland deals with any complaints regarding the PSNI, and investigates any allegations of misconduct by police officers. Police staff do not fall under the ombudsman's jurisdiction. The current Police Ombudsman is Marie Anderson, who took over from Michael Maguire in July 2019.

The PSNI is also internally regulated by its Professional Standards Department, who can direct local "professional standards champions" (superintendents at district level) to investigate relatively minor matters, while a "misconduct panel" will consider more serious misconduct issues. Outcomes from misconduct hearings include dismissal, a requirement to resign, reduction in rank, monetary fines and cautions.

== Recruitment ==
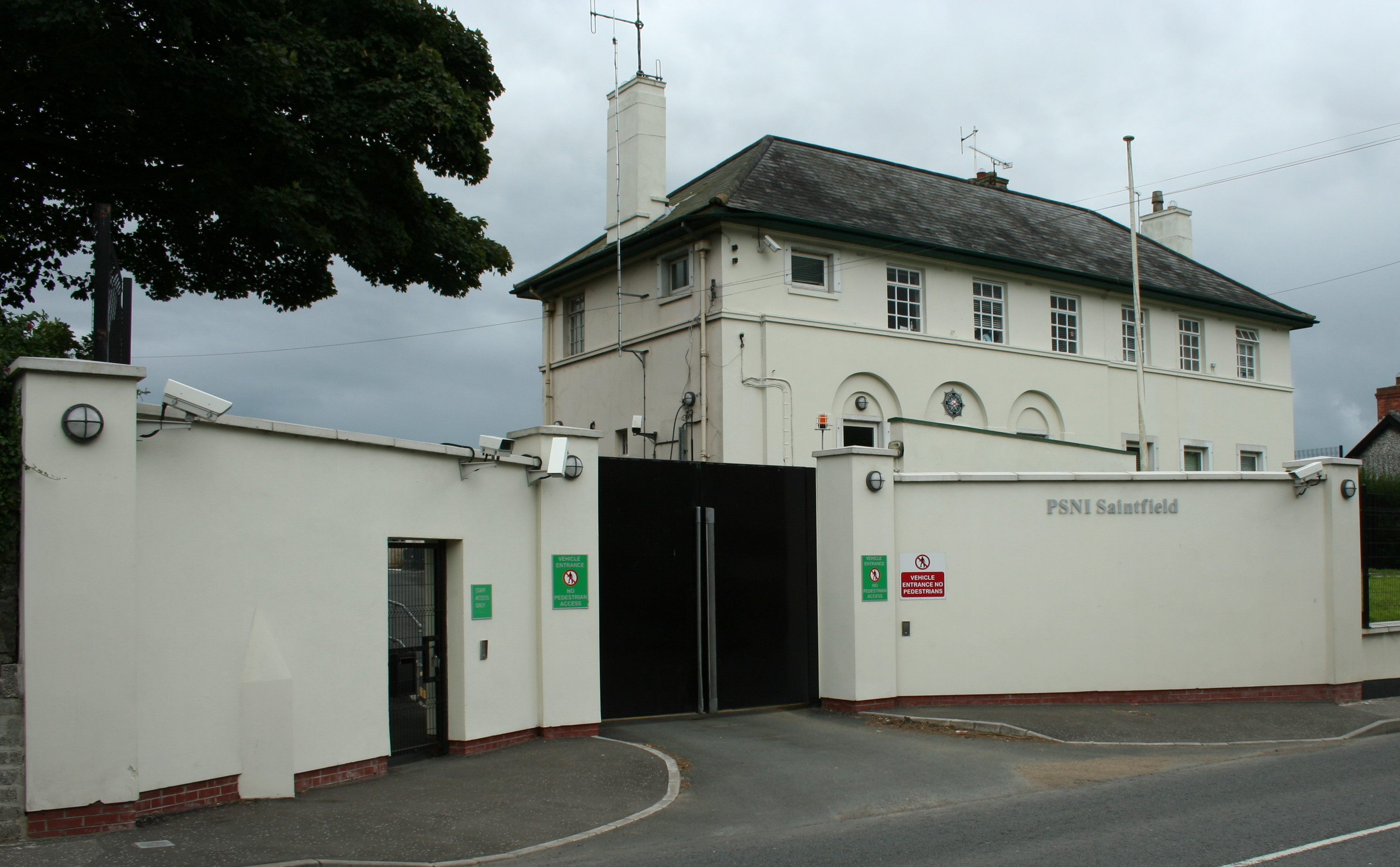
Saintfield police station

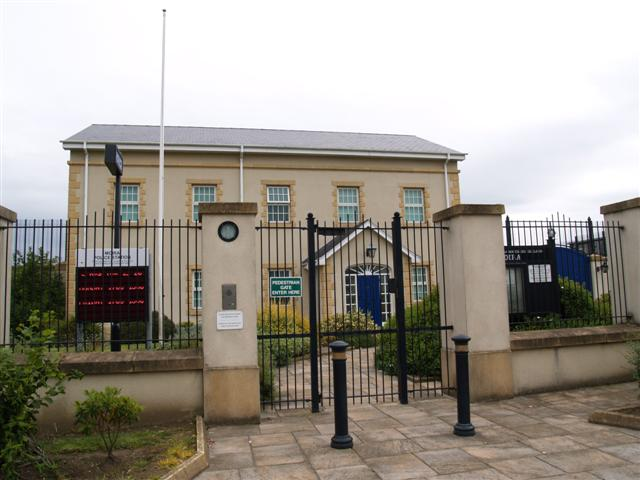
Moira police station

The PSNI was initially legally obliged to operate an affirmative action policy of recruiting 50% of its trainee officers from a Catholic background and 50% from a non-Catholic background, as recommended by the Patten Report, in order to address the underrepresentation of Catholics that had existed for many decades in policing; in 2001 the RUC was almost 92% Protestant. Many unionist politicians said the "50:50" policy was unfair, and when the Bill to set up the PSNI was going through Parliament, Minister of State Adam Ingram stated: "Dominic Grieve referred to positive discrimination and we hold our hands up. Clause 43 refers to discrimination and appointments and there is no point in saying that that is anything other than positive discrimination." However, the Northern Ireland Human Rights Commission cited international human rights law to show that special measures to secure minority participation were in accordance with human rights standards and did not in law constitute 'discrimination'.

By February 2011, 29.7% of the 7,200 officers were from a Catholic background, but among the 2,500 police staff (non-warranted members), where the 50:50 rule operated only for larger recruitment drives, the proportion of Catholics was just 18%. The British Government nevertheless proposed to end the 50:50 measure, and provisions for 'lateral entry' of Catholic officers from other police forces, with effect from the end of March 2011. Following a public consultation the special measures were ended in respect of police officers and police staff in April 2011.

Deloitte conducted recruitment exercises on behalf of the PSNI, and was the dominant firm in the Consensia Partnership, which existed from 2001 to 2009.

As of 2017, the PSNI has announced that it will be introducing new schemes to increase the number of Catholics in the force. The PSNI is focusing on tackling the fear factor of joining the service as violent dissident Republicans are discouraging Catholics from joining and continue to attack Catholic officers.

== Policies ==
In September 2006 it was confirmed that Assistant Chief Constable Judith Gillespie approved the PSNI policy of using children as informants including in exceptional circumstances to inform on their own families, but not their parents. The document added safeguards including having a parent or "appropriate adult" present at meetings between juveniles and their handler. It also stressed a child's welfare should be paramount when considering the controversial tactics and required that any risk had been properly explained to them and a risk assessment completed.

== Specialist units ==
=== Armed Response Unit ===
Specially-trained Armed Response Unit (ARU) officers support other parts of the PSNI when faced with people who are carrying weapons such as knives and firearms.

=== Headquarters Mobile Support Unit ===
Headquarters Mobile Support Unit (HMSU) is the tactical unit of the PSNI. HMSU officers are trained to Specialist Firearms Officer (SFO) and Counter Terrorist Specialist Firearms Officer (CTSFO) standards. They undergo a 26-week training programme including firearms, unarmed combat, roping, driving and photography.

=== Tactical Support Group ===
Tactical Support Group (TSG) officers provide a range of core and specialist services to district policing teams.

Core TSG functions include public order, counter-terrorism and crime reduction, community safety, crime scene response, and surveillance capability.

== Uniform ==
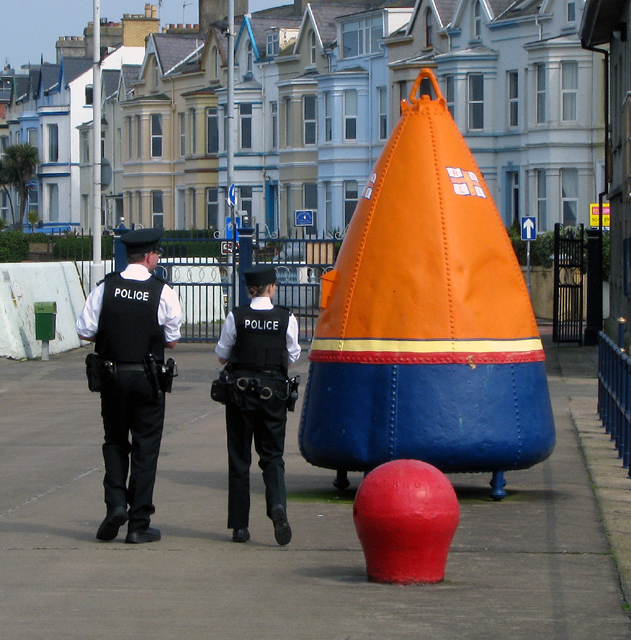
Male and female PSNI officers on a pier in Bangor, County Down

The colour of the PSNI uniform is bottle green. Pre-1970s RUC uniforms retained a dark green called rifle green, which was often mistaken as black. A lighter shade of green was introduced following the Hunt Report in the early 1970s, although Hunt recommended that British blue should be introduced. The Patten report, however, recommended the retention of the green uniform (Recommendation No. 154). The RUC officially described this as 'rifle green'. When the six new versions of the PSNI uniform were introduced, in March 2002, the term 'bottle green' was used for basically the same colour to convey a less militaristic theme. In 2018, a formal review was launched about the current uniform after officers gave feedback on it.

On 31 January 2022, a new uniform was introduced for frontline officers. This change replaced the white shirt and tie that had been worn since 2001 with a green wicking material T-shirt. This new style shirt is embroidered with the PSNI crest on the left breast and the word "POLICE" on the left collar and both sleeves. The new shirt also facilitates the wearing of epaulettes to display rank and numerals. This modern workwear is similar to that of Police Scotland aside from colour and to uniforms of some police services in England and Wales. Officer headwear has remained the same and traditionally consists of peaked caps for males and kepi style hats for females. Baseball style caps are worn by tactical units.

=== Badge and flag ===
"The design of the emblem for the police is the design illustrated in Schedule 1 to these Regulations." —Police Emblems and Flags Regulations (Northern Ireland) 2002, Section 3
The PSNI badge features the St. Patrick's saltire, and six symbols representing different and shared traditions: The Scales of Justice (representing equality and justice); A crown (a traditional symbol of royalty but not the St Edward's Crown worn by or representing the British Sovereign); The harp (a traditional Irish symbol but not the Brian Boru harp used as an official emblem in the Republic); A torch (representing enlightenment and a new beginning); An olive branch (a peace symbol from Ancient Greece); A shamrock (a traditional Irish symbol, used by St Patrick, patron saint of all Ireland, to explain the Christian Trinity)

"The design of the flag for the police is the design illustrated in Schedule 1 to these Regulations on a dark green background." —Police Emblems and Flags Regulations (Northern Ireland) 2002, Section 8

Under the Police Emblems and Flags Regulations (Northern Ireland) 2002 no other flag can be used by the PSNI and it is the only one permitted to be flown on any PSNI building, vehicle, aircraft or vessel.

"The emblem explores the notion of inclusiveness and parity through the simple stylistic representation of a variety of symbols that reflect diversity, hope and the desire to mutually respect and protect difference through policing.

"The sunburst surrounding the roundel represents a new beginning or a new dawn for the new Police Service. The shape is echoed in the central star that provides six areas between its rays for a series of symbols – all of equal prominence.

"[The] symbols include scales of justice, a harp, a torch, an olive branch. a shamrock and a crown. The centre piece houses the Cross of St. Patrick, which places all six symbols in the context of Northern Ireland.

"The simple rendering of these symbols in a neutral format of things that both unite and divide reflects upon an inclusive society where all our values, common interests and differences are recognised, celebrated and protected."

— Pauline McCabe, (quoted by Brendan McDaid in the Derry Journal, Friday 14 December 2001)

In November 2001, the British government published proposals for the emblem of the nascent PSNI – some featured the flax flower or St. Patrick's Saltire, while others lacked any discernible symbols at all. The proposals were roundly rejected by unionists, with the DUP's Ian Paisley Jr branding them "meaningless". UUP policing board member Lord Kilclooney criticised the government for "pre-empting" the decision of the board – he doubted agreement on a symbol could be reached.

An ad hoc committee of the Policing Board was established to carry out further research into a potential design, comprising six Policing Board members, including three of the Board's 'political members' (i.e. holders of elected political office at that time) and three of its 'independent members'. The committee comprised Pauline McCabe as Chair (McCabe was a business consultant who would later become Prisoner Ombudsman), the DUP's Sammy Wilson, the UUP's Fred Cobain, the SDLP's Eddie McGrady, former SDLP communications director Tom Kelly, and crossbench hereditary peer Viscount Brookeborough.

This committee reached agreement on the PSNI emblem the following month, which has been used ever since. Notably, the emblem contradicted the Patten recommendations, which called for neutral symbols to be used – instead, a crown, harp and shamrock were all incorporated, thus including symbols to satisfy each side of the community. The Secretary of State accordingly used the powers granted to them the previous year by new legislation, to adopt the new symbol.

The UUP, SDLP and DUP all commended the design they had agreed to – these parties had previously won two-thirds of all seats in the Assembly elections in 1998, and together made up 83% of unionists and 57% of nationalists.

However, reception was tepid among some unionist politicians. While DUP Foyle MLA and Policing Board member William Hay was enthusiastic about the badge, calling it "genuinely representative of both communities", then-councillor for the DUP, Gregory Campbell, said he was disappointed at the symbol but remarked that "it could have been a lot worse". In the UUP, future MLA Norah Beare condemned the badge as "an insult to the memory of the Royal Ulster Constabulary", while UUP councillor Ian Burns suggested there was "little on the new badge to symbolise the United Kingdom or Northern Ireland".

As Sinn Féin did not participate in the Policing Board, they had no input into this process of designing or selecting a logo. The unionist News Letter commented that "the absence of Sinn Fein undoubtedly made the task of reaching a consensus a lot easier for all concerned".

Also not participating were smaller parties – namely, Alliance (6 MLAs), the Northern Ireland Women's Coalition (2 MLAs), the Progressive Unionist Party (2 MLAs), as well as 3 independent unionist MLAs and Robert McCartney, the lone UK Unionist Party MLA (after the other 4 MLAs for the party broke off and became the Northern Ireland Unionist Party in 1999). Together, they represented 18 of the Assembly's 108 MLAs – one-sixth. But individually, none of them had enough Assembly seats to be eligible to sit on the Policing Board (the 10 'political' seats are filled based on each party's strength in the Assembly, via the d'Hondt method).

As well as refusing to support the PSNI for several years, Sinn Féin specifically criticised the symbol itself. Derry Sinn Féin councillor Paul Fleming called for the PSNI "to adopt a new badge and symbol which were entirely free from any association with either the British or Irish states". Fleming further described the inclusion of the crown and harp (both of which had been present previously in the RUC's badge) as "at odds with Patten", and criticised the SDLP for 'capitulating' in the face of "unionist pressure". Later, the SDLP's West Belfast MLA Alex Attwood hit back at the Sinn Féin criticisms, saying "There is no British crown. There is a crown, a common and shared symbol throughout these islands."

In the 2003 Assembly election, Sinn Féin displaced the SDLP as the majority party of nationalism. While Sinn Féin had no formal input into the design of the emblem, in 2007 its ard fheis voted to support the PSNI, and Sinn Féin has not proposed any change to the emblem – either at that time or since.

Alliance had called for an emblem in line with Patten recommendations, which did not contain specifically British or Irish symbols, but rather neutral symbols, and symbols specific to Northern Ireland, stating:

"Alliance has tried to focus the debate on [the substance] rather than [symbols] of policing... With respect to the emblem, Alliance would prefer something that reflects the community as a whole in Northern Ireland. We would caution against something that seeks to place British and Irish symbols side-by-side. Our preference reflects our vision of a united community rather than one in which Unionism and Nationalism remain separate communities."

On the emblem's adoption, one Alliance councillor, Frank McQuaid, expressed his like for the symbol, but that he desired "to get on with the job of policing the people" and that 'far too much time had been wasted' regarding the symbols.

== Equipment ==
=== Body armour ===
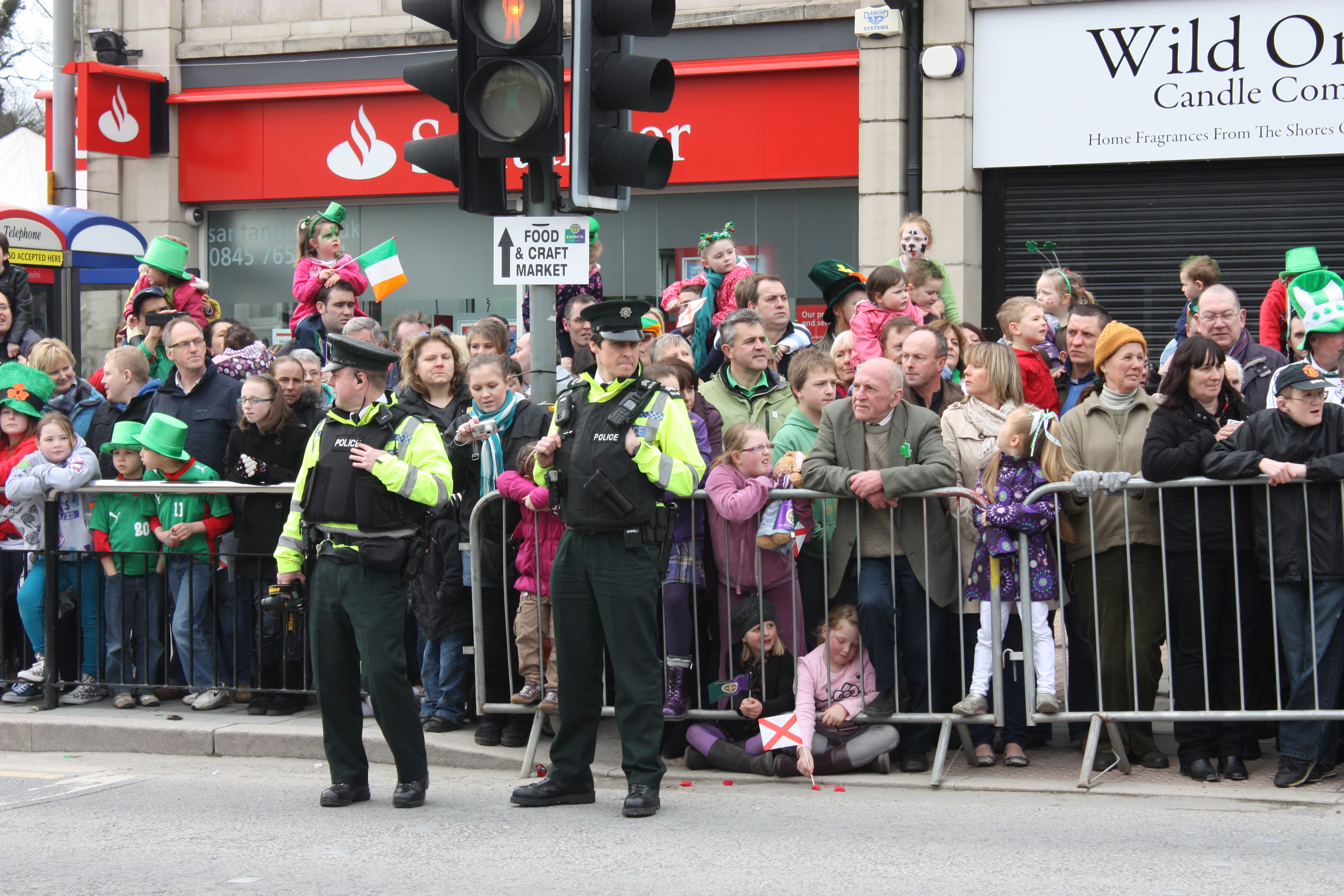
St Patrick's Day, Downpatrick, 2011. The constable on the left is wearing a bullet-resistant vest while the sergeant on the right is wearing a stab vest

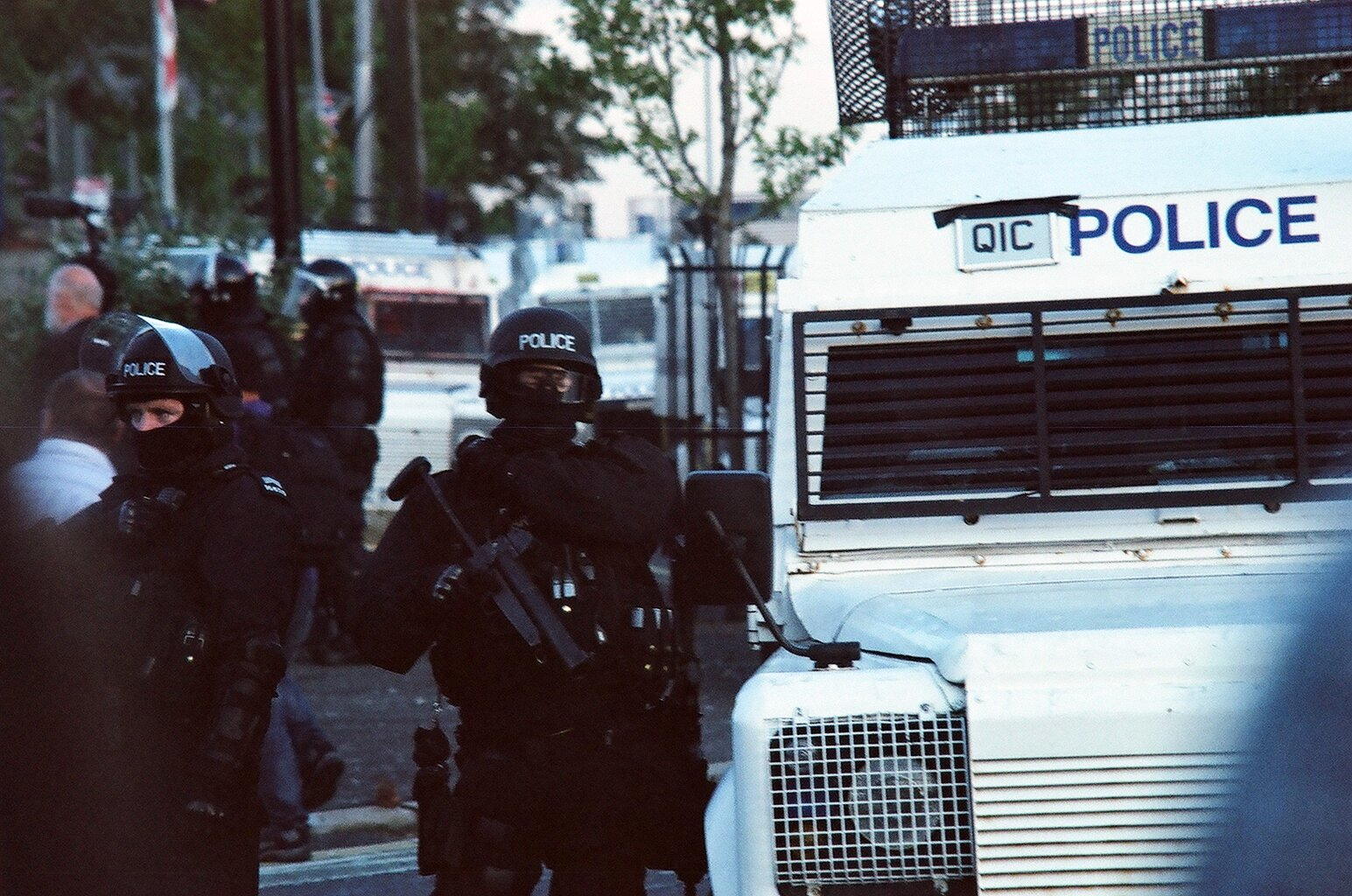
PSNI officers in riot gear armed with a Heckler & Koch grenade launcher for baton rounds during a riot in Belfast, 2011

PSNI officers wear overt body armour vests featuring RF1 standard ballistic plates, designed to stop high-velocity rifle rounds.

Beginning in December 2007 body armour was required for PSNI officers operating in the Greater Belfast and Greater Derry City areas owing to the threat from dissident republicans.

As of 2020, all officers are issued with ballistic body armour; however, in some lower-risk areas, officers are permitted, on an optional basis, to wear stab vests, such as those worn by most UK police officers and the Gardaí.

In 2019, the PSNI introduced a new integrated body armour system similar to the Osprey body armour used by the British Army, intended to be lighter and more comfortable to wear.

=== Firearms ===
Owing to the elevated threat posed by armed paramilitary groups, and in contrast to the majority of police services in the United Kingdom and the Republic of Ireland, all PSNI officers are routinely armed while on duty, with officers also permitted to carry firearms while off-duty.

The PSNI inherited RUC weapons upon its formation. The RUC were issued at the time with Ruger Speed-Six revolver and used a range of Heckler & Koch firearms.

The PSNI's standard issue firearm is the Glock 17 pistol, which is carried by every operational officer on the ground. The Glock 17 began superseding the Ruger Speed-Six revolvers from 2002 onwards, with only fifteen revolvers remaining in service by 2012.

The primary long-arm used in the service is the Heckler & Koch G36C carbine, which was procured to supplement and eventually replace the Heckler & Koch G3, Heckler & Koch HK33 and the Heckler & Koch MP5 submachine gun.

L104 riot guns are available for crowd control purposes.

Long arms are still routinely carried in areas of higher threat, such as Derry, Belfast (particularly north and west), and various border areas.

=== Vehicles ===
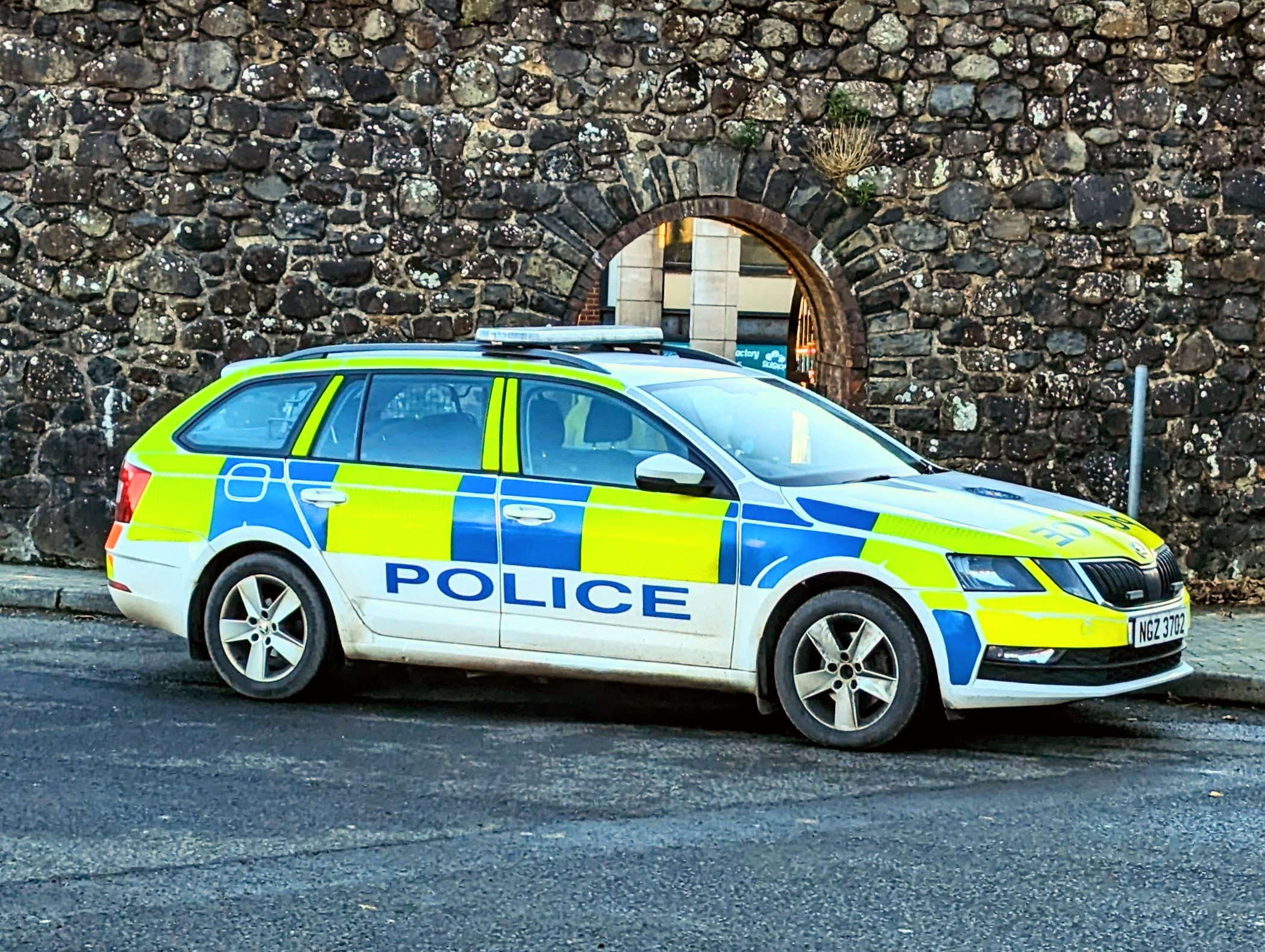
The Mk3.5 Škoda Octavia Estate constitutes a sizeable percentage of the service's liveried fleet. It is currently being replaced by newer models.

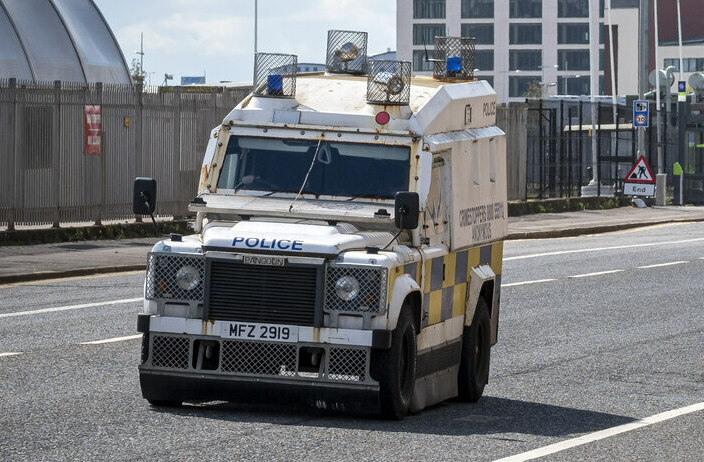
A PANGOLIN armoured Land Rover in Belfast.

The best known PSNI vehicle is the Land Rover Tangi armoured vehicle, used extensively during the volatile period of the Troubles. In 2011, however, it was announced that some of the ageing Tangi fleet were to be replaced in response to officer safety concerns following the 2010 Northern Ireland riots, and as of 2021, only four remained in frontline service. Replacements sourced by the PSNI from 2012 onwards included 176 OVIK PANGOLIN Armoured Public Order Vehicles and 124 Penman Public Order vehicles, both of which are based on the Land Rover Defender chassis.

The PSNI today uses mostly conventional vehicles as part of its fleet of up to 2,690 vehicles for regular patrols across Northern Ireland, most of which consist of marked and unmarked estate cars and SUVs. These can be categorised as either armoured or "soft skin" unarmoured vehicles, with the former receiving armoured panels and bullet-resistant windows. In November 2020, 50 Škoda Kodiaqs and five Škoda Superbs were supplied to the PSNI as part of a programme to modernise the force's fleet; vehicles either currently or previously operated by the PSNI include Škoda Octavias, Vauxhall Vectras, Volkswagen Passats, Ford Mondeos and Audi A6 and A4s, as well as BMW R1200RT motorcycles.

The PSNI has a fleet of 242 bicycles, which are used for city centres and walkway patrols.

=== Air support ===
In 2014, the Air Support Unit responded to over 4,000 callouts, including 12 Casualty evacuations and over 250 missing people searches. All aircraft are used for investigations, anti-crime operations, traffic management, search and rescue, public order situations, crime reduction initiatives and tackling terrorism.

==== Helicopters ====
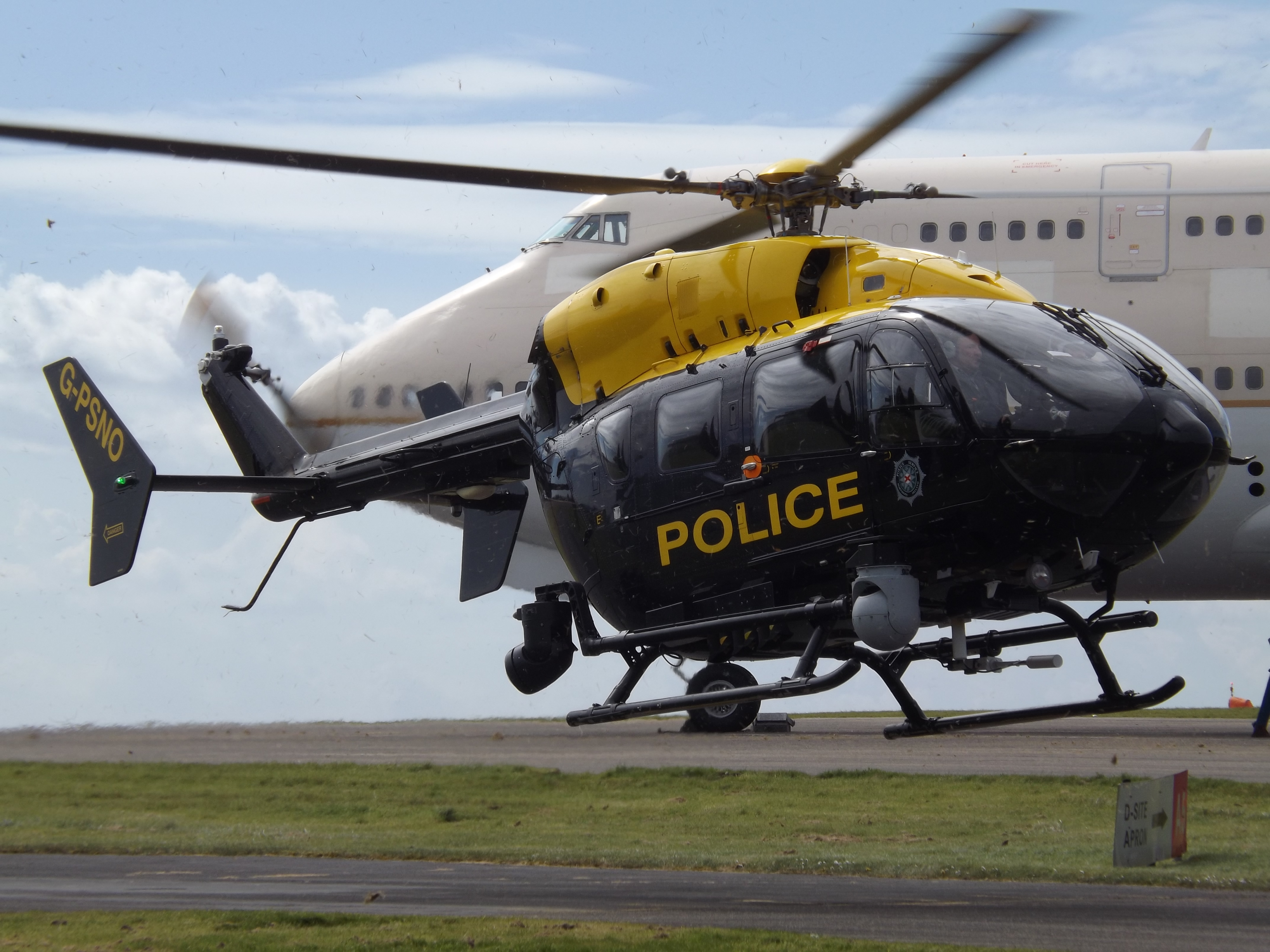
G-PSNO, one of the two Eurocopter EC 145 helicopters operated by the PSNI

In May 2005, the PSNI took delivery of its first helicopter, a Eurocopter EC 135, registration G-PSNI and callsign Police 44. In 2010, the PSNI took delivery of its second aircraft, a Eurocopter EC 145 registration G-PSNO and callsign Police 45 at a cost of £7 million. In July 2013, a third helicopter entered service, Eurocopter EC 145, registration G-PSNR and callsign Police 46.

==== Fixed wing aircraft ====
The PSNI operates two fixed wing aircraft for aerial surveillance. In August 1992, a Britten-Norman BN-2T Islander entered service with registration G-BSWR and callsign Scout 1. In July 2011, the aircraft sustained damage during a crash-landing at Belfast International Airport. In June 2013, prior to the G8 summit, a Britten-Norman Defender 4000 entered service with registration G-CGTC and callsign Scout 2.

== Headquarters ==
The service's headquarters are located in Knock, an area in east Belfast, and since the 1980s has included the Service's Museum.

== Chief constables ==
No.	Name	From	To	Notes
1	Sir Ronnie Flanagan	November 2001	March 2002	Incumbent chief constable (since 1996) of the service during its change from the Royal Ulster Constabulary to the PSNI in November 2001
–	Colin Cramphorn	March 2002	September 2002	Acting Chief constable
2	Sir Hugh Orde	September 2002	August 2009	
–	Judith Gillespie	August 2009	August 2009	Acting Chief constable
3	Sir Matt Baggott	August 2009	June 2014	
4	Sir George Hamilton	June 2014	June 2019	
5	Simon Byrne	June 2019	September 2023	Resigned following a number of controversies.
–	Mark Hamilton	September 2023	October 2023	Acting Chief constable
–	Jon Boutcher	October 2023	November 2023	Interim Chief constable
6	Jon Boutcher	November 2023	Incumbent	

== Ranks ==
Police Service of Northern Ireland ranks and insignia
Rank	Chief constable	Deputy chief constable	Assistant chief constable	Chief superintendent	Superintendent	Chief inspector	Inspector	Sergeant	Constable
Epaulette insignia						PSNI chief inspector			

In the PSNI, there are also part-time Special constables known as a Reserve Constable. In contrast to most Special constables elsewhere in the UK, this is a paid position.

The ranks and their insignia correspond to those of other UK police services, with a few modifications: sergeants' chevrons are worn point-up as is done in the United States, rather than point-down as is done in other police and military services of the United Kingdom. The six-pointed star and saltire device from the PSNI badge is used in place of the Crown in the insignia of superintendents, chief superintendents and the chief constable.

The rank insignia of the chief constable, unlike those in other parts of the UK, are similar to those of the Commissioner of Police of the Metropolis and the Commissioner of the City of London Police.

== Controversy ==
=== Contracting ===
In 2009, the Northern Ireland High Court set aside a proposed security services contract that the PSNI intended to award after conducting a procurement exercise using the "light tough regime", available under the then-current public procurement regulations. The PSNI had not operated a "standstill period" following its evaluation of tenders received, i.e. a period during which interested bidders could assess and if necessary challenge the authority's decision. The court held that this "high value contract with demonstrable cross-border interest" should have had a standstill period in place before contract award.

=== Officer misconduct ===
In 2021, the BBC reported on news of 39 internal investigations into sexual misconduct or domestic abuse by PSNI officers over the past five years.

In January 2023, nine PSNI officers were fired for sexual misconduct or domestic abuse.

In 2023, the Northern Ireland Public Prosecution Service (PPSNI) charged two PSNI officers for taking pictures of dead bodies. This was first reported on in 2022 by the BBC news programme Spotlight, after they spoke with family members of a man who committed suicide in 2017. The family of the man was concerned about the behaviour of officers on the scene.

This 2023 disciplinary decision came about as a result of an internal investigation titled "Operation Warwick", by the Police Ombudsman for Northern Ireland. For these charges, one officer was dismissed, and one was suspended.

=== 2023 data breaches ===
On 8 August 2023, the PSNI suffered a major data breach when personal information of approximately 9,500 police officers and staff was accidentally published online in response to a freedom of information request. The disclosed data included surnames, initials, ranks, work locations and departments for all PSNI employees.

Following the breaches, a LucidTalk opinion poll revealed that 38% of people in Northern Ireland had "no" or "mostly no" confidence in the PSNI. The poll also found that unionist voters were more likely to have confidence in the police service than nationalists, though support for the PSNI was highest amongst "other" voters.

On 26 September 2024, the UK Information Commissioner's Office (ICO) issued a monetary penalty notice fining the PSNI £750,000 for infringements of data protection law related to the breach. The ICO found that the PSNI had failed to implement appropriate technical and organisational measures to protect personal data from 25 May 2018 to 14 June 2024, in violation of the UK General Data Protection Regulation.

The ICO noted the sensitive nature of the data given the security situation in Northern Ireland, stating the breach "could lead to the most severe consequences imaginable for officers, staff and their families". While the ICO initially calculated a £5.6 million fine based on the seriousness of the infringements, this was reduced to £750,000 in line with the ICO's revised approach to public sector enforcement.

== Police Fund ==
The Northern Ireland Police Fund was set up in 2002 to provide care and financial assistance to police officers and ex-officers who have been injured or disabled from being the direct target of a terrorist attack and to the widows, widowers and families of police officers killed or injured through terrorism.

== See also ==
- List of law enforcement agencies in Northern Ireland
- Law enforcement in the United Kingdom
- List of Government departments and agencies in Northern Ireland
- Northern Ireland Security Guard Service
- PSNI F.C.
- PSNI GAA
