= Fletcher High School =

Fletcher High School may refer to:

- Duncan U. Fletcher High School, Neptune Beach, Florida, United States
- Fletcher High School, Gweru, Zimbabwe
