= 2nd Royal Tank Regiment =

Armoured Regiment of the British Army

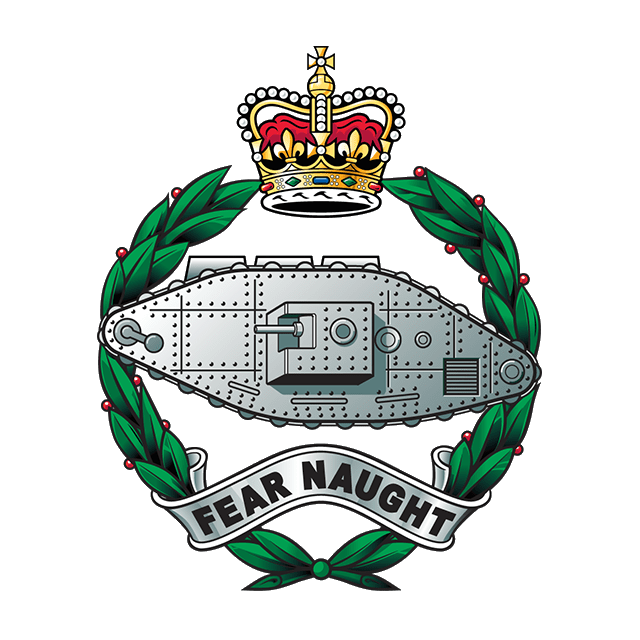
- Cap badge of the Royal Tank Regiment.
- Active: 28 July 1917– August 2014
- Country: United Kingdom
- Branch: British Army
- Type: Armoured
- Role: Armoured regiment
- Size: Regiment
- Part of: Royal Armoured Corps
- Garrison/HQ: Aliwal Barracks, Tidworth, Wiltshire
- Motto: Fear Naught
- Colors: Brown, red and green (Through mud and blood to the green fields beyond)
- March: Quick: My Boy Willie; Slow: The Royal Tank Regiment Slow March
- Anniversaries: Battle of Cambrai (20 November)
- Engagements: First World War; Second World War
- Battle honours: Battle Honours

Commanders
- Colonel-in-Chief: The Queen
- Notable commanders: Lt Gen Sir Hugh Elles; Maj Gen Douglas Pratt

Insignia
- Tactical Recognition Flash

The 2nd Royal Tank Regiment (2 RTR) was an armoured regiment of the British Army. It was part of the Royal Tank Regiment, itself part of the Royal Armoured Corps and the 1st Mechanized Brigade.

== History ==
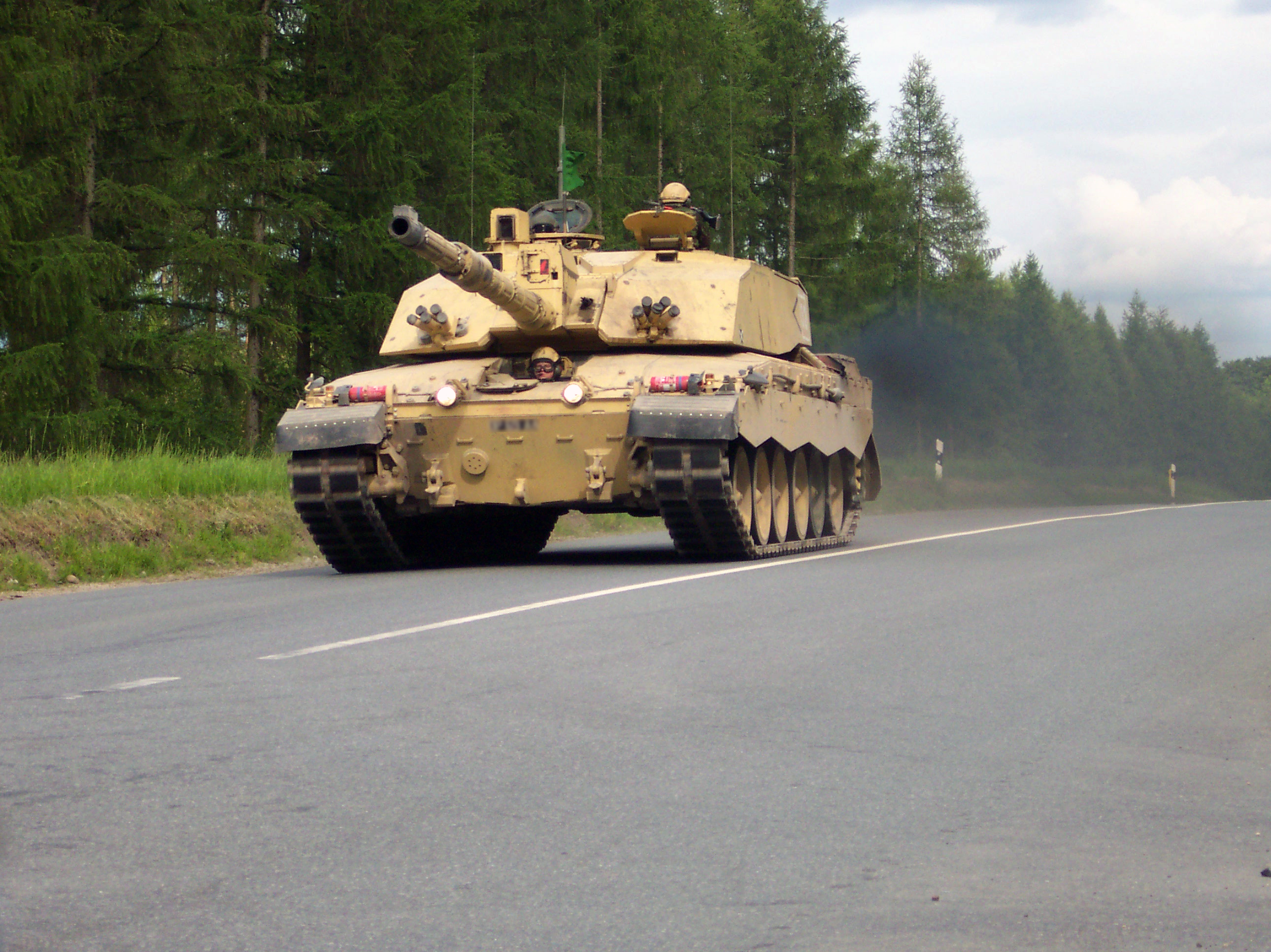
2 RTR Badger during live fire training exercises in 2004 on Bergen-Hohne Training Area (Germany) near the Fallingbostel station

Founded as B Battalion, Tank Corps in 1917, the 2 RTR first saw action in the First World War with the advent of tank technology. It later fought in the Second World War. In 1992, it merged with the 3rd Royal Tank Regiment, keeping their own original title. It became the second regiment to be equipped with the Challenger 2 in 1998.

Sabre squadrons were deployed by the regiment to Iraq on Operation Telic in 2003 and 2007. After a long period in Fallingbostel, Germany, the regiment moved back to Aliwal Barracks in Tidworth in July 2007. On 25 June 2008 at Buckingham Palace, both 1RTR and 2RTR were presented with their new Standard by The Queen, which included the new Battle Honour of Al Basrah 2003.

Units were deployed to Afghanistan on Operation Herrick in 2010.

In August 2014 the regiment merged with 1RTR to form the Royal Tank Regiment. The new regiment is based at Aliwal Barracks in Tidworth and is one of three armoured regiments equipped with the Challenger II tank.

=== 2003 friendly fire incident ===
In March 2003 Sergeant Steven Roberts of 2 RTR was shot and killed near Basra in an incident of friendly fire. Another soldier in 2 RTR had been attempting to protect Sergeant Roberts from a stone-wielding Iraqi protester that he was struggling with, who also died. An inquest heard that the soldier responsible was not aware that the machine gun used was inaccurate at short ranges. The inquest found that the shooting was an accident and that Roberts died because the Army failed to provide him with Enhanced Combat Body Armour.

== Organisation ==
The Armoured Regiment consisted of 5 Squadrons:

- Nero Squadron - Headquarters and Support
- Cyclops Squadron - Armoured Squadron
- Badger Squadron - Armoured Squadron
- Egypt Squadron - Armoured Squadron
- Falcon Squadron - Armoured Reconnaissance Squadron

== Commanding Officers ==
The Commanding Officers have been:

- 1958–1960: Lt.-Col. Patrick R.C. Hobart:
- 1960–1963: Lt.-Col. A.R.E. Davis
- 1963–1965: Lt.-Col. John G.R. Allen
- 1965–1967: Lt.-Col. Douglas W.A. Ambidge
- 1967–1970: Lt.-Col. Thomas S.M. Welch
- 1970–1973: Lt.-Col. Geoffrey L.D. Duckworth
- 1973–1975: Lt.-Col. Michael J. Evans
- 1975–1977: Lt.-Col. Keith R. Ecclestone
- 1977–1979: Lt.-Col. Peter D. Bentley
- 1979–1980: Lt.-Col. William S. Bale
- 1980–1982: Lt.-Col. David A. Williams
- 1982–1984: Lt.-Col. Robert W.M. McAfee
- 1984–1987: Lt.-Col. Christopher J.A. Hammerbeck
- 1987–1988: Lt.-Col. David W. Lloyd-Edwards
- 1988–1991: Lt.-Col. Andrew C.I. Gadsby
- 1991–1993: Lt.-Col. A. David Leakey
- 1993–1995: Lt.-Col. Stephen J.B. White
- 1995–1997: Lt.-Col. Nigel R.F. Aylwin-Foster
- 1997–2000: Lt.-Col. Simon Caraffi
- 2000–2002: Lt.-Col. Patrick J. Allison
- 2002–2004: Lt.-Col. Piers D.P. Hankinson
- 2004–2006: Lt.-Col. John R. Patterson
- 2006–2008: Lt.-Col. David A. Catmur
- 2008–2010: Lt.-Col. T. Marcus L. Simson
- 2010–2012: Lt.-Col. Marcus H. Evans
- 2012–2014: Lt.-Col. Jason M. Williams
