= Paddington Mhondoro =

Zimbabwean cricketer (1986–2015)

Personal information
- Born: 27 September 1986; Gweru, Zimbabwe
- Died: 13 March 2015 (aged 28); Midlands Province, Zimbabwe
- Batting: Right-handed
- Bowling: Right-arm medium

Domestic team information
- Years: Team
- 2013: Mid West Rhinos

Career statistics
Competition	LA
Matches	1
Runs scored	0
Batting average	0.00
100s/50s	0/0
Top score	0
Balls bowled	30
Wickets	2
Bowling average	19.00
5 wickets in innings	0
10 wickets in match	0
Best bowling	2/38
Catches/stumpings	1/–
- Source: CricketArchive, 19 March 2015

Paddington Mhondoro (27 September 1986 – 13 March 2015) was a Zimbabwean cricketer who played a single limited overs match for Mid West Rhinos during the 2013–14 season.

Born in Gweru, in Zimbabwe's Midlands Province, Mhondoro attended Chipembere Primary School in Highfield, a suburb of Harare, before moving to Chegutu with his parents. A right-handed all-rounder, he featured in the squad for the Zimbabwean national under-19 team in 2006, without playing any matches. The majority of Mhondoro's cricket was played for the local Chegutu team in Midlands club leagues. His sole appearance for the Mid West Rhinos, a Zimbabwe Cricket franchise based in Kwekwe, came in the Pro50 Championship in December 2013. In the match, played against the Southern Rocks at the Kwekwe Sports Club, Mhondoro took the wickets of Innocent Kaia and Prince Masvaure, finishing with 2/38 from five overs. He came in eighth in the Rhinos' batting order, but was dismissed for a three-ball duck as his team was bowled out for 55. He was one of five Rhinos batsmen dismissed for ducks, and the fourth of six batsmen to fall to Tafadzwa Kamungozi, who took 6/13.

Mhondoro was killed in a road accident in March 2015, aged 28, having been travelling to Kadoma from a Logan Cup game he had been watching in Kwekwe.
