= Nigel Aylwin-Foster =

British Brigadier

Brigadier Nigel Aylwin-Foster is a British ex-soldier, once commander of the 2nd Royal Tank Regiment.

He was deployed to Multi-National Force-Iraq (c2004-05) as the Deputy Commander of the Office of Security Transition. The Office of Security Cooperation, which existed for only three months, was replaced by the Office of Security Transition (OST). General Petraeus first took command of the Office of Security Transition; its deputy commander was Brigadier Nigel Aylwin-Foster of the British Army. The OST, whose lifespan was a mere month, was effectively only a name change for the Office of Security Cooperation. The OST was replaced by MNSTC-I.

While at the Royal College of Defence Studies Aylwin-Foster wrote an analysis of U.S. Army-led operations in Iraq, and the effectiveness of counter-insurgency there. This was later published in "Military Review."

His last British Army appointment was Director of the Technology Division at the Defence Academy of the United Kingdom, "responsible for technology education and project management training across all four Services."

== Publications ==
- Changing the Army for Counterinsurgency Operations. (2005) Military Review, November–December, pp. 2–15
