= Malcolm Grainger =

Zimbabwean cricketer (born 1975)

Personal information
- Full name: Malcolm Grainger
- Born: 11 August 1975 (age 51); Gwelo, Midlands Province, Rhodesia
- Batting: Right-handed
- Bowling: Right-arm fast-medium

Domestic team information
- Years: Team
- 1994/95: Matabeleland

Career statistics
Competition	First-class
Matches	1
Runs scored	25
Batting average	12.50
100s/50s	–/–
Top score	19
Balls bowled	147
Wickets	6
Bowling average	12.16
5 wickets in innings	1
10 wickets in match	–
Best bowling	5/35
Catches/stumpings	1/–
- Source: ESPNcricinfo, 20 October 2012

Malcolm Grainger (born August 11, 1975) is a former Zimbabwean cricketer. He was a right-handed batsman and a right-arm medium-fast bowler who played for Matabeleland. He was born in Gwelo (now Gweru).

Grainger made an appearance for Matabeleland Schools against Ireland in 1991.

Grainger's first and only first-class appearance came in the 1994/95 Logan Cup competition, against Mashonaland Under-24s. Batting in the tailend, he scored 19 runs in the first innings and six in the second.

Grainger took figures of 5-35 with the ball, but did not play another first-class match.
