= Thornhill High School =

Secondary school in Zimbabwe

Coordinates: 19.4325°S 29.8234°E

Information
- Established: 1955; 71 years ago

Thornhill High School opened on the air force base in Gwelo, Rhodesia (now Gweru, Zimbabwe) in January 1955. In January 1958, the school moved to its present site in Gweru.

The first Headmaster was Phil Todd who retired in 1961. He was followed by Geoff Lambert, Jon Eadie, John Drinkwater and Noel Gocha. The school has both boarders and day pupils. The boarding hostels are Cranwell House and Halton House. The school motto Per Spinas Ad Culmina (Through the thorns to the hilltop) was composed by Frank Taylor, based on the air force motto Per Ardua Ad Astra (Through effort to the stars).

The school has had a pass rate of over 70% every year. The school also offers sport, including hockey, cricket, soccer, volleyball, netball and rugby.
