= Patient Charumbira =

Zimbabwean cricketer (born 1987)

Personal information
- Born: 11 November 1987 (age 39); Gweru, Zimbabwe
- Bowling: Right-arm medium-fast
- Role: Bowling

Career statistics
Competition	FC	LA	T20
Matches	12	15	9
Runs scored	197	47	40
Batting average	11.58	5.87	20.00
100s/50s	0/0	0/0	0/0
Top score	38	18*	17*
Catches/stumpings	9/-	6/–	2/–
- Source: ESPNcricinfo, 22 February 2017

Patient Charumbira (born 11 November 1987) is a Zimbabwean cricketer. He made his first-class debut for Zimbabwe A on 17 June 2006.
