= Christopher Muzvuru =

Piper Christopher "Muz" Muzvuru was the first black piper in the Irish Guards.

Muzvuru was born in Gweru, Zimbabwe, and joined the Irish Guards in 2001. He was killed by sniper fire, along with fellow Irish Guardsman Ian Malone, while serving in Iraq in 2003.

He was given a military funeral at RAF Brize Norton in Oxfordshire after his body was flown out from Iraq. In his native Zimbabwe, however, he was called a "traitor" by the state-controlled media. He was therefore buried in Gweru in an unmarked grave to prevent desecration of his grave.
