= Luther Mutyambizi =

Zimbabwean cricketer (born 1980)

Personal information
- Born: 26 June 1980 (age 46); Gweru, Zimbabwe
- Source: ESPNcricinfo, 24 February 2017

Luther Mutyambizi (born 26 June 1980) is a Zimbabwean cricketer. He made his first-class debut in the 1999/00 season.
