= Ascot Stadium =

Stadium in Zimbabwe

Coordinates: 19°25′55.596″S 29°47′39.012″E

Ascot Stadium is a multi-purpose stadium in Gweru, Zimbabwe. It is currently used mostly for football matches and serves as the home stadium for Hardbody F.C and Chapungu United. The stadium has a capacity of 5,000 people.

In 2012, Hardbody were given free use of the stadium by the Gweru City Council to promote football development.
