= Gweru =

Gweru Gwelo
- City
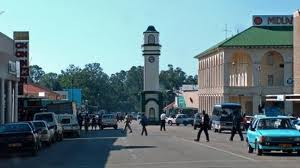

- Coat of arms
- Motto: Progress
- Gweru in Zimbabwe
- Coordinates: 19°27′12″S 29°48′55″E
- Country: Zimbabwe
- Province: Midlands
- Founded: 1894
- Incorporated (town): 1914
- Incorporated (city): 1971
- Elevation: 1,424 m (4,672 ft)

Population (2022 census)
  - Total: 158,200
- Time zone: UTC+2 (CAT)
- Climate: Cwb
- Website: https://gwerucitycouncilsite.wordpress.com/

Gweru, historically known as Gwelo, is the capital city of Zimbabwe's Midlands Province. Founded in 1894 as a military outpost by Leander Starr Jameson. the settlement grew from an area originally called "The Steep Place" by the Ndebele people, a reference to the high banks of the Gweru River. It achieved municipal status in 1914 and was declared a city in 1971.

As of the 2022 Zimbabwe census, Gweru has a population of 121,712 in the Rural district and 161,292 in the Urban district. The city serves as a regional hub for agriculture, particularly beef cattle ranching, crop farming and commercial gardening for export. In addition to its economic role, Gweru is an educational centre home to institutions such as Midlands State University, Mkoba Teachers College and Gweru Polytechnic. The city is nicknamed the City of Progress.

== History ==
Gweru used to be named Gwelo. Matabele settlement was named iKwelo ("The Steep Place"), after the river's high banks. The modern town, founded in 1894 as a military outpost, developed as an agricultural centre and became a municipality in 1914.

== Geography ==
The geographical coordinates for Gweru Urban are 19° 27' 0'' South and 29° 49' 0'' East. This places Gweru at the centre of Zimbabwe. The area coverage is almost 46 166 km^{2}. The city is built alongside Bulawayo-Harare railway, and the road near the railway spur to Mabuto.

=== Climate ===
Climate data for Gweru (1961–1990)
Month	Jan	Feb	Mar	Apr	May	Jun	Jul	Aug	Sep	Oct	Nov	Dec	Year
Mean daily maximum °C (°F)	26.3 (79.3)	25.8 (78.4)	25.8 (78.4)	24.7 (76.5)	22.9 (73.2)	20.6 (69.1)	20.5 (68.9)	23.3 (73.9)	26.8 (80.2)	28.3 (82.9)	27.4 (81.3)	26.3 (79.3)	24.9 (76.8)
Mean daily minimum °C (°F)	15.3 (59.5)	15.1 (59.2)	13.8 (56.8)	11.3 (52.3)	7.6 (45.7)	4.9 (40.8)	4.5 (40.1)	6.5 (43.7)	10.0 (50.0)	13.1 (55.6)	14.5 (58.1)	15.1 (59.2)	11.0 (51.8)
Average rainfall mm (inches)	139.1 (5.48)	124.8 (4.91)	55.9 (2.20)	29.0 (1.14)	7.7 (0.30)	1.9 (0.07)	1.0 (0.04)	1.9 (0.07)	9.3 (0.37)	35.1 (1.38)	96.2 (3.79)	159.4 (6.28)	661.3 (26.04)
Average rainy days	12	10	7	3	1	1	0	0	1	4	9	12	60
Source: World Meteorological Organization

== Nature and wildlife ==
In and around Gweru, there are attractive places, some man-made and some natural. There is:

- Antelope Park
- White Waters
- Insukamini Ruins

Historical population
Year	Pop.	±%
1936	2,165	—
1941	5,100	+135.6%
1946	7,237	+41.9%
1951	9,800	+35.4%
1960	27,290	+178.5%
1969	36,840	+35.0%
1974	51,000	+38.4%
1978	66,000	+29.4%
1982	78,918	+19.6%
1992	128,037	+62.2%
2002	141,260	+10.3%
2012	157,865	+11.8%

== Economy ==
Situated along the road and railway between Harare and Bulawayo and near the rail spur to Maputo, Mozambique, Gweru has become a busy trade centre with modest industrial development. Its products include ferrochromium, textiles, dairy foods, leather, and building materials. The surrounding area, with its rich deposits of gold, chrome, iron, asbestos, and limestone, supports a number of mines. The training section of Zimbabwe's air force is in Gweru at the Gweru-Thornhill Air Base.

The city is also known for vibrant farming activities in cattle ranching and farming, including commercial gardening of crops for the export market. The country's oldest shoe manufacturer, the Bata Shoe Company and the Military and Aviation Museums are also some key features for which Gweru is well known.

== Culture ==
The Boggie clock tower, located at the intersection of Main Street and Robert Mugabe Way, was built in 1928 in memory of Major William James Boggie. The clock tower is one of the city's most famous landmarks.

The Nalatale and Danamombe archaeological sites lie approximately 70 and 85 km to the southwest, known for their patterned stonework. The remains at these sites date back to as early as the Torwa state during the 17th century, the most substantial being a four hundred-year-old stone wall decorated with motifs known to the tradition of stone-building in Zimbabwe. The surrounding area has rich deposits of gold, chrome, iron, asbestos and platinum and supports several mines.

=== Tourism ===
The main hotel in the city is the Midlands Hotel, which was opened in 1927 by the Meikles brothers. This hotel was to be demolished, but after many protests by the population, it was saved. Another important hotel is the Chitukuko (formerly the Hotel Cecil), located in the downtown area of the city. Both hotels were owned by Patrick Kombayi, a former mayor. The Fairmile Motel is just one mile from the city center on the Bulawayo highway.

=== Sports and stadia ===
==== Soccer ====
- Chapungu Football Club

As of 2025, TelOne play in the Zimbabwe Premier League Soccer League (ZPSL) at the Bata Stadium.

Chapungu F.C previously played in the ZPSL. Its home was the Ascot Stadium.

== Education ==
Primary schools include the private Midlands Christian School.

Secondary schools include Lingfield Christian Academy and Midlands Christian College (both private), Chaplin High School , Thornhill High School and Fletcher High School.

Institutes of higher education include

- Gweru Polytechnic Institute
- Herentals College
- International Correspondence Schools
- Mkoba Teachers College
- Midlands State University
- Zimbabwe Open University

== Media ==
Gweru's local newspaper, The Gweru Times, once ceased publishing in 2015 but is now operational.

== Transportation ==
=== Railway ===
Railways arrived in Gwelo (Gweru) in 1902. National Railways of Zimbabwe have the country's largest marshalling yard, Dabuka, on the south side of Gweru. Dabuka plays a pivotal role in rail movement in the country as it is the central hub of the rail links to Mozambique in the east, South Africa in the south and Botswana and Namibia in the south west, lying on the Beira–Bulawayo railway.

Gwelo was once home to the Gwelo & District Light Railway, a 2 ft gauge steam for pleasure railway.

=== Roads ===
As a central city (hub), it has direct links to all the other cities and towns of Zimbabwe. It is 164 km from Bulawayo, 183 km from Masvingo, 471 km from Beitbridge, and 275 km from Harare.

Road names used are by destination only, for example, the Harare-Bulawayo Road. There are only main roads, no highways or freeways.

== Notable people ==
- Brendan Ashby, Olympic swimmer
- Patient Charumbira, cricketer
- Shimmer Chinodya, writer
- Edmore Chirambadare, footballer
- Gerald B. Clarke, Rhodesian politician
- Malcolm Grainger, cricketer
- Gregg Haakonsen, cricketer
- Mandy Loots, Olympic swimmer
- Orlando Lourenco, tennis player
- Paddington Mhondoro, cricketer
- Energy Murambadoro, footballer
- Kudakwashe Musharu, footballer
- Luther Mutyambizi, cricketer
- Christopher Muzvuru, Irish Guards piper
- Welshman Ncube, politician
- Rudolf Nyandoro, Roman Catholic bishop
- David Pocock, Australia international rugby union player and politician
- Ray Reed, racing driver
- Nkululeko Mkastos Sibanda, politician
- Alec Smith, Rhodesian Army chaplain, son of Ian Smith
- Thomas Sweswe, footballer
- Gary Teichmann, South Africa international rugby union player
- Maxwell Dube, Former Footballer of the Year, footballer
- Joseph Mudzingwa, Zimbabwe Sevens National Team, Rugby Player

== Sister cities ==
- Basildon, England, United Kingdom
- Manchester, United States
- Tsumeb, Namibia

== See also ==
- List of cities and towns in Zimbabwe
