= Energy Murambadoro =

Zimbabwean footballer (born 1982)

Personal information
- Full name: Energy Murambadoro
- Date of birth: 27 June 1982 (age 44)
- Place of birth: Gweru, Zimbabwe
- Position: Goalkeeper

Senior career*
Years	Team	Apps	(Gls)
2003	CAPS United		
2003–2004	Hellenic	10	(0)
2004–2005	Bnei Sakhnin	9	(0)
2005–2006	CAPS United		
2006	Benoni Premier United	2	(0)
2007	CAPS United	46	(0)
2008–2012	Bidvest Wits	5	(0)
2010	→ Mpumalanga Black Aces (loan)	10	(0)
2013–2015	Mpumalanga Black Aces	40	(0)
2015–2019	AmaZulu		

International career
2002–2008	Zimbabwe	27	(0)
- * Club domestic league appearances and goals

Energy Murambadoro (nickname "Gokwe": born 27 June 1982 in Gweru) is a former Zimbabwean association football goalkeeper. He has retired from international football with Zimbabwe. He has two children.

== Club career ==
On 24 November 2009 Mpumalanga Black Aces F.C. bolstered their goalkeeping department with the acquisition of Murambadoro. On 20 October 2012, he was one of sixteen players who were cleared of match fixing by the Zimbabwe Football Association.

The following are the clubs that Energy played including the years and transfers:

In 2003/2004 Energy left Caps United (Zimbabwe) and Joined Hellenics (South Africa)

In 2004/2005 Energy left Hellenics (South Africa) and Joined Bnei Sakhnin (Israel)

In 2005/2006 Energy left Joined Bnei Sakhnin (Israel) and Joined Caps United (Zimbabwe)

In 2006/2007 Energy left Caps United (Zimbabwe) and Joined Hellenics (South Africa)

In 2007/2008 Energy left Hellenics (South Africa) and Joined Caps United (Zimbabwe)

In 2008/2009 Energy left Caps United (Zimbabwe) and Joined Bidvest Wits FC (South Africa)

In 2009/2010 Energy left Bidvest Wits FC (South Africa) and Joined Black Ace (South Africa)

In 2009/2010 Energy left Black Ace (South Africa) and Joined Bidvest Wits FC (South Africa)

In 2012/2013 Energy left Bidvest Wits FC (South Africa) and from there he had no club.

In 2014/2015 Energy joined Black Ace (South Africa)
In 2014/2015 Energy left Black Ace (South Africa) and AmaZulu FC (South Africa)

In 2014/2015 Energy left AmaZulu FC (South Africa) and Black Ace (South Africa)

In 2015/2016 Energy left Black Ace (South Africa) and AmaZulu FC (South Africa)

== International career ==
He was a member of the Zimbabwean 2004 African Nations Cup team, who finished bottom of their group in the first round of competition, thus failing to secure qualification for the quarter-finals. He also participated at the 2006 African Nations Cup, with the same outcome. Famous Zimbabwe coach Sir Derek Nicholls regarded Energy as the best goalkeeper the nation has ever seen and nicknamed him Pat in goal.
