= Consensia partnership =

The Consensia Partnership is a former trading name for a consortium led by Deloitte, used from 2001 to 2009 in relation to a contract to carry out recruitment of police officers for the Police Service of Northern Ireland (PSNI). That work is now conducted by Deloitte MCS Limited under its own branding.

The PSNI was set up in line with the recommendations of the Patten Commission and the Police (Northern Ireland) Act 2000. The aim was to create a new beginning to policing Northern Ireland, with far-reaching and permanent change in policing structures and arrangements, so that the Police Service, in which the Catholic/Nationalist minority was very under-represented, became more reflective of the composition of the community. Consensia began recruiting for Regular trainees in February 2001 and the first Regular trainees completed their initial training in April 2002.

The process to form a pool of qualified candidates was, and in 2011 still is, conducted so that no-one receives less favourable treatment on grounds of gender, marital status, religion, political opinion, race, age (within upper and lower limits), sexual orientation or having or not having dependents or disability. Once a pool of qualified candidates has been formed, the Chief Constable appoint trainees on the basis of 50 per cent Roman Catholic and 50 per cent non-Roman Catholic. This "50:50" arrangement required special domestic legislation, and a temporary exception written into European Union equality legislation, in order to exempt it from the scope of non-discrimination law which, in Northern Ireland, ordinarily prohibits any differential treatment on religious grounds in the field of employment.

Following a series of recruitment rounds conducted by Consensia, and subsequently by Deloitte under its own name, composition of the Police Service had by February 2011 reached a Catholic representation of almost 30%, a substantial increase from 8% reported by the Independent Commission in 1999. The UK Government consequently proposed to discontinue, from April 2011, the "50:50" measures. Catholic participation in police support staff (recruitment for which was managed under different procedures by another company, Grafton Recruitment) remained around 18%, far below the 45.4% Catholic share of Northern Ireland's monitored workforce (firms of more than 10 employees).

The Consensia partnership comprised:

Management consultants Deloitte & Touche (now called Deloitte), Occupational Psychologists Pearn Kandola, AV Browne advertising and a fourth member was a medical services business that remained anonymous.
