= Dimbangombe College of Wildlife, Agriculture and Conservation Management =

Dimbangombe College of Wildlife, Agriculture and Conservation Management is an accredited college by Zimbabwe’s Ministry of Education located just outside Victoria Falls in Zimbabwe. It is situated on a 19,500-acre (79 km^{2}) property. Which is mainly used for research and training. It was established by Allan Savory's Africa Centre for Holistic Management (ACHM) in 1998 and is based at Dimbangombe ranch, near Victoria Falls which is the headquarters of ACHM.

The Current College principal is Sunny Moyo.

The College:

Trains people from the Hwange community, and from elsewhere in the region, as licensed professional guides and hunters, and other tourism- and safari-related vocations where a background in holistic management enhances employment opportunities.

Trains people from Non governmental Organizations (NGO’s) throughout the region in the development of holistically managed community-based conservation programs;

Trains current or aspiring professionals in wildlife management that integrates the needs and aspirations of the human communities that share their resource base with wildlife.

Carries out a research program on community-based ecosystem monitoring, designed and led by faculty and graduate students of Tufts University, was initiated in 2002.
