= Gweru Polytechnic Institute =

Technical college in Midlands Province, Zimbabwe

Coordinates: 19.4352°S 29.8216°E

Gweru Polytechnic College is a technical college located in the Midlands Province, Zimbabwe, providing over 60 courses in five divisions. The college is located 1.5 km north of Gweru city centre. Its focus is technical education and training for industry and commerce in Zimbabwe.

Gweru Polytechnic offers teaching to more than 2000 students. Its five divisions deliver certificates and diplomas. The divisions are Commerce, Engineering, NASS, Education, and Applied Sciences.

Since 1999, Gweru Polytechnic and Humber Business School have worked together to promote the development of small business in the Midlands province of Zimbabwe. Humber business faculty have visited Zimbabwe to conduct seminars and workshops on needs assessment and curriculum development, and Humber postgraduate business students have completed 8-week summer field placements in Zimbabwe. Gweru Polytechnic is the only college that offers Diploma in Technical and Vocational Education in Zimbabwe hence it is the only college training Lecturers in the country.
