= Mutare Polytechnic =

Technical vocational institution in Zimbabwe

- Motto: A student friendly environment
- Type: Government
- Established: 1 November 1984
- Academic affiliations: Ministry of Higher and Tertiary Education
- Chairman: Poniso Watema
- Students: approx 200
- Location: Box 640 Mutare, Josiah Tongogara/Vincent Ave, Mutare, Zimbabwe
- Language: English
- Colors: Green and yellow
- Website: www.mutarepolytechnic.ac.zw

Mutare Polytechnic (also known as Mutare Poly) is a parastatal technical vocational education and training institution under the Ministry of Higher and Tertiary Education of the government of Zimbabwe. It is located in Mutare, Manicaland Province.

== History ==
The institution was established in 1984 and was known as Umtali Technical College when it was formed. At its inception, the college operated as a satellite affiliate for Harare Polytechnic formerly Salisbury Technical College operating with just two divisions of Commerce and Engineering, right now the institution has six divisions with student enrolment of about 200 a year.

== Divisions ==
- Applied Arts and Science Division
- Civil and Construction Engineering Division
- Commerce Division
- Engineering Division
- Information Management Studies Division
- Research, Education and Enterprise Development

Mutare Polytechnic has had three principals since its establishment, Auther Mandimika (1984 to 1988), Tobias Kuwengwa (1989 to 2014) and currently Poniso Watema.

In 2014, the institution won the best training institution of the year award 2014 in the Tourism and Hospitality sector at the Megafest Tourism Awards. In 2018 the college was recognised in Gold category of the Arch of Europe Award for Quality and Technology.
