= Mkoba Teachers College =

Coordinates: 19.46006°S 29.76653°E

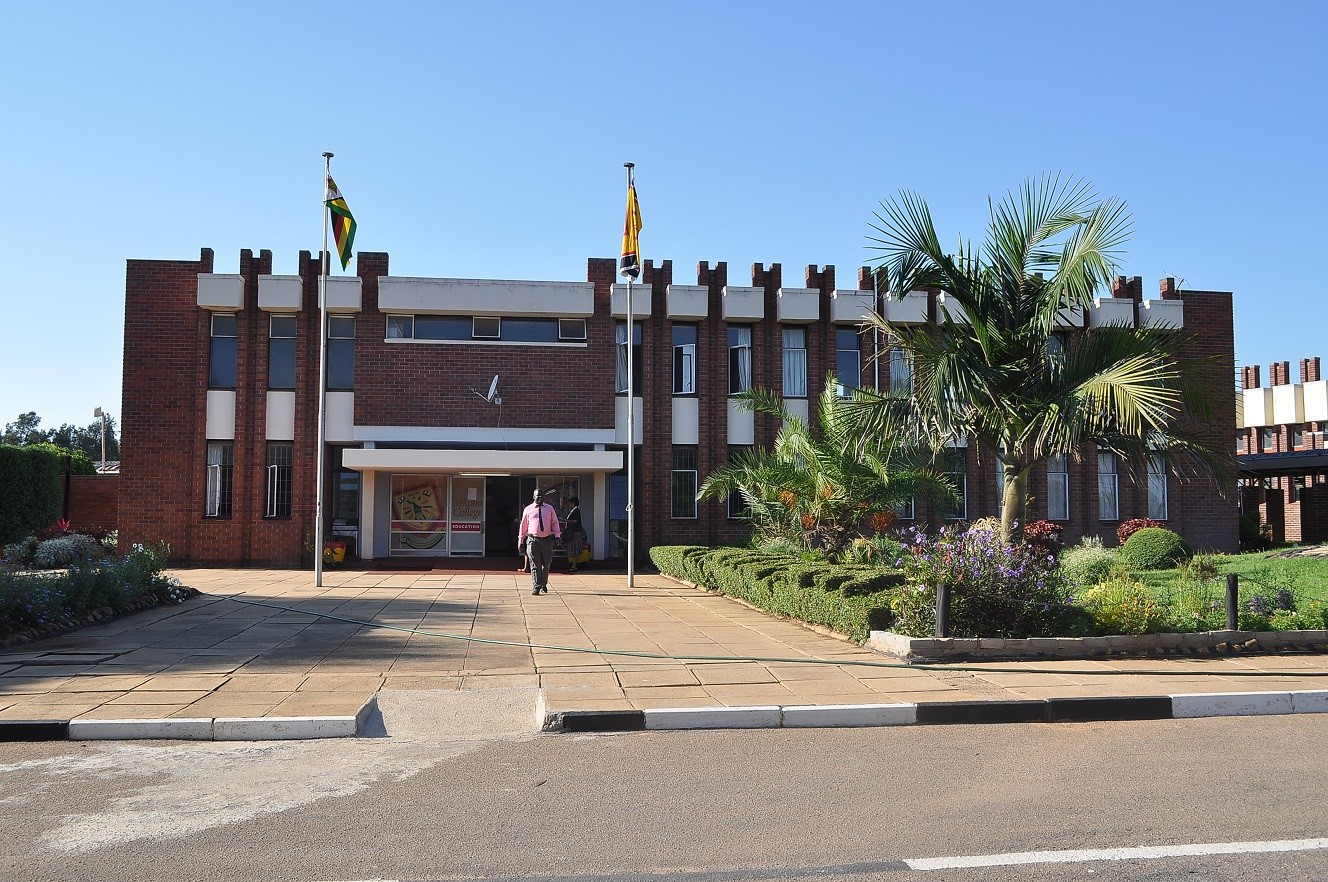
- Mkoba Teachers College (Administration Block)
- Motto: Education to the People
- Type: Normal school
- Established: 1978; 47 years ago
- Location: Gweru, Midlands Province, Zimbabwe
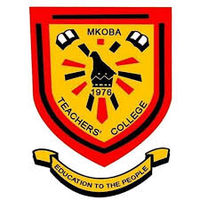

Mkoba Teachers College is a Zimbabwean teachers' college located in Gweru, Midlands Province.

Mkoba Teachers College is one of the oldest teacher's colleges in Zimbabwe. It was officially opened on 10 June 1978. The college offers teacher training services to the academic community in Zimbabwe. Mkoba Teachers College is one of thirteen Primary and Secondary school Teachers Colleges in Zimbabwe offering a University of Zimbabwe Diploma in Education programme comprising Theory of Education, Academic Studies, and Professional Studies.

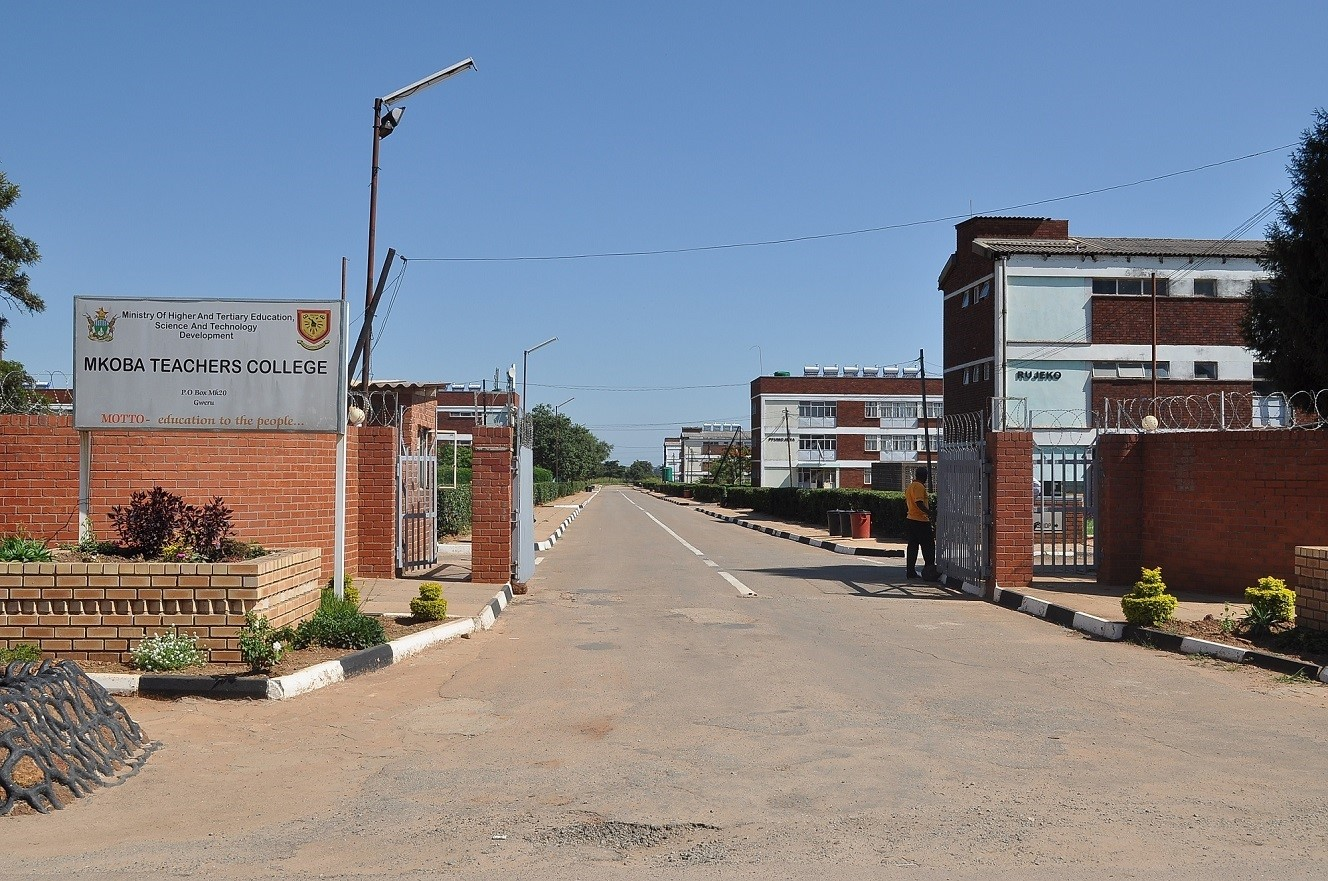
Mkoba Teachers College (Entrance Gate)

== See also ==
- Education in Zimbabwe
- List of schools in Zimbabwe
- List of universities in Zimbabwe

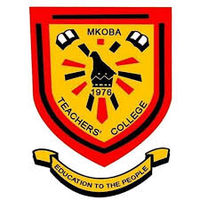
Mkoba Teachers College Logo
