= Fletcher High School, Gweru =

Coordinates: 19°30′55″S 29°51′14″E

Fletcher High School

Location
- Gweru; Zimbabwe

Information
- Established: 1957; 68 years ago
- Head teacher: Elijah Mazula
- Forms: 1-6
- Gender: Boys (1957-1982); Mixed (1982-present)

Fletcher High School is a school in Gweru, Zimbabwe. It was one of the first boarding schools during the colonial era prior to the Zimbabwe revolution. It was opened in 1957.

The first principal was D Davies. It was established as a boys' school but is currently co-ed, having admitted the first group of female students in 1982.

== Academic education ==
The school offers secondary education starting form 1 to form 6. Students in form 4 and form 6 write the local national examinations in line with the Zimbabwean secondary school education system.

Currently the school is under the headmaster Elijah Mazula.
