= Nkululeko Mkastos Sibanda =

Zimbabwean politician (born 1979)

President of ZINASU
- In office 9 December 2000 – 23 March 2003
- Vice President: Itayi Zimunya
- Preceded by: Hopewell Msavaya Gumbo
- Succeeded by: Philani Zamchiya

Personal details
- Born: 21 January 1979 (age 47) Gwelo, Rhodesia

Nkululeko Mkastos Sibanda (born 21 January 1979 in Gwelo) is a Zimbabwean politician.

== Politics ==
=== Students' Union and Human Rights Activism ===
Sibanda began challenging authority in high school. In college, he was elected a member of the Student Representative Council, eventually becoming president of the National Union of Students in Polytechnic and Technical Colleges (NUSPOTECH). In December 2000, he was elected President of the Zimbabwe National Students Union (ZINASU). He continuously challenged the government on the privatisation of education and the lack of basic human rights in the country. He championed the calls for democratic change in the country.

He was the Steering Committee Youth Representative of the Crisis in Zimbabwe Coalition, Board Member of the Zimbabwe Election Support Network, youth committee member of the National Constitutional Assembly amongst other political roles in the country. In 2001, he travelled to South America to attend the Peoples Global Action summit where he met autonomous groups such as the Zapastistas of Mexico amongst others, including Brazil's Landless People's Movement.

Sibanda's achievements include becoming the President of the Zimbabwe National Students Union (ZINASU) becoming the only person to lead ZINASU without being a University student. During his term of office ZINASU won the International Student Peace Prize in Norway.

=== Movement for Democratic Change (MDC) ===
After leaving ZINASU he spent 1 year and 9 months with the Movement for Democratic Change working in the Office of the President carrying out various responsibilities including Co-ordinating the Broad Alliance and engaging regional ambassadors on the issues of Zimbabwe. Sibanda then left the country in 2004 and returned to active Zimbabwe politics in 2018, when he was appointed the President Spokesperson by MDC President Nelson Chamisa

Nkululeko Sibanda is the current Spokesperson for Nelson Chamisa, who is the President of Zimbabwe's Movement for Democratic Change and is thought to have won the July 2018 Presidential elections in the country, before the military stepped in and forced the announcement of Emmerson Mnangagwa as the winner, including the subsequent confirmation by a partisan Supreme Court, sitting as a Constitutional Court.

== TV personality ==
Sibanda is also a TV personality who co-founded and co-presents with Baillor Jalloh. It's a weekly TV Show on Sheffield Live in Sheffield in the United Kingdom. The TV programme covers issues relating to Africans in the diaspora, bringing high level discussions and analysis of top news items on Africa and African in Sheffield and elsewhere in the world and beyond.

== Education ==
- Doctoral Degree in International Relations and Politics - (PhD) University of Huddersfield.
- Master of Arts Degree in Education (Outstanding) - (MEd) University of Huddersfield.
- Post Graduate Diploma in Education (Outstanding) - (PGDE) University of Huddersfield.
- Master of Arts Degree in Social Change, University of Leeds
- Bachelor of Arts Degree (Hons) in Social Policy, Sheffield Hallam University.
- Bachelor of Arts Degree (Hons) in Human and Social Studies with speciality in Public Policy, University of South Africa.
- Higher National Diploma in Accountancy, Bulawayo Polytechnic (was expelled from college on the orders of the Minister of Higher Education thus transferred to study with the University of South Africa)
