= Steven Roberts (British Army soldier) =

Royal Tank Regiment soldier

Sergeant Steven Mark Roberts (1969–2003) was the first British soldier to die in the 2003 invasion of Iraq on 24 March 2003. He was accidentally shot by a colleague using a tank-mounted machine gun while he was struggling with an Iraqi protester at a check point in Az Zubayr, near Basra. The Iraqi protester was also killed in that same incident. The gunner who shot Roberts had not been properly trained that the gun was inaccurate at short range. Sgt Roberts had been ordered to give up his body armour 3 days before he was fatally shot. The inquest held almost 4 years later into his death concluded he would have survived had he been wearing enhanced combat body armour.

After a lengthy campaign by Sgt Roberts family, in July 2006, the MOD changed their policy on Enhanced Combat Body Armour. Now no British soldier will go to a theatre of war without the option of wearing Enhanced Combat Body Armour.

Sgt Roberts had been serving with the 2nd Royal Tank Regiment, Cyclops Squadron.
