= Osprey body armour =

Body armour used by the British Armed Forces

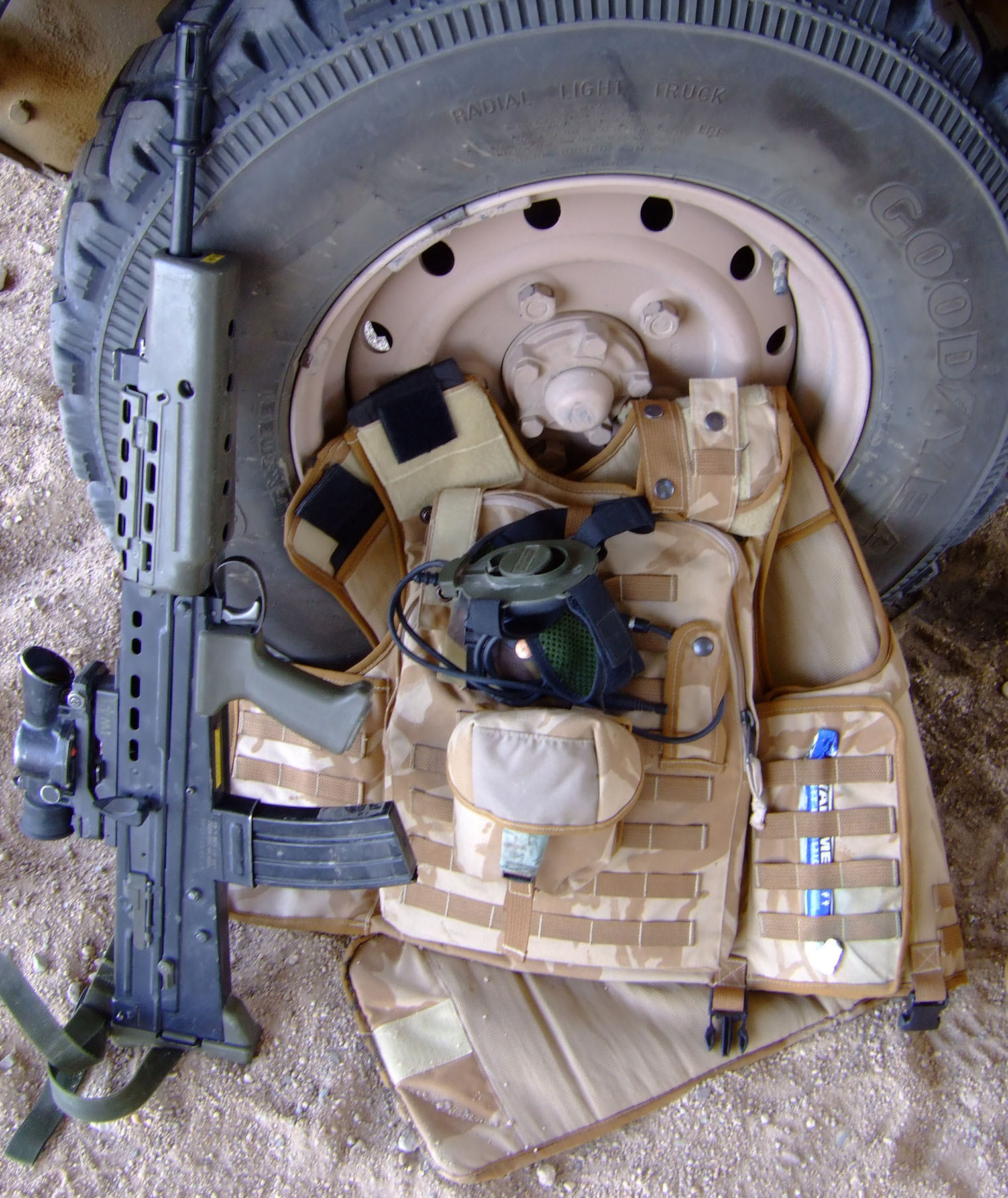
- Osprey Mk 2 body armour next to an L85A2 rifle.
- Type: Body armor
- Place of origin: United Kingdom

Production history
- Manufacturer: CQC Limited.
- Variants: See Variants

Osprey body armour is a system of body armour used by the British Armed Forces. The system is in its fourth iteration following extensive development and engagement with front line users.

== History ==
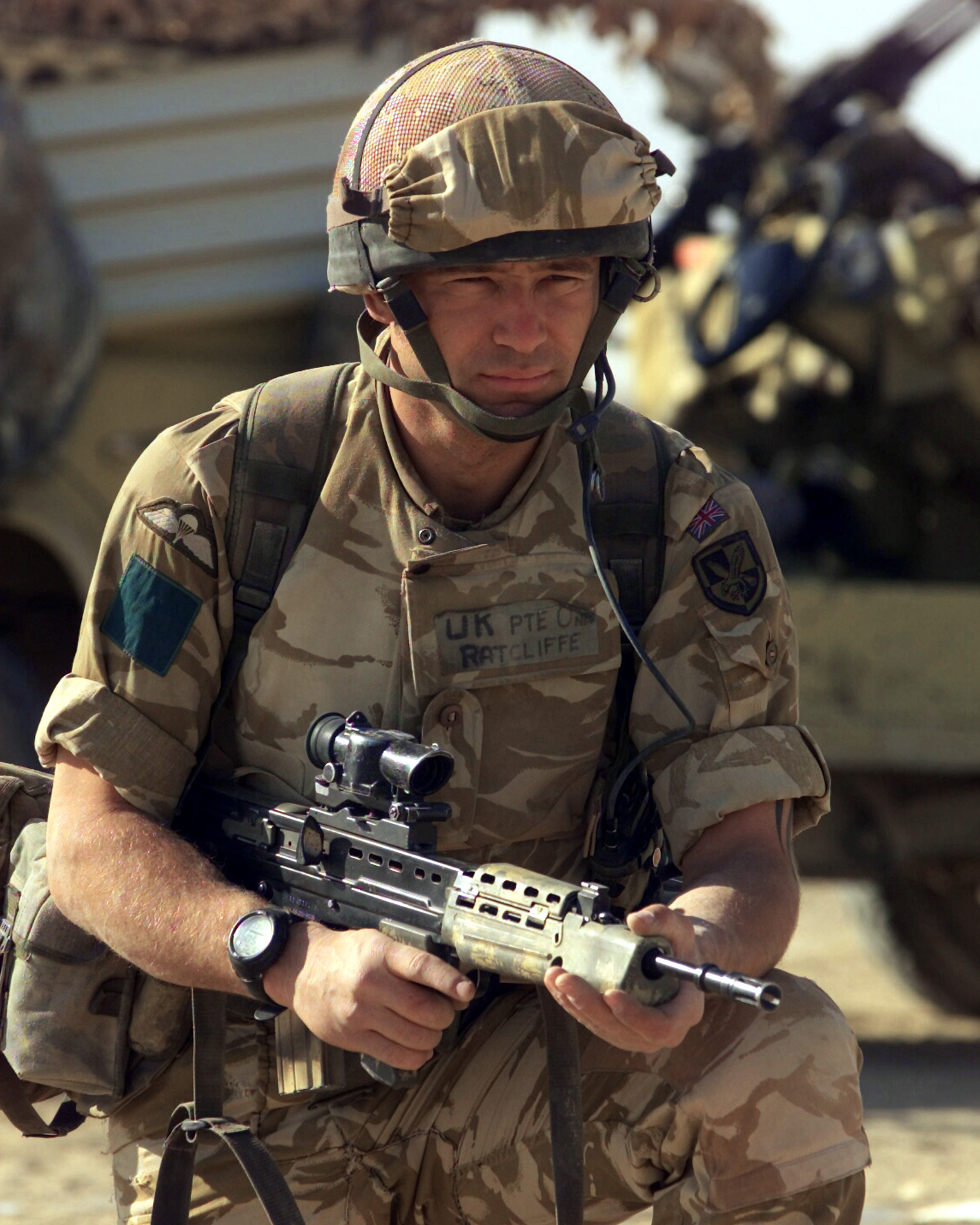
A soldier from 3rd Battalion, The Parachute Regiment, wearing Enhanced Combat Body Armour during Operation Telic

British forces first began using body armour on a widespread basis when combatting terrorist activities in Northern Ireland during Operation Banner, with this initially consisting of M52 and M69 flak vests and then the Individual Northern Ireland Body Armour vest which could be worn under the combat jacket. A vest known as Combat Body Armour was introduced for general issue outside of Northern Ireland in the 1980s, but consisted purely of soft body armour since the focus was on preventing injury from fragments generated by explosive blasts.

A later version known as Enhanced Combat Body Armour (ECBA) was developed in 1991 and allowed for the soft body armour to be augmented with ceramic hard armour plates for improved ballistic protection, but the small size of these plates meant that only the upper torso was protected.

Following lessons identified in Iraq by both British and US forces, including the death of Sergeant Steven Roberts, the Osprey armour system was released in 2006 for general use. It has subsequently been subject to modification, with a fourth version being issued to personnel serving in Afghanistan on Operation Herrick in 2010.

=== Replacement ===
In response to lessons learned in combat, the British Army developed the Virtus personal armour system that offers the same protection as Osprey, but is significantly lighter, moves with the body more easily, and produces a slimmer profile. Virtus is 4.7 kg (10 lb 6 oz) lighter, and will be even lighter once new armour plates in development are introduced. The level of protection can be increased or decreased depending on the threat environment by adding or removing soft armour pads and hard ballistic plates.

Unlike the Osprey's Velcro straps, the Virtus has a chest-positioned pin quick-release mechanism that releases the entire body kit when pulled for safe extraction in hazardous situations. A new, lighter helmet provides increased blunt impact protection, face and mandible guards for certain roles, and a shape designed to work with the armour and daysack so weapons can be comfortably used even in a prone position; it has a permanent universal mount for night vision gear and a scalable counterweight attached to the rear to ease strain on the wearer's neck.

The system also eases strain on loads the soldier would be carrying, incorporating the dynamic weight distribution (DWD) integral spine system, which is linked to the waist belt and helps spread the load of the body armour or daysac across the back, shoulders, and hips, which can be adjusted through a hand controller to their preference.

Virtus was officially issued in May 2016.

== Design ==
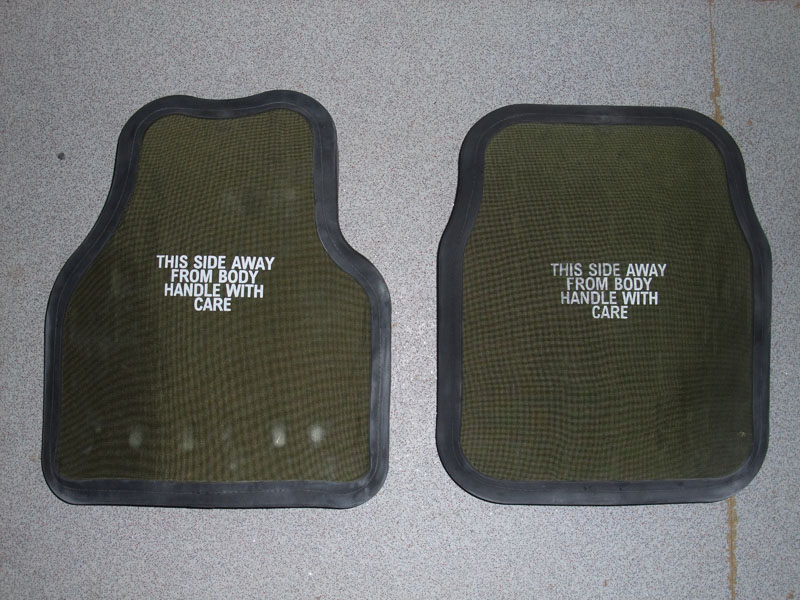
Front and rear hard armour plates as used with Osprey vests

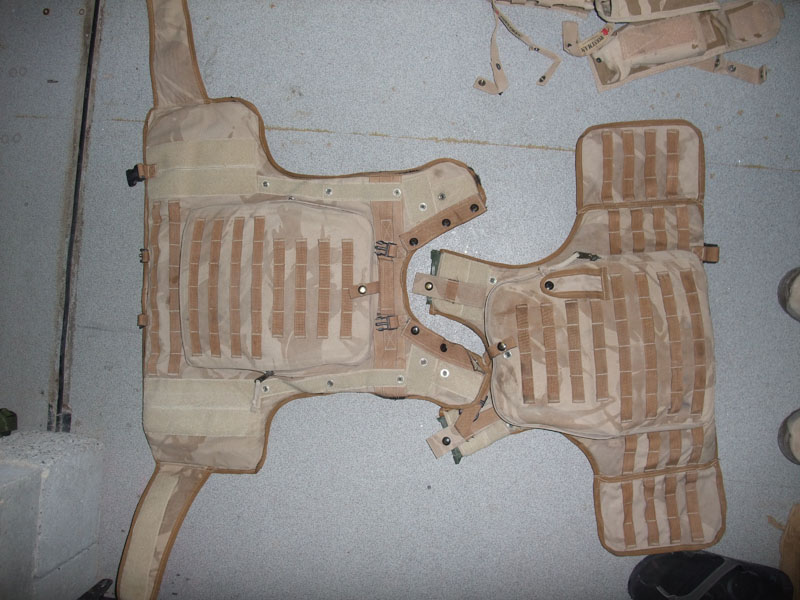
Unassembled Osprey Mk 2 body armour. The wrap around fasteners clearly visible on the rear half (left) were introduced on the Mk 2 covers and help provide the wearer with a more secure and comfortable fit.

The body armour system is designed and manufactured by CQC Ltd, a long-standing UK-based manufacturer that has provided various items for the Ministry of Defence, with some additional batches produced by Solo International Ltd. The Osprey system is modular and built around two vest halves which, when assembled, cover the wearer's torso. The vest has Pouch Attachment Ladder System-type webbing loops stitched to the outside to act as attachment points for compatible pouches and accessories, removing the need to wear a webbing harness or assault vest over the armour (though a "Load Carrying Tactical Vest" was issued with early iterations of the armour). A grab handle on the rear of the vest allows an injured wearer to be dragged behind cover by their comrades. Fastex buckles on the vest may be used for the fitting of a hydration bladder or a personal load carrying equipment daysack pouch on the rear and a respirator haversack on the bottom left, and there is also provision for attaching a rank slide to the vest.

The body armour consists of front and rear soft armour panels, which are inserted into the vest (preferably after the hard armour plates have been added) and secured with the aid of Velcro hook and loop fasteners, and front and rear ceramic hard armour plates which are inserted into dedicated pockets (external pockets on Mk 1 to Mk 3A vests, internal pockets on Mk 4 and Mk 4A vests) and protected by a rubber-edged cover intended to avoid wear and tear in routine use. These plates are of sufficient size to cover both the upper and lower torso. The smaller hard armour plates that were used with Enhanced Combat Body Armour are inserted into side pockets (integral to Mk 1, Mk 2, Mk 3, and Mk 3A vests, integrated into cummerbunds issued with Mk 4 vest) or dedicated side pouches (Mk 4A vest) for additional lower torso protection, though they can also be used as an alternative to the larger Osprey front and rear armour plates, with the relevant pockets being located in the same place as those for the Osprey-specific plates. Optional collar attachments (available in half and full versions) and arm protectors (consisting of brassards and shoulder guards), each with their own soft armour fillers, provide further protection; an Osprey vest thus configured is referred to as 'Complete Fighting Order', but normally the vest is worn in 'Light Fighting Order' without the addition of collar and arm protection.

The armour system is not currently issued to personnel stationed in the UK, and instead retained in theatre and issued to troops during inward processing. Training is undertaken using earlier versions of Osprey.

=== Accessories ===
The Osprey Body Armour is complemented by the Under Body Armour Combat Shirt (UBACS), but can be worn over the CS95 and PCS jacket. The UBACS torso is made of wicking CoolMax fabric with soft protection in the shoulders and sleeves.

The pouch system consists of a range of accessories that can be fitted to the vest, allowing an easily configurable load carrying capability that can be tailored to the needs of the individual user. This includes a range of magazine, machine gun link, hand grenade, and 40x46mm pouches as well as utility pouches and medical packs. These accessories are mounted using the PALS tape and can also be fitted to any other equipment with this arrangement, such as the issued MTP 45 litre patrol daysack [NSN: 8465-99-213-3777].

Soldiers were discouraged from carrying items such as bayonets, pens, or cyalume torches on the front of the Osprey vest in order to prevent facial injury in the event of a blast. The combined weight of the Osprey vest, the body armour carried within the vest, and pouches attached to the vest meant that some wearers went back to using the earlier PLCE webbing.

== Variants ==
=== Mk 1 ===
Large ballistic plates at the front and back with the assembly as described, offering significant improvements over the protection offered by the preceding Enhanced Combat Body Armour.

=== Mk 2 ===
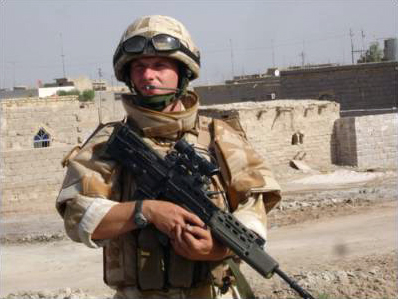
An RAF Regiment Gunner wearing Osprey Mk 2 body armour with arm and collar protection in the outskirts of Basrah City, Iraq

This version was first issued in 2007. The vest was improved by the use of modified pouches, a drop sling attachment on the shoulder to support an L85A2 rifle in lieu of the standard L85A2 sling, and improved construction quality. The press studs were modified so that they could only be undone in one direction (as opposed to the multi-directional studs of the Mk 1 vest). A waist cummerbund belt was introduced to improve the fit and comfort of the vest. This version also saw the introduction of separately fitted arm and collar protection.

=== Mk 3 ===
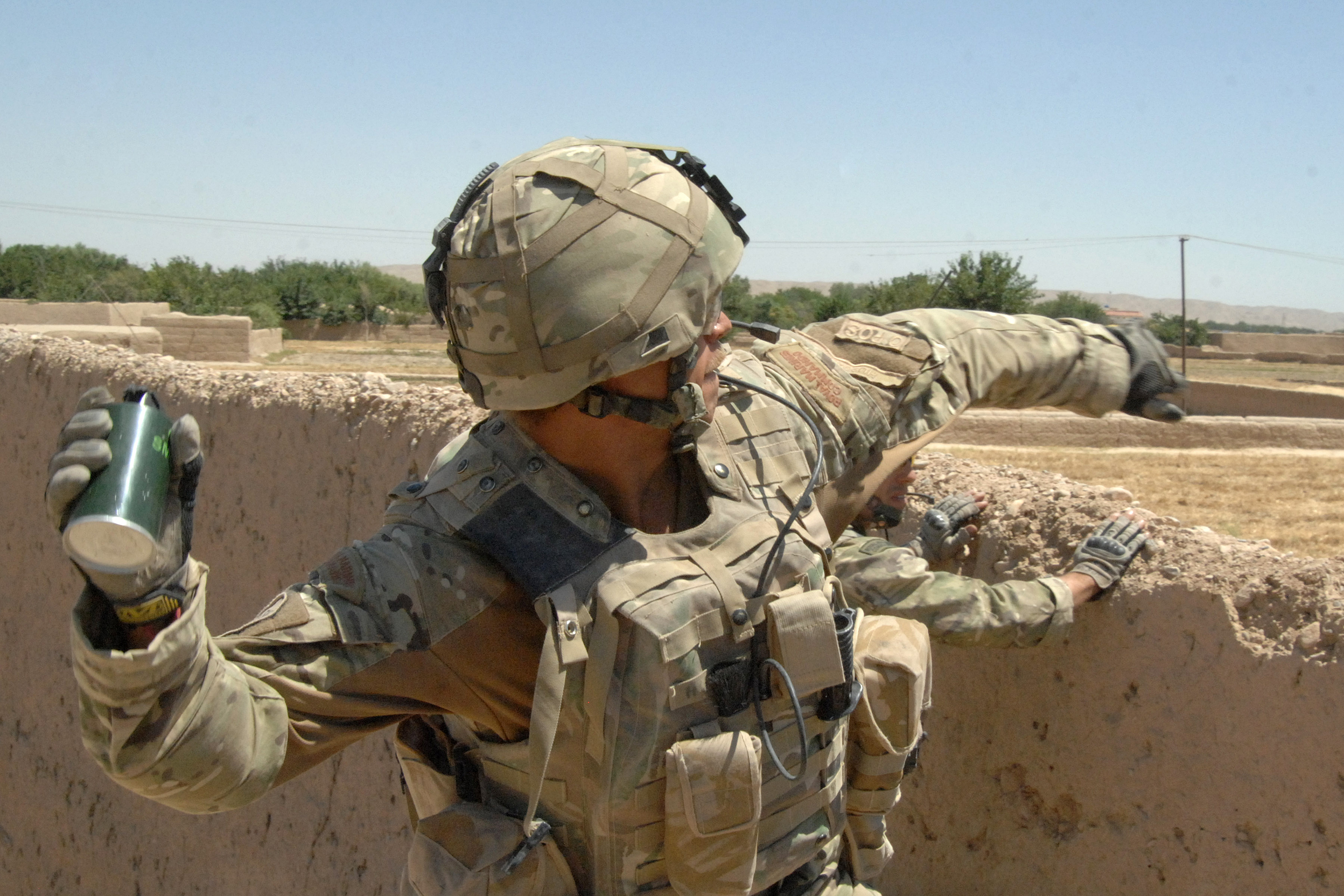
A Royal Marine with 40 Commando on operations in Afghanistan while wearing Osprey Mk 3A body armour, as indicated by the studs on the front armour flap

Improvements to the armour included the addition of a more robust right hand shoulder assembly and a non-slip shoulder pad for improved aiming of weapon systems. An Mk 3 A version was issued with studs on the plate pockets to better secure the hard armour plates and retaining straps over the side panels to reduce instances of the velcro opening when under stress. This had been mitigated in earlier vests by the use of a bungee cord around the armour, hooked to the PALS webbing. The vest was mostly produced in Desert Disruptive Pattern Material camouflage, though versions in an experimental multi-terrain version of Disruptive Pattern Material developed during PECOC were also fielded and limited production was undertaken of a version in regular Disruptive Pattern Material.

=== Mk 4 ===
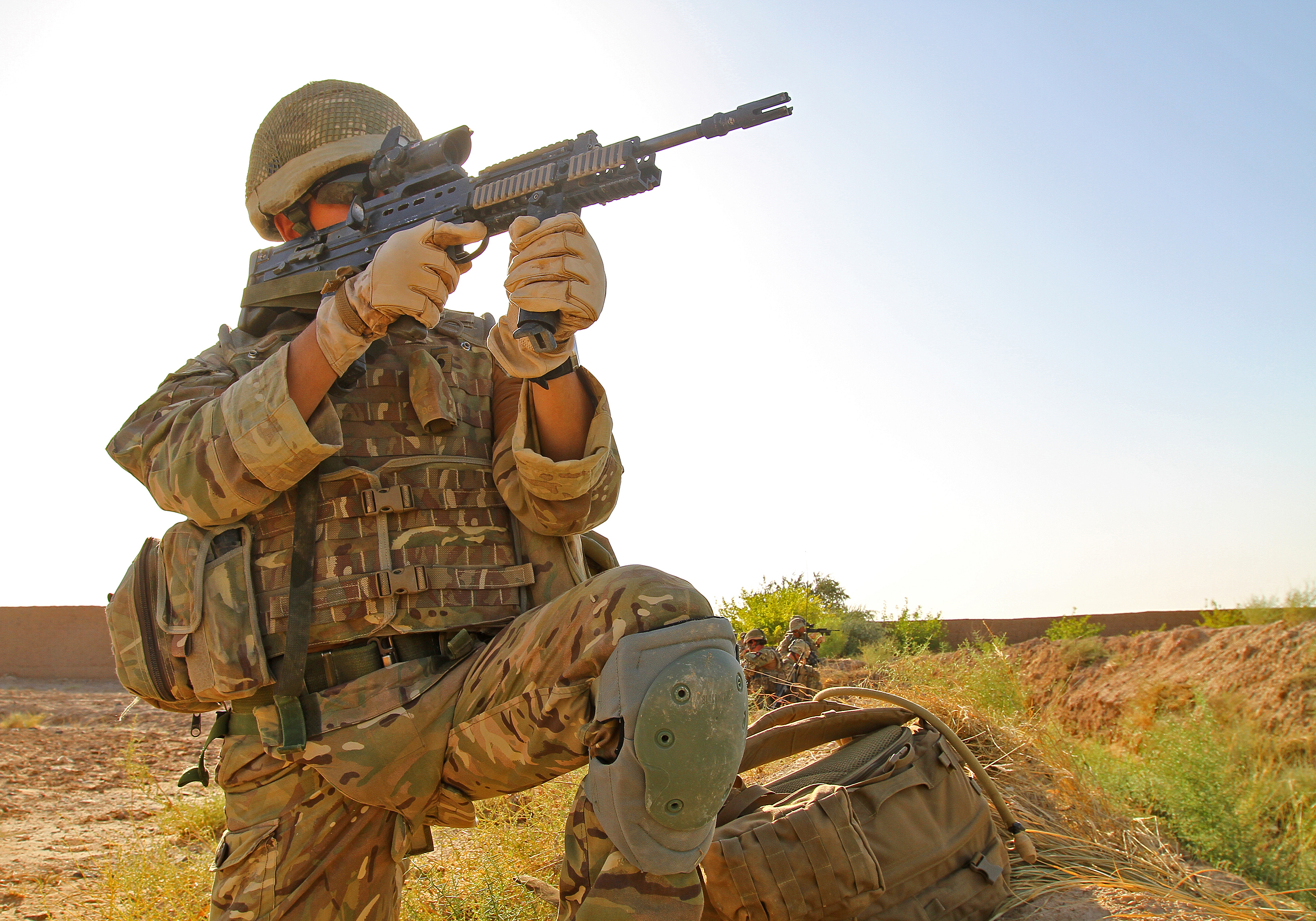
A medic with 4th Battalion, The Royal Regiment of Scotland, on operations in Afghanistan while wearing Osprey Mk 4 body armour

Developed by June 2009 and introduced in April 2010, Osprey Assault Mk 4 body armour (later simplified to Osprey Mk 4 body armour) was made available in Desert Disruptive Pattern Material camouflage, a solid tan colour, and the new Multi-Terrain camouflage, though an olive version was demonstrated in 2010 and CQC offers a closely related 'Rhino' body armour set in regular Disruptive Pattern Material camouflage. Modifications were made to the velcro coverage to improve fastening security and soldiers were given a choice between an OPS panel with adjustable T Bar fittings and a pair of cummerbunds fitted with adjustable front webbing straps and featuring pockets for side hard armour plates. Finally, the most striking change when compared to previous iterations is that the front and rear hard armour plates are now carried internally rather than in an external pocket; combined with the plates being made thinner without reducing effectiveness, this means that the Mk 4 vest provides the same ballistic protection as earlier Osprey vests while being more comfortable to wear, closer fitting, and easier to move in. A ribbed material lining on the inside of the vest improves breathability in hotter climates such as that of Afghanistan. The Mk 4 vest has a higher number of webbing loops and the pouch assortment was increased to twenty-three, with additions including a "commander's pouch" for holding stationery and open SA80 magazine pouches with elastic draw-cords for easier access to ammunition.

A modified version of the Mk 4, known as the Mk 4A, eliminated the outer cummerbund and replaced it with pouches for carrying the side armour plates. This gave a further weight reduction and allowed for more flexibility when positioning the side plates; it also allowed the OPS panel to be worn along with the side plates. The basic design of the main vest and the armour inserts was unaltered. By 2015, over 76,000 Mk 4 and 35,000 Mk 4A vests had been manufactured for British Armed Forces use.

== Criticism ==
Each generation of Osprey has been subjected to some form of criticism from users and journalists. Initial criticisms of the first generation were related to the significant increase in weight, and size of the ballistic plates, compared with the existing ECBA. The quality of the manufacture of versions 1 and 2 has been criticised with reports of seams and fasteners tearing open in normal use. First generation pouches were criticised for poor stability on the cover, with some infantry identifying that pouches designed to hold two magazines did not securely hold three, and that the scale of issue was inadequate to hold a standard patrol ammunition load of six magazines.
