= Ian Malone =

British Army soldier

Lance Corporal Ian Malone (8 December 1974 – 6 April 2003) from Dublin, Ireland, was a member of the British Army's Irish Guards. He was the first person born in Ireland to be killed in the Iraq War. Malone's funeral in Dublin was the first funeral with a uniformed British military presence in the Republic of Ireland.

== Background ==
Twenty-eight-year-old Ian Malone came from a working class background in the Dublin suburb of Ballyfermot. The eldest of a family of five, Malone was educated by the De La Salle Christian Brothers Catholic school. He served in FCA, the Irish reserve defence force. It is claimed that he applied to join the Irish Army but was rejected due to his age. When he joined the Irish Guards in 1997, a regiment of the British Army created in 1900 by Queen Victoria, he was 23 years old and the age limits for the Irish Army at that time was over 17 years and under 21 years of age (with the age limit extended to a max of 25 years if the recruit held a 3rd Level Degree) .

== Military service ==
Malone was promoted to lance corporal in October 2000 and served on Operation Agricola in Kosovo. He completed a piper's course in April 1999, and was a member of the pipe band. He also served with the Battle Group in Poland, Canada, Oman and Germany.

In November 2002 Lance Corporal Malone was one of a number of British soldiers interviewed on a Radio Telefís Éireann documentary series, True Lives. Regarding his membership of the British Army, he said:

At the end of the day I am just abroad doing a job. People go on about Irishmen dying for freedom and all that. That's a fair one. They did. But they died to give men like me the freedom to choose what to do.

Malone was deployed on Operation Telic in an armoured infantry section with Number 1 Company, Irish Guards, as part of the Royal Scots Dragoon Guards Battle Group within 7 Armoured Brigade. Lance Corporal Malone was shot in the head by a sniper on 6 April in Iraq during the Irish Guards' advance on the country's second largest city, Basra.

== Funeral ==
The removal of Lance Corporal Malone's body to Our Lady of the Assumption Catholic church in Ballyfermot was attended by hundreds of people, including Charlie O'Connor, a local TD, whose father had served in the Irish Guards. His funeral on 24 April 2003 was celebrated by Fr. Dave Lumsden and drew large crowds, including senior politicians from the opposition such as Gay Mitchell, TD. An honour guard of the Irish Guards in their full dress uniform was provided, though the coffin was not draped in the Union Flag. One piper from the Irish Guard and one piper from the Irish Defence Forces, 2inf bn Cq C o'Dywer PM, played at the funeral, Oft in the stilly night. Mass. His funeral was the first time since 1922, that uniformed British Army soldiers had been seen in Dublin.
