= 2021 Africa Cup of Nations Group B =

Football tournament group stage

Group B of the 2021 Africa Cup of Nations took place from 10 to 18 January 2022. The group consisted of Guinea, Malawi, Senegal and Zimbabwe.

Senegal and Guinea as the top two teams, along with Malawi as one of the four best third-placed teams, advanced to the round of 16.

== Teams ==
Draw position	Team	Zone	Method of qualification	Date of qualification	Finals appearance	Last appearance	Previous best performance	FIFA Rankings	
Draw position	Team	Zone	Method of qualification	Date of qualification	Finals appearance	Last appearance	Previous best performance	May 2021 (Note: The rankings of May 2021 were used for seeding for the final draw.)	December 2021
B1	Senegal	WAFU	Group I winners	15 November 2020	16th	2019	Runners-up (2002, 2019)	22	20
B2	Zimbabwe	COSAFA	Group H runners-up	25 March 2021	5th	2019	Group stage (2004, 2006, 2017, 2019)	107	121
B3	Guinea	WAFU	Group A runners-up	24 March 2021	13th	2019	Runners-up (1976)	72	81
B4	Malawi	COSAFA	Group B runners-up	29 March 2021	3rd	2010	Group stage (1984, 2010)	115	129

== Standings ==
Pos	Team	Pld	W	D	L	GF	GA	GD	Pts	Qualification
1	Senegal	3	1	2	0	1	0	+1	5	Advance to knockout stage
2	Guinea	3	1	1	1	2	2	0	4 (Note: Head-to-head result: Guinea 1–0 Malawi.)	Advance to knockout stage
3	Malawi	3	1	1	1	2	2	0	4	Advance to knockout stage
4	Zimbabwe	3	1	0	2	3	4	−1	3	

Source: CAF
Rules for classification: Group stage tiebreakers

== Matches ==
=== Senegal vs Zimbabwe ===
10 January 2022
14:00

Senegal	1–0	Zimbabwe
Mané 90+7' (pen.)	Report

Kouekong Stadium, Bafoussam
Referee: Mario Escobar (Guatemala)

Senegal	Zimbabwe

GK	1	Seny Dieng
RB	21	Ibrahima Mbaye
CB	4	Pape Abou Cissé
CB	22	Abdou Diallo
LB	12	Fodé Ballo-Touré
CM	20	Bouna Sarr
CM	8	Cheikhou Kouyaté
CM	5	Idrissa Gueye (c)
RF	9	Boulaye Dia		(substituted off) 77'
CF	10	Sadio Mané
LF	7	Keita Baldé	(yellow card) 31'	(substituted off) 64'
Substitutions:
FW	11	Habib Diallo		(substituted on) 64'
MF	26	Pape Gueye		(substituted on) 77'
Manager:
Aliou Cissé

GK	1	Petros Mhari
RB	22	Takudzwa Chimwemwe
CB	5	Gerald Takwara
CB	15	Teenage Hadebe	(yellow card) 52'
LB	14	Onismor Bhasera
DM	4	Kelvin Madzongwe	(yellow card) 90+5'
RM	7	Ishmael Wadi
CM	17	Knowledge Musona (c)		(substituted off) 88'
CM	8	Kundai Benyu		(substituted off) 71'
LM	12	Bruce Kangwa
CF	18	Prince Dube		(substituted off) 46'
Substitutions:
FW	10	Tino Kadewere		(substituted on) 46'
MF	13	Thabani Kamusoko		(substituted on) 71'
MF	11	Never Tigere		(substituted on) 88'
Manager:
Norman Mapeza

Man of the Match:
Sadio Mané (Senegal)

Assistant referees:
Olivier Safari (DR Congo)
Attia Amsaaed (Libya)
Fourth official:
Jean-Jacques Ndala (DR Congo)
Video assistant referee:
Fernando Guerrero (Mexico)
Assistant video assistant referee:
Fatiha Jermoumi (Morocco)

=== Guinea vs Malawi ===
10 January 2022
17:00

Guinea	1–0	Malawi
I. Sylla 35'	Report

Kouekong Stadium, Bafoussam
Referee: Daniel Nii Laryea (Ghana)

Guinea	Malawi

GK	1	Aly Keita
CB	5	Saïdou Sow		(substituted off) 71'
CB	13	Mohamed Ali Camara
CB	4	Ibrahima Conté II	(yellow card) 75'
RWB	19	Mamadou Kané
LWB	3	Issiaga Sylla
CM	23	Aguibou Camara		(substituted off) 46'
CM	6	Amadou Diawara
CM	8	Naby Keïta (c)
CF	9	José Kanté		(substituted off) 71'
CF	11	Mohamed Bayo		(substituted off) 88'
Substitutions:
MF	7	Ibrahima Cissé		(substituted on) 46'
DF	17	Ousmane Kanté		(substituted on) 71'
FW	25	Mamadou Diallo		(substituted on) 71'
FW	21	Sory Kaba		(substituted on) 88'
Manager:
Kaba Diawara

GK	16	Ernest Kakhobwe
CB	21	Chikoti Chirwa
CB	19	Limbikani Mzava (c)
CB	5	Dennis Chembezi
RM	7	Micium Mhone
CM	8	Chimwemwe Idana	(yellow card) 81'
CM	17	John Banda
LM	10	Francisco Madinga
AM	13	Peter Banda		(substituted off) 80'
CF	20	Yamikani Chester		(substituted off) 65'
CF	22	Khuda Muyaba
Substitutions:
FW	9	Richard Mbulu	(yellow card) 83'	(substituted on) 65'
FW	18	Zebron Kalima		(substituted on) 80'
Manager:
(Romania) Mario Marinică

Man of the Match:
Naby Keita (Guinea)

Assistant referees:
Seydou Tiama (Burkina Faso)
Samuel Pwadutakam (Nigeria)
Fourth official:
Salima Mukansanga (Rwanda)
Video assistant referee:
Victor Gomes (South Africa)
Assistant video assistant referee:
Mustapha Akarkad (Morocco)

=== Senegal vs Guinea ===
14 January 2022
14:00

Senegal	0–0	Guinea
	Report

Kouekong Stadium, Bafoussam
Referee: Bamlak Tessema Weyesa (Ethiopia)

Senegal	Guinea

GK	1	Seny Dieng
RB	21	Ibrahima Mbaye
CB	4	Pape Abou Cissé
CB	22	Abdou Diallo
LB	2	Saliou Ciss
CM	25	Mamadou Loum
CM	8	Cheikhou Kouyaté	(yellow card) 74'
RW	20	Bouna Sarr		(substituted off) 90'
AM	10	Sadio Mané (c)
LW	27	Mame Thiam		(substituted off) 74'
CF	9	Boulaye Dia		(substituted off) 81'
Substitutions:
FW	11	Habib Diallo		(substituted on) 74'
MF	13	Joseph Lopy		(substituted on) 81'
FW	7	Keita Baldé		(substituted on) 90'
Manager:
Aliou Cissé

GK	1	Aly Keita	(yellow card) 83'
CB	5	Saïdou Sow
CB	13	Mohamed Ali Camara
CB	4	Ibrahima Conté II
RWB	7	Ibrahima Cissé
LWB	3	Issiaga Sylla	(yellow card) 80'
CM	14	Ilaix Moriba		(substituted off) 66'
CM	6	Amadou Diawara	(yellow card) 49'	(substituted off) 78'
CM	8	Naby Keïta (c)	(yellow card) 64'
CF	11	Mohamed Bayo
CF	10	Morgan Guilavogui		(substituted off) 90'
Substitutions:
MF	12	Ibrahima Conté I		(substituted on) 66'
MF	24	Mory Konaté		(substituted on) 78'
MF	2	Morlaye Sylla		(substituted on) 90'
Manager:
Kaba Diawara

Man of the Match:
Naby Keïta (Guinea)

Assistant referees:
Souru Phatsoane (Lesotho)
James Fredrick Emile (Seychelles)
Fourth official:
Mario Escobar (Guatemala)
Video assistant referee:
Samir Guezzaz (Morocco)
Assistant video assistant referee:
Fatiha Jermoumi (Morocco)

=== Malawi vs Zimbabwe ===
14 January 2022
17:00

Malawi	2–1	Zimbabwe
Mhango 43', 58'	Report	Wadi 38'

Kouekong Stadium, Bafoussam
Referee: Dahane Beida (Mauritania)

Malawi	Zimbabwe

GK	16	Ernest Kakhobwe	(yellow card) 90+1'
CB	21	Chikoti Chirwa
CB	19	Limbikani Mzava (c)		(substituted off) 27'
CB	5	Dennis Chembezi
RM	2	Stanley Sanudi	(yellow card) 49'
CM	17	John Banda
CM	8	Chimwemwe Idana		(substituted off) 84'
LM	10	Francisco Madinga		(substituted off) 84'
AM	11	Gabadinho Mhango
CF	9	Richard Mbulu		(substituted off) 66'
CF	22	Khuda Muyaba		(substituted off) 66'
Substitutions:
DF	15	Lawrence Chaziya		(substituted on) 27'
FW	13	Peter Banda		(substituted on) 66'
FW	20	Yamikani Chester		(substituted on) 66'
MF	27	Gerald Phiri Jr.		(substituted on) 84'
MF	3	Charles Petro		(substituted on) 84'
Manager:
(Romania) Mario Marinică

GK	1	Petros Mhari
RB	22	Takudzwa Chimwemwe
CB	5	Gerald Takwara
CB	15	Teenage Hadebe	(yellow card) 29'
LB	14	Onismor Bhasera
DM	4	Kelvin Madzongwe	(yellow card) 83'
RM	7	Ishmael Wadi		(substituted off) 84'
CM	17	Knowledge Musona (c)		(substituted off) 78'
CM	8	Kundai Benyu
LM	12	Bruce Kangwa	(yellow card) 20'	(substituted off) 67'
CF	10	Tino Kadewere
Substitutions:
DF	3	Jordan Zemura		(substituted on) 67'
FW	19	Admiral Muskwe		(substituted on) 78'
MF	16	Kudakwashe Mahachi		(substituted on) 84'
Manager:
Norman Mapeza

Man of the Match:
Gabadinho Mhango (Malawi)

Assistant referees:
Mahamadou Yahaya (Niger)
Samuel Pwadutakam (Nigeria)
Fourth official:
Salima Mukansanga (Rwanda)
Video assistant referee:
Bouchra Karboubi (Morocco)
Assistant video assistant referee:
Zakaria Brinsi (Morocco)

=== Malawi vs Senegal ===
18 January 2022
17:00

Malawi	0–0	Senegal
	Report

Kouekong Stadium, Bafoussam
Referee: Blaise Yuven Ngwa (Cameroon)

Malawi	Senegal

GK	1	Charles Thomu	(yellow card) 83'
RB	2	Stanley Sanudi
CB	15	Lawrence Chaziya	(yellow card) 58'
CB	5	Dennis Chembezi
LB	21	Gomezgani Chirwa
RM	7	Micium Mhone		(substituted off) 67'
CM	8	Chimwemwe Idana		(substituted off) 79'
CM	17	John Banda (c)
LM	10	Francisco Madinga		(substituted off) 79'
CF	22	Khuda Muyaba		(substituted off) 67'
CF	11	Gabadinho Mhango
Substitutions:
FW	9	Richard Mbulu		(substituted on) 67'
FW	20	Yamikani Chester		(substituted on) 67'
MF	27	Gerald Phiri Jr.		(substituted on) 79'
FW	14	Robin Ngalande		(substituted on) 79'
Manager:
(Romania) Mario Marinică

GK	16	Édouard Mendy
RB	20	Bouna Sarr
CB	3	Kalidou Koulibaly (c)
CB	22	Abdou Diallo
LB	2	Saliou Ciss		(substituted off) 86'
CM	8	Cheikhou Kouyaté	(yellow card) 20'
CM	6	Nampalys Mendy		(substituted off) 72'
CM	5	Idrissa Gueye
RF	9	Boulaye Dia		(substituted off) 72'
CF	11	Habib Diallo		(substituted off) 60'
LF	10	Sadio Mané
Substitutions:
FW	15	Bamba Dieng		(substituted on) 60'
MF	26	Pape Gueye	(yellow card) 75'	(substituted on) 72'
FW	19	Famara Diédhiou		(substituted on) 72'
DF	12	Fodé Ballo-Touré		(substituted on) 86'
Manager:
Aliou Cissé

Man of the Match:
Charles Thomu (Malawi)

Assistant referees:
Elvis Guy Noupue Nguegoue (Cameroon)
Olivier Safari (DR Congo)
Fourth official:
Daniel Nii Laryea (Ghana)
Video assistant referee:
Mehdi Abid Charef (Algeria)
Assistant video assistant referee:
Mokrane Gourari (Algeria)

=== Zimbabwe vs Guinea ===
18 January 2022
17:00

Zimbabwe	2–1	Guinea
Musona 26'; Mahachi 43'	Report	Keïta 49'

Ahmadou Ahidjo Stadium, Yaoundé
Referee: Salima Mukansanga (Rwanda)

Zimbabwe	Guinea

GK	21	Talbert Shumba	(yellow card) 56'
RB	2	Godknows Murwira
CB	20	Peter Muduhwa
CB	5	Gerald Takwara
LB	12	Bruce Kangwa
DM	13	Thabani Kamusoko
RM	16	Kudakwashe Mahachi	(yellow card) 86'	(substituted off) 88'
CM	11	Never Tigere
CM	17	Knowledge Musona (c)		(substituted off) 46'
LM	3	Jordan Zemura		(substituted off) 75'
CF	19	Admiral Muskwe		(substituted off) 75'
Substitutions:
DF	14	Onismor Bhasera	(yellow card) 90+1'	(substituted on) 46'
FW	10	Tino Kadewere		(substituted on) 75'
FW	18	Prince Dube		(substituted on) 75'
DF	22	Takudzwa Chimwemwe		(substituted on) 88'
Manager:
Norman Mapeza

GK	1	Aly Keita
CB	17	Ousmane Kanté
CB	13	Mohamed Ali Camara
CB	4	Ibrahima Conté II
RWB	7	Ibrahima Cissé	(yellow card) 34'
LWB	3	Issiaga Sylla		(substituted off) 88'
CM	14	Ilaix Moriba		(substituted off) 63'
CM	19	Mamadou Kané	(yellow card) 90+3'
CM	8	Naby Keïta (c)	(yellow card) 90+1'
CF	21	Sory Kaba		(substituted off) 63'
CF	9	José Kanté		(substituted off) 46'
Substitutions:
FW	25	Mamadou Diallo		(substituted on) 46'
MF	2	Morlaye Sylla		(substituted on) 63'
FW	11	Mohamed Bayo		(substituted on) 63'
DF	20	Pa Konate		(substituted on) 88'
Manager:
(France) Kaba Diawara

Man of the Match:
Gerald Takwara (Zimbabwe)

Assistant referees:
Carine Atezambong Fomo (Cameroon)
Fatiha Jermoumi (Morocco)
Fourth official:
Jean-Jacques Ndala (DR Congo)
Video assistant referee:
Bouchra Karboubi (Morocco)
Assistant video assistant referee:
Mohammed Abdallah Ibrahim (Sudan)
