= Mario Marinică =

Romanian footballer and manager (born 1964)

Personal information
- Full name: Marian Marinică
- Date of birth: 13 December 1964 (age 61)
- Place of birth: Bucharest, Romania

Senior career*
Years	Team	Apps	(Gls)
- Rocar București
1987	Dinamo București		
- Steaua București

Managerial career
- 2003: Argeş Piteşti
- 2003–2004: Cimentul Fieni (caretaker)
- 2008–2009: Gloria Buzău (caretaker)
- 2009: Black Leopards
- 2014–2015: Rapid București
- 2021–2023: Malawi
- 2024: Liberia
- 2025–2026: Zimbabwe
- * Club domestic league appearances and goals

Marian "Mario" Marinică (born 13 December 1964) is a Romanian professional football manager and former player who was most recently the head coach of the Zimbabwe national team.

He holds the UEFA Pro Licence, the highest football coaching qualification. At national team level he has been the head coach of Liberia and Malawi. He has coached at Romanian clubs Rapid București, Gloria Buzău, Sportul Studenţesc, Argeş Piteşti, Rocar București, and Cimentul Fieni. He has also coached at Kerala Blasters in India, Azam F.C. in Tanzania, Black Leopards in South Africa, Zakho FC in Iraq, and Kaposvári Rákóczi FC in Hungary. In England, he has worked at Crystal Palace FC and Arsenal FC's Academies as well as Leyton Orient FC's School of Excellence. His playing career included spells at Rocar București, Dinamo București and Steaua București.

== Playing career ==
Mario Marinică featured most notably in the youth and reserve teams at Rocar București, Dinamo București and Steaua București, eventually retiring from playing in 1993. In a 2009 interview with Sport Magazine he commented "I started at Dinamo, then I moved to Steaua. I played as a central midfielder. I also played for Rocar, Mecon and Girueta"

== Coaching career ==
His coaching career commenced in 1993 at Leyton Orient FC. In a varied coaching role, he directed "Football in the Community" courses, and developed players both at the School of Excellence and first team; working closely with Grant Cornwell, John Sitton and Chris Ramsey.

During the 1998–1999 season, he coached Haringey Borough FC. He was both Head of Youth Development and First Team Coach as well as the club's Fitness Trainer. He would later return to the club as first team Manager for a brief spell at the end of the 2005–2006 season. Winning 6 out of the last 7 games, he saved the club from relegation together with his assistant Ged Searson.

From 1999 to 2001, Marinică was a coach at the Arsenal F.C. Academy, primarily in charge of the under-15 team. During this period, as part of an exchange programme he spent a short time assisting Massimo Pedrazzini within the technical department of Internazionale.

In the 2001–02 season, he returned to Rocar București as assistant manager. There, he helped to develop a number of players including Cristian Neamtu, Cristian Silvasan, Ionut Rada, and Silviu Balace, that have since been capped by their country.

During 2002–03, he became a development coach at the Crystal Palace FC Academy. He managed the U15 side, and coached from U14 to U19 levels. He worked with a number of players who have since turned professional and received International honours: Wayne Routledge, Gary Borrowdale, Ben Watson, Tom Soares, Sam Togwell, Lewis Grabban, Rhoys Wiggins, Andrew Julius, David Hunt, Gavin Heeroo, Teerathep Winothai, Will Antwi and Craig Dobson.

At the start of 2003, he was appointed first team coach at Argeş Piteşti, working with players such as Nicolae Dică, Andrei Prepeliţă, Raul Marincău, Marius Bilaşco, and Adrian Iordache.

His progress at Argeş Piteşti brought him to the attention of Liga II club Cimentul Fieni. Towards the end of 2003, he was appointed caretaker manager of the club. Despite limited time and scarce financial and playing resources, he managed to save Fieni from relegation and helped restore pride to the team.

In recent years he has been a member of the Technical Support Staff of the Romanian Football Federation. His coaching and Coach-Educator expertise have been used to help develop their UEFA-A and UEFA-B licence coaching courses. He has also consulted on player development programmes for the U16 through U21 teams. He co-ordinated the 2006 visit to Romania of Howard Wilkinson. The former Technical Director of The Football Association was brought over by Marinica to conduct a session of the Romanian Football Federation's UEFA Pro Licence course.

"I have known Mario for a long time. He is an intellectual coach; methodical, a statistician, and an excellent personality." Mircea Rădulescu, Technical Director of the Romanian Football Federation.

He has been employed by Hertha Berlin, Watford FC, Stockport County FC and Notts County FC for scouting and technical analysis of forthcoming adversaries. He has also been employed to assist Romanian clubs Steaua București and Dinamo București in preparation to face English opposition in European competition. His unsurpassed tactical analysis provided the basis for Steaua București's defeat of Middlesbrough FC and Dinamo București's 5–1 defeat of Everton F.C. in the UEFA Cup. It was the first time Everton F.C. had conceded five goals in European competition.

During the 2006 FIFA World Cup, he assisted the Paraguay national football team, providing technical analysis of their group B rivals: England, Sweden and Trinidad & Tobago.

From 2005 to 2007, he completed the UEFA Pro Licence with the Irish Football Association, graduating alongside him were Chris Coleman, Jim Gannon and Bernard McNally amongst others.

In the 2008–09 season, he was the interim manager of Romanian Liga I side FC Gloria Buzău. He had been initially employed as Technical Director, and developed young players such as Eric Bicfalvi, Alexandru Tudose, and Alin Litu, all of whom became members of the Romania national under-21 team. He took over the Head Coach role in late 2008, and helped turn around a club that had made the worst ever start to a season in the Romanian League. He secured a notable draw, away to traditional powerhouse Steaua București.

In June 2009, he was appointed Manager of South Africa National First Division side Black Leopards. Fans heralded Marinica as 'the messiah' upon his appointment, but after just over a month in the hotseat he had to return to Bucharest due to family problems. Former South Africa national team and then Mamelodi Sundowns coach Ted Dumitru commented at the time; "Mario is a very tactical coach and I'm convinced that he would have turned the team around. He has very strong scientific aspects of hard performance in football."

In July 2010, he was employed as technical director at Romanian Premier League side Sportul Studenţesc, following speculation linking him with the Zambia national football team job. Marinica then took on a role as assistant manager of Hungarian Premier league club Kaposvári Rákóczi FC, he then left the position to take on a similar role with Romanian giants Rapid București.

In December 2014, he was linked with the vacant manager's job at English Conference National side AFC Telford United.

Marinica left his advisory technical role at Rapid București in March 2015, he released a short statement saying " it was a pleasure to work at one of the greatest names in Romanian football, unfortunately financial constraints at the club have forced me to leave from my role, I wish the club the fans and the owners all the best at helping to return this magnificent football club where they belong".

June 2015 saw Marinica take up the Director of Football role alongside Stewart Hall as Azam F.C. made a major overhaul of their technical staff with an eye on a successful campaign on the Confederation of Africa Federations (CAF) competition. Marinica was able to help alongside Stewart Hall in leading the club to securing their first Kegame Interclub cup title without conceding a single goal, the trophy is contested among the best teams in central and eastern Africa. September 2016 saw him take up the Assistant Manager role at Zakho FC working with Marian Mihail.

In February 2017, he was initially announced as Head Coach of Forest Rangers. Forest chairperson Benhail Mukuka said the club was excited to have signed Marinica, who comes with success from his stint in Tanzania. However shortly afterwards, Perry Mutapa was announced instead, with the club not elaborating over the reversal of the appointment.

September 2017 saw him join Ion Moldovan's technical staff at Romanian premier division club Concordia Chiajna.

In 2019, he joined as the Technical Director of the Indian Super League club Kerala Blasters FC and its youth academy and their reserve squad. He spoke about the programme and his vision for developing football from the grassroots level. Under the new Technical Director, all youth teams as well as the reserve teams are training under the same philosophy. This approach will make the player transition smoother and easier during promotions to higher teams. On 7 March 2020, Kerala Blasters Reserves beat Gokulam FC in the final of Kerala Premier League (KPL) at Calicut Corporation Stadium to lift the first trophy in their short history. Marinica was also appointed by the All India Football Federation as a Grassroots Football Technical Panel Member through to the end of 2021.

=== Malawi ===
November 2021 saw Marinica appointed as Technical Director of the Football Association of Malawi on a three-year contract. Speaking at the appointment, Football Association of Malawi President Walter Nyamilandu commented "He is here to develop Malawi football and to correct some shortfalls that are there. As an association, we want to play football the right way. We need to produce quality coaches who will take Malawian football to another level. There has always been a gap especially when playing international games so Mario is here to bridge the gap. We don't want shortcuts and we want to be better organized as he champions the agenda of football development. I want to live behind a football philosophy that will suit our nation. We need to embrace change. With him, I expect technical issues to be the number one priority by paying more attention to grassroots football and youth football before bringing everything together for the betterment of our game. Mario comes into this position with lots of experience and is not new in this environment. He has worked in Africa and his profile on the continent is well documented," said Nyamilandu.

Marinica said it's a huge challenge working for a nation with lots of potential and is very optimistic that within three years, he will achieve what he has been employed for. "Huge challenge to have a small nation with huge talent. My first task is to build structures, scouting network and to receive help and support from all relevant stakeholders to develop the game starting with grassroots football because that's the basis of football.It won't be easy because every job has a challenge and I am ready for it. I have once worked with a few Malawian players notably Robert Ng'ambi at Black Leopards and from the onset, you could tell that we have talent in Malawi. I want to help in nurturing the talent not only for the national team but as Ambassadors ready for international market," he said.

=== African Cup of Nations 2021 ===
Having only just been appointed Technical Director, on 6 December it was then announced that he will lead Malawi at the 2021 Africa Cup of Nations after the country's football association (Fam) re-organised its technical set-up. The previous manager, Meck Mwase would stay on as First Assistant Coach before resuming his former role after the tournament, when Marinica would return to his Technical Director role.

Ahead of the tournament the team held a 10-day camp in Saudi Arabia, as part of a technical partnership with the Saudi Arabian Football Federation. The camp was affected by Covid, with some players unable to travel, others joining later, and more infected during the camp. Friendlies against Mali and local teams had to be cancelled, although the friendly against Comoros went ahead on 31 December 2021. In Marinica's first game in charge, Malawi beat Comoros 2–1 with goals from Gabadinho Mhango and Khuda Muyaba

Marinica named his 28-man squad for the tournament, with 23 in the main squad for the tournament and five as reserves. He called up three uncapped players in goalkeeper Charles Thomu, defender Lawrence Chaziya and midfielder Zebron Kalima, and omitted experienced midfielder Gerald Phiri Jr. from the main squad. Phiri subsequently retired from international football. Commenting on his selection, Marinica said "it was very tough particularly because of the COVID-19 situation. We had quite a number of players who would have made it in the 28-man squad but unfortunately COVID has ruled them out" He outlined his philosophy and approach "of playing fast and very fast, thinking fast, acting fast and moving fast, being well prepared and organised."

==== Group B (Guinea, Zimbabwe, Senegal) ====
Ahead of their first Group B game against Guinea, Malawi were hit hard by positive Covid tests in the camp. On 9 January, six players and three technical staff including Marinica tested positive. In addition, key players Mark Fodya and Charles Petro had remained in Saudi Arabia having tested positive there.

Due to the Covid outbreak, Malawi were only able to name a matchday squad of 15 for the match against Guinea, with just two outfield players on the bench. Meck Mwase lead the team from the bench with Marinica in isolation. Issiaga Sylla scored the only goal to help Guinea to a narrow 1–0 victory. The Syli National had to dig deep against the brilliant Flames who were competitive throughout the contest at the Stade de Kouekong in Baffousam. Depleted Malawi were left to rue missed opportunities - they had the lion's share of the chances and found Guinea goalkeeper Aly Keita in inspired form.

On 10 January, FAM announced that it had recalled the five players that were on the reserve list to join the team in Cameroon with Gerald Phiri Jr. convinced to rescind his retirement. Initially CAF had indicated that only 23 players in the final squad will be eligible to take part in the competition while the other extra five, that were registered at the discretion of participating teams, will be on reserve and would only be replaced in case of serious injury. CAF specified that the injury had to be certified through MRI Scan by the CAF Medical Committee and COVID-19 was not regarded as a serious injury. With increased cases of COVID-19 being experienced across the participating teams, the rule was relaxed.

As per the CAF 2021 AFCON pre-match protocols the Flames players and officials underwent a COVID-19 PCR test, 48 hours before the team's second group B match against Zimbabwe. All the 28 players tested negative, though unfortunately Mario Marinica continued to test positive and remained in isolation for the fixture. Once again first assistant coach, Meck Mwase lead from the bench. In an open and entertaining game, Zimbabwe went ahead through a superb header from Ishmael Wadi but Gabadinho Mhango equalised five minutes later with a controlled half-volley. Mhango then added his second after 58 minutes as he took advantage of some hesitant defending and supplied a poacher's finish. Malawi beat Zimbabwe 2–1 to boost their hopes of a first-ever appearance in the last 16 at the Africa Cup of Nations.

The team received a boost ahead of their final group B game against Senegal, with all players and coaching staff including Marinica testing COVID negative. He made three changes to the side that defeated Zimbabwe a few days prior, with Charles Thomu making his full debut in goal in place of Ernest Kakhobwe who was ill with malaria, Micium Mhone returned for Richard Mbulu whilst Lawrence Chaziya replaced Limbikani Mzava who sustained a hamstring injury during the Zimbabwe game. Marinica chose to start with four attacking players against a full strength Senegal side featuring stars Sadio Mane, Edouard Mendy, Idrissa Gueye and Kalidou Koulibaly who struggled to convince in a goalless draw. Malawi just needed a goal to win the game and the group, and were initially awarded a penalty in the 75th minute, which was subsequently overturned by VAR. Debutant goalie Charles Thomu won the Man of the Match award for some sharp saves. BBC Sport Africa's Salim Masoud Said wrote "Mario Marinica only had a few weeks to prepare his Malawi team. Based on their first half you may think Aliou Cisse is the one who has had weeks, not years, to prepare Senegal." The result was sufficient for Malawi to reach the last 16 for the first time, where they would face Group C winners Morocco on 25 January in Yaounde.

==== Last 16 (Morocco) ====
Morocco came into the game ranked 28th in the world, 101 places above the Flames, and unbeaten in 30 matches, including 21 clean sheets. Marinica named an unchanged starting line-up against a Morocco side replete with European-based players. Malawi took a shock lead thanks to a 7th minute wonderstrike from Gabadinho Mhango. The Guardian described the goal thus "A goal for the ages! Chirwa plays a ball down the left channel for Mhango, who has his back to goal, 30 to 35 yards out. He turns infield, spots the keeper off his line, and whips a huge dipping curler into the top right from silly distance! Bono wasn't even too far out; he was on the edge of his six-yard box when he was beaten. Unstoppable! Unstoppable from 35 yards!" With two minutes of added time to the break Youssef En-Nesyri equalised when he nodded in a well taken Sofiane Boufal corner kick. Malawi cushioned a lot of pressure as the Atlas Lions dominated most of the play in the first half with seven shots on target against Malawi's one. After a lot of pressure on the Malawian defending line, Morocco scored to make it 2-1 after 70 minutes. Achraf Hakimi beautifully curled in a free kick that beat goalkeeper Charles Thomu, prompting Kylian Mbappé to post on Twitter "Achraf Hakimi, Best RB in the World" about his Paris Saint-Germain teammate. In the post match press conference, Vahid Halilhodzic commented "It was not an easy game. When we conceded the goal, it made my team react and it was very complex. In the second half we didn't lose concentration and managed to organize ourselves and take control of the game". Mario Marinica commented "We worked and were very close. Personally, I tried to exploit the opportunities I had. We played against a very good team. However, I am proud of the performance of my players. Gabadinho is a good player and, as you saw, each player gave his best. I believe Gaba has the potential to play at the highest level. Our game plan happened as we wanted, but I have to admit that we played against a fantastic opponent".

==== Summary ====
In summary, Peter Kanjere writing in the New Frame wrote "From being underwhelming underdogs going into the tournament to reaching the round of 16, the Flames have shown discipline, flair and dedication, to the utter delight of their fans. Reaching the last 16 is a remarkable achievement for the Flames considering that they are a modest squad with no big-name players. The squad were drawn mainly from the Malawian domestic league as well as the two tiers of top-flight football in South Africa. Marinica hit the ground running and wasted no time in diagnosing the flaws of the Flames and Malawian football in general." In his report, Marinica observed that "the players’ recruitment system is done ... haphazardly and very sentimentally. Physically, most players are short in key positions such as central defence and goalkeeping." Marinica then set about on his own scouting mission, which resulted in little-known players such as Civil Sporting Club defender Lawrence Chaziya, Silver Strikers midfielder Zebron Kalima and goalkeeper Charles Thomu getting call-ups. The Romanian also discarded the Flames’ short-pass game and asked his charges to adopt a more direct, fast-attacking football. In addition, he dismantled the starting 11 that had clinched the Afcon berth. The inexperienced players brought a positive work ethic and healthy competition in the squad. It became clear that there were no longer invincibles in the team, who displayed remarkable defensive discipline to hold Senegal. Back home, Malawians’ support of the Flames, ranked 129th in the world, grew with each game. Fans filled the streets on 14 January after the 2–1 win over Zimbabwe chanting "Siine koma Gabadinho", telling those who cared to listen that they cannot be faulted for the overnight celebrations because it was Mhango and his two goals that caused it. The Afcon has helped ignite a spark in Gabadinho Mhango, who has struggled at his club Orlando Pirates but shone in the Afcon for the Flames. "It is history in the making," Mhango said. "My ambition is to see Malawian players, including myself, playing overseas. At the end of the tournament, I can foresee four or five players playing in Europe. I have been telling my teammates that in every game we have to show a fighting spirit, whether we win or lose, because the whole world is watching. We need to prove that we have talent in Malawi."

On 1 April 2023, a statement released by the Football Association of Malawi announced that, "by mutual consent, it has been agreed with Mr Mario Marinica not to enter into negotiations for renewal of his contract when it expires on 30 April 2023." It also revealed that the 58-year-old will be "on scheduled annual leave" up until that date and thanked him for "bringing great joy and pride" to Malawi for their historic Afcon run in Cameroon.

=== Liberia ===
Marinica was appointed head coach of Liberia on 19 February 2024, on a two-year deal ahead of the start of their 2025 Nations Cup qualifying campaign.

Liberia remained unbeaten in his first four games, presiding over Liberia's record 10 places move up the FIFA rankings (from 152 to 142). Marinică became the first Lone Star manager in more than 20 years to avoid defeat in back-to-back competitive away matches. In October 2024, he stepped down as head coach of the national team.

=== Zimbabwe ===
On 4 November 2025, Marinică became the new head coach of the Zimbabwe national team, succeeding Michael Nees.

He resigned in April 2026.
