= 2016 Zimbabwe Premier Soccer League =

2016 Zimbabwe Premier League season

Zimbabwe Premier Soccer League
- Season: 2016
- Champions: CAPS United
- Relegated: Border Strikers; Chapungu United; Mutare City; Tsholotsho
- 2017 CAF Champions League: CAPS United
- Matches: 240
- Goals: 450 (1.88 per match)
- Top goalscorer: Leonard Tsipa (11)
- Biggest home win: 12 matches: Chicken Inn 3−0 Dynamos (2 April 2016); CAPS United 3−0 Chapungu United (3 April 2016); Harare City 4−1 Mutare City (8 April 2016); Harare City 4−1 Hwange (30 April 2016); Platinum 3−0 Border Strikers (21 May 2016); Tsholotsho 3-0 Hwange (16 July 2016); CAPS United 4-1 Mutare City (27 August 2016); Chapungu United 3-0 Border Strikers (27 August 2016); Mutare City 3-0 Border Strikers (15 October 2016); Ngezi Platinum 3-0 Hwange (29 October 2016); Platinum 3−0 Highlanders (20 November 2016); Highlanders 3-0 Hwange (26 November 2016)
- Biggest away win: 4 matches: Mutare City 0−3 Ngezi Platinum (2 April 2016); Hwange 0−3 Highlanders (3 April 2016); Ngezi Platinum 1−4 Highlanders (14 May 2016); Tsholotsho 0-3 Platinum (26 November 2016)
- Highest scoring: Hwange 5-3 Triangle United (28 August 2016)
- Longest winning run: Highlanders (7)
- Longest unbeaten run: Platinum (12)
- Longest winless run: Border Strikers (10)
- Longest losing run: Border Strikers (7)
- Average attendance: 441,608 spectators over 306 matches average 920 each.
- All statistics correct as of 26 November 2016.

The 2016 Zimbabwe Premier Soccer League is the 37th season of top-tier football in Zimbabwe. The season began on 1 April 2016 when How Mine took on newly promoted Bulawayo City at White City Stadium. CAPS United won their fifth league championship and first in 11 years.

== Attendances ==
Highlanders F.C. drew the highest average home attendance in the league in 2016, with an average attendance of 5,614. The previous year, they drew an average home attendance of 7,276 for domestic league games. The league's average attendance in 2016 was 920 (441,608 total attendance).

== Teams ==
A total of 16 teams are contesting the league, including 12 sides from the 2015 season and four promoted from the 2015 Zimbabwe Division 1, Border Strikers, Bulawayo City, Mutare City Rovers and Ngezi Platinum. On the other hand, Buffaloes, Dongo Sawmills, Flame Lilly and Wha Wha were the last four teams of the 2015 season and will play in the Zimbabwe Division 1 for the 2016 season. Chicken Inn are the defending champions from the 2015 season.

=== Stadiums and locations ===
Locations of the 2016 Zimbabwe Premier Soccer League teams

Team	Home city	Stadium	Capacity	2015 season
Border Strikers	Beitbridge	Dulivhadzimu Stadium	32,000	Zimbabwe Division 1
Bulawayo City	Bulawayo	Barbourfields Stadium		Zimbabwe Division 1
CAPS United	Harare	National Sports Stadium	60,000	5th in Premier League
Chapungu United	Gweru	Ascot Stadium	5,000	9th in Premier League
Chicken Inn	Bulawayo	Luveve Stadium	8,000	Premier League Champions
Dynamos	Harare	Rufaro Stadium	35,000	2nd in Premier League
Harare City	Harare	Rufaro Stadium	35,000	7th in Premier League
Highlanders	Bulawayo	Barbourfields Stadium	32,000	6th in Premier League
How Mine	Bulawayo	White City Stadium	20,000	11th in Premier League
Hwange Colliery	Hwange	Colliery Stadium	15,000	8th in Premier League
ZPC Kariba	Harare	Gwanzura	10,000	10th in Premier League
Mutare City Rovers	Mutare	Sakubva Stadium	20,000	Zimbabwe Division 1
Ngezi Platinum	Ngezi	Baobab Stadium	10,000	Zimbabwe Division 1
Platinum	Zvishavane	Mandava Stadium	3,000	3rd in Premier League
Triangle United	Chiredzi	Gibbo Stadium	3,000	4th in Premier League
Tsholotsho	Beitbridge	Dulivhadzimu Stadium	32,000	12th in Premier League

== Results ==
=== League table ===
Pos	Team	Pld	W	D	L	GF	GA	GD	Pts	Qualification or relegation
1	CAPS United (C, Q)	30	18	9	3	42	21	+21	63	2017 CAF Champions League
2	Platinum	30	17	10	3	38	15	+23	61	
3	Highlanders	30	17	5	8	41	24	+17	56	
4	Chicken Inn	30	13	8	9	31	20	+11	47	
5	Dynamos	30	12	10	8	29	24	+5	46	
6	Kariba	30	11	12	7	23	21	+2	45	
7	Ngezi Platinum	30	11	8	11	29	27	+2	41	
8	Bulawayo City	30	11	8	11	27	27	0	41	
9	Harare City	30	11	6	13	32	29	+3	39	
10	How Mine	30	9	12	9	27	25	+2	39	
11	Triangle United	30	10	8	12	27	32	−5	38	
12	Hwange	30	9	9	12	24	35	−11	36	
13	Chapungu United (R)	30	7	11	12	21	27	−6	32	Relegation to 2017 Zimbabwe Division 1
14	Tsholotsho (R)	30	7	5	18	23	37	−14	26	Relegation to 2017 Zimbabwe Division 1
15	Mutare City (R)	30	7	8	15	25	44	−19	26 (Note: Mutare City were docked 3 points for playing ineligible player Kudakwashe Gurure.)	Relegation to 2017 Zimbabwe Division 1
16	Border Strikers (R)	30	4	3	23	10	41	−31	15	Relegation to 2017 Zimbabwe Division 1

Updated to match(es) played on 26 November 2016. Source: FIFA.com
Rules for classification: 1) points; 2) goal difference; 3) goals scored; 4) head-to-head points; 5) head-to-head goal difference; 6) head-to-head goals scored; 7) head-to-head away goals
(C) Champions; (Q) Qualified for the phase indicated; (R) Relegated

=== Result table ===
All teams play in a double round robin system (home and away).

Home \ Away	BOR	BUL	CAP	CHA	CHI	DYN	HAR	HIG	HOW	HWA	KAR	MUT	NGE	PLA	TRI	TSH
Border Strikers		0–1	1–3	1–2	0–1	2–1	1–0	1–2	0–2	0–1	0–1	0–1	2–0	0–0	0–0	1–0
Bulawayo City	1–0		3–1	1–1	1–0	0–1	0–2	1–1	0–1	0–0	3–1	1–0	1–0	0–1	1–2	0–1
CAPS United	1–0	2–1		3–0	1–0	3–3	2–1	1–0	3–2	1–1	2–2	4–1	1–0	0–0	0–0	2–0
Chapungu United	3–0	0–0	0–1		2–1	1–2	2–1	0–1	2–2	2–0	0–1	2–0	1–1	0–2	1–0	1–1
Chicken Inn	1–0	0–1	1–2	0–0		3–0	2–0	2–0	0–0	1–0	2–0	2–0	0–0	0–1	1–2	1–0
Dynamos	2–0	1–1	0–1	1–0	2–3		2–1	0–2	0–0	1–1	0–0	2–0	2–0	0–1	0–0	2–0
Harare City	2–0	2–1	0–1	0–0	1–1	0–2		0–1	0–0	4–1	2–0	4–1	1–0	2–1	0–2	0–1
Highlanders	2–0	3–1	1–0	1–0	1–1	2–1	1–1		2–0	3–0	1–0	1–2	2–1	1–2	0–0	1–2
How Mine	1–1	2–2	2–1	1–1	0–1	0–0	1–0	0–2		2–0	2–0	0–0	1–2	0–0	2–0	1–2
Hwange	2–0	0–1	0–0	0–0	0–0	0–0	2–1	0–3	2–0		1–1	0–1	2–0	2–1	5–3	1–0
Kariba	2–0	1–1	0–0	0–0	1–0	0–0	0–1	1–0	0–0	1–0		2–0	0–0	1–1	1–0	1–0
Mutare City	3–0	0–1	0–2	0–0	1–3	1–2	2–2	0–0	1–0	2–1	0–0		0–3	1–2	2–0	3–3
Ngezi Platinum	1–0	1–0	1–1	2–0	2–1	0–0	1–2	1–4	0–2	3–0	1–0	2–0		0–1	3–1	1–1
Platinum	3–0	1–0	0–0	1–0	1–1	2–0	0–0	3–0	1–0	1–1	1–2	1–1	1–1		2–0	2–1
Triangle United	1–0	1–1	1–2	1–0	1–1	0–1	1–0	2–1	1–2	0–1	2–2	3–1	0–0	1–2		1–0
Tsholotsho	1–0	1–2	0–1	2–1	0–1	0–1	0–2	1–2	1–1	3–0	1–2	1–1	0–2	0–3	0–1	

Updated to match(es) played on 26 November 2016. Source: soccerway.com
Legend: Blue = home team win; Yellow = draw; Red = away team win.

== Positions by round ==
Leader
Relegation to Zimbabwe Division 1

Team ╲ Round	1	2	3	4	5	6	7	8	9	10	11	12	13	14	15	16	17	18	19	20	21	22	23	24	25	26	27	28	29	30
CAPS United	1	3	2	2	1	3	3	3	2	1	2	3	3	1	3	2	2	2	2	2	2	2	2	2	2	1	1	1	1	1
Platinum	6	2	1	1	2	1	1	1	1	4	3	2	1	3	2	1	1	1	1	1	1	1	1	1	1	2	3	2	2	2
Highlanders	1	7	5	4	3	2	2	2	4	3	1	1	2	2	1	3	3	3	3	3	3	3	3	3	3	3	2	3	3	3
Chicken Inn	1	1	3	5	9	8	7	8	10	11	10	7	7	9	10	7	10	10	11	9	8	7	7	6	6	7	6	5	5	4
Dynamos	13	13	9	12	12	15	12	12	9	8	5	5	4	4	4	4	4	4	6	4	5	5	5	4	5	5	5	4	4	5
Kariba	5	9	8	6	5	5	4	4	3	2	4	4	5	5	5	5	6	7	5	4	4	4	4	5	4	4	4	6	6	6
Ngezi Platinum	1	4	7	9	8	10	11	11	12	13	13	12	9	10	7	8	5	6	9	11	12	12	10	7	9	9	9	8	9	7
Bulawayo City	8	12	14	13	10	9	10	7	6	7	9	11	8	7	9	12	9	9	10	8	10	8	8	11	10	8	10	9	7	8
Harare City	11	7	10	8	7	7	9	10	8	6	7	8	10	8	8	10	8	11	8	10	7	6	6	9	7	6	7	7	8	9
How Mine	9	5	6	3	4	4	6	6	7	9	8	10	11	12	11	11	13	8	7	7	9	10	12	10	11	11	8	10	10	10
Triangle United	7	6	4	7	6	6	5	5	5	5	6	6	6	6	6	6	7	5	4	6	6	9	11	8	8	10	12	11	12	11
Hwange	13	15	13	14	15	12	8	9	11	10	11	9	13	11	13	9	12	13	12	13	13	13	13	13	13	12	11	12	11	12
Chapungu United	13	11	12	11	14	14	14	13	14	12	12	13	12	13	12	13	11	12	13	12	11	11	9	12	12	13	13	13	13	13
Tsholotsho	10	9	11	10	13	11	13	14	13	14	15	15	15	15	14	14	15	15	15	15	15	15	15	15	15	15	15	15	15	14
Mutare City	13	16	16	14	11	13	15	15	15	15	14	14	14	14	15	15	14	14	14	14	14	14	14	14	14	14	14	14	14	15
Border Strikers	12	14	15	16	16	16	16	16	16	16	16	16	16	16	16	16	16	16	16	16	16	16	16	16	16	16	16	16	16	16

Updated to match(es) played on 26 November 2016. Source: Soccerway

== Season statistics ==
=== Goals ===
==== Top scorers ====
As of 26 November 2016

Rank	Player	Team	Goals
1	(Zimbabwe) Leonard Tsipa	CAPS United	11
2	(Zimbabwe) Gift Mbweti	Hwange	9
2	(Zimbabwe) Walter Musona	Platinum	9
4	(Zimbabwe) Obadiah Tarumbwa	Chicken Inn	8
5	(Zimbabwe) Kuda Gurure	Mutare City	7
5	(Zimbabwe) Bruce Kangwa	Highlanders	7
5	(Zimbabwe) Agrippa Murimba	Mutare City	7
5	(Zimbabwe) Simba Nhivi	CAPS United	7
9	(Zimbabwe) Masimba Mambare	Dynamos	6
10	(Zimbabwe) Rodwell Chinyengetere	Platinum	5
10	(Zimbabwe) Dominic Chungwa	CAPS United	5
10	(Zimbabwe) Prince Dube	Highlanders	5
10	(Zimbabwe) William Manondo	Harare City	5
10	(Zimbabwe) Raphael Manuvire	Harare City	5
10	(Zimbabwe) Marvelous Mukumba	Triangle United	5
10	(Zimbabwe) Simon Munawa	Highlanders	5
10	(Denmark) James Nguluve	Ngezi Platinum	5
10	(Zimbabwe) Donald Tegure	Ngezi Platinum	5
10	(Zimbabwe) Gilbert Zulu	Hwange	5

=== Scoring ===
- First goal of the season: Pascal Manhanga for How Mine against Bulawayo City (3 April 2016)
