= Madzongwe =

Madzongwe is a surname. Notable people with the surname include:

- Edna Madzongwe, Zimbabwean politician
- Kelvin Madzongwe, Zimbabwean footballer
