= Gomezgani Chirwa =

Malawian footballer

Personal information
- Date of birth: 25 September 1996 (age 30)
- Place of birth: Mponela, Malawi
- Height: 1.64 m (5 ft 5 in)
- Position: Full-back

Team information
- Current team: Ngezi Platinum

Senior career*
Years	Team	Apps	(Gls)
2016–2018	Civil Service United		
2019–2024	Nyasa Big Bullets		
2025–	Ngezi Platinum		

International career^{‡}
2017–	Malawi	30	(0)
- * Club domestic league appearances and goals as of 03:18, 16 January 2026 (UTC) ‡ National team caps and goals as of 03:18, 16 January 2026 (UTC)

Gomezgani Chirwa (born 25 September 1996) is a Malawian professional footballer who plays as a full-back for Ngezi Platinum and the Malawi national team.

== Club career ==
Chirwe signed for Zimbabwean club Ngezi Platinum in 2025.

== International career ==
He was included in Malawi's squad for the 2021 Africa Cup of Nations.
