= Francisco Madinga =

Malawian football player (born 2000)

Personal information
- Date of birth: 11 February 2000 (age 26)
- Place of birth: Lilongwe, Malawi
- Height: 1.66 m (5 ft 5 in)
- Position: Midfielder

Team information
- Current team: Mighty Wanderers

Senior career*
Years	Team	Apps	(Gls)
2019	Mighty Wanderers		
2020–2022	Dila Gori	55	(5)
2023	Jwaneng Galaxy		
2023–	Mighty Wanderers		

International career^{‡}
2021–	Malawi	7	(0)
- * Club domestic league appearances and goals as of 3 December 2022 ‡ National team caps and goals as of 15:30, 4 January 2022 (UTC)

Francisco Madinga (born 11 February 2000) is a Malawian footballer who plays as a midfielder for Mighty Wanderers. He was included in Malawi's squad for the 2021 Africa Cup of Nations.

== International career ==
He made his debut for Malawi national football team on 24 March 2021 in an AFCON 2021 qualifier against South Sudan.
