= Petros Mhari =

Zimbabwean footballer (born 1989)

Personal information
- Date of birth: 15 April 1989 (age 37)
- Place of birth: Filabusi, Zimbabwe
- Height: 1.75 m (5 ft 9 in)
- Position: Goalkeeper

Team information
- Current team: F.C. Platinum
- Number: 1

Senior career*
Years	Team	Apps	(Gls)
2004–2009	Shabanie Mine		
2009–2013	Hwange Colliery		
2013–	F.C. Platinum		

International career^{‡}
2021–	Zimbabwe	5	(0)
- * Club domestic league appearances and goals as of 18:26, 9 January 2022 (UTC) ‡ National team caps and goals as of 18:26, 9 January 2022 (UTC)

Petros Mhari (born 15 April 1989) is a Zimbabwean professional footballer who plays as a goalkeeper for the Zimbabwean club F.C. Platinum and the Zimbabwe national team.2016 Goalkeeper of the season 2nd runner up soccer stars

== Club career ==
Mhari went to a sports school in Shangani Secondary school, and originally played as a midfielder. He was forced to play handball in school due to a shortage of interested students, but from there learned skills that translated to the goalkeeper position in football. He began his senior career as a goalkeeper with Shabanie Mine, before moving to Hwange Colliery in 2009. In 2013, he moved to F.C. Platinum where he helped his side win three consecutive Zimbabwe Premier Soccer League titles from 2017 to 2019.

== International career ==
Mhari made his international debut with the Zimbabwe national team in a 1–0 2022 FIFA World Cup qualification loss to South Africa on 11 November 2021. He was part of the Zimbabwe squad the 2021 Africa Cup of Nations.

== Honours ==
F.C. Platinum

- Cup of Zimbabwe: 2014
- Zimbabwe Premier Soccer League: 2017, 2018, 2019
