= Simba Nhivi =

Zimbabwean footballer (born 1991)

Personal information
- Full name: Simbarashe Nhivi Sithole
- Date of birth: 10 January 1991 (age 35)
- Place of birth: Masvingo, Zimbabwe
- Position: Striker

Team information
- Current team: Dynamos
- Number: 19

Senior career*
| Years | Team | Apps | (Gls) |
| 2011 | Shooting Stars | | |
| 2011 | CAPS United | 11 | (10) |
| 2011–2012 | Mamelodi Sundowns | 0 | (0) |
| 2012–2013 | Dynamos | | |
| 2013 | SuperSport United | 5 | (0) |
| 2013 | Dynamos | | |
| 2013–2014 | Ajax Cape Town | 6 | (0) |
| 2014–2015 | Dynamos | | |
| 2016–2017 | CAPS United | | |
| 2017–2018 | Singida United | | |
| 2018 | Ngezi Platinum | | |
| 2018 | CAPS United | | |
| 2019– | Dynamos | | |

International career^{‡}
| 2013–2014 | Zimbabwe | 10 | (1) |
- * Club domestic league appearances and goals as of 14 November 2020 ‡ National team caps and goals as of 14 November 2020

Simbarashe "Simba" Nhivi Sithole (born 10 January 1991), commonly known as Simba Nhivi, is a Zimbabwean professional footballer who plays as a striker for Zimbabwe Premier Soccer League side Dynamos and the Zimbabwe national team.

== Club career ==
Nhivi's career started in Zimbabwe with Shooting Stars, he left Shooting Stars in 2011 to join CAPS United. His move to CAPS Utd led to a transfer outside his homeland for the first time as he agreed to join Premier Soccer League side Mamelodi Sundowns. However, Nhivi's spell with the Sundowns was unsuccessful as he left in 2012 without making a single appearance. His next move was back to Zimbabwe to join Dynamos, a year later he left for South Africa again but this time joined SuperSport United. He made five league appearances for SuperSport Utd before rejoining Dynamos soon after.

== International career ==
Nhivi has won 10 caps for the Zimbabwe national team and scored one goal for his nation, which came versus Mozambique in 2013.

== Career statistics ==
As of 26 June 2016

Appearances and goals by national team and year
| National team | Year | Apps | Goals |
|---|---|---|---|
| Zimbabwe | 2013 | 4 | 1 |
| Zimbabwe | 2014 | 6 | 0 |
| Total | | 10 | 1 |

Score and result list Zimbabwe's goal tally first, score column indicates score after Nhivi goal.

International goal scored by Simba Nhivi
| No. | Date | Venue | Opponent | Score | Result | Competition |
|---|---|---|---|---|---|---|
| 1 | 8 December 2013 | Barbourfields Stadium, Bulawayo, Zimbabwe | Mozambique | 1–0 | 2–1 | Friendly |

== Honours ==
Dynamos

- Zimbabwe Premier Soccer League: 2012, 2013, 2014

CAPS United

- Zimbabwe Premier Soccer League: 2016
