= Chikoti Chirwa =

Malawian footballer

Personal information
- Date of birth: 9 March 1992 (age 34)
- Place of birth: Mzuzu, Malawi
- Height: 1.79 m (5 ft 10 in)
- Position: Defensive midfielder

Team information
- Current team: Red Lions

Senior career*
Years	Team	Apps	(Gls)
2012–2018	Red Lions		
2019	Kamuzu Barracks		
2020–	Red Lions		

International career^{‡}
2015–	Malawi	26	(2)
- * Club domestic league appearances and goals as of 19:43, 8 January 2022 (UTC) ‡ National team caps and goals as of 19:43, 8 January 2022 (UTC)

Chikoti Chirwa (born 9 March 1992) is a Malawian footballer who plays as a defensive midfielder for Red Lions and the Malawi national team. He was included in Malawi's squad for the 2021 Africa Cup of Nations.
