= Kudakwashe Mahachi =

Zimbabwean footballer (born 1993)

Personal information
- Full name: Kudakwashe Mahachi
- Date of birth: 29 September 1993 (age 33)
- Place of birth: Bulawayo, Zimbabwe
- Height: 1.69 m (5 ft 7 in)
- Position: Midfielder Left-back

Youth career
- Highlanders

Senior career*
| Years | Team | Apps | (Gls) |
| 2012 | Bantu Rovers | | |
| 2012–2014 | Chicken Inn | | |
| 2014 | Highlanders | | |
| 2014–2016 | Mamelodi Sundowns | 13 | (1) |
| 2015–2016 | → Golden Arrows (loan) | 21 | (3) |
| 2016–2018 | Golden Arrows | 46 | (7) |
| 2018–2019 | Orlando Pirates | 11 | (3) |
| 2019–2022 | SuperSport United | 62 | (6) |
| 2023-2024 | Medeama | | (1) |
| 2024-2025 | Manica Diamonds | | |
| 2026- | Highlanders | 28 | |

International career^{‡}
| 2013– | Zimbabwe | 44 | (5) |
- * Club domestic league appearances and goals as of 18 January 2022 ‡ National team caps and goals as of 16 November 2023

Kudakwashe 'Nkembe' Mahachi (born 29 September 1993) is a Zimbabwean professional footballer, who played as a midfielder for South African clubs and the Zimbabwe national team.

== Club Career ==
Bantu Rovers

Mahachi spent the end of his youth career with Highlanders, before moving into senior football with Bantu Rovers.

Chicken Inn FC

Mahachi did not stay long with the youthful Rovers as he soon joined Chicken Inn. For two years he led the Chicken Inn attack along prominent players like Tendai Ndoro. In 2014 he signed a senior team contract with Highlanders.

Mamelodi Sundowns

After another short stint, his next move saw him leave Zimbabwe for the first time as he joined Premier Soccer League side Mamelodi Sundowns in South Africa. 14 appearances and 1 goal followed in his debut season with 'The Brazilians'.

Lamontville Golden Arrows (Loan)

In his second campaign he was loaned out to fellow PSL club Golden Arrows. He scored four goals in twenty-five appearances in all competitions for Golden Arrows before returning to the Sundowns. He missed Golden Arrows' league match versus Jomo Cosmos on 11 May 2016 due to the passing of his daughter.

Lamontville Golden Arrows

In 2016 Mahachi made a permanent move to 'Abafana bes'thende'. This was to be his home for 2 seasons in which he appeared 46 times and scored 7 goals.

Orlando Pirates

Mahachi's next big move was to Soweto giants Orlando Pirates. While in their ranks he scored 3 goals in 11 appearances.

Supersport United

In 2019, Mahachi left 'The Buccaneers' to join Supersport. Between 2019 and 2022 he appeared 62 times and scored 6 goals.

Medeama SC

In 2023 Kudakwashe Mahachi had a 5 month stint with Ghananian top flight league team Medeama.

Manica Diamonds

After his short stay in Ghana he signed for Zimbabwean club Manica Diamonds where he played for two seasons.

Highlanders

Ahead of the 2026 Zimbabwe Premier Soccer League season, Mahachi signed a one year contract with Bulawayo giants Highlanders. This marked a return to his boyhood club after 12 years, most of which were spent plying his trade in South Africa. In his new spell at Highlanders, Mahachi who is known for his pace and skill as a winger has played mostly as a left-back.

=== International ===
In January 2014, coach Ian Gorowa, invited Mahachi to be a part of the Zimbabwe squad for the 2014 African Nations Championship. He helped the team to a fourth-place finish after being defeated by Nigeria by a goal to nil. Mahachi scored his first goal for his nation in the aforementioned 2014 African Nations Championship and his second in a friendly versus Malawi.

== Style of play ==
In most cases, Mahachi tends to be a winger playing on either side of the field using his acceleration and left-footed passes to attack the defensive line. Although he is well-known for his dribbling and ball controlling skills, his tactical position was changed in Highlanders where he played as a Left-back.

== Career statistics ==
=== Club ===
As of match played 23 June 2016.

Statistics
| Club | Season | League | | | National Cup (Note: Includes the Nedbank Cup) | | League Cup (Note: Includes the Telkom Knockout) | | Continental (Note: Includes the CAF Champions League) | | Other (Note: Includes the MTN 8) | | Total | |
| Club | Season | Division | Apps | Goals | Apps | Goals | Apps | Goals | Apps | Goals | Apps | Goals | Apps | Goals |
|---|---|---|---|---|---|---|---|---|---|---|---|---|---|---|
| Mamelodi Sundowns | 2014–15 | Premier Soccer League | 13 | 1 | 1 | 0 | 0 | 0 | 0 | 0 | 0 | 0 | 14 | 1 |
| Mamelodi Sundowns | 2015–16 | Premier Soccer League | 0 | 0 | 0 | 0 | 0 | 0 | 0 | 0 | 0 | 0 | 0 | 0 |
| Mamelodi Sundowns | Total | | 13 | 1 | 1 | 0 | 0 | 0 | 0 | 0 | 0 | 0 | 14 | 1 |
| Golden Arrows (loan) | 2015–16 | Premier Soccer League | 21 | 3 | 2 | 1 | 2 | 0 | — | | 0 | 0 | 25 | 4 |
| Golden Arrows (loan) | Total | | 21 | 3 | 2 | 1 | 2 | 0 | — | | 0 | 0 | 25 | 4 |
| Career total | | | 34 | 4 | 3 | 1 | 2 | 0 | 0 | 0 | 0 | 0 | 39 | 5 |

=== International ===
As of match played 18 January 2022.

| National team | Year | Apps | Goals |
|---|---|---|---|
| Zimbabwe | 2013 | 2 | 0 |
| Zimbabwe | 2014 | 9 | 2 |
| Zimbabwe | 2015 | 2 | 0 |
| Zimbabwe | 2016 | 4 | 0 |
| Zimbabwe | 2017 | 7 | 1 |
| Zimbabwe | 2018 | 1 | 0 |
| Zimbabwe | 2019 | 6 | 0 |
| Zimbabwe | 2020 | 2 | 0 |
| Zimbabwe | 2021 | 8 | 1 |
| Zimbabwe | 2022 | 3 | 1 |
| Total | | 44 | 5 |

==== International goals ====
As of match played 18 January 2022. Scores and results list Zimbabwe's goal tally first.

| No. | Date | Venue | Opponent | Score | Result | Competition |
|---|---|---|---|---|---|---|
| 1 | 25 January 2014 | Cape Town Stadium, Cape Town, South Africa | Mali | 2–0 | 2–1 | 2014 African Nations Championship |
| 2 | 5 March 2014 | Kamuzu Stadium, Blantyre, Malawi | Malawi | 2–1 | 4–1 | Friendly |
| 3 | 15 January 2017 | Stade de Franceville, Franceville, Gabon | Algeria | 1–1 | 2–2 | 2017 Africa Cup of Nations |
| 4 | 14 November 2021 | National Sports Stadium, Harare, Zimbabwe | Ethiopia | 1–0 | 1–1 | 2022 FIFA World Cup qualification |
| 5 | 18 January 2022 | Stade Ahmadou Ahidjo, Yaoundé, Cameroon | Guinea | 2–0 | 2–1 | 2021 Africa Cup of Nations |

== Honours ==
Chicken Inn

- Zimbabwean Charity Shield: 2013
