= Takudzwa Chimwemwe =

Zimbabwean footballer (born 1992)

Takudza Chimwemwe
Personal information
- Full name: Gilroy Takudzwa Chimwemwe
- Date of birth: 26 October 1992 (age 34)
- Place of birth: Harare, Zimbabwe
- Height: 1.60 m (5 ft 3 in)
- Position: Right back

Team information
- Current team: Nkana

Senior career*
Years	Team	Apps	(Gls)
2013	Twalumba		(18)
2014–2019	Harare City		
2020–2021	Buildcon		
2021–2023	Nkana		
2023–	TP Mazembe	7	(0)

International career^{‡}
2014	Zimbabwe U23		
2020–	Zimbabwe	7	(0)
- * Club domestic league appearances and goals as of 11:06, 4 January 2022 (UTC) ‡ National team caps and goals as of 11:06, 4 January 2022 (UTC)

Gilroy Takudzwa Chimwemwe (born 26 October 1992) is a Zimbabwean footballer who plays as a right back for TP Mazembe and the Zimbabwe national team.

== Club career ==
Born in Harare, Chimwemwe grew up in Dsivaresekwa before earning a scholarship to Pamushana High School in Masvingo Province. He started his career at Twalumba, where he scored 18 goals in the 2013 ZIFA Northern Region Division One.

Subsequently, he signed for Zimbabwe Premier Soccer League club Harare City in February 2014. He was signed as a central midfielder but made his full debut for the club at right back due to an injury crisis at the club, which led to Chimwemwe adopting the right back role permanently.

He moved to Zambia Super League club Buildcon in January 2020. He transferred to fellow Zambian club Nkana on 30 January 2021, alongside fellow Zimbabwean player Kelvin Moyo.

== International career ==
Chimwemwe was called up to the Zimbabwe national under-23 team for the first time in November 2014 for a fixture against Morocco, which he played in.

He was also called up to the Zimbabwe national team for a fixture against Malawi in October 2020, which was drawn 0–0 with Chimwemwe playing the full 90 minutes. He played in two matches of the 2021 Africa Cup of Nations qualification, from which Zimbabwe qualified. He was named in Zimbabwe's squad for the tournament, which will be held in January and February 2022.
