= Kelvin Madzongwe =

Zimbabwean footballer (born 1990)

Personal information
- Full name: Kelvin Wilbert Madzongwe
- Date of birth: 5 January 1990 (age 36)
- Place of birth: Magwegwe, Zimbabwe
- Height: 1.88 m (6 ft 2 in)
- Position: Defensive midfielder

Team information
- Current team: F.C. Platinum
- Number: 4

College career
Years	Team	Apps	(Gls)
2010–2014	Boston U Terriers	62	(2)

Senior career*
Years	Team	Apps	(Gls)
2007–2008	Bulawayo Chiefs		
2008–2009	Njube Sundowns		
2009–2010	Chicken Inn		
2016–2018	Bulawayo City		
2018–	F.C. Platinum		

International career^{‡}
2019–	Zimbabwe	7	(0)
- * Club domestic league appearances and goals as of 18:26, 9 January 2022 (UTC) ‡ National team caps and goals as of 18:26, 9 January 2022 (UTC)

Kelvin Wilbert Madzongwe (born 5 January 1990) is a Zimbabwean professional footballer who plays as a defensive midfielder for the Zimbabwean club F.C. Platinum, and the Zimbabwe national team.

== Club career ==
Madzongwe began his career as a footballer in Zimbabwe with Bulawayo Chiefs, Njube Sundowns and Chicken Inn. He was scouted by the Boston University Terriers, and from 2010 to 2014 studied Communications and Marketing relations at Boston University while playing for their university side. He returned to Zimbabwe to continue his football career, where he played for Bulawayo City and F.C. Platinum.

== International career ==
Takwara made his international debut with the Zimbabwe national team in a 3–1 2020 African Nations Championship qualification win over Mauritius on 4 August 2019. He was part of the Zimbabwe squad the 2021 Africa Cup of Nations.

== Honours ==
F.C. Platinum

- Zimbabwe Premier Soccer League: 2018, 2019
