= Gabadinho Mhango =

Malawian footballer

Personal information
- Full name: Hellings Frank Mhango
- Date of birth: 27 September 1992 (age 34)
- Place of birth: Chiweta, Malawi
- Height: 1.62 m (5 ft 4 in)
- Position: Striker

Team information
- Current team: Richards Bay
- Number: 7

Youth career
- Brave Warriors

Senior career*
Years	Team	Apps	(Gls)
2012–2013	Big Bullets		
2013–2015	Bloemfontein Celtic	46	(15)
2015–2016	Lamontville Golden Arrows	13	(5)
2016–2019	Bidvest Wits	52	(14)
2019–2022	Orlando Pirates	55	(21)
2022–2023	AmaZulu	16	(4)
2023–2024	Moroka Swallows	24	(7)
2024–2025	Marumo Gallants	20	(5)
2025–	Richards Bay	14	(4)

International career^{‡}
2012–	Malawi	74	(20)
- * Club domestic league appearances and goals as of 14:50, 4 January 2026 (UTC) ‡ National team caps and goals as of 14:50, 4 January 2026 (UTC)

Hellings Frank "Gabadinho" Mhango (born 27 September 1992) is a Malawian professional footballer who plays as a striker for Richards Bay and the Malawi national team.

== Club career ==
Mhango has played club football for Brave Warriors, Big Bullets, Bloemfontein Celtic, Lamontville Golden Arrows and Bidvest Wits.

In June 2019, he signed for Orlando Pirates.

He moved to AmaZulu in June 2022. He then played for Moroka Swallows, Marumo Gallants, and Richards Bay.

== International career ==
He made his international debut for Malawi in 2012. In September 2012, Mhango was called to the Malawi squad for the forthcoming Africa Cup of Nations qualifying match against Ghana. In May 2013, it was announced that he would be unavailable for two forthcoming World Cup qualifying matches due to his school exams. Mhango scored twice in Malawi's first 2015 Africa Cup of Nations qualifying match against Chad on 17 May 2014.

Mhango's goal during the 2021 African Cup of Nations against Morocco made it to the top three of CAF Awards for the goal of the tournament.

=== International goals ===
As of match played 5 September 2025. Malawi score listed first, score column indicates score after each Mhango goal.

International goals by date, venue, cap, opponent, score, result and competition
No.	Date	Venue	Opponent	Score	Result	Competition
1	23 March 2013	Sam Nujoma Stadium, Windhoek, Namibia	Namibia	1–0	1–0	2014 FIFA World Cup qualification
2	17 May 2014	Kamuzu Stadium, Blantyre, Malawi	Chad	1–0	2–0	2015 Africa Cup of Nations qualification
3	17 May 2014	Kamuzu Stadium, Blantyre, Malawi	Chad	2–0	2–0	2015 Africa Cup of Nations qualification
4	31 May 2014	Stade Omnisports Idriss Mahamat Ouya, N'Djamena, Chad	Chad	1–3	1–3	2015 Africa Cup of Nations qualification
5	12 June 2016	Independence Stadium, Windhoek, Namibia	Angola	1–0	3–0	2016 COSAFA Cup
6	12 June 2016	Independence Stadium, Windhoek, Namibia	Angola	2–0	3–0	2016 COSAFA Cup
7	12 June 2016	Independence Stadium, Windhoek, Namibia	Angola	3–0	3–0	2016 COSAFA Cup
8	26 May 2019	King Zwelithini Stadium, Umlazi, South Africa	Seychelles	1–0	3–0	2019 COSAFA Cup
9	28 May 2019	King Zwelithini Stadium, Umlazi, South Africa	Namibia	1–1	2–1	2019 COSAFA Cup
10	2 June 2019	Princess Magogo Stadium, KwaMashu, South Africa	Zambia	1–0	2–2 (2–4 p)	2019 COSAFA Cup
11	13 November 2019	Kamuzu Stadium, Blantyre, Malawi	South Sudan	1–0	1–0	2021 Africa Cup of Nations qualification
12	31 December 2021	Prince Abdullah Al Faisal Stadium, Jeddah, Saudi Arabia	Comoros	1–0	2–1	Friendly
13	14 January 2022	Kouekong Stadium, Bafoussam, Cameroon	Zimbabwe	1–1	2–1	2021 Africa Cup of Nations
14	14 January 2022	Kouekong Stadium, Bafoussam, Cameroon	Zimbabwe	2–1	2–1	2021 Africa Cup of Nations
15	25 January 2022	Ahmadou Ahidjo Stadium, Yaoundé, Cameroon	Morocco	1–0	1–2	2021 Africa Cup of Nations
16	5 June 2024	Bingu National Stadium, Lilongwe, Malawi	Ethiopia	1–0	2–1	2023 Africa Cup of Nations qualification
17	5 June 2024	Bingu National Stadium, Lilongwe, Malawi	Ethiopia	2–0	2–1	2023 Africa Cup of Nations qualification
18	18 November 2024	Bingu National Stadium, Lilongwe, Malawi	Burkina Faso	1–0	3–0	2025 Africa Cup of Nations qualification
19	5 September 2025	Obed Itani Chilume Stadium, Francistown, Botswana	Namibia	2–0	2–1	2026 FIFA World Cup qualification
20	8 September 2025	Bingu National Stadium, Lilongwe, Malawi	Liberia	1–2	2–2	2026 FIFA World Cup qualification
