= Dennis Chembezi =

Malawian footballer (born 1997)

Personal information
- Date of birth: 15 January 1997 (age 29)
- Place of birth: Zomba, Malawi
- Height: 1.65 m (5 ft 5 in)
- Position: Centre-back

Senior career*
Years	Team	Apps	(Gls)
2016	Mighty Wanderers		
2017	Wizards		
2018–2019	Mighty Wanderers		
2019–2022	Polokwane City	32	(1)
2022–2023	Black Leopards	12	(0)
2023–2026	Al-Qasim		

International career^{‡}
2017–	Malawi	48	(0)
- * Club domestic league appearances and goals as of 11 July 2026 ‡ National team caps and goals as of 13 July 2024

Dennis Chembezi (born 15 January 1997) is a Malawian professional footballer who plays as a centre-back for the Malawi national team.
