= Gift Mbweti =

Zimbabwean footballer (born 1991)

Personal information
- Date of birth: 6 October 1991 (age 35)
- Height: 1.70 m (5 ft 7 in)
- Position: Striker

Team information
- Current team: Platinum

Senior career*
Years	Team	Apps	(Gls)
2010	Kujatana		
2011–2014	Technosphere		
2015–2016	Hwange		
2017–2024	Platinum		

International career^{‡}
2016	Zimbabwe	1	(0)
- * Club domestic league appearances and goals as of 14 November 2020 ‡ National team caps and goals as of 14 November 2020

Gift Mbweti (born 6 October 1991) is a Zimbabwean football striker who currently plays for Platinum.
