= Peter Muduhwa =

Zimbabwean footballer (born 1993)

Personal information
- Date of birth: 11 August 1993 (age 33)
- Place of birth: Bulawayo, Zimbabwe
- Position: Defender

Team information
- Current team: Scottland

Senior career*
Years	Team	Apps	(Gls)
2014–2015	Ajax Hotspurs Mpopoma		
2015 2015 Highlanders loaned to Bulawayo Chiefs(6Months)	Bulawayo Chiefs		
2015–2024	Highlanders		
2021	→ Simba (loan)		
2025-	Scottland		

International career
2017–	Zimbabwe	6	(0)
- * Club domestic league appearances and goals

Peter Muduhwa (born 11 August 1993) is a Zimbabwean professional footballer who plays as a defender for Scottland FC and the Zimbabwe national football team.

== Career ==
Club

After nearly a decade at Bulawayo giants Highlanders Football Club, Muduhwa saw out his contract and from 2025 signed for emerging Harare giants Scottland He went on to help them win the Premier League title in his first season at the club.

=== International ===
Muduhwa made his senior international debut on 26 March 2017 in a 0–0 friendly draw against Zambia. While contracted with the Highlanders, Peter Muduhwa joined Tanzanian club Simba SC on a six-month loan.
