= Talbert Shumba =

Zimbabwean footballer (born 1990)

Personal information
- Full name: Talbert Tanunurwa Shumba
- Date of birth: 12 May 1990 (age 36)
- Place of birth: Bulawayo, Zimbabwe
- Position: Goalkeeper

Team information
- Current team: [SCOTLAND FC

Senior career*
Years	Team	Apps	(Gls)
2010–2012	Dynamos Harare		
2012–2015	F.C. Platinum		
2015–	Chapungu United		

International career^{‡}
2019–	Zimbabwe	2	(0)
- * Club domestic league appearances and goals ‡ National team caps and goals as of 29 September 2019

Talbert Tanunurwa Shumba (born 12 May 1990) is a Zimbabwean footballer who plays as a goalkeeper for Chapungu United F.C. and the Zimbabwe national football team.

== Career ==
=== International ===
Shumba was included in Zimbabwe's squad for both the 2017 and 2018 COSAFA Cup tournaments, but did not feature in any of their matches either year. He was included in Zimbabwe's squad for the 2019 COSAFA Cup as well. Shumba made his senior international debut on 7 June 2019, coming on as a 64th-minute substitute for Elvis Chipezeze in a 2–2 draw with Lesotho at the 2019 COSAFA Cup. Zimbabwe won the match 5–4 on penalties, with Shumba denying Tshwarelo Bereng from the spot.
