= Ishmael Wadi =

Zimbabwean footballer (born 1992)

Personal information
- Date of birth: 19 December 1992 (age 33)
- Position: Forward

Team information
- Current team: Caps United FC

Senior career*
Years	Team	Apps	(Gls)
2015	Bulawayo City		
2016–2017	FC Platinum		
2017–2018	Bulawayo City		
2019	Harare City		
2020–2021	CAPS United		
2021–	JDR Stars	78	(26)

International career^{‡}
2021–	Zimbabwe	6	(1)
- * Club domestic league appearances and goals as of 21:56, 26 June 2024 (UTC) ‡ National team caps and goals as of 20:03, 14 January 2022 (UTC)

Ishmael Wadi (born 19 December 1992) is a Zimbabwean professional footballer who plays as a forward for Caps united and the Zimbabwe national team.

== International career ==
He was named in Zimbabwe's squad for the 2021 Africa Cup of Nations.

On 11 December 2025, Wadi was called up to the Zimbabwe squad for the 2025 Africa Cup of Nations.
