= Border Strikers F.C. =

Zimbabwean football club

Border Strikers FC
- Full name: Border Strikers Football Club
- Nickname(s): Vavheneki
- Founded: 1982
- Ground: Dulivhadzimu Stadium in Beitbridge
Home colours

Border Strikers FC is a Zimbabwean football club based in Beitbridge.

The club was refounded in 2014 after they were expelled from the second division in 2012 for failing to fulfill their matches.

Border Strikers F.C were champions of the Central Region Division One in 2015, earning them promotion to the Zimbabwean top flight. Their promotion was made more remarkable by the fact it was their first season in the second division. However they were relegated in their first season in the Premier Soccer League.

The club were expelled from the second division in 2017 for failure to pay the league affiliation fee.

== Stadium ==
Currently the team plays at the Dulivhadzimu Stadium in Beitbridge. They played several matches at Maglas Stadium in Zvishavane in 2016 until Dulivhadzimu Stadium was accepted by the Zimbabwe FA.

== Current squad ==
Note: Flags indicate national team as defined under FIFA eligibility rules; some limited exceptions apply. Players may hold more than one non-FIFA nationality.

| No. | Pos. | Nation | Player |
|---|---|---|---|
| 3 | | | Michael Mwanya |
| 6 | | | Shingirai Nopi |
| 7 | | | Saul Chaminuka Jr. |
| 8 | | | Clever Mutendebvure |
| 10 | | | David Tendai Tito |
| 11 | | | Junildy Borges |
| 12 | | | Tembwe Kalunga |
| 13 | | | Shephard Kaurimbo |
| 14 | | | George Tapiwa Chamboko |
| 18 | | | Kudzanai Kwashi |
| 19 | GK | | Gilbert Chigwandaza |

| No. | Pos. | Nation | Player |
|---|---|---|---|
| 21 | | | Ephraim Mwinga |
| 24 | | | Hughe Chikosa |
| 25 | | (Zimbabwe) ZIM | Farai Masusunye |
| 28 | | (Zimbabwe) ZIM | Livingstone Genti |
| 30 | | (Zimbabwe) ZIM | Prince Sibanda |
| 32 | | | Michael Variso |
| 33 | DF | | Godfrey Mukambi |
| 41 | | | Shelton Mazumba |
| 43 | | | Talent Sande |
| 48 | | | Munyaradzi Chirape |
