= Meke Mwase =

Malawian football coach and player

Personal information
- Date of birth: 6 July 1972 (age 54)
- Position: Defender

Team information
- Current team: Malawi (manager)

Senior career*
Years	Team	Apps	(Gls)
1996	Jomo Cosmos		
1996–1998	Michau Warriors		
1998–2002	Big Bullets		

International career
1991–2001	Malawi	77	(2)

Managerial career
- 2019: Malawi (interim)
- 2019–2021: Malawi
- * Club domestic league appearances and goals

Meke Mwase (born 6 July 1972) is a Malawian football coach and former player.

== Playing career ==
Mwase played as a defender for Jomo Cosmos, Michau Warriors and Big Bullets, as well as the Malawi national team.

In April 2019, he was appointed as caretaker manager of the Malawi national football team on a temporary basis. In June 2019 it was announced that the role would be made permanent from 1 July 2019.
