= Charles Thom (footballer) =

Malawian footballer

Personal information
- Date of birth: 24 January 1999 (age 27)
- Place of birth: Malawi
- Position: Goalkeeper

Team information
- Current team: Silver Strikers

Senior career*
Years	Team	Apps	(Gls)
2019–	Silver Strikers		

International career^{‡}
2022–	Malawi	1	(0)
- * Club domestic league appearances and goals as of 04:38, 19 January 2022 (UTC) ‡ National team caps and goals as of 04:38, 19 January 2022 (UTC)

Charles Thom (born 24 January 1999), also known as Charles Thomu, is a Malawian professional footballer who plays as a goalkeeper for the Malawian club Silver Strikers, and the Malawi national team.

== Career ==
Thom began his senior career with Silver Strikers on 13 March 2019, signing a professional contract with the club for 3 years.

== International career ==
Thom was part of the Malawi squad the 2021 Africa Cup of Nations. He debuted with Malawi in the tournament in a 0–0 tie with Senegal on 18 January 2022, where he was named the man of the match.
