= Ernest Kakhobwe =

Malawian footballer

Personal information
- Date of birth: 26 June 1993 (age 33)
- Place of birth: Thyolo, Malawi
- Position: Goalkeeper

Team information
- Current team: Nyasa Big Bullets
- Number: 16

Senior career*
Years	Team	Apps	(Gls)
2013–2014	Bvumbwe Research		
2015	Mighty Tigers		
2016–	Nyasa Big Bullets		

International career^{‡}
2017–	Malawi	24	(0)
- * Club domestic league appearances and goals as of 17:01, 9 January 2022 (UTC) ‡ National team caps and goals as of 17:01, 9 January 2022 (UTC)~

Ernest Kakhobwe (born 26 June 1993) is a Malawian footballer who plays as a goalkeeper for Nyasa Big Bullets and the Malawi national team. He was included in Malawi's squad for the 2021 Africa Cup of Nations.
