= Bruce Kangwa =

Zimbabwean footballer (born 1988)

Personal information
- Date of birth: 24 February 1988 (age 38)
- Place of birth: Bulawayo, Zimbabwe
- Height: 1.65 m (5 ft 5 in)
- Position: Left-back

Team information
- Current team: CAPS United

Senior career*
Years	Team	Apps	(Gls)
2009–2016	Highlanders		
2016–2023	Azam		
2024–	CAPS United		

International career^{‡}
2009–2022	Zimbabwe	18	(0)
- * Club domestic league appearances and goals as of 16 January 2024 ‡ National team caps and goals as of 18 January 2022

Bruce Kangwa (born 24 February 1988) is a Zimbabwean professional footballer who plays as a left-back for CAPS United in the Zimbabwe Premier League.

== Career ==
Born in Bulawayo, Kangwa played for Highlanders and Tanzanian club Azam. He left Azam in summer 2023 after seven years with the club. In January 2024 he returned to Zimbabwe having agreed a two-year contract with CAPS United.

He made his international debut in 2009, and was named in the squad for the 2017 Africa Cup of Nations.
