= Kouekong Stadium =

Sports venue in Bafoussam, Cameroon

Coordinates: 5°28′41.2″N 10°32′47.6″E

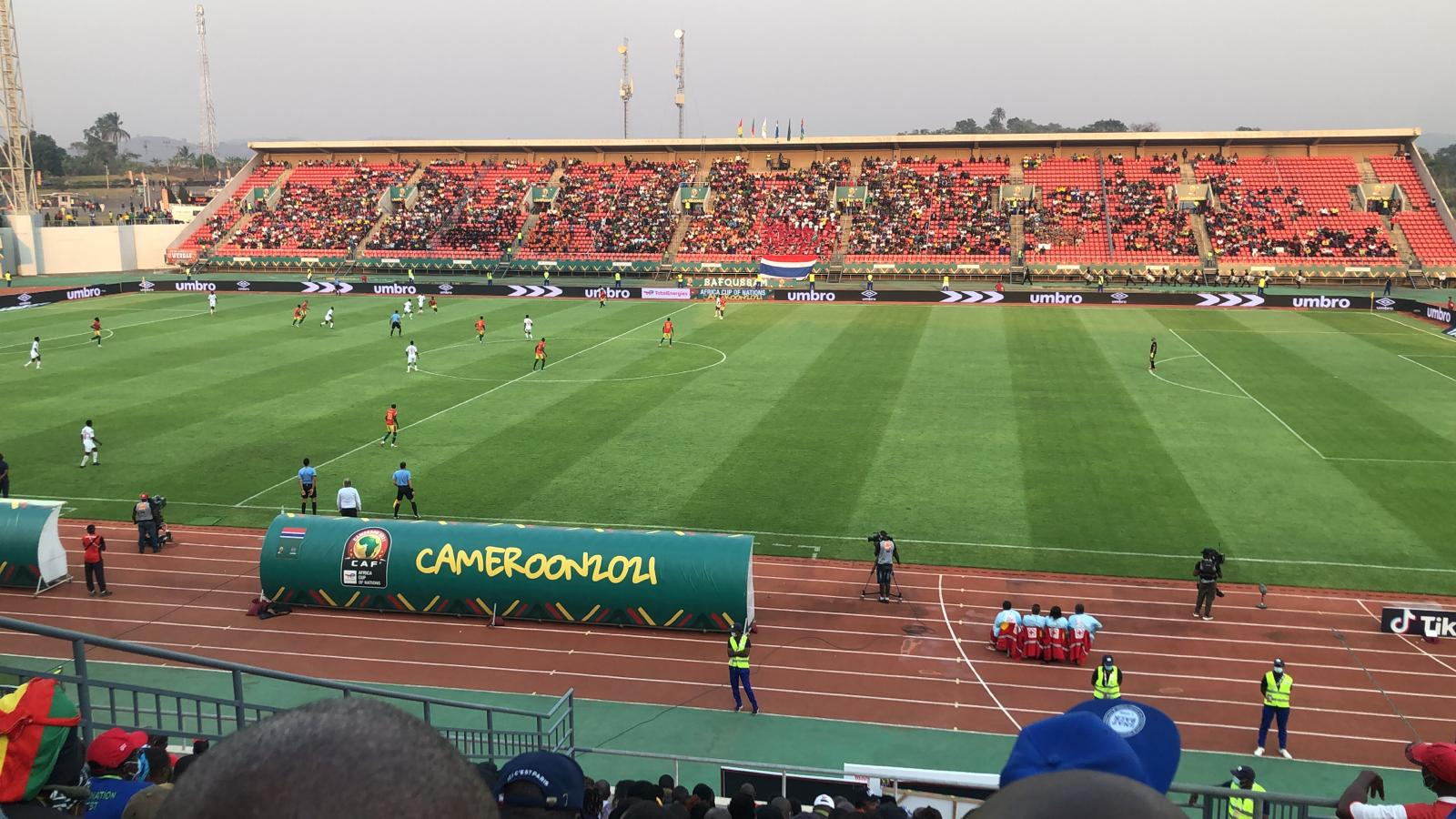
- Interactive map of Kouekong Stadium
- Full name: Stade omnisports de Bafoussam
- Location: Bafoussam, Cameroon
- Owner: Cameroonian Football Federation
- Capacity: 20,000
- Surface: Grass
- Field size: 68×105m

Construction
- Groundbreaking: 2014
- Built: 2015
- Opened: 2016
- General contractor: CMEC

Tenant
- Cameroon national football team

Kouekong Stadium is a multi-purpose stadium in Kouekong, a suburb of Bafoussam, Cameroon. It is used mostly for football matches and it also has athletics facilities. The stadium has seats for 20,000 people. It was built in 2015 and inaugurated on April 30, 2016. The stadium also hosted some matches of the 2021 Africa Cup of Nations.
