= Bulawayo City F.C. =

Zimbabwean football club

- Full name: Bulawayo City Football Club
- Nickname: Amakhosi
- Short name: Bulawayo City
- Founded: 2006

Bulawayo City F.C. is a Zimbabwean football club based in Bulawayo, formed in 2006. They were champions of the Southern Region Division One in 2015 and in 2019. Their home shirt colors are red shirts with white edges, white shorts and red socks.

== Current squad ==
Updated as of 7 April 2022. Note: Flags indicate national team as defined under FIFA eligibility rules; some limited exceptions apply. Players may hold more than one non-FIFA nationality.

No.	Pos.	Nation	Player
1	GK	ZIM	Bekimphilo Ncube
2	DF	ZIM	Lewis Ncube
3	MF	ZIM	Dominic Jaricha
4	DF	ZIM	Douglas Sibanda
7	MF	ZIM	Jacob Mloyi
10	FW	ZIM	Nqobile Ndlovu
14	MF	ZIM	Lesley Lunga
15	DF	ZIM	Mpumelelo Bhebhe
17	DF	ZIM	Lucas Sibanda
18	MF	ZIM	Melikhaya Ncube
21	MF	ZIM	Crispen Machisi
22	MF	ZIM	Elshamar Farasi
23	FW	ZIM	Mgcini Sibanda

No.	Pos.	Nation	Player
27	FW	ZIM	Dalubuhle Dlodlo
29	DF	ZIM	Wilfred Munorwei
33	MF	ZIM	Ntobeko Moyo
37	DF	ZIM	Brian Giant
42	MF	ZIM	Wisdom Mutasa
45	MF	ZIM	Genius Mutungamiri
54	GK	ZIM	Elton Sibanda
69	MF	ZIM	Vincent Moyo (captain)
88	MF	ZIM	Welcome Ndiweni
97	DF	ZIM	Nyasha Gurende
99	FW	ZIM	John Chinyerere
—	GK	ZIM	Reward Muza
