= 2021 Africa Cup of Nations =

International football contest

Coupe d'Afrique des Nations 2021
- Official logo

Tournament details
- Host country: Cameroon
- Dates: 9 January – 6 February 2022
- Teams: 24
- Venues: 6 (in 5 host cities)

Final positions
- Champions: Senegal (1st title)
- Runners-up: Egypt
- Third place: Cameroon
- Fourth place: Burkina Faso

Tournament statistics
- Matches played: 52
- Goals scored: 100 (1.92 per match)
- Top scorer: (Cameroon) Vincent Aboubakar (8 goals)
- Best player: (Senegal) Sadio Mané
- Best young player: (Burkina Faso) Issa Kaboré
- Best goalkeeper: (Senegal) Édouard Mendy
- Fair play award: Senegal

Map of countries qualified for the AFCON 2021 Qualified Failed to qualify Banned or did not enter Not a member of CAF

The 2021 Africa Cup of Nations (also referred to as AFCON 2021 or CAN 2021), known as the TotalEnergies 2021 Africa Cup of Nations for sponsorship reasons, was the 33rd edition of the Africa Cup of Nations, the biennial international men's football championship of Africa organised by the Confederation of African Football (CAF). The tournament was hosted by Cameroon, and took place from 9 January to 6 February 2022.

The tournament was originally scheduled to be played in June and July 2021. However, the CAF announced on 15 January 2020 that due to unfavourable climatic conditions during that period, the tournament had been rescheduled to be played between 9 January and 6 February 2021. On 30 June 2020, the CAF moved the tournament's dates for the second time to January 2022 following the effects of the COVID-19 pandemic across the continent, whilst retaining the name 2021 Africa Cup of Nations for sponsorship purposes.

Matches were played in six venues across five cities. The defending champions Algeria were eliminated in the first round after finishing bottom of their group. Senegal won their first AFCON title after defeating Egypt in the final 4–2 on penalties, following a 0–0 draw after extra time.

== Host selection ==
After the CAF Executive Committee meeting on 24 January 2014, it was announced that there were three official candidates for the 2021 edition:

Bids:

- Algeria
- Guinea
- Ivory Coast

Rejected bids:

- DR Congo
- Gabon
- Zambia

This list was different from the list of the host nation bids for both the 2019 and 2021 edition of the Cup of Nations as announced by CAF in November 2013, with Democratic Republic of the Congo, Gabon and Zambia also on the original list. All three official candidates also bid for hosting the 2019 Africa Cup of Nations.

The decision to award the hosting rights was postponed from early 2014 to grant each bidding country adequate time to receive the inspection delegation. After the final vote at the CAF Executive Committee meeting, on 20 September 2014, the CAF announced that the AFCON would be hosted in 2019 by Cameroon, in 2021 by Ivory Coast, and in 2023 by Guinea.

=== Host change ===
On 30 November 2018, CAF stripped Cameroon of hosting the 2019 Africa Cup of Nations because of delays in the construction of stadiums and other necessary infrastructure; it was relocated to Egypt. CAF President at the time, Ahmad Ahmad, said that Cameroon had agreed to host the 2021 tournament instead. Consequently, Ivory Coast, original hosts of 2021, would host the 2023 Africa Cup of Nations, and Guinea, original hosts of 2023, would host the 2025 Africa Cup of Nations. On 30 January 2019, the CAF President confirmed the timetable shift, after a meeting with Ivory Coast President, Alassane Ouattara, in Abidjan, Ivory Coast.

== Effects of the COVID-19 pandemic ==
The tournament was originally scheduled to take place between 9 January and 6 February 2021. The preliminary round and two matchdays of the qualifying group stage had already been played between 9 October and 19 November 2019. The third and fourth matchdays of the qualifying group stage, which were initially scheduled to take place from 23 to 31 March and 1 to 9 June 2020 respectively, were postponed and all remaining qualifying matches rescheduled due to the outbreak of the COVID-19 pandemic in Africa.

On 19 June 2020, the CAF stated it was undecided about when continental competitions would resume, and were prioritising new schedules for the 2019–20 CAF Champions League and the 2019–20 CAF Confederation Cup semi-finals, the postponed 2020 African Nations Championship and the 2020 Africa Women Cup of Nations, alongside the 2021 Africa Cup of Nation, as football competitions across the continent had been postponed, cancelled or suspended.

On 30 June 2020, however, the CAF announced the rescheduling of the 2021 Africa Cup of Nations to January 2022 "after consultation with stakeholders and taking into consideration the current global situation" according to a published statement, with new dates to be announced at a later date. Subsequently, other continental competitions and events to be held were rescheduled or cancelled, including new dates for the remaining AFCON qualifiers, which were now to be completed by March 2021. On 31 March 2021, it was confirmed that the final tournament would take place from 9 January to 6 February 2022, exactly one year after its originally scheduled start date.

== Qualification ==
=== Qualified teams ===
The following teams qualified for the tournament.

Team	Method of qualification	Date of qualification	Finals appearance	Last appearance	Previous best performance	FIFA ranking at start of event
Cameroon	Hosts / Group F winners	8 January 2019	20th	2019	Winners (1984, 1988, 2000, 2002, 2017)	50
Senegal	Group I winners	15 November 2020	16th	2019	Runners-up (2002, 2019)	20
Algeria	Group H winners	16 November 2020	19th	2019	Winners (1990, 2019)	29
Mali	Group A winners	17 November 2020	12th	2019	Runners-up (1972)	53
Tunisia	Group J winners	17 November 2020	20th	2019	Winners (2004)	30
Burkina Faso	Group B winners	24 March 2021	12th	2017	Runners-up (2013)	60
Guinea	Group A runners-up	24 March 2021	13th	2019	Runners-up (1976)	81
Comoros	Group G runners-up	25 March 2021	1st	None	Debut	132
Gabon	Group D runners-up	25 March 2021	8th	2017	Quarter-finals (1996, 2012)	89
Gambia	Group D winners	25 March 2021	1st	None	Debut	150
Egypt	Group G winners	25 March 2021	25th	2019	Winners (1957, 1959, 1986, 1998, 2006, 2008, 2010)	45
Ghana	Group C winners	25 March 2021	23rd	2019	Winners (1963, 1965, 1978, 1982)	52
Equatorial Guinea	Group J runners-up	25 March 2021	3rd	2015	Fourth place (2015)	114
Zimbabwe	Group H runners-up	25 March 2021	5th	2019	Group stage (2004, 2006, 2017, 2019)	121
Ivory Coast	Group K winners	26 March 2021	24th	2019	Winners (1992, 2015)	56
Morocco	Group E winners	26 March 2021	18th	2019	Winners (1976)	28
Nigeria	Group L winners	27 March 2021	19th	2019	Winners (1980, 1994, 2013)	36
Sudan	Group C runners-up	28 March 2021	9th	2012	Winners (1970)	125
Malawi	Group B runners-up	29 March 2021	3rd	2010	Group stage (1984, 2010)	129
Ethiopia	Group K runners-up	30 March 2021	11th	2013	Winners (1962)	137
Mauritania	Group E runners-up	30 March 2021	2nd	2019	Group stage (2019)	103
Guinea-Bissau	Group I runners-up	30 March 2021	3rd	2019	Group stage (2017, 2019)	106
Cape Verde	Group F runners-up	30 March 2021	3rd	2015	Quarter-finals (2013)	73
Sierra Leone	Group L runners-up	15 June 2021	3rd	1996	Group stage (1994, 1996)	108

== Format ==
A total of 24 teams competed in the final tournament. Only the hosts received an automatic qualification spot, with the other 23 teams qualifying through a qualification tournament. For the finals, the 24 teams were drawn into six groups of four teams. The teams in each group played a single round robin, and after the group stage, the top two teams from each group and the four highest ranked third-placed teams advanced to the round of 16. From then on the tournament proceeded with a knockout phase.

== Match ball ==
CAF announced the official match ball named Toghu on 23 November 2021. It was made by English manufacturer Umbro.

== Mascot ==
The mascot, "Mola", was unveiled on 17 May 2021, during a ceremony in Yaoundé. He was a lion and his kit bore resemblance to Cameroon's home colours, with words saying "Cameroon" with "2021" on the top and bottom of the kit.

== Match officials ==
The following referees were chosen for the 2021 Africa Cup of Nations, with two referees from CONCACAF assigned. The list consists of 24 referees, 31 assistant referees and eight video assistant referees from 36 countries. It includes Salima Mukansanga, who therefore became the first woman to referee at the Africa Cup of Nations.

=== Referees ===
- (Algeria) Mustapha Ghorbal
- (Angola) Hélder Martins Rodrigues de Carvalho
- (Botswana) Joshua Bondo
- (Burundi) Pacifique Ndabihawenimana
- (Cameroon) Blaise Yuven Ngwa
- (Egypt) Mahmoud El Banna
- (Egypt) Amin Omar
- (Ethiopia) Bamlak Tessema Weyesa
- (Ghana) Daniel Nii Laryea
- (The Gambia) Bakary Gassama
- (Guatemala) Mario Escobar (CONCACAF)
- (Kenya) Peter Waweru
- (Mali) Boubou Traore
- (Mauritania) Dahane Beida
- (Mauritius) Ahmad Imtehaz Heeralall
- (Morocco) Redouane Jiyed
- (Democratic Republic of the Congo) Jean-Jacques Ndala
- (Rwanda) Salima Mukansanga
- (Senegal) Maguette N'Diaye
- (Senegal) Issa Sy
- (Seychelles) Bernard Camille
- (South Africa) Victor Gomes
- (Tunisia) Sadok Selmi
- (Zambia) Janny Sikazwe

=== Assistant referees ===
- (Algeria) Abdelhak Etchiali
- (Algeria) Mokrane Gourari
- (Angola) Jerson Emiliano dos Santos
- (Burkina Faso) Seydou Tiama
- (Cameroon) Elvis Guy Noupue Nguegoue
- (Cameroon) Carine Atezambong Fomo
- (Chad) Issa Yaya
- (Comoros) Soulaimane Almadine
- (Egypt) Mahmoud Ahmed Abouelregal
- (Egypt) Ahmed Hossam Taha
- (Guinea) Sidiki Sidibe
- (Djibouti) Liban Abdourazak Ahmed
- (Kenya) Gilbert Cheruiyot
- (Lesotho) Souru Phatsoane
- (Libya) Attia Amsaaed
- (Madagascar) Lionel Andrianantenaina
- (Morocco) Mustapha Akarkad
- (Morocco) Lahcen Azgaou
- (Morocco) Zakaria Brinsi
- (Morocco) Fatiha Jermoumi
- (Mozambique) Arsenio Maringula
- (Niger) Mahamadou Yahaya
- (Nigeria) Samuel Pwadutakam
- (Democratic Republic of the Congo) Olivier Safari
- (Senegal) Djibril Camara
- (Senegal) El Hadj Malick Samba
- (Seychelles) James Fredrick Emile
- (South Africa) Zakhele Siwela
- (Sudan) Mohammed Abdallah Ibrahim
- (Tunisia) Khalil Hassani
- (Uganda) Dick Okello

=== Video assistant referees ===
- (Algeria) Lahlou Benbraham
- (Algeria) Mehdi Abid Charef
- (Egypt) Mahmoud Mohamed Ashour
- (Mexico) Fernando Guerrero (CONCACAF)
- (Morocco) Samir Guezzaz
- (Morocco) Adil Zourak
- (Morocco) Bouchra Karboubi
- (Tunisia) Haythem Guirat

== Draw ==
The final draw was originally scheduled to take place on 25 June 2021, but was postponed to 17 August 2021 due to logistical reasons relating to the COVID-19 pandemic. The 24 teams were divided into four groups of six each, with the four initial pots determined based on the August 2021 FIFA World Rankings (shown in parentheses), listed below. Cameroon and Algeria were automatically given the top two seeds as hosts and title holders, respectively.

Pot 1	Pot 2	Pot 3	Pot 4
Cameroon (54) (hosts); Algeria (30) (title holders); Senegal (21); Tunisia (28); Morocco (32); Nigeria (34)	Egypt (46); Ghana (52); Ivory Coast (57); Mali (60); Burkina Faso (62); Guinea (76)	Cape Verde (77); Gabon (85); Mauritania (100); Sierra Leone (106); Zimbabwe (108); Guinea-Bissau (109)	Malawi (118); Sudan (121); Equatorial Guinea (132); Comoros (133); Ethiopia (137); Gambia (148)

== Venues ==
Location of the host cities of the 2021 Africa Cup of Nations
1 Yaoundé
2 Douala
3 Garoua
4 Bafoussam
5 Limbe

With the Africa Cup of Nations expanded from 16 to 24 teams, six venues were used across five Cameroonian cities. The six stadiums selected to host matches were the Olembe Stadium and Ahmadou Ahidjo Stadium, both in the capital Yaoundé, the Japoma Stadium in Douala, the Limbe Stadium in Limbe, the Kouekong Stadium in Bafoussam and the Roumde Adjia Stadium in Garoua. The opening match of the tournament and the final took place at the newly built 60,000 seater Olembe Stadium in Yaoundé.

City	Stadium	Capacity
Yaoundé	Olembe Stadium	60,000
Yaoundé	Ahmadou Ahidjo Stadium	42,500
Douala	Japoma Stadium	50,000
Garoua	Roumdé Adjia Stadium	25,000
Bafoussam	Kouekong Stadium	20,000
Limbe	Limbe Stadium	20,000

== Opening ceremony ==
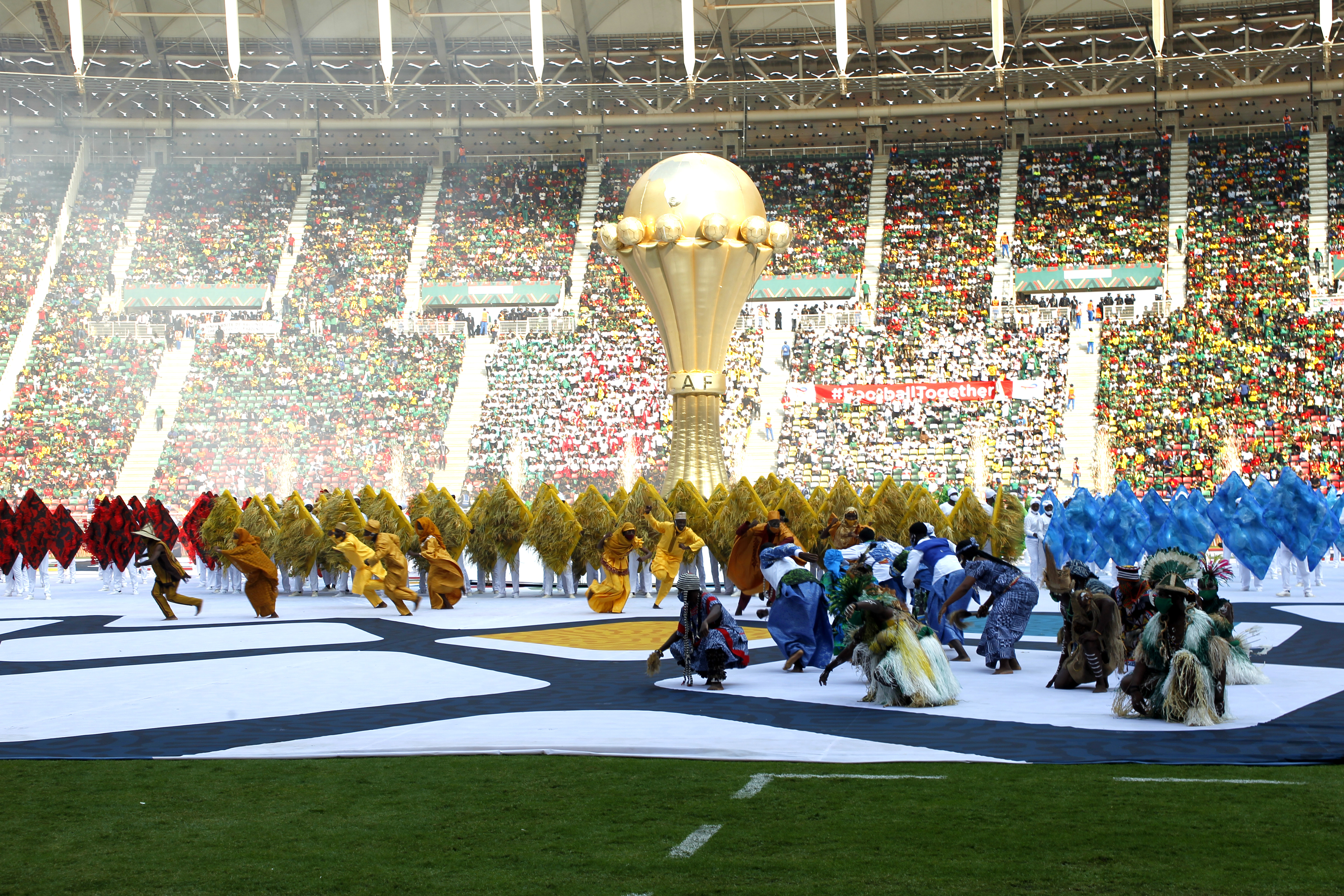
Atmosphere before the start of the AFCON launch ceremonies.

The opening ceremony of the stadium began at 10:00 with the setting up of the animation groups and the cultural activities which lasted until 14:00. Guests and officials were set up until the start of the opening match at 17:00. Among the guests were members of Confederation of African Football (CAF), members of the diplomatic corps, presidents of legislative and judicial institutions, members of government including the president of COCAN 2021 and the presidents of CAF and FIFA.

The set-up of officials ended by 16:00 with the arrival of the presidents of Comoros and Cameroon. After the performance of the hymns, the opening speech was made by Patrice Motsepe, CAF's president followed by the solemn opening of the competition by the President of the Republic of Cameroon, Paul Biya, after which a cultural parade of about an hour took place.

A cultural interlude representing the four cultural areas of Cameroon was presented with five hundred young ambassadors and the mascot Mola who participated in the dance, the host artist, Fally Ipupa offered a performance. During this parade, a virtual lion appeared to viewers, this was set up by Belgian graphic designer Thibault Baras on an idea of the creative company lib. Made in augmented reality and turned on a game engine, this lion was sixteen meters long, eight meters high and weighed a ton.

After the match, which took place from 17:00 to 19:00, there was a fireworks display.

== Group stage ==
The top two teams of each group, along with the best four third-placed teams, advanced to the round of 16.

=== Tiebreakers ===
Teams were ranked according to points (3 points for a win, 1 point for a draw, 0 points for a loss), and if tied on points, the following tiebreaking criteria were applied, in the order given, to determine the rankings (Regulations Article 74):

1. Points in head-to-head matches among tied teams;
2. Goal difference in head-to-head matches among tied teams;
3. Goals scored in head-to-head matches among tied teams;
4. If more than two teams were tied, and after applying all head-to-head criteria above, if two teams were still tied, all head-to-head criteria above were applied exclusively to these two teams;
5. Goal difference in all group matches;
6. Goals scored in all group matches;
7. Drawing of lots.

=== Group A ===
Pos	Team	Pld	W	D	L	GF	GA	GD	Pts	Qualification
1	Cameroon (H)	3	2	1	0	7	3	+4	7	Advance to knockout stage
2	Burkina Faso	3	1	1	1	3	3	0	4 (Note: Head-to-head result: Cape Verde 0–1 Burkina Faso.)	Advance to knockout stage
3	Cape Verde	3	1	1	1	2	2	0	4	Advance to knockout stage
4	Ethiopia	3	0	1	2	2	6	−4	1	

Source: CAF
(H) Hosts
Notes:
9 January 2022
17:00

Cameroon	2–1	Burkina Faso
Aboubakar 40' (pen.), 45+3' (pen.)	Report	Sangaré 24'

Olembe Stadium, Yaoundé
Referee: Mustapha Ghorbal (Algeria)
9 January 2022
20:00

Ethiopia	0–1	Cape Verde
	Report	J. Tavares 45+1'

Olembe Stadium, Yaoundé
Referee: Hélder Martins de Carvalho (Angola)

13 January 2022
17:00

Cameroon	4–1	Ethiopia
Toko Ekambi 8', 68'; Aboubakar 53', 55'	Report	Hotessa 4'

Olembe Stadium, Yaoundé
Referee: Jean-Jacques Ndala (DR Congo)
13 January 2022
20:00

Cape Verde	0–1	Burkina Faso
	Report	Bandé 39'

Olembe Stadium, Yaoundé
Referee: Amin Omar (Egypt)

17 January 2022
17:00

Cape Verde	1–1	Cameroon
Rodrigues 53'	Report	Aboubakar 39'

Olembe Stadium, Yaoundé
Referee: Sadok Selmi (Tunisia)
17 January 2022
17:00

Burkina Faso	1–1	Ethiopia
Bayala 25'	Report	Kebede 52' (pen.)

Kouekong Stadium, Bafoussam
Referee: Ahmad Heeralall (Mauritius)

=== Group B ===
Pos	Team	Pld	W	D	L	GF	GA	GD	Pts	Qualification
1	Senegal	3	1	2	0	1	0	+1	5	Advance to knockout stage
2	Guinea	3	1	1	1	2	2	0	4 (Note: Head-to-head result: Guinea 1–0 Malawi.)	Advance to knockout stage
3	Malawi	3	1	1	1	2	2	0	4	Advance to knockout stage
4	Zimbabwe	3	1	0	2	3	4	−1	3	

Source: CAF
Notes:
10 January 2022
14:00

Senegal	1–0	Zimbabwe
Mané 90+7' (pen.)	Report

Kouekong Stadium, Bafoussam
Referee: Mario Escobar (Guatemala)
10 January 2022
17:00

Guinea	1–0	Malawi
I. Sylla 35'	Report

Kouekong Stadium, Bafoussam
Referee: Daniel Nii Laryea (Ghana)

14 January 2022
14:00

Senegal	0–0	Guinea
	Report

Kouekong Stadium, Bafoussam
Referee: Bamlak Tessema Weyesa (Ethiopia)
14 January 2022
17:00

Malawi	2–1	Zimbabwe
Mhango 43', 58'	Report	Wadi 38'

Kouekong Stadium, Bafoussam
Referee: Dahane Beida (Mauritania)

18 January 2022
17:00

Malawi	0–0	Senegal
	Report

Kouekong Stadium, Bafoussam
Referee: Blaise Yuven Ngwa (Cameroon)
18 January 2022
17:00

Zimbabwe	2–1	Guinea
Musona 26'; Mahachi 43'	Report	Keïta 49'

Ahmadou Ahidjo Stadium, Yaoundé
Referee: Salima Mukansanga (Rwanda)

=== Group C ===
Pos	Team	Pld	W	D	L	GF	GA	GD	Pts	Qualification
1	Morocco	3	2	1	0	5	2	+3	7	Advance to knockout stage
2	Gabon	3	1	2	0	4	3	+1	5	Advance to knockout stage
3	Comoros	3	1	0	2	3	5	−2	3	Advance to knockout stage
4	Ghana	3	0	1	2	3	5	−2	1	

Source: CAF
10 January 2022
17:00

Morocco	1–0	Ghana
Boufal 83'	Report

Ahmadou Ahidjo Stadium, Yaoundé
Referee: Joshua Bondo (Botswana)
10 January 2022
20:00

Comoros	0–1	Gabon
	Report	Boupendza 16'

Ahmadou Ahidjo Stadium, Yaoundé
Referee: Peter Waweru (Kenya)

14 January 2022
17:00

Morocco	2–0	Comoros
Amallah 16'; Aboukhlal 88'	Report

Ahmadou Ahidjo Stadium, Yaoundé
Referee: Sadok Selmi (Tunisia)
14 January 2022
20:00

Gabon	1–1	Ghana
Allevinah 88'	Report	A. Ayew 18'

Ahmadou Ahidjo Stadium, Yaoundé
Referee: Lahlou Benbraham (Algeria)

18 January 2022
20:00

Gabon	2–2	Morocco
Allevinah 21'; Aguerd 81' (o.g.)	Report	Boufal 74' (pen.); Hakimi 84'

Ahmadou Ahidjo Stadium, Yaoundé
Referee: Dahane Beida (Mauritania)
18 January 2022
20:00

Ghana	2–3	Comoros
Boakye 64'; Djiku 77'	Report	Ben Nabouhane 4'; Mogni 62', 85'

Roumdé Adjia Stadium, Garoua
Referee: Boubou Traore (Mali)

=== Group D ===
Pos	Team	Pld	W	D	L	GF	GA	GD	Pts	Qualification
1	Nigeria	3	3	0	0	6	1	+5	9	Advance to knockout stage
2	Egypt	3	2	0	1	2	1	+1	6	Advance to knockout stage
3	Sudan	3	0	1	2	1	4	−3	1	
4	Guinea-Bissau	3	0	1	2	0	3	−3	1	

Source: CAF
11 January 2022
17:00

Nigeria	1–0	Egypt
Iheanacho 30'	Report

Roumdé Adjia Stadium, Garoua
Referee: Bakary Gassama (Gambia)
11 January 2022
20:00

Sudan	0–0	Guinea-Bissau
	Report

Roumdé Adjia Stadium, Garoua
Referee: Issa Sy (Senegal)

15 January 2022
17:00

Nigeria	3–1	Sudan
Chukwueze 3'; Awoniyi 45'; Simon 46'	Report	Khedr 70' (pen.)

Roumdé Adjia Stadium, Garoua
Referee: Victor Gomes (South Africa)
15 January 2022
20:00

Guinea-Bissau	0–1	Egypt
	Report	Salah 69'

Roumdé Adjia Stadium, Garoua
Referee: Pacifique Ndabihawenimana (Burundi)

19 January 2022
20:00

Guinea-Bissau	0–2	Nigeria
	Report	Sadiq 56'; Troost-Ekong 75'

Roumdé Adjia Stadium, Garoua
Referee: Peter Waweru (Kenya)
19 January 2022
20:00

Egypt	1–0	Sudan
Abdelmonem 35'	Report

Ahmadou Ahidjo Stadium, Yaoundé
Referee: Joshua Bondo (Botswana)

=== Group E ===
Pos	Team	Pld	W	D	L	GF	GA	GD	Pts	Qualification
1	Ivory Coast	3	2	1	0	6	3	+3	7	Advance to knockout stage
2	Equatorial Guinea	3	2	0	1	2	1	+1	6	Advance to knockout stage
3	Sierra Leone	3	0	2	1	2	3	−1	2	
4	Algeria	3	0	1	2	1	4	−3	1	

Source: CAF
11 January 2022
14:00

Algeria	0–0	Sierra Leone
	Report

Japoma Stadium, Douala
Referee: Ahmad Imetehaz Heeralall (Mauritius)
12 January 2022
20:00

Equatorial Guinea	0–1	Ivory Coast
	Report	Gradel 5'

Japoma Stadium, Douala
Referee: Redouane Jiyed (Morocco)

16 January 2022
17:00

Ivory Coast	2–2	Sierra Leone
Haller 25'; Pépé 65'	Report	Mu. Kamara 55'; A. Kamara 90+3'

Japoma Stadium, Douala
Referee: Maguette N'Diaye (Senegal)
16 January 2022
20:00

Algeria	0–1	Equatorial Guinea
	Report	Esteban 70'

Japoma Stadium, Douala
Referee: Mario Escobar (Guatemala)

20 January 2022
17:00

Ivory Coast	3–1	Algeria
Kessié 22'; I. Sangaré 39'; Pépé 54'	Report	Bendebka 73'

Japoma Stadium, Douala
Referee: Victor Gomes (South Africa)
20 January 2022
17:00

Sierra Leone	0–1	Equatorial Guinea
	Report	Ganet 38'

Limbe Stadium, Limbe
Referee: Mohamed Marouf Eid Mansour (Egypt)

=== Group F ===
Pos	Team	Pld	W	D	L	GF	GA	GD	Pts	Qualification
1	Mali	3	2	1	0	4	1	+3	7	Advance to knockout stage
2	Gambia	3	2	1	0	3	1	+2	7	Advance to knockout stage
3	Tunisia	3	1	0	2	4	2	+2	3	Advance to knockout stage
4	Mauritania	3	0	0	3	0	7	−7	0	

Source: CAF
12 January 2022
14:00

Tunisia	0–1	Mali
	Report	Koné 48' (pen.)

Limbe Stadium, Limbe
Referee: Janny Sikazwe (Zambia)
12 January 2022
17:45 (Note: The Mauritania v Gambia match was originally scheduled to kick-off at 17:00, but was delayed to 17:45 due to timing issues in the Tunisia v Mali match.)

Mauritania	0–1	Gambia
	Report	A. Jallow 10'

Limbe Stadium, Limbe
Referee: Mustapha Ghorbal (Algeria)

16 January 2022
14:00

Gambia	1–1	Mali
Mu. Barrow 90' (pen.)	Report	Koné 79' (pen.)

Limbe Stadium, Limbe
Referee: Samir Guezzaz (Morocco)
16 January 2022
17:00

Tunisia	4–0	Mauritania
Mathlouthi 4'; Khazri 9', 64'; Jaziri 66'	Report

Limbe Stadium, Limbe
Referee: Mahmoud El Banna (Egypt)

20 January 2022
20:00

Gambia	1–0	Tunisia
A. Jallow 90+3'	Report

Limbe Stadium, Limbe
Referee: Fernando Guerrero (Mexico)
20 January 2022
20:00

Mali	2–0	Mauritania
Haïdara 2'; Koné 49' (pen.)	Report

Japoma Stadium, Douala
Referee: Bernard Camille (Seychelles)

=== Ranking of third-placed teams ===
Pos	Grp	Team	Pld	W	D	L	GF	GA	GD	Pts	Qualification
1	A	Cape Verde	3	1	1	1	2	2	0	4	Advance to knockout stage
1	B	Malawi	3	1	1	1	2	2	0	4	Advance to knockout stage
3	F	Tunisia	3	1	0	2	4	2	+2	3	Advance to knockout stage
4	C	Comoros	3	1	0	2	3	5	−2	3	Advance to knockout stage
5	E	Sierra Leone	3	0	2	1	2	3	−1	2	
6	D	Sudan	3	0	1	2	1	4	−3	1	

Source: CAF
Rules for classification: 1) Points; 2) Goal difference; 3) Goals scored; 4) Drawing of lots.

=== Combinations of matches in the round of 16 ===
The specific match-ups involving the third-placed teams depended on which four third-placed teams qualified for the round of 16:

Combination according to the four qualified teams

Third-placed teams qualify from groups						1A vs	1B vs	1C vs	1D vs
A	B	C	D			3C	3D	3A	3B
A	B	C		E		3C	3A	3B	3E
A	B	C			F	3C	3A	3B	3F
A	B		D	E		3D	3A	3B	3E
A	B		D		F	3D	3A	3B	3F
A	B			E	F	3E	3A	3B	3F
A		C	D	E		3C	3D	3A	3E
A		C	D		F	3C	3D	3A	3F
A		C		E	F	3C	3A	3F	3E
A			D	E	F	3D	3A	3F	3E
	B	C	D	E		3C	3D	3B	3E
	B	C	D		F	3C	3D	3B	3F
	B	C		E	F	3E	3C	3B	3F
	B		D	E	F	3E	3D	3B	3F
		C	D	E	F	3C	3D	3F	3E

== Knockout stage ==
In the knockout stage, extra time and a penalty shoot-out were used to decide the winner if necessary, except for the third place match, where a direct penalty shoot-out, without any extra time, was used to decide the winner if necessary (Regulations Article 75).

=== Bracket ===
Round of 16
23 January – Limbe
Burkina Faso (p)	1 (7)
Gabon	1 (6)
23 January – Garoua
Nigeria	0
Tunisia	1
25 January – Bafoussam
Senegal	2
Cape Verde	0
26 January – Limbe
Mali	0 (5)
Equatorial Guinea (p)	0 (6)
24 January – Bafoussam
Guinea	0
Gambia	1
24 January – Yaoundé (Olembe)
Cameroon	2
Comoros	1
26 January – Douala
Ivory Coast	0 (4)
Egypt (p)	0 (5)
25 January – Yaoundé (Ahidjo)
Morocco	2
Malawi	1

Quarter-finals
29 January – Garoua
Burkina Faso	1
Tunisia	0
30 January – Yaoundé (Ahidjo)
Senegal	3
Equatorial Guinea	1
29 January – Douala
Gambia	0
Cameroon	2
30 January – Yaoundé (Ahidjo)
Egypt (a.e.t.)	2
Morocco	1

Semi-finals
2 February – Yaoundé (Ahidjo)
Burkina Faso	1
Senegal	3
3 February – Yaoundé (Olembe)
Cameroon	0 (1)
Egypt (p)	0 (3)

Final
6 February – Yaoundé (Olembe)
Senegal (p)	0 (4)
Egypt	0 (2)
Third place play-off
5 February – Yaoundé (Ahidjo)
Burkina Faso	3 (3)
Cameroon (p)	3 (5)

=== Round of 16 ===
23 January 2022
17:00

Burkina Faso	1–1 (a.e.t.)	Gabon
B. Traoré 28'	Report	Guira 90+1' (o.g.)
Penalties
Kaboré (penalty scored); S. Ouattara (penalty scored); E. Tapsoba (penalty scored); Simporé (penalty missed); Yago (penalty scored); Guira (penalty scored); Konaté (penalty scored); A. Tapsoba (penalty missed); I. Ouédraogo (penalty scored)	7–6	(penalty scored) Bouanga; (penalty scored) Méyé; (penalty scored) Boupendza; (penalty missed) Kanga; (penalty scored) Biyogo Poko; (penalty scored) Ecuele Manga; (penalty scored) Ameka; (penalty missed) N'Gakoutou; (penalty missed) Palun

Limbe Stadium, Limbe
Referee: Redouane Jiyed (Morocco)

23 January 2022
20:00

Nigeria	0–1	Tunisia
	Report	Msakni 47'

Roumdé Adjia Stadium, Garoua
Referee: Maguette N'Diaye (Senegal)

24 January 2022
17:00

Guinea	0–1	Gambia
	Report	Mu. Barrow 71'

Kouekong Stadium, Bafoussam
Referee: Amin Omar (Egypt)

24 January 2022
20:00

Cameroon	2–1	Comoros
Toko Ekambi 29'; Aboubakar 70'	Report	Y. M'Changama 81'

Olembe Stadium, Yaoundé
Referee: Bamlak Tessema Weyesa (Ethiopia)

25 January 2022
17:00

Senegal	2–0	Cape Verde
Mané 63'; B. Dieng 90+2'	Report

Kouekong Stadium, Bafoussam
Referee: Lahlou Benbraham (Algeria)

25 January 2022
20:00

Morocco	2–1	Malawi
En-Nesyri 45+2'; Hakimi 70'	Report	Mhango 7'

Ahmadou Ahidjo Stadium, Yaoundé
Referee: Pacifique Ndabihawenimana (Burundi)

26 January 2022
17:00

Ivory Coast	0–0 (a.e.t.)	Egypt
	Report
Penalties
Pépé (penalty scored); I. Sangaré (penalty scored); Bailly (penalty missed); Cornet (penalty scored); Zaha (penalty scored)	4–5	(penalty scored) Zizo; (penalty scored) El Solia; (penalty scored) Kamal; (penalty scored) Abdelmonem; (penalty scored) Salah

Japoma Stadium, Douala
Referee: Jean-Jacques Ndala (DR Congo)

26 January 2022
20:00

Mali	0–0 (a.e.t.)	Equatorial Guinea
	Report
Penalties
A. N. Traoré (penalty scored); Djenepo (penalty scored); M. Haïdara (penalty missed); Hama. Traoré (penalty missed); Touré (penalty scored); Dieng (penalty scored); Camara (penalty scored); Sacko (penalty missed)	5–6	(penalty missed) E. Nsue; (penalty scored) Belima; (penalty scored) Akapo; (penalty scored) Buyla; (penalty missed) Ganet; (penalty scored) Coco; (penalty scored) Salvador; (penalty scored) Eneme

Limbe Stadium, Limbe
Referee: Bakary Gassama (Gambia)

=== Quarter-finals ===
29 January 2022
17:00

Gambia	0–2	Cameroon
	Report	Toko Ekambi 50', 57'

Japoma Stadium, Douala
Attendance: 36,259
Referee: Pacifique Ndabihawenimana (Burundi)

29 January 2022
20:00

Burkina Faso	1–0	Tunisia
Da. Ouattara 45+3'	Report

Roumdé Adjia Stadium, Garoua
Referee: Joshua Bondo (Botswana)

30 January 2022
16:00 (Note: The Egypt v Morocco match was originally scheduled to kick-off at 17:00, but was rescheduled to 16:00.)

Egypt	2–1 (a.e.t.)	Morocco
Salah 53'; Trézéguet 100'	Report	Boufal 7' (pen.)

Ahmadou Ahidjo Stadium, Yaoundé (Note: The match was originally due to be held at Olembe Stadium in Yaoundé, but was relocated due to the investigation into the Yaoundé stadium disaster.)
Referee: Maguette N'Diaye (Senegal)

30 January 2022
20:00

Senegal	3–1	Equatorial Guinea
Diédhiou 28'; Kouyaté 68'; I. Sarr 79'	Report	Buyla 57'

Ahmadou Ahidjo Stadium, Yaoundé (Note: The match was originally due to be held at Japoma Stadium in Douala, but was relocated.)
Referee: Victor Gomes (South Africa)

=== Semi-finals ===
2 February 2022
20:00

Burkina Faso	1–3	Senegal
Touré 82'	Report	A. Diallo 70'; I. Gueye 76'; Mané 87'

Ahmadou Ahidjo Stadium, Yaoundé
Referee: Bamlak Tessema Weyesa (Ethiopia)

3 February 2022
20:00

Cameroon	0–0 (a.e.t.)	Egypt
	Report
Penalties
Aboubakar (penalty scored); Moukoudi (penalty missed); Léa Siliki (penalty missed); N'Jie (penalty missed)	1–3	(penalty scored) Zizo; (penalty scored) Abdelmonem; (penalty scored) Lasheen

Olembe Stadium, Yaoundé
Attendance: 24,371
Referee: Bakary Gassama (Gambia)

=== Third place play-off ===
5 February 2022
20:00 (Note: The match was originally due to be held on 6 February 2022 at 17:00, but was rescheduled due to security and convenience reasons.)

Burkina Faso	3–3	Cameroon
Yago 24'; A. Onana 43' (o.g.); Dj. Ouattara 49'	Report	Bahoken 71'; Aboubakar 85', 87'
Penalties
Kaboré (penalty scored); S. Ouattara (penalty scored); Touré (penalty missed); Yago (penalty scored)	3–5	(penalty scored) Aboubakar; (penalty scored) Ngamaleu; (penalty scored) Toko Ekambi; (penalty scored) Kunde; (penalty scored) Oyongo

Ahmadou Ahidjo Stadium, Yaoundé
Referee: Redouane Jiyed (Morocco)

=== Final ===
6 February 2022
20:00

Senegal	0–0 (a.e.t.)	Egypt
	Report
Penalties
Koulibaly (penalty scored); A. Diallo (penalty scored); B. Sarr (penalty missed); B. Dieng (penalty scored); Mané (penalty scored)	4–2	(penalty scored) Zizo; (penalty missed) Abdelmonem; (penalty scored) Mar. Hamdy; (penalty missed) Lasheen

Olembe Stadium, Yaoundé
Attendance: 48,000
Referee: Victor Gomes (South Africa)

== Statistics ==
=== Goalscorers ===
There were 100 goals scored in 52 matches, for an average of 1.92 goals per match.

8 goals

- (Cameroon) Vincent Aboubakar

5 goals

- (Cameroon) Karl Toko Ekambi

3 goals

- (Malawi) Gabadinho Mhango
- (Mali) Ibrahima Koné
- (Morocco) Sofiane Boufal
- (Senegal) Sadio Mané

2 goals

- (Comoros) Ahmed Mogni
- (Egypt) Mohamed Salah
- (Gabon) Jim Allevinah
- (The Gambia) Musa Barrow
- (The Gambia) Ablie Jallow
- (Ivory Coast) Nicolas Pépé
- (Morocco) Achraf Hakimi
- (Tunisia) Wahbi Khazri

1 goal

- (Algeria) Sofiane Bendebka
- (Burkina Faso) Hassane Bandé
- (Burkina Faso) Cyrille Bayala
- (Burkina Faso) Dango Ouattara
- (Burkina Faso) Djibril Ouattara
- (Burkina Faso) Gustavo Sangaré
- (Burkina Faso) Blati Touré
- (Burkina Faso) Bertrand Traoré
- (Burkina Faso) Steeve Yago
- (Cameroon) Stéphane Bahoken
- (Cape Verde) Garry Rodrigues
- (Cape Verde) Júlio Tavares
- (Comoros) Youssouf M'Changama
- (Comoros) El Fardou Ben Nabouhane
- (Egypt) Mohamed Abdelmonem
- (Egypt) Trézéguet
- (Equatorial Guinea) Jannick Buyla
- (Equatorial Guinea) Pablo Ganet
- (Equatorial Guinea) Esteban Obiang
- (Ethiopia) Dawa Hotessa
- (Ethiopia) Getaneh Kebede
- (Gabon) Aaron Boupendza
- (Ghana) André Ayew
- (Ghana) Richmond Boakye
- (Ghana) Alexander Djiku
- (Guinea) Naby Keïta
- (Guinea) Issiaga Sylla
- (Ivory Coast) Max Gradel
- (Ivory Coast) Sébastien Haller
- (Ivory Coast) Franck Kessié
- (Ivory Coast) Ibrahim Sangaré
- (Mali) Massadio Haïdara
- (Morocco) Zakaria Aboukhlal
- (Morocco) Selim Amallah
- (Morocco) Youssef En-Nesyri
- (Nigeria) Taiwo Awoniyi
- (Nigeria) Samuel Chukwueze
- (Nigeria) Kelechi Iheanacho
- (Nigeria) Umar Sadiq
- (Nigeria) Moses Simon
- (Nigeria) William Troost-Ekong
- (Senegal) Abdou Diallo
- (Senegal) Famara Diédhiou
- (Senegal) Bamba Dieng
- (Senegal) Idrissa Gueye
- (Senegal) Cheikhou Kouyaté
- (Senegal) Ismaïla Sarr
- (Sierra Leone) Alhaji Kamara
- (Sierra Leone) Musa Noah Kamara
- (Sudan) Walieldin Khedr
- (Tunisia) Seifeddine Jaziri
- (Tunisia) Hamza Mathlouthi
- (Tunisia) Youssef Msakni
- (Zimbabwe) Kudakwashe Mahachi
- (Zimbabwe) Knowledge Musona
- (Zimbabwe) Ishmael Wadi

1 own goal

- (Burkina Faso) Adama Guira (against Gabon)
- (Cameroon) André Onana (against Burkina Faso)
- (Morocco) Nayef Aguerd (against Gabon)

=== Discipline ===
A player was automatically suspended for the next match for the following offences:

- Receiving a red card (red card suspensions could be extended for serious offences)
- Receiving two yellow cards in two matches
- After the end of the group matches, all cautions received were cancelled for the rest of the competition. Nevertheless, a player having collected two yellow cards sustained the one match suspension.

The following suspensions occurred during the tournament:

Player(s)/Official(s)	Offence(s)	Suspension(s)
Group stage suspensions
(Ethiopia) Yared Bayeh	(red card) in Group A vs Cape Verde (matchday 1; 9 January 2022)	Group A vs Cameroon (matchday 2; 13 January 2022)
(Mali) El Bilal Touré	(red card) in Group F vs Tunisia (matchday 1; 12 January 2022)	Group F vs Gambia (matchday 2; 16 January 2022); Group F vs Mauritania (matchday 3; 20 January 2022)
(Zimbabwe) Teenage Hadebe	(yellow card) in Group B vs Senegal (matchday 1; 10 January 2022); (yellow card) in Group B vs Malawi (matchday 2; 14 January 2022)	Group B vs Guinea (matchday 3; 18 January 2022)
(Zimbabwe) Kelvin Madzongwe	(yellow card) in Group B vs Senegal (matchday 1; 10 January 2022); (yellow card) in Group B vs Malawi (matchday 2; 14 January 2022)	Group B vs Guinea (matchday 3; 18 January 2022)
(Ghana) Benjamin Tetteh	(red card) in Group C vs Gabon (matchday 2; 14 January 2022)	Group C vs Comoros (matchday 3; 18 January 2022)
(Mali) Moussa Djenepo	(yellow card) in Group F vs Tunisia (matchday 1; 12 January 2022); (yellow card) in Group F vs Gambia (matchday 2; 16 January 2022)	Group F vs Mauritania (matchday 3; 20 January 2022)
(Ghana) André Ayew	(red card) in Group C vs Comoros (matchday 3; 18 January 2022)	Suspension served outside tournament
(Sierra Leone) Kwame Quee	(yellow card) (yellow-red card) in Group E vs Equatorial Guinea (matchday 3; 20 January 2022)	Suspension served outside tournament
Knockout stage suspensions
(Senegal) Cheikhou Kouyaté	(yellow card) in Group B vs Guinea (matchday 2; 14 January 2022); (yellow card) in Group B vs Malawi (matchday 3; 18 January 2022)	Round of 16 vs Cape Verde (25 January 2022)
(Guinea) Naby Keïta	(yellow card) in Group B vs Senegal (matchday 2; 14 January 2022); (yellow card) in Group B vs Zimbabwe (matchday 3; 18 January 2022)	Round of 16 vs Gambia (24 January 2022)
(Comoros) Faïz Selemani	(yellow card) in Group C vs Morocco (matchday 2; 14 January 2022); (yellow card) in Group C vs Ghana (matchday 3; 18 January 2022)	Round of 16 vs Cameroon (24 January 2022)
(Tunisia) Hamza Mathlouthi	(yellow card) in Group F vs Mali (matchday 1; 12 January 2022); (yellow card) in Group F vs Gambia (matchday 3; 20 January 2022)	Round of 16 vs Nigeria (23 January 2022)
(Tunisia) Farouk Ben Mustapha	(red card) in Group F vs Gambia (matchday 3; 20 January 2022)	Round of 16 vs Nigeria (23 January 2022)
(Gabon) Sidney Obissa	(yellow card) (yellow-red card) in Round of 16 vs Burkina Faso (23 January 2022)	Suspension served outside tournament
(Nigeria) Alex Iwobi	(red card) in Round of 16 vs Tunisia (23 January 2022)	Suspension served outside tournament
(The Gambia) Yusupha Njie	(yellow card) (yellow-red card) in Round of 16 vs Guinea (24 January 2022)	Quarter-finals vs Cameroon (29 January 2022)
(Guinea) Ibrahima Conté II	(yellow card) (yellow-red card) in Round of 16 vs Gambia (24 January 2022)	Suspension served outside tournament
(Comoros) Jimmy Abdou	(red card) in Round of 16 vs Cameroon (24 January 2022)	Suspension served outside tournament
(Cape Verde) Patrick Andrade	(red card) in Round of 16 vs Senegal (25 January 2022)	Suspension served outside tournament
(Cape Verde) Vozinha	(red card) in Round of 16 vs Senegal (25 January 2022)	Suspension served outside tournament
(Burkina Faso) Dango Ouattara	(red card) in Quarter-finals vs Tunisia (29 January 2022)	Semi-finals vs Senegal (2 February 2022); Third place play-off vs Cameroon (5 February 2022)
(Burkina Faso) Adama Guira	(yellow card) in Round of 16 vs Gabon (23 January 2022); (yellow card) in Semi-finals vs Senegal (2 February 2022)	Third place play-off vs Cameroon (5 February 2022)
(Egypt) Omar Kamal	(yellow card) in Quarter-finals vs Morocco (30 January 2022); (yellow card) in Semi-finals vs Cameroon (3 February 2022)	Final vs Senegal (6 February 2022)

== Controversies ==
=== Tunisia vs. Mali refereeing ===
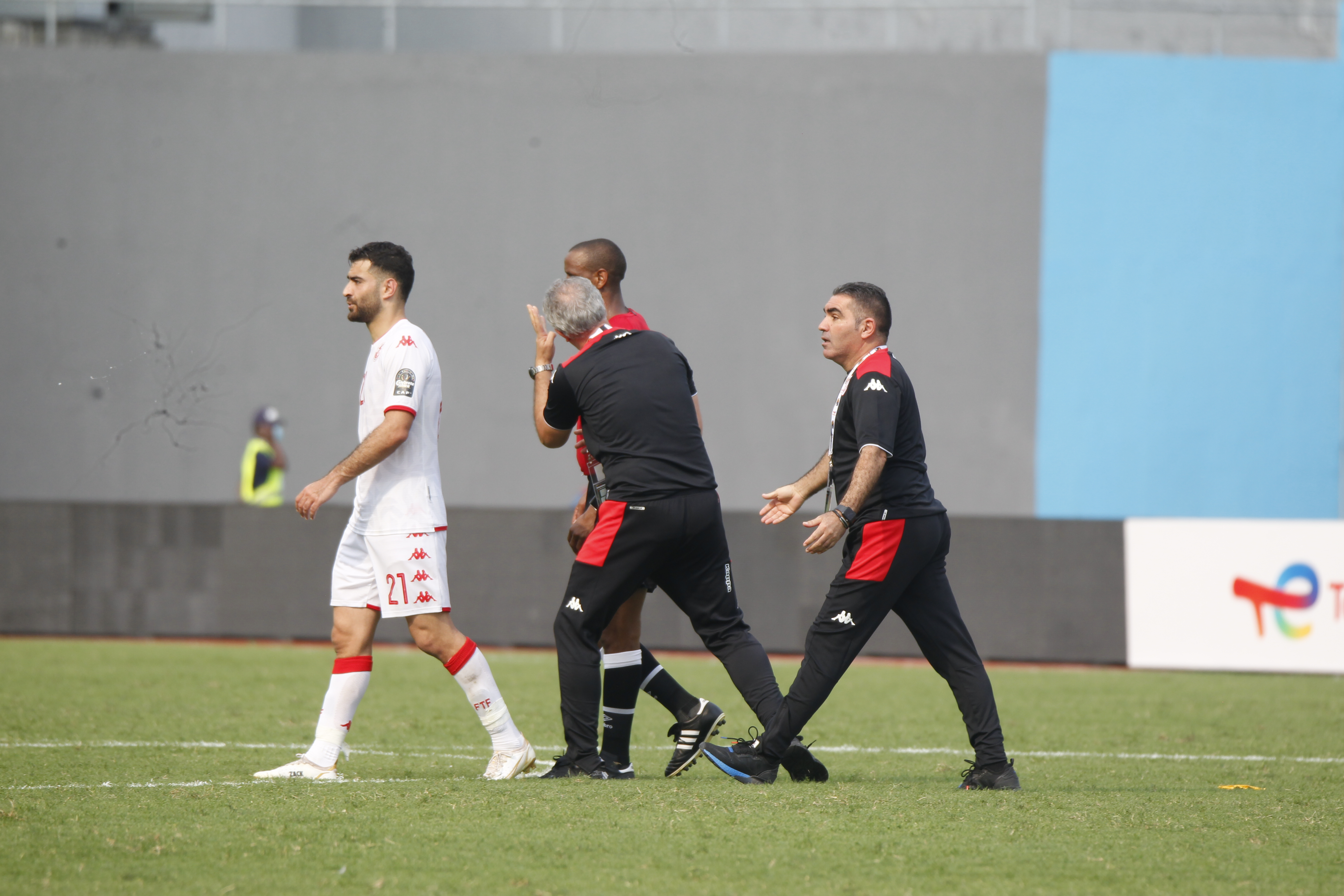
Mondher Kebaier and Jalel Kadri protesting against referee Janny Sikazwe after the controversy during the match against Mali at 2021 Afcon.

The match between Tunisia and Mali, the first meeting of Group F, was not played to completion. Zambian referee Janny Sikazwe initially whistled the end of the match in the 86th minute before changing his mind, warned by his assistant referee and the protests of the Tunisian players. He then signaled the end of the game in the 90th minute, seconds from the end of regulation time, just as the assistant referee was about to announce added time. In front of the furious Tunisians, the refereeing quartet had to leave the field under police escort.

Given the extent of the controversy, the resumption of the match, to play the remaining additional time, was announced. However, the Tunisian team refused to resume the match, claiming that the players were already in the showers, or out of the stadium, therefore unfit to resume the game. The Malians having presented themselves on the lawn, the end of the match is whistled with only one team on the ground, the result of 1–0 being ratified later by CAF.

Later, it was reported by different media that the referee Janny Sikazwe had in fact suffered a sunstroke in the middle of the game, so much so that he was even taken to the hospital, from where the presence of the fourth referee on the pitch at the time of the attempt to restart the match. According to the Tunisian player Wahbi Khazri, the referee of the match "was no longer coherent", "the referee lost the thread of the match" specified the Tunisian captain. "He was no longer consistent in his choices and decisions. He was very hot."

=== Cameroon fans crushed to death ===
Before the fourth match in the knockout stage between hosts Cameroon and the Comoros, which took place on 24 January 2022 at the Olembe Stadium, Cameroonian fans were crushed in a surge at the entrance. Eight deaths were recorded: two women and four men, all in their thirties, in addition to two children.

The ministry indicated that about 50 people were injured in the incident, including two people with multiple injuries and two others with serious head injuries, and a baby was immediately transferred to the General Hospital in Yaoundé in a medically stable condition.

=== Relocation of matches from Japoma Stadium ===
Initially, Japoma Stadium in Douala was scheduled to host four matches in the knockout stage, in addition to six in the group stage. However, after the field was criticised by coaches and players alike during the group stage, the organisation committee decided mid-tournament to relocate all matches from Japoma Stadium to other stadiums such as Limbe Stadium and Ahmadou Ahidjo Stadium in Yaoundé. Djamel Belmadi, coach of defending champions, Algeria, who left the tournament in the group stages, said that "It is not of a level permitting total fluidity and what we hope for from big tournaments like the African Cup of Nations".

== Awards ==
The following awards were given at the conclusion of the tournament:

Award	Winner	Ref.
Best Player	(Senegal) Sadio Mané	
Golden Boot	(Cameroon) Vincent Aboubakar (8 goals)	
Best Goalkeeper	(Senegal) Édouard Mendy	
Best Young Player	(Burkina Faso) Issa Kaboré	
Fair Play Award	Senegal	

=== Best XI ===
Goalkeeper	Defenders	Midfielders	Forwards	Coach
(Senegal) Édouard Mendy	(Morocco) Achraf Hakimi (Egypt) Mohamed Abdelmonem (Burkina Faso) Edmond Tapsoba (Senegal) Saliou Ciss	(Egypt) Mohamed Elneny (Senegal) Nampalys Mendy (Burkina Faso) Blati Touré	(Egypt) Mohamed Salah (Cameroon) Vincent Aboubakar (Senegal) Sadio Mané	(Senegal) Aliou Cissé

=== Final ranking ===
Matches that ended in extra time were counted as wins and defeats, while matches that ended in penalty shootout were counted as draws.

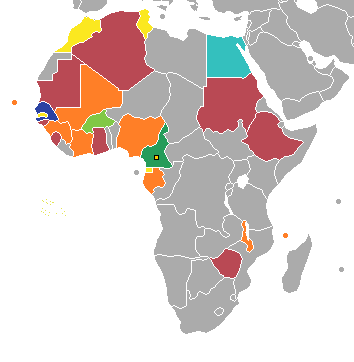
Results of the teams participating in the tournament Champion Runner-up Third place Fourth place Quarter-finals Round of 16 Group stage

Pos.	Team	G	Pld	W	D	L	Pts	GF	GA	GD
1	Senegal	B	7	4	3	0	15	9	2	+7
2	Egypt	D	7	3	3	1	12	4	2	+2
3	Cameroon	A	7	4	3	0	15	14	7	+7
4	Burkina Faso	A	7	2	3	2	9	9	10	−1
Eliminated in the quarter-finals
5	Morocco	C	5	3	1	1	10	8	5	+3
6	Gambia	F	5	3	1	1	10	4	3	+1
7	Equatorial Guinea	E	5	2	1	2	7	3	4	−1
8	Tunisia	F	5	2	0	3	6	5	3	+2
Eliminated in the round of 16
9	Nigeria	D	4	3	0	1	9	6	2	+4
10	Ivory Coast	E	4	2	2	0	8	6	3	+3
11	Mali	F	4	2	2	0	8	4	1	+3
12	Gabon	C	4	1	3	0	6	5	4	+1
13	Malawi	B	4	1	1	2	4	3	4	−1
14	Guinea	B	4	1	1	2	4	2	3	−1
15	Cape Verde	A	4	1	1	2	4	2	4	−2
16	Comoros	C	4	1	0	3	3	4	7	−3
Eliminated in the group stage
17	Zimbabwe	B	3	1	0	2	3	3	4	−1
18	Sierra Leone	E	3	0	2	1	2	2	3	−1
19	Ghana	C	3	0	1	2	1	3	5	−2
20	Algeria	E	3	0	1	2	1	1	4	−3
21	Sudan	D	3	0	1	2	1	1	4	−3
22	Guinea-Bissau	D	3	0	1	2	1	0	3	−3
23	Ethiopia	A	3	0	1	2	1	2	6	−4
24	Mauritania	F	3	0	0	3	0	0	7	−7
