= 2016 African Nations Championship squads =

The 2016 African Nations Championship is an international football tournament to be held in Rwanda from 16 January to 7 February 2016. Unlike the Africa Cup of Nations, this tournament requires players to be registered to a club within the country to be eligible. The 16 national teams involved in the tournament were required to register a squad of 23 players, including three goalkeepers. Only players in these squads were eligible to take part in the tournament. The squads were announced on 14 January 2016.

== Group A ==
=== Rwanda ===
Head Coach: (Northern Ireland) Johnny McKinstry

No.	Pos.	Player	Date of birth (age)	Club
1	GK	Eric Ndayishimiye	15 June 1988 (aged 27)	(Rwanda Football Federation) Rayon Sports F.C.
2	DF	Michel Rusheshangoga	25 August 1994 (aged 21)	(Rwanda Football Federation) APR FC
3	DF	Mwemere Ngirinshuti	1 January 1985 (aged 31)	(Rwanda Football Federation) Police F.C.
4	MF	Djihad Bizimana	12 December 1996 (aged 19)	(Rwanda Football Federation) APR FC
5	MF	Imran Nshimiyimana	8 August 1988 (aged 27)	(Rwanda Football Federation) Police F.C.
6	MF	Yannick Mukunzi	2 October 1995 (aged 20)	(Rwanda Football Federation) APR FC
7	MF	Rashid Kalisa	16 June 1996 (aged 19)	(Rwanda Football Federation) Police F.C.
8	DF	Emery Bayisenge	2 November 1994 (aged 21)	(Rwanda Football Federation) APR FC
9	FW	Jacques Tuyisenge	22 September 1991 (aged 24)	(Rwanda Football Federation) Police F.C.
10	FW	Dany Usengimana	10 March 1996 (aged 19)	(Rwanda Football Federation) Police F.C.
11	MF	Dominique Savio Nshuti	1 January 1997 (aged 19)	(Rwanda Football Federation) Rayon Sports F.C.
12	MF	Jean-Claude Iranzi	5 October 1990 (aged 25)	(Rwanda Football Federation) APR FC
13	DF	Fitina Omborenga	20 May 1996 (aged 19)	(Rwanda Football Federation) Kiyovu Sport
14	DF	Celestin Ndayishimiye	11 October 1994 (aged 21)	(Rwanda Football Federation) Mukura VS
15	DF	Faustin Usengimana	11 June 1994 (aged 21)	(Rwanda Football Federation) APR FC
16	MF	Ernest Sugira	27 March 1991 (aged 24)	(Rwanda Football Federation) AS Kigali
17	MF	Innocent Habyarimana	1 January 1987 (aged 29)	(Rwanda Football Federation) Police F.C.
18	GK	Olivier Kwizera	30 July 1995 (aged 20)	(Rwanda Football Federation) APR FC
19	FW	Yussufu Habimana	1 March 1988 (aged 27)	(Rwanda Football Federation) Mukura VS
20	MF	Hegman Ngomirakiza	23 March 1991 (aged 24)	(Rwanda Football Federation) Police F.C.
21	DF	Fiston Munezero	23 June 1990 (aged 25)	(Rwanda Football Federation) Rayon Sports F.C.
22	DF	Abdul Rwatubyaye	23 October 1996 (aged 19)	(Rwanda Football Federation) APR FC
23	GK	Jean-Claude Ndoli	7 October 1986 (aged 29)	(Rwanda Football Federation) APR FC

=== Gabon ===
Head Coach: Stéphane Bounguendza

No.	Pos.	Player	Date of birth (age)	Club
1	GK	Yves Bitséki Moto	23 April 1983 (aged 32)	(Gabonese Football Federation) CF Mounana
2	DF	Georges Ambourouet	1 May 1986 (aged 29)	(Gabonese Football Federation) Akanda FC
3	DF	Edmond Mouele	13 October 1988 (aged 27)	(Gabonese Football Federation) Mangasport
4	DF	Knox Ness-Younga	27 April 1994 (aged 21)	(Gabonese Football Federation) CF Mounana
5	DF	Auriol Pongui	1 March 1993 (aged 22)	(Gabonese Football Federation) Missile FC
6	MF	Tchen Kabi	27 April 1986 (aged 29)	(Gabonese Football Federation) Missile FC
7	FW	Allen Nono	15 August 1992 (aged 23)	(Gabonese Football Federation) AS Pelican
8	MF	Romuald Ntsitsigui	8 April 1991 (aged 24)	(Gabonese Football Federation) Mangasport
9	FW	Abdou Djamilou Atchabao	7 November 1990 (aged 25)	(Gabonese Football Federation) CF Mounana
10	MF	Wils Vladmir Aworet	8 April 1991 (aged 24)	(Gabonese Football Federation) Akanda FC
11	FW	Mario Bernard Mandrault	18 August 1998 (aged 17)	(Gabonese Football Federation) AS Pelican
12	FW	Cédric Ondo Biyoghé	17 August 1994 (aged 21)	(Gabonese Football Federation) CF Mounana
13	MF	Franck Obambou	26 June 1995 (aged 20)	(Gabonese Football Federation) Akanda FC
14	DF	Cyrille Avebe	3 February 1977 (aged 38)	(Gabonese Football Federation) Missile FC
15	DF	Prince Ndinga	30 November 1993 (aged 22)	(Gabonese Football Federation) Missile FC
16	GK	Laurhian Kantsouga	3 April 1988 (aged 27)	(Gabonese Football Federation) Mangasport
17	FW	Aaron Boupendza	7 August 1996 (aged 19)	(Gabonese Football Federation) CF Mounana
18	DF	Stéphane Heyong Essono	9 August 1993 (aged 22)	(Gabonese Football Federation) US Bitam
19	DF	Stevy Nzambe	4 September 1991 (aged 24)	(Gabonese Football Federation) AS Pelican
20	FW	Lionel Richie Yackouya	12 July 1990 (aged 25)	(Gabonese Football Federation) Mangasport
21	DF	Rodrigue Moundounga	28 August 1982 (aged 33)	(Gabonese Football Federation) Akanda FC
22	MF	Yann Gnassa	13 January 1993 (aged 23)	(Gabonese Football Federation) Mangasport
23	GK	Paulin Nzambi	5 May 1981 (aged 34)	(Gabonese Football Federation) Missile FC

=== Morocco ===
Head Coach: Mohamed Fakhir

No.	Pos.	Player	Date of birth (age)	Club
1	GK	Mohammed Amine El Bourkadi	22 February 1985 (aged 30)	(Royal Moroccan Football Federation) OC Khouribga
2	DF	El Mehdi El Bassil	14 December 1987 (aged 28)	(Royal Moroccan Football Federation) FUS Rabat
3	DF	Mohamed Abarhoun	3 May 1989 (aged 26)	(Royal Moroccan Football Federation) Moghreb Tétouan
4	DF	Jawad El Yamiq	29 February 1992 (aged 23)	(Royal Moroccan Football Federation) OC Khouribga
5	DF	Abderrahim Achchakir	15 December 1986 (aged 29)	(Royal Moroccan Football Federation) AS FAR Club
6	DF	Brahim Nekkach	5 May 1982 (aged 33)	(Royal Moroccan Football Federation) Wydad Casablanca
7	FW	Mohamed Ounajem	4 January 1992 (aged 24)	(Royal Moroccan Football Federation) Wydad Casablanca
8	FW	Zakaria Hadraf	12 March 1990 (aged 25)	(Royal Moroccan Football Federation) Difaâ El Jadidi
9	FW	Abdessalam Benjelloun	28 January 1985 (aged 30)	(Royal Moroccan Football Federation) FUS Rabat
10	FW	Abdessamad El Mobarky	1 January 1981 (aged 35)	(Royal Moroccan Football Federation) Chabab Rif Al Hoceima
11	FW	Abdeladim Khadrouf	3 January 1985 (aged 31)	(Royal Moroccan Football Federation) Moghreb Tétouan
12	GK	Abdelali Mhamdi	29 November 1991 (aged 24)	(Royal Moroccan Football Federation) RSB Berkane
13	DF	Anass Lamrabat	13 July 1993 (aged 22)	(Royal Moroccan Football Federation) Moghreb Tétouan
14	FW	Abdelghani Mouaoui	22 February 1989 (aged 26)	(Royal Moroccan Football Federation) IR Tanger
15	DF	Youssef Aguerdoum	12 March 1990 (aged 25)	(Royal Moroccan Football Federation) Difaâ El Jadidi
16	DF	Mohamed Oulhaj	6 January 1988 (aged 28)	(Royal Moroccan Football Federation) Raja Casablanca
17	DF	Marwane Saâdane	17 January 1992 (aged 23)	(Royal Moroccan Football Federation) FUS Rabat
18	MF	Abdelilah Hafidi	30 January 1992 (aged 23)	(Royal Moroccan Football Federation) Raja Casablanca
19	FW	Mourad Batna	27 June 1990 (aged 25)	(Royal Moroccan Football Federation) FUS Rabat
20	MF	Ahmed Jahouh	31 July 1988 (aged 27)	(Royal Moroccan Football Federation) Raja Casablanca
21	FW	Adil Karrouchy	23 November 1982 (aged 33)	(Royal Moroccan Football Federation) Raja Casablanca
22	GK	Abderrahman El-Houasli	2 December 1984 (aged 31)	(Royal Moroccan Football Federation) FUS Rabat
23	MF	Issam Erraki	5 January 1981 (aged 35)	(Royal Moroccan Football Federation) Raja Casablanca

=== Ivory Coast ===
Head Coach: (France) Michel Dussuyer

No.	Pos.	Player	Date of birth (age)	Club
1	GK	Drissa Bamba	10 December 1993 (aged 22)	(Ivorian Football Federation) Stade d'Abidjan
2	DF	Dagou Willie Britto	15 December 1996 (aged 19)	(Ivorian Football Federation) Association Sportive Tanda
3	DF	Marcelin Koffi	6 April 1985 (aged 30)	(Ivorian Football Federation) Association Sportive Tanda
4	DF	Marc Goua	2 November 1989 (aged 26)	(Ivorian Football Federation) ASEC Mimosas
5	MF	Essis Aka	10 January 1990 (aged 26)	(Ivorian Football Federation) Séwé Sport de San-Pédro
6	DF	Soualio Dabila Ouattara	23 November 1995 (aged 20)	(Ivorian Football Federation) Africa Sports d'Abidjan
7	FW	Djobo Atcho	30 January 1988 (aged 27)	(Ivorian Football Federation) Association Sportive Tanda
8	MF	Gbagnon Badie	5 October 1992 (aged 23)	(Ivorian Football Federation) Academie de Foot Amadou Diallo
9	DF	Adama Kangouté	6 December 1991 (aged 24)	(Ivorian Football Federation) ASEC Mimosas
10	FW	Yannick Zakri	26 March 1991 (aged 24)	(Ivorian Football Federation) ASEC Mimosas
11	FW	Koffi Boua	20 September 1986 (aged 29)	(Ivorian Football Federation) Association Sportive Tanda
12	MF	Yacé Okpekon	25 November 1986 (aged 29)	(Ivorian Football Federation) Africa Sports d'Abidjan
13	MF	Serge N'Guessan	31 July 1994 (aged 21)	(Ivorian Football Federation) Academie de Foot Amadou Diallo
14	FW	Guiza Djedje	2 November 1995 (aged 20)	(Ivorian Football Federation) Sewe Sports de San Pedro
15	DF	Diallo Kouassi	4 June 1989 (aged 26)	(Ivorian Football Federation) Williamsville Athletic Club
16	GK	Badra Ali Sangaré	30 May 1986 (aged 29)	(Ivorian Football Federation) Association Sportive Tanda
17	FW	Dominique Mevy	26 December 1994 (aged 21)	(Ivorian Football Federation) Moossou F.C.
18	FW	Wassawaly Toh	4 February 1988 (aged 27)	(Ivorian Football Federation) Yopougon FC
19	MF	Treika Blé	26 February 1992 (aged 23)	(Ivorian Football Federation) Sewe Sports de San Pedro
20	MF	Inza Diabaté	20 May 1992 (aged 23)	(Ivorian Football Federation) Association Sportive Tanda
21	DF	Cheick Comara	14 October 1993 (aged 22)	(Ivorian Football Federation) Academie de Foot Amadou Diallo
22	DF	Soualiho Coulibaly	15 August 1985 (aged 30)	(Ivorian Football Federation) Stade d'Abidjan
23	GK	Abdoul Karim Cissé	20 October 1985 (aged 30)	(Ivorian Football Federation) Sporting Club de Gagnoa

== Group B ==
=== DR Congo ===
No.	Pos.	Player	Date of birth (age)	Club
1	GK	Ley Matampi	18 April 1989 (aged 26)	(Congolese Association Football Federation) Daring Club Motema Pembe
2	DF	Junior Baometu	9 May 1994 (aged 21)	(Congolese Association Football Federation) Saint Eloi Lupopo
3	DF	Joyce Lomalisa	18 June 1993 (aged 22)	(Congolese Association Football Federation) AS V.Club
4	DF	Botuli Bompunga	30 January 1992 (aged 23)	(Congolese Association Football Federation) AS V.Club
5	MF	Nelson Munganga	27 July 1993 (aged 22)	(Congolese Association Football Federation) AS V.Club
6	MF	Meschak Elia	6 August 1997 (aged 18)	(Congolese Association Football Federation) CS Don Bosco
7	FW	Zacharie Mombo	12 December 1992 (aged 23)	(Congolese Association Football Federation) FC MK Etanchéité
8	MF	Doxa Gikanji	21 August 1990 (aged 25)	(Congolese Association Football Federation) Daring Club Motema Pembe
9	FW	Jean-Marc Makusu Mundele	27 March 1992 (aged 23)	(Congolese Association Football Federation) AS V.Club
10	FW	Héritier Luvumbu	23 July 1994 (aged 21)	(Congolese Association Football Federation) AS V.Club
11	MF	Ricky Tulengi	2 February 1993 (aged 22)	(Congolese Association Football Federation) Daring Club Motema Pembe
12	MF	Emmanuel Ngudikama	7 September 1987 (aged 28)	(Congolese Association Football Federation) AS V.Club
13	MF	Merveille Bokadi	21 May 1992 (aged 23)	(Congolese Association Football Federation) TP Mazembe
14	MF	Miché Mika	16 September 1996 (aged 19)	(Congolese Association Football Federation) CS Don Bosco
15	DF	Joël Kimwaki	14 October 1986 (aged 29)	(Congolese Association Football Federation) TP Mazembe
16	GK	Guelord Landu	14 September 1993 (aged 22)	(Congolese Association Football Federation) AS V.Club
17	MF	Guy Lusadisu	28 December 1982 (aged 33)	(Congolese Association Football Federation) AS V.Club
18	DF	Franck Mfuki	2 July 1993 (aged 22)	(Congolese Association Football Federation) FC MK Etanchéité
19	FW	Jonathan Bolingi	30 June 1994 (aged 21)	(Congolese Association Football Federation) TP Mazembe
20	FW	Cédric Ngulubi	22 October 1992 (aged 23)	(Congolese Association Football Federation) Sharks XI F.C.
21	DF	Christian Ngimbi	11 November 1987 (aged 28)	(Congolese Association Football Federation) FC Renaissance
22	DF	Yannick Bangala Litombo	12 April 1994 (aged 21)	(Congolese Association Football Federation) Daring Club Motema Pembe
23	GK	Héritier Nke	7 February 1992 (aged 23)	(Congolese Association Football Federation) FC Renaissance

=== Angola ===
No.	Pos.	Player	Date of birth (age)	Club
1	GK	Mário Hipólito	1 June 1985 (aged 30)	(Angolan Football Federation) Kabuscorp
2	DF	Natael Paulo Masuekama	23 September 1993 (aged 22)	(Angolan Football Federation) Recreativo do Libolo
3	DF	Domingos Cussanda	27 April 1984 (aged 31)	(Angolan Football Federation) Kabuscorp
4	DF	Fabrício Mafuta	28 November 1987 (aged 28)	(Angolan Football Federation) Interclube
5	DF	Nelson Sumbo Fonseca	10 June 1991 (aged 24)	(Angolan Football Federation) Benfica de Luanda
6	DF	Eddie Afonso	7 March 1994 (aged 21)	(Angolan Football Federation) Recreativo do Libolo
7	MF	Luvumbo Pedro	6 September 1988 (aged 27)	(Angolan Football Federation) Primeiro de Agosto
8	FW	Gelson	13 July 1996 (aged 19)	(Angolan Football Federation) Primeiro de Agosto
9	FW	Yano	8 July 1992 (aged 23)	(Angolan Football Federation) Progresso do Sambizanga
10	MF	Augusto Quibeto	27 November 1991 (aged 24)	(Angolan Football Federation) Petro de Luanda
11	FW	Ary Papel	6 May 1994 (aged 21)	(Angolan Football Federation) Primeiro de Agosto
12	GK	Landú	4 January 1990 (aged 26)	(Angolan Football Federation) Recreativo do Libolo
13	MF	Manucho Diniz	4 June 1986 (aged 29)	(Angolan Football Federation) Primeiro de Agosto
14	MF	Mateus Domingos	20 August 1993 (aged 22)	(Angolan Football Federation) Petro de Luanda
15	DF	Miguel Quiame	17 September 1991 (aged 24)	(Angolan Football Federation) Benfica de Luanda
16	FW	Bruno Tolombua Fernando	9 May 1989 (aged 26)	(Angolan Football Federation) Interclube
17	MF	Dani Traça	3 April 1987 (aged 28)	(Angolan Football Federation) Desportivo da Huíla
18	MF	Mingo Bile	15 June 1987 (aged 28)	(Angolan Football Federation) Primeiro de Agosto
19	DF	Antunes Sargento	10 January 1989 (aged 27)	(Angolan Football Federation) Primeiro de Agosto
20	MF	Silas Daniel Satonho	14 January 1990 (aged 26)	(Angolan Football Federation) Recreativo do Libolo
21	DF	Isaac Costa	25 April 1991 (aged 24)	(Angolan Football Federation) Primeiro de Agosto
22	GK	Antonio Dominique	25 July 1994 (aged 21)	(Angolan Football Federation) Primeiro de Agosto
23	MF	António Anato	19 January 1994 (aged 21)	(Angolan Football Federation) ASA

=== Cameroon ===
No.	Pos.	Player	Date of birth (age)	Club
1	GK	Pierre Sylvain Abogo	27 January 1998 (aged 17)	(Cameroonian Football Federation) Tonnerre Yaoundé
2	DF	Jonathan Ngwem	20 July 1991 (aged 24)	(Cameroonian Football Federation) Unisport FC
3	DF	Paul Serge Atangana Mvondo	4 March 1986 (aged 29)	(Cameroonian Football Federation) Coton Sport
4	DF	Djetei Mohamed	18 August 1994 (aged 21)	(Cameroonian Football Federation) Union Douala
5	DF	Aaron Mbimbe	19 March 1989 (aged 26)	(Cameroonian Football Federation) New Star
7	FW	Moussa Souleymanou	12 October 1994 (aged 21)	(Cameroonian Football Federation) Coton Sport
8	FW	Armel Ngondji	1 July 1995 (aged 20)	(Cameroonian Football Federation) Fovu Club
9	FW	Ronald Ngah	12 September 1991 (aged 24)	(Cameroonian Football Federation) Njala Quan SA
10	FW	Yazid Atouba	2 January 1993 (aged 23)	(Cameroonian Football Federation) Coton Sport
11	FW	Ghislain Mogou	23 July 1990 (aged 25)	(Cameroonian Football Federation) Yong Sports Academy
12	FW	Samuel Nlend	15 March 1995 (aged 20)	(Cameroonian Football Federation) Union Douala
13	FW	Moumi Ngamaleu	9 July 1994 (aged 21)	(Cameroonian Football Federation) Coton Sport
14	DF	Kombi Mandjang	1 June 1992 (aged 23)	(Cameroonian Football Federation) Union Douala
15	MF	Frank Boya	1 July 1996 (aged 19)	(Cameroonian Football Federation) APEJES Academy
16	GK	Hugo Nyamé	13 April 1986 (aged 29)	(Cameroonian Football Federation) Botafogo
17	MF	Stéphane Kingué Mpondo	2 June 1985 (aged 30)	(Cameroonian Football Federation) Coton Sport
18	MF	Mark O'Ojong	25 April 1997 (aged 18)	(Cameroonian Football Federation) Yong Sports Academy
19	DF	Nicolas Owono Mbassegue	22 December 1994 (aged 21)	(Cameroonian Football Federation) Dragon Club
20	FW	Francis Ambané	8 November 1984 (aged 31)	(Cameroonian Football Federation) AS Fortuna
21	DF	Carlain Manga Mbah	13 January 1993 (aged 23)	(Cameroonian Football Federation) Coton Sport
22	MF	Samuel Gouet	14 December 1997 (aged 18)	(Cameroonian Football Federation) APEJES Academy
23	GK	Derick Fru Anye	26 June 1995 (aged 20)	(Cameroonian Football Federation) Union Douala

=== Ethiopia ===
No.	Pos.	Player	Date of birth (age)	Club
1	GK	Abel Mamo	9 June 1994 (aged 21)	(Ethiopian Football Federation) Muger Cement
2	DF	Tekalign Dejene	14 July 1992 (aged 23)	(Ethiopian Football Federation) Dedebit F.C.
3	DF	Yared Belay	22 January 1995 (aged 20)	(Ethiopian Football Federation) Dashen Beer FC
4	DF	Tegegn Tesfaye	20 January 1991 (aged 24)	(Ethiopian Football Federation) Sidama Coffee
6	DF	Alula Girma	15 July 1993 (aged 22)	(Ethiopian Football Federation) Saint George SC
7	DF	Elias Mamo	28 December 1994 (aged 21)	(Ethiopian Football Federation) CBE SA
8	MF	Asrat Megersa	20 June 1987 (aged 28)	(Ethiopian Football Federation) Dashen Beer
9	FW	Ramkel Lok	10 August 1994 (aged 21)	(Ethiopian Football Federation) Saint George SC
10	MF	Tefesse Shewamene	4 May 1993 (aged 22)	(Ethiopian Football Federation) Awassa City F.C.
11	DF	Sulieman Mohamed	31 October 1987 (aged 28)	(Ethiopian Football Federation) Adama City F.C.
12	GK	Yidnekachew Beyene	31 October 1989 (aged 26)	(Ethiopian Football Federation) Defence Force SC
13	DF	Tadle Mergiya	5 April 1991 (aged 24)	(Ethiopian Football Federation) Arba Minch FC
15	DF	Aschalew Tamene	19 July 1996 (aged 19)	(Ethiopian Football Federation) Dedebit F.C.
16	MF	Samson Alemu	22 May 1993 (aged 22)	(Ethiopian Football Federation) Dedebit F.C.
17	DF	Seyoum Tesfaye	19 December 1989 (aged 26)	(Ethiopian Football Federation) Dedebit F.C.
18	FW	Mulualem Haile	13 December 1989 (aged 26)	(Ethiopian Football Federation) Defence Force SC
19	MF	Gatoch Panom	12 June 1994 (aged 21)	(Ethiopian Football Federation) Ethiopian Coffee F.C.
20	MF	Behailu Assefa	8 October 1988 (aged 27)	(Ethiopian Football Federation) Saint George SC
22	GK	Dereje Alemu	30 April 1990 (aged 25)	(Ethiopian Football Federation) Dashen Beer
23	DF	Wondifraw Getahun	9 June 1996 (aged 19)	(Ethiopian Football Federation) Ethiopian Coffee F.C.
	MF	Beneyam Demte	18 July 1998 (aged 17)	(Ethiopian Football Federation) CBE SA

== Group C ==
=== Tunisia ===
Head Coach: Hatem Missaoui

No.	Pos.	Player	Date of birth (age)	Club
1	GK	Rami Jeridi	15 September 1984 (aged 31)	(Tunisian Football Federation) CS Sfaxien
2	DF	Iheb Mbarki	14 February 1992 (aged 23)	(Tunisian Football Federation) Espérance de Tunis
3	DF	Slimane Kchok	7 May 1994 (aged 21)	(Tunisian Football Federation) CA Bizertin
4	DF	Zied Boughattas	5 December 1990 (aged 25)	(Tunisian Football Federation) Espérance de Tunis
5	DF	Ali Machani	12 July 1993 (aged 22)	(Tunisian Football Federation) Espérance de Tunis
6	MF	Yassine Meriah	2 July 1993 (aged 22)	(Tunisian Football Federation) CS Sfaxien
7	DF	Marouane Tej	28 April 1988 (aged 27)	(Tunisian Football Federation) Étoile du Sahel
8	MF	Abdelkader Oueslati	7 October 1991 (aged 24)	(Tunisian Football Federation) Club Africain
9	FW	Ahmed Akaichi	23 February 1989 (aged 26)	(Tunisian Football Federation) Étoile du Sahel
10	FW	Iheb Msakni	13 July 1988 (aged 27)	(Tunisian Football Federation) Étoile du Sahel
11	FW	Edem Rjaibi	5 April 1994 (aged 21)	(Tunisian Football Federation) Espérance de Tunis
12	DF	Ali Maâloul	1 January 1990 (aged 26)	(Tunisian Football Federation) CS Sfaxien
13	MF	Karim Aouadhi	2 June 1986 (aged 29)	(Tunisian Football Federation) CS Sfaxien
14	MF	Mohamed Amine Ben Amor	3 May 1992 (aged 23)	(Tunisian Football Federation) Étoile du Sahel
15	MF	Mohamed Ali Moncer	28 April 1991 (aged 24)	(Tunisian Football Federation) CS Sfaxien
16	GK	Mohamed Jebali	28 June 1990 (aged 25)	(Tunisian Football Federation) Étoile du Sahel
17	DF	Hamza Mathlouthi	25 July 1992 (aged 23)	(Tunisian Football Federation) CA Bizertin
18	FW	Saad Bguir	22 March 1994 (aged 21)	(Tunisian Football Federation) Espérance de Tunis
19	FW	Hichem Essifi	27 February 1987 (aged 28)	(Tunisian Football Federation) Stade Gabèsien
20	FW	Seifeddine Jaziri	11 February 1993 (aged 22)	(Tunisian Football Federation) Club Africain
21	DF	Zied Derbali	11 October 1984 (aged 31)	(Tunisian Football Federation) CS Sfaxien
22	GK	Ali Jemal	9 June 1990 (aged 25)	(Tunisian Football Federation) US Ben Guerdane
23	FW	Ahmed Hosni	14 December 1988 (aged 27)	(Tunisian Football Federation) Stade Gabèsien

=== Nigeria ===
Head Coach: Sunday Oliseh

No.	Pos.	Player	Date of birth (age)	Club
1	GK	Ikechukwu Ezenwa	16 October 1988 (aged 27)	(Nigeria Football Federation) Sunshine Stars F.C.
2	DF	Orji Kalu	19 June 1992 (aged 23)	(Nigeria Football Federation) Rangers International F.C.
3	DF	Chima Akas	3 May 1994 (aged 21)	(Nigeria Football Federation) Sharks F.C.
4	MF	Mohammed Usman	2 March 1994 (aged 21)	(Nigeria Football Federation) Taraba F.C.
5	DF	Austin Obaroakpo	10 November 1992 (aged 23)	(Nigeria Football Federation) Abia Warriors F.C.
6	DF	Jamiu Alimi	5 October 1992 (aged 23)	(Nigeria Football Federation) Shooting Stars F.C.
7	FW	Prince Aggreh	30 September 1996 (aged 19)	(Nigeria Football Federation) Sunshine Stars F.C.
8	MF	Ifeanyi Mathew	20 January 1997 (aged 18)	(Nigeria Football Federation) El-Kanemi Warriors F.C.
9	FW	Tunde Adeniji	17 September 1995 (aged 20)	(Nigeria Football Federation) Sunshine Stars F.C.
10	MF	Paul Onobi	27 December 1992 (aged 23)	(Nigeria Football Federation) Sunshine Stars F.C.
11	FW	Ezekiel Bassey	10 November 1996 (aged 19)	(Nigeria Football Federation) Enyimba International F.C.
12	MF	Bartholomew Ibenegbu	22 February 1986 (aged 29)	(Nigeria Football Federation) Warri Wolves F.C.
13	FW	Chisom Chikatara	24 November 1994 (aged 21)	(Nigeria Football Federation) Abia Warriors F.C.
14	DF	Matthew Etim	2 September 1989 (aged 26)	(Nigeria Football Federation) Rangers International F.C.
15	MF	Ibrahim Salawu	4 August 1994 (aged 21)	(Nigeria Football Federation) Shooting Stars F.C.
16	GK	Olufemi Thomas	5 August 1989 (aged 26)	(Nigeria Football Federation) Enyimba International F.C.
17	MF	Osas Okoro	7 September 1990 (aged 25)	(Nigeria Football Federation) Rangers International F.C.
18	MF	Yaro Bature	15 December 1995 (aged 20)	(Nigeria Football Federation) Nasarawa United F.C.
19	DF	Christopher Madaki	12 December 1995 (aged 20)	(Nigeria Football Federation) Giwa F.C.
20	FW	Bright Onyedikachi	12 June 1996 (aged 19)	(Nigeria Football Federation) Ifeanyi Ubah F.C.
21	DF	Stephen Eze	8 March 1994 (aged 21)	(Nigeria Football Federation) Sunshine Stars F.C.
22	DF	Samson Gbadebo	19 October 1996 (aged 19)	(Nigeria Football Federation) Lobi Stars F.C.
23	GK	Okiemute Odah	23 November 1988 (aged 27)	(Nigeria Football Federation) Warri Wolves F.C.

=== Niger ===
No.	Pos.	Player	Date of birth (age)	Club
1	GK	Moussa Alzouma	30 September 1982 (aged 33)	(Nigerien Football Federation) AS GNN
2	FW	Ibrahim Paraiso	1 January 1995 (aged 21)	(Nigerien Football Federation) AS GNN
3	DF	Ismael Inoussa	9 May 1994 (aged 21)	(Nigerien Football Federation) AS Douanes
4	DF	Kader Amadou	3 April 1989 (aged 26)	(Nigerien Football Federation) AS Sonidep
5	DF	Musa Shehu	2 February 1985 (aged 30)	(Nigerien Football Federation) Sahel SC
6	MF	Youssouf Oumarou	16 February 1993 (aged 22)	(Nigerien Football Federation) AS FAN
7	FW	Adamou Moussa	1 January 1995 (aged 21)	(Nigerien Football Federation) AS FAN
8	MF	Abdoul Aziz Abdou	25 March 1990 (aged 25)	(Nigerien Football Federation) ASN Nigelec
9	FW	Idrissa Halidou	3 July 1982 (aged 33)	(Nigerien Football Federation) AS GNN
10	FW	Mossi Issa Moussa	24 January 1993 (aged 22)	(Nigerien Football Federation) Sahel SC
11	FW	Victorien Adebayor	12 November 1996 (aged 19)	(Nigerien Football Federation) AS Douanes
12	MF	Souleymane Dela Sacko	29 April 1984 (aged 31)	(Nigerien Football Federation) AS GNN
13	DF	Tijani Ganiyu	8 September 1991 (aged 24)	(Nigerien Football Federation) ASN Nigelec
14	FW	Imarana Seyni	1 January 1992 (aged 24)	(Nigerien Football Federation) AS FAN
15	DF	Boureima Katakoré	26 March 1993 (aged 22)	(Nigerien Football Federation) AS FAN
16	GK	Oumarou Soumaila	24 October 1987 (aged 28)	(Nigerien Football Federation) US GN
17	DF	Mahamadou Souley	18 February 1995 (aged 20)	(Nigerien Football Federation) AS GNN
18	DF	Koffi Dan Kowa	17 September 1989 (aged 26)	(Nigerien Football Federation) Sahel SC
19	MF	Issiakou Koudize	18 October 1990 (aged 25)	(Nigerien Football Federation) AS GNN
20	DF	Harouna Ali Seydou	5 February 1996 (aged 19)	(Nigerien Football Federation) ASN Nigelec
21	FW	Moctar Yacouba	18 July 1994 (aged 21)	(Nigerien Football Federation) ASN Nigelec
22	GK	Issaka Oumarou	2 December 1990 (aged 25)	(Nigerien Football Federation) AS Douanes
23	MF	Sanoussi Tahirou	2 February 1993 (aged 22)	(Nigerien Football Federation) AS GNN

=== Guinea ===
No.	Pos.	Player	Date of birth (age)	Club
1	GK	Abdoulaye Kanté	18 February 1993 (aged 22)	(Guinean Football Federation) AS Kaloum
2	MF	Mohamed Thiam	22 June 1996 (aged 19)	(Guinean Football Federation) AS Kaloum
3	DF	Ibrahima Sory Bangoura	25 July 1987 (aged 28)	(Guinean Football Federation) Horoya AC
4	MF	Thierno Camara	7 July 1995 (aged 20)	(Guinean Football Federation) FC Sequence
5	DF	Alseny Bangoura	1 October 1993 (aged 22)	(Guinean Football Federation) Horoya AC
6	MF	Ibrahima Sory Sankhon	1 January 1996 (aged 20)	(Guinean Football Federation) Horoya AC
7	FW	Boniface Haba	30 September 1996 (aged 19)	(Guinean Football Federation) Horoya AC
8	MF	Ibrahima Sory Soumah	22 February 1975 (aged 40)	(Guinean Football Federation) AS Kaloum
9	FW	Abdulaye Samaké	1 January 1996 (aged 20)	(Guinean Football Federation) Hafia FC
10	MF	Aboubacar Mouctar Sylla	23 May 1995 (aged 20)	(Guinean Football Federation) Hafia FC
11	MF	Moussa Diawara	15 October 1994 (aged 21)	(Guinean Football Federation) AS Kaloum
12	MF	Aboubacar Sylla	1 May 1993 (aged 22)	(Guinean Football Federation) AS Kaloum
13	DF	Alsény Camara	1 June 1996 (aged 19)	(Guinean Football Federation) AS Kaloum
14	MF	Jean Mouste	2 January 1994 (aged 22)	(Guinean Football Federation) Hafia FC
15	FW	Alsény Camara	4 January 1995 (aged 21)	(Guinean Football Federation) AS Kaloum
16	GK	Abdul Aziz Keita	16 February 1989 (aged 26)	(Guinean Football Federation) AS Kaloum
17	FW	Daouda Camara	20 August 1997 (aged 18)	(Guinean Football Federation) Horoya AC
18	FW	Kilé Bangoura	7 July 1994 (aged 21)	(Guinean Football Federation) Soumba FC
19	DF	Mohamed Youla	9 July 1996 (aged 19)	(Guinean Football Federation) AS Kaloum
20	MF	Issiaga Camara	5 June 1997 (aged 18)	(Guinean Football Federation) Horoya AC
21	DF	Ibrahima Aminata Conde	5 February 1998 (aged 17)	(Guinean Football Federation) Horoya AC
22	GK	Nouhan Condé	22 July 1995 (aged 20)	(Guinean Football Federation) Satellite
23	DF	Aboubacar Leo Camara	1 January 1993 (aged 23)	(Guinean Football Federation) AS Kaloum

== Group D ==
=== Zimbabwe ===
No.	Pos.	Player	Date of birth (age)	Club
1	GK	Bernard Donovan	12 July 1995 (aged 20)	(Zimbabwe Football Association) How Mine F.C.
2	DF	Elisha Muroiwa	28 January 1989 (aged 26)	(Zimbabwe Football Association) Dynamos F.C.
3	DF	Ocean Mushure	1 July 1985 (aged 30)	(Zimbabwe Football Association) Dynamos F.C.
4	DF	Lawrence Mhlanga	20 December 1993 (aged 22)	(Zimbabwe Football Association) Highlanders F.C.
5	MF	Joel Ngodzo	1 December 1990 (aged 25)	(Zimbabwe Football Association) Caps United
6	DF	Hardlife Zvirekwi	5 May 1987 (aged 28)	(Zimbabwe Football Association) Caps United
7	FW	Rodreck Mutuma	5 April 1988 (aged 27)	(Zimbabwe Football Association) Dynamos F.C.
8	MF	Gerald Takwara	29 October 1994 (aged 21)	(Zimbabwe Football Association) F.C. Platinum
9	MF	Farai Madhanaga	14 February 1995 (aged 20)	(Zimbabwe Football Association) Flame Lily
10	FW	Knox Mutizwa	12 October 1993 (aged 22)	(Zimbabwe Football Association) Highlanders F.C.
11	MF	Ronald Chitiyo	10 June 1992 (aged 23)	(Zimbabwe Football Association) Dynamos F.C.
12	DF	Bruce Kangwa	24 February 1988 (aged 27)	(Zimbabwe Football Association) Highlanders F.C.
13	DF	Stephen Mukatuka	19 December 1998 (aged 17)	(Zimbabwe Football Association) Caps United
14	MF	Raphael Manuvire	21 September 1988 (aged 27)	(Zimbabwe Football Association) ZPC Kariba F.C.
15	MF	Nqobizitha Masuku	7 June 1993 (aged 22)	(Zimbabwe Football Association) Highlanders F.C.
16	GK	Tatenda Mkuruva	4 January 1996 (aged 20)	(Zimbabwe Football Association) Dynamos F.C.
17	MF	Marshal Mudehwe	17 August 1993 (aged 22)	(Zimbabwe Football Association) F.C. Platinum
18	FW	Francisco Zekumbawira	6 August 1990 (aged 25)	(Zimbabwe Football Association) Harare City F.C.
19	FW	Moses Demera	3 March 1989 (aged 26)	(Zimbabwe Football Association) Flame Lily
20	FW	William Manondo	2 April 1991 (aged 24)	(Zimbabwe Football Association) Harare City F.C.
21	FW	Edmore Chirambadare	24 January 1992 (aged 23)	(Zimbabwe Football Association) Chicken Inn F.C.
22	DF	Blessing Moyo	4 April 1995 (aged 20)	(Zimbabwe Football Association) Dynamos F.C.
23	GK	Elvis Chipezeze	11 March 1990 (aged 25)	(Zimbabwe Football Association) Chicken Inn F.C.

=== Mali ===
No.	Pos.	Player	Date of birth (age)	Club
1	GK	Samuel Diarra	11 August 1998 (aged 17)	(Malian Football Federation) AS Korofina
2	DF	Ousmane Diarra	20 December 1990 (aged 25)	(Malian Football Federation) Onze Créateurs
3	DF	Abdoulaye Traoré	30 October 1994 (aged 21)	(Malian Football Federation) Djoliba AC
4	DF	Issaka Samaké	20 October 1994 (aged 21)	(Malian Football Federation) Stade Malien
5	DF	Marius Hamed Assoko	2 February 1991 (aged 24)	(Malian Football Federation) Onze Créateurs
6	MF	Sékou Diarra	27 July 1993 (aged 22)	(Malian Football Federation) Onze Créateurs
7	MF	Abdoul Touré	8 September 1990 (aged 25)	(Malian Football Federation) AS Real Bamako
8	MF	Yves Bissouma	30 August 1996 (aged 19)	(Malian Football Federation) AS Real Bamako
9	FW	Hamidou Sinayoko	11 March 1986 (aged 29)	(Malian Football Federation) Djoliba AC
10	FW	Mamadou Coulibaly	27 July 1985 (aged 30)	(Malian Football Federation) Stade Malien
11	MF	Lamine Traoré	21 September 1993 (aged 22)	(Malian Football Federation) Onze Créateurs
12	MF	Lassana Samaké	8 December 1992 (aged 23)	(Malian Football Federation) Onze Créateurs
13	MF	Moussa Sissoko	15 April 1995 (aged 20)	(Malian Football Federation) Onze Créateurs
14	DF	Oumar Koné	13 April 1991 (aged 24)	(Malian Football Federation) Stade Malien de Bamako
15	MF	Mahamadou Doumbia	28 February 1995 (aged 20)	(Malian Football Federation) Stade Malien
16	GK	Djigui Diarra	27 February 1995 (aged 20)	(Malian Football Federation) Stade Malien
17	FW	Rominigue Kouamé	17 December 1996 (aged 19)	(Malian Football Federation) AS Real Bamako
18	DF	Aliou Dieng	16 October 1997 (aged 18)	(Malian Football Federation) Djoliba AC
19	MF	Abdoulaye Diarra	28 December 1994 (aged 21)	(Malian Football Federation) CO Bamako
20	MF	Yaya Samaké	3 May 1994 (aged 21)	(Malian Football Federation) AS Nianan
21	DF	Abdoul Karim Danté	29 October 1998 (aged 17)	(Malian Football Federation) Jeanne d'Arc FC
22	GK	Alassane Diallo	17 July 1987 (aged 28)	(Malian Football Federation) Onze Créateurs
23	MF	N'Tji Amadou Samake	20 July 1995 (aged 20)	(Malian Football Federation) Stade Malien

=== Uganda ===
No.	Pos.	Player	Date of birth (age)	Club
1	GK	Mathias Kigonya	2 February 1996 (aged 19)	(Federation of Uganda Football Associations) Bright Stars FC
2	DF	Dennis Okot	1 December 1990 (aged 25)	(Federation of Uganda Football Associations) KCCA F.C.
3	DF	Joseph Nsubuga	9 October 1996 (aged 19)	(Federation of Uganda Football Associations) Bright Stars FC
4	DF	Richard Kassaga	4 July 1993 (aged 22)	(Federation of Uganda Football Associations) URA F.C.
5	DF	Bernard Muwanga	25 August 1993 (aged 22)	(Federation of Uganda Football Associations) Bright Stars FC
6	MF	Kizito Keziron	17 January 1997 (aged 18)	(Federation of Uganda Football Associations) Vipers Sports Club
7	DF	Joseph Ochaya	14 December 1993 (aged 22)	(Federation of Uganda Football Associations) KCCA F.C.
8	MF	Muzamir Mutyaba	10 October 1993 (aged 22)	(Federation of Uganda Football Associations) KCCA F.C.
9	FW	Robert Ssentongo	5 June 1988 (aged 27)	(Federation of Uganda Football Associations) URA F.C.
10	FW	Farouk Miya	26 November 1997 (aged 18)	(Federation of Uganda Football Associations) Vipers Sports Club
11	MF	Erisa Ssekisambu	28 August 1995 (aged 20)	(Federation of Uganda Football Associations) Vipers Sports Club
12	DF	Hassan Wasswa	6 April 1993 (aged 22)	(Federation of Uganda Football Associations) KCCA F.C.
13	FW	Frank Kalanda	8 August 1991 (aged 24)	(Federation of Uganda Football Associations) URA F.C.
14	FW	Geoffrey Sserunkuma	6 July 1983 (aged 32)	(Federation of Uganda Football Associations) Lweza F.C.
15	FW	Caesar Okhuti	7 October 1990 (aged 25)	(Federation of Uganda Football Associations) Express F.C.
16	MF	Ivan Ntege	8 September 1994 (aged 21)	(Federation of Uganda Football Associations) KCCA F.C.
17	MF	Isaac Muleme	10 October 1992 (aged 23)	(Federation of Uganda Football Associations) S.C. Villa
18	GK	Isima Watenga	15 May 1995 (aged 20)	(Federation of Uganda Football Associations) Vipers Sports Club
19	DF	Timothy Awany	6 August 1996 (aged 19)	(Federation of Uganda Football Associations) KCCA F.C.
20	GK	James Alitho	25 August 1995 (aged 20)	(Federation of Uganda Football Associations) Vipers S.C.
21	MF	Kirya Ambrose	11 July 1996 (aged 19)	(Federation of Uganda Football Associations) S.C. Villa
22	MF	Martin Kizza	10 October 1997 (aged 18)	(Federation of Uganda Football Associations) S.C. Villa
23	MF	Francis Olaki	11 June 1995 (aged 20)	(Federation of Uganda Football Associations) Soana FC

=== Zambia ===
No.	Pos.	Player	Date of birth (age)	Club
1	GK	Jacob Banda	11 February 1988 (aged 27)	(Football Association of Zambia) ZESCO United F.C.
2	DF	Solomon Sakala	28 April 1997 (aged 18)	(Football Association of Zambia) Kabwe Warriors
3	DF	Stephen Kabamba	25 December 1990 (aged 25)	(Football Association of Zambia) Green Buffaloes F.C.
4	DF	Christopher Munthali	8 October 1991 (aged 24)	(Football Association of Zambia) Nkana F.C.
5	DF	Buchizya Mfune	11 October 1979 (aged 36)	(Football Association of Zambia) Green Buffaloes F.C.
6	DF	Donashano Malama	1 September 1991 (aged 24)	(Football Association of Zambia) Nkana F.C.
7	FW	Spencer Sautu	10 March 1996 (aged 19)	(Football Association of Zambia) Red Arrows F.C.
8	MF	Isaac Chansa	23 March 1984 (aged 31)	(Football Association of Zambia) Zanaco F.C.
9	FW	Conlyde Luchanga	11 March 1997 (aged 18)	(Football Association of Zambia) Lusaka Dynamos F.C.
10	MF	Mwelwa Mwape	3 June 1986 (aged 29)	(Football Association of Zambia) ZESCO United F.C.
11	FW	Christopher Katongo	31 August 1982 (aged 33)	(Football Association of Zambia) Green Buffaloes F.C.
12	DF	Benson Sakala	12 September 1996 (aged 19)	(Football Association of Zambia) Red Arrows F.C.
13	DF	Adrian Chama	18 March 1989 (aged 26)	(Football Association of Zambia) Green Buffaloes F.C.
14	MF	Jackson Chirwa	11 June 1995 (aged 20)	(Football Association of Zambia) Green Buffaloes F.C.
15	DF	George Chilufya	23 November 1986 (aged 29)	(Football Association of Zambia) Zanaco F.C.
16	GK	Tresford Mulenga	21 August 1998 (aged 17)	(Football Association of Zambia) Kabwe Warriors
17	MF	Clatous Chama	18 June 1991 (aged 24)	(Football Association of Zambia) ZESCO United F.C.
18	FW	Adamson Mulao	23 January 1989 (aged 26)	(Football Association of Zambia) Green Eagles
19	MF	Mwila Phiri	29 August 1994 (aged 21)	(Football Association of Zambia) Green Eagles
20	FW	Patson Daka	9 October 1998 (aged 17)	(Football Association of Zambia) Nchanga Rangers F.C.
21	DF	Daut Musekwa	1 April 1988 (aged 27)	(Football Association of Zambia) ZESCO United F.C.
22	GK	Raja Kola	7 April 1987 (aged 28)	(Football Association of Zambia) Zanaco F.C.
23	MF	Salulani Phiri	10 April 1994 (aged 21)	(Football Association of Zambia) Zanaco F.C.
