= Soccer Star of the Year =

Award from Zimbabwean soccer journalists

The Soccer Star of the Year is an annual association football award given to the player who is adjudged to have been the best performer of the season in Zimbabwean football.

Typically 11 players are nominated as the Soccer Stars of the Year, this honour comes with a publication of a Calendar, sponsored by Castle Beer, in which the 11 appear. It is not a 'fantasy team' as such, and the 11 nominees could theoretically all be in the same position – though this of course is unlikely. From this XI, a Soccer Star of the Year is selected, with 2 Runners Up also being announced.

It was first presented at the end of the 1969 Rhodesian football season, when it was founded as the Rhodesian Soccer Star of the Year; the name changed in 1980. Each year's winner is chosen at the end of the season by a vote amongst football writers from around Zimbabwe. The 2010 winner was Charles Sibanda, who won the award while playing for Motor Action. He is the second Motor Action player to have received the award after 2006 winner Clemence Matawu.

The first winner of the award was George Shaya, who played for Dynamos and won the award five times in all; in 1969, 1972 and three times in a row from 1975 to 1977. There are two other multiple-time winners: Peter Ndlovu of Highlanders won twice consecutively in 1990 and 1991, and Stanley Ndunduma won in 1981 and 1985, playing first for CAPS United and later for Black Rhinos. Malawian midfielder Joseph Kamwendo is the lone foreign player to have won the award, having done so in 2005 while playing for CAPS United.

== Winners ==
Season	Player	Player's nation	Club	Notes
1969	George Shaya (1)	Rhodesia	Dynamos	
1970	Tendai Chieza (1)	Rhodesia	Mangula	
1971	Peter Nyama (1)	Rhodesia	Chibuku Shumba	
1972	George Shaya (2)	Rhodesia	Dynamos	
1973	Ernest Kamba (1)	Rhodesia	Dynamos	
1974	Moses Moyo (1)	Rhodesia	Zimbabwe Saints	
1975	George Shaya (3)	Rhodesia	Dynamos	
1976	George Shaya (4)	Rhodesia	Dynamos	
1977	George Shaya (5)	Rhodesia	Dynamos	
1978	George Rollo (1)	Rhodesia	Arcadia United	
1979	Shacky Tauro (1)	Zimbabwe Rhodesia	CAPS United	(Note: Rhodesia became Zimbabwe Rhodesia on 1 June 1979.)
1980	David Mandigora (1)	Zimbabwe	Dynamos	(Note: The internationally recognised country of Zimbabwe became independent on 18 April 1980.)
1981	Stanley Ndunduma (1)	Zimbabwe	CAPS United	
1982	Japhet Mparutsa (1)	Zimbabwe	Dynamos	
1983	Ephert Lungu (1)	Zimbabwe	Rio Tinto	
1984	James Takavada (1)	Zimbabwe	Zisco Steel	
1985	Stanley Ndunduma (2)	Zimbabwe	Black Rhinos	
1986	Moses Chunga (1)	Zimbabwe	Dynamos	
1987	Mercedes Sibanda (1)	Zimbabwe	Highlanders	
1988	Ephraim Chawanda (1)	Zimbabwe	Zimbabwe Saints	
1989	Masimba Dinyero (1)	Zimbabwe	Black Mambas	
1990	Peter Ndlovu (1)	Zimbabwe	Highlanders	(Note: Joint winners)
1990	George Nechironga (1)	Zimbabwe	CAPS United	
1991	Peter Ndlovu (2)	Zimbabwe	Highlanders	
1992	Wilfred Mugeyi (1)	Zimbabwe	Black Aces	
1993	Agent Sawu (1)	Zimbabwe	Zimbabwe Saints	
1994	Memory Mucherahowa (1)	Zimbabwe	Dynamos	
1995	Tauya Murewa (1)	Zimbabwe	Dynamos	
1996	Stewart Murisa (1)	Zimbabwe	CAPS United	
1997	Walter Chuma (1)	Zimbabwe	Wankie (Note: Changed name to Hwange in 2005. Wankie had been the name of the town of Hwange until 1982, when numerous Zimbabwean place names were changed. Several sports teams named after towns or other geographical features, like Wankie F.C., retained their original names. Some renamed themselves at later dates but others, such as Shabanie Mine (from Zvishavane, Shabani until 1982) and FC Victoria (from Masvingo, formerly Fort Victoria) retain the old names to the present day.)	
1998–99	–	–	–	(Note: No award; controversy during the selection process led to the abandonment of the presentation after the 1998–99 season.)
2000	Zenzo Moyo (1)	Zimbabwe	Highlanders	
2001	Maxwell Dube (1)	Zimbabwe	Chapungu United	
2002	Dazzy Kapenya (1)	Zimbabwe	Highlanders	
2003	Energy Murambadoro (1)	Zimbabwe	CAPS United	
2004	Cephas Chimedza (1)	Zimbabwe	CAPS United	
2005	Joseph Kamwendo (1)	Malawi	CAPS United	(Note: First foreign winner)
2006	Clemence Matawu (1)	Zimbabwe	Motor Action	
2007	Murape Murape (1)	Zimbabwe	Dynamos	
2008	Evans Chikwaikwai (1)	Zimbabwe	Njube Sundowns	
2009	Ramson Zhuwawo (1)	Zimbabwe	Gunners	
2010	Charles Sibanda (1)	Zimbabwe	Motor Action	
2011	Washington Arubi (1)	Zimbabwe	Dynamos	
2012	Denver Mukamba (1)	Zimbabwe	Dynamos	
2013	Tawanda Muparati (1)	Zimbabwe	Dynamos	
2014	Dennis Dauda (1)	Zimbabwe	ZPC Kariba	
2015	Danny Phiri (1)	Zimbabwe	Chicken Inn	
2016	Hardlife Zvirekwi (1)	Zimbabwe	CAPS United	
2017	Rodwell Chinyengetere (1)	Zimbabwe	F.C. Platinum	
2018	Rodwell Chinyengetere (2)	Zimbabwe	F.C. Platinum	
2019	Joel Ngodzo (1)	Zimbabwe	CAPS United	
2021–22	Walter Musona (1)	Zimbabwe	F.C. Platinum	
2023	Qadr Amini (1)	Zimbabwe	Ngezi Platinum Stars	
2024	Walter Musona (2)	Zimbabwe	Simba Bhora	
2025	Washington Navaya (1)	Zimbabwe	TelOne	

== Notes and references ==
Notes

Sources

- Bwalya, Kalusha (29 January 2011). "2010 Soccer star finally crowned". The Zimbabwean. Harare.
- Matongorere, Nigel (24 July 2010). "Shaya lands support for Ndlovu". The Standard. Harare. Archived from the original on 18 May 2012.
- Nkiwane, Brian (23 October 2011). "Zulu – 11-Time Soccer Star Finalist". The Standard. Harare.
- Novak, Andrew (5–6 March 2010). "State, Society, and the Olympic Games in Rhodesia: Domestic and International Responses". Sports in Africa: Politics and Globalization. Athens, Ohio: Ohio University.
- Stokkermans, Karel (10 December 2005). "Zimbabwe – Player of the Year". Rec.Sport.Soccer Statistics Foundation.
- "Murape Murape wins Soccer Star of the Year award". NewZimbabwe.com. Harare. 11 December 2009. Archived from the original on 16 December 2007.
