= 2017 Africa Cup of Nations Group B =

Football tournament group stage

Group B of the 2017 Africa Cup of Nations was played from 15 to 23 January 2017 in Gabon. The group consisted of Algeria, Tunisia, Senegal and Zimbabwe.

Senegal and Tunisia advanced to the round of 16 as the top two teams.

== Teams ==
Draw position	Team	Method of qualification	Date of qualification	Finals appearance	Last appearance	Previous best performance	CAF Rankings Points (Note: The CAF rankings were used for seeding for the final draw.)	FIFA Rankings Start of event
B1	Algeria	Group J winners	2 June 2016	16th	2015	Winners (1990)	43.5	39
B2	Tunisia	Group A winners	4 September 2016	17th	2015	Winners (2004)	34.5	36
B3	Senegal	Group K winners	4 June 2016	13th	2015	Runners-up (2002)	24	33
B4	Zimbabwe	Group L winners	5 June 2016	3rd	2006	Group stage (2004, 2006)	10	103

== Standings ==
Pos	Team	Pld	W	D	L	GF	GA	GD	Pts	Qualification
1	Senegal	3	2	1	0	6	2	+4	7	Advance to knockout stage
2	Tunisia	3	2	0	1	6	5	+1	6	Advance to knockout stage
3	Algeria	3	0	2	1	5	6	−1	2	
4	Zimbabwe	3	0	1	2	4	8	−4	1	

Source: CAF
Rules for classification: Group stage tiebreakers

In the quarter-finals:

- The group winners, Senegal, advanced to play the runners-up of Group A, Cameroon.
- The group runners-up, Tunisia, advanced to play the winners of Group A, Burkina Faso.

== Matches ==
All times are local, WAT (UTC+1).

=== Algeria vs Zimbabwe ===
15 January 2017
17:00

Algeria	2–2	Zimbabwe
Mahrez 12', 82'	Report	Mahachi 17'; Mushekwi 29' (pen.)

Stade de Franceville, Franceville
Referee: Bamlak Tessema Weyesa (Ethiopia)

Algeria	Zimbabwe

GK	23	Raïs M'Bolhi
RB	20	Mokhtar Belkhiter	(yellow card) 28'	(substituted off) 46'
CB	2	Aïssa Mandi (c)
CB	21	Ramy Bensebaini
LB	3	Faouzi Ghoulam
RM	7	Riyad Mahrez
CM	17	Adlène Guedioura
CM	10	Nabil Bentaleb
LM	15	Hillal Soudani		(substituted off) 78'
AM	11	Yacine Brahimi
CF	13	Islam Slimani
Substitutions:
DF	22	Rabie Meftah		(substituted on) 46'
MF	18	Rachid Ghezzal		(substituted on) 78'
Manager:
(Belgium) Georges Leekens

GK	16	Tatenda Mkuruva
RB	4	Hardlife Zvirekwi
CB	5	Elisha Muroiwa
CB	2	Costa Nhamoinesu
LB	6	Onismor Bhasera
RM	10	Kudakwashe Mahachi
CM	14	Willard Katsande (c)
CM	3	Danny Phiri
LM	17	Knowledge Musona		(substituted off) 12'
AM	20	Khama Billiat
CF	9	Nyasha Mushekwi		(substituted off) 78'
Substitutions:
FW	7	Matthew Rusike	(yellow card) 38'	(substituted on) 12'
FW	13	Cuthbert Malajila		(substituted on) 78'
Manager:
Callisto Pasuwa

Man of the Match:
Riyad Mahrez (Algeria)

Assistant referees:
Jean-Claude Birumushahu (Burundi)
Aboubacar Doumbouya (Guinea)
Fourth official:
Denis Dembélé (Ivory Coast)

=== Tunisia vs Senegal ===
15 January 2017
20:00

Tunisia	0–2	Senegal
	Report	Mané 10' (pen.); Mbodji 30'

Stade de Franceville, Franceville
Referee: Sidi Alioum (Cameroon)

Tunisia	Senegal

GK	16	Aymen Mathlouthi (c)
RB	21	Hamdi Nagguez
CB	2	Syam Ben Youssef
CB	3	Aymen Abdennour	(yellow card) 9'
LB	12	Ali Maâloul
CM	15	Larry Azouni		(substituted off) 46'
CM	13	Ferjani Sassi
CM	8	Hamza Lahmar
RF	23	Naïm Sliti
CF	9	Ahmed Akaïchi		(substituted off) 64'
LF	7	Youssef Msakni
Substitutions:
MF	10	Wahbi Khazri		(substituted on) 46'
FW	11	Taha Yassine Khenissi		(substituted on) 64'
Manager:
(Poland) Henryk Kasperczak

GK	1	Abdoulaye Diallo
RB	21	Lamine Gassama
CB	2	Kara Mbodji
CB	3	Kalidou Koulibaly	(yellow card) 41'
LB	4	Cheikh M'Bengue	(yellow card) 36'
RM	17	Badou Ndiaye		(substituted off) 72'
CM	5	Idrissa Gueye
CM	8	Cheikhou Kouyaté (c)		(substituted off) 88'
LM	20	Keita Baldé		(substituted off) 62'
CF	9	Mame Biram Diouf
CF	10	Sadio Mané
Substitutions:
MF	18	Ismaïla Sarr		(substituted on) 62'
MF	22	Henri Saivet		(substituted on) 72'
MF	15	Papakouli Diop		(substituted on) 88'
Manager:
Aliou Cissé

Man of the Match:
Abdoulaye Diallo (Senegal)

Assistant referees:
Evarist Menkouandé (Cameroon)
Elvis Noupue (Cameroon)
Fourth official:
Mahamadou Keita (Mali)

=== Algeria vs Tunisia ===
19 January 2017
17:00

Algeria	1–2	Tunisia
Hanni 90+2'	Report	Mandi 50' (o.g.); Sliti 66' (pen.)

Stade de Franceville, Franceville
Referee: Bernard Camille (Seychelles)

Algeria	Tunisia

GK	16	Malik Asselah
RB	22	Rabie Meftah	(yellow card) 31'
CB	21	Ramy Bensebaini
CB	2	Aïssa Mandi (c)
LB	3	Faouzi Ghoulam	(yellow card) 65'
DM	17	Adlène Guedioura	(yellow card) 14'	(substituted off) 90+3'
CM	7	Riyad Mahrez
CM	10	Nabil Bentaleb
RW	11	Yacine Brahimi		(substituted off) 74'
LW	18	Rachid Ghezzal		(substituted off) 69'
CF	13	Islam Slimani
Substitutions:
FW	14	Baghdad Bounedjah		(substituted on) 69'
MF	9	Sofiane Hanni		(substituted on) 74'
MF	19	Mehdi Abeid		(substituted on) 90+3'
Manager:
(Belgium) Georges Leekens

GK	16	Aymen Mathlouthi (c)		(substituted off) 87'
RB	21	Hamdi Nagguez
CB	2	Syam Ben Youssef
CB	3	Aymen Abdennour
LB	12	Ali Maâloul	(yellow card) 45+1'
DM	13	Ferjani Sassi
RM	10	Wahbi Khazri		(substituted off) 73'
LM	14	Mohamed Amine Ben Amor
AM	23	Naïm Sliti
CF	7	Youssef Msakni
CF	9	Ahmed Akaïchi		(substituted off) 78'
Substitutions:
DF	20	Mohamed Ali Yacoubi		(substituted on) 73'
FW	11	Taha Yassine Khenissi		(substituted on) 78'
GK	1	Rami Jridi		(substituted on) 87'
Manager:
(Poland) Henryk Kasperczak

Man of the Match:
Youssef Msakni (Tunisia)

Assistant referees:
Abel Baba (Nigeria)
Mohammed Abdallah Ibrahim (Sudan)
Fourth official:
Ali Lemghaifry (Mauritania)

=== Senegal vs Zimbabwe ===
19 January 2017
20:00

Senegal	2–0	Zimbabwe
Mané 9'; Saivet 13'	Report

Stade de Franceville, Franceville
Referee: Redouane Jiyed (Morocco)

Senegal	Zimbabwe

GK	1	Abdoulaye Diallo
RB	21	Lamine Gassama	(yellow card) 57'
CB	3	Kalidou Koulibaly
CB	2	Kara Mbodji
LB	4	Cheikh M'Bengue
CM	5	Idrissa Gueye
CM	8	Cheikhou Kouyaté (c)	(yellow card) 31'	(substituted off) 85'
RW	20	Keita Baldé
AM	22	Henri Saivet
LW	10	Sadio Mané		(substituted off) 90+1'
CF	9	Mame Biram Diouf		(substituted off) 63'
Substitutions:
FW	7	Moussa Sow		(substituted on) 63'
MF	11	Cheikh N'Doye		(substituted on) 85'
MF	18	Ismaïla Sarr		(substituted on) 90+1'
Manager:
Aliou Cissé

GK	16	Tatenda Mkuruva
RB	4	Hardlife Zvirekwi
CB	5	Elisha Muroiwa
CB	2	Costa Nhamoinesu
LB	6	Onismor Bhasera
CM	18	Marvelous Nakamba
CM	14	Willard Katsande (c)
AM	20	Khama Billiat
RW	10	Kudakwashe Mahachi		(substituted off) 46'
LW	7	Matthew Rusike		(substituted off) 46'
CF	9	Nyasha Mushekwi		(substituted off) 83'
Substitutions:
FW	11	Tendai Ndoro		(substituted on) 46'
FW	8	Evans Rusike		(substituted on) 46'
FW	13	Cuthbert Malajila	(yellow card) 89'	(substituted on) 83'
Manager:
Callisto Pasuwa

Man of the Match:
Cheikhou Kouyaté (Senegal)

Assistant referees:
Redouane Achik (Morocco)
Ali Waleed Ahmed (Sudan)
Fourth official:
Gehad Grisha (Egypt)

=== Senegal vs Algeria ===
23 January 2017
20:00

Senegal	2–2	Algeria
Diop 43'; Sow 53'	Report	Slimani 10', 52'

Stade de Franceville, Franceville
Referee: Joshua Bondo (Botswana)

Senegal	Algeria

GK	16	Khadim N'Diaye
RB	14	Zargo Touré
CB	2	Kara Mbodji (c)		(substituted off) 70'
CB	11	Cheikh N'Doye
LB	19	Saliou Ciss
CM	17	Badou Ndiaye		(substituted off) 78'
CM	15	Papakouli Diop
AM	12	Mohamed Diamé
RW	18	Ismaïla Sarr
LW	13	Moussa Konaté		(substituted off) 90+4'
CF	7	Moussa Sow
Substitutions:
FW	6	Famara Diédhiou	(yellow card) 74'	(substituted on) 70'
MF	5	Idrissa Gueye		(substituted on) 78'
MF	20	Keita Baldé		(substituted on) 90+4'
Manager:
Aliou Cissé

GK	16	Malik Asselah
RB	22	Rabie Meftah
CB	2	Aïssa Mandi (c)
CB	4	Liassine Cadamuro	(yellow card) 58'
LB	3	Faouzi Ghoulam	(yellow card) 39'
CM	17	Adlène Guedioura
CM	10	Nabil Bentaleb	(yellow card) 39'
RW	11	Yacine Brahimi	(yellow card) 44'
AM	9	Sofiane Hanni		(substituted off) 83'
LW	7	Riyad Mahrez
CF	13	Islam Slimani		(substituted off) 80'
Substitutions:
FW	14	Baghdad Bounedjah		(substituted on) 80'
MF	18	Rachid Ghezzal		(substituted on) 83'
Manager:
(Belgium) Georges Leekens

Man of the Match:
Islam Slimani (Algeria)

Assistant referees:
Jerson Emiliano Dos Santos (Angola)
Arsénio Chadreque Marengula (Mozambique)
Fourth official:
Redouane Jiyed (Morocco)

=== Zimbabwe vs Tunisia ===
23 January 2017
20:00

Zimbabwe	2–4	Tunisia
Musona 42'; Ndoro 58'	Report	Sliti 9'; Msakni 22'; Khenissi 36'; Khazri 45' (pen.)

Stade de l'Amitié, Libreville
Referee: Denis Dembélé (Ivory Coast)

Zimbabwe	Tunisia

GK	16	Tatenda Mkuruva
RB	4	Hardlife Zvirekwi
CB	5	Elisha Muroiwa
CB	2	Costa Nhamoinesu	(yellow card) 44'
LB	6	Onismor Bhasera
CM	3	Danny Phiri	(yellow card) 8'	(substituted off) 89'
CM	14	Willard Katsande (c)
RW	20	Khama Billiat
AM	18	Marvelous Nakamba
LW	17	Knowledge Musona		(substituted off) 89'
CF	9	Nyasha Mushekwi
Substitutions:
FW	11	Tendai Ndoro		(substituted on) 46'
MF	10	Kudakwashe Mahachi		(substituted on) 89'
Manager:
Callisto Pasuwa

GK	1	Rami Jridi
RB	21	Hamdi Nagguez	(yellow card) 85'
CB	2	Syam Ben Youssef
CB	3	Aymen Abdennour (c)
LB	12	Ali Maâloul
CM	14	Mohamed Amine Ben Amor	(yellow card) 33'
CM	13	Ferjani Sassi
AM	10	Wahbi Khazri		(substituted off) 63'
RF	11	Taha Yassine Khenissi
CF	7	Youssef Msakni		(substituted off) 78'
LF	23	Naïm Sliti		(substituted off) 83'
Substitutions:
MF	8	Hamza Lahmar		(substituted on) 63'
FW	19	Saber Khalifa		(substituted on) 78'
MF	15	Larry Azouni		(substituted on) 83'
Manager:
(Poland) Henryk Kasperczak

Man of the Match:
Taha Yassine Khenissi (Tunisia)

Assistant referees:
Marius Donatien Tan (Ivory Coast)
Olivier Safari Kabene (DR Congo)
Fourth official:
Mahamadou Keita (Mali)
