= Mercedes Sibanda =

Zimbabwean association football player (1966–2002)

Personal information
- Full name: Mercedes Nkila Sibanda
- Date of birth: 4 February 1966
- Place of birth: Bulawayo, Rhodesia
- Date of death: 3 September 2002 (aged 36)
- Place of death: Bulawayo, Zimbabwe
- Position: Right back

Youth career
- 1981–1984: Highlanders

Senior career*
Years	Team	Apps	(Gls)
1985–1999	Highlanders		
1999	Blackpool		

International career
- Zimbabwe U20
1986–1998	Zimbabwe	53	(2)
- * Club domestic league appearances and goals

Mercedes Nkila Sibanda (4 February 1966 – 3 September 2002) was a Zimbabwean footballer who played as a right back for the Zimbabwe national team. He was considered one of the best right backs to ever play for Highlanders and the Zimbabwe national team, and one of the best African right backs during his playing days.

== Career ==
=== Club career ===
Sibanda was named the Zimbabwe Soccer Star of the Year in 1987, having been a runner-up previously in 1986. Two years later, he had a brief trial at Randers FC in Denmark, alongside teammate Rahman Gumbo, but were both reportedly dropped for their lack of discipline. In 1991, Sibanda nearly signed for South African club Mamelodi Sundowns, but failed a medical.

Sibanda retired in 1999, but came out of retirement for six months to play for Blackpool.

=== International career ===
Sibanda made 53 appearances for the Zimbabwe national team, scoring two goals.

== Personal life ==
During his playing career, Sibanda gained the nickname "Rambo", named after the character played by Sylvester Stallone, because of his muscular calves and biceps.

Sibanda was reported to have been ill in 2000, and died in Bulawayo on 3 September 2002, at the age of 36. He is survived by his four children. In 2021, a new tombstone for Sibanda was unveiled.

He was the cousin of former Zimbabwean international footballer Willard Khumalo.

== Career statistics ==
Scores and results list Zimbabwe's goal tally first, score column indicates score after each Sibanda goal.

List of international goals scored by Mercedes Sibanda
No.	Date	Venue	Opponent	Score	Result	Competition
1	13 November 1988	Kamuzu Stadium, Blantyre, Malawi	Ethiopia	?	2–1	1988 CECAFA Cup
2	22 November 1995	Loftus Versfeld Stadium, Pretoria, South Africa	Egypt	1–1	2–2	Friendly
