= Ngodzo =

Ngodzo is a Zimbabwean surname. Notable people with the surname include:

- Johannes Ngodzo, a Zimbabwean footballer
- Zephaniah Ngodzo, a Zimbabwean footballer
