= Melusi Ndebele =

Zimbabwean footballer (born 1978)

Personal information
- Date of birth: 17 October 1978 (age 48)
- Position: Defender

Senior career*
Years	Team	Apps	(Gls)
–2001	Highlanders F.C.		
2002	Zimbabwe Saints F.C.		
2003	CAPS United F.C.		

International career
1998–2000	Zimbabwe	2	(0)
- * Club domestic league appearances and goals

Melusi Ndebele (born 17 October 1978) is a retired Zimbabwean football defender.
