= 2021–22 Zimbabwe Premier Soccer League =

Zimbabwe Premier Soccer League
- Season: 2021–22
- Champions: Platinum
- Relegated: Harare City; Bulawayo City; Tenax; Wha Wha
- Matches: 306
- Goals: 594 (1.94 per match)
- Top goalscorer: William Madondo (CAPS United, 17 goals)
- Average attendance: 220,756 spectators over 306 matches average 721 each.

The 2021–22 Zimbabwe Premier Soccer League was the 41st season of the Zimbabwe Premier Soccer League, the top-tier football league in Zimbabwe, and the first following the cancellation of the 2020–21 season due to COVID.

Platinum won their fourth consecutive title with four rounds to play in the season after losses by runners up Chicken Inn and third-placed Dynamos.

Platinum forward Walter Musonga was named the 2022 Soccer Star of the Year, while CAPS United's William Madondo won the leading scorer award with 17 goals.

== Changes from 2019 ==
Wha Wha, Bulawayo City, Cranborne Bullets, and Tenax were promoted from the 2019 Division One.

== League table ==
Pos	Team	Pld	W	D	L	GF	GA	GD	Pts	Qualification or relegation
1	FC Platinum (C)	34	22	9	3	52	14	+38	75	Champions
2	Chicken Inn	34	18	9	7	42	28	+14	63	
3	Dynamos	34	16	10	8	33	17	+16	58	
4	Ngezi Platinum	34	14	13	7	46	19	+27	55	
5	Highlanders	34	12	15	7	44	32	+12	51	
6	Triangle United	34	13	11	10	39	31	+8	50	
7	Bulawayo Chiefs	34	13	10	11	32	28	+4	49	
8	Herentals	34	12	12	10	33	30	+3	48	
9	Black Rhinos	34	10	16	8	35	30	+5	46	
10	Manica Diamonds	34	10	15	9	31	28	+3	45	
11	CAPS United	34	9	13	12	35	42	−7	40	
12	Kariba	34	9	12	13	23	29	−6	39	
13	Cranborne Bullets	34	10	8	16	30	43	−13	38	
14	Yadah Stars	34	8	13	13	24	31	−7	37	
15	Harare City (R)	34	7	14	13	24	32	−8	35	Relegation
16	Bulawayo City (R)	34	9	7	18	24	42	−18	34	Relegation
17	Tenax (R)	34	7	9	18	19	55	−36	30	Relegation
18	Wha Wha (R)	34	6	6	22	28	63	−35	24	Relegation

Source: soccerway.com
Rules for classification: 1) points; 2) goal difference; 3) number of goals scored.
(C) Champions; (R) Relegated
