= Callisto Pasuwa =

Zimbabwean soccer coach

Callisto Pasuwa is a Zimbabwean soccer coach who is currently the coach of Malawi National Soccer Team. He is also former coach of Big Bullets FC and also former coach of Dynamos Football Club. Pasuwa led Dynamos to four consecutive league titles as coach from 2011 to 2014 writing his own piece of history.

== Background ==
Callisto Pasuwa (referred to as Kallisto in certain sections of the media), was born on 20 June 1970 in Mutare. He attended Mutare Boys High where he finished in 1990. Pasuwa is married.

== Playing career ==
=== Club ===
Pasuwa is a former Dynamos player. He was part of the history making Dembare outfit that played in the African Champions league. He also won several league titles with the club. He also played alongside other Dembare legends such as Memory Mucherahowa, Stewart Murisa and Tauya Murehwa. During his playing days, Pasuwa was known for his midfield artistry and dribbling skills. He was also known for scoring goals occasionally.

== Coaching career ==
=== Club ===
While Pasuwa was the coach at Dembare (a nickname for Dynamos F.C.), he also doubled as the national team assistant coach. It was however at Dembare that Pasuwa carved his name in the country's history books when he won four consecutive league titles. Many had expressed skepticism over Pasuwa's capacity to coach a well decorated outfit such as Dynamos after having taken over from Lloyd Mutasa whom he had been deputising. Pasuwa silenced his critics with four deserved league titles on the trot including other trophies such as the Mbada Diamonds Cup, Gushungo Victory Cup and the Bob 90 Cup. During his successful stint at Dynamos, Pasuwa won 12 trophies which include four league titles, a record only him holds.

=== National team ===
Pasuwa's coaching career with the national team both the under 23 and the senior side has been nothing short of exceptional. Despite a series of poor training facilities and planning on the part of ZIFA, Pasuwa has produced very impressive results. In an AFCON 2017 qualifier played against the flames of Malawi, the team traveled by bus after having trained as a unit for only a day but upset Malawi 2–1 on their home turf. He also followed the triumph of Malawi with another victory at Rufaro Stadium against the Comoros Islands in a CHAN qualifier. Pasuwa's appointment as senior national team coach had been after he had secured the qualification of the under 23 side to play in the All Africa Games after dispatching continental powerhouses, Cameroon.[2] Following a series of broken promises by ZIFA to Callisto Pasuwa, he walked away from his job in mid 2015 just days before a crucial match with South Africa effectively throwing the country's hopes of partaking in the Olympics into doubt.

Despite ZIFA getting money amounting to US 1 million, they had not paid Pasuwa a cent, resulting in the coach quitting his job at the eleventh hour. He later returned to his job leading Zimbabwe to a third AFCON qualification after beating Malawi 3–0 at home, leading the country to qualification with a game to spare for the first time.

== Awards ==
- 2011 Zimbabwe Premier Soccer League Winners Medal
- 2012 Zimbabwe Premier Soccer League Winners Medal
- 2013 Zimbabwe Premier Soccer League Winners Medal
- 2014 Zimbabwe Premier Soccer League Winners Medal
- 2012 Coach of the Year
- Mbada Diamonds Cup
- Bob @ 89 Challenge Cup
- 2017 AFCON qualification
