= Charles Sibanda =

Zimbabwean footballer (born 1985)

Personal information
- Full name: Charles Sibanda
- Date of birth: 30 March 1985 (age 41)
- Place of birth: Bulawayo, zimbabwe
- Position: Forward

Team information
- Current team: Bulawayo Chiefs

Senior career*
Years	Team	Apps	(Gls)
2008–2009	Hwange		
2009–2011	Motor Action		
2011–2014	Platinum		
2014–2015	Highlanders		
2015–2019	How Mine		
2020–	Bulawayo Chiefs		

International career^{‡}
2010–	Zimbabwe	11	(2)
- * Club domestic league appearances and goals as of 27 June 2016 ‡ National team caps and goals as of 27 June 2016

Charles Sibanda (born 30 March 1985) is a Zimbabwean professional footballer, who plays as a forward for Bulawayo Chiefs and the Zimbabwe national team.

== Career ==
=== Club ===
Hwange were Sibanda's first club, he stayed with the club for one year before departing to join Motor Action. With Motor Action, Sibanda won the 2010 Zimbabwe Premier Soccer League title and subsequently won the 2010 Soccer Star of the Year award. Platinum became his third club in 2011 when he agreed to join the Zvishavane-based club, he remained there for three years. Moves to Highlanders and How Mine have since followed. In 2015, Sibanda was involved in a serious car accident, he sustained injuries to his right shoulder, his right collar bone and one of his lungs. He has since made a full recovery.

=== International ===
In January 2014, coach Ian Gorowa, invited him to be a part of the Zimbabwe squad for the 2014 African Nations Championship. He helped the team to a fourth-place finish after being defeated by Nigeria by a goal to nil. Overall, Sibanda has played 11 times and scored 2 goals for Zimbabwe.

== Career statistics ==
=== International ===
As of 27 June 2016.

National team	Year	Apps	Goals
Zimbabwe	2010	1	0
Zimbabwe	2011	3	0
Zimbabwe	2012	1	1
Zimbabwe	2013	2	1
Zimbabwe	2014	4	0
Zimbabwe	2015	0	0
Zimbabwe	2016	0	0
Total		11	2

=== International goals ===
As of 27 June 2016. Scores and results list Zimbabwe's goal tally first.

Goal	Date	Venue	Opponent	Score	Result	Competition
1	17 July 2012	Molopolole Sports Complex, Molepolole, Botswana	Lesotho	5–3	5–3	Three Nations Tournament
2	24 August 2013	Levy Mwanawasa Stadium, Ndola, Zambia	Zambia	1–0	1–0	2014 African Nations Championship qualification

== Honours ==
=== Club ===
Motor Action

- Zimbabwe Premier Soccer League (1): 2010

Platinum

- Zimbabwean Independence Trophy (2): 2012, 2014
- Cup of Zimbabwe (1): 2014

=== Individual ===
- Soccer Star of the Year (1): 2010
