= Orji (given name) =

- Gender: Male
- Language(s): Igbo

Origin
- Word/name: Nigerian
- Meaning: strong, of the great orji tree

Orji is a given name meaning strong, of the great orji tree. Notable people with the name include:

- Orji Kalu (born 1992), Nigerian footballer
- Orji Uzor Kalu (born 1960), Nigerian politician and businessman
- Orji Okwonkwo (born 1998), Nigerian footballer

== See also ==
- Orji (surname)
