= Wha Wha F.C. =

Zimbabwean football club

Wha Wha FC
- Nickname: Chekerapasi Grassmower
- Ground: Ascot Stadium, Gweru
- League: Division One (II)
- 2021/22: ▼18th in Premier League

Wha Wha FC (sometimes spelt as WhaWha or HwaHwa) is a Zimbabwean football club based in Wha Wha on the outskirts of Gweru.

The club won promotion to the Zimbabwe Premier Soccer League in 2014 but then were relegated in 2015.

They were promoted again in 2019, competing in the COVID-affected 2021–22 Zimbabwe Premier Soccer League. They were relegated immediately, finishing bottom of the log.
