= Tymon Mabaleka =

Zimbabwean footballer and music producer (1950–2014)

Tymon Mabaleka (1950 – 27 June 2014) was a Zimbabwean footballer and music producer. He was nicknamed "The Whitehorse". His career spanned nearly twenty years in sports and another fifteen years in the music industry.

== Personal life ==
Mabaleka was born in Nswazi in Umzingwane District. He attended Longfield Primary School in Nswazi before relocating to Bulawayo, where he studied at Msitheli High School and Mzilikazi High School for his secondary education.

== Football ==
Mabaleka began his career at Eastlands Club before joining Highlanders Football Club in Bulawayo in 1973. That season, Highlanders won the Chibuku Trophy.

== Music ==
Mabaleka worked for Gallo Records at Shed Studios and was often referred to as Zimbabwe's Quincy Jones.

He produced Oliver Mtukudzi, James Chimombe, Lovemore Majaivana, Ilanga, Solomon S'kuza and the Fallen Heroes, Ebony Sheikh, The Frontline Kids, Shepherd Chinyani and the Vhuka Boys, Leonard Zhakata, John Chibadura, The Essentials, Kassongo Band and the Zimbabwe People's Band, as well as many others. He produced several songs for Lovemore Majaivana, including "Stimela", "Salanini Zinini", "Sono Sami Kuleliyani’zwe", "Dabuka Mhlaba", "Inyoni Bani", "Engelamathambo", "Mkhwenyana", "Bambulele uMajola".

Mabaleka also produced some tracks for Solomon Skuza, as well as Ebony Sheikh's "Emhlabeni Kunzima", Shepherd Chinyani and the Vhuka Boys' "Mai Vakakosha", and "Pakuyambuka" by Leonard Zhakata.

== Death ==
Mabaleka died in Harare, Zimbabwe from pneumonia , aged 64 or 65. He is survived by his wife, Josephine Mabaleka, and three children Zwelihle , Nqobile and Kholiwe and Zwelihles son Lusanda Mabaleka . He was buried in Bulawayo on 3 July 2014.
