= Ralph Matema =

Zimbabwean footballer (born 1982)

Personal information
- Full name: Ralph Ticharwa Matema
- Date of birth: 19 June 1982 (age 44)
- Place of birth: Bulawayo, Zimbabwe
- Position: Striker

Team information
- Current team: Yadah Stars

Youth career
- Dynamos

Senior career*
Years	Team	Apps	(Gls)
2003–2004	Kambuzuma FC		
2004–2007	Highlanders FC		
2007–2009	Orlando Pirates	4	(1)
2009–2014	Witbank Spurs		
2015–2017	Highlanders FC		
2018–	Yadah Stars		

International career^{‡}
2004–2007	Zimbabwe	6	(1)
- * Club domestic league appearances and goals as of 1 January 2022 ‡ National team caps and goals as of 1 January 2022

Ralph Matema (born 19 June 1982) is a Zimbabwean footballer. He has been a member of the Zimbabwe national football team.

"Raru", as he is popularly known, is the reigning top scorer of the Zimbabwean CBZ Premier League after netting 19 times in the 2006 season. In 2007, he scored 10 goals in 11 games but left Highlanders FC to join Orlando Pirates for the 2007/2008 season.
