= Pieter de Jongh =

Dutch footballer and manager

Personal information
- Full name: Hendrik Pieter de Jongh
- Date of birth: 8 December 1970 (age 55)
- Place of birth: Asperen, Netherlands

Managerial career
- Years: Team
- 1997–1999: VRC
- 1999–2000: Heerjansdam
- 2001–2004: De Zuidvogels
- 2005: RKSV Schijndel
- 2007: Vitesse Delft
- 2008–2009: SC Woerden
- 2011: ASV Dronten
- 2012: SDC Putten
- 2012–2013: Mongolia U23
- 2014–2015: Leopards
- 2015–2016: Cape Town
- 2016–2017: Ulaanbaatar City
- 2017–2018: Eswatini
- 2019: Highlanders
- 2020: Platinum
- 2022: Somalia
- 2023-2024: Silver Strikers
- 2025: Jwaneng Galaxy
- 2025: Highlanders

Hendrik Pieter de Jongh (born 8 December 1970) is a Dutch professional football manager.

He has coached clubs around the world including Budapest Honvéd, Cape Town and Ulaanbaatar City.

== Career ==
De Jongh was born in Asperen, Netherlands. He only played in amateur soccer.

De Jongh was beginning his managerial career at RKC Waalwijk as a youth coach, before becoming a youth coach for the Royal Dutch Football Association (KNVB). He moved on to manage vv VRC in Veenendaal, FC Dordrecht's reserve team and Vitesse Delft before becoming the trainee assistant coach in the youth academy of AZ in the Eredivisie. He then went to Hungary to become the academy director of Budapest Honvéd.

=== Budapest Honvéd ===
In December 2013 he signed his contract ready to commence duties as the new technical director for Budapest Budapest Honvéd. During his tenure, he strived to bring the Dutch philosophy to the academy.

=== A.F.C. Leopards ===
On 15 May 2014, Kenyan Premier League giants A.F.C. Leopards announced that De Jongh was set to take over at the club, subject to personal terms. He landed in Kenya and completed his move to the club on 17 May.

De Jongh's first match at the helm of Ingwe was a Nairobi derby league match against arch-rivals Gor Mahia. He guided his team to a 3–1 win, and after the match praised his team's spirit going into the game. One of his great achievements with the club was getting them to 2014 CECAFA Nile Basin Cup finals for the first time in history. Ugandan side Victoria University. but went ahead to receive the award for best runner up coach of the tournament.

Fans and management alike disagreed with his tactical methods and selections However, De Jongh said he was not worried about the fans because his method worked during the team's performances in the Nile Basin Cup, the derby win, and pulling the club up from last in the ranking to 6th. KPL Top 8 Cup .

On 28 December 2014, soon after the win over Bandari, club chairman Allan Kasavuli announced that De Jongh would no longer be working as head coach, in what he termed as a poor season that saw the team finish the 2014 season as 6th from last, with 32 points in 16 matches. He became the 14th coach to have his contract terminated without notice by the club in five years.

In January 2015, De Jongh returned to training with A.F.C. Leopards, claiming there was no prior notice before his dismissal and months of unpaid salary, a case he took forward to the sports tribunal and won a year later

=== F.C. Cape Town ===
After leaving F.C leopard he moved to South Africa where he joined F.C. Cape Town as their new head coach until later in the year.

=== Ulaanbaatar City F.C. ===
In 2016, he signed a 3-month contract at club Ulaanbaatar city F.C. in Mongolia's capital as its head coach He brought a breath of fresh air to football in Mongolia as he made structural changes that saw the club thrive even after he left.

=== Rwanda Football Federation ===
In 2016 De jongh was appointed the technical director of Rwanda Football Federation He worked to improve football in Rwanda from grassroot. Organizing country wide scouting for young talent that He also worked to improve women's football, taking part in grass root festival and working closely with the head coach of the women's national team. He resigned citing unprofessionalism.

=== Swaziland National team ===
In 2017 he signed as the head coach of Eswatini national football team of Swaziland. After the assassination of the vice chairman Mr. Victor Gamedze who was one of the few that supported his vision, he decided to leave the team at 124 in the ranking from 142.

=== Highlanders F.C ===
In 2019 he took over the managerial position at Highlanders F.C. He led Highlanders F.C. to victory in the 2019 Chibuku Super Cup Final (30 November 2019) over Ngezi Platinum Stars with 16 unbeaten matches under his belt the club qualified for the CAF Confederations Cup. He also took home the coach of the month title

=== F.C. Platinum ===
He joined F.C. Platinum in January 2020. His first game was against Al Ahly SC in the champions league drawing 1-1 In March 2020 F.C. Platinum was set to play De Jongh's former team highlanders for the super challenge. His team won with a 2–0 victory.

=== Somalia ===
In February 2022, de Jongh was appointed manager of the Somalia national football team. On 22 May 2022, following a 5–1 Africa Cup of Nations qualification preliminary round loss against Eswatini on aggregate, de Jongh resigned from his role.

Malawi

In February 2022, De Jongh signed a two years contract with a Malawian Super League outfit Silver Strikers
