= Ramson Zhuwawo =

Zimbabwean footballer (born 1983)

Personal information
- Date of birth: 3 November 1983 (age 42)
- Place of birth: Harare, Zimbabwe
- Height: 1.74 m (5 ft 8 1/2 in)
- Position: Defensive midfielder

Youth career
- Eiffel Flats Kadoma

Senior career*
Years	Team	Apps	(Gls)
2005	Eiffel Flats Kadoma		
2006–2007	Dynamos FC		
2008–2010	Gunners F.C.		
2010–2013	AmaZulu F.C.	43	(1)
2014	Chicken Inn		

International career
2009–2011	Zimbabwe	4	(0)
- * Club domestic league appearances and goals as of 15 November 2012

Ramson Zhuwawo (born 3 November 1983 in Harare) is a retired Zimbabwean soccer player who among others played for AmaZulu in the South African Premier Soccer League.

== Career ==
He was named 2009 Zimbabwe Soccer Star of the Year.

== International career ==
Zhuwawo made his senior international debut for the Zimbabwe national football team at the 2009 COSAFA Cup.
