= Zephaniah Ngodzo =

Zimbabwean footballer (born 1985)

Personal information
- Date of birth: 25 January 1985 (age 41)
- Place of birth: Mpilo, Zimbabwe
- Height: 1.65 m (5 ft 5 in)
- Position: Defender

Team information
- Current team: Bulawayo City F.C.

Senior career*
Years	Team	Apps	(Gls)
2002–2010	Highlanders F.C.		
2011–2012	F.C. Platinum		
2013	Chicken Inn F.C.		
2014–2016	Bantu Rovers F.C.		
2017–	Bulawayo City F.C.		

International career
2006–2010	Zimbabwe	11	(0)
- * Club domestic league appearances and goals

Zephaniah Ngodzo (born 25 January 1985) is a Zimbabwean football defender who currently plays for Bulawayo City F.C.
