= Thabo Senong =

South African football manager (born 1980)

Personal information
- Date of birth: 15 September 1980 (age 46)
- Place of birth: Pimville, Soweto, South Africa

Team information
- Current team: Singida Fountain Gate (assistant coach)

Managerial career
- Years: Team
- 2015–2019: South Africa U20
- 2019–2021: Lesotho
- 2021–2022: Sekhukhune United (assistant)
- 2022–2023: Sekhukhune United (academy)
- 2023–?: Singida Fountain Gate (assistant)
- 2026–2026: Highlanders
Medal record
Men's football
Representing South Africa (as manager)
Africa U-20 Cup of Nations
Bronze medal – third place	2019

Thabo Senong (born 15 September 1980) is a South African football manager. He was most recently coach of Zimbabwean club Highlanders.

In August 2019, he was appointed as manager of the Lesotho national football team.

Prior to his appointment, Senong was coach of the South Africa national U-20 team, known as the Amajitas. He coached at the 2017 Africa U-20 Cup of Nations, 2017 FIFA U-20 World Cup, 2019 Africa U-20 Cup of Nations and 2019 FIFA U-20 World Cup.

He won the COSAFA U-20 Cup with the Amajitas in 2017.
