= Orji (surname) =

Orji is a surname. Notable people with the surname include:

- Alex Orji (born 2003), American football player
- Anfernee Orji (born 2000), American football player
- Ebere Orji (born 1992), Nigerian footballer
- Felix Orji (born 1962), Nigerian-American Anglican bishop
- Joseph Orji (born 1954), Nigerian military governor
- Josephine Orji (born 1979), Nigerian powerlifter
- Keturah Orji (born 1996), American track and field athlete
- Penn Orji (born 1991), Nigerian footballer
- Theodore Orji (born 1950), Nigerian politician
- Yvonne Orji (born 1983), Nigerian-American actress
- Zack Orji (born 1960s), Nigerian actor, director, producer and filmmaker

== See also ==
- Orji (given name)
