= George Shaya =

Rhodesian footballer (1946–2021)

Personal information
- Full name: George 'Mastermind' Shaya
- Date of birth: 30 October 1946 (age 80)
- Place of birth: Rhodesia (now Zimbabwe)
- Date of death: 24 August 2021
- Position: Forward

Senior career*
Years	Team	Apps	(Gls)
- Dynamos

International career
- Rhodesia
- * Club domestic league appearances and goals

George Shaya (30 October 1946 – 24 August 2021) was a former association football forward who played firstly for Saint Pauls Musami and later for Dynamos and the Rhodesian national team during the 1960s and 1970s. He was considered one of Dynamos' all-time finest players, as well as one of the best ever from present-day Zimbabwe.

Consistently performing well at club level, Shaya was named Rhodesian Soccer Star of the Year a record five times, including the inaugural award in 1969. He was also part of the Rhodesia side which unsuccessfully attempted to qualify for the 1970 FIFA World Cup in 1969.
