= Moses Chunga =

Zimbabwean footballer (born 1965)

Personal information
- Full name: Moses Chunga
- Date of birth: 17 October 1965 (age 61)
- Place of birth: Salisbury, Rhodesia (now Harare, Zimbabwe)
- Position: Midfielder

Senior career*
Years	Team	Apps	(Gls)
1983–1988	Dynamos		
1988–1992	Eendracht Aalst		

International career
1987–1991	Zimbabwe		

Managerial career
- Dynamos
- Shabanie Mine
- Gunners
- 2010: Shooting Stars
- 2010–2011: CAPS United
- 2011–2012: Gunners
- 2014–2015: Buffaloes F.C.
- 2016: Harare City F.C.
- * Club domestic league appearances and goals

Moses Chunga (born 17 October 1965) is a retired Zimbabwean footballer who played as a midfielder for Dynamos, Eendracht Aalst and the Zimbabwe national football team. He was born to parents of Malawian descent, but chose to represent his nation of birth at international level. He is considered to be one of Zimbabwe's greatest ever midfielders.

== Coaching career ==
In 2002, following a spell in charge at Dynamos, he was appointed head coach of Shabanie Mine.

Chunga won his first managerial honours with Gunners F.C., who became Zimbabwe Premier League champions in 2009. He subsequently left the Gunners before the start of the following season and joined fellow Harare-side Shooting Stars.

In June 2011, CAPS United announced that Moses Chunga had left the club, a day after his team was knocked out of the quarter-finals of the BancABC Sup8r by Highlanders. He was re-appointed as coach at Gunners F.C. a few weeks later.

In December 2012, Chunga revisited Aalst and was honoured by his old club and by the City Council, being invited to sign the Golden Book of Aalst, the community's highest civic honour.

On 11 March 2015, Chunga quit Buffaloes F.C.
