= Jean Mousté =

Guinean footballer

Personal information
- Date of birth: 2 January 1994 (age 32)
- Place of birth: Fria, Guinea
- Height: 1.80 m (5 ft 11 in)
- Position: Midfielder

Team information
- Current team: Al-Diwaniya

Senior career*
Years	Team	Apps	(Gls)
2013	Athlético Coléah		
2013–2021	Hafia		
2021–present	Al-Diwanya		

International career^{‡}
2015–	Guinea	19	(0)
- * Club domestic league appearances and goals as of 00:11, 26 March 2021 (UTC) ‡ National team caps and goals as of 00:11, 26 March 2021 (UTC)

Jean Mousté (born 2 January 1994) is a Guinean footballer who plays as a midfielder for Al-Diwaniya and the Guinea national team.

== International career ==
Mousté made his debut with the Guinea national team in a 3–1 2016 African Nations Championship win over Liberia on 22 June 2015.
