= Blackpool F.C. (Harare) =

Association football club in Zimbabwe

Blackpool Football Club was an association football club based in Harare, Zimbabwe.

== History ==
Blackpool F.C. competed in the Zimbabwean top flight.
