= Evans Chikwaikwai =

Zimbabwean footballer (born 1985)

Personal information
- Date of birth: 14 August 1985 (age 41)
- Place of birth: Rusape, Zimbabwe
- Height: 1.68 m (5 ft 6 in)
- Position: Striker

Senior career*
Years	Team	Apps	(Gls)
2004–2007	Grain Tigers		
2007–2009	Njube Sundowns	41	(36)
2009–2010	Bidvest Wits	10	(0)
2010–2010	→ Liga Muçulmana de Maputo (loan)		
2010–2011	→ Hanover Park (loan)		
2011	CD Costa do Sol		
2012–2014	Chicken Inn		
2015–2016	Dongo Sawmills		
2017–2018	Mutare City Rovers		

International career^{‡}
2008	Zimbabwe	3	(0)
- * Club domestic league appearances and goals as of 15 November 2020 ‡ National team caps and goals as of 15 November 2020

Evans Chikwaikwai (born 14 August 1985 in Rusape's Vengere Township) is a Zimbabwean footballer who has played as a striker for Bidvest Wits in the South African Premier Soccer League.

== Early life ==
Chikwaikwai attended Vengere Primary School from 1990 to 1997 and proceeded to Vengere High School for his 'O' levels. Chikwaikwai left Vengere to study at Mutare Boys High School on a sports scholarship. There, he became a key utility player for the school team.

== Career ==
Chikwaikwai played alongside his oldest brother Manyowa for Rusape side Grain Masters between 2000 and 2004 before coming to Harare for trials with premiership side CAPS United. The move was stalled when he sustained a career-threatening ankle injury during a training session. The former Njube Sundowns striker was named Zimbabwe's 2008/9 'Soccer Star of the Year' after he finished as the league's top goal-scorer with 23 goals in 28 games. He donated part of his prize money to Maggies Day Centre, an orphanage at his home area of Rusape. Bidvest Wits manager Roger de Sa described Chikwaikwai as "an exceptional striker". He also won the golden boot award.

On 17 February 2010, Chikwaikwai was loaned to Liga Muçulmana de Maputo in Mozambique until 30 June 2010. On 16 June 2011, Zimbabwe international and former Warriors forward Evans Chikwaikwai joined premiership newcomers Chicken Inn.
