= Bernard Muwanga =

Ugandan footballer (born 1993)

Personal information
- Date of birth: 25 August 1993 (age 33)
- Place of birth: Kampala, Uganda
- Positions: Centre back; defensive midfielder

Team information
- Current team: Proline

Senior career*
Years	Team	Apps	(Gls)
2013–2016	Bright Stars		
2016–2018	SC Villa		
2018–2019	Kampala CCA		
2019–	Proline		

International career^{‡}
2015–	Uganda	20	(0)
- * Club domestic league appearances and goals as of 13:10, 27 September 2018 (UTC) ‡ National team caps and goals as of 17:44, 8 March 2018 (UTC)

Bernard Muwanga (born 25 August 1993) is a Ugandan international footballer who plays for Proline FC, as a defender and midfielder

== Career ==
Born in Kampala, he has played club football for Bright Stars, SC Villa and Kampala Capital City Authority.

He made his international debut for Uganda in 2015.
