= Sekou Diarra =

Malian footballer

Personal information
- Date of birth: 27 July 1993 (age 33)
- Place of birth: Kita, Mali
- Height: 1.77 m (5 ft 9 1/2 in)
- Position: Right-back

Team information
- Current team: Onze Créateurs

Senior career*
Years	Team	Apps	(Gls)
2014–	Onze Créateurs		

International career^{‡}
2016–	Mali	9	(0)
- * Club domestic league appearances and goals as of 00:11, 26 March 2021 (UTC) ‡ National team caps and goals as of 00:11, 3 March 2022 (UTC)

Sekou Diarra (born 27 July 1993) is a Malian footballer who plays as a right-back for Onze Créateurs and the Mali national team.

== International career ==
Diarra made his professional debut with the Mali national team in a 2–2 2016 African Nations Championship tie with Uganda on 19 January 2016.
