= Danny Phiri =

Zimbabwean footballer (born 1989)

Personal information
- Full name: Danny Phiri
- Date of birth: 25 July 1989 (age 37)
- Place of birth: Norton, Zimbabwe
- Height: 1.74 m (5 ft 9 in)
- Position: Defensive midfielder

Team information
- Current team: Golden Arrows

Youth career
- Amazulu
- –2008: Railstars

Senior career*
Years	Team	Apps	(Gls)
2009–2010	Bantu Rovers		
2011–2016	Chicken Inn		
2016–2021	Golden Arrows	86	(3)

International career^{‡}
2014–2019	Zimbabwe	40	(2)
- * Club domestic league appearances and goals as of 12 November 2022 ‡ National team caps and goals as of 12 November 2022

Danny Phiri (born 25 July 1989) is a Zimbabwean professional footballer, who plays as a defensive midfielder for Golden Arrows and the Zimbabwe national team.

== Club career ==
Phiri's youth career included spells with the junior sides of Amazulu and Railstars. In 2009, Phiri made the move into senior football when he agreed to join Bantu Rovers. He stayed with Bantu for two years before joining Chicken Inn. In 2015, he and Chicken Inn won the Zimbabwe Premier Soccer League and Phiri subsequently won the Soccer Star of the Year award.

In April 2016, Phiri, along with teammates Tafadzwa Kutinyu and Moses Demera, left Zimbabwe to attend a trial at Lamontville Golden Arrows.

== International career ==
In January 2014, coach Ian Gorowa, invited him to be a part of the Zimbabwe squad for the 2014 African Nations Championship. He played in all six of Zimbabwe's matches and helped the team to a fourth-place finish after being defeated by Nigeria by 1–0. Since the 2014 African Nations Championship, Phiri has made a further seven appearances for his nation, with five of them coming in qualifying for the 2017 Africa Cup of Nations. He has scored twice.

== Career statistics ==
=== International ===
As of 17 July 2019.

National team	Year	Apps	Goals
Zimbabwe	2012	1	0
Zimbabwe	2013	2	0
Zimbabwe	2014	10	1
Zimbabwe	2015	9	1
Zimbabwe	2016	7	0
Zimbabwe	2017	4	0
Zimbabwe	2018	3	0
Zimbabwe	2019	4	0
Total		40	2

=== International goals ===
As of 19 June 2016. Scores and results list Zimbabwe's goal tally first.

Goal	Date	Venue	Opponent	Score	Result	Competition
1	1 June 2014	National Sports Stadium, Harare, Zimbabwe	Tanzania	1–0	2–2	2015 Africa Cup of Nations qualification
2	18 October 2015	Barbourfields Stadium, Bulawayo, Zimbabwe	Lesotho	3–1	3–1	2016 African Nations Championship qualification

== Honours ==
=== Individual ===
- Soccer Star of the Year: 2015
