= Stewart Murisa =

Zimbabwean footballer (born 1974)

Personal information
- Date of birth: 18 July 1974 (age 52)
- Position: Forward

Senior career*
Years	Team	Apps	(Gls)
1993–1997	CAPS United F.C.	115	(30)
1997–1999	AmaZulu F.C.		
1999	Ajax Cape Town F.C.	10	(1)
2000	Dynamos F.C.	18	(3)
2001–2002	Highlanders F.C.	9	(1)
2002–2004	Bidvest Wits F.C.	50	(4)

International career
1994–1998	Zimbabwe	8	(1)
- * Club domestic league appearances and goals

Stewart Murisa (born 18 July 1974) is a retired Zimbabwean football striker.
