= Memory Mucherahowa =

Zimbabwean footballer (born 1968)

Memory Mucherahowa (born 19 June 1968) is a Zimbabwean former footballer. He captained Dynamos F.C. to the 1998 CAF Champions League final and was named the 1994 Soccer Star of the Year.

In his 2017 autobiography he claimed that the national team used juju magic.
