= Mwape Mwelwa =

Zambian footballer (born 1986)

Personal information
- Date of birth: 3 June 1986 (age 40)
- Place of birth: Lusaka, Zambia
- Position: Midfielder

Team information
- Current team: Zesco United

Senior career*
| Years | Team | Apps | (Gls) |
| 2011–2012 | Red Arrows | | |
| 2013– | Zesco United | | |

International career^{‡}
| 2015–2016 | Zambia | 6 | (0) |
- * Club domestic league appearances and goals as of 1 August 2020 ‡ National team caps and goals as of 1 August 2020

Mwape Mwelwa (born 3 June 1986) is a Zambian football midfielder who plays for Zesco United.
