= Yidnekachew Beyene =

Ethiopian professional footballer

Yidnekachew kidane Beyene
Personal information
- Date of birth: 31 October 1989 (age 36)
- Place of birth: Ethiopia
- Position: Goalkeeper

Team information
- Current team: Defence Force SC

International career^{‡}
| Years | Team | Apps | (Gls) |
| 2006– | Ethiopia | 6 | (0) |
- ‡ National team caps and goals as of 21 May 2017

Yidnekachew Kidane is an Ethiopian professional footballer, who plays as a goalkeeper for Defence Force SC.

== International career ==
By June 5, 2011, he was part of Tom sainfets, Ethiopian national team .on this day Ethiopia host super eagles Nigeria for afcon 2012 qualification and match ended 2-2 Yidnekachew was started best 11 for Ethiopia national team .

In January 2014, coach Yohannes Sahle, invited him to be a part of the Ethiopia squad for the 2016 African Nations Championship. The team was eliminated in the group stages after losing to Congo, Libya and Ghana.
