= Abdoul Touré =

Malian footballer

Personal information
- Full name: Abdoul Aziz Touré
- Date of birth: 8 September 1990 (age 36)
- Position: Midfielder

Team information
- Current team: Bakaridjan

Senior career*
Years	Team	Apps	(Gls)
2009–2011	Duguwolofila		
2011–2016?	Real Bamako		
2019–	Bakaridjan		

International career^{‡}
2016	Mali	2	(0)
- * Club domestic league appearances and goals as of 1 August 2020 ‡ National team caps and goals as of 1 August 2020

Abdoul Aziz Touré (born 8 September 1990) is a retired Malian football midfielder who plays for AS Bakaridjan.
