= Stephen Mukatuka =

Zimbabwean footballer (born 1998)

Personal information
- Date of birth: 19 December 1998 (age 27)
- Place of birth: Masvingo, Zimbabwe
- Position: Center-back

Team information
- Current team: Mbabane Swallows

Senior career*
| Years | Team | Apps | (Gls) |
| 2013–2017 | CAPS United | | |
| 2017–2018 | AmaZulu | 2 | (0) |
| 2018 | CAPS United | | |
| 2019– | Mbabane Swallows | | |

International career^{‡}
| 2015– | Zimbabwe | 6 | (0) |
- * Club domestic league appearances and goals as of 20 March 2019 ‡ National team caps and goals as of 20 March 2019

Stephen Mukatuka (born 19 December 1998) is a Zimbabwean footballer who plays as a defender for Mbabane Swallows and the Zimbabwe national football team.

== Career ==
On 31 January 2019, Mukatuka joined Mbabane Swallows in Eswatini.
