= Junior Baometu =

Congolese football defender

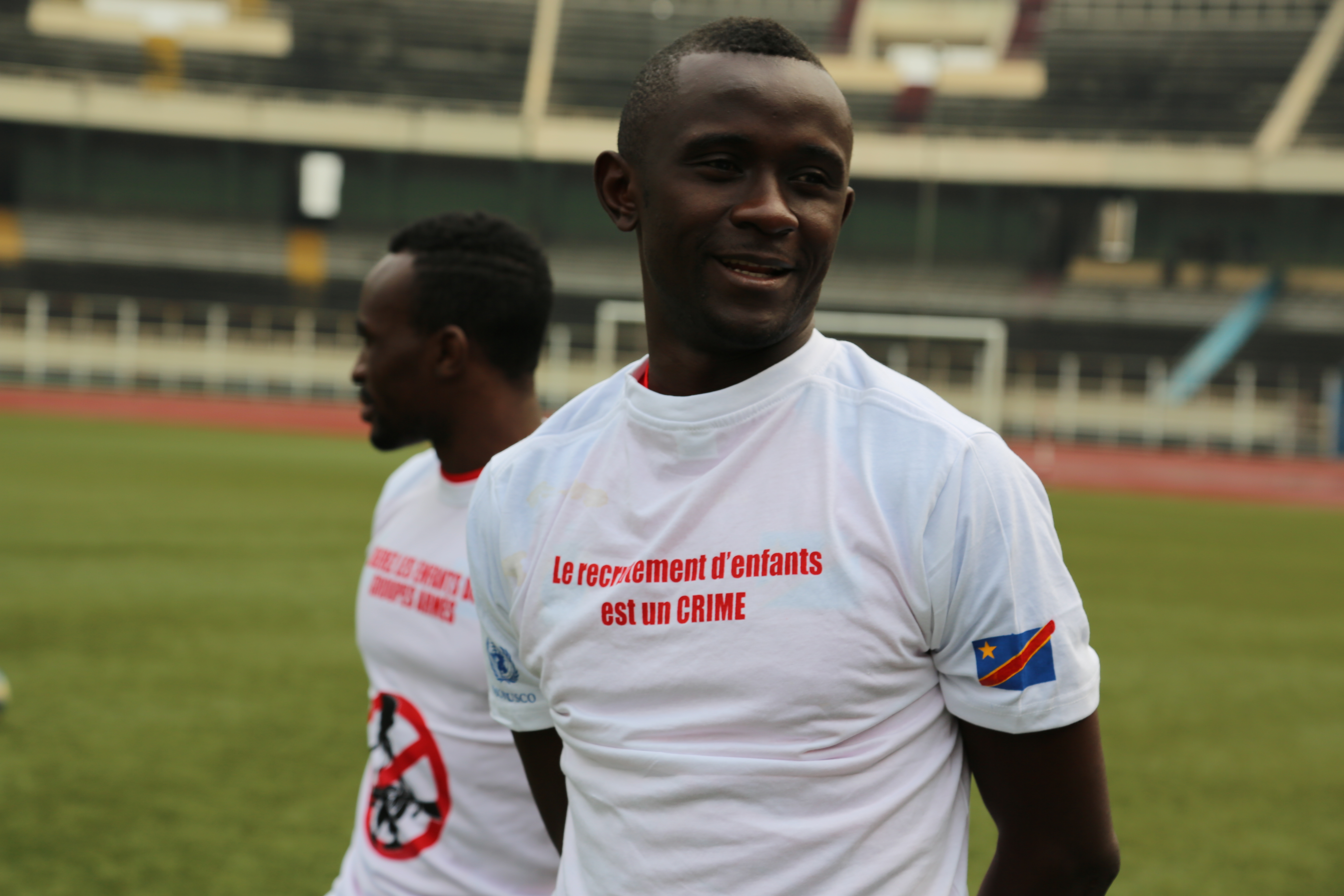

Personal information
- Full name: Junior Baometu Moke
- Date of birth: 9 May 1994 (age 32)
- Place of birth: Kisangani, Zaïre
- Height: 1.82 m (6 ft 0 in)
- Position: Defender

Team information
- Current team: DC Motema Pembe

Senior career*
Years	Team	Apps	(Gls)
–2009	AS Nika		
2009–2012	AS Vita Club		
2013–2016	FC Saint-Éloi Lupopo		
2016–2017	AS Vita Club		
2017–2023	DC Motema Pembe		

International career
2016–2023	DR Congo	9	(0)
- * Club domestic league appearances and goals

Junior Baometu Moke (born 9 May 1994) is a Congolese football defender who plays for DC Motema Pembe.
