= Johannes Ngodzo =

Zimbabwean footballer (born 1980)

Personal information
- Date of birth: 6 November 1980 (age 45)
- Height: 1.78 m (5 ft 10 in)
- Positions: Midfielder; winger

Senior career*
Years	Team	Apps	(Gls)
2000–2012	Highlanders F.C.		
2013–2016	Bantu Rovers F.C.		

International career
2002–2006	Zimbabwe	32	(4)
- * Club domestic league appearances and goals

Johannes Ngodzo (born 6 November 1980) is a retired Zimbabwean football midfielder.
