= Dennis Okot =

Ugandan footballer (born 1990)

Personal information
- Full name: Dennis Okot Oola
- Date of birth: 1 December 1990 (age 35)
- Place of birth: Gulu, Uganda
- Position: Right back

Team information
- Current team: BIDCO Bul

Senior career*
Years	Team	Apps	(Gls)
2014–2015	Victoria University		
2015–2018	Kampala CCA		
2018–2019	Onduparaka		
2019–	BIDCO Bul		

International career^{‡}
2015–	Uganda	12	(0)
- * Club domestic league appearances and goals as of 15:23, 9 March 2018 (UTC) ‡ National team caps and goals as of 15:23, 9 March 2018 (UTC)

Dennis Okot Oola (born 1 December 1990) is an Ugandan international footballer who plays for BIDCO Bul, as a defender.

== Career ==
Born in Gulu, has played club football for Victoria University and Kampala Capital City Authority.

He made his international debut for Uganda in 2015.
