= Elisha Muroiwa =

Zimbabwean footballer (born 1989)

Personal information
- Date of birth: 28 January 1989 (age 37)
- Place of birth: Glen View, Zimbabwe
- Height: 1.75 m (5 ft 9 in)
- Position: Right back

Team information
- Current team: Mufulira Wanderers

Senior career*
Years	Team	Apps	(Gls)
2010	Harare Sporting		
2011–2013	Highfield United		
2014–2017	Dynamos		
2017–2019	Singida United		
2019–	Mufulira Wanderers		

International career^{‡}
2016–	Zimbabwe	11	(1)
- * Club domestic league appearances and goals as of 13:04, 21 January 2017 (UTC) ‡ National team caps and goals as of 13:04, 21 January 2017 (UTC)

Elisha Muroiwa (born 28 January 1989) is a Zimbabwean international footballer who plays for Mufulira Wanderers as a right back.

== Career ==
Muroiwa has played for Harare Sporting, Highfield United and Dynamos.

He made his international debut in 2016, and was named in the squad for the 2017 Africa Cup of Nations.
