= Hardlife Zvirekwi =

Zimbabwean footballer (born 1987)

Personal information
- Full name: Hardlife Daniel Zvirekwi
- Date of birth: 5 May 1987 (age 39)
- Place of birth: Fort Charter, Zimbabwe
- Height: 1.75 m (5 ft 9 in)
- Position: Defender

Team information
- Current team: CAPS United

Senior career*
Years	Team	Apps	(Gls)
2009–2013	Gunners		
2013–	CAPS United		

International career^{‡}
2013–	Zimbabwe	38	(0)
- * Club domestic league appearances and goals as of 29 June 2016 ‡ National team caps and goals as of 29 June 2016

Hardlife Zvirekwi (born 5 May 1987) is a Zimbabwean professional footballer, who plays as a defender for CAPS United and the Zimbabwe national team.

== Career ==
=== Club ===
Zvirekwi started his career with Gunners and he won the Zimbabwe Premier Soccer League title in 2009 as Gunners finished five points clear of Dynamos. He remained a Gunners player for four years in total until he departed in 2013 to join CAPS United. In January 2016, Zvirekwi signed a new three-year deal with CAPS Utd.

=== International ===
Zvirekwi made his international debut for Zimbabwe on 9 June 2013 in a 2–4 defeat versus Egypt in a 2014 FIFA World Cup qualifier. Two more appearances followed for him against Mozambique and South Africa in 2013. In January 2014, coach Ian Gorowa, invited him to be a part of the Zimbabwe squad for the 2014 African Nations Championship. He helped the team to a fourth-place finish after being defeated by Nigeria by a goal to nil.

Six appearances followed at the 2014 African Nations Championship. Zvirekwi had to wait two more years until his next Zimbabwe caps when he was selected for the 2016 African Nations Championship, he played in all three of Zimbabwe's fixtures in the competition.

== Personal life ==
In March 2018, Zvirekwi had his left hand amputated by surgeons following a car crash in Harare.

== Career statistics ==
=== International ===
As of 29 June 2016.

National team	Year	Apps	Goals
Zimbabwe	2013	3	0
Zimbabwe	2014	6	0
Zimbabwe	2015	0	0
Zimbabwe	2016	3	0
Total		12	0

== Honours ==
=== Club ===
Gunners

- Zimbabwe Premier Soccer League (1): 2009

=== Individual ===
CAPS United

- Soccer Star of the Year (1): 2016
