= Orji Kalu =

Nigerian footballer

Orji Kalu Okogbue
Personal information
- Date of birth: 9 February 1992 (age 34)
- Place of birth: Jos, Nigeria
- Height: 1.88 m (6 ft 2 in)
- Position: Centre-back

Team information
- Current team: Mouloudia Oujda

Youth career
- –2009: Heartland FC

Senior career*
Years	Team	Apps	(Gls)
2009–2014	Heartland FC	104	(2)
2014–2017	Enugu Rangers	97	(4)
2017	Tirana	?	(0)
2018	Kano Pillars		
2018–	Mouloudia Oujda	?	(0)

International career
2015–	Nigeria	11	(0)
- * Club domestic league appearances and goals

Orji Kalu Okogbue (born 9 February 1992) is a Nigerian footballer who plays as a centre-back for Mouloudia Oujda in the Moroccan Botola.

== Honours ==
Tirana

- Albanian Supercup: 2017
