= Highlanders F.C. =

Zimbabwean football club

Highlanders FC
- Full name: Highlanders Football Club
- Nicknames: Bosso, Bosso Tshilamoya, Bossolona, Amahlolanyama uMantengwane Ezimnyama ngenkani.
- Founded: 1926; 100 years ago
- Ground: Barbourfields Stadium; Bulawayo, Zimbabwe
- Capacity: 40,000
- Coach: Benjani Mwaruwari
- League: Zimbabwe Premier Soccer League (ZPSL)
- 2025: 11th of 18
- Website: www.highlandersfc.co.zw
Home colours	Away colours

Highlanders Football Club, or more commonly Highlanders F.C., is a Zimbabwean football club based in Bulawayo, Zimbabwe that plays in the Zimbabwe Premier Soccer League. It is also known colloquially as iBosso, Amahlolanyama.

Founded in 1926 as Lions Football Club, composed mainly of boys born in Makokoba (Bulawayo's oldest township) by two of the Ndebele King Lobengula's grandsons, Albert and Rhodes, who were sons of Njube. In 1936, the players changed the name to Matebeleland Highlanders Football Club.

Within Zimbabwe, Highlanders FC are considered deeply tied to the Northern Ndebele people. The team is often a vehicle for expression of Ndebele nationalism in a country where the Ndebele are a minority group.

== History ==
In the 19th century, colonial authorities sought to appease the Ndebele King Lobengula by proposing that his grandsons be sent to study in the Cape Province of South Africa. In 1926, the two brothers returned from South Africa. Albert had completed his studies in agriculture at Tsolo Agricultural School, while Rhodes had studied bookkeeping at Lovedale Institute. Both brothers had taken up football as an extracurricular activity. Rhodes continued his involvement in the sport and went on to form a team called the Lions Football Club, primarily composed of boys born in Makokoba, Bulawayo's oldest township.

In 1936, the players renamed the team to Matebeleland Highlanders Football Club. In 1966, the Rhodesia National Football League (RNFL) invited Highlanders to join the league. They agreed, and they were placed in the 2nd Division two years later. Highlanders finished at the top of the table in their first season and were promoted to Division One.

In 1970, Highlanders entered the Super League. However, after securing only 7 points, the team was relegated to the first division. They returned to the top flight in 1971. In 1972, Tony McIlveen, a player from Northern Ireland who had previously played semi-professionally for Irish League side Crusaders, joined the Highlanders. Though not tall, McIlveen's work rate and dynamism in midfield proved valuable to the team. In 1973, Highlanders won the Chibuku Trophy, defeating the high-profile Mangula side at Rufaro Stadium. In 1976, the club became dissatisfied with the national football administration under John Madzima. As a result, Highlanders withdrew from the RNFL and helped establish the South Zone Soccer League (SZSL). This move led to a split within the club, with some senior members leaving to form a breakaway team called Olympics, which also adopted the Highlanders' black and white strip. Despite this, Highlanders remained intact. By 1979, several Harare-based clubs supported Highlanders’ stance against the national association, citing issues such as unfair gate revenue distribution, flawed financial accounting, and biased treatment of select teams. These efforts culminated in the formation of the National Professional Soccer League (NPSL).

In 1980, the NPSL and RNFL were merged to create the Zimbabwe Football Association (ZIFA). In 1986, several senior Highlanders players left the club following disputes with executives over finances. The club responded by promoting apprentices to the senior team.

Between 1999 and 2002, Highlanders won the Zimbabwe Premier League four times in succession. They were coached by Rahman Gumbo in 1999 and 2000. Gumbo was dismissed after failing to advance in the African Champions League’s group stages. Eddie May took over in 2001 and led the team to back-to-back league titles. In 2006, Highlanders last won the league title under the leadership of former midfielder Methembe Ndlovu. The squad included players such as Vusa Nyoni, Johannes Ngodzo, Honour Gombami, Ralph “Banolila” Matema, and Obadiah Tarumbwa.

In Zimbabwe, players from Highlanders who have played at the highest level of professional football in the world include Benjamin Nkonjera.

Highlanders is the second-most supported club in Zimbabwe with over 5 million supporters, after Dynamos who have over 7 million supporters. The support for these two clubs has tribal origins, as Highlanders are supported by both Ndebele-speaking people and those residing in the Matebeleland region.

Prior to the start of the 2026 Zimbabwe Premier Soccer League, Highlanders received a cash injection of US$585,000 (R10.4 million) from Wicknell Chivayo, and brought in former international and Manchester City star Benjani Mwaruwari as coach, weeks after appointing Thabo Senong to the position.

However, the sponsorship payment system, which involves numerous middlemen, broke down, leading to Chivayo only receiving one month's salary by April 2026, with numerous other obligations unpaid.

== Club identity and culture ==
Highlanders FC and its supporter base is deeply interwoven with the (Northern) Ndebele ethnic group of Zimbabwe. The club’s founding in 1926 by the sons of King Lobengula (the last monarch of the Ndebele state) established it from the outset as an institution tied to Ndebele royal lineage, identity, and pride. Based in Bulawayo, the capital of Matabeleland, Highlanders FC quickly became a cultural emblem of the region’s Ndebele-speaking communities. Thus, supporting Highlanders became tied to the expression of belonging to a historically marginalised ethnic group within the Zimbabwean nation-state.

Support for the club often involves more than following football. Among its supporters, attending a match at Barbourfields Stadium (commonly known as Emagumeni) is sometimes described as a cultural act. Many fans use this space to express grievances, cultural pride, and political frustration through songs, chants, and banners. The language of support is typically in isiNdebele, and matchday rituals sometimes include references to Ndebele history and identity. While Highlanders is not officially aligned with any political party, it is widely understood to be a site where political sentiment can be expressed indirectly. The club has resisted efforts by both ruling and opposition parties in Zimbabwe to co-opt its influence. The club remains community-owned, with a strong grassroots character. The club is viewed by many fans as the last enduring "parliament" of the Ndebele people, particularly given the decline of explicitly Ndebele political parties such as the Zimbabwe African People's Union and the marginalisation of Ndebele voices in mainstream Zimbabwean politics.

The rivalry with Dynamos F.C., Zimbabwe’s most prominent club associated with the Shona-speaking majority, carries an added layer of meaning. Matches between the two are seen by some as symbolic confrontations, reflecting broader national tensions between regions and ethnic groups. While not all supporters view the fixture in this way, for many Highlanders fans, a win over Dynamos can resonate as more than just a sporting victory. At the same time, this strong ethnic association has also led to criticism. Some observers note that Highlanders' supporter culture occasionally slips into tribal chauvinism or particularism, with rhetoric that emphasises ethnic separation rather than national unity. There have also been incidents of violence linked to the fanbase, which critics argue undermines the legitimacy of their broader concerns.

=== Rivalries ===
Highlanders' most bitter rival is Dynamos from Harare, and the matches between these two giants have been dubbed "Battle of Zimbabwe". The battles between Bosso and Dembare are similar to those between the two Soweto Giants Orlando Pirates and Kaizer Chiefs in South Africa in the Soweto derby. CAPS United is also another Bosso's rival, and the matches pitting these two teams have been dubbed "Battle of the Cities". These matches were in the past associated with a lot of violent clashes amongst the fans.

=== Nicknames ===
Highlanders are known by their nicknames, Bosso, Tshilamoya, Amahlolanyama, Ezikamagebhula, High High, and Mantengwane, among many others. Bosso is derived from Setswana slang and means "The Boss". "Tshilamoya" is IsiNdebele and, loosely interpreted, could mean "big-upsetters" or "demoralisers", a term coined in apparent reference to the Team's nemesis. "Amahlolanyama" is Ndebele for the Grey-Crested Helmet-shrike, a bird found mostly in Southern parts of Zimbabwe whose black and white colours resemble those of the team. EzikaMagebhula, a nickname for Orlando Pirates, can also be used in reference to Highlanders FC, possibly because of the similarity of both clubs' colours. Ezimnyama ngenkani means the blacks by force.

=== Club motto ===
"Siyinqaba!" – "We are a Fortress!"

== Honours ==
Highlanders FC Honours
Honour	No.	Years
Zimbabwe Premier Soccer League	7	1990, 1993, 1999, 2000, 2001, 2002, 2006
Cup of Zimbabwe / Chibuku Cup	8	1973, 1980, 1984, 1986, 1990, 2001, 2013, 2019
Zimbabwean Independence Trophy	10	1986, 1988, 1991, 1998, 2001, 2002, 2011, 2019, 2022, 2023
Zimbabwean Charity Shield	5	1986, 2001, 2005, 2015, 2016
Natbrew Cup	1	1986
Heroes Cup	1	1986
Cosmos Challenge Cup	2	1998, 1999
BP Cup	1	1994
Livingstone Memorial Cup	2	1953, 1955

== Performance in CAF competitions ==
- CAF Champions League: 5 appearances

2000 – Second Round
2001 – First Round
2002 – First Round
2003 – Second Round
2007 – First Round

- African Cup of Champions Clubs: 2 appearances

1991 – Second Round
1994 – disqualified in First Round

- CAF Confederation Cup: 2 appearances

2008 – Round of 16
2011 – withdrew in preliminary round

- CAF Cup Winners' Cup: 3 appearances

1986 – First Round
1987 – First Round
1992 – First Round

== Notable former coaches ==
- (Zimbabwe) Rahman Gumbo
- (Zimbabwe) Barry Daka
- (Zimbabwe) Cosmas Zulu
- (England) Eddie May (2001–03)
- (Zimbabwe) Methembe Ndlovu (2006–07)
- (Zimbabwe) Madinda Ndlovu (2009)
- (Zambia) Dick Chama
- (Zambia) Kelvin Kaindu (2011–2014)
- (Zimbabwe) Bongani Mafu (2015–2016)
- (Netherlands) Erol Akbay (2016-2017)
- (Zimbabwe) Mandla Mpofu (2019)
- (Netherlands) Pieter de Jongh (2019)
- (England) Mark Harrison (2020–2021)
- (Zimbabwe) Mandla Mpofu (2021–2022)
- (Brazil) Baltemar Brito (2022–2023)
- (Zambia) Kelvin Kaindu (2023–2025)
- (Netherlands) Pieter de Jongh (2025)
- (South Africa) Thabo Senong (2026–2026)
- (Zimbabwe) Benjani Mwaruwari (2026–)

== Notable former players ==
- (Zimbabwe) Tymon Mabaleka
- (Zimbabwe) Peter Ndlovu
- (Zimbabwe) Adam Ndlovu
- (Zimbabwe) Bruce Grobbelaar
- (United States) Andrew Shue
- (United States) Ethan Zohn
- (Zimbabwe) Johannes Ngodzo
