= Arcadia United =

Association football club in Zimbabwe

Arcadia United Football Club is an association football club based in Harare, Zimbabwe.

== History ==
Arcadia United competed in the Zimbabwean top flight.
