= 2020 Botswana FA Cup =

Football tournament season in Botswana

2020 FA Challenge Cup (Botswana)
Tournament details
- Country: Botswana
- Dates: 14 December 2019 – 11 December 2021

Final positions
- Champions: Gaborone United (7th title)
- Runners-up: Masitaoka

Tournament statistics
- Matches played: 47
- Goals scored: 102 (2.17 per match)
- Top goal scorer: Kekaetswe Moloi (3 goals)

Awards
- Best player: Thatayaone Kgamanyane

The 2020 FA Challenge Cup was the 47th edition of the FA Challenge Cup, Botswana's premier football knockout tournament. It was sponsored by Orange and was known as the Orange FA Cup or Orange FA Cup Season 2 for sponsorship reasons. It started with the preliminary round on the weekend of 14 December 2019 and concluded with the final on 11 December 2021.

Orapa United were the defending champions but were eliminated by Gaborone United in the round of 16.

== Qualifying rounds ==
All 16 Premier League teams automatically qualified to the round of 32. The top 8 teams from First Division South and top 8 from First Division North had to go through the preliminary round and were joined by the 16 regional champions. Winners of this round qualified for the round of 32.

== Preliminary round ==
The preliminary round draw took place on 23 January 2019. The draw was seeded into two, namely the northern and southern blocks. Southern block games were played on 16 and 17 February while northern block games were played on 23 and 24 February.

Southern block

Date	Home	Score	Away	Ground
16 February	Jwaneng Fighters	0-0 (3-1 pen.)	Digodi	Mankgodi Show Grounds
16 February	Holy Ghost	0-1	Tlokweng Red Sparks	Tlokweng VDC Grounds
16 February	Blue Stars	1-5	Notwane	Tshane Prisons Grounds
16 February	Black Peril	5-1	Mogoditshane Fighters	Tlokweng VDC Grounds
16 February	Sand Diamonds	0-0 (4-3 pen.)	Motaung Young Fighters	Tshane Prisons Grounds
17 February	Broadhurst United	0-1	Atlanta Chiefs	Mochudi Rovers Grounds
17 February	Mochudi Rovers	0-0 (10-11 pen.)	Prisons XI	Mochudi Rovers Grounds
17 February	Black Rangers	3-1	King Rodgers	Tsabong VDC Grounds

Northern block

Date	Home	Score	Away	Ground
23 February	Great North Tigers	4-3	Eleven Angels	Francistown City Council Stadium
23 February	Motlakase Power Dynamos	1-1 (7-8)	Peacemakers	Bobonong Show Grounds
23 February	Calendar Stars	1-1 (4-3)	Maun Terrors	Francistown City Council Stadium
23 February	Kazungula Young Fighters	0-0 (7-6)	White Diamonds	Kasane Prisons Grounds
23 February	Palapye All Stars	2-2 (1-3)	Sua Flamingos	Phikwe United Grounds
23 February	Santa Green	3-2	Morupule Wanderers	Phikwe United Grounds
24 February	BR Highlanders	4-0	Green Lovers	Serowe Sports Council Stadium
24 February	Nico United	3-1	Tsabotlhe	Serowe Sports Council Stadium

== Round of 32 ==
The round of 32 draw was conducted on 18 January 2020. It was not seeded. King Rodgers, Tsabotlhe, and Tonota from Division One were the lowest ranked teams still in the competition.

Date	Home	Score	Away	Ground
22 February	King Rodgers	0-2	Jwaneng Fighters	
22 February	Mogoditshane Fighters	1-5	Orapa United	
22 February	Masitaoka	2-1	Sankoyo Bush Bucks	
22 February	Uniao Flamengo Santos	0-1	Mochudi Rovers	
22 February	Mochudi Centre Chiefs	3-4	MR Highlanders	
22 February	Prisons XI Gaborone	1-1 (6-5)	Tsabotlhe	
22 February	Miscellaneous	0-2	Jwaneng Galaxy	
22 February	Tonota FC	0-6	Township Rollers	
22 February	Diamond Chiefs	0-0 (5-4)	Extension Gunners	
22 February	Motlakase Power Dynamos	0-0 (4-5)	Broadhurst United	
22 February	Morupule Wanderers	1-1 (4-5)	Notwane	
22 February	Security Systems	0-0 (5-6)	BDF XI	
22 February	Gaborone United	2-0	Black Forest	
22 February	Matebejana	0-2	Calendar Stars	
22 February	Sua Flamingos	1-0	Molepolole City Stars	
22 February	Police XI	2-1	Eleven Angels	

== Round of 16 ==
The round of 16 draw was conducted on 4 April 2019. It was not seeded. Jwaneng Fighters, Sand Diamonds and Kazungula Young Fighters from Division One are the lowest ranked teams still in the competition.

Date	Home	Score	Away	Ground
13 March	Notwane	2-0	BDF XI	
13 March	Orapa United	3-4	Gaborone United	Itekeng Stadium
13 March	Mochudi Rovers	0-2	Jwaneng Galaxy	
14 March	Sua Flamingos	0-1	Township Rollers	
14 March	Police XI	1-3	Prisons XI	
14 March	Diamond Chiefs	0-1	Masitaoka	
15 March	Broadhurst United	0-0 (2-3)	MR Highlanders	
15 March	Calendar Stars	2-1	Jwaneng Fighters	
