= 2014–15 Botswana Premier League =

Botswana Premier League
- Season: 2014–15
- Champions: Mochudi Centre Chiefs
- Relegated: Notwane; Letlapeng; ECCO City Greens
- Champions League: Mochudi Centre Chiefs
- Confederation Cup: Gaborone United
- Matches: 240
- Goals: 602 (2.51 per match)
- Top goalscorer: Lemponye Tshireletso (15 goals)
- Biggest home win: Township Rollers 6-1 Orapa United (29 Nov 2014); Orapa United 6-1 Motlakase Power Dynamos (27 Feb 2015); Nico United 5-0 Letlapeng (2 May 2015)
- Biggest away win: BR Highlanders 0-7 Township Rollers (30 Aug 2014)
- Highest scoring: Sankoyo Bush Bucks 6-2 Letlapeng (22 Nov 2014)
- Longest winning run: Township Rollers (7)
- Longest unbeaten run: Mochudi Centre Chiefs (19)
- Longest winless run: ECCO City Greens (13)
- Longest losing run: Letlapeng (8)

The 2014–15 Botswana Premier League was the 38th season of the Botswana Premier League since its establishment in 1978. A total of 16 teams contested the league, with Township Rollers as the defending champions.

== Team summaries ==
Locations of teams in the 2014–15 Botswana Premier League

=== Promotion and relegation ===
Teams promoted from Botswana First Division North and South

- BR Highlanders
- Letlapeng FC
- Police XI
- Sankoyo Bush Bucks

Teams relegated to Botswana First Division North and South

- Miscellaneous
- TAFIC F.C.
- UF Santos
- Wonder Sporting

=== Stadiums and locations ===
Team	Location	Stadium	Stadium capacity
Botswana Defence Force XI FC	Gaborone	SSKB Stadium	5,000
Botswana Meat Commission F.C.	Lobatse	Lobatse Stadium	22,000
Botswana Railways Highlanders	Molepolole	Molepolole Stadium	6,600
ECCO City Green	Francistown	Francistown Stadium	26,000
Extension Gunners	Lobatse	Lobatse Stadium	22,000
F.C. Satmos	Selebi-Phikwe	Selebi-Phikwe Stadium	9,000
Gaborone United S.C.	Gaborone	Botswana National Stadium	22,500
Letlapeng FC			
Mochudi Centre Chiefs SC	Gaborone	Botswana National Stadium	22,500
Motlakase Power Dynamos	Palapye	Palapye Stadium	1,000
Nico United	Selebi-Phikwe	Selebi-Phikwe Stadium	9,000
Notwane F.C.	Molepolole	Molepolole Stadium	6,600
Orapa United FC	Orapa	Itekeng Stadium	5,000
Police XI	Otse	Otse Stadium	2,000
Sankoyo Bush Bucks FC	Maun	Maun Stadium	
Township Rollers F.C.	Gaborone	Botswana National Stadium	22,500

== League table ==
Pos	Team	Pld	W	D	L	GF	GA	GD	Pts	Qualification or relegation
1	Centre Chiefs (C, Q)	30	20	8	2	62	27	+35	68	Qualification for 2016 CAF Champions League
2	Orapa United	30	18	7	5	43	24	+19	61	
3	Township Rollers	30	18	5	7	61	29	+32	59	
4	Gaborone United	30	14	8	8	40	29	+11	50	
5	BDF XI	30	14	7	9	38	28	+10	49	
6	Extension Gunners	30	13	7	10	27	25	+2	46	
7	Police XI	30	11	10	9	31	30	+1	43	
8	BMC	30	10	10	10	42	36	+6	40	
9	Nico United	30	10	9	11	41	31	+10	39	
10	Motlakase Power Dynamos	30	10	7	13	35	46	−11	37	
11	BR Highlanders	30	10	6	14	30	47	−17	36	
12	Sankoyo Bush Bucks	30	10	5	15	37	40	−3	35	
13	Satmos	30	9	5	16	34	47	−13	32	
14	Notwane (R)	30	8	7	15	37	51	−14	31	Relegation to Botswana First Division North and South
15	Letlapeng (R)	30	5	5	20	21	56	−35	20	Relegation to Botswana First Division North and South
16	ECCO City Greens (R)	30	4	6	20	23	56	−33	18	Relegation to Botswana First Division North and South

Updated to match(es) played on 17 May 2015. Source: soccerway.com
Rules for classification: 1) points; 2) goal difference; 3) number of goals scored.
(C) Champions; (Q) Qualified for the phase indicated; (R) Relegated

== Positions by round ==
Team ╲ Round	1	2	3	4	5	6	7	8	9	10	11	12	13	14	15	16	17	18	19	20	21	22	23	24	25	26	27	28	29	30
Centre Chiefs	3	1	1	1	1	1	1	2	3	3	3	3	2	2	2	2	2	2	1	1	1	1	1	1	1	1	1	1	1	1
Orapa United	16	14	15	11	7	6	9	8	8	8	8	8	8	8	7	6	6	4	4	3	2	2	2	2	2	3	2	2	2	2
Township Rollers	7	11	7	2	4	4	4	3	1	1	1	1	1	1	1	1	1	1	2	2	3	3	3	3	3	2	3	3	3	3
Gaborone United	11	5	4	5	6	5	5	7	7	7	7	6	4	6	5	5	4	6	5	5	4	4	5	5	4	4	4	4	4	4
BDF XI	1	7	9	6	5	8	7	6	4	4	5	7	7	5	4	4	5	3	3	4	5	5	4	4	5	5	5	5	5	5
Extension Gunners	14	13	14	12	9	7	6	5	6	6	6	4	5	4	6	8	8	9	8	9	9	8	7	7	7	7	6	6	7	6
Police XI	7	4	3	3	2	3	3	4	5	5	4	5	6	7	8	7	7	7	6	6	6	6	6	6	6	6	7	7	6	7
BMC	9	3	2	3	3	2	2	1	2	2	2	2	3	3	3	3	3	5	7	7	7	7	8	8	8	8	8	9	8	8
Nico United	9	12	8	8	10	12	12	12	13	13	13	11	11	11	13	14	15	15	14	14	14	14	14	14	13	13	13	11	9	9
Motlakase Power Dynamos	12	6	4	7	12	9	10	10	11	12	12	13	13	13	15	12	10	11	10	10	10	11	11	10	10	10	11	12	10	10
BR Highlanders	12	16	13	15	15	15	15	15	15	15	14	14	14	14	12	10	11	10	11	13	12	12	13	12	11	11	10	10	12	11
Sankoyo Bush Bucks	5	2	6	9	7	11	11	11	10	10	9	9	9	9	9	9	9	8	9	8	8	9	9	9	9	9	9	8	11	12
Satmos	5	8	11	10	13	10	8	9	9	11	10	10	10	10	11	13	14	13	13	12	13	13	12	13	14	14	14	14	14	13
Notwane	4	8	12	14	11	13	13	13	12	9	11	12	12	12	10	11	12	12	12	11	11	10	10	11	12	12	12	13	13	14
Letlapeng	2	8	10	13	14	14	14	14	14	14	16	15	15	16	16	16	16	16	16	16	16	16	16	16	16	16	16	16	15	15
ECCO City Greens	15	15	16	16	16	16	16	16	16	16	15	16	16	15	14	15	13	14	15	15	15	15	15	15	15	15	15	15	16	16

Leader
Relegation to Zimbabwe Division 1

Updated to match(es) played on 17 May 2015. Source: Soccerway (in French)
