= 2019–20 Botswana Premier League =

Botswana Premier League
- Season: 2019–20
- Champions: Jwaneng Galaxy (1st title)
- Promoted: Sua Flamingoes; Masitaoka; Mogoditshane Fighters
- Relegated: TAFIC; Molepolole City Stars; Miscellaneous
- Champions League: Jwaneng Galaxy
- Confederation Cup: Orapa United
- Matches played: 160
- Goals scored: 403 (2.52 per match)
- Biggest home win: Township Rollers 7-0 Police XI (19 January 2020)
- Biggest away win: Miscellaneous 0-6 Orapa United (2 November 2019)
- Highest scoring: BR Highlanders 2-6 Gaborone United (3 December 2019); Miscellaneous 3-5 BR Highlanders (15 December 2019)
- Longest winning run: Security Systems (6)
- Longest unbeaten run: Jwaneng Galaxy (11)
- Longest winless run: TAFIC; Miscellaneous (11)
- Longest losing run: Miscellaneous (7)

The 2019–20 Botswana Premier League was the 43rd season of the Botswana Premier League, the top-tier football league in Botswana, since its establishment in 1978. The season started on 31 August 2019.

It was abandoned by the Botswana Football Association due to the COVID-19 pandemic in Botswana. The table at the time was considered final) and Jwaneng Galaxy declared champions

== Teams ==
=== Team changes ===
Promoted from the 2018-19 Botswana First Division North

•TAFIC

•Morupule Wanderers

Promoted from the 2018-19 Botswana First Division South

•Gilport Lions

Relegated from the 2018-19 Botswana Premier League

•Sankoyo Bush Bucks

•Mochudi Centre Chiefs

•Black Forest

Name changes

•Sharps Shooting Stars were renamed Molepolole City Stars

•Botswana Railways Highlanders were renamed Mahalapye Railways Highlanders

=== Stadiums and locations ===
Locations of teams in the 2019–20 Botswana Premier League

=== Number of teams by district ===
Position	District	Number	Teams
1	South-East	8	Extension Gunners, Gaborone United, Gilport Lions, Notwane, Police XI, Prisons XI, Security Systems, Township Rollers
2	Central	4	BR Highlanders, Miscellaneous, Morupule Wanderers, Orapa United
3	Kweneng	2	BDF XI, Molepolole City Stars
4	North-East	1	TAFIC
4	South	1	Jwaneng Galaxy

== League table ==
Pos	Team	Pld	W	D	L	GF	GA	GD	Pts	Qualification or relegation
1	Jwaneng Galaxy (C)	20	12	5	3	37	15	+22	41	Qualification for Champions League
2	Township Rollers (Q)	20	12	4	4	45	20	+25	40	Qualification for Confederation Cup
3	Orapa United	20	12	4	4	33	13	+20	40	
4	Security Systems	20	11	6	3	29	17	+12	39	
5	Gaborone United	20	10	6	4	31	17	+14	36	
6	Prisons XI	20	9	5	6	21	27	−6	32	
7	MR Highlanders	20	9	4	7	28	27	+1	31	
8	BDF XI	20	7	7	6	27	22	+5	28	
9	Police XI	20	6	7	7	20	23	−3	25	
10	Gilport Lions	20	6	3	11	19	30	−11	21	
11	Notwane	20	7	4	9	22	26	−4	19	
12	Extension Gunners	20	7	3	10	30	36	−6	18	
13	Morupule Wanderers	20	4	6	10	17	27	−10	18	
14	TAFIC (R)	20	4	6	10	21	36	−15	18	Relegation
15	Molepolole City Stars (R)	20	3	5	12	13	30	−17	11	Relegation
16	Miscellaneous (R)	20	2	3	15	16	43	−27	9	Relegation

Source: RSSF
Rules for classification: 1) points; 2) goal difference; 3) number of goals scored.
(C) Champions; (Q) Qualified for the phase indicated; (R) Relegated

== Stadiums ==
Team	Location	Stadium	Capacity
Jwaneng Galaxy F.C.	Jwaneng	Galaxy Stadium	2,000
Township Rollers F.C.	Gaborone	Botswana National Stadium	25,000
Orapa United F.C.	Orapa	Itekeng Stadium	5,000
Security Systems F.C.	Molepolole	Serowe Sports Complex	6,600
Gaborone United S.C.	Gaborone	Botswana National Stadium	25,000
Prisons XI Gaborone	Otse	Botswana Police College Stadium	1,500
Mahalapye Railway Highlanders	Molepolole	Serowe Sports Complex	6,600
Botswana Defence Force XI F.C.	Mogoditshane	SSKB Stadium	5,000
Botswana Police XI SC	Gaborone	Botswana National Stadium	25,000
Gilport Lions F.C.	Lobatse	Lobatse Stadium	20,000
Notwane F.C.	Gaborone	Botswana National Stadium	25,000
Extension Gunners FC	Lobatse	Lobatse Stadium	20,000
Morupule Wanderers FC	Molepolole	Serowe Sports Complex	6,600
TAFIC F.C.	Francistown	Obed Itani Chilume Stadium	26,000
Molepolole City Stars FC	Molepolole	Serowe Sports Complex	6,600
Miscellaneous SC Serowe	Molepolole	Serowe Sports Complex	6,600
