= List of football clubs in Botswana =

This is a list of football teams in Botswana. For a complete list see Category:Football clubs in Botswana

== B ==
- Black Forest FC
- Botswana Defence Force XI FC
- Botswana Railways Highlanders

== E ==
- ECCO City Green
- Extension Gunners
- Eleven angels

== G ==
- Great North Tigers F.C.
- Gaborone United

== M ==
- Miscellaneous F.C.
- Mochudi Centre Chiefs SC
- Motlakase Power Dynamos

mosetse football club

== N ==
- Nico United
- Notwane

== O ==
- Orapa United FC

== P ==
- Pajomo FC
- Palapye All Stars FC
- Palapye United
- Pilikwe United
- Police XI
- Prisons XI

== S ==
- Satmos
- Sankoyo Bush Bucks
- Security Systems F.C.
- Shooting Stars
- Sua Flamingoes

== T ==
- TAFIC
- TASC FC
- Township Rollers

== U ==
- Uniao Flamengo Santos F.C.

== W ==
- Wonder Sporting Club
