= 2019 Botswana FA Cup =

2019 FA Challenge Cup (Botswana)
Tournament details
- Country: Botswana
- Dates: 16 February – 15 June 2019

Final positions
- Champions: Orapa United (1st title)
- Runners-up: Township Rollers

Tournament statistics
- Matches played: 47
- Goals scored: 126 (2.68 per match)
- Top goal scorer: Omaatla Kebatho (7 goals)

Awards
- Best player: Mothusi Johnson

The 2019 FA Challenge Cup was the 46th edition of the FA Challenge Cup, Botswana's premier football knockout tournament. It was sponsored by Orange and was known as the Orange FA Cup or Orange FA Cup Season 1 for sponsorship reasons. It started with the preliminary round on the weekend of 16 February and concluded with the final on 15 June 2019.

Botswana Premier League side Gaborone United were the defending champions but were eliminated by Extension Gunners on penalties in the round of 32. Orapa United went on to win the title for the first time in history, making them the first Orapa side to do so.

== Qualifying rounds ==
All 16 Premier League teams automatically qualified to the round of 32. The top 8 teams from First Division South and top 8 from First Division North had to go through the preliminary round and were joined by the 16 regional champions. Winners of this round qualified for the round of 32.

== Preliminary round ==
The preliminary round draw took place on 23 January 2019. The draw was seeded into two, namely the northern and southern blocks. Southern block games were played on 16 and 17 February while northern block games were played on 23 and 24 February.

Southern block

Date	Home	Score	Away	Ground
16 February	Jwaneng Fighters	0-0 (3-1 pen.)	Digodi	Mankgodi Show Grounds
16 February	Holy Ghost	0-1	Tlokweng Red Sparks	Tlokweng VDC Grounds
16 February	Blue Stars	1-5	Notwane	Tshane Prisons Grounds
16 February	Black Peril	5-1	Mogoditshane Fighters	Tlokweng VDC Grounds
16 February	Sand Diamonds	0-0 (4-3 pen.)	Motaung Young Fighters	Tshane Prisons Grounds
17 February	Broadhurst United	0-1	Atlanta Chiefs	Mochudi Rovers Grounds
17 February	Mochudi Rovers	0-0 (10-11 pen.)	Prisons XI	Mochudi Rovers Grounds
17 February	Black Rangers	3-1	King Rodgers	Tsabong VDC Grounds

Northern block

Date	Home	Score	Away	Ground
23 February	Great North Tigers	4-3	Eleven Angels	Francistown City Council Stadium
23 February	Motlakase Power Dynamos	1-1 (7-8)	Peacemakers	Bobonong Show Grounds
23 February	Calendar Stars	1-1 (4-3)	Maun Terrors	Francistown City Council Stadium
23 February	Kazungula Young Fighters	0-0 (7-6)	White Diamonds	Kasane Prisons Grounds
23 February	Palapye All Stars	2-2 (1-3)	Sua Flamingos	Phikwe United Grounds
23 February	Santa Green	3-2	Morupule Wanderers	Phikwe United Grounds
24 February	BR Highlanders	4-0	Green Lovers	Serowe Sports Council Stadium
24 February	Nico United	3-1	Tsabotlhe	Serowe Sports Council Stadium

== Round of 32 ==
The round of 32 draw was conducted on 24 February 2019 after the conclusion of the preliminary round. It was not seeded. Jwaneng Fighters, Atlanta Chiefs, Black Rangers, Black Peril, Sand Diamonds, Peacemakers, Kazungula Young Fighters and Santa Green from Division One are the lowest ranked teams still in the competition.

Date	Home	Score	Away	Ground
29 March	Gaborone United	2-2 (7-8)	Extension Gunners	
29 March	Santa Green	0-3	Township Rollers	Serowe Sports Complex
30 March	Notwane	2-1	Tlokweng Red Sparks	
30 March	Great North Tigers	0-1	Miscellaneous	
30 March	Sand Diamonds	0-0 (4-2)	Black Peril	
30 March	Nico United	1-2	BDF XI	
30 March	BR Highlanders	0-0 (10-9)	Uniao Flamengo Santos	
30 March	Police XI	1-0	Sharps Shooting Stars	
30 March	Calendar Stars	1-2	Kazungula Young Fighters	
30 March	Black Forest	0-0 (9-10)	Security Systems	
30 March	Sua Flamingos	1-2	Sankoyo Bush Bucks	
30 March	Peacemakers	0-10	Orapa United	
31 March	Atlanta Chiefs	2-4	Jwaneng Fighters	
31 March	Prisons XI	1-2	TAFIC	
31 March	Mochudi Centre Chiefs	2-1	Gilport Lions	
31 March	Jwaneng Galaxy	1-1 (5-4)	Black Rangers	

== Round of 16 ==
The round of 16 draw was conducted on 4 April 2019. It was not seeded. Jwaneng Fighters, Sand Diamonds and Kazungula Young Fighters from Division One are the lowest ranked teams still in the competition.

Date	Home	Score	Away	Ground
13 April	Extension Gunners	0-1	Township Rollers	Lobatse Sports Complex
13 April	Sankoyo Bush Bucks	0-1	Jwaneng Galaxy	
13 April	Notwane	1-3	BDF XI	
13 April	BR Highlanders	1-2	Security Systems	
13 April	Kazungula Young Fighters	2-1	TAFIC	
13 April	Sand Diamonds	0-4	Orapa United	
14 April	Jwaneng Fighters	1-1 (3-1)	Mochudi Centre Chiefs	
14 April	Police XI	4-2	Miscellaneous	

== Quarterfinals ==
The quarterfinal draw was conducted on 14 April after the conclusion of the round of 16. It was not seeded. Jwaneng Fighters and Kazungula Young Fighters from Division One are the lowest ranked teams still in the competition.

Date	Home	Score	Away	Ground
27 April	Kazungula Young Fighters	0-1	Township Rollers	Chobe JSS Ground
27 April	Orapa United	2-1	Security Systems	
28 April	Jwaneng Fighters	0-0 (4-5)	Police XI	
28 April	BDF XI	0-0 (5-4)	Jwaneng Galaxy	

== Semifinals ==
The semifinal draw was conducted on 28 April after the Jwaneng Fighters and Police XI game.

Date	Home	Score	Away	Ground
18 May 2019	Police XI	1-4	Orapa United	Botswana National Stadium
18 May 2019	BDF XI	0-2	Township Rollers	Botswana National Stadium

== Final ==
Date	Winners	Score	Runners-up	Ground
15 June 2019	Orapa United	3-0	Township Rollers	Francistown Stadium

== Awards ==
- Top goalscorer | (Botswana) Omaatla Kebatho (7 goals) | Orapa United
- Player of the tournament | (Botswana) Mothusi Johnson | Orapa United
- Goalkeeper of the tournament | (Botswana) Lesenya Malapela | Orapa United
- Coach of the tournament | (Botswana) Mogomotsi Mpote | Orapa United
- Referee of the tournament | (Botswana) Joshua Bondo
- Assistant referee of the tournament | (Botswana) Mogomotsi Morakile
- Fan of the tournament | (Botswana) Luka Daniel | Township Rollers
