= 2012 Botswana FA Cup =

2012 Botswana Football Association Challenge Cup
Tournament details
- Country: Botswana
- Dates: 24 March – 5 August 2012

Final positions
- Champions: Gaborone United (6th title)
- Runners-up: Mochudi Centre Chiefs

Tournament statistics
- Matches played: 64

The 2012 FA Challenge Cup was the 45th edition of the FA Challenge Cup, Botswana's premier football knockout tournament. It was sponsored by Coca-Cola and was known as the Coca-Cola Cup for sponsorship reasons. It started with the extra preliminary round on 24 March 2012 and concluded with the final on 5 August 2012. The winner qualified for the 2013 CAF Confederation Cup.

Botswana Premier League side Extension Gunners were the defending champions but were eliminated by BDF XI in the round of 16. Gaborone United went on to win the title for a sixth time, matching Township Rollers's record for most FA Cup wins.

== Extra preliminary round ==
Date	Home	Score	Away	Ground
24 March 2012	Selibe Phikwe Pirates	2-2 (7-6 pen.)	Pandamatenga	Sam Sono Integrated Stadium
24 March 2012	Lobatse Stars	6-0	Kumakwane Happy Boys	Lobatse Stadium
24 March 2012	Desert Nxau	3-3 (3-4 pen.)	XI Men	Tsabong Stadium
24 March 2012	Black Forest	1-1 (4-5 pen.)	Tlokweng United	Mmankgodi Grounds
24 March 2012	Mosojane	0-0 (4-3 pen.)	Lehututu Golden Arrows	Lekhubu Grounds
24 March 2012	Molapo Green Birds	3-0	Mochudi United	Molapo Green Birds Grounds
24 March 2012	Sankoyo Bush Bucks	5-1	Ghanzi Terrors	Maun Stadium
24 March 2012	Security Systems	4-0	Gamaila Warriors	Mogoditshane Fighters Grounds
24 March 2012	Modipane United	4-1	Motaung Young Fighters	Modipane Grounds
24 March 2012	Kgabosetso Southern Pirates	0-0 (5-4 pen.)	Lesirane City	Manaana Grounds
24 March 2012	Wonder Sporting	2-1	Amagents	SSG Grounds
25 March 2012	Tiptoe Boys	2-3	Tshikinyega Tigers	Palapye Swallows Grounds
25 March 2012	Real Movers	2-0	Sladden Eagles	Sam Sono Integrated Stadium
25 March 2012	Amakhosi	0-2	Field Masters	Francistown Stadium
25 March 2012	Mochudi Real Masters	2-0	Lucky Brothers FC	Mochudi Buffaloes Grounds
25 March 2012	Two Two Five	-	Peacemakers	Francistown Stadium

== Preliminary round ==
Date	Home	Score	Away	Ground
13 April 2012	Security Systems		Sua Flamingos	
13 April 2012	Sankoyo Bush Bucks		Satmos	
13 April 2012	Selibe Phikwe Pirates		BR Highlanders	
13 April 2012	Tshikinyega Tigers		Great North Tigers	
13 April 2012	Real Movers		Orapa Wanderers	
13 April 2012	Peacemakers		Mahalapye United Hotspurs	
13 April 2012	Modipane United		No Mathata	
13 April 2012	Wonder Sporting		Mathaithai	
13 April 2012	Mosojane		Young Strikers	
13 April 2012	Kgabosetso		Mogoditshane Fighters	
13 April 2012	Lobatse Stars		Mochudi Buffaloes	
13 April 2012	Tlokweng United		Killer Giants	
13 April 2012	Molapo Green Birds		Jwaneng Comets	
13 April 2012	Real Masters		Prisons XI	

== Round of 32 ==
Date	Home	Score	Away	Ground
14 April 2012	Great North Tigers		TASC	
14 April 2012	Killer Giants		Township Rollers	
14 April 2012	Young Strikers		Extension Gunners	
14 April 2012	Real Movers		Police XI	
14 April 2012	BR Highlanders		ECCO City Greens	
14 April 2012	Sankoyo Bush Bucks		BDF XI	
14 April 2012	No Mathata		Black Peril	
14 April 2012	Security Systems		Motlakase Power Dynamos	
14 April 2012	Molapo Green Birds	3-2	Nico United	
14 April 2012	Real Masters		BMC	
14 April 2012	Mogoditshane Fighters		TAFIC	
15 April 2012	XI Men		Uniao Flamengo Santos	
15 April 2012	Mochudi Buffaloes	1-2	Gaborone United	
16 April 2012	Peacemakers	0-2	Mochudi Centre Chiefs	

== Round of 16 ==
Date	Home	Score	Away	Ground
11 June 2012	Township Rollers	4-2	Mogoditshane Fighters	
12 June 2012	Police XI	0-3	ECCO City Greens	
12 June 2012	TASC	0-5	Mochudi Centre Chiefs	
12 June 2012	Notwane		Molapo Green Birds	
12 June 2012	No Mathata	0-8	BMC	
12 June 2012	Uniao Flamengo Santos		Miscellaneous	
12 June 2012	Motlakase Power Dynamos	0-1	Gaborone United	
13 June 2012	BDF XI	3-0	Extension Gunners	

== Quarterfinals ==
Date	Home	Score	Away	Ground
23 June 2012	Mochudi Centre Chiefs	3-2	ECCO City Greens	
23 June 2012	BMC	0-1	Township Rollers	
24 June 2012	BDF XI	4-3 aet.	Uniao Flamengo Santos	
23 June 2012	Molapo Green Birds	1-3	Gaborone United	

== Semifinals ==
Date	Home	Score	Away	Ground
21 July 2012	Mochudi Centre Chiefs	1-0	Township Rollers	
22 July 2012	BDF XI	1-2	Gaborone United	

== Final ==
Date	Winners	Score	Runner-up	Ground
5 August 2012	Gaborone United	0-0 (4-2 pen.)	Mochudi Centre Chiefs	Botswana National Stadium
