= 2017–18 Botswana Premier League =

Botswana Premier League
- Season: 2017–18
- Champions: Township Rollers
- Relegated: Gilport Lions; UF Santos; Tafic
- Champions League: Township Rollers
- Confederation Cup: Orapa United
- Top goalscorer: Thatayaone Kgamanyane (20 goals)
- Biggest home win: Sankoyo Bush Bucks 6-1 Gilport Lions (12 May 2018)
- Biggest away win: Gilport Lions 1-7 Jwaneng Galaxy (25 April 2018)
- Highest scoring: Police XI 4-5 Black Forest (14 April 2018)
- Longest winning run: Township Rollers (8)
- Longest unbeaten run: Township Rollers; Orapa United (13)
- Longest winless run: Gilport Lions (23)
- Longest losing run: Gilport Lions (7)

The 2017–18 Botswana Premier League was the 41st season of the Botswana Premier League, the top-tier football league in Botswana, since its establishment in 1978. The season started on 23 September 2017 and finished on 23 May 2018.

== Team summaries ==
=== Promotion and relegation ===
Nico United, Green Lovers F.C., and Mahalapye Hotspurs were relegated from the 2016–17 Botswana Premier League. They were replaced by three teams promoted from the Botswana First Division, the winners of the Northern group TAFIC F.C., the winners of the Southern group Sharps Shooting Stars, and playoff winners Uniao Flamengo Santos.

== Standings ==
| Pos | Team | Pld | W | D | L | GF | GA | GD | Pts | Qualification or relegation |
|---|---|---|---|---|---|---|---|---|---|---|
| 1 | Township Rollers (C, Q) | 30 | 20 | 6 | 4 | 57 | 31 | +26 | 66 | Qualification for 2018–19 CAF Champions League |
| 2 | Jwaneng Galaxy | 30 | 18 | 8 | 4 | 54 | 22 | +32 | 62 | |
| 3 | Orapa United | 30 | 14 | 10 | 6 | 44 | 27 | +17 | 52 | |
| 4 | Miscellaneous | 30 | 13 | 9 | 8 | 46 | 37 | +9 | 48 | |
| 5 | Gaborone United | 30 | 11 | 12 | 7 | 51 | 38 | +13 | 45 | |
| 6 | BDF XI | 30 | 10 | 12 | 8 | 40 | 29 | +11 | 42 | |
| 7 | Sharps Shooting Stars | 30 | 10 | 12 | 8 | 43 | 41 | +2 | 42 | |
| 8 | Black Forest | 30 | 10 | 11 | 9 | 28 | 28 | 0 | 41 | |
| 9 | Mochudi Centre Chiefs | 30 | 9 | 11 | 10 | 33 | 41 | −8 | 38 | |
| 10 | Extension Gunners | 30 | 9 | 10 | 11 | 34 | 33 | +1 | 37 | |
| 11 | Sankoyo Bush Bucks | 30 | 9 | 8 | 13 | 31 | 36 | −5 | 35 | |
| 12 | Security Systems | 30 | 9 | 8 | 13 | 26 | 36 | −10 | 35 | |
| 13 | Police XI | 30 | 8 | 11 | 11 | 39 | 50 | −11 | 35 | |
| 14 | Tafic (R) | 30 | 9 | 7 | 14 | 25 | 36 | −11 | 34 | |
| 15 | UF Santos (R) | 30 | 5 | 8 | 17 | 25 | 43 | −18 | 23 | |
| 16 | Gilport Lions (R) | 30 | 2 | 5 | 23 | 21 | 69 | −48 | 11 | |

Source: BPL
Rules for classification: 1) points; 2) goal difference; 3) number of goals scored.
(C) Champions; (Q) Qualified for the phase indicated; (R) Relegated

== See also ==
- 2017–18 Mascom Top 8 Cup
