= Lemponye Tshireletso =

Motswana footballer (born 1987)

Personal information
- Full name: Lemponye Tshireletso
- Date of birth: 26 August 1987 (age 39)
- Place of birth: Francistown, Botswana
- Height: 1.75 m (5 ft 9 in)
- Positions: Centre forward; second striker; left winger

Senior career*
Years	Team	Apps	(Gls)
2007–2008	Motlakase		
2008–2013	BDF XI		
2013–2016	Mochudi Centre Chiefs (Note: The stats for 2013–14 are unknown.)		(32+)
2016–2023	Township Rollers (Note: The stats for 2017–18, 2018–19, and 2020–21 are unknown.)		(26+)

International career
2009–2020	Botswana	64	(11)
- * Club domestic league appearances and goals

Lemponye Tshireletso (born 26 August 1987) is a Motswana former footballer who represented the Botswana national team from 2009 till 2020.

== International career ==
=== International goals ===
Scores and results list Botswana's goal tally first.

No	Date	Venue	Opponent	Score	Result	Competition
1.	16 March 2011	Maun Stadium, Maun, Botswana	Namibia	1–1	1–1	Friendly
2.	28 May 2012	Atatürk Olympic Stadium, Istanbul, Turkey	Iraq	1–1	1–1	Friendly
3.	15 August 2012	Molepolole Stadium, Molepolole, Botswana	Tanzania	1–1	3–3	Friendly
4.	15 August 2012	Molepolole Stadium, Molepolole, Botswana	Tanzania	2–2	3–3	Friendly
5.	6 February 2013	Rufaro Stadium, Harare, Zimbabwe	Zimbabwe	1–1	1–2	Friendly
6.	11 July 2013	Nkana Stadium, Kitwe, Zambia	Kenya	1–0	2–1	2013 COSAFA Cup
7.	27 July 2013	Molepolole Stadium, Molepolole, Botswana	Zambia	1–1	1–1	2014 African Nations Championship qualification
8.	30 September 2013	Botswana National Stadium, Gaborone, Botswana	Burkina Faso	1–0	1–0	Friendly
9.	1 July 2014	Botswana National Stadium, Gaborone, Botswana	Tanzania	2–1	4–2	Friendly
10.	14 July 2014	Botswana National Stadium, Gaborone, Botswana	Guinea-Bissau	1–0	2–0	2015 Africa Cup of Nations qualification
11.	14 July 2014	Botswana National Stadium, Gaborone, Botswana	Guinea-Bissau	2–0	2–0	2015 Africa Cup of Nations qualification

== Honours ==
=== Club ===
Mochudi Centre Chiefs

- Botswana Premier League: 2014–15, 2015–16 (Note: Township Rollers were docked 7 points for playing ineligible player Ofentse Nato. Miscellaneous SC and Police XI were each awarded 3 points in the decision and Centre Chiefs were awarded 2 points, finishing the season in first above Township Rollers.)

Township Rollers

- Botswana Premier League: 2016–17, 2017-18, 2018–19
- Mascom Top 8 Cup: 2017-18
- Botswana FA Challenge Cup: runner-up 2019

=== Individual ===
- Botswana Premier League Golden Boot: 2015
