= 2015–16 Botswana Premier League =

Botswana Premier League
- Season: 2015–16
- Champions: Township Rollers
- Relegated: BR Highlanders; Motlakase Power Dynamos; Satmos
- Champions League: Township Rollers
- Confederation Cup: Orapa United
- Matches: 240
- Goals: 640 (2.67 per match)
- Top goalscorer: Tendai Nyamadzawo (19 goals)
- Biggest home win: Township Rollers 9-1 Satmos (27 September 2015)
- Biggest away win: Satmos 1-9 Gilport Lions (8 May 2016)
- Highest scoring: 2 matches: Township Rollers 9-1 Satmos (27 September 2015); Satmos 1-9 Gilport Lions (8 May 2016)
- Longest winning run: Mochudi Centre Chiefs; Township Rollers (5)
- Longest unbeaten run: Orapa United (20)
- Longest winless run: Satmos (24)
- Longest losing run: Satmos (9)
- All statistics correct as of 11 August 2016.

The 2015–16 Botswana Premier League was the 39th season of the Botswana Premier League since its establishment in 1978. Township Rollers won their 13th league title after defeating Centre Chiefs, 5–1, in the championship playoff. The playoff was announced following controversy as to who the rightful champion was following a series of point deductions and appeals. Township Rollers were docked 10 points for using ineligible player Ofentse Nato, dropping from 70 points to 60 and into second place with the decision. Following a series of appeals by both Township Rollers and Centre Chiefs, the Botswana Football Association decided to hold a championship game at the National Stadium on June 15, although the match was later postponed and played on August 11 at Molepolole Stadium in Molepolole.

Motlakase Power Dynamos, BR Highlanders and Satmos finished in the bottom three spots, respectively, and were relegated to the Botswana First Division for the 2016–17 season.

== Team summaries ==
Locations of teams in the 2014–15 Botswana Premier League

=== Promotion and relegation ===
Teams promoted from Botswana First Division North and South

- Jwaneng Galaxy
- Green Lovers
- Miscellaneous SC

Teams relegated to Botswana First Division North and South

- ECCO City Greens
- Letlapeng FC
- Notwane

=== Stadiums and locations ===
Team	Location	Stadium	Stadium capacity
Botswana Defence Force XI FC	Gaborone	SSKB Stadium	5,000
Botswana Railways Highlanders	Molepolole	Molepolole Stadium	6,600
Extension Gunners	Lobatse	Lobatse Stadium	22,000
F.C. Satmos	Selebi-Phikwe	Selebi-Phikwe Stadium	9,000
Gaborone United S.C.	Gaborone	Botswana National Stadium	22,500
Jwaneng Galaxy	Jwaneng	Jwaneng Town Council Stadium	
Gilport Lions F.C.	Lobatse	Lobatse Stadium	22,000
Green Lovers	Orapa	Itekeng Stadium	5,000
Miscellaneous SC	Orapa	Itekeng Stadium	5,000
Mochudi Centre Chiefs SC	Gaborone	Botswana National Stadium	22,500
Motlakase Power Dynamos	Palapye	Palapye Stadium	1,000
Nico United	Selebi-Phikwe	Selebi-Phikwe Stadium	9,000
Orapa United	Orapa	Itekeng Stadium	5,000
Police XI	Otse	Otse Stadium	2,000
Sankoyo Bush Bucks FC	Maun	Maun Stadium	
Township Rollers F.C.	Gaborone	Botswana National Stadium	22,500

== League table ==
Pos	Team	Pld	W	D	L	GF	GA	GD	Pts	Qualification or relegation
1	Mochudi Centre Chiefs (Q)	30	17	11	2	59	23	+36	64 (Note: Township Rollers were docked 7 points for playing ineligible player Ofentse Nato. Miscellaneous SC and Police XI were each awarded 3 points in the decision and Centre Chiefs were awarded 2 points.)	Qualification for Championship Playoff
2	Township Rollers (C, Q)	30	20	7	3	66	16	+50	60	Qualification for Championship Playoff
3	Orapa United	30	17	9	4	48	17	+31	60	
4	BDF XI	30	16	5	9	44	31	+13	53	
5	Gaborone United	30	15	7	8	31	24	+7	52	
6	Miscellaneous SC	30	12	8	10	41	42	−1	47	
7	Jwaneng Galaxy	30	12	9	9	49	33	+16	45	
8	Police XI	30	12	5	13	35	32	+3	44	
9	Extension Gunners	30	11	7	12	43	35	+8	40	
10	Gilport Lions	30	11	6	13	41	34	+7	39	
11	Nico United	30	8	8	14	34	42	−8	35 (Note: Satmos were deducted 3 points and Nico United awarded 3 points due to the use of ineligible player Sadiki Takunda.)	
12	Sankoyo Bush Bucks	30	9	8	13	38	48	−10	35	
13	Green Lovers	30	9	3	18	35	62	−27	30	
14	Motlakase Power Dynamos (R)	30	7	6	17	29	65	−36	27	Relegation to Botswana First Division North and South
15	BR Highlanders (R)	30	2	15	13	22	50	−28	21	Relegation to Botswana First Division North and South
16	Satmos (R)	30	2	6	22	25	86	−61	9	Relegation to Botswana First Division North and South

Updated to match(es) played on 8 May 2016. Source: https://www.soccerway.com/botswana/premier-league-2014-2015/results/
Rules for classification: 1) points; 2) goal difference; 3) number of goals scored.
(C) Champions; (Q) Qualified for the phase indicated; (R) Relegated

== Championship ==
Township Rollers defeated Centre Chiefs 5–1 to win their 13th league title. With the win, Township Rollers gained entry into the 2017 CAF Champions League.

11 August 2016
16:00 UTC+2

Centre Chiefs	1–5	Township Rollers
Ncenga (o.g.)	Report	25', 43' Mandaza (o.g.) Kgaswane; Boy; Mathumo

Molepolole Stadium, Molepolole

== Results ==
All teams play in a double round robin system (home and away).

Home \ Away	BDF	BRH	CEN	EXT	GAB	GFC	GIL	GRE	MIS	MPD	NIC	ORA	PXI	SBB	SAT	TOW
BDF XI		1–1	1–1	0–0	1–0	0–3	0–1	0–2	1–3	7–1	2–1	2–0	0–1	0–0	1–0	1–1
BR Highlanders	0–2		0–4	1–1	0–1	2–2	1–3	3–3	0–4	0–0	0–0	1–2	0–0	3–3	0–1	1–1
Centre Chiefs	3–0	5–0		3–0	1–1	2–1	0–0	1–0	2–2	3–0	3–1	1–0	1–1	1–1	6–1	1–1
Extension Gunners	0–2	5–0	0–1		2–1	1–2	2–0	0–1	3–0	2–0	5–0	1–1	0–3	2–2	3–1	0–2
Gaborone United	1–2	0–0	0–2	1–1		2–1	0–0	1–0	1–0	0–1	1–0	0–1	1–0	1–0	1–1	0–0
Galaxy FC	0–3	0–0	0–0	1–0	1–2		1–0	5–2	1–2	5–0	1–0	1–1	2–0	2–0	3–2	0–0
Gilport Lions	0–1	1–1	1–1	2–2	0–2	3–1		2–1	0–1	5–0	1–2	1–3	1–4	0–1	1–0	2–0
Green Lovers	1–2	0–2	1–2	1–3	0–1	0–4	1–3		1–2	0–2	3–2	1–5	2–1	4–3	1–0	0–1
Miscellaneous	2–1	0–0	3–4	0–0	1–3	2–2	2–0	5–1		0–1	0–4	0–2	1–0	4–3	3–1	0–2
Motlakase Power Dynamos	0–2	2–1	1–4	0–2	1–1	1–1	0–1	2–4	1–1		2–1	1–1	1–2	1–2	1–1	1–2
Nico United	0–1	1–1	1–1	3–1	4–0	3–0	1–1	0–0	0–0	1–0		1–1	2–2	2–1	2–4	0–1
Orapa United	1–0	3–0	0–0	3–1	2–1	0–0	0–1	4–0	1–0	3–0	3–0		2–0	2–2	1–0	0–0
Police XI	2–3	0–0	1–2	1–0	0–1	2–1	2–1	0–2	1–2	4–0	1–0	0–0		3–2	1–0	0–1
Sankoyo Bush Bucks	1–3	1–0	2–1	1–2	0–3	2–1	2–1	0–0	0–0	2–4	1–0	0–1	2–1		4–1	0–1
Satmos	1–4	2–2	0–1	0–3	2–2	0–6	1–9	0–2	1–1	3–5	0–2	0–5	1–2	0–0		0–5
Township Rollers	4–1	1–2	3–2	2–1	0–1	1–1	1–0	6–1	5–0	4–0	5–0	2–0	1–0	4–0	9–1	

Updated to match(es) played on 8 May 2016. Source: soccerway.com
Legend: Blue = home team win; Yellow = draw; Red = away team win.

=== Results by round ===
Team ╲ Round	1	2	3	4	5	6	7	8	9	10	11	12	13	14	15	16	17	18	19	20	21	22	23	24	25	26	27	28	29	30
BDF XI	L	W	W	W	D	W	D	W	W	W	W	L	L	L	W	D	L	W	L	W	W	W	L	W	W	D	L	D	W	L
BR Highlanders	L	D	W	D	D	D	D	L	D	L	L	D	L	L	L	L	D	D	W	L	D	D	L	L	D	D	L	D	D	D
Centre Chiefs	W	W	L	D	W	D	W	D	D	W	W	L	W	D	W	W	W	D	D	W	W	W	W	W	D	W	D	D	W	D
Extension Gunners	W	W	W	W	L	D	L	L	L	L	L	L	L	W	W	D	D	W	D	D	W	L	L	W	L	D	W	L	D	W
Gaborone United	W	D	L	L	W	D	W	W	D	L	L	W	W	L	W	D	D	L	D	W	L	W	W	W	L	W	W	D	D	W
Galaxy FC	L	W	D	L	L	D	D	D	W	W	L	L	W	L	L	W	W	D	W	W	D	D	W	L	W	W	L	W	D	D
Gilport Lions	L	L	L	D	L	W	L	L	D	W	W	W	L	L	W	D	D	L	D	L	W	W	W	L	L	D	W	L	W	W
Green Lovers	W	L	L	W	W	L	W	L	W	L	L	W	L	L	L	D	L	D	L	D	L	W	L	L	L	L	W	L	L	W
Miscellaneous	D	W	W	W	L	D	L	D	W	L	W	W	L	W	W	L	D	W	D	L	L	L	L	W	W	L	W	D	D	D
Motlakase Power Dynamos	D	L	L	L	L	L	L	D	D	L	D	L	D	W	L	W	L	L	W	L	L	W	L	W	L	W	L	W	D	L
Nico United	L	L	L	D	W	D	W	L	D	W	W	W	W	D	L	D	L	L	L	L	D	L	W	W	L	L	L	D	L	D
Orapa United	W	L	W	D	W	D	W	W	D	W	D	W	W	W	D	W	W	W	W	D	D	W	W	L	W	D	D	W	L	L
Police XI	W	D	W	W	W	W	L	W	L	L	L	L	L	W	W	L	D	W	L	W	W	L	W	L	D	D	L	L	L	D
Sankoyo Bush Bucks	L	L	W	L	L	L	D	W	L	W	W	L	W	D	L	D	D	D	W	D	L	L	L	W	D	L	D	W	W	L
Satmos	L	D	L	L	L	L	L	L	L	L	L	D	D	D	L	L	D	L	D	L	L	L	L	L	W	L	W	L	L	L
Township Rollers	W	W	D	D	W	W	W	W	D	W	W	W	W	W	D	D	W	D	L	W	W	L	W	L	W	W	D	W	W	W

Updated to match(es) played on 8 May 2016. Source: Soccerway
W = Win; D = Draw; L = Lose

== Positions by round ==
Team ╲ Round	1	2	3	4	5	6	7	8	9	10	11	12	13	14	15	16	17	18	19	20	21	22	23	24	25	26	27	28	29	30
Centre Chiefs	1	1	5	6	3	4	3	5	5	4	3	4	4	3	3	3	3	3	3	3	3	3	2	2	3	2	2	3	2	1
Township Rollers	2	2	3	5	8	5	1	1	1	1	1	1	1	1	1	1	1	1	2	1	1	1	1	1	1	1	1	1	1	2
Orapa United	7	9	7	7	6	7	5	4	4	3	4	3	2	2	2	2	2	2	1	2	2	2	3	3	2	3	3	2	3	3
BDF XI	15	8	6	4	5	2	4	3	2	2	2	2	3	4	4	4	4	4	4	4	4	4	4	4	4	4	4	4	4	4
Gaborone United	3	4	9	10	11	11	8	6	7	7	8	8	7	8	7	7	7	7	7	7	7	6	6	5	6	5	5	5	5	5
Miscellaneous	8	5	4	3	4	6	7	8	6	6	6	5	6	5	5	5	5	5	5	6	6	7	8	7	7	8	6	7	7	6
Galaxy FC	11	7	8	11	12	12	12	13	10	9	10	12	9	11	12	10	9	10	8	8	8	8	7	8	8	6	7	6	6	7
Police XI	5	6	2	2	1	1	2	2	3	5	5	6	8	7	6	6	6	6	6	5	5	5	5	6	5	7	8	8	8	8
Extension Gunners	5	3	1	1	2	3	6	7	8	8	9	11	13	10	9	9	10	8	9	9	9	9	9	9	9	9	9	9	9	9
Gilport Lions	14	16	16	14	15	13	15	14	14	14	13	10	12	13	10	11	11	13	12	13	12	13	11	12	12	12	11	12	11	10
Nico United	10	15	15	13	10	10	10	10	11	10	7	7	5	6	8	8	8	9	10	11	10	10	10	10	10	10	10	11	12	11
Sankoyo Bush Bucks	11	14	11	12	13	14	13	12	13	12	10	13	9	9	11	12	12	11	11	10	11	11	12	11	11	11	12	10	10	12
Green Lovers	4	10	12	8	7	8	9	9	9	11	12	9	11	12	13	13	13	12	13	12	13	12	13	13	13	13	13	13	13	13
Motlakase Power Dynamos	8	12	14	16	16	16	16	16	16	16	16	16	16	15	15	14	15	15	15	15	15	15	15	14	14	14	14	14	14	14
BR Highlanders	16	13	10	9	9	9	11	11	12	13	14	14	14	14	14	15	14	14	14	14	14	14	14	15	15	15	15	15	15	15
Satmos	13	11	13	15	14	15	14	15	15	15	15	15	15	16	16	16	16	16	16	16	16	16	16	16	16	16	16	16	16	16

Leader
Relegation to Botswana First Division

Updated to match(es) played on 8 May 2016. Source: Soccerway
