= 2011 Botswana FA Cup =

2011 Botswana Football Association Challenge Cup
Tournament details
- Country: Botswana
- Dates: 5 February – 30 April 2011

Final positions
- Champions: Extension Gunners (3rd title)
- Runners-up: Motlakase Power Dynamos

Tournament statistics
- Matches played: 64

The 2011 FA Challenge Cup was the 44th edition of the FA Challenge Cup, Botswana's premier football knockout tournament. It was sponsored by Coca-Cola and was known as the Coca-Cola Cup for sponsorship reasons. It started with the qualification round on 5 February 2011 and concluded with the final on 30 April 2011. The winner qualified for the 2013 CAF Confederation Cup.

Township Rollers were the defending champions but were eliminated by Uniao Flamengo Santos on penalties in the semifinals. Extension Gunners went on to win the title for a third time, ending a 17-year trophy drought.

== Qualification round ==
Date	Home	Score	Away	Ground
5 February	Kumakwane Checkers		Moritshane Lions	
6 February	Wonder Sporting		Rolling Boys	

== Extra preliminary round ==
Date	Home	Score	Away	Ground
12 February	Amakhosi	1-1 (5-3 pens.)	Tonota	
12 February	Atlantic Swallows		Kumakwane Checkers/Moritshane Lions	
12 February	Bokaa Pirates		Mmopane Green Birds	
12 February	BVI		Wonder Sporting/Rolling Boys	
12 February	Combination Stars		Kazungula Fighters	
12 February	Ghanzi Terrors		Maun Tigers	
12 February	Granada		Queens Park Rangers	
12 February	Jwaneng Fighters		Sand Dunes	
12 February	Lehututu Golden Arrows		Kang Western Swallows	
12 February	Matlala Cosmos		SC Taipei	
12 February	Maun Heroes		CTO	
12 February	No Mathata		Stone Breakers	
12 February	Peace Makers		Tip Toe Boys	
13 February	Kanye Swallows		Magotlhwane Young Brothers	
13 February	Modipane United	2-1	Queens Happy Hearts	

== Preliminary round ==
Date	Home	Score	Away	Ground
19 February	No Mathata	2-2 (3-5 pens.)	Miscellaneous	
19 February	Peace Makers	3-2	FC Satmos	
19 February	Modipane United	0-0 (5-4 pen.)	Mahalapye United Hotspurs	
19 February	Amakhosi	2-3	BR Highlanders	
19 February	TASC	4-3	Queens Park Rangers	
19 February	Jwaneng Fighters	1-2	Mogoditshane Fighters	
19 February	Ghanzi Terrors	2-2 (4-1 pens.)	Mathaithai	
19 February	Mmopane Green Birds	1-3	Letlapeng	
19 February	SC Taipei	1-6	Young Strikers	
19 February	Great North Tigers	2-2 (10-9 pens.)	Megacom	
19 February	Maun Heroes	2-1	Orapa Bucs	
20 February	Masitaoka	0-1	BVI	
20 February	Real Masters	2-0	Orapa Wanderers	
20 February	Prisons XI	1-0	Atlantic Swallows	
23 February	Kanye Swallows		Naughty Boys	
27 February	Black Peril	4-1^{1}	Kang Western Swallows	

^{1} This was a replay. The tie had originally been contested on the 19th, with Black Peril winning 4–0, but the result was annulled.

== Round of 32 ==
Date	Home	Score	Away	Ground
26 February	Ghanzi Terrors	0-3	BMC	
26 February	BR Highlanders	0-0 (3-4 pens.)	Uniao Flamengo Santos	
26 February	Peace Makers	1-4	Extension Gunners	
26 February	Great North Tigers	1-3	Mochudi Centre Chiefs	
26 February	Letlapeng	0-1	Motlakase Power Dynamos	
26 February	Maun Terrors	1-2	Jwaneng Comets	
26 February	Kanye Swallows	4-1	Boteti Young Fighters	
26 February	BVI	0-3	Nico United	
26 February	Real Masters	0-2	Notwane	
26 February	Miscellaneous	^{2}	TAFIC	
27 February	Young Strikers	0-2	BDF XI	
27 February	Mogoditshane Fighters	1-1 (3-4 pens.)	Gaborone United	
27 February	TASC	0-3	Township Rollers	
27 February	Prisons XI	0-3	Killer Giants	
27 February	Modipane United	2-2 (5-4 pens.)	Police XI	
2 March	Black Peril	1-2	ECCO City Greens	

^{2} The tie was awarded to TAFIC after the match was halted due to a pitch invasion with them leading 1–0.

== Round of 16 ==
Date	Home	Score	Away	Ground
5 March	TAFIC	0-2	BMC	
5 March	Extension Gunners	1-0	Nico United	
5 March	Mochudi Centre Chiefs	9-0	Kanye Swallows	
5 March	Motlakase Power Dynamos	1-1 (6-5 pens.)	Modipane United	
5 March	BDF XI	1-0	Jwaneng Comets	
6 March	Uniao Flamengo Santos	3-0	Gaborone United	
6 March	Killer Giants	1-2	Notwane	
15 March	Township Rollers	5-1	ECCO City Greens	

== Quarterfinals ==
Date	Home	Score	Away	Ground
19 March	BMC	1-1 (2-3 pens.)	Motlakase Power Dynamos	
19 March	Extension Gunners	1-1 (6-5 pens.)	Notwane	
19 March	Township Rollers	1-1 (3-4 pens.)	Uniao Flamengo Santos	
29 March	Mochudi Centre Chiefs	1-0	BDF XI	

== Semifinals ==
Date	Home	Score	Away	Ground
16 April	Extension Gunners	1-0	Mochudi Centre Chiefs	
16 April	Uniao Flamengo Santos	0-0 (2-4 pens.)	Motlakase Power Dynamos	

== Final ==
Date	Winners	Score	Runner-up	Ground
30 April	Extension Gunners	3-1	Motlakase Power Dynamos	Botswana National Stadium

== Top scorers ==
THABISO MAJAGA-NO MATHATA FC 9goals

JURY FANE - PEACE MAKERS FC SEKHANA KOKO-TOWNSHIP ROLLERS FC DUNCAN KGOPOLELO-WONDER SPORTING
