= 2016–17 Botswana Premier League =

Botswana Premier League
- Season: 2016–17
- Champions: Township Rollers
- Relegated: Green Lovers; Mahalapye United Hotspurs; Nico United
- Champions League: Township Rollers
- Confederation Cup: Jwaneng Galaxy
- Matches: 232
- Goals: 538 (2.32 per match)
- Top goalscorer: Terrence Mandaza (17 goals)
- Biggest home win: 2 matches: Mochudi Centre Chiefs 5-0 Nico United (10 February 2017); Mochudi Centre Chiefs 5-0 Miscellaneous (14 May 2017)
- Biggest away win: Mahalapye United Hotspurs 0-5 Orapa United (15 April 2017)
- Highest scoring: 2 matches: Mahalapye United Hotspurs 3-5 Security Systems (7 May 2017); Green Lovers 2-6 Township Rollers (16 May 2017)
- Longest winning run: Township Rollers (10)
- Longest unbeaten run: Jwaneng Galaxy (24)
- Longest winless run: Green Lovers (11)
- Longest losing run: Nico United (7)
- All statistics correct as of 20 May 2017.

The 2016–17 Botswana Premier League was the 40th season of the Botswana Premier League since its establishment in 1966. Township Rollers clinched their second straight league title and 14th overall.

== Team summaries ==
Locations of teams in the 2014–15 Botswana Premier League

=== Promotion and relegation ===
Teams promoted from Botswana First Division North and South

- Black Forest F.C.
- Mahalapye United Hotspurs
- Security Systems

Teams relegated to Botswana First Division North and South

- BR Highlanders
- Motlakase Power Dynamos
- Satmos

=== Stadiums and locations ===
Team	Location	Stadium	Stadium capacity
Black Forest FC	Mmankgodi		
Botswana Defence Force XI FC	Gaborone	SSKB Stadium	5,000
Extension Gunners	Lobatse	Lobatse Stadium	22,000
Gaborone United S.C.	Gaborone	Botswana National Stadium	22,500
Jwaneng Galaxy	Jwaneng	Jwaneng Town Council Stadium	
Gilport Lions F.C.	Lobatse	Lobatse Stadium	22,000
Green Lovers	Orapa	Itekeng Stadium	5,000
Miscellaneous SC	Serowe	Serowe Sports Complex	6,000
Mochudi Centre Chiefs SC	Gaborone	Botswana National Stadium	22,500
Nico United	Selebi-Phikwe	Selebi-Phikwe Stadium	9,000
Orapa United	Orapa	Itekeng Stadium	5,000
Police XI	Otse	Otse Stadium	2,000
Sankoyo Bush Bucks	Maun	Maun Stadium	
Security Systems	Gaborone		
Township Rollers	Gaborone	Botswana National Stadium	22,500
Mahalapye United Hotspurs	Mahalapye		

== League table ==
Pos	Team	Pld	W	D	L	GF	GA	GD	Pts	Qualification or relegation
1	Township Rollers (C, Q)	30	19	9	2	59	18	+41	66	Qualification for 2018 CAF Champions League
2	Galaxy	30	16	10	4	47	23	+24	58	
3	Orapa United	30	13	12	5	43	24	+19	51	
4	Extension Gunners	30	11	14	5	31	25	+6	47	
5	Gaborone United	30	12	10	8	36	25	+11	46	
6	Security Systems	30	12	9	9	36	32	+4	45	
7	Centre Chiefs	30	11	8	11	49	39	+10	41	
8	BDF XI	30	10	10	10	33	29	+4	40	
9	Black Forest F.C.	30	8	15	7	30	28	+2	39	
10	Gilport Lions	30	10	9	11	27	35	−8	39	
11	Miscellaneous	30	8	9	13	31	39	−8	33	
12	Sankoyo Bush Bucks	30	8	9	13	28	37	−9	33	
13	Police XI	30	7	11	12	26	32	−6	32	
14	Nico United (R)	30	9	5	16	37	55	−18	32	Relegation to Botswana First Division North and South
15	Green Lovers (R)	30	4	9	17	23	55	−32	21	Relegation to Botswana First Division North and South
16	Mahalapye United Hotspurs (R)	30	4	7	19	20	60	−40	19	Relegation to Botswana First Division North and South

Updated to match(es) played on 27 May 2017. Source: https://www.soccerway.com/botswana/premier-league-2016-2017/results/
Rules for classification: 1) points; 2) goal difference; 3) number of goals scored.
(C) Champions; (Q) Qualified for the phase indicated; (R) Relegated

== Positions by round ==
Leader
Relegation to Botswana First Division

Team ╲ Round	1	2	3	4	5	6	7	8	9	10	11	12	13	14	15	16	17	18	19	20	21	22	23	24	25	26	27	28	29	30
Township Rollers	2	1	2	1	3	2	3	4	4	2	2	2	2	1	1	2	2	1	1	1	1	1	1	1	2	2	2	1	1	1
Galaxy	6	9	12	15	16	13	12	11	7	5	5	4	3	2	2	1	1	2	2	2	2	2	2	2	1	1	1	2	2	2
Orapa United	1	1	3	2	2	1	2	1	1	1	1	1	1	3	3	3	3	3	3	3	3	3	3	3	3	3	3	3	3	3
Extension Gunners	4	4	1	3	1	3	1	2	2	6	4	6	7	6	5	6	4	4	5	7	7	4	4	4	5	4	4	4	4	
Gaborone United	3	3	4	5	10	11	7	10	5	4	6	5	4	5	6	7	8	9	10	10	9	10	9	6	7	5	5	5	5	
Security Systems	6	5	9	10	12	8	8	6	9	9	11	8	6	7	8	10	10	8	7	6	5	6	7	8	8	8	6	7	6	
Centre Chiefs	4	7	13	13	7	10	11	9	13	14	14	12	10	11	11	9	7	5	8	8	8	9	10	9	9	9	9	8	7	
BDF XI	6	11	5	6	4	5	6	7	8	8	10	7	8	8	7	4	5	7	6	4	4	5	6	7	6	6	8	6	8	
Black Forest	6	8	11	4	8	6	5	3	3	3	3	3	5	4	4	5	6	6	4	5	6	7	5	5	4	7	7	9	9	
Gilport Lions	6	5	7	14	9	12	13	13	11	11	12	14	13	10	10	12	11	11	11	12	11	12	12	13	13	12	11	10	10	
Sankoyo Bush Bucks	6	9	14	7	5	4	4	5	6	7	8	10	12	14	12	11	12	12	12	11	12	13	13	14	12	13	13	11	11	
Police XI	14	15	16	16	12	14	14	14	14	12	9	11	9	9	9	8	9	10	9	9	10	8	8	10	10	10	10	12	12	
Miscellaneous	15	16	10	11	14	9	9	12	12	13	13	13	14	12	13	13	13	13	13	13	13	11	11	11	11	11	12	13	13	
Nico United	16	13	6	11	6	7	10	8	10	10	7	9	11	13	14	14	14	14	14	14	14	14	14	12	14	14	14	14	14	
Green Lovers	6	14	8	8	11	15	16	16	16	16	16	16	16	15	15	15	15	16	16	16	15	16	15	16	16	16	16	15	15	
Mahalapye Hotspurs	6	11	15	9	15	16	15	15	15	15	15	15	15	16	16	16	16	15	15	15	16	15	16	15	15	15	15	16	16	

Updated to match(es) played on 20 May 2017. Source: Soccerway
