= 2015–16 Mascom Top 8 Cup =

Football tournament season in Botswana

Mascom Top 8 Season 5

Tournament details
- Country: Botswana
- Dates: 29 October 2015-23 April 2016
- Teams: 8

Final positions
- Champions: Orapa United (1st title)
- Runners-up: Township Rollers

Tournament statistics
- Matches played: 13
- Goals scored: 35 (2.69 per match)
- Top goal scorer(s): Maano Ditshupo; Ronald Chikomo (4 goals)

Awards
- Best player: Maano Ditshupo

The 2015–16 Mascom Top 8 Cup, also known as the Mascom Top 8 Season 5, was the fifth edition of the Mascom Top 8 Cup. It was played from 29 October 2015 to 23 April 2016 by the top eight teams from the 2014-15 Botswana Premier League. It was won by Orapa United.

Gaborone United were the defending champions but were eliminated by BDF XI in the quarterfinals. Orapa United went on to win the tournament, making them the first ever northern team to win the Mascom Top 8 Cup.

== History ==
The 2015–16 Mascom Top 8 Cup was the only domestic tournament played in Botswana since the FA Cup was not contested. The winner qualified to represent Botswana in the 2017 CAF Confederation Cup. This honour was won by Orapa United.

== Prize money ==
- Champions: P1 200 000
- Runners up: P550 000
- Semifinalists: P300 000
- Quarterfinalists: P170 000

== Format ==
The quarterfinals and semifinals were played over two legs both home and away, with only one final in a predetermined venue. Three points were awarded for a win, one point for a draw and none for a loss. Aggregate score was used to determine the winner of a round. Where the aggregate score was equal away goals were used to pick out the victor and if those were equal the tied teams went into a penalty shootout. There was no quarterfinal draw. The teams were seeded based on their position in the table, with the first placed team facing off against the eighth placed team.

== Participants ==
Team	Location	League position
Mochudi Centre Chiefs	Mochudi	1
Orapa United	Orapa	2
Township Rollers	Gaborone	3
Gaborone United	Gaborone	4
BDF XI	Mogoditshane	5
Extension Gunners	Lobatse	6
Police XI	Otse	7
BMC	Lobatse	8

== Quarter-finals ==
First legs
Date	Home	Score	Away
October 29	Orapa United	1-1	Extension Gunners
October 30	BMC	2-2	Mochudi Centre Chiefs
October 31	Township Rollers	4-2	Police XI
November 1	Gaborone United	0-1	BDF XI

Second legs
Date	Home	Score	Away
November 20	Extension Gunners	1-3	Orapa United
November 21	BDF XI	2-0	Gaborone United
November 22	Police XI	1-0	Township Rollers
November 23	Mochudi Centre Chiefs	1-0	BMC

== Semi-finals ==
The draw for the semi-finals was conducted on

First legs
Date	Home	Score	Away
February 19	Mochudi Centre Chiefs	1-3	Township Rollers
February 20	Orapa United	1-1	BDF XI

Second legs
Date	Home	Score	Away
March 11	BDF XI	1-1 (3-5 pen.)	Orapa United
March 12	Mochudi Centre Chiefs	2-0	Mochudi Centre Chiefs

== Final ==
Final
Date	Winners	Score	Runners up
April 23	Orapa United	3-1	Township Rollers

== Awards ==
- Top goalscorer | (Botswana) Maano Ditshupo (4 goals) | Township Rollers

(Zambia) Ronald Chikomo (4 goals) | Orapa United

- Player of the tournament | (Botswana) Maano Ditshupo | Township Rollers
- Supporters' player of the tournament | (Botswana) Segolame Boy | Township Rollers
- Goalkeeper of the tournament | (Botswana) Mosimanegape Robert | Orapa United
- Supporters' goal of the tournament | (Botswana) Betsho Pius | Police XI
- Coach of the tournament | (Zimbabwe) Madinda Ndlovu | Orapa United
- Referee of the tournament | (Botswana) Tirelo Mositwane
- Assistant referee of the tournament | (Botswana) Mogomotsi Morakile
