= Maano Ditshupo =

Motswana Footballer

Personal information
- Full name: Maano Ditshupo
- Date of birth: 20 January 1985 (age 41)
- Place of birth: Serowe
- Height: 1.74 m (5 ft 8 1/2 in)
- Positions: Defensive midfielder; central midfielder

Team information
- Current team: Morupule Wanderes
- Number: 22

Senior career*
Years	Team	Apps	(Gls)
2005–2007	Satmos		
2007-2008	Lisburn Distillery		
2008-2012	Extension Gunners		
2012-2022	Township Rollers		
2022-	Morupule Wanderers		

International career^{‡}
2018-	Botswana	6	(0)
- * Club domestic league appearances and goals as of 29 August 2009 ‡ National team caps and goals as of 4 October 2019

Maano Ditshupo (born 20 January 1985) is a Motswana footballer playing for Township Rollers in the Botswana Premier League. He is a full Botswana international, having made six appearances for the Zebras.

Considered one of Botswana's best talents of all time, Ditshupo started playing football at a very young age and was part of a team called Elden Brothers which included players living in the same ward as him. He made his professional debut with Maun Terrors and later moved to Satmos. He played only one season for the Selibe-Phikwe giants before they loaned him to Northern Irish club Lisburn Distillery when he went to visit his sister in Northern Ireland. Upon returning to Botswana Ditshupo joined Botswana Premier League giants Extension Gunners and truly became a household name, winning one FA Cup and earning his first national team cap.

During his stay at the Peleng club he greatly impressed Township Rollers, who signed him in 2012. With them he would win five Premier Leagues and one Mascom Top 8 Cup. Given the captain's armband in 2015, Ditshupo led Rollers to four successive league titles, a cup and a historic CAF Champions League group stage appearance. He is considered one of Rollers'greatest ever captains.

== International career ==
Ditshupo made his Botswana debut on 4 August 2010 in an international friendly against Zimbabwe, which Botswana win 2–0.

== Honours ==
=== Club ===
Extension Gunners

- FA Cup:1

2011

Township Rollers

- Botswana Premier League:5

2013-14, 2015-16, 2016-17, 2017-18, 2018-19

- Mascom Top 8 Cup:1

2017-18

=== Individual ===
- Mascom Top 8 Cup Top Goalscorer: 2016
- Mascom Top 8 Cup Player of the Tournament: 2016, 2018
- FUB Team of the Year: 2016, 2017
