= Daniel Nare =

Motswana football manager

Personal information
- Place of birth: Botswana

Senior career*
Years	Team	Apps	(Gls)
- Gilport Lions FC

Managerial career
- Gilport Lions FC
- Letlapeng FC
- Extension Gunners FC
- Miscellaneous SC Serowe
- Orapa United FC
- Security Systems FC
- * Club domestic league appearances and goals

Daniel Nare is a Motswana football manager who last managed Security Systems FC.

== Life and career ==
Nare was born in Botswana. He has been nicknamed "Chicco". He played for Gilport Lions FC under Zimbabwean manager Clever Hunda. He was appointed manager of Extension Gunners FC. He was regarded to have performed well while managing the club. After that, he was appointed manager of Gilport Lions FC. He helped the club achieve second place in the league. He was awarded the 2012 Botswana Premier League Coach of the Season. He was described as "considered a future Zebras coach after he blazed the trail in stylish fashion".

After that, he was appointed manager of Letlapeng FC. He managed the club for three games before resigning. After that, he returned as manager of Extension Gunners FC. After that, he was appointed manager of Miscellaneous SC Serowe. He helped the club achieve their best start to a league season after eight games. After that, he was appointed manager of Orapa United FC. He helped the club reach the final of the Mascom Top 8 Cup. After that, he was appointed manager of Security Systems FC. He was tasked with helping the club avoid relegation.
