= Kobamelo Kebaikanye =

Motswana footballer

Personal information
- Full name: Kobamelo Kebaikanye
- Date of birth: 27 August 1991 (age 35)
- Place of birth: Seherelela
- Height: 1.67 m (5 ft 5 1/2 in)
- Position: Left winger

Team information
- Current team: Orapa United
- Number: 11

Senior career*
Years	Team	Apps	(Gls)
2009–2010	Molepolole New Town Highlanders		
2010–2016	Township Rollers		
2016–2017	BDF XI (loan)		
2017–	Orapa United		

International career^{‡}
2018–	Botswana	5	(0)
- * Club domestic league appearances and goals as of 29 August 2009 ‡ National team caps and goals as of 4 October 2019

Kobamelo Kebaikanye (born 27 August 1991) is a Motswana footballer playing for Orapa United in the Botswana Premier League and the Botswana national football team.

== Career ==
Kebaikanye began his career at Molepolole New Town Highlanders in the KRFA Division One. Although he stayed just one season with the Division One side, he impressed Township Rollers and made the switch to the Premier League in 2010. There he quickly established himself as one of the most fearsome wingers in the league, mainly due to his terrifying pace and dribbling down the flank. He was loaned to fellow Premier League team BDF XI for the 2016–17 season and sold to Orapa United upon his return.

== Honours ==
=== Club ===
Township Rollers

- Botswana Premier League:3

2010–11, 2013–14, 2015–16

- Mascom Top 8 Cup:1

2011–12

Orapa United

- FA Cup:1

2018–19
