= 2017–18 Botswana First Division North =

Botswana First Division North
- Season: 2017-18
- Champions: BR Highlanders
- Promoted: Eleven Angels; Palapye All-Stars
- Relegated: Maphatshwa; Mahalapye United Hotspurs

The 2017–18 Botswana First Division North was the 41st season of the Botswana First Division North football league since its inception in 1978. It was played from August to May. BR Highlanders were crowned champions.

== League table ==
Pos	Team	Pld	W	D	L	GF	GA	GD	Pts
1	BR Highlanders (C)	22							42
2	Sua Flamingos (Q)	22							38
3	Motlakase Power Dynamos	22							37
4	Morupule Wanderers	22							35
5	Green Lovers	22							29
6	Calendar Stars	22							27
7	Nico United	22							26
8	Great North Tigers	22							25
9	Real Movers	22							21
10	Mahalapye United Hotspurs (Q) (R)	22							21
11	Francistown City Greens (Q)	22							20
12	Maphatshwa (R)	22							8

Champions, promoted to Botswana Premier League
Qualified for Botswana First Division playoffs
Relegated to Botswana Division One
