= 2018–19 Botswana Premier League =

Football league season

Botswana Premier League
- Season: 2018–19
- Champions: Township Rollers (16th title)
- Relegated: Sankoyo; Mochudi Centre Chiefs; Black Forest
- Champions League: Township Rollers
- Confederation Cup: Orapa United
- Matches: 240
- Goals: 588 (2.45 per match)
- Top goalscorer: Thero Setsile (18 goals)
- Biggest home win: Jwaneng Galaxy 5-0 Security Systems (25 August 2018)
- Biggest away win: BR Highlanders 0-6 Township Rollers (3 February 2019); Miscellaneous 0-6 Orapa United (23 April 2019)
- Highest scoring: Extension Gunners 3-3 Mochudi Centre Chiefs (18 August 2018); Black Forest 4-2 Sankoyo Bush Bucks (6 October 2018); BR Highlanders 0-6 Township Rollers (3 February 2019); Security Systems 3-3 BR Highlanders (17 February 2019); Township Rollers 4-2 Sharps Shooting Stars (3 March 2019); Miscellaneous 0-6 Orapa United (23 April 2019)
- Longest winning run: Township Rollers (6)
- Longest unbeaten run: Jwaneng Galaxy (15)
- Longest winless run: Sankoyo Bush Bucks; Black Forest (10)
- Longest losing run: Prisons XI (6)

The 2018–19 Botswana Premier League was the 42nd season of the Botswana Premier League, the top-tier football league in Botswana, since its establishment in 1978. The season started on 18 August 2018.

== Season summary ==
Township Rollers won their fourth consecutive Botswana Premier League after a 0–0 draw with Police XI on 27 May 2019.

This season also featured the relegation of four-time champions Mochudi Centre Chiefs, who only picked up five points from nine matches late in the season.

== Team changes ==
Two teams were relegated after one year in the Botswana Premier League, TAFIC F.C. and Uniao Flamengo Santos. They were joined by last place finishers Gilport Lions.

They were replaced by First Division North winners BR Highlanders, First Division South winners Notwane F.C., and promotion playoff winners Prisons XI.

== Teams ==
=== Stadiums and locations ===
Locations of teams in the 2018–19 Botswana Premier League

=== Number of teams by district ===
| Position | District | Number | Teams |
|---|---|---|---|
| 1 | South-East | 8 | Extension Gunners, Gaborone United, Notwane, Police XI, Prisons XI, Security Systems, Sharps Shooting Stars, Township Rollers |
| 2 | Central | 3 | BR Highlanders, Miscellaneous, Orapa United |
| 3 | Kweneng | 2 | Black Forest, BDF XI |
| 4 | Ngamiland | 1 | Sankoyo Bush Bucks |
| 4 | Kgatleng | 1 | Mochudi Centre Chiefs |
| 4 | South | 1 | Jwaneng Galaxy |

== League table ==
| Pos | Team | Pld | W | D | L | GF | GA | GD | Pts | Qualification or relegation |
|---|---|---|---|---|---|---|---|---|---|---|
| 1 | Township Rollers (C) | 30 | 20 | 8 | 2 | 61 | 15 | +46 | 68 | Qualification for Champions League |
| 2 | Jwaneng Galaxy (Q) | 30 | 19 | 9 | 2 | 58 | 17 | +41 | 66 | Qualification for Confederation Cup (Note: Jwaneng Galaxy are Mascom Top 8 Cup winners.) |
| 3 | Orapa United | 30 | 17 | 5 | 8 | 44 | 24 | +20 | 56 | |
| 4 | Police XI | 30 | 14 | 11 | 5 | 45 | 29 | +16 | 53 | |
| 5 | BDF XI | 30 | 12 | 10 | 8 | 35 | 31 | +4 | 46 | |
| 6 | Gaborone United | 30 | 12 | 10 | 8 | 42 | 31 | +11 | 46 | |
| 7 | Security Systems | 30 | 11 | 9 | 10 | 37 | 35 | +2 | 42 | |
| 8 | Sharps Shooting Stars | 30 | 9 | 10 | 11 | 36 | 36 | 0 | 37 | |
| 9 | Miscellaneous | 30 | 9 | 10 | 11 | 33 | 44 | −11 | 37 | |
| 10 | Extension Gunners | 30 | 9 | 9 | 12 | 35 | 41 | −6 | 36 | |
| 11 | BR Highlanders | 30 | 10 | 6 | 14 | 33 | 43 | −10 | 36 | |
| 12 | Notwane | 30 | 7 | 12 | 11 | 28 | 33 | −5 | 33 | |
| 13 | Prisons XI | 30 | 8 | 5 | 17 | 29 | 50 | −21 | 29 | |
| 14 | Sankoyo Bush Bucks (R) | 30 | 6 | 9 | 15 | 28 | 50 | −22 | 27 | Relegation |
| 15 | Mochudi Centre Chiefs (R) | 30 | 4 | 10 | 16 | 25 | 49 | −24 | 22 | Relegation |
| 16 | Black Forest (R) | 30 | 4 | 5 | 21 | 20 | 61 | −41 | 17 | Relegation |

Source: BPL
Rules for classification: 1) points; 2) goal difference; 3) number of goals scored.
(C) Champions; (Q) Qualified for the phase indicated; (R) Relegated
