= 2018–19 Botswana First Division North =

Botswana First Division North
- Season: 2018-19
- Champions: TAFIC
- Runner up: Morupule Wanderers
- Relegated: Palapye All-Stars; Real Movers

The 2018–19 Botswana First Division North was the 54th season of the Botswana First Division North football league since its inception in 1966. It was played from October to May instead of the usual August to May due to delays in the conclusion of a television broadcasting deal. TAFIC were crowned champions.

== Team summaries ==
Location of teams in the 2018-19 Botswana First Division North

Teams promoted to Botswana Premier League

- TAFIC

Teams promoted from Botswana Division One

Teams relegated to Botswana Division One

- Palapye All-Stars
- Real Movers

Stadiums and locations

Team	Location	Ground
TAFIC	Francistown	Francistown Stadium
Morupule Wanderers	Palapye	
Sua Flamingos	Sowa	
Eleven Angels	Francistown	
Motlakase Power Dynamos	Palapye	Palapye Stadium
Nico United	Selebi Phikwe	
Calendar Stars	Francistown	
Green Lovers	Serowe	
Great North Tigers	Francistown	
Francistown City Greens	Francistown	Francistown Stadium
Palapye All-Stars	Palapye	
Real Movers	Letlhakane	

== League table ==
Pos	Team	Pld	W	D	L	GF	GA	GD	Pts	Promotion or relegation
1	TAFIC (C, P)	22	18	3	1	49	15	+34	57	Champions, promoted to Botswana Premier League
2	Morupule Wanderers (Q)	22	16	2	4	37	19	+18	50	Qualified for Botswana First Division playoffs
3	Sua Flamingos	22	14	4	4	39	17	+22	46	
4	Eleven Angels	22	9	6	7	39	30	+9	33	
5	Motlakase Power Dynamos	22	8	6	8	28	32	−4	30	
6	Nico United	22	8	4	10	27	31	−4	28	
7	Calendar Stars	22	8	4	10	26	31	−5	28	
8	Green Lovers	22	7	2	13	26	35	−9	23	
9	Great North Tigers	22	6	5	11	31	44	−13	23	
10	Francistown City Greens	22	4	8	10	29	42	−13	20	
11	Palapye All-Stars (R)	22	4	4	14	17	38	−21	16	Relegated to Botswana Division One
12	Real Movers (R)	22	3	6	13	21	35	−14	15	Relegated to Botswana Division One

(C) Champions; (P) Promoted; (Q) Qualified for the phase indicated; (R) Relegated
