= Mogomotsi Mpote =

Motswana former footballer and manager

Personal information
- Full name: Mogomotsi Mpote
- Date of birth: 1 April 1962 (age 64)
- Place of birth: Serowe, Botswana
- Position: Striker

Senior career*
| Years | Team | Apps | (Gls) |
| 1976 | Miscellaneous | | |
- Diamond Chiefs
- TASC

Managerial career
- 1996–2005: TASC (assistant)
- 2005: TASC
- Miscellaneous
- 2012–2013: BR Highlanders
- 2013–2015: Township Rollers (assistant)
- 2015: Township Rollers (caretaker)
- 2015–2017: Township Rollers (assistant)
- 2017: Township Rollers
- 2017–2018: Township Rollers (assistant)
- 2018: Orapa United (assistant)
- 2018–2021: Orapa United
- 2019: Botswana (caretaker)
- 2022–2023: Botswana
- * Club domestic league appearances and goals

Mogomotsi Mpote is a Motswana former footballer and manager currently in charge of club Botswana.

== Career ==
Mpote played as a striker or classic number nine. Beginning his career as a teenager at Miscellaneous in 1976, he was nicknamed 'Teenage' because of his young age. Mpote would win the Botswana Second Division, then Botswana's second tier league with Miscellaneous before joining Orapa club Diamond Chiefs whom he helped win the Second Division as captain and player-coach in 1985. He later joined TASC, helping them win the 1990 Botswana FA Cup.

After retiring as a player Mpote joined TASC as an assistant manager in 1996 and worked under Dick Chama and Seth Moleofhi. Following Moleofhi's departure in 2005 Mpote was made the manager and immediately led the club to a fourth-place league finish. He would also lead Miscellaneous back to the Premier League and relegate BR Highlanders before joining Premier League giants Township Rollers as assistant manager. In 2017 after Mark Harrison left mid-season Mpote was appointed for the rest of the season and won the Botswana Premier League, becoming the first Motswana to do so since Joseph Panene in 2005. However, the following season he was demoted to assistant manager once again and left after clashing with Nikola Kavazovic. He joined fellow Premier League club Orapa United, initially as assistant manager but promoted to manager after Bongani Mafu's departure.

== Honours ==
=== Player ===
Miscellaneous

- Botswana Second Division: 1

1978

Diamond Chiefs

- Botswana Second Division: 1

1985

TASC

- Botswana FA Cup: 1

1990

=== Manager ===
Township Rollers

- Botswana Premier League: 1

2016-17

Orapa United

- Botswana FA Cup: 1

2018-19

- Mascom Top 8 Cup:1

2019-20

Individual

- Botswana Premier League Coach of the Season: 2017
- Botswana FA Cup Coach of the Tournament: 2019
- Mascom Top 8 Cup Coach of the Tournament: 2020
