= Khumoetsile Kufigwa =

Motswana footballer

Personal information
- Date of birth: 31 December 1990 (age 35)
- Place of birth: Serowe, Botswana
- Height: 1.80 m (5 ft 11 in)
- Position: Midfielder

Team information
- Current team: Morupule Wanderers

Senior career*
Years	Team	Apps	(Gls)
2013–2016	Nico United		
2016–2017	Orapa United		
2017–2018	Mochudi Centre Chiefs		
2018–2019	Sharps Shooting Stars		
2019–	Morupule Wanderers		

International career
2014	Botswana	1	(0)
- * Club domestic league appearances and goals

Khumoetsile Kufigwa (born 31 December 1990) is a Motswana footballer who plays as a midfielder for Morupule Wanderers.
