= Clever Hunda =

Zimbabwean football manager (born 1950)

Personal information
- Date of birth: 2 September 1950 (age 76)
- Place of birth: Harare, Zimbabwe
- Position: Midfielder

Senior career*
Years	Team	Apps	(Gls)
- Dynamos FC
- Black Aces FC

International career
	Zimbabwe	5	

Managerial career
- Botswana Police XI SC
- Gilport Lions FC
- Botswana Defence Force XI FC
- Prisons XI Gaborone
- Extension Gunners FC
- Uniao Flamengo Santos FC
- Notwane FC
- * Club domestic league appearances and goals

Clever Hunda is a Zimbabwean football manager who last managed Notwane FC.

== Life and career ==
Hunda was born on 2 September 1950 in Harare, Zimbabwe. He attended school in Harare, Zimbabwe. He grew up playing in Mai Musodzi Hall in Zimbabwe. He grew up in Mbare, Zimbabwe. He mainly operated as a midfielder. He was known for his strength and work ethic. As a youth player, he joined the youth academy of Zimbabwean side Dynamos FC. He played for the club's under-16 and under-18 teams. He started his senior career with them. He helped them win multiple cup competitions. After that, he signed for Zimbabwean side Black Aces FC. He was a Zimbabwe youth international. He played for the Zimbabwe national under-16 football team, Zimbabwe national under-18 football team, and Zimbabwe national under-21 football team. After that, he was a Zimbabwe international. He made five appearances for the Zimbabwe national football team.

Hunda moved to Botswana in 1986. He was appointed manager of Botswana side Botswana Police XI SC. After that, he was appointed manager of Botswana side Gilport Lions FC. After that, he was appointed manager of Botswana side Gilport Lions FC. After that, he was appointed manager of Botswana side Botswana Defence Force XI FC. After that, he was appointed manager of Botswana side Prisons XI Gaborone. After that, he was appointed manager of Botswana side Extension Gunners FC. After that, he was appointed manager of Botswana side Uniao Flamengo Santos FC. After that, he was appointed manager of Botswana side Notwane FC. He has been described as "proven that he has the ability to transform the players he once coached into good coaches... a strict disciplinarian". He has been regarded to have helped develop Botswana prospects.
