= 2022–23 Botswana First Division North =

Botswana First Division North
- Season: 2022–23
- Champions: TAFIC
- Relegated: Miscellaneous Rolling Guys

The 2022–23 was the 58th season of the Botswana First Division North, the second division of the football system in Botswana. TAFIC from Francistown became champion after finishing six points above second-placed Chadibe. Through becoming champion, TAFIC has ensured promotion to the Botswana Premier League. Chadibe ensured the right to play a play-off game against the number two of the Botswana First Division South for promotion. Chadibe lost the game 5–6 on penalties against VTM FC.

== League table ==
Pos	Team	Pld	GD	Pts	
1	TAFIC (C)	22	+19	46	Champions (promoted to the Botswana Premier League)
2	Chadibe	22	+19	40	Play-offs (lost to VTM FC)
3	Highlanders	22	+9	39	
4	Motlakase	22	+8	31	
5	Mbalakalungu	22	+5	31	
6	Santa Green	22	−1	31	
7	Calendar	22	−4	25	
8	Sankoyo Bush Bucks	22	−5	25	
9	Peacemakers	22	−6	24	
10	Green Lovers	22	−8	24	
11	Mischellaneous (R)	22	−13	23	Relegation
12	Rolling Guys (R)	22	−23	16	Relegation

Source: Botswana Football Association

Rules for classification: 1) points; 2) goal difference; 3) number of goals scored.

(C) Champion; (P) Promoted; (R) Relegated
