= 2017–18 Mascom Top 8 Cup =

Tournament details
- Country: Botswana
- Teams: 8

Final positions
- Champions: Township Rollers (2nd title)
- Runners-up: Orapa United

Tournament statistics
- Matches played: 13
- Goals scored: 39 (3 per match)
- Top goal scorer: Obonwe Maome (4 goals)

Awards
- Best player: Maano Ditshupo

The 2017–18 Mascom Top 8 Cup was the seventh edition of the Mascom Top 8 Cup. It was played from 24 November 2017 to 3 March 2018 by the top eight teams from the 2016-17 Botswana Premier League. It was won by Township Rollers.

== History ==
The 2017-18 Mascom Top 8 Cup was the only domestic tournament played in Botswana since the FA Cup was not contested. The winner qualified to represent Botswana in the 2018-19 CAF Confederation Cup, but this honour was given to the runners-up Orapa United since the champions Township Rollers had already qualified for the 2018-19 CAF Champions League. Security Systems were the only debutants in the tournament.

== Prize money ==
The prize money was increased by P100 000 but the rest was kept the same from the 2017 tournament.

- Champions: P1 300 000
- Runners up: P550 000
- Semifinalists: P300 000
- Quarterfinalists: P170 000

== Format ==
The quarterfinals and semifinals were played over two legs both home and away, with only one final in a predetermined venue. Three points were awarded for a win, one point for a draw and none for a loss. Aggregate score was used to determine the winner of a round. Where the aggregate score was equal away goals were used to pick out the victor and if those were equal the tied teams went into a penalty shootout. There was no quarterfinal draw. The teams were seeded based on their position in the table, with the first placed team facing off against the eighth placed team.

== Participants ==
Team	Location	League position
Township Rollers	Gaborone	1
Jwaneng Galaxy	Jwaneng	2
Orapa United	Orapa	3
Extension Gunners	Lobatse	4
Gaborone United	Gaborone	5
Security Systems	Otse	6
Mochudi Centre Chiefs	Mochudi	7
BDF XI	Mogoditshane	8

== Quarter-finals ==
First legs
Date	Home	Score	Away
November 24	Mochudi Centre Chiefs	2-1	Jwaneng Galaxy
November 25	BDF XI	0-2	Township Rollers
November 26	Security Systems	1-1	Orapa United
November 27	Gaborone United	3-0	Extension Gunners

Second legs
Date	Home	Score	Away
December 8	Orapa United	1-0	Security Systems
December 9	Extension Gunners	2-3	Gaborone United
December 10	Jwaneng Galaxy	3-1	Mochudi Centre Chiefs
December 11	Township Rollers	1-0	BDF XI

== Semi-finals ==
The draw for the semi-finals was conducted on 9 January 2018.

First legs
Date	Home	Score	Away
January 26	Orapa United	1-0	Gaborone United
January 28	Jwaneng Galaxy	2-2	Township Rollers

Second legs
Date	Home	Score	Away
February 2	Township Rollers	1-1	Jwaneng Galaxy
February 3	Gaborone United	1-4	Orapa United

== Final ==
Final
Date	Winners	Score	Runners up
March 3	Township Rollers	4-2	Orapa United

== Awards ==
- Top goalscorer | (Botswana) Obonwe Maome (4 goals) | Gaborone United
- Player of the tournament | (Botswana) Maano Ditshupo | Township Rollers
- Goalkeeper of the tournament | (Botswana) Keeagile Kgosipula | Township Rollers
- Coach of the tournament | (Serbia) Nikola Kavazovic | Township Rollers
- Referee of the tournament | (Botswana) Lekgotla Johannes
- Assistant referee of the tournament | (Botswana) Botsalo Mosimanewatlala
