= Omaatla Kebatho =

Motswana footballer

Personal information
- Date of birth: 16 June 1993 (age 33)
- Place of birth: Maun, Botswana
- Height: 1.80 m (5 ft 11 in)
- Position: Forward

Team information
- Current team: Jwaneng Galaxy

Senior career*
Years	Team	Apps	(Gls)
2012–2015	ECCO City Green		
2015–2016	Vasco da Gama	17	(2)
2016–2023	Orapa United		
2023–	Jwaneng Galaxy		

International career^{‡}
2015–	Botswana	26	(3)
- * Club domestic league appearances and goals ‡ National team caps and goals as of 19 November 2024

Omaatla Kebatho (born 16 June 1993) is a Motswana footballer.

== International career ==
=== International goals ===
Scores and results list Botswana's goal tally first.

No.	Date	Venue	Opponent	Score	Result	Competition
1.	28 May 2015	Moruleng Stadium, Moruleng, South Africa	Mozambique	1–1	1–2	2015 COSAFA Cup
2.	3 August 2019	National Heroes Stadium, Lusaka, Zambia	Zambia	1–0	2–3	2020 African Nations Championship qualification
3.	19 November 2024	30 June Stadium, Cairo, Egypt	Egypt	1–0	1–1	2025 Africa Cup of Nations qualification

== Honours ==
=== Club ===
Orapa United

- Botswana FA Cup: 1

2018-19

=== Individual ===
- Botswana FA Cup Top Goalscorer: 2019
