= Madinda Ndlovu =

Zimbabwean former footballer and manager (born 1965)

Personal information
- Full name: Madinda Ndlovu
- Date of birth: 2 May 1965 (age 61)

Managerial career
- Years: Team
- 1998-2005: Highlanders
- 2005-2007: Township Rollers
- 2007-2008: Nico United
- 2008-2009: Highlanders
- 2009-2010: Motlakase Power Dynamos
- 2010-2013: Mochudi Centre Chiefs
- 2013-2015: Township Rollers
- 2015-2017: Orapa United
- 2018-2019: Highlanders
- 2019: Gaborone United
- 2023-: Highlanders (Assistant coach)

Madinda Ndlovu (born 2 May 1965) is a Zimbabwean former footballer and manager currently in charge of Botswana Premier League club Gaborone United. He is generally considered one of the greatest Zimbabwean players of all time.

After retiring Ndlovu began his managerial career as head coach of his boyhood club Highlanders in 1998. He first came to Botswana as the manager of Township Rollers in 2005 but lasted only two seasons before joining fellow Botswana Premier League club Nico United, helping them to a highest-ever league finish.

== Honours ==
=== Manager ===
Highlanders, 2019 Mochudi Centre Chiefs

- Botswana Premier League:2

2011-12, 2012-13

Township Rollers

- Botswana Premier League:1

2013-14

Orapa United

- Mascom Top 8 Cup: 1

2015-16
