= Dragojlo Stanojlović =

Serbian football manager and player

Personal information
- Date of birth: 28 February 1956 (age 70)
- Place of birth: Koceljeva, PR Serbia, FPR Yugoslavia

Youth career
- Radnički Koceljeva

Senior career*
Years	Team	Apps	(Gls)
- Loznica

Managerial career
- 2004: Radnički Nova Pazova
- 2006: Radnički Sombor
- 2007: Radnički Sombor
- 2008: Sloven Ruma
- 2008: Solunac Rastina
- 2010: Sloga Petrovac
- 2011: Tekstilac Odžaci
- 2012: OFK Kikinda
- 2013: Sloga Petrovac
- 2013–2014: Mochudi Centre Chiefs
- 2014–2015: Extension Gunners
- 2015–2016: Gaborone United
- 2016–2017: Sankoyo Bush Bucks
- 2017–2018: Township Rollers (technical director)
- 2019: Notwane
- 2019–2020: Morupule Wanderers
- 2021: Rembas Resavica
- 2021–2022: Vision
- 2023–2024: OFK Osečina
- * Club domestic league appearances and goals

Dragojlo Stanojlović (Serbian Cyrillic: Драгојло Станојловић; born 28 February 1956) is a Serbian football manager and former player.

== Managerial career ==
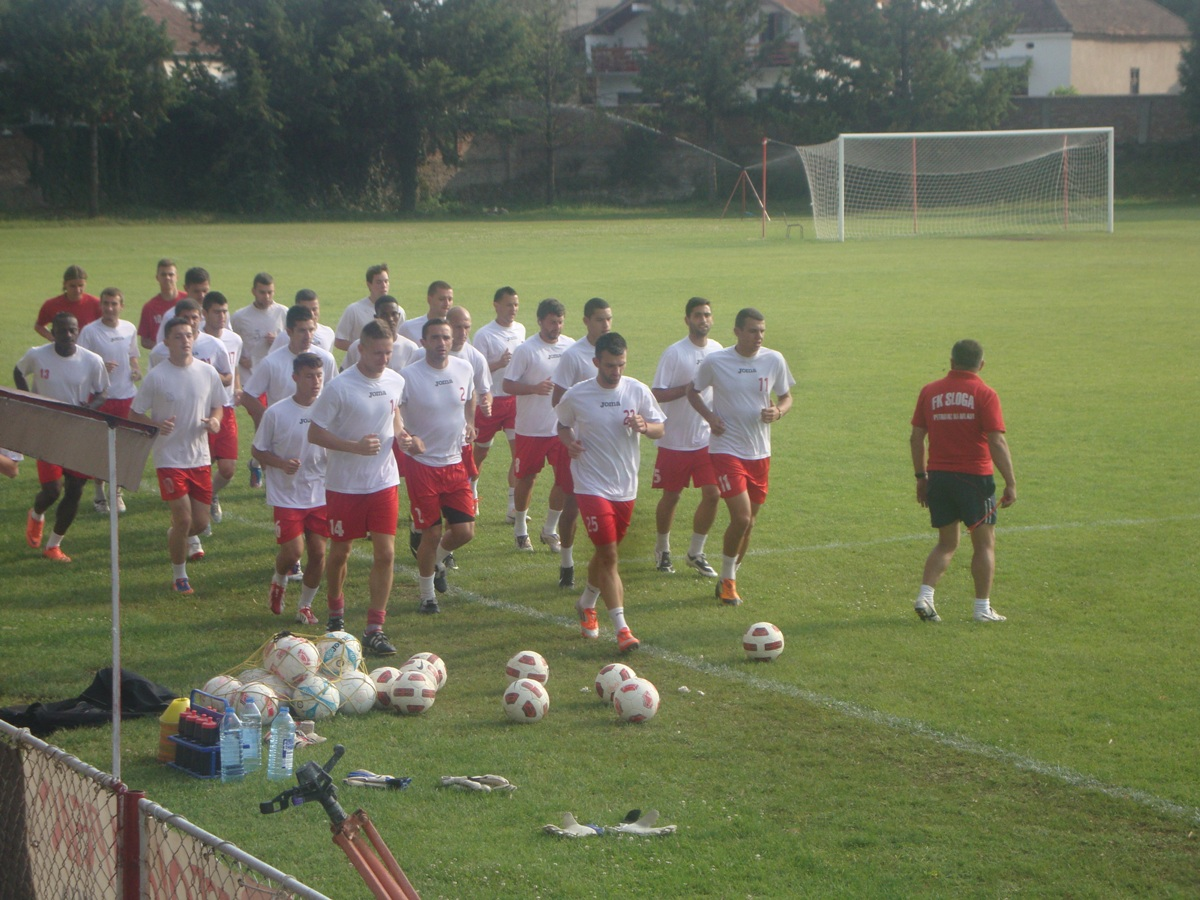
Stanojlović (first from right) during a training session with Sloga Petrovac in 2013

During the 2000s and 2010s, Stanojlović was manager of numerous lower league clubs in his homeland, including two spells at Radnički Sombor in the Serbian League Vojvodina. He was also manager of fellow Serbian League Vojvodina side Tekstilac Odžaci in 2011.

In August 2013, Stanojlović took charge of Botswana Premier League club Mochudi Centre Chiefs, but left them in February 2014. He subsequently served as manager of fellow Batswana sides Extension Gunners (March 2014–February 2015), Gaborone United (2015–January 2016), Sankoyo Bush Bucks (September 2016–2017), Notwane (July–August 2019), and Morupule Wanderers (2019–2020).
