= Khumo Motlhabane =

Motswana footballer

Personal information
- Full name: Khumo Motlhabane
- Date of birth: 17 February 1981 (age 45)
- Place of birth: Serowe, Botswana
- Height: 1.78 m (5 ft 10 in)
- Position: Left back

Team information
- Current team: Uniao Flamengo Santos FC

Senior career*
Years	Team	Apps	(Gls)
2000–2002	Jwaneng Comets FC		
2002-2004	BMC		
2004-2005	Extension Gunners FC		
2005-2010	Uniao Flamengo Santos FC		

International career^{‡}
2001–2008	Botswana	41	(1)
- * Club domestic league appearances and goals as of 29 August 2009 ‡ National team caps and goals as of 29 August 2009

Khumo Motlhabane (born 17 February 1981) is a Motswana footballer now retired, he used to play for Kanye Southern Pirates, Jwaneng Comets FC, Botswana Meat commission FC, Extension Gunners FC and Uniao Flamengo Santos FC in the Mascom Premier League.
