= Pako Lekgari =

Personal information
- Full name: Pako Alen Lekgari
- Date of birth: 27 December 1987 (age 38)
- Place of birth: Kanye, Botswana
- Height: 1.75 m (5 ft 9 in)
- Position: Left back

Team information
- Current team: Security Systems

Senior career*
Years	Team	Apps	(Gls)
2007–2009	Botswana Meat Commission		
2009–2010	Uniao Flamengo Santos		
2010–2011	Black Peril		
2011–2013	Black Africa		
2013–2014	Township Rollers		
2014–2015	Botswana Meat Commission		
2015–2016	Black Africa		
2016–2017	Jwaneng Galaxy		
2017–	Security Systems		

International career^{‡}
2013	Botswana	2	(0)
- * Club domestic league appearances and goals as of 09:16, 2 May 2018 (UTC) ‡ National team caps and goals as of 09:16, 2 May 2018 (UTC)

Pako Alen Lekgari (born 27 December 1987) is a Botswana international footballer who plays for Security Systems, as a left back.

== Career ==
Born in Kanye, Lekgari has played club football for Botswana Meat Commission, Uniao Flamengo Santos, Black Peril, Black Africa, Township Rollers, Jwaneng Galaxy and Security Systems.

He made his international debut for Botswana in 2013.
