= Allen Ndodole =

Motswana footballer

Personal information
- Full name: Allen Amantle Ndodole
- Date of birth: 4 February 1996 (age 30)
- Place of birth: Palapye, Botswana
- Position: Midfielder

Team information
- Current team: Orapa United

Senior career*
Years	Team	Apps	(Gls)
- FC Palapye
2014–2016	Nico United		
2016–2017	Mochudi Centre Chiefs		
2017–2019	Sharps Shooting Stars		
2019–	Orapa United		

International career
2019	Botswana	1	(0)
- * Club domestic league appearances and goals

Allen Ndodole (born 4 February 1996) is a Motswana footballer who plays as a midfielder for Orapa United.
