= Chenjerai Dube =

Zimbabwean footballer (born 1976)

Personal information
- Date of birth: 18 December 1976 (age 49)
- Position: Goalkeeper

Senior career*
Years	Team	Apps	(Gls)
1995–2000	Wankie F.C.		
2001	Highlanders F.C.		
2002	Wankie F.C.		
- Highlanders F.C.
–2008	Railstars F.C.		
2008–2009	BMC Lobatse		
2010–2013	Uniao Flamengo Santos F.C.		
2013	Hwange F.C.		

International career
2001	Zimbabwe	3	(0)
- * Club domestic league appearances and goals

Chenjerai Dube (born 18 December 1976) is a retired Zimbabwean football goalkeeper. A Zimbabwe international, he played at the 2001 COSAFA Cup.
