= Kagiso Gofaone Molapi =

Motswana footballer

Personal information
- Date of birth: 7 July 1990 (age 36)
- Place of birth: Mochudi, Botswana
- Height: 1.79 m (5 ft 10 in)
- Position: Defender

Team information
- Current team: Jwaneng Galaxy

Senior career*
Years	Team	Apps	(Gls)
2009–2010	Police XI		
2010–2015	Miscellaneous		
2015–	Jwaneng Galaxy		

International career^{‡}
2011	Botswana	1	(0)
- * Club domestic league appearances and goals as of 3 October 2021 ‡ National team caps and goals as of 3 October 2021

Kagiso Gofaone Molapi (born 7 July 1990) is a Motswana footballer who plays as a defender for Jwaneng Galaxy.
