= Orange Kabelano Charity Cup =

The Orange Kabelano Charity Cup is a football (soccer) one match competition in Botswana. It was created in 1996 and the participation in this one-day event is decided by invitation or by a public vote.

== Winners/Finalists ==
- 1996 : Extension Gunners (Lobatse)
- 1997 : Mochudi Centre Chiefs
- 1998 : Extension Gunners (Lobatse)
- 1999-00 : Not played
- 2001 : Extension Gunners (Lobatse)
- 2002 : Township Rollers (Gaborone) 1-0 Notwane (Gaborone)
- 2003 : Gaborone United
- 2004 : Township Rollers (Gaborone) 1-0 Extension Gunners (Lobatse)
- 2005 : Mochudi Centre Chiefs 2-0 Extension Gunners (Lobatse)
- 2006 : Township Rollers (Gaborone) 4-2 Notwane (Gaborone)
- 2007 : Notwane (Gaborone) 3-1 Mochudi Centre Chiefs (aet)
- 2008 : Mochudi Centre Chiefs (Mochudi) 2-0 ECCO City Greens
- 2014 : Township Rollers (Gaborone) 1(6)-(5)1 Mochudi Centre Chiefs No Extra time
