= Onkarabile Ratanang =

Motswana footballer

Personal information
- Full name: Onkarabile Ratanang
- Date of birth: 16 March 1998 (age 28)
- Place of birth: Botswana
- Position: Left-back

Team information
- Current team: Township Rollers
- Number: 6

Senior career*
Years	Team	Apps	(Gls)
2016–2019	Sankoyo Bush Bucks		
2019–	Township Rollers		

International career^{‡}
2019–	Botswana	4	(0)
- * Club domestic league appearances and goals ‡ National team caps and goals as of 18 November 2019

Onkarabile Ratanang (born 16 March 1998) is a Motswana professional footballer who plays as a left-back for Botswana Premier League club Township Rollers and the Botswana national team.

== International career ==
Ratanang was given his senior debut by Adel Amrouche on an Independence Day friendly against Liberia.

== Honours ==
=== Club ===
Township Rollers

- Botswana Premier League (1): 2018-19
