= Kutlwelo Mpolokang =

Motswana footballer

Personal information
- Full name: Kutlwelo William Mpolokang
- Date of birth: 9 February 1996 (age 30)
- Place of birth: Botswana, Palapye
- Position: Midfielder

Team information
- Current team: Township Rollers

Senior career*
Years	Team	Apps	(Gls)
2014–2016	Sankoyo Bush Bucks		
2016	Extension Gunners		
2017–2018	Gaborone United		
2018–2020	Jwaneng Galaxy		
2021–	Township Rollers		

International career^{‡}
2021–	Botswana	5	(0)
- * Club domestic league appearances and goals as of 3 October 2021 ‡ National team caps and goals as of 3 October 2021

Kutlwelo Mpolokang (born 9 February 1996) is a Motswana footballer who currently plays for Township Rollers.
