= Duncan Kgopolelo =

Motswana footballer

Personal information
- Full name: Duncan Kgopolelo
- Date of birth: 24 September 1974 (age 52)
- Place of birth: Botswana
- Position: Striker

Senior career*
Years	Team	Apps	(Gls)
2002–2003	Wonder Sporting		
2003–	Police XI		

International career
2003–2006	Botswana	12	(0)
- * Club domestic league appearances and goals

Duncan Kgopolelo (born 24 September 1974) is a Motswana footballer who currently plays as a striker for Police XI. He played for the Botswana national football team between 2003 and 2006.
