= Barulaganye Bolofete =

Motswana footballer

Personal information
- Full name: Barulaganye Bolofete
- Date of birth: 12 December 1979 (age 46)
- Place of birth: Botswana
- Position: Midfielder

Senior career*
Years	Team	Apps	(Gls)
1999–2004	Extension Gunners		
2004–	TASC FC		

International career
2001–2002	Botswana	2	(0)
- * Club domestic league appearances and goals

Barulaganye Bolofete (born 12 December 1979) is a Motswana former footballer. He played two matches for the Botswana national team between 2001 and 2002.
