= Thatayaone Kgamanyane =

Motswana footballer

Personal information
- Full name: Thatayaone Witness Kgamanyane
- Date of birth: 30 January 1996 (age 30)
- Place of birth: Ramotswa, Botswana
- Height: 1.81 m (5 ft 11 in)
- Position: Midfielder

Team information
- Current team: Gaborone United
- Number: 10

Senior career*
Years	Team	Apps	(Gls)
2014–2015	Killer Giants		
2015–2016	Green Lovers		
2016–2017	Black Forest		
2017–2018	Gaborone United		
2018	Chippa United	2	(1)
2019–	Gaborone United		

International career^{‡}
2017–	Botswana	35	(7)
- * Club domestic league appearances and goals ‡ National team caps and goals as of 28 September 2026

Thatayaone Kgamanyane (born 30 January 1996) is a Motswana footballer who plays for Botswana Premier League clubs Gaborone United and the Botswana national football team.

== Career statistics ==
=== International ===
As of match played 28 September 2026

Appearances and goals by national team and year
National team	Year	Apps	Goals
Botswana	2017	1	0
Botswana	2018	7	1
Botswana	2019	1	0
Botswana	2020	1	0
Botswana	2021	6	3
Botswana	2022	3	0
Botswana	2023	7	1
Botswana	2024	2	0
Botswana	2025	5	1
Botswana	2026	2	1
Total		35	7

=== International goals ===
Scores and results list Botswana's goal tally first.

No.	Date	Venue	Opponent	Score	Result	Competition
1	1 June 2018	Peter Mokaba Stadium, Polokwane, South Africa	Mauritius	3–0	6–0	2018 COSAFA Cup
2	10 July 2021	Wolfson Stadium, Ibhayi, South Africa	Lesotho	4–0	4–0	2021 COSAFA Cup
3	13 July 2021	Wolfson Stadium, Ibhayi, South Africa	Zambia	1–1	1–2	2021 COSAFA Cup
4	14 July 2021	Wolfson Stadium, Ibhayi, South Africa	Eswatini	1–1	1–1	2021 COSAFA Cup
5	8 July 2023	King Zwelithini Stadium, Umlazi, South Africa	South Africa	1–0	1–2	2023 COSAFA Cup
6	11 June 2025	Dr. Petrus Molemela Stadium, Bloemfontein, South Africa	Zambia	1–0	3–3	2025 COSAFA Cup
7	28 September 2026	Hammadi Agrebi Stadium, Tunis, Tunisia	Tunisia	1–0	2–2	2027 Africa Cup of Nations qualification

== Honours ==
=== Club ===
Gaborone United

- FA Cup:1

2020

=== Individual ===
- Botswana Premier League Golden Boot: 2018
- Orange FA Cup Player of the Tournament: 2020
