= Kweneng Regional Football Association Division One League =

Kweneng Regional Football Association Division One
- Organising body: Kweneng Regional Football Association
- Founded: 1966
- Country: Botswana
- Region: Kweneng
- Number of clubs: 14
- Level on pyramid: 3
- Promotion to: Botswana First Division North
- Relegation to: KRFA Division Two
- Domestic cup: FA Cup
- Current champions: Masitaoka (2018–19)
- Current: 2018-19 Kweneng Division One

The Kweneng Regional Football Association Division One League, also known as the KRFA Division One, is one of the regional leagues that make up the third tier of Botswana football. It is administered by the Kweneng Regional Football Association and features teams from Kweneng District.

== Clubs ==
List of clubs in the 2019–20 KRFA:

- Majweng
- Kumakwane United (Kumakwane)
- Moritshane Lions
- VTM Security
- Mmopane (Mmopane)
- Walker XI
- Lesirane City (Lesirane)
- Metsimotlhabe (Metsimotlhabe)
- Molmas
- Sanyane Celtics
- Cubs
- Sweet XI
- Thamaga (Thamaga)
- Molepolole Tigers (Molepolole)
- African Birds
- Dintoronkong

== Past seasons ==
Season	Winners	Runners-up	Relegated at end of season	Promoted at end of season
2013–14	Lesirane City			
2014–15	Sweet XI		Metsimotlhabe, Mmakgosi	
2018–19	Masitaoka			
