= Louis Setshwane =

Motswana footballer

Personal information
- Full name: Louis Setshwane
- Place of birth: Botswana
- Position: Midfielder

Senior career*
Years	Team	Apps	(Gls)
1998–1999	Botswana Defence Force XI		

International career
1999	Botswana	1	(0)
- * Club domestic league appearances and goals

Louis Setshwane is a Motswana former professional footballer who played primarily as a midfielder. He won one cap for the Botswana national team in 1999.

== See also ==
- Football in Botswana
