= Innocent Ranku =

Motswana footballer

Personal information
- Full name: Innocent Ranku
- Place of birth: Botswana
- Position: Midfielder

Senior career*
Years	Team	Apps	(Gls)
1997–2002	Notwane FC		
2002–2003	UF Santos		
2003–2004	Mochudi Centre Chiefs		
2004–	UF Santos		

International career
1997–2003	Botswana	9	(1)
- * Club domestic league appearances and goals

Innocent Ranku is a Motswana footballer who currently plays as a midfielder for Uniao Flamengo Santos. He played for the Botswana national football team between 1997 and 2003.
