= Mascom Top 8 Cup =

- Founded: 2012
- Teams: 8
- Current champions: Orapa United (2019–20)
- Most championships: Gaborone United; Township Rollers; Jwaneng Galaxy; Orapa United(2 titles)

The Mascom Top 8 Cup is a football cup competition in Botswana. It was created in 2012, and features the top eight finishers from the Botswana Premier League.

Since 2013, the winners qualify for the CAF Confederation Cup, as the FA Challenge Cup is not played. This was stopped in 2019 with the return of the FA Cup.

== Format ==
The Mascom Top 8 Cup is played by the top eight finishers from the previous season of the Premier League. The quarter-finals and semi-finals are played as two-legged ties both home and away, with a once-off final. In the case where the scores are tied after the two-legged ties, the Away goals rule will apply to decide the winner. However, this rule only applies in the first 90 minutes. If the aggregate score and the away goals scored are level after the 90 minutes of the 2nd leg, the teams will proceed to extra time and the Away goals rule will be disregarded thereafter. This means that if the aggregate score is still tied after extra time, the match will proceed to a penalty shoot-out regardless of the away goals scored in that 30 minutes.

This slight deviation from the standard Away goals rule led to controversy in the semi-final of the 2018–19 Mascom Top 8 Gaborone Derby clash between bitter rivals Township Rollers and Gaborone United. Rollers had won the 1st leg 2–0 away. In the 2nd leg, United also won 2–0 away, meaning the match would then proceed to extra time with the 2-2 aggregate score and Away goals rule would not apply then. In extra time, Rollers pulled one back before a late United penalty restored their 2-goal advantage to finish the match at 3-1 (aggregate 3-3). At the end of extra time, Rollers fans and players prematurely celebrated as they thought they were through to the final on away goals. After a delay and reference to the rules of the competition, the penalty shoot-out was eventually played to a mostly empty National Stadium as most of the fans had left, oblivious to what was transpiring on the field of play.

Gaborone United won the shoot-out 10-9 and proceeded to the final where they'd suffer a 0–2 defeat to Jwaneng Galaxy.

== Past finals ==
- 2011/12: Township Rollers 3-1 ECCO City Greens
- 2012/13: Gaborone United 2-1 Botswana Defence Force
- 2013/14: Botswana Defence Force XI 1-1 (aet; 5-4 pen.) Township Rollers
- 2014/15: Gaborone United 2-1 Township Rollers
- 2015/16: Orapa United 3-1 (aet) Township Rollers
- 2016/17: Jwaneng Galaxy 4-3 (aet) Orapa United
- 2017/18: Township Rollers 4-2 Orapa United
- 2018/19: Gaborone United 0-2 Jwaneng Galaxy
- 2019/20:Orapa United 1-1 (aet; 4-3 pen.) Township Rollers
- 2020/21: Cancelled
- 2021/22: Cancelled

== Results by team ==
Results by team
Club	Wins	First final won	Last final won	Runners up	Last final lost	Total final appearances
Township Rollers	2	2012	2018	4	2020	6
Gaborone United	2	2013	2015	1	2019	3
Jwaneng Galaxy	2	2017	2019	–	–	2
Orapa United	2	2016	2020	2	2018	4
BDF XI	1	2014	2014	1	2013	2
Francistown City Greens	–	–	–	1	2012	1

== Manager records ==
Season	Winner	Manager
2011–12	Township Rollers	(Zambia) Mike Sithole
2012–13	Gaborone United	(Botswana) David Bright
2013–14	BDF XI	(Zambia) Elijah Chikwanda
2014–15	Gaborone United	(Zimbabwe) Rahman Gumbo
2015–16	Orapa United	(Zimbabwe) Madinda Ndlovu
2016–17	Jwaneng Galaxy	(Zambia) Mike Sithole
2017–18	Township Rollers	(Serbia) Nikola Kavazovic
2018–19	Jwaneng Galaxy	(Portugal) Miguel da Costa
2019–20	Orapa United	(Botswana) Mogomotsi Mpote
