= Wonder Sporting Club =

Wonder Sporting
- Full name: Wonder Sporting
- Nickname: Matjimenyenga
- Founded: 1959
- Dissolved: 28 January 2014
- Ground: Otse Stadium; Otse, Botswana
- Capacity: 2,000
- League: Botswana Premier League
- 2017–18: 13th
Home colours

Wonder Sporting is a former football club from Botswana based in Otse.

== History ==
The club played last in Botswana Premier League. The Club merged on 28 January 2014 with Botswana Police XI SC to Police XI FC.

== Stadium ==
The team plays at the 2,000 capacity Otse Stadium.

== League participations ==
- Botswana Premier League: 2013
- Botswana First Division South: ????–2013

== Notable past players ==
- (Botswana) Duncan Kgopolelo
