= Botswana FA Challenge Cup =

- Founded: 1968; 58 years ago
- Region: Botswana
- Teams: 48
- Qualifier for: CAF Confederation Cup
- Current champions: Jwaneng Galaxy (2025) (2nd title)
- Most championships: Gaborone United (9 titles)
- 2025 Botswana FA Cup

The FA Challenge Cup, currently known as the Orange FA Cup or Orange Cup for sponsorship reasons, is the premier club football tournament in Botswana. Started in 1968 and first played as the Lions Cup, the tournament is based on the idea of giving lower league and amateur teams a chance to compete with top flight teams. It is based on the English FA Cup, which has become known for "giant killings" (lower league teams defeating top flight.

== History ==
The tournament was started in 1968 as the Lions Cup. This name stayed in place until 1992 when the tournament was sponsored by Coca-Cola and was known as the Coca-Cola Cup. The tournament was known as the Coca-Cola Cup until the sponsorship deal expired in 2012. However, it was not played for six years due to lack of sponsors. In 2018 it was sponsored by Orange and was renamed the Orange FA Cup or Orange Cup.

== Sponsorship ==
The tournament was first sponsored in 1992. Below is a list of all the sponsors to date:

- 1992–2012: Coca-Cola (Coca-Cola Cup)
- 2013–2018: No sponsor
- 2019: Orange (Orange FA Cup)

== Format ==
Initially the tournament was played by a total of 64 teams. The tournament began with the qualifying rounds featuring Botswana Division One teams. Only 32 Division One teams progressed and faced off in the extra preliminary round, with the winners playing against the top 16 Botswana First Division teams in the preliminary round. Botswana Premier League teams entered directly in the first round (the round of 32) to face the winners of the preliminary round. On 3 December 2018 it was announced that the tournament would now be played by 48 teams. The premier league sides automatically qualify for the round of 32 whereas the top eight finishers from either First Division league face off with 16 Division One teams from regional playoffs. From the round of 32 onwards teams are not seeded. Games which end in a draw after 90 minutes plus added time are subject to extra time and penalties if necessary. The winner walks away with P700 000 ($70 000) and also qualifies to play in the CAF Confederation Cup, the African equivalent of the UEFA Europa League.

== Past finals ==
- 1968: Gaborone United
- 1969: Not known
- 1970: Gaborone United
- 1971–1977: Not known
- 1978: Notwane
- 1979: Township Rollers
- 1980–1982: Not known
- 1983: Police 3–2 Mochudi Centre Chiefs
- 1984: Gaborone United
- 1985: Gaborone United
- 1986: Nico United (Selibe-Pikwe) bt Gaborone United
- 1987: Nico United
- 1988: Extension Gunners
- 1989: Botswana Defence Force XI
- 1990: Gaborone United
- 1991: TASC 3–2 Botswana Defence Force XI
- 1991*: Mochudi Centre Chiefs (Mochudi) (3) bt (2) LCS Gunners
- 1992: Extension Gunners 2–1 TAFIC
- 1993: Township Rollers 4–1 Gaborone United
- 1994: Township Rollers 2–0 Extension Gunners
- 1995: Notwane PG 2–0 Mokgosi Young Fighters
- 1996: Township Rollers 2–0 Botswana Meat Commission FC
- 1997: Notwane PG 2–0 Mokgosi Young Fighters
- 1998: Botswana Defence Force XI 1–0 Jwaneng Comets
- 1999: Mogoditshane Fighters 3–0 FC Satmos
- 2000: Mogoditshane Fighters 1–1 Gaborone United (aet, 5–4 pens)
- 2001: TASC 2–0 Extension Gunners
- 2002: TAFIC 0–0 TASC(aet, 6-5 pens)
- 2003: Mogoditshane Fighters 1–0 Township Rollers
- 2004: Botswana Defence Force XI 2–1 Mogoditshane Fighters
- 2005: Township Rollers 3–1 Botswana Defence Force XI (aet)
- 2006: Notwane 2–1 Botswana Defence Force XI
- 2007: Botswana Meat Commission FC 1–1 ECCO City Greens (aet, 6–5 pens)
- 2008: Mochudi Centre Chiefs 5–2 Uniao Flamengo Santos
- 2009: Uniao Flamengo Santos (Gabane) 1–1 Botswana Defence Force XI (aet, 4–2 pens)
- 2010: Township Rollers 3–1 Mochudi Centre Chiefs
- 2011: Extension Gunners 3–1 Motlakase Power Dynamos
- 2012: Gaborone United 0–0 Mochudi Centre Chiefs (aet, 4–2 pens)
- 2013–2018: Not played
- 2019: Orapa United 3–0 Township Rollers
- 2020: Gaborone United 3–0 Masitaoka (Molepolole)
- 2021: Not held
- 2022: Gaborone United 2-1 Security Systems
- 2023: Gaborone United 1-0 Orapa United
- 2024: Jwaneng Galaxy 2–1 Orapa United
- 2025: Jwaneng Galaxy 2–0 Security Systems

- NB* : 2 Lions Cup finals are reported for 1991, possibly one was for a 1990/91 season, the other for a (transitional) 1991 season

=== Results by team ===
Titles	Club
9	Gaborone United
6	Township Rollers
4	Notwane
3	Botswana Defence Force XI; Mogoditshane Fighters; Extension Gunners
2	TASC; Mochudi Centre Chiefs; Jwaneng Galaxy
1	Uniao Flamengo Santos; TAFIC; Police; Botswana Meat Commission FC; Orapa United

== Manager records ==
Season	Winner	Manager
1999	Mogoditshane Fighters	(Botswana) David Bright
2000	Mogoditshane Fighters	(Botswana) David Bright
2002	TAFIC	(Botswana) Ntime Ntime
2005	Township Rollers	(Botswana) Joseph Panene
2010	Township Rollers	(Zimbabwe) Rahman Gumbo
2011	Extension Gunners	(Zimbabwe) Maxwell Moyo
2012	Gaborone United	(Botswana) Philemon Makhwengwe
2019	Orapa United	(Botswana) Mogomotsi Mpote
2020	Gaborone United	(Botswana) Innocent Morapedi
2022	Gaborone United	(Botswana) Innocent Morapedi
2023	Gaborone United	(Botswana) Pontsho Moloi
2024	Jwaneng Galaxy	(South Africa) Morena Ramoreboli
2025	Jwaneng Galaxy	(Northern Ireland) Sean Connor
