= Eleven Angels FC =

- Full name: Eleven Angels Football Club
- Nickname: Lekgamu la Bananyana (Youthful Side)
- Founded: 2010
- Ground: Old Francistown Stadium; Francistown, Botswana
- Capacity: 4,000
- Manager: Seemo Mpatane
- League: First Division North
- 2025–2026: 8th, First Division North

Eleven Angels FC is a Botswanan football club based in Francistown that currently competes in the Botswana Premier League.

== History ==
The club was founded in 2010 by Seemo Mpatane. He officially registered the club with the Botswana Football Association in 2013 in an effort to protect players and create revenue. That year Eleven Angels began play in the third division. For the 2017/18 season, the team won the Botswana Division One and qualified for the Botswana First Division North promotion playoffs. The team qualified for the Botswana Premier League for the first time following a successful promotion play-off against Mochudi Centre Chiefs SC in 2022.
