= Botswana First Division North =

Debswana First Division North
- Organising body: Botswana Football Association
- Founded: 1966
- Country: (Botswana)
- Confederation: CAF
- Number of clubs: 12
- Level on pyramid: 2
- Promotion to: Botswana Premier League
- Relegation to: Botswana Division One
- Domestic cup: FA Challenge Cup
- International cup: CAF Confederation Cup
- Current champions: TAFIC (2022-23)
- Broadcaster(s): Maru TV, NOW TV
- Current: 2024-25 Botswana First Division North

The Botswana First Division North (currently known as the Debswana First Division North due to sponsorship reasons) is the second-tier professional football league in Botswana. Founded in 1966 after Botswana was granted independence, it is administered by the Botswana Football Association and features teams from the northern part of the country. Inaugural participants in the league included Eleven Angels from Francistown.

== History ==
The league was founded in 1966 as an attempt by the BFA to stimulate grassroots football development and evenly spread the sport across the country. Although First Division teams are directly promoted to the top tier of Botswana football and also participate in the FA Challenge Cup, the winner of which qualifies to compete in the CAF Confederation Cup, an African continental competition equivalent to the UEFA Europa League, critics have claimed the league is not taken seriously enough. Cited as an example is the fact that the First Division North did not get a sponsor until 2013, 45 years into its existence, and lacks proper stadia unlike other second-tier leagues like South Africa's National First Division.

In 2014 the league was rocked by a clash between BFA and the government over the issue of constituency tournaments. Constituency tournaments were introduced by the government in 2008 to combat social ills through sport. The BFA appealed to the government to terminate the tournaments as many First Division players were deserting their clubs to take part in the tournaments for a quick and slightly higher payout, violating BFA regulations. BFA also had a problem with the tournament being under government control and not their own as the Botswana football governing body. However, the government refused as constituency tournaments were seen as amateur competitions and not professional, and BFA appealed to FIFA to resolve the issue.

After sending a delegation to Botswana on a fact-finding mission FIFA ruled that the administration of constituency tournaments be handed over to the BFA and threatened to ban Botswana if this was not done. Following months of discussions the constituency tournament format and rules were amended to meet FIFA standards and it was agreed that BFA would have a say in its running.

== Sponsorship ==
Since its inception in 1966 the First Division North has had only one sponsor. The sponsor has been able to determine the league's sponsorship name. Below is a list of all the sponsors to date:

- 2013–present: Debswana (Debswana First Division North)

== TV rights ==
On 27 June 2018 BFA signed a deal with Baboneng Film Productions to broadcast live First Division games, making Baboneng the first ever private company to broadcast First Division games. The groundbreaking deal was for P9 000 000 over five years commencing from the 2018–19 season and concluding in 2022–23. Baboneng agreed to pay P1 500 000 per season for the first two seasons and P2 000 000 per season afterwards. Any games that are not covered by Baboneng's MARU TV are to be broadcast by the state-owned youth channel NOW TV.

== Format ==
There are 12 teams in the First Division North. Matches are played in a double round robin format, meaning every team plays every other team twice in a season both home and away. Three points are awarded for a win, one for a draw and none for a loss. At the end of the season the team with most points is crowned champions and gains automatic promotion to the Botswana Premier League whereas the runners up go into the First Division promotional playoffs with the runners up of the First Division South. The team with the lowest points is relegated to the Division One league of their respective regional FA but the number of teams relegated depends on the number of northern teams relegated from the premier league. If only one northern team is relegated from the premier league then three teams are relegated from the First Division North to make space for both the relegated team and the two promoted from Division One.

Where there is a tie of points goal difference is used to separate teams and determine log standings. First Division North games are generally played on weekend afternoons. Since the northern parts of Botswana generally lack proper stadium facilities as compared to the south and there are therefore next to no stadiums set aside for lower league use, First Division matches are played on dusty school grounds and other community spaces, resulting in the First Division being nicknamed 'ko leroleng' or 'at the dust'.

== FA Challenge Cup ==
The top eight teams in the First Division North automatically qualify to play in the FA Challenge Cup. Although no First Division North team has ever won the competition, they see it as an opportunity to market their players and attract attention through 'giant-killing' victories over premier league teams.

== Clubs ==
List of teams in the 2022-23 First Division North:

Club	City/Town
Calendar	Francistown
Chadibe	Chadibe
Green Lovers	Serowe
Highlanders	Mahalapye
Mbalakalungu	Kasane
Miscellaneous	Serowe
Motlakase	Palapye
Peacemakers	Bobonong
Rolling Guys	Mahalapye
Sankoyo	Maun
Santa Green	Mahalapye
TAFIC	Francistown

== Past seasons ==
Season	Winner	Runner-up	Relegated at end of season	Promoted at end of season!
1999-00	TASC	Nico United	Diamond Chieffs; Phodisong Rovers	Mahalapye Prisons; Maun Tigers; Rhinos
2005-06	TAFIC	Stonebreakers	Orapa Wanderers; Chobe United	Ferry Wanderers; Red Lions
2007-08		Miscellaneous		
2011-12	Motlakase Power Dynamos			
2013-14	Sankoyo Bush Bucks			
2014-15	Miscellaneous			
2015-16	Green Lovers			
2016-17	TAFIC	Francistown City Greens		
2017-18	BR Highlanders	Sua Flamingos	Mahalapye United Hotspurs; Maphatshwa	Eleven Angels; Palapye All-Stars
2018-19	TAFIC	Morupule Wanderers	Palapye All-Stars; Real Movers	Santa Green; Maun United Terrors
2019-20	Sua Flamingos	Nico United		
2020-21	Cancelled due to COVID-19			
2021-22				
2022-23	TAFIC	Chadibe	Miscellaneous; Rolling Guys	
2023-24				
2024-25	Police XI			

== Manager records ==
Season	Winner	Manager
2016-17	TAFIC	(Zimbabwe) Elias Chinyemba
2017-18	BR Highlanders	(Botswana) Kabo Dintwa
2018-19	TAFIC	(Zimbabwe) Elias Chinyemba
