= Morupule Wanderers FC =

Association football club in Botswana

Morupule Wanderers Football Club
- Full name: Morupule Wanderers Football Club
- Nicknames: Bafana ba Magala, Wandi-Wandi
- Founded: 1977
- Ground: Palapye Stadium
- League: Botswana Premier League
- 2025–26: 5th

Morupule Wanderers Football Club is a football club based in Palapye. It was formed in 1977 by Morupule Colliery employees. Morupule Wanderers FC is affectionately known to its followers as Wandi-Wandi. Its slogan is Bafana Ba Magala, which directly translates to Coal Boys.

At formation, Morupule Wanderers FC competed socially around the village. It later joined the third division of the Botswana Football Association (BFA), a regional football league. It spent nearly three decades in the lower echelons of football, until in 2015 when MCM sponsored the club.

Morupule Wanderers rose through the ranks of mainstream football from second division, first division and at the end of the 2018–19 season, the club was promoted to the Botswana Premier League by beating First Division South runners up Jwaneng Fighters in the Botswana Premier League playoffs, ending a 46-year First Division North stay.
