= Great North Tigers F.C. =

Great North Tigers
- Full name: Great North Tigers Football Club
- Ground: Francistown Stadium; Francistown, Botswana
- Capacity: 26,000
- Manager: Edward Leposo
- League: Botswana Premier League
- 2012–13: 7th

Great North Tigers is a Botswana football club that participates in the country's Botswana First Division North and is affiliate of Botswana Football Association. The club won promotion to the Botswana Premier League in June 2008.

== Club officials ==
Sports

- Coach: Seth Thazah Moleofi
- Assistant coach: Edward Leposo
- Assistant coach: Bakanoki Maseko
