= Sharps Shooting Stars FC =

Football club in Botswana

- Founded: 1984
- Ground: University of Botswana Stadium, Gaborone
- Manager: Razor Tsatsilebe
- League: Botswana Premier League
- 2017-18: 7th

Sharps Shooting Stars FC are a football club from Gaborone, Botswana, currently playing in the Botswana Premier League. Their club colour is gold.

== History ==
The club were formed in 1984.

Led by Keitsumetse Pio Paul, Sharps won the 2016-17 First Division South, and gained promotion to the Botswana Premier League for the first time. They finished mid-table in their first season in the league.

Sharps exceeded expectations at the start of the 2018-19 campaign, winning their first three matches and sitting third on the ladder after the first 11 games.
