= F.C. Satmos =

Satmos
- Full name: FC Satmos
- Nickname: The Cheetas
- Founded: 1996
- Ground: Phikwe Stadium; Selebi-Phikwe, Botswana
- Capacity: 9,000
- Chairman: Abel Israel
- Manager: Kenneth Mogae
- League: Botswana First Division North

FC Satmos is a football club from Botswana based in Selebi-Phikwe. SATMOS was originally called Copper Chiefs Football Club and was formed in 1996 by Late Samuel Thotogelo Molati Sono (SATMOS). The club is popularly known as the Cheetahs. It became a professional team in 1997. Its Motto is Youth Development and Professionalism. In 1997, FC Satmos was registered in the league and duly took the place of Copper Chiefs in the then Chibuku Second Division. The team was duly promoted to the first division, It came as no surprise as Satmos won the First Division campaign and was promoted to the elite league in 1999.

The club played in the Botswana Premier League in 2006–07, but were relegated to Botswana First Division North after finishing the league in the 16th position.

Jwaneng Galaxy FC sent FC Satmos to Debswana First Division League with a humiliating 6 nil defeat in the be MOBILE Premiership game at Selibe phikwe stadium on Saturday.
