= Lobatse Stadium =

Lobatse Sports Complex
- Interactive map of Lobatse Sports Complex
- Location: Lobatse, Botswana
- Coordinates: 25.2168°S 25.6761°E
- Capacity: 20,000 people

Lobatse Stadium is a multi-use stadium in Lobatse, Botswana. It is used mostly for football matches and serves as the home stadium of Extension Gunners. The stadium holds 20,000 people. There was a progressive construction of stadium in Lobatse which was expected to be done by end of 2010.
