= Orapa =

City in Northern Botswana

Coordinates: 21°20′02″S 25°21′53″E

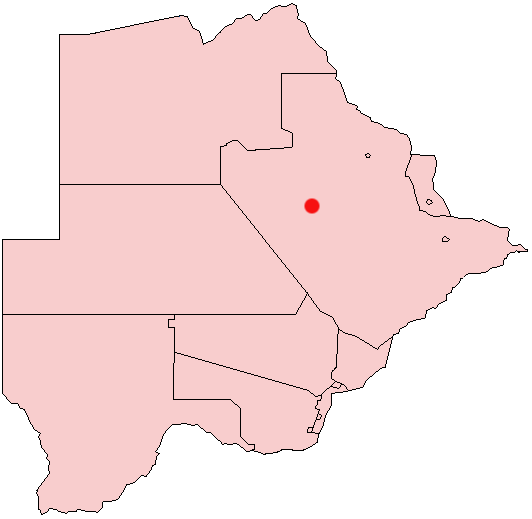
Location of Orapa in Botswana

Orapa is a town located in the Central District of Botswana. It is the site of the Orapa diamond mine, the largest diamond-producing mine in the world, and is considered to be the diamond capital of the country. Nearby is another kimberlite mine owned by Lucara Diamond, thought to have very large reserves of diamonds.

The town has four schools, one of which teaches in English, serving a community containing a high proportion of immigrants. The population in 1996 was approximately 10,000 which increased in the next 10 years and is still increasing due to mining output in line with development targets.

According to the 2022 Population and Household census, the population of Orapa stood at 8,648.

== See also ==
- Nwetwe Pan
- Sua Pan
