= Black Forest FC =

Football club in Botswana

- Full name: Black Forest Football Club
- Nickname: Magoleng
- Founded: 1998
- League: Botswana Premier League
- 2018-19: 16th (relegated)
colours

Black Forest FC is a football club from Mmankgodi, Botswana, currently playing in the Botswana Premier League. They are known as Magoleng by their fans. The club colours are green and black.

== History ==
The club were formed in 1998.

They were promoted to the Botswana Premier League after winning the 2015-16 Division One South. They hired Zimbabwean coach Gilbert Mushangazhike in 2017.
