= ECCO City Green =

ECCO City Greens
- Full name: ECCO City Greens Sporting Club
- Nickname: Mamoja Disckie
- Founded: 1992
- Ground: Francistown Stadium, Francistown, Botswana, 27,000 capacity
- Chairman: Dr. Kerapetse Sehularo
- Manager: Maxwel Malume Moyo
- League: Botswana First Division North
- 2017–18: 10th
Home colours

ECCO City Greens FC is a football club from Botswana based in Francistown.

== Honours ==
- Mascom Premier League: 1

2007

- Coca-Cola Cup: 1

Runner-up: 2007

== Current squad ==
Players:

- Zecco
- Mmilidzi
- Makafifiri
- Nicolas
- Matlhare
- Malepa Bolelang

== Players ==
Note: Flags indicate national team as defined under FIFA eligibility rules; some limited exceptions apply. Players may hold more than one non-FIFA nationality.

No.	Pos.	Nation	Player
13	FW	BOT	Malepa Bolelang
