= Uniao Flamengo Santos F.C. =

Uniao Flamengo Santos
- Full name: Uniao Flamengo Santos Football Club
- Nicknames: The Saints; Ma-Fourteen(14)
- Founded: 2003; 23 years ago
- Ground: UB Stadium, Gaborone, Botswana
- Capacity: 10,000
- Manager: (Botswana) Innocent Ranku
- League: Botswana Premier League
- 2025–26: T7th
Home colours

Uniao Flamengo Santos is a football club from Gabane, Botswana, based in Gaborone. They play their home matches at UB Stadium in Gaborone.

The club is named after two Brazilian clubs: Flamengo and Santos. Its colors, however, are blue and white, and its home kit is similar to the Argentine national team's.

Uniao Flamengo Santos was promoted to Botswana's top-level league, which is the Mascom Premier League, during the 2005–06 season, when the club finished in First Division South's first position. In 2006–07 the club finished in Mascom Premier League's eleventh position. Uniao Flamengo Santos finished in Mascom Premier League's third position in 2007–08 season.

== Achievements ==
- FA Challenge Cup (Botswana): 1

2009

== Performance in CAF competitions ==
- CAF Confederation Cup: 1 appearance

2010 – Preliminary Round
