= Security Systems F.C. =

- Full name: Security Systems XI Football Club
- Founded: 1990
- Coach: Daniel Nare
- League: Botswana First Division
- 2025–26: 3rd (Sourh)
colours	colours

Security Systems XI FC is a football club from Otse, Botswana, currently playing in the Botswana Premier League.

== History ==
SS XI FC won promotion to the 2012-13 Botswana Premier League, but failed to pay the subscription fee and were denied a spot in the top flight. They then lost to BR Highlanders in the promotion playoffs in 2013–14.

SS XI were then deregistered after the 2013–14 season and merged with second division Tsholofelo Rolling Boys. Rolling Boys were promoted again after the 2016 season and changed their name back to Security Systems for their first season in the top flight.
