= Mahalapye Railway Highlanders =

BR Highlanders
- Full name: Mahalapye Railway Highlanders
- Nickname: Stimela
- Short name: MR Highlanders
- Founded: 1987
- Ground: Serowe Sports Complex
- Capacity: 6600
- Coach: Blessing Moyo
- League: Botswana Premier League
colours

Mahalapye Railway Highlanders are a football club in the Botswana Premier League who play home games in Molepolole, but are based out of Mahalapye.

Mahalapye Railway Highlanders, previously Botswana Railway Highlanders, are the team of Botswana Railways, but the company's sponsorship only goes as far as transport and some sporting equipment. In 2015 Highlanders were 100% financed by the Railways corporation.

== History ==
Highlanders were founded as a social club in 1987 by workers of Botswana Railways.

In 2002 they were promoted to the first division for the first time, led by coach Tebogo Mokute.

They were promoted to the top division Botswana Premier League for the first time for the 2012 season.

Highlanders were relegated from the Botswana Premier league in 2016. They bounced back in the 2017–18 season: Highlanders were promoted to the 2018-19 Botswana Premier League after defeating Great North Tigers 1–0 in the second-last game of the season. Emmanuel Thakadu scored the goal which sent Highlanders back to the top flight two minutes from time, ensuring Highlanders won the 2017-18 First Division North title.
