= Motlakase Power Dynamos =

- Full name: Motlakase Power Dynamos
- Nickname: Chouka
- Founded: 1988; 38 years ago
- Manager: Pule Mogotsi
- League: Botswana First Division North
- 2018–19: 4th
Home colours

Motlakase Power Dynamos is a football club based in Palapye, Botswana, competing in the second division Botswana First Division North.

In the 2015–16 season they were relegated after finishing 14th in the Botswana Premier League.

== History ==
The club, then called Motlakase FC, won the 2009 Botswana First Division South title with 54 points, eight better than Miscellaneous FC of Serowe, earning them promotion to the Botswana Premier League. They renamed to Motlakase Power Dynamos during the 2009 season break.

The club were relegated from the Premier League at the end of the 2010–11 season. This ended two consecutive seasons of top flight football for the Palapye club.

The team won the Botswana First Division North in 2011–12 to immediately return to the top division of football in Botswana. Part of the reason why the 2010–11 season went so poorly is because the club were forced to play games in Francistown during the construction of their stadium.

Dynamos were relegated from the Botswana Premier League on the final day of the 2016 season. Dynamos lost 2–0 to Extension Gunners, while Green Lovers FC, who were below them in the table, got the road win they needed to clinch survival.

They qualified for the promotion playoffs in 2017, losing to Santos FC.
