= Gilport Lions F.C. =

- Full name: Gilport Lions Football Club
- Founded: 1969
- Ground: Lobatse Stadium; Lobatse, Botswana
- Capacity: 20,000
- Chairman: Agambir Dhaliwal
Home colours	Away colours

Gilport Lions Football Club is a soccer club from Botswana based in Lobatse. Gilport Lions team colours are green and white. The club was previously called Botswana Meat Commission F.C.. They won the FA Challenge Cup in 2016.

== History ==
The club was founded in 1969 by workers at the Botswana Meat Commission in Lobatse. They won the 2007 FA Challenge Cup, defeating ECCO City Greens F.C. on penalties. They also made the cup final in 1996, losing 2–0 to Township Rollers. In 2015, the club's ownership changed, with owners Kelesitse and Portia Gilika changing the club's name to Gilport Lions. The word "Gilport" is derived from their names.

== Stadium ==
Gilport Lions F.C.'s home ground is Lobatse Sports Complex, which is situated between the hills in Lobatse, Peleng, next to Peleng river and around 75 km from Gaborone Athletic track and indoor sports arena. Its capacity is 20,000.

== Performance in CAF competitions ==
- CAF Cup – 1996

defeated by Mamelodi Sundowns in the first round
