= Nico United =

- Full name: BCL Nico United Sporting Club
- Nicknames: Majombolo; Baby Jombies
- Founded: 1969
- Ground: Selebi-Phikwe, Botswana
- Chairman: Robert Wankie
- Manager: Peter Muchine
- League: Botswana Premier League
- 2025–26: 8th

BCL Nico United Sporting Club is an association football club based in Selebi-Phikwe, Botswana, about 420 kilometres from the capital Gaborone. Their name of "Nico", which has been the target of jokes and Internet memes since Love Live! School Idol Project gained popularity, comes from the copper and nickel-mining complex that Selebi-Phikwe is known for.

Nico was promoted back to the Premier League following the 2022 season.

== History ==
Nico United was founded in 1969. The club was promoted to the Botswana Premier League for the first time in the 2004–05 season after spending the 2003–04 season playing in the First Division North.

== Honours ==
- FA Challenge Cup: 2

1986, 1987
