= Sankoyo Bush Bucks F.C. =

Sankoyo Bush Bucks
- Full name: Sankoyo Bush Bucks Football Club
- Nickname: Ngurungu Boys
- Founded: 1996; 30 years ago
- Ground: AfroTel Stadium
- Manager: Gadimang Tiiso
- League: Botswana First Division
- 2018–19: 14th, relegated

Sankoyo Bush Bucks Football Club is an association football club from Sankoyo, Botswana. They formerly played in the top domestic Botswana Premier League until their relegation in 2019. They play home games in Maun.

Their colours are green and white. Their nickname is "Ngurungu", the local name for a bushbuck.

== History ==
Sankoyo Bush Bucks were founded in 1996 and began play in 2000. They gained promotion to the Premier League in 2014, becoming the first team from the northwestern Nhabe region to play in the Botswana top flight.

The Bush Bucks were docked 29 points after the end of the 2015 season which meant they would be relegated after using an unregistered player, Zimbabwean Morris Ruzivo. However, they won their appeal and remained in the Botswana Premier League. They were relegated at the end of the 2019 season.

== Ownership ==
The team has been largely supported by the Sankoyo Community Trust. The trust contributed about P200,000 each season to support the team.

== Coaches ==
- Philani Mabhena (2016)
- Drago Stanalojvic (2016)
