= Miscellaneous SC Serowe =

Miscellaneous Sporting Club
- Full name: Miscellaneous Sporting Club
- Nicknames: Tse Nala, Mmamonotwane,
- Founded: 1962
- Ground: Serowe Sports Complex, Serowe
- Capacity: 6,600
- Chairman: Seiphetho Sefhako
- Manager: Chippa Koolese
- League: Debswana First Division North League
- 2021/22: 9th
- Website: https://www.miscellaneoussc.co.bw

Miscellaneous Sporting Club is a football club based in Serowe, Botswana. The club is currently playing in the Botswana Premier League. Miscellaneous is also known as Tsenala (the red and white) and Mmamonotwane, the official nicknames of the club. The club is also often referred to as Matswakabele (Miscellaneous), a nickname that developed in the early days but has never been officially adopted by the club. The club's colours are red, white and green.

The team is owned by its supporters. The society's membership elects the Miscellaneous executive committee at annual general meetings. The team has a strong following outside Botswana, most notably in Scotland.

== History ==
The first President of Botswana, Sir Seretse Khama, formed Miscellaneous in 1962 when he returned from exile. At the time, Khama is reported to have found Motherwell F.C. being the only side supported in the village. He formed Miscellaneous and recruited some players from Motherwell.

Miscellaneous was successful in its early years, competing in the National First Division in the 1970s, the only elite division at the time. It developed several players who later starred in other Gaborone teams including Township Rollers, Gaborone United and BDF XI. The club was later relegated and never regained its former glory.

The royal family has remained involved in leadership of Serowe. Seretse passed on the chairmanship of the club to his son Ian in the 1970s, but remained its Life President.
