= Orapa United F.C. =

Orapa United
- Full name: Orapa United Football Club
- Nicknames: The Ostriches, Bo Mmanche
- Founded: 2012
- Ground: Itekeng Stadium, Orapa, Central, Botswana
- Capacity: 5,000
- League: Botswana Premier League
- 2025–26: 6th
| Home colours | Away colours |

Orapa United FC is a Botswana football club based in Orapa. The team currently plays in Botswana Premier League having gained promotion from Botswana First Division North League in the 2013–14 season.

The club was founded by Johane Mchive, Tidimalo Tito and Kaisara Kaisara in 2012 by merging five football clubs in the Orapa Township. Kaisara Kaisara served as Orapa United's first Interim chairman until he called the first elective Annual General Meeting.

The club reached three consecutive Mascom Top 8 Cup finals from 2016 to 2018, the premier cup competition in Botswana. They beat Township Rollers in the 2016 final. They again defeated Township Rollers in the 2020 final.

== Achievements ==
=== League ===
- Botswana Premier League: 0

runners up 2014–15

- Botswana First Division North: 1

Winners 2012–13

=== Cup competitions ===
- FA Challenge Cup: 1

2018–19.

- Mascom Top 8 Cup: 2

2016, 2020.

== Performance in CAF competitions ==
- CAF Champions League: 0 appearance

- CAF Confederation Cup: 2 appearances

2017 – Preliminary Round
2019 – Preliminary Round
2025 – Group Stage

== Stadium ==
Currently the team plays at the 5000 capacity Itekeng Stadium.
