= Botswana Police XI SC =

- Full name: Botswana Police XI Sporting Club
- Nickname: The Jungle Kings
- Founded: 1977
- Ground: Botswana National Stadium; Gaborone, Botswana
- Capacity: 25,000
- League: Botswana Premier League
- 2025–26: 11th
Home colours

Botswana Police XI Sporting Club is a football (soccer) club from Botswana based in village of Otse south of Gaborone.

== Achievements ==
- Botswana Premier League: 1

2006

- Botswana First Division North: 1

2024-25

- Botswana FA Cup: 1

1983

== Performance in CAF competitions ==
- CAF Champions League: 2 appearances

2006 - Preliminary Round
2007 - Preliminary Round

- CAF Cup: 1 appearance

1999 - First Round
