= Botswana Defence Force XI F.C. =

Defence Force XI FC
- Full name: Botswana Defence Force XI Football Club
- Founded: 1978
- Ground: SSKB Stadium; Mogoditshane, Botswana
- Capacity: 5,000
- Manager: Letang Kgengwenyane
- League: Botswana Premier League
- 2025–26: 12th
Home colours

Botswana Defence Force XI Football Club is a football club from Botswana based in Mogoditshane and playing home games in Gaborone. It is the club of the Botswana Defence Force, composed mostly of military players. As of 2007, players were eligible to play for the club once they became cadets. In 2016, the club reduced the number of civilian players on the team, citing financial concerns.

== History ==
BDF XI were founded in 1978, a year after the Botswana Defence Force came into existence. BDF XI have won the Botswana Premier League seven times, most recently in 2004.

== Honours ==
- Botswana Premier League: 7

1981, 1988, 1989, 1991, 1997, 2002, 2004

- Botswana Challenge Cup: 3

1989, 1998, 2004

- Botswana Independence Cup: 2

2001, 2002

== Performance in CAF competitions ==
- CAF Champions League: 2 appearances

1998 – Preliminary Round
2003 – Preliminary Round

- African Cup of Champions Clubs: 4 appearances

1982 – First Round
1989 – First Round
1990 – Preliminary Round
1992 – Preliminary Round

- CAF Confederation Cup: 2 appearances

2005 – First Round
2015 – Preliminary Round

- CAF Cup: 1 appearance

2002 – Second Round

- CAF Cup Winners' Cup: 1 appearance

1999 – First Round

== Players ==
Note: Flags indicate national team as defined under FIFA eligibility rules; some limited exceptions apply. Players may hold more than one non-FIFA nationality.

No.	Pos.	Nation	Player
—	DF	BOT	Mompati Thuma
—	MF	BOT	Patrick Motsepe
—	MF	BOT	Ogomoditse Bauleni

No.	Pos.	Nation	Player
—	FW	BOT	Mokgathi Mokgathi
—	FW	BOT	Ofentse Mmipi

== Notable people ==
- Louis Setshwane – former international footballer, BDF XI manager (2016–17 season)
