= Extension Gunners FC =

Extension Gunners F.C.
- Full name: Extension Gunners Football Club
- Nicknames: Mapantsula; Ezi Mnyama; Guna Guna
- Founded: 1962
- Ground: Lobatse Stadium; Lobatse, Botswana
- Capacity: 20,000
- Owner: Alfred ‘Ally’ Kgomongwe
- League: Botswana Premier League
- 2025–26: 13th
Home colours	Away colours	Third colours

Extension Gunners FC is a football club based in Lobatse, Botswana. The team plays in the Botswana Premier League They play at the Lobatse Sports Complex.

== History ==
The club was founded in 1962 in the town of Lobatse as the Lobatse CS Gunners.

== Achievements ==
- Botswana Premier League: 3

1992, 1993, 1994

- Coca-Cola Cup Winners: 3

1988, 1992, 2011

- Botswana Independence Cup: 1

1989

== Performance in CAF competitions ==
- African Cup of Champions Clubs: 3 appearances

1993: Preliminary Round
1994: First Round
1995: Preliminary Round

- CAF Confederation Cup: 1 appearance

2012:
