= List of hospitals in Botswana =

Districts in Botswana

This is a List of hospitals in Botswana. There are 624 medical facilities in Botswana, including 26 public hospitals. Botswana had an estimated population of 2,352,000 in 2020. The first tier of public hospitals are located in rural areas that each serve a maximum of 10,000 people. Each hospital has between 20 and 70 beds. The second tier of public hospitals consists of seven district hospitals located in larger villages and cities. They have between 71 and 250 beds. The third tier of public hospitals has three referral based specialized hospitals.

== South-East District ==
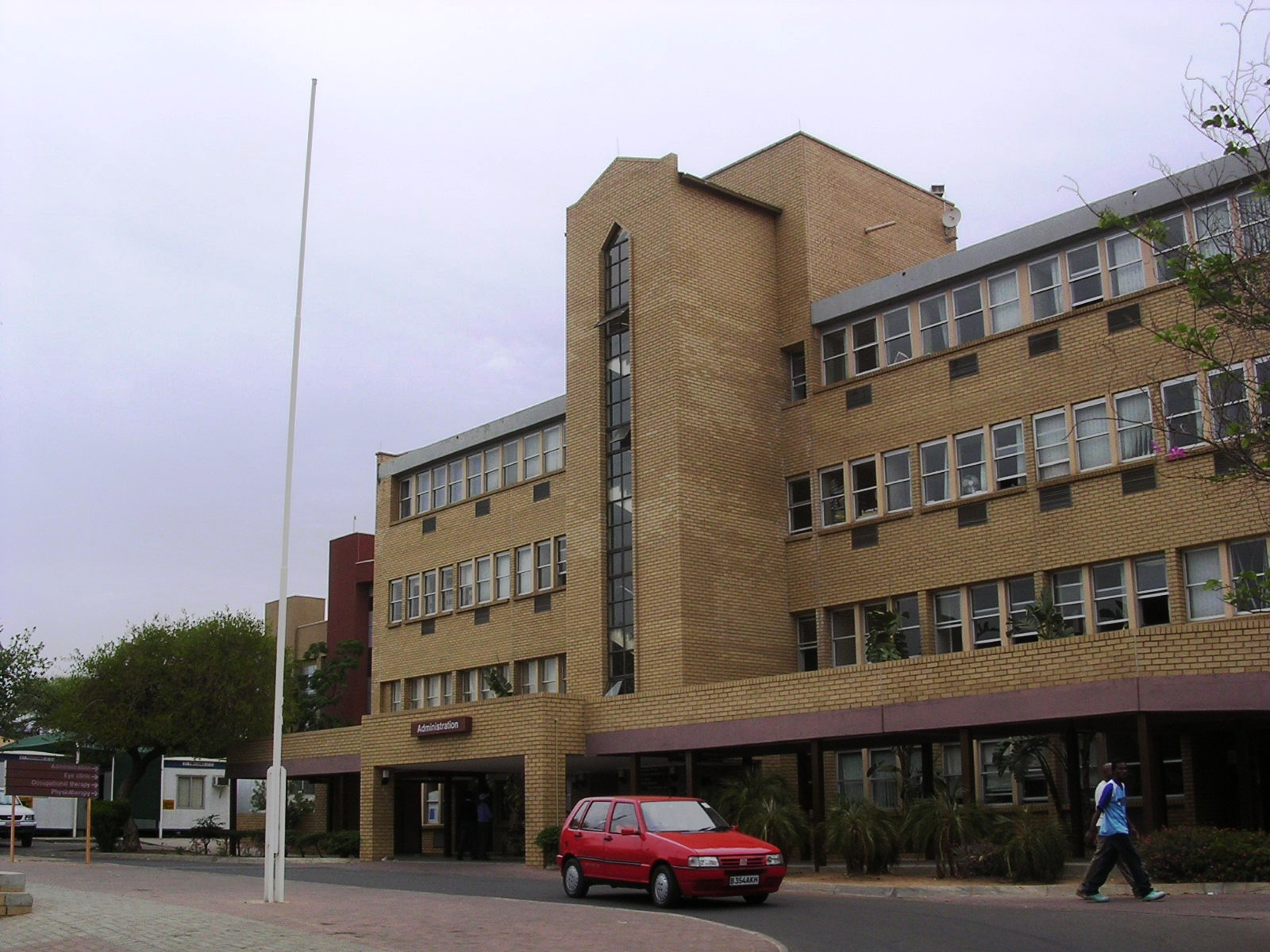
Princess Marina Provincial Hospital

Hospitals and clinics are located in three cities in the South-East District include:

Gaborone

- Avenue Medical Center
- Capital Medical Center
- Gaborone Children Care Clinic
- Life Gaborone Private Hospital
- Independence Surgery Molefi Close
- Karong Clinics
- LenMed Health Bokamoso Private Hospital
- Medical Center (Gaborone, Botswana)
- The Medical Clinic
- Middlestar Clinic
- Princess Marina Hospital
- Sidilega Private Hospital
- Sir Ketumile Masire Teaching Hospital

Lobatse

- Athlone District Hospital
- Sbrana Psychiatric Hospital
- Supra Sight Hospital

Ramotswa

- Bamalete Lutheran Hospital

== North-East District ==
Hospitals in the North-East District include:

- Riverside Hospital, Francistown
- Francistown Academic Hospital, Francistown
- Nyangabgwe Referral Hospital, Francistown
- Gweta Primary Hospital, Gweta
- Masunga Primary Hospital, Masunga
- Tutume Primary Hospital, Tutume

== Central District ==
The following hospitals are in the Central District:

- Bobonong Primary Hospital, Bobonong
- Lelhakane Primary Hospital, Letlhakane
- Mahalapye District Hospital, Mahalapye
- Mmadinare Primary Hospital, Mmadinare
- Orapa Hospital, Orapa
- Palapye Primary Hospital, Palapye
- Rakops Primary Hospital, Rakops
- Sefhare Primary Hospital, Sefhare
- Selibe Phikwe Government Hospital, Selibe Phikwe
- Sekgoma Memorial Hospital, Serowe

== Ngamiland (North-West District) ==
Hospitals in the North-West District (also called Ngamiland) include:

- Doctors Inn, Maun
- Letsholathebe II Memorial Hospital, Maun
- Maun General Hospital, Maun
- Maun Private Hospital
- Prime Health Medical Center
- Gumare Primary Hospital, Gumare

== Southern District ==
There are three hospitals in the Southern District:

- Good Hope Primary Hospital, Good Hope, Botswana
- Debswana Jwaneng Mine Hospital, Jwanengl
- Kanye Seventh-day Adventist Hospital, Kanye

== South-East District ==
There is one hospital in the South-East District:

- Bamalete Lutheran Hospital, Ramotswa

== Chobe and Ghanzi Districts ==
The following hospitals are in the Chobe District and Ghanzi District.

- Kasane Primary Hospital, Chobe District
- Gantsi Primary Hospital, Ghanzi District

== Kgatleng District ==
There is one hospital in the Kgatleng District:

- Deborah Retief Memorial Hospital, Mochudi

== Kgalagadi District ==
There are two hospitals in the Kgalagadi District:

- Hukuntsi Primary Hospital
- Tsabong Primary Hospital

== Kweneng District ==
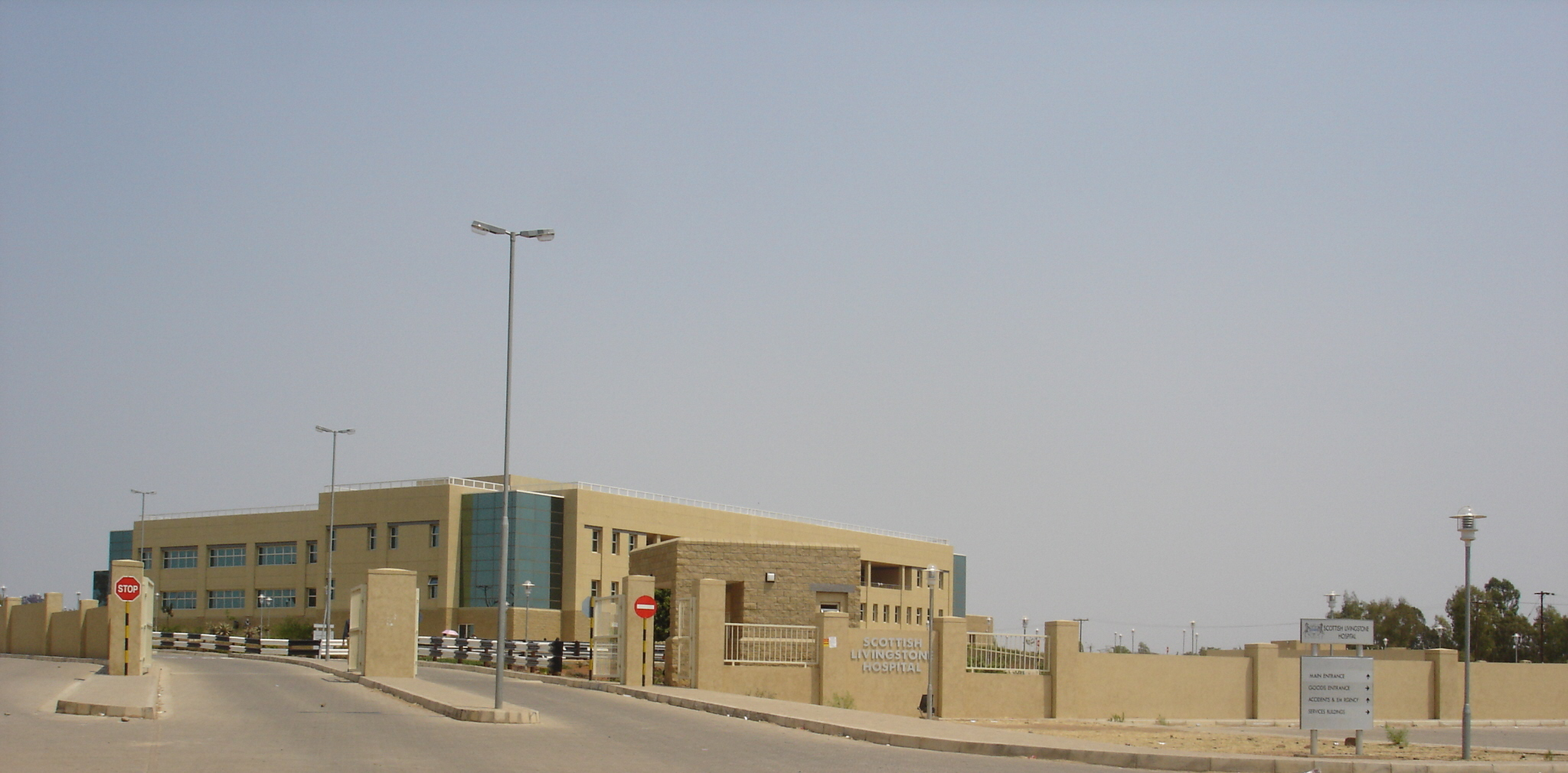
Scottish Livingstone Hospital in Molepole

There are two hospitals in the Kweneng District:

- Scottish Livingstone Hospital, Molepolole
- Thamaga Primary Hospital, Thamaga

== See also ==
- Districts of Botswana
- Health in Botswana
