= Lejwana, Botswana =

Lejwana
- Location within Botswana
- Coordinates: 25°24′23″S 25°32′2″E
- Country: Botswana

Population (2011)
  - Total: 621

Lejwana, Botswana is a small village in the Republic of Botswana in Africa. It is situated in the Southern District of Botswana. It lies between the coordinates 25°24'23S and 25°32'27E. It is situated between the villages of Gathwane, Pitsane, Kgoro, and Digawana. Lejwana is about 30 km from Lobatse and about 100 km by road from the capital Gaborone.

== Royalty and History ==
The Kgosi of Lejwana (a small hill) is His Highness Neo Letlhare. The old man, Kgosi Taolelo Letlhare, has retired and handed over to the incumbent, being his son Kgosi Neo Letlhare. Taolelo is the son of Kgethelo, born of Letlhare. Letlhare was sent as a tribal headman of Mongala ward to establish Lejwana in 1902. This was a result of what happened after "British Bechuanaland" was divided into two in 1895, between a Colony on the south of Molopo and a Protectorate (modern-day Botswana) on the northern side. Kgosi Montshioa of Barolong, along with the then leading Batlhaping Kgosi, Mankurwane, complained of being left out of a protectorate as they preferred to be on the protectorate side. Then-High Commissioner, Sir Williams considered their plea and negotiated with Kgosi Bathoen I to give a piece of Bangwaketse Land.

Bathoen relented and gave them land between Ramatlabama, Pitsane, Kgoro Hill, Mogobewakgomo, Mokgomane and Phitshane.Hence Good hope was established as a new capital of BaRolong baga Montshioa. Bathoen then took out his trusted men from Kanye to ensure that Batlhaping and Barolong tribes do not settle in the Ngwaketse Homeland. Letlhare was therefore one of the headmen taken out of Kanye and settled in an area then known as GaBatlhaping. Other headmen given the assignment were Makaba in Gathwane, Selerio in Mokgomane and little is known as to who was assigned to settle in Phitshane. All these men were Bathoen's uncles.

Kgosi Letlhare arrived with his brother Motseotsile from Kanye and other tribesmen Nkgelepang and Sennye. Letlhare's younger brother, in the junior house, Magogodi, was left to take care of the Mongala kgotla in Kanye. Magogodi had issue, bearing Gaopatwe (recently deceased Chief of Ga-Segwagwa), Ramokhana and others.

== Climate ==
The climate of Lejwana is similar to that of the rest of southern Botswana. Winter starts in May and ends in July. The minimum temperature is 4 °C and the maximum is 24 °C. The coldest months are June (Seetebosigo, which literally means, do not visit at night) and July. Summer is from August to April (as it is usually called by the local people though there are three seasons within the time period being spring, summer and autumn), the temperatures range from 15 °C to 31 °C. This is the period in which it usually rains in Lejwana with the minimum of 5.8mm and the maximum of 143mm depending on the month.

== Demographics ==
The population of Lejwana city according to the 2001 Central Statistics Office population census was 621. Since this census, the population has increased due to people migrating to the village and the high birth rate and low death rate, thanks to the recent increase in the Botswana life expectancy.

== Education ==
Lejwana has one primary school, called Lejwana Primary School, which opened its doors around 1984. There is no elementary school and students go to Nthwalang Secondary School in Digawana for junior education and then to either LobSec or Good Hope Senior Secondary School for high school education.

== Economy ==
Lejwana is a small village with little development, and was rated one of the ten or twenty poorest villages in Botswana in 2015.

The people are dependent on farming, with almost each and every household having a piece of land at the back of the house for ploughing. The village has one shop, Lerothodi General Dealer, which has been the core market for the village for many years now. There are a number of tuckshops, and a bar which opens during the festive season only.
