= Athlone District Hospital =

Hospital in Botswana

Athlone Hospital
- Botswana Ministry of Health
- Location in Botswana

Geography
- Location: Lobatse, Kweneng, Botswana
- Coordinates: 25°13′S 25°40′E

Organisation
- Type: District
- Affiliated university: University of Botswana
- Patron: None

Helipads
- Helipad: No

History
- Founded: 1929

Links
- Other links: List of hospitals in Botswana

Athlone Hospital, also known as Lobatse Hospital, is a government-run district hospital located in Lobatse, Botswana. With bed capacity of 700

== History ==
Athlone hospital (Athlone DHMT) is considered to be one of the first hospitals in Botswana, located in Lobatse, a town in South-Eastern Botswana, 70 kilometres south of the capital Gaborone, situated in a valley running north towards Gaborone. Considered to be the largest hospital in Lobatse and a teaching hospital for many medical graduates. It is established in year 1929 and it's a government institution. The hospital consists of the following departments: internal medicine, pediatrics, gynecology and obstetrics, accident and emergency, radiology, dentistry, ophthalmology.
