= Mohutsiwa =

Mohutsiwa is a surname from Botswana. Notable people with the surname include:

- Gape Mohutsiwa (born 1997), Motswana footballer
- Siyanda Mohutsiwa (born 1993), Motswana writer and speaker
