= Princess Marina =

Princess Marina may refer to:

- Princess Marina Petrovna of Russia (1892–1981), daughter of Grand Duke Peter Nikolaevich of Russia and Grand Duchess Militza
- Princess Marina of Greece and Denmark (1906–1968), wife of Prince George, Duke of Kent, son of George V and Queen Mary
- Marina, Princess of Naples (born 1935), wife of Vittorio Emanuele, Prince of Naples
- Marina Karella (born 1940), wife of Prince Michael of Greece and Denmark
- Princess Marina Hospital, Gaborone, Botswana
- Princess Marina, 13th-century Russian princess, daughter-in-law of Yuri II of Vladimir
