= Good Hope Primary Hospital =

Hospital in Botswana

- Botswana Ministry of Health
- Location in Botswana

Geography
- Location: Good Hope, Southern District, Botswana
- Coordinates: 25°28′1.64″S 25°26′21.17″E

Organisation
- Type: Primary
- Affiliated university: None
- Patron: None

Helipads
- Helipad: No

Links
- Other links: List of hospitals in Botswana

Good Hope Primary Hospital is a government-run district hospital located in Good Hope, Botswana.
