= Nyangabgwe Referral Hospital =

Hospital in Botswana

Nyangabgwe Hospital
- Botswana Ministry of Health
- Location in Botswana

Geography
- Location: Francistown, North East District, Botswana
- Coordinates: 21°10′25″S 27°30′45″E

Organisation
- Care system: Public
- Type: District General
- Affiliated university: None
- Patron: None

Services
- Emergency department: 24 Hours
- Beds: 550 beds

Helipads
- Helipad: No

History
- Founded: 1989

Links
- Other links: List of hospitals in Botswana

Nyangabgwe Referral Hospital is a district general hospital in Francistown, Botswana, The hospital was established in 1989.

== History ==
Nyangabgwe Referral Hospital was established in 1989. It is a Government of Botswana health institution. The hospital is located in the second largest city of Botswana called Francistown. Nyangabgwe has 550 beds, (120-150) beds at the Internal Medicine Department. It is connected to the government of Botswana database system.

=== Internal Medicine Department ===
This department serves several wards at the hospital from the male medical ward, female medical ward, private ward and isolation ward.

== Services ==
The hospital's 24-hour emergency department is able to cater for adults and children. The hospital departments include a Rehabilitation Centre, pharmacy, anti-retroviral treatment for patients with HIV infection and AIDS, post-trauma counseling services, occupational services, laundry services, kitchen services and a mortuary.

== Facilities ==
Nyangabgwe Referral hospital has an annex, consisting of about 550 beds, space with the basic medical equipment for conducting series of diagnostic test.
