= Letsholathebe II Memorial Hospital =

Hospital in Botswana

Letsholathebe Memorial Hospital
- Botswana Ministry of Health
- Location in Botswana

Geography
- Location: Maun, Central District (Botswana), Botswana
- Coordinates: 19°59′S 023°25′E

Organisation
- Type: District General
- Affiliated university: None
- Patron: None

Helipads
- Helipad: No

History
- Founded: 25 September 2008

Links
- Other links: List of hospitals in Botswana

Letsholathebe Memorial Hospital is a government-founded district general hospital located in Maun, is the fifth largest town in Botswana. As of 2011, it had a population of 55,784. Maun is the "tourism capital" of Botswana and the administrative centre of Ngamiland district.

== History ==
Letsholathebe Memorial hospital is established in September 2008 by the government of Botswana. The institution serves the public community in Botswana. It operates under leadership of chief medical officer Mr. Richard Kambinda.
