= National Botanical Garden (Botswana) =

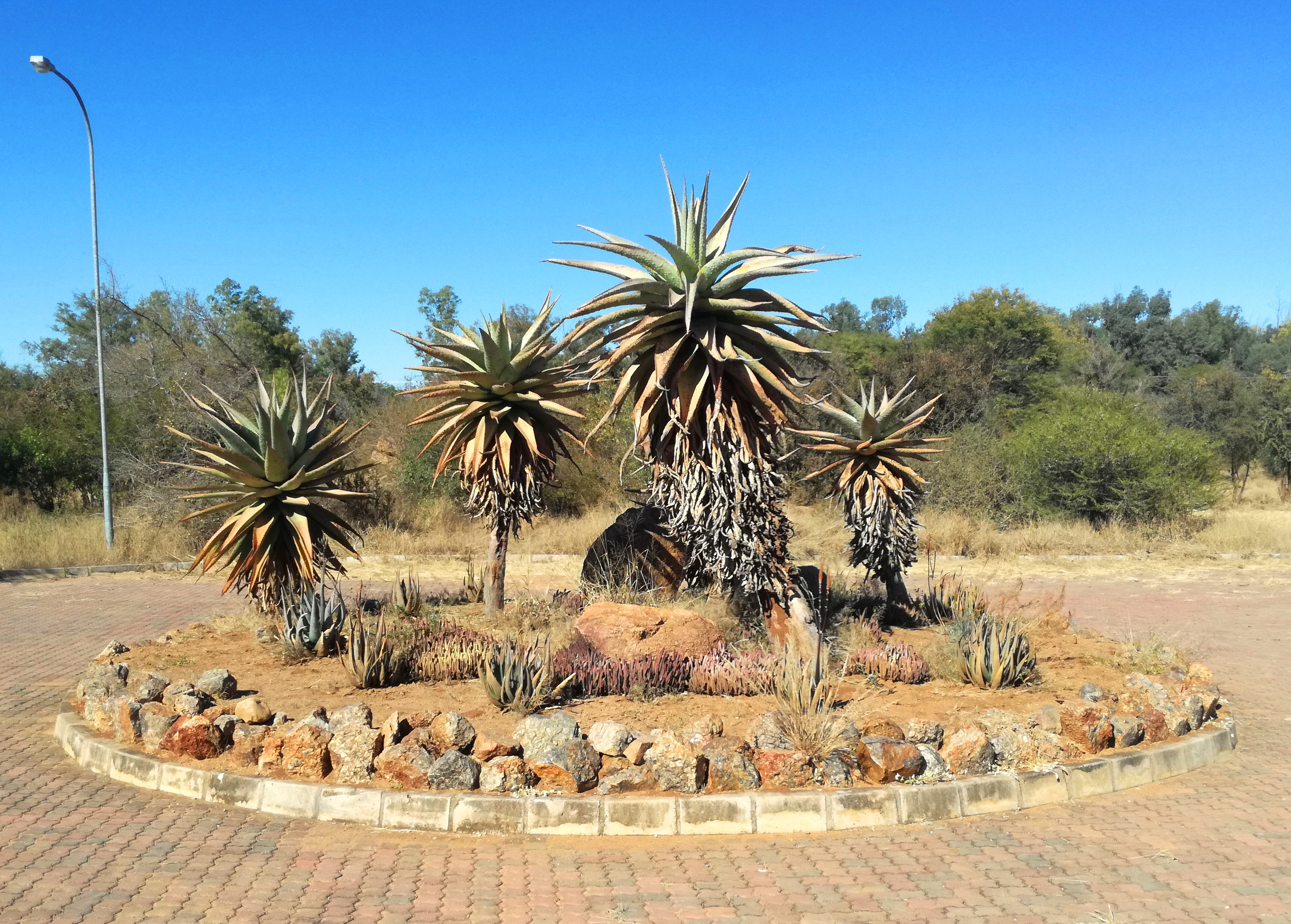

- Location within Botswana
- Location: Okwa Road, The Village
- Nearest city: Gaborone, Botswana
- Coordinates: 24°40′00″S 25°56′42″E
- Area: 7 hectares (17 acres)
- Created: November 2, 2007
- Operator: Botswana National Museum
- Open: Monday to Friday: 8:00am to 12:30pm and 2:00pm to 4:00pm. NBG is closed during public holidays and weekends.

The National Botanical Garden is a 7-hectare (17-acre) park located along the Notwane River 3 kilometres (1.9 mi) south-east of the city center of Gaborone.

The National Botanical Garden first opened on 2 November 2007, with the purpose of protecting Botswana's heritage. The park is managed under the Natural History Division of the Botswana National Museum. It is the first botanical garden in Botswana, housing indigenous plants from around Botswana.

== Layout ==
The garden is composed of six sections corresponding to six different ecological regions in Botswana. The six regions and common plants found in that region are

- Chobe – Moporota (sausage tree) and Mukusi (Pod Mahogany)
- Okavango And Salt Pans – Tsaro (Wild Date Palm) and Mokolwane (Ilala Palm)
- Mophane Woodland – Mophane and Monepenepe (Long-tail Cassia)
- North-Eastern Kalahari – Mokgwapha (Mountain Aloe) and Mosunyana (Umbrella Thorn)
- Mashatu – Motha (Nyala Tree) and More-o-mosetlha (Fever Tree)
- South Western Kalahari – Hoodia and grasses

In addition to displaying indigenous plants, the park also is in charge of maintaining botanical monuments around the country like the morula tree in Gaborone under which the first meeting of the Botswana Democratic Party was held.

== Gallery ==
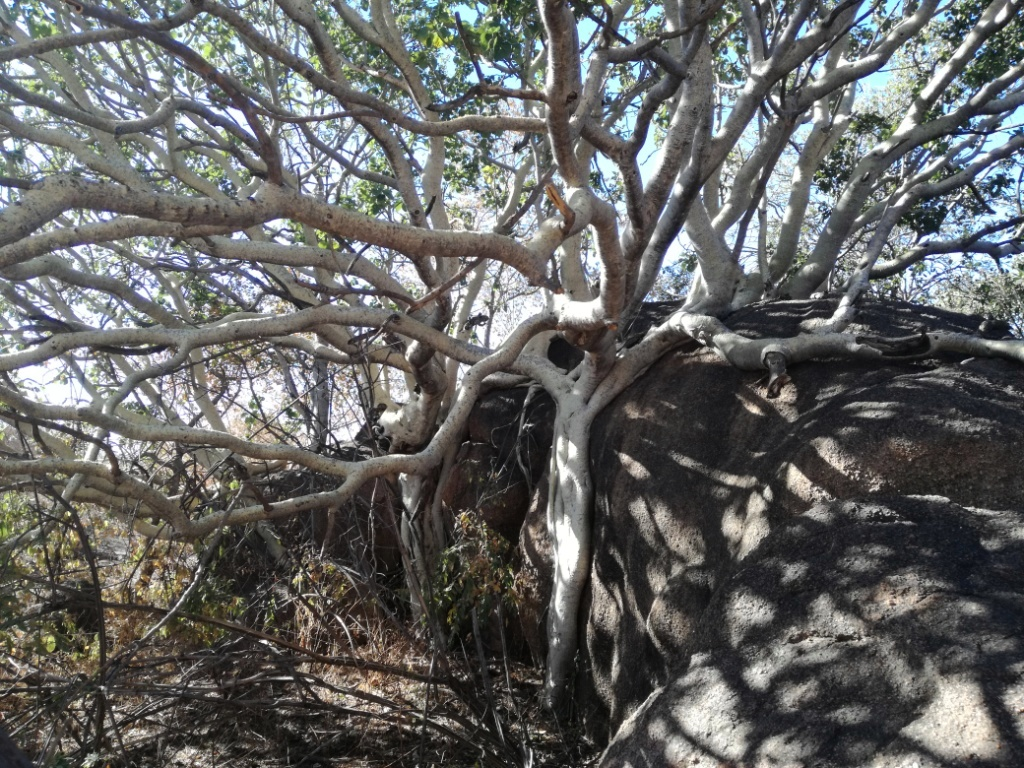

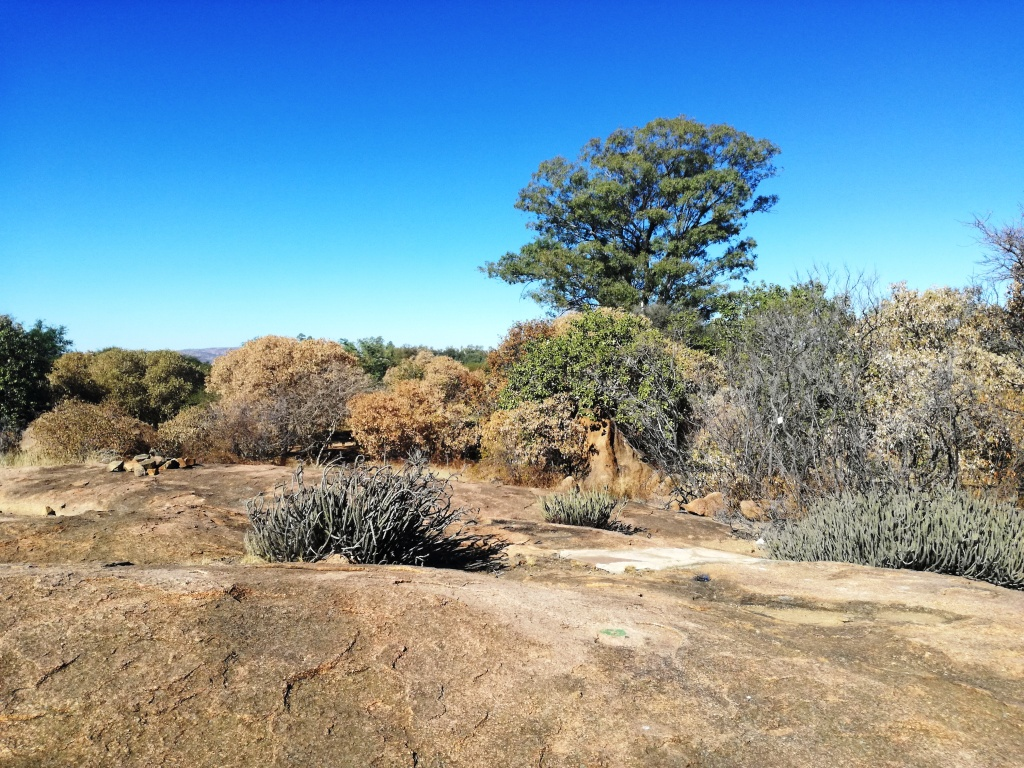

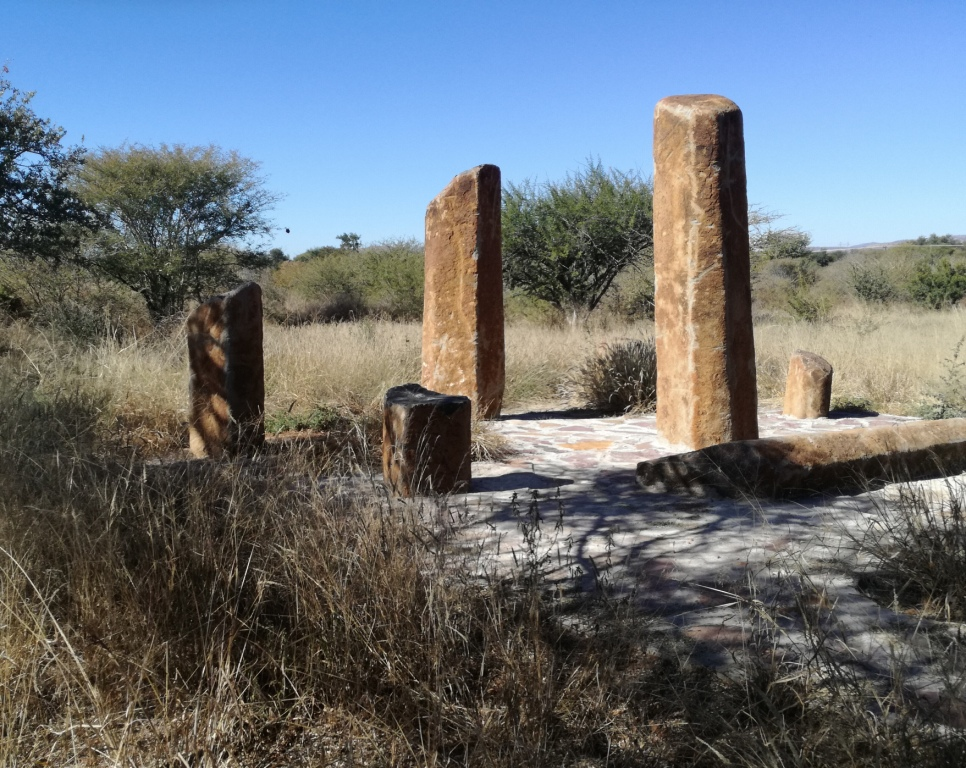

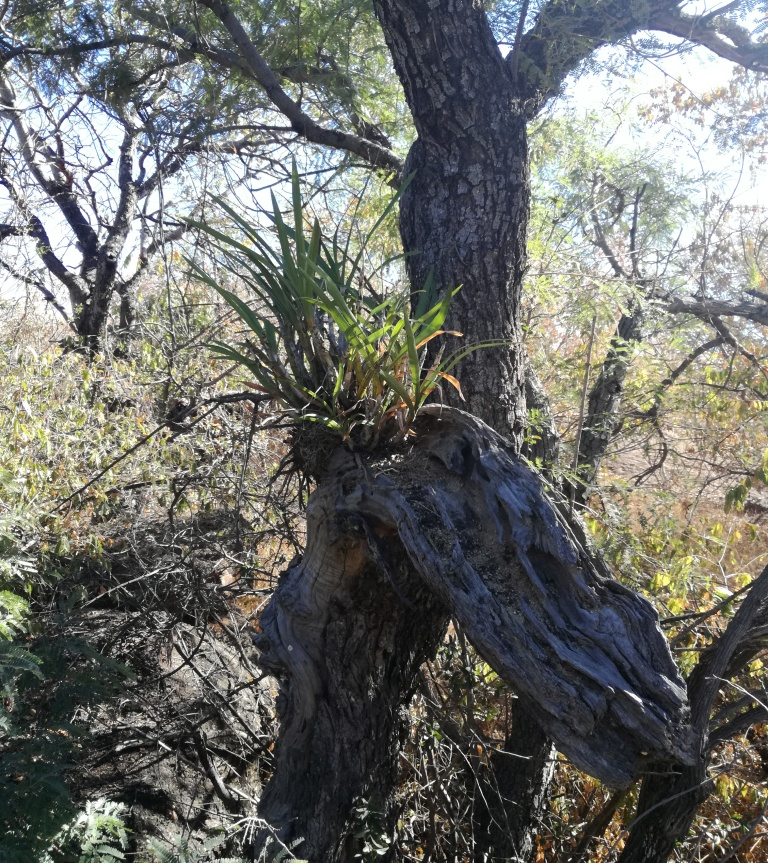

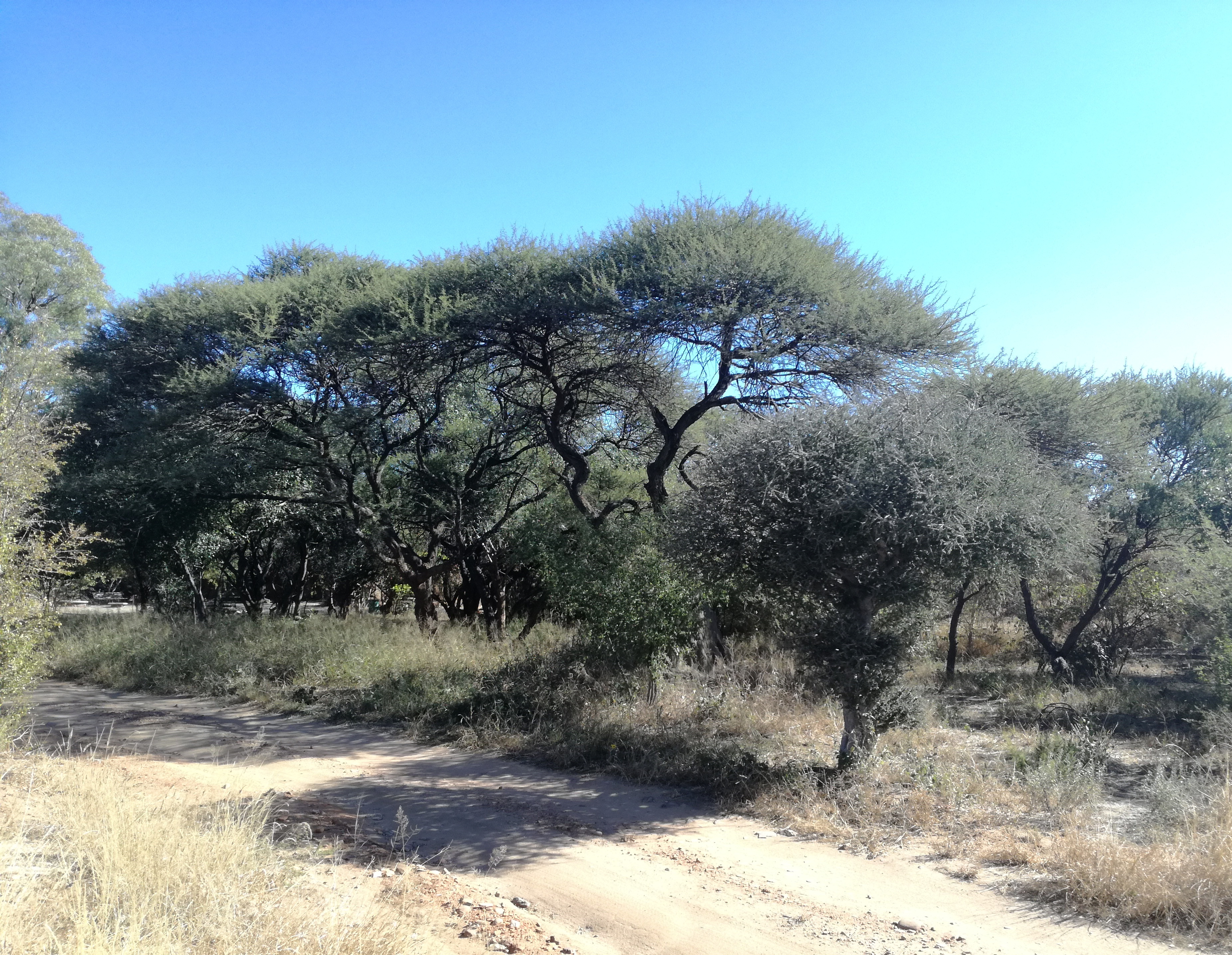

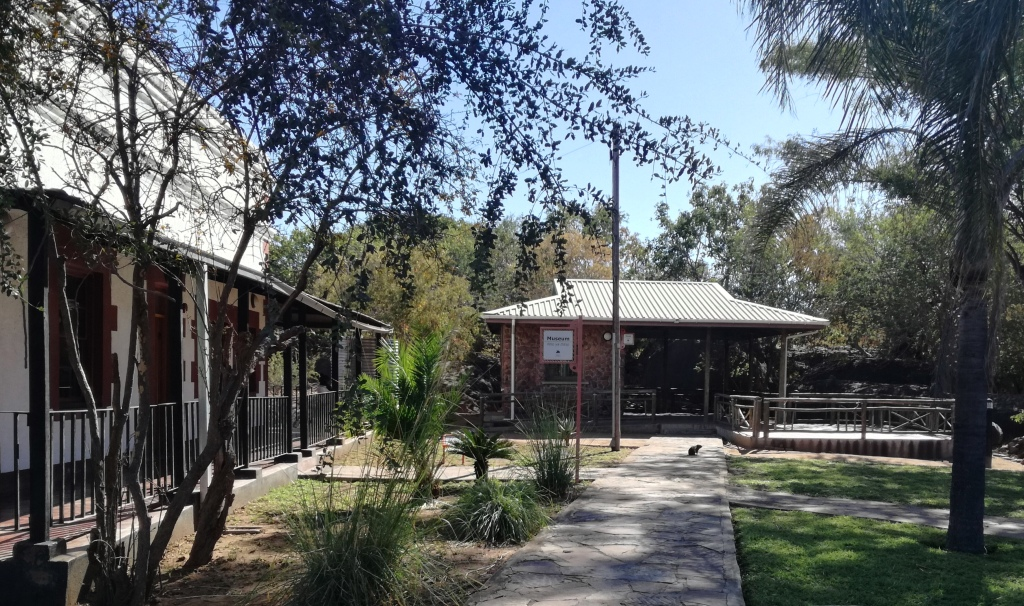

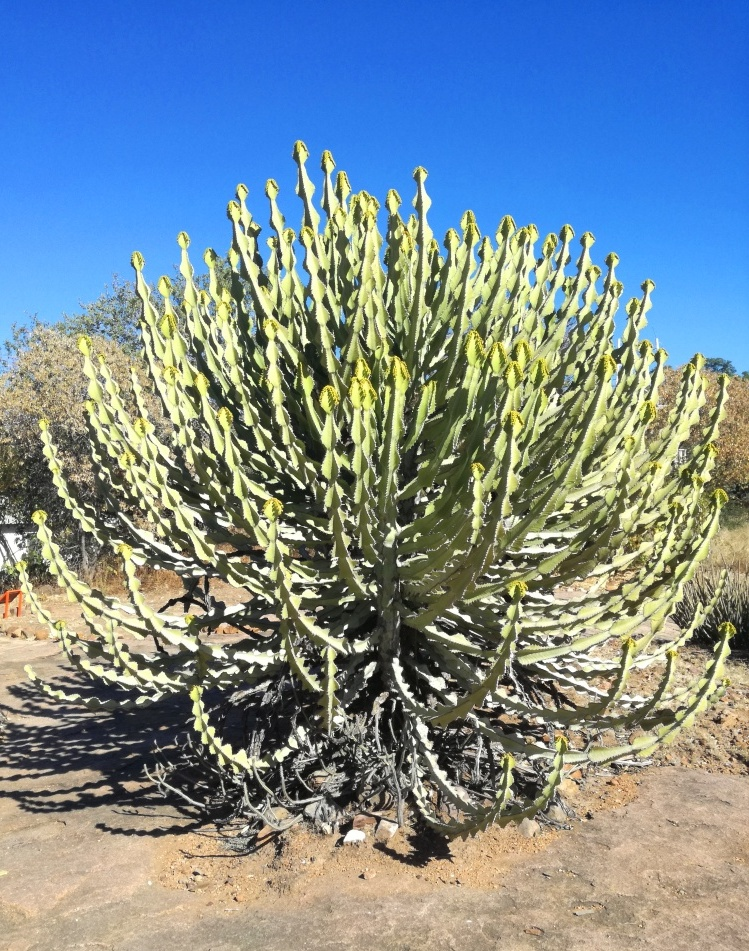

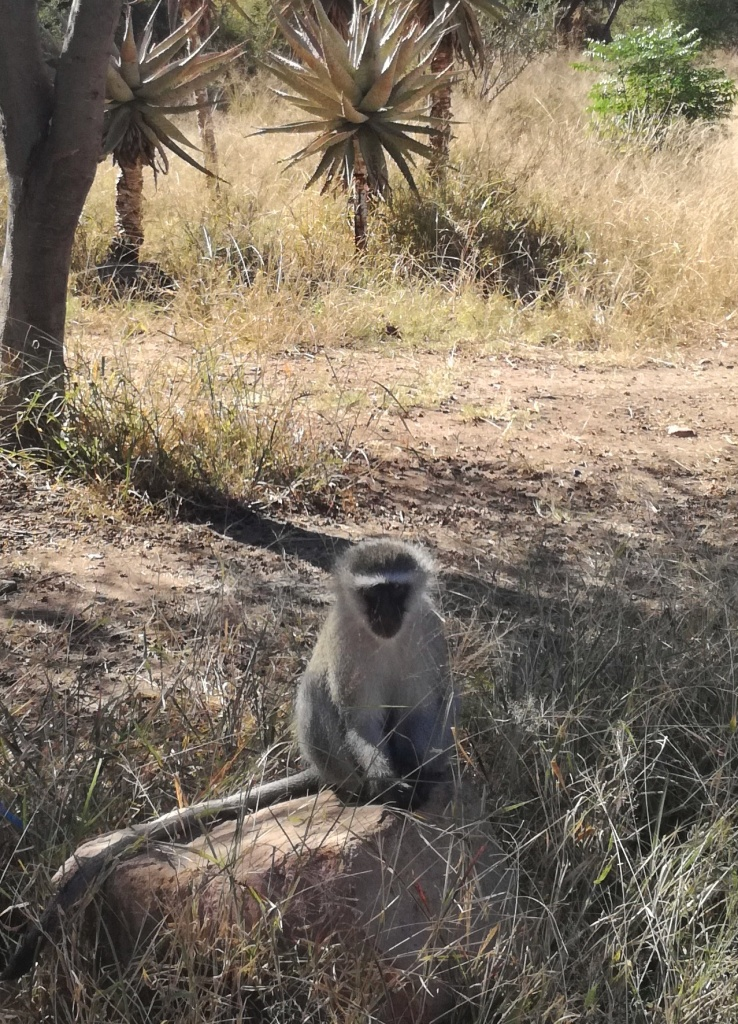
