= Bamalete Lutheran Hospital =

Hospital in Botswana

- Location in Botswana

Geography
- Location: Ramotswa, South-East District, Botswana
- Coordinates: 25°13′S 25°40′E

Organisation
- Type: District
- Affiliated university: None
- Patron: None

Services
- Beds: 134 beds

Helipads
- Helipad: No

Links
- Other links: List of hospitals in Botswana

Bamalete Lutheran Hospital is a Christian health facility located in Ramotswa, a village in South-East District of Botswana, southwest of the capital of Gaborone. The hospital serves the public and has a total of 134 beds in different wards.

== History ==
Located in Ramotswa, south west of Gaborone, Bamalete Lutheran Hospital was founded and originally funded by German Lutheran missionaries in 1934, although more recent funding has come from the government of Botswana. Charitable organisations such as Rotary club also give funding to the hospital. The country does not include any medical training centres, so all doctors are from other countries. Since 2013, hospital contains a hospice run predominantly by nursing staff.

== Bamalete Lutheran School of Nursing ==
The Bamalete Lutheran School of Nursing was unofficially established in 1934 by Sister Emma Pfitzinger from Germany on behalf of the Lutheran Mission. Due to a lack of nursing staff, she began informal teaching of women in the local villages, who became known as "Nurse Aides". This later became a more formal style of teaching, with regular evening classes, English lessons and a nursing syllabus. By 1975, the government gave its support and officially recognised the school and provided a nursing syllabus. The school was closed for some time due to lack of staff and aged buildings, however, by August 1996, they had secured an affiliation with the University of Botswana and were able to fully reopen once again. In 2017, an expansion project began, to provide capacity for more students in specialist areas of nursing.
