= Deborah Retief =

Afrikaner missionary in Bechuanaland (1853–1931)

Deborah Retief (1853–1931), known as Borrie Retief, was an Afrikaner missionary in Bechuanaland (currently Botswana). She was the longest-serving member of the Dutch Reformed Church mission station at Mochudi, where she was based from 1887 to 1930.

== Life ==
Deborah Retief was born on 10 July 1853 in Paarl, one of twelve children. Educated at the Huguenot Seminary in Wellington, she worked for a while as matron in a girls' boarding school before being appointed as a missionary in Mochudi in 1887. There she worked alongside a German clergyman, the Rev. Emil Bernhard Beyer, his wife Anna, and another missionary worker Mary Murray.

In 1892 Chief Lentswe of the Bakgatla people converted to Christianity. In the following year a smallpox epidemic broke out, through which Retief stayed with the Bakgatla. With the assistance of the chief's brother she bought a house from a local shopkeeper, and over the next few decades outlived several missionary clergy at the station. She left Mochudi only in 1930, and died in April 1931 after a few months at a Cape Town nursing home.

The district hospital in Mochudi, the Deborah Retief Memorial Hospital, is named in her honour.
