= Health in Botswana =

Botswana's healthcare system has been steadily improving and expanding its infrastructure to become more accessible. The country's position as an upper middle-income country has allowed them to make strides in universal healthcare access for much of Botswana's population. The majority of the Botswana's 2.3 million inhabitants now live within five kilometres of a healthcare facility. As a result, the infant mortality and maternal mortality rates have been on a steady decline. The country's improving healthcare infrastructure has also been reflected in an increase of the average life expectancy from birth, with nearly all births occurring in healthcare facilities.

Access to healthcare has not alleviated all of the country's healthcare concerns because, like many countries in Sub-Saharan Africa, Botswana is still battling high rates of HIV/AIDS and other infectious diseases. In 2013, about 25% of the population was infected with HIV/AIDS. Botswana is also grappling with high rates of malnutrition among children under the age of 5 which has led to other health concerns such as diarrhea and stunted growth.

== Healthcare system ==
Botswana provides universal healthcare to all citizens through a public healthcare system, but privately run healthcare is also available. The government operates 98% of all medical facilities. Healthcare in Botswana is delivered through a decentralised model with primary healthcare being the pillar of the delivery system. Botswana has an extensive network of health facilities (hospitals, clinics, health posts, mobile stops) in the 27 health districts. In addition to an extensive network of 104 clinics with beds, 195 clinics without beds, 338 health posts and 844 mobile stops primary health care (PHC) services in Botswana are integrated within overall hospital services, being provided in the outpatient sections of all levels of hospitals. It is through these structures that a complement of preventive, promotive and rehabilitative health services as well as treatment and care of common problems are provided.

For a general check-up, citizens are charged 5 pula, unless they are under five or over 65, in which case check-ups are free. The network of public hospitals is organized between primary hospitals, which function as general hospitals and equipped to deal with most diseases and immediate threats to health, district hospitals, which have more beds and are equipped to deal with more serious medical issues, and referral hospitals, which are highly advanced facilities equipped to deal with specialized problems. There are also two private hospitals in the country. The government pays for the treatment of patients referred abroad for medical procedures.

== Healthcare infrastructure ==
=== Expenditure on health ===
Botswana's total expenditure on health is 5.4% of their GDP or $871 per person. Over the last five years, UNICEF estimates that the government has allocated 11% of their total budget on healthcare. In a 2016 health financing profile by the Health Policy Project found that Botswana's government funded 57% of the country's total healthcare expenditure. The vast majority of that funding came from mineral resource revenue which meant the government did not have to earmark any tax dollars for healthcare funding. 39% of the country's healthcare funding came from companies and individuals, with donors only accounting for 7%. Historically, a lot of Botswana's healthcare funding came from donors as part of an international effort to combat the spread of HIV/AIDS in Africa. In recent years, these donations have decreased as the international effort to combat HIV/AIDS has slowed and Botswana has increased its internal revenue. The President's Emergency Plan For AIDS Relief (PEPFAR) has decreased its funding from $90 million in 2010 to $40 million in 2015. In 2016, funding was decreased again to $35 million with a set goal of continuing to decrease funding by $10 million per year.

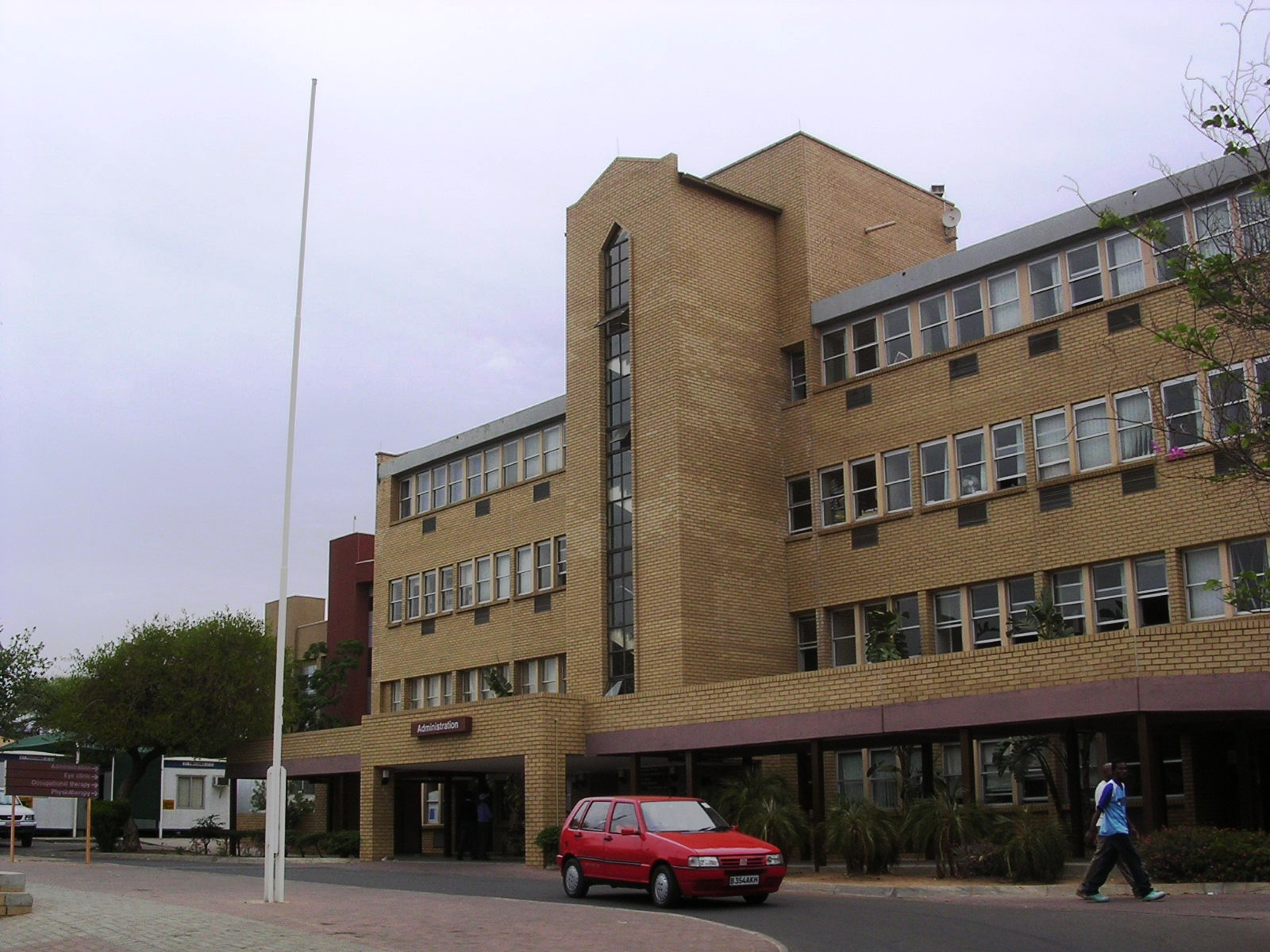
The Princess Marina Hospital

== Staffing ==
Botswana's physician density in 2016 was 0.37 per 1,000 people.

=== Online databases of healthcare providers ===
- The Botswana Health Professions Council does not have an online register of healthcare providers.
- Medpages: Healthcare providers by category and region. Search allows finding of providers by name or specialty.

== Hospitals ==
Botswana has 26 hospitals spread across the country that are part of a three tiered system overseen by the Ministry of Health. The first tier has 16 hospitals located in rural areas that each serve a maximum of 10,000 people. Each hospital has between 20 and 70 beds. The second tier is made up of seven district hospitals located in larger villages and cities. They have between 71 and 250 beds. The third tier has three referral based hospitals that are specialized. Botswana's hospital bed density in 2010 was 1.8 beds per 1000 people.

== Health status ==
=== Life expectancy ===
In 2018, life expectancy at birth in Botswana was 64 for men and 68 for women. The probability of dying under the age of five is 36 per 1,000 live births. According to UNICEF, the high amount of hospital births and the high rate of death among young children points to a lack of quality of care for mothers and newborns once they leave the hospital. The probability of dying between 15 and 60 years was 294 per 1,000 people for men and 208 per 1,000 people for women.

=== Birth rate ===
Botswana's birth rate was 20.9 births per 1,000 people in 2020, giving them the 72nd highest birth rate in the world.

=== Maternal and child health ===
In 2012 0.5 million (26%) of Botswana's estimated 2 million population were women of reproductive age; thus the total fertility rate was 2.6 in 2012. The maternal mortality ratio (MMR) (maternal deaths per 100,000 live births) in Botswana was 129 in 2015; this is compared to almost double in 1990, when the MMR was 243. Between 1990 and 2015 there was a 47% decrease in maternal mortality, this is below the 75% reduction target of MDG 5.

In 2015, Botswana ranked 55 out of 193 in the world in child mortality rate; there was an average of 44 deaths per 1,000 live births (this equates to 2000 children dying under the age of 5). Although high, this was an improvement from 1990 – when the child mortality rate was 54. UNICEF's most recent data states that Botswana's under-five mortality rate is now down to 36.5. Although Botswana's child mortality is relatively high, it is lower than most countries in Africa, which suggests that child well-being is higher in Botswana than in the majority of the continent. Botswana is an upper middle income country with a small population.

The infant mortality rate (IMR) in Botswana has also reduced over the last 15 years; in 1990 the infant mortality rate was 42, and this has since decreased to 35 in 2015. A 2020 estimate from the CIA World Factbook found that Botswana's total IMR was 26.8 deaths per 1,000 live births. The gender break down has the male IMR at 29.2 deaths per 1,000 live births and the female IMR at 24.2 deaths per 1,000 live births. Botswana has the 66th highest IMR in the world according to the CIA World Factbook.

=== Contraception ===
According to UNFPA, 52.8% of women were using modern contraceptives in 2016.

== Prevalent health issues ==
=== Diarrhoea among under-5s ===
Diarrhoea is defined as the passage of three or more loose or liquid stools per day (or more frequent passage than is normal for the individual). Individuals who are diagnosed with diarrhea would suffer from loose or watery stools at least three times a day or more frequently than normal compared with unaffected people. At present, diarrhea remains one of the leading causes of the mortality and morbidity globally, besides, it is identified as the second leading sources of mortality except for pneumonia in under-5s, leading to more deaths than HIV, measles and malaria integrated together in this age group. It is further estimated by the World Health Organization (WHO) that approximately nine million children under the same age category die each year, among which four million cases are caused by diarrhea and 2.2 million are diarrhea-related, with the majority of young children coming from developing countries.

The global influence of diarrhea is particularly serious in sub-Saharan Africa, largely due to the high HIV pandemic. The prevention of diarrhea in this continent has become a public health challenge since its multiple sources of determinants, such as the insecurity of breastfeeding from HIV positive mothers, the unpredictability of climate changes and unqualified public hygiene preparation, thus highlighting the importance of understanding the nature of the disease and relevant strategies to address the issue.

Studies reveal that between 2006 and 2011, there are 171,280 cases of diarrhea in Botswana and they led to 1820 deaths among children under 5 years old. This result is massive since the whole population in this country is only a little over 2,000,000 and it has one of the highest HIV prevalence in the world with an estimated national prevalence of 17.6% in 2008. The situation has put the effected individuals under a vulnerable status to infectious disease and diarrhea disease in particular.

=== HIV/AIDS ===
20.3% of Botswana's adult population, ages 15 to 49, have HIV/AIDS. This is down from 25% of the population in 2013. Botswana has the fourth highest HIV prevalence in the world, after South Africa, Lesotho, and Eswatini.

In 2018, Botswana had 8,500 new cases and 4,800 deaths from HIV/AIDS, down from the country's peak of 18,000 deaths in 2002.

=== Universal free antiretroviral treatment ===
Botswana was the first country in sub-Saharan Africa to provide universal free antiretroviral treatment to people that had tested positive for HIV/AIDS. As a result, in 2018, 85% of adults and 38% of children living with HIV/AIDS were on antiretroviral treatment.

=== Inequalities for women ===
Women have consistently been more impacted by HIV/AIDS in Botswana. In 2016, the HIV/AIDS prevalence rate for adult women was 26.3%. In contrast, the HIV/AIDS prevalence for men of the same age was 17.6%.

Exposure to early sexual debuts, forced marriages and gender-based violence has made women in Botswana more vulnerable to HIV/AIDS. Botswana's government has tried to address these inequalities through increased social services for young women, investment in female economic empowerment and more effective HIV prevention programmes for girls.

=== HIV/AIDS estimates in 2018 ===
- Adults and children living with HIV: 370,000 [330,000 - 400,000]
- Adults aged 15 to 49 HIV prevalence rate: 20.3 [17.3 - 21.8]
- Adults aged 15 and over living with HIV: 350,000 [320,000 - 380,000]
- Women aged 15 and over living with HIV: 200,000 [180,000 - 220,000]
- Men aged 15 and over living with HIV: 150,000 [140,000 - 170,000]
- Children aged 0 to 14 living with HIV: 14,000 [10,000 - 17,000]
- Deaths due to AIDS: 4,800 [4100 - 5,700]
- Orphans due to AIDS aged 0 to 17: 65,000 [56,000 - 77,000]

=== Malaria ===
There is a high risk of malaria in the northern half of Botswana, including the Okavango Delta, from November to June. In 2013 there were 456 confirmed malaria cases reported; there were seven deaths from confirmed and probable cases of malaria.

=== Malnutrition ===
In 2007, 11.2% of children under the age of 5 in Botswana were considered malnourished, up from 10.1% in 2000. As a result of malnourishment, 31.4% children under the age of 5 are stunted.

UNICEF estimates that only 1 in 5 babies are exclusively breastfed in their first 6 months and only 46% of children are given food as well as being breastfed at 6–9 months. These factors contribute to high rates of stunted growth and to Botswana's high rate of deaths among children under the age of 5.

In 2016 18.9% of Botswana's population was obese giving them the 114th highest rate of obesity in the world.

=== Tuberculosis ===
In 1990, the tuberculosis mortality rate was 97 deaths per 100,000 people. In 2015 the tuberculosis mortality rate was reduced by 76% to 22 deaths per 100,000; this means that Botswana achieved one of the targets for the 6th Millennium Development Goal.

=== Coronavirus pandemic (COVID-19) ===
Botswana had its first three confirmed cases of COVID-19 on 30 March 2020 and one confirmed death from COVID-19 on 31 March 2020. In response to the spread of COVID-19, Botswana closed their borders to everyone except Botswana residents. Botswana residents returning to Botswana from high risk countries are required to enter a government mandated 14-day quarantine at government approved locations.[

The government declared a state of emergency starting April 3, 2020, until further notice. President Masisi called for a six-month state of emergency while the country battles the COVID-19 outbreak. On 8 April 2020, cabinet members and members of Botswana's parliament were exposed to a COVID-19 infected health care worker who was screening them for COVID-19. As a result, all lawmakers, including President Masisi, went into quarantine.

On 8 May 2020 the government began to ease social distancing restrictions.

== Criticisms ==
Although Botswana has a relatively high healthcare worker density for the region, they are mostly concentrated in urban areas. The country is also grappling with a high rate of vacancies in health worker positions in multiple regions of the country. Botswana has been unable to retain internationally trained health workers which has contributed to the high rate of vacancies. Associated with this problem is their dependence on migrant health workers and out-of-country training programs.

A 2014 study on Botswana's human resources for health, stated that the country must begin to attract and retain migrant health workers while also fostering domestic training programs. To avoid inequities in health services, the government must also distribute the workforce in a way that will fill vacancies. A 2016 study found that there was a direct correlation between doctor and nurse density, and the mortality rate and loss-to-follow-up (LTFU) on individual patients. They found that increasing the doctor density from one to two doctors per 10,000 people decreased the predicted probability of death by 27%. Their proposed temporary solution is to redistribute healthcare workers equitably throughout the country, which would bring down the mortality rate and LTFU, while the government addressed their difficulty in retaining migrant healthcare workers and improve their domestic training programs.

== See also ==
- HIV/AIDS in Botswana
- List of hospitals in Botswana
- COVID-19 pandemic in Botswana
- World Health Organization
