= Deborah Retief Memorial Hospital =

Hospital in Mochudi, Kgatleng, Botswana

- Botswana Ministry of Health
- Location in Botswana

Geography
- Location: Mochudi, Kgatleng, Botswana
- Coordinates: 24°25′S 26°09′E

Organisation
- Type: District
- Affiliated university: None
- Patron: None

Helipads
- Helipad: No

History
- Founded: September 1932

Links
- Other links: List of hospitals in Botswana

Deborah Retief Memorial Hospital is a government-run district hospital located in Mochudi, one of the larger villages in Botswana with a population of 44,815 people in 2011. It is situated in the Bakgatla tribal region, in Kgatleng District, about 37 km (23 mi) northeast of Gaborone. The village lies several kilometres from the main Gaborone–Francistown road, and can be accessed through a short turn at Pilane. Botswana. The hospital was established in September 1932. It is named in memory of the missionary Deborah Retief.
