= Mahalapye District Hospital =

Hospital in Botswana

- Botswana Ministry of Health
- Location in Botswana

Geography
- Location: Mahalapye, Botswana
- Coordinates: 23°06′S 26°48′E

Organisation
- Type: Central District
- Affiliated university: None
- Patron: None

Helipads
- Helipad: No

History
- Founded: 2008

Links
- Other links: List of hospitals in Botswana

Mahalapye District Hospital is a government-run district hospital located in Mahalapye, a town located in the Central District of Botswana. The town has about 41,000 inhabitants and is situated along the main road between the capital Gaborone and the second largest city Francistown.

== History ==
Mahalapye hospital was founded in 2008 by the government with the aim of bringing health care services closer to the community. It is located in the central district of Botswana on the Francistown- Gaborone road side.
