= Palapye Primary Hospital =

Hospital in Botswana

- Botswana Ministry of Health
- Location in Botswana

Geography
- Location: Palapye, Botswana
- Coordinates: 22°33′S 27°08′E

Organisation
- Type: Central District
- Affiliated university: None
- Patron: None

Helipads
- Helipad: No

Links
- Other links: List of hospitals in Botswana

Palapye Primary Hospital is a government-run district hospital located in Palapye, Botswana.
