= Sekgoma Memorial Hospital =

Hospital in Botswana

- Botswana Ministry of Health
- Location in Botswana

Geography
- Location: Serowe, Central District (Botswana), Botswana
- Coordinates: 22°23′S 26°43′E

Organisation
- Type: District
- Affiliated university: None
- Patron: None

Helipads
- Helipad: No

History
- Founded: 1928

Links
- Other links: List of hospitals in Botswana

Sekgoma Memorial Hospital is a government-run district hospital located in Serowe, a town in Botswana's Central District. A trade and commercial centre, it is Botswana's largest village rich with the history of Botswana.

== History ==
The hospital was established in 1938. It is situated along the Palapye-Serowe road.

The hospital was totally rebuilt by Murray and Roberts (now known as Concor) in 2005.
