= Selibi Phikwe Government Hospital =

Hospital in Botswana

- Botswana Ministry of Health
- Location in Botswana

Geography
- Location: Selebi Phikwe, Botswana
- Coordinates: 21°58′33″S 27°50′24″E

Organisation
- Type: Central District
- Affiliated university: None
- Patron: None

Services
- Beds: 120

History
- Founded: 1970

Links
- Other links: List of hospitals in Botswana

Selibi Phikwe Government Hospital is a government-run district hospital located in Selebi Phikwe, is a mining town located in the Central District of Botswana. It had a population of 49,849 in 2001 which is now estimated to have risen to c.52000.

== History ==
Selibi Phikwe Government Hospital is a Government health institution founded in 1970. The institution is located at the central district of Botswana in a town called Selebi Phikwe. Selebi Phikwe Government Hospital has increased its bed capacity from 65 to 120. This expansion project, which was reported by the Daily News, had a budget of P40 million.
