= Princess Marina Hospital =

Hospital in Gaborone, South-East District, Botswana

- Botswana Ministry of Health
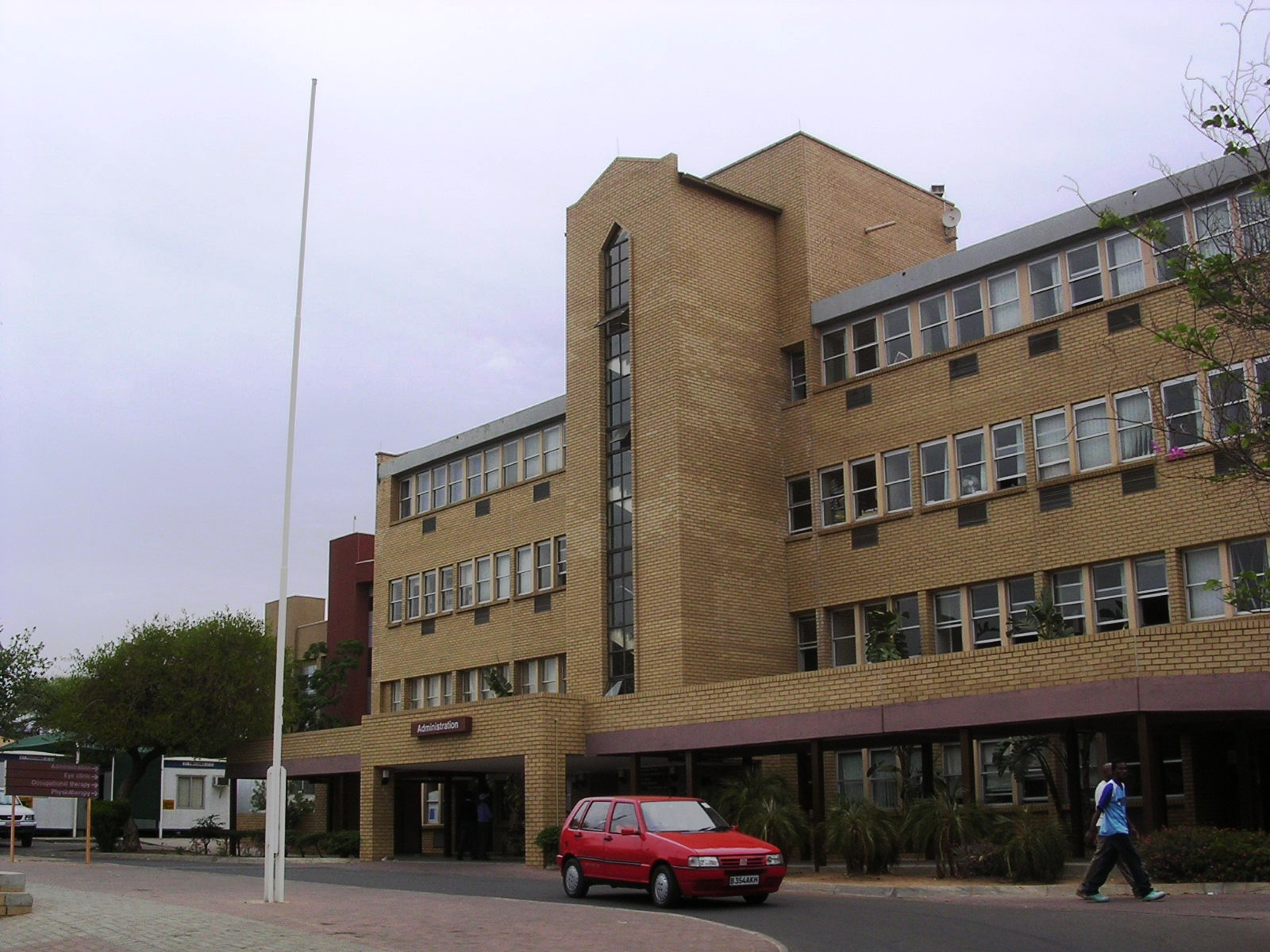
- Side view of Princess Marina hospital in Capital Gaborone

- Location in Botswana

Geography
- Location: Gaborone, South-East District, Botswana
- Coordinates: 24°39′29″S 25°54′44″E

Organisation
- Care system: Public
- Type: District General
- Affiliated university: None
- Patron: None

Services
- Emergency department: Yes 24 Hours
- Beds: 530

Helipads
- Helipad: No

History
- Founded: September 30, 1966; 59 years ago

Links
- Other links: List of hospitals in Botswana

Princess Marina Hospital (PMH) is a provincial, government-funded district general hospital in Botswana. As of March 2018, PMH is the largest referral hospital in Botswana, with 530 in-patient beds. It is named after Princess Marina.

== Location ==
Princess Marina Hospital is located in the capital city of Gaborone, at the corner of North Ring Road and Notwane Road. One block west of Marina Hospital lies the National Museum of Botswana, and two blocks to the east of the hospital, is the Botswana National Stadium. The geo-graphical coordinates of the hospital are: 24°39'25.0"S, 25°55'26.0"E (Latitude:-24.656944; Longitude:25.923889).

== History ==
Princess Marina Hospital was built to mark the independence of Botswana (formerly Bechuanaland) from the British, on 30 September 1966. The buildings were officially commissioned by her Royal Highness, the Duchess of Kent Princess Marina and the hospital was named after her.

== Facilities ==
Princess Marina Hospital has about 530 beds. Facilities include:

- dialysis unit, for the diagnosis and treatment of kidney diseases;
- medical laboratory, for the diagnosis of various infections and diseases
- blood bank for the storage and preservation of donated blood
- physiotherapy unit that provides comprehensive service to hospital inpatients;
- radiotherapy unit; and
- a pathology laboratory.

Other facilities include a psychiatry unit; a CT scanner; an angiography unit; facilities for prostate screening; an Intensive Care Unit (ICU); and radiotherapy equipment.
