= Goabaone Taylor =

Botswana Sports Administrator

- Education: University of Botswana; Stellenbosch University; Botswana Accountancy College; University of Cape Town (UCT)
- Occupations: Commercial Executive, sports administrator
- Spouse: Paul Treston Taylor (until death in 2021)

Goabaone Taylor (sometimes referred to as Goabaone G.Taylor) is a Motswana commercial executive and sports administrator who served as the chief executive officer of Botswana Football Association between April and December 2021. She occupied this position with effect from 1 April 2021, making her the first female to occupy this position since the inception of the organisation in 1966.

== Background and education ==
In 2002, Taylor graduated from the University of Botswana(UB) with a bachelor's degree of business administration with a major in marketing. In May 2015, she was a graduate of the Senior Management Development Program from Stellenbosch University. She also has a number of professional licenses and certifications such as Enterprise Risk Management from the Botswana Accountancy College (BAC) in May 2016 and Digital marketing from the University of Cape Town (UCT) in December of the same year.

== Career ==
Taylor worked as an account manager in the International Business Unit of Botswana Telecommunications Corporation (BTC) and held a few jobs in-between prior to being appointed country manager of Econet Media Botswana heading Kwese TV in 2017.

In April 2021, Taylor was appointed as chief executive officer of Botswana Football Association for a three-year tenure. She was suspended from the same position in December 2021 following allegations of "irregular utilization of BFA funds".

== Personal life ==
Taylor was married to Paul Treston Taylor, a former managing director of the Botswana Telecommunications Corporation Limited (BTCL), who died in December 2021

== See also ==
- Botswana national football team
