= Masunga Primary Hospital =

Hospital in Botswana

- Botswana Ministry of Health
- Location in Botswana

Geography
- Location: Masunga, North-East District, Botswana
- Coordinates: 20°40′S 27°25′E

Organisation
- Type: Primary
- Affiliated university: None
- Patron: None

Helipads
- Helipad: No

Links
- Lists: Hospitals in Botswana
- Other links: List of hospitals in Botswana

Masunga Primary Hospital is a government-run district hospital located in Masunga, Botswana.
