= Maun General Hospital =

Hospital in Botswana

- Botswana Ministry of Health
- Location in Botswana

Geography
- Location: Maun, Central District (Botswana), Botswana
- Coordinates: 19°59′S 023°25′E

Organisation
- Type: District
- Affiliated university: None
- Patron: None

Services
- Beds: 350

Helipads
- Helipad: No

Links
- Other links: List of hospitals in Botswana

Maun General Hospital is a government-run district hospital located in Maun, the fifth largest town in Botswana. As of 2011, it had a population of 55,784. Maun is the "tourism capital" of Botswana and the administrative centre of Ngamiland district.

Located 10km from Letsholathebe II Memorial Hospital, Maun General Hospital refurbishment plans began in July 2017 with a completion deadline of 2018. However, due to failure of the contractor to meet set deadlines, it will now be completed in 2026/2027 financial year at a budget of 27 million pula.
