= Sbrana Psychiatric Hospital =

Hospital in Botswana

- Botswana Ministry of Health

Geography
- Location: South-East District, Lobatse, Botswana
- Coordinates: 25°13′S 25°40′E

Organisation
- Care system: Public
- Type: Psychiatric
- Affiliated university: Institute of health Sciences (IHS)

Services
- Emergency department: 24 Hours
- Beds: 300

History
- Opened: 2010

Links
- Other links: List of hospitals in Botswana

Sbrana Psychiatric Hospital is a public psychiatric hospital in Lobatse, Botswana. It is situated to the north of the mall and was built on the site of the Botswana Prisons. Sbrana works as a referral hospital to cater for everyone around Botswana.

== History ==
Sbrana psychiatric hospital is a national referral health institution that serves the community of Botswana. It was established in 2010 after being converted from Lobatse mental clinic to a psychiatric hospital. Sbrana is affiliated to the Health sciences institution in Botswana, it provides teaching services to medical students as part of their job training and internships. The hospital has facilities which includes the football field, the gymnasium, tennis court and soft ball courts.

== Services ==
Sbrana Psychiatric hospital specializes in the treatment of serious mental illness, such as clinical depression, schizophrenia, and bipolar disorder.

=== Departments ===
- Biophysics
- Neuroimaging and Interventional Radiology
- Neurology
- Neuromicrobiology
- Neuropathology
- Neurophysiology
- Neurosurgery
- Neurovirology
- Nursing
- Neurological Rehabilitation
- Psychiatric Social Work
- Psychiatry
- Psychopharmacology
- Biomedical Engineering
- Psychiatric rehabilitation
- Speech Pathology & Audiology
