= Siyanda Mohutsiwa =

Motswana writer

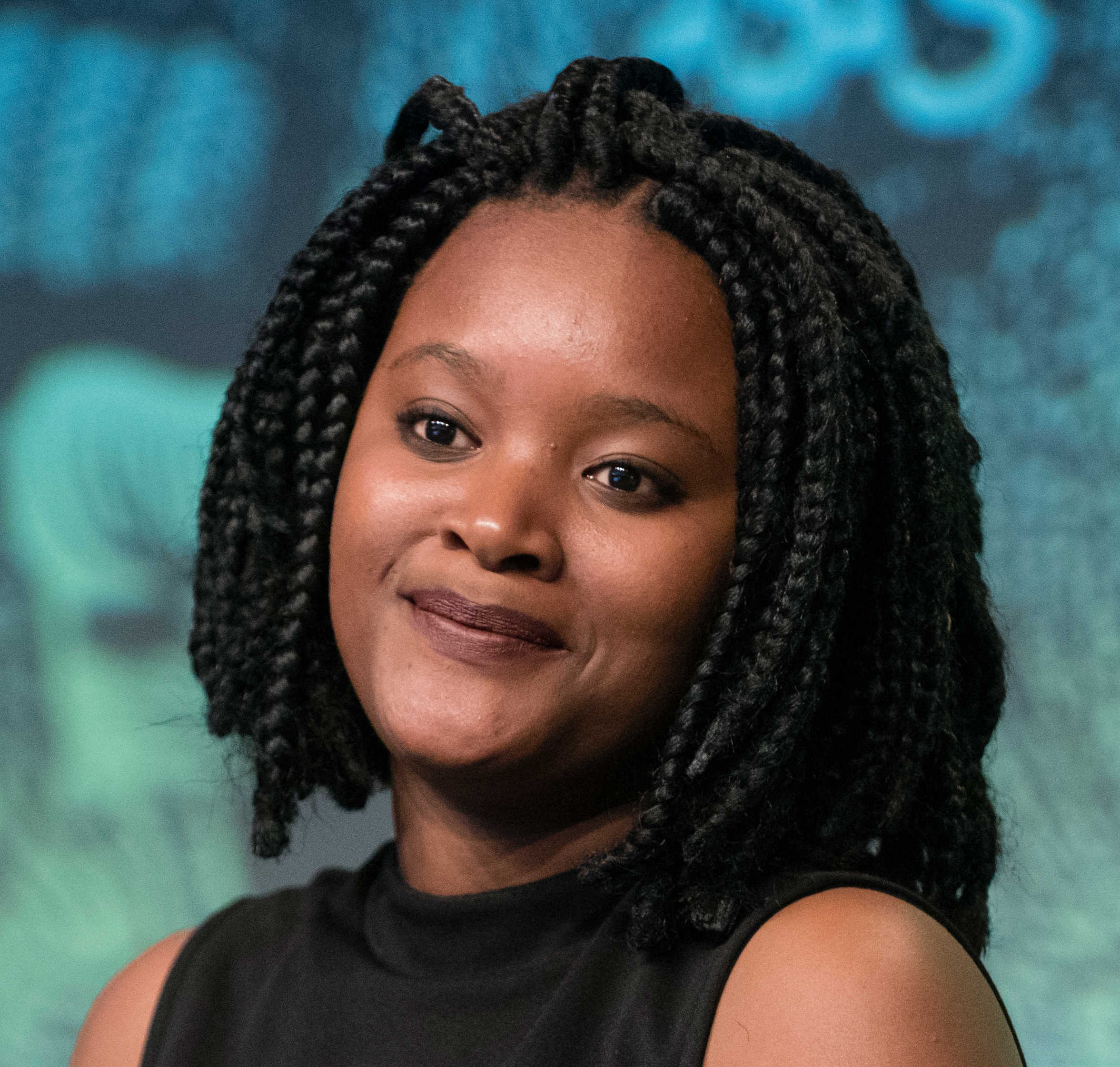
- Siyanda Mohutsiwa in 2016
- Born: Siyanda Mohutsiwa; 1993 (age 32–33); Swaziland
- Occupations: Writer and Speaker

Siyanda Mohutsiwa (born 1993) is an internationally recognised satirical writer and speaker from Botswana. She created the satirical hashtag #IfAfricaWasABar that went viral in the summer of 2015. She describes herself as a pan-Africanist.

She delivered a TED talk titled "Is Africa's Future Online?" in November 2015, and another titled "How young Africans found a voice on Twitter" in February 2016.

== Early life ==
Katlo Siyanda Mohutsiwa was born in 1993 in Swaziland, where her mother is from and moved to Botswana, where her father is from when she was very young. Her initial language was SiSwati, but relocating not only changed her language, but brought her awareness of having lost her Swazi identity and becoming part of the shared history of African identity. When she moved to Botswana, Mohutsiwa lost her ability to speak SiSwati and became a Setswana speaker

== Education ==
Mohutsiwa graduated with a Bachelor of Science degree in mathematics from the University of Botswana in October 2016. Siyanda Mohutsiwa is a graduate of the prestigious Iowa Writers Workshop where she received a MFA from the University of Iowa in 2018. In 2020, she joined the Sociology department at the University of Chicago.

== Writing ==
Mohutsiwa began writing at the age of five and by age twelve was writing an opinion column in a national newspaper. By the age of sixteen, she was writing a blog focusing on issues such as black consciousness, economics and development, feminism, and pan-Africanism. The blog was picked up by several international radio stations, including the BBC. In 2013, Mohutsiwa was an invited to contribute to the blog for Zanews, an international commentary site out of South Africa. She is also a contributor to the Mail & Guardian, Siyanda Mohutsiwa has been a dominant voice in social media writing since at least 2014. as well as being a UNICEF Special Youth Reporter, writing about youth employment, HIV, peer pressure and other topics. As a part of her work in reporting on youth issues, Mohutsiwa has participated as a featured speaker in conferences, such as the 21st International AIDS Conference held in Durban, South Africa. However, most of her writing takes place on Twitter, where she observes social media trends and engages in online community dialogue. In January 2014, she began the satirical hashtag #africannationsinhighschool, which was tagged over 50,000 times.

In 2016, Siyanda moved to America to enroll at the prestigious Iowa Writers Workshop where she studied fiction under Lan Samantha Chang, Ethan Canin, Ayana Mathis, Charles D'Ambrosio and Jess Walter. After receiving her MFA, she went on to work for the International Writing Program as a coordinator for the Summer Institute

=== If Africa Was A Bar ===
On 27 July 2015, Mohutsiwa posted a question from her personal Twitter account: "If Africa was a bar, what would your country be drinking/doing?" The question was quickly transformed into a hashtag as people all over the African continent began tweeting their responses, including the tag #IfAfricaWasABar. The hashtag was used over 61,000 times. When asked what inspired her original post, Mohutsiwa responded "I thought it would be a fun way for Africans to laugh at themselves and each other by putting geopolitics in a comedic light."

The discussion turned to another on-line media platform, TedTalks, when Mohutsiwa was invited to discuss how social media is being used to transform social conversation. She discussed that the internet has changed the way people deal with issues, their ability to criticize stereotypes, their governments, policies, and identity. Leading to a broader platform and recognition, she has discussed how social media has driven culture on her Twitter feed, which has been re-quoted as relevant commentary by mainstream international media such as The Independent, BuzzFeed, Variety and others.
