= University of Botswana =

Public university in Botswana

Coordinates: 24°40′S 025°56′E

- Motto: Thuto Ke Thebe (Setswana)
- Motto in English: Education is a Shield
- Type: Public university
- Established: 1982
- Endowment: P334 million (US$50 million)
- Chancellor: Tebelelo Seretse
- Vice-Chancellor: David Norris
- Administrative staff: 2,658
- Students: 15,484
- Undergraduates: 14,093
- Postgraduates: 1,445
- Location: (Botswana) Gaborone, Francistown, and Maun
- Campus: Urban; 1.15 square kilometres (280 acres)
- Colors: Brown; Blue
- Nickname: Mmadikolo/Basco
- Mascot: Bull (steer)
- Website: www.ub.bw

The University of Botswana (UB) was established in 1982, as the first institution of higher education in Botswana. The university currently has three campuses: one in the capital city Gaborone, one in Francistown, and another in Maun. The University of Botswana is divided into 8 faculties: Business, Education, Engineering, Humanities, Health Sciences, Medicine, Science and Social Sciences and the Sir Ketumile Masire Teaching Hospital. UB is ranked 1201–1500 in the world and 21st in sub-Saharan Africa in the 2024 Times Higher Education World University Ranking.

== History ==
UB began as a part of a larger university system known as UBBS, or the University of Bechuanaland (Botswana), Basotoland (Lesotho), and Swaziland; which was founded in 1964 to reduce the three countries' reliance on tertiary education in apartheid-era South Africa. After Botswana and Lesotho became independent in 1966, the university was called the University of Botswana, Lesotho, and Swaziland (UBLS).

In 1975 Lesotho withdrew from the partnership and established its own national university. For several years a joint University of Botswana and Swaziland existed until in the early 1980s the university was amicably divided into two separate national universities. It was at the time of Lesotho's initial withdrawal that Botswana, which was among the poorest nations in the world, started the One Man, One Beast (motho le motho kgomo) movement. This fundraising campaign formally known as the Botswana University Campus Appeal (BUCA) was spearheaded by the late President Sir Seretse Khama in 1976. The campaign was launched to raise money for the construction of the Botswana Campus of the University of Botswana and Swaziland.

BUCA followed in the wake of unilateral nationalisation of a joint-university campus facility in Roma by the Lesotho government. Batswana (People of Botswana) and other stakeholders made contributions of all types (including cash, cattle, grain, eggs, etc.) towards accomplishing the set target of one million rand. By 1982, the University of Botswana became a reality and remains the oldest institution of higher education in the country. The One Man, One Beast (motho le motho kgomo) movement endures today on the university's main statue located in front of the new library.

== Administration ==
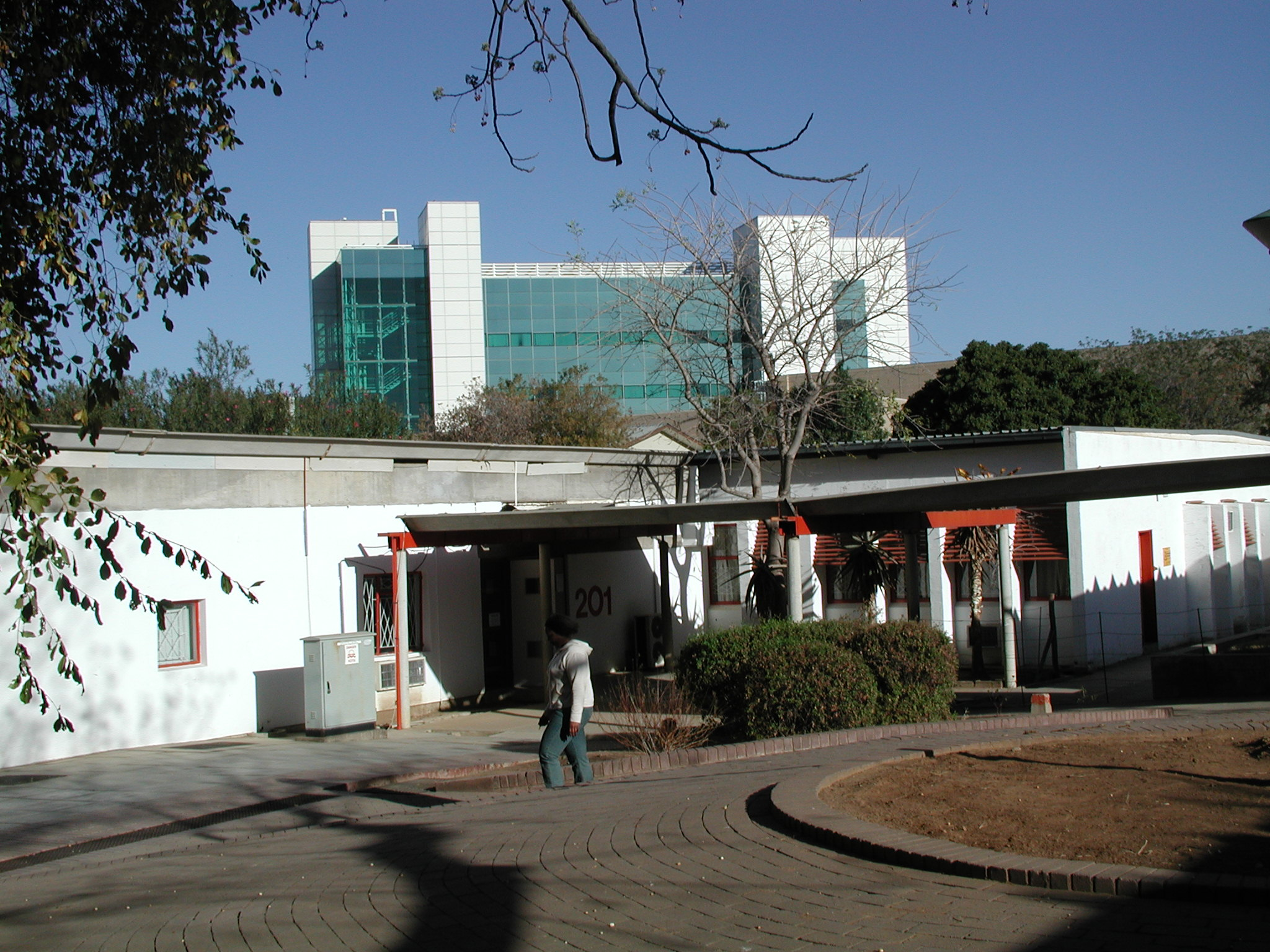
UB Library

The President or Vice President of Botswana serves as the Chancellor of the university. The top administrator on campus is the Vice Chancellor. There have been five Vice Chancellors of the university:

- 1982–1984: John Turner,
- 1984–1998: Thomas Tlou,
- 1998–2003: Sharon Siverts,
- 2003–2011: Bojosi Otlhogile,
- 2011–2017: Thabo Fako.
- 2017–present: Prof. David Norris

== Student life ==
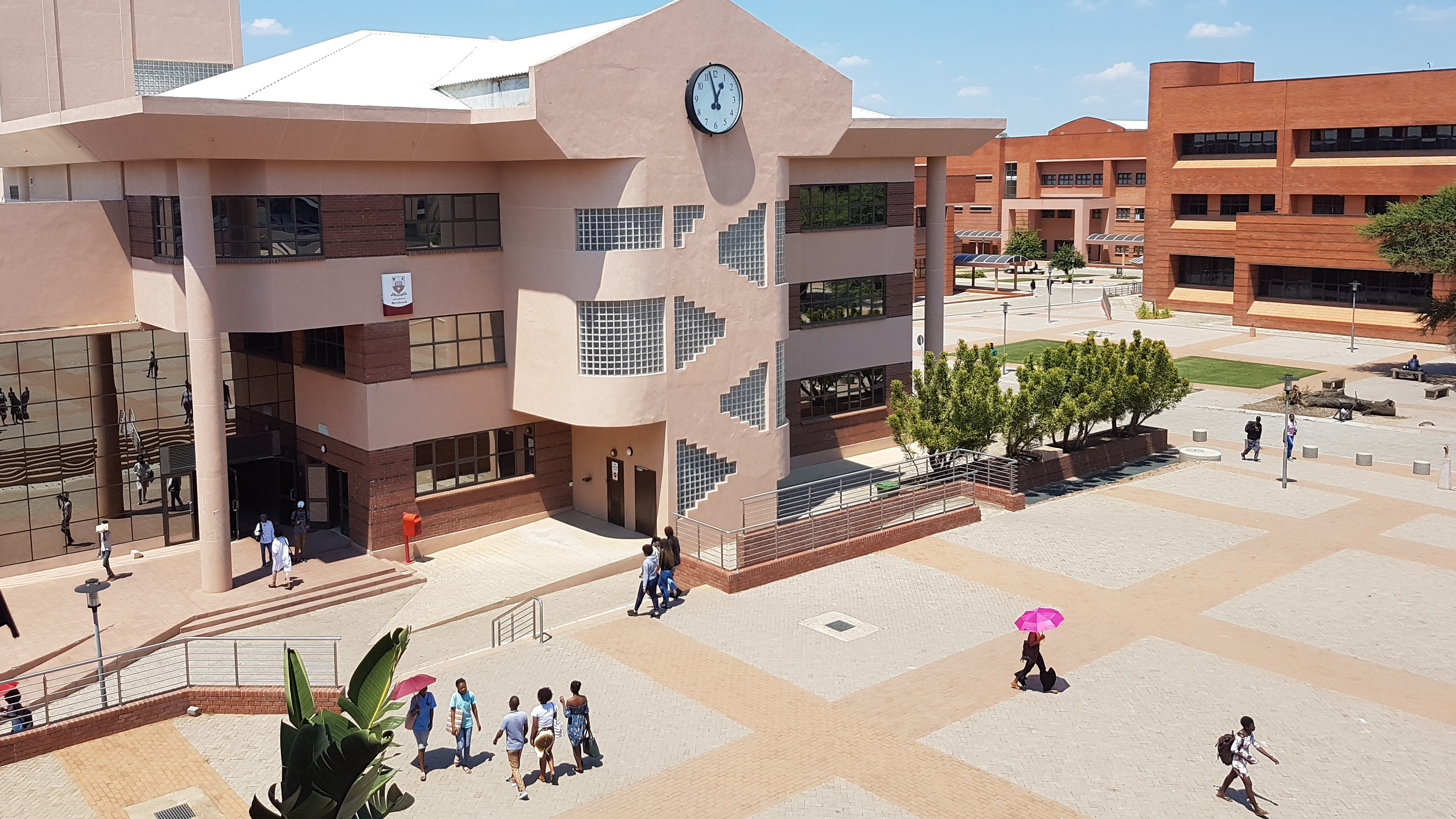
Gaborone, University of Botswana, Central campus

Many students live on campus in residence halls. Students that live in the residence halls are served meals on campus refectories.

Campus amenities include an Olympic-sized swimming pool, an entertainment arena, and sports courts (basketball, tennis, handball, netball and volleyball). The university is adjacent to the National Stadium, which is available for university use. The practice fields outside the stadium are the location for university intramural sports.

The university provides a free medical clinic and counseling services.

== Faculties and Departments ==
=== Faculty of Business ===
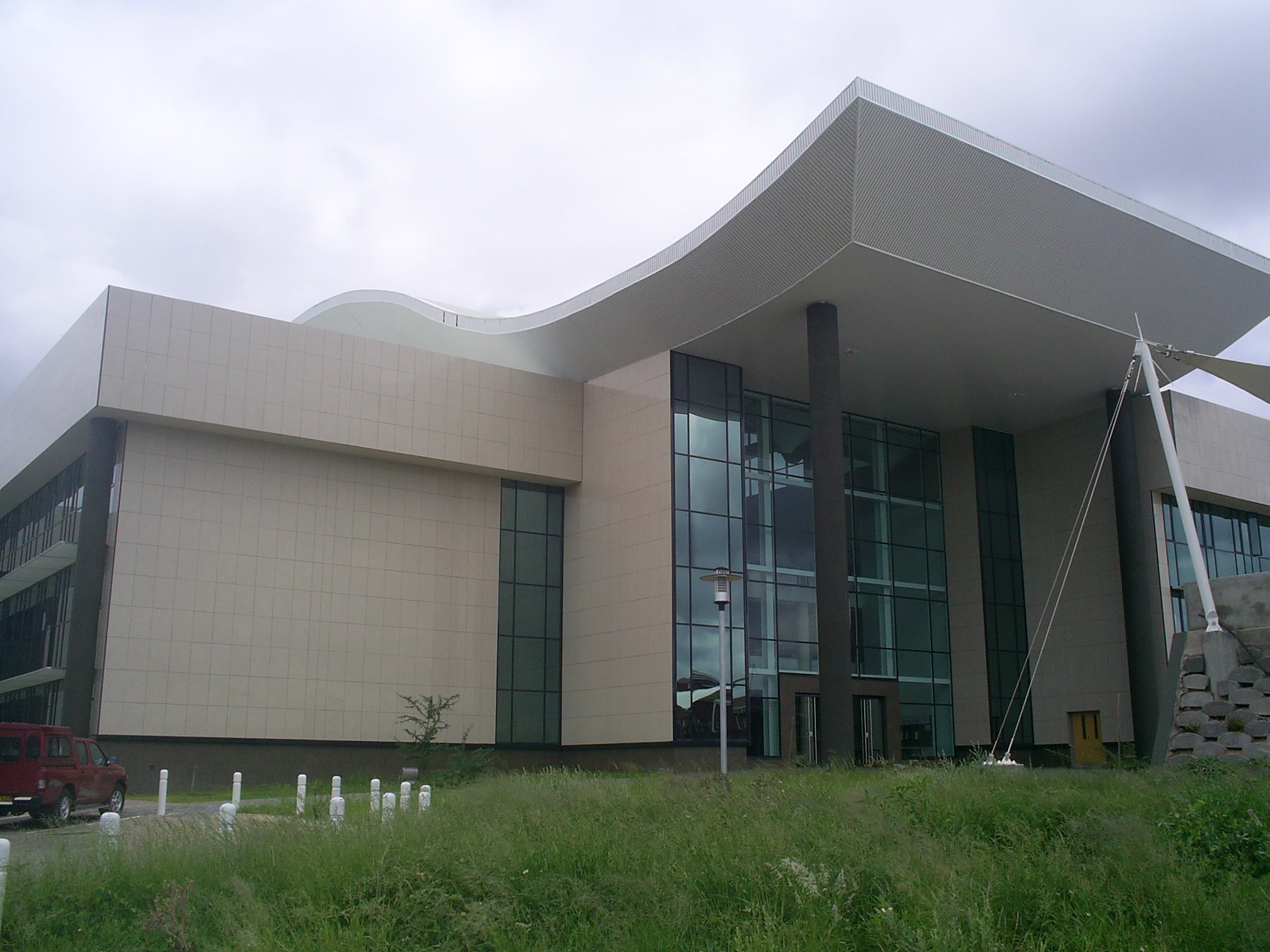
University of Botswana Faculty of Business

The Faculty of Business was established in 1997 following the reorganisation of the School of Accounting and Management Studies under the Faculty of Social Sciences. Under the umbrella of this new faculty, three departments were created to offer specialism in management, marketing, and accounting and finance. The most popular of these is the Bachelor of Accountancy (BAcc) program, which trains students for a professional level accounting certification exams, most notably the ACCA. Many graduates have integrated this degree into tracks such as becoming American CPA's or members of the UK's CIMA. The faculty offers five degrees:

- Bachelor of Accountancy (BAcc)
- Bachelor of Business Administration (BBA) in Management
- Bachelor of Business Administration (BBA) in Marketing
- Bachelor of Information Systems (BIS)
- Bachelor of Finance
- Master of Business Administration (MBA)

=== Faculty of Education ===
This is the oldest faculty in the university. The faculty is composed of eight departments including Lifelong Learning and Community Development, Educational Foundations, Educational Technology, Family and Consumer Sciences, Languages and Social Sciences, Mathematics and Sciences Education, Primary Education and Sports Science. There are fifteen undergraduate programmes: a Master of Education degree with eleven specialisations; a Master of Masters in Lifelong Learning and Community Development program, a Master of Counselling and Human Services programme, two MPhil and PhD programmes and a Post Graduate Diploma in Education.

=== Faculty of Engineering ===
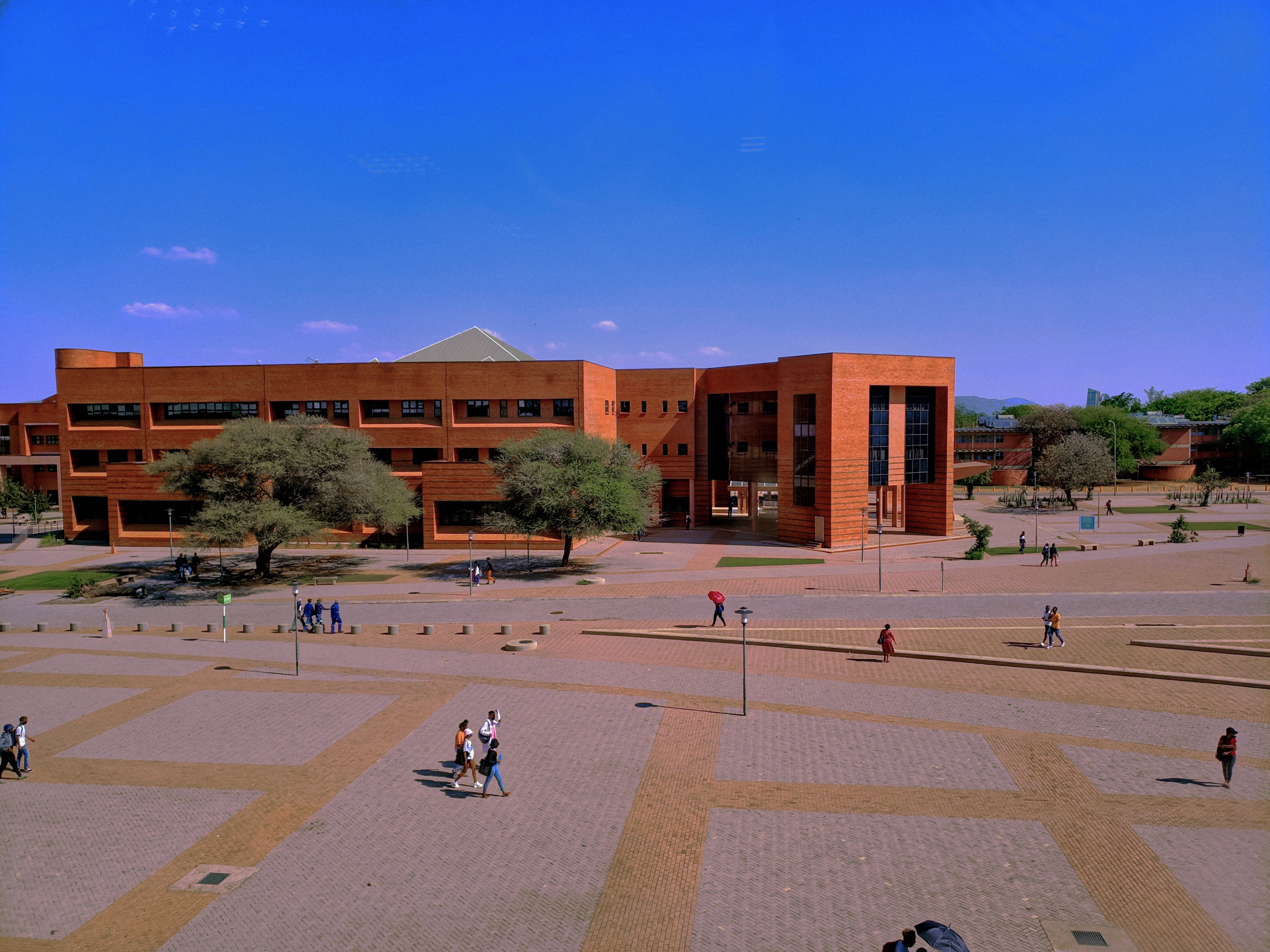
Faculty of Engineering

The Faculty of Engineering and Technology was created in 1996 as a result of Botswana Polytechnic being incorporated into UB. The faculty was located approximately 1.7 kilometres (1.1 mi) from the main UB campus in downtown Gaborone where it is now known as BCET, but it has since been moved to the main campus.

The Faculty provides a wide range of Engineering courses including Mechanical, Civil, Electrical, Mining and Mineral Engineering, Industrial Design and Technology. Other courses such as Architecture, Real Estate, Planning Survey are also offered.

It offers Certificate, Diploma, Bachelors and Masters in areas related to Engineering. and the planning courses which takes five years (four years in Botswana and the last year to complete with masters at professional planning institutions).

=== Faculty of Humanities ===
The Faculty of Humanities has ten departments: African languages and literature; Chinese studies; English; French; History; library and information studies; media studies; Portuguese studies. It runs undergraduate and post-graduate courses. The history department includes the archaeology unit. The Confucius Institute at the University of Botswana was established in 2006 as part of the Faculty of Humanities.

=== Faculty of Science ===
The Faculty of Science, which has the largest annual enrollment, began as the School of Science of UBBS in 1971. Its original four departments (Biology, Chemistry, Mathematics and Physics) were involved only in teaching Part I of the BSc degree programme. In 1975, when the Lesotho campus dissociated from UBBS, the teaching of Part II (years 3 and 4) began in all departments. The departments of environmental science, geology, and computer science were added to the faculty before the University of Botswana came into existence in 1982.

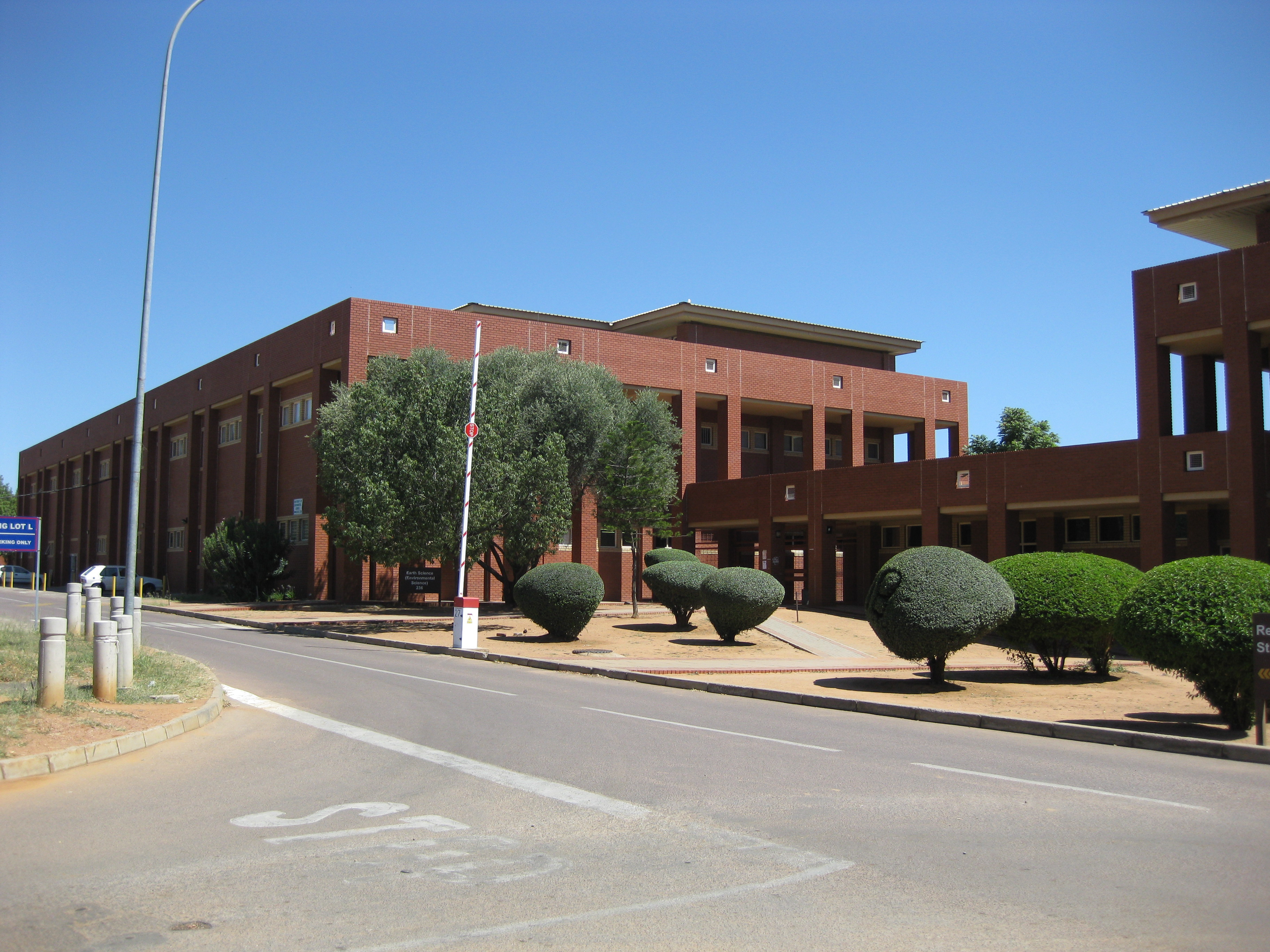
University of Botswana Earth Science

The head of the Environmental Science department, Dr. Segosebe, is also the Chair of Somarelang Tikologo, a local environmental NGO in Gaborone.

=== Faculty of Social Science ===
A number of programmes at the certificate, diploma, degree, and masters levels are offered by the Faculty of Social Sciences. Students admitted into the BA programme are allowed, with the permission of the heads of department, to pursue a combined major in two subjects from departments within the faculty as well as selected departments in other faculties. Degree programmes offered in the faculty include Bachelor of Law, Bachelor of Social Sciences, Bachelor of Social Work, and Master of Public Administration, as well as Bachelor of Arts in Criminal Justice Studies.

=== School of Medicine ===
The Bachelor of Medicine Bachelor of Surgery (MBBS) professional degree is a five-year programme. The first two years follow an integrated Problem Based Learning approach. The last three years are clinically structured providing the opportunity to practice in the hospital and community.

A modern building complex, erected on the main university campus to house the medical school was completed in 2012. A 450-bed academic teaching hospital was completed in 2014. On average, a total of 50 medical undergraduates are admitted to the MBBS programme annually.

== Global Partnerships ==
The University of Botswana maintains numerous global partnerships to facilitate research cooperation and study exchanges. International exchange partners include:

United States

- University of California (University of California Education Abroad Program)
- University of Pennsylvania (Botswana-UPenn Partnership for healthcare improvement)
- University of Texas at Austin
- Georgetown University
- University of Kansas
- Augustana College
- Indiana University
- University of Alabama
- University of Illinois Urbana-Champaign
- University of Minnesota
- Florida State University

Europe

- University College Maastricht at Maastricht University (Netherlands)
- University of Tübingen (Germany)
- Goethe University Frankfurt (Germany)
- University of Potsdam (Germany)
- University of Giessen (Germany)
- University of Bremen (Germany)
- Technical University of Dortmund (Germany)
- University of Koblenz and Landau (Germany)
- Technical University of Kaiserslautern (Germany)
- Catholic University of Eichstätt-Ingolstadt (Germany)

Asia-Pacific

- Kyoto University (Japan)
- Tokyo University of Foreign Studies (Japan)
- Akita University (Japan)
- Ritsumeikan University (Japan)
- Jiangsu University (China)
- Victoria University of Wellington (New Zealand)
- University of Adelaide (Australia)

Africa

- Rhodes University (South Africa)
- Tshwane University of Technology (South Africa)
- University of Zambia (Zambia)

== Notable alumni ==
- Duma Boko - President of the Republic of Botswana
- Seretse Khama Ian Khama - former President of the Republic of Botswana
- Bogolo Kenewendo - Botswana economist and politician, who served as the Cabinet Minister of Investment, Trade and Industry, in the Cabinet of Botswana
- Mokgweetsi Masisi - fifth President of the Republic of Botswana
- Patricia McFadden - Swazi author, Professor of Sociology, and African radical feminist
- Linah Moholo - former Governor of the Bank of Botswana and Chancellor of the University of Botswana
- Siyanda Mohutsiwa - Botswana writer and media personality
- Athaliah Molokomme - first female attorney general of Botswana and women's rights activist
- Sanji Mmasenono Monageng - former vice president of the International Criminal Court (ICC)
- Beatrice Mtetwa - Zimbabwean human rights lawyer
- Naledi Pandor - former South African Minister of International Relations and Cooperation
- Bridgette Radebe - South African businesswoman
- Phandu Skelemani - Speaker of the National Assembly of Botswana and former Minister of Foreign Affairs
- Goabaone Taylor - accountant and sports administrator
- Slumber Tsogwane - 9th Vice President of Botswana
- Ellinah Wamukoya - former Bishop of Swaziland and first female Bishop in Africa

== See also ==
- Botswana Vaccine Institute
