= Botswana National Museum =

Museum in Gaborone, Botswana

- National Museum and Art Gallery
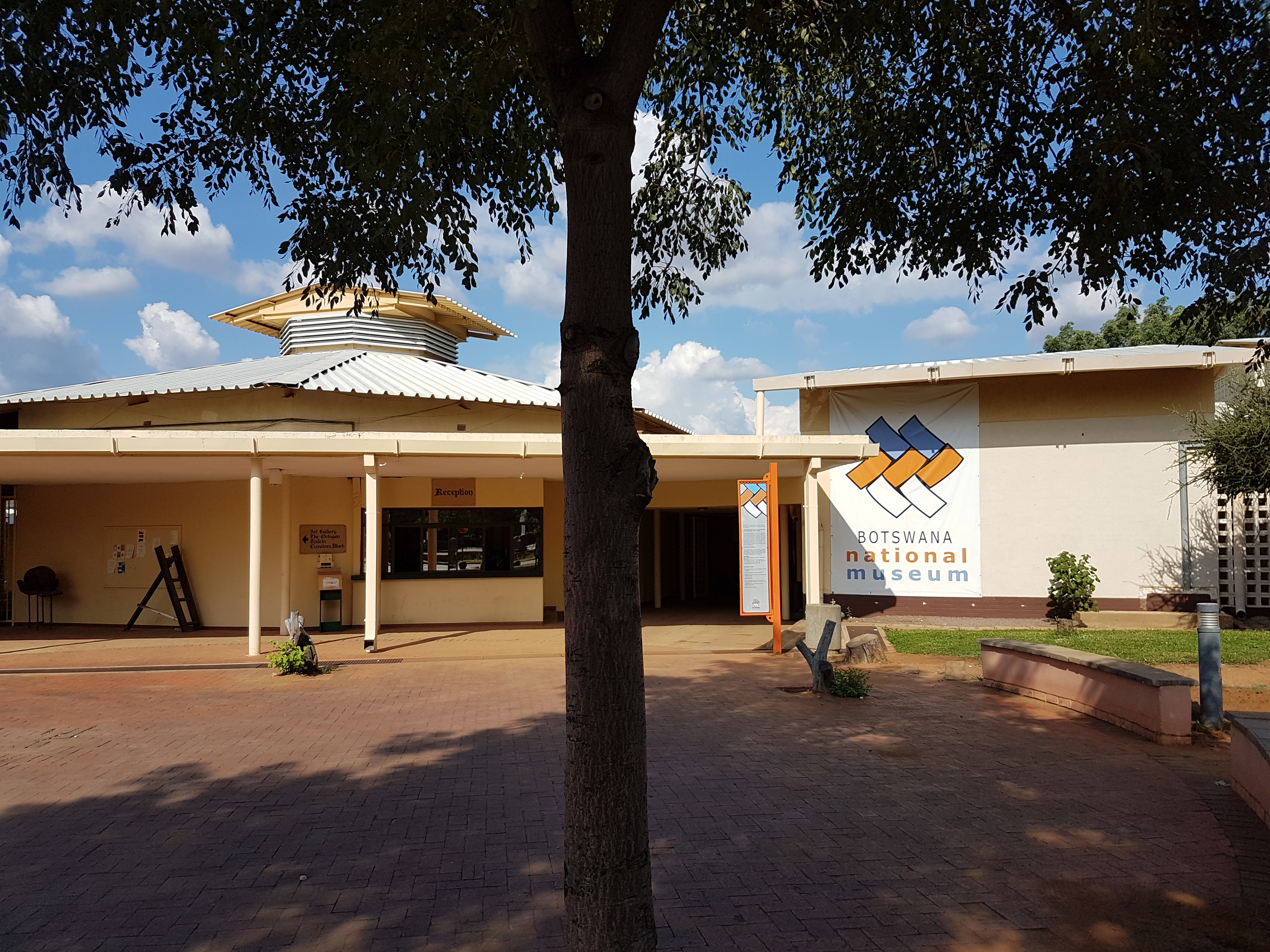
- Museum building (2020)

- Location within Botswana
- Established: 1967
- Location: Gaborone, Botswana
- Coordinates: 24.6565°S 25.9195°E
- Collection size: History of Botswana
- Director: Mr. Gaogakwe Phorano

The Botswana National Museum, also known as the National Museum and Art Gallery, is located in the Botswana capital of Gaborone and is a multi-disciplinary institution that includes the National Art Gallery and Octagon Gallery, as well as—since November 2007—the National Botanical Garden. It displays traditional Botswana crafts and paintings and aims to celebrate the work of local artists.

The museum is also involved with the preservation of Tsodilo, the country's first World Heritage Site, among other efforts. It is the caretaker of Tsholofelo Park, the burial place of the "negro of Banyoles," known as "El Negro" in Botswana, following the body's return from the Darder Museum of Banyoles, in Spain.

The museum was established in 1967 via an Act of Parliament and officially opened to the public in 1968. The museum celebrated a year-long 40th anniversary in 2008 under the banner of "Museum as Agents of Social Change and Development", mirroring the theme used by the International Council of Museums.

== Gallery of the National Museum of Botswana ==
National Museum of Botswana in Pictures

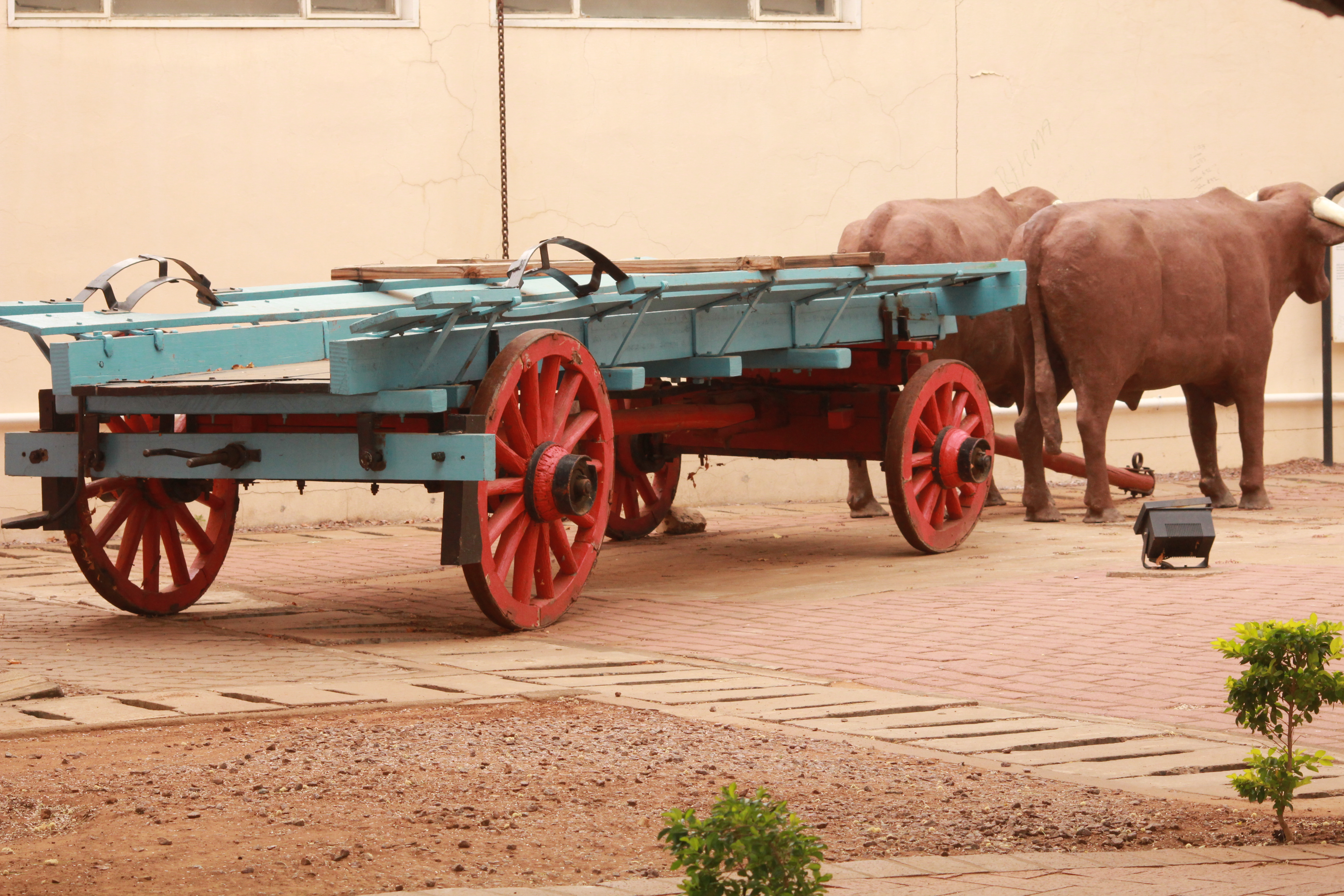
Oxcart on display at Botswana National Museum

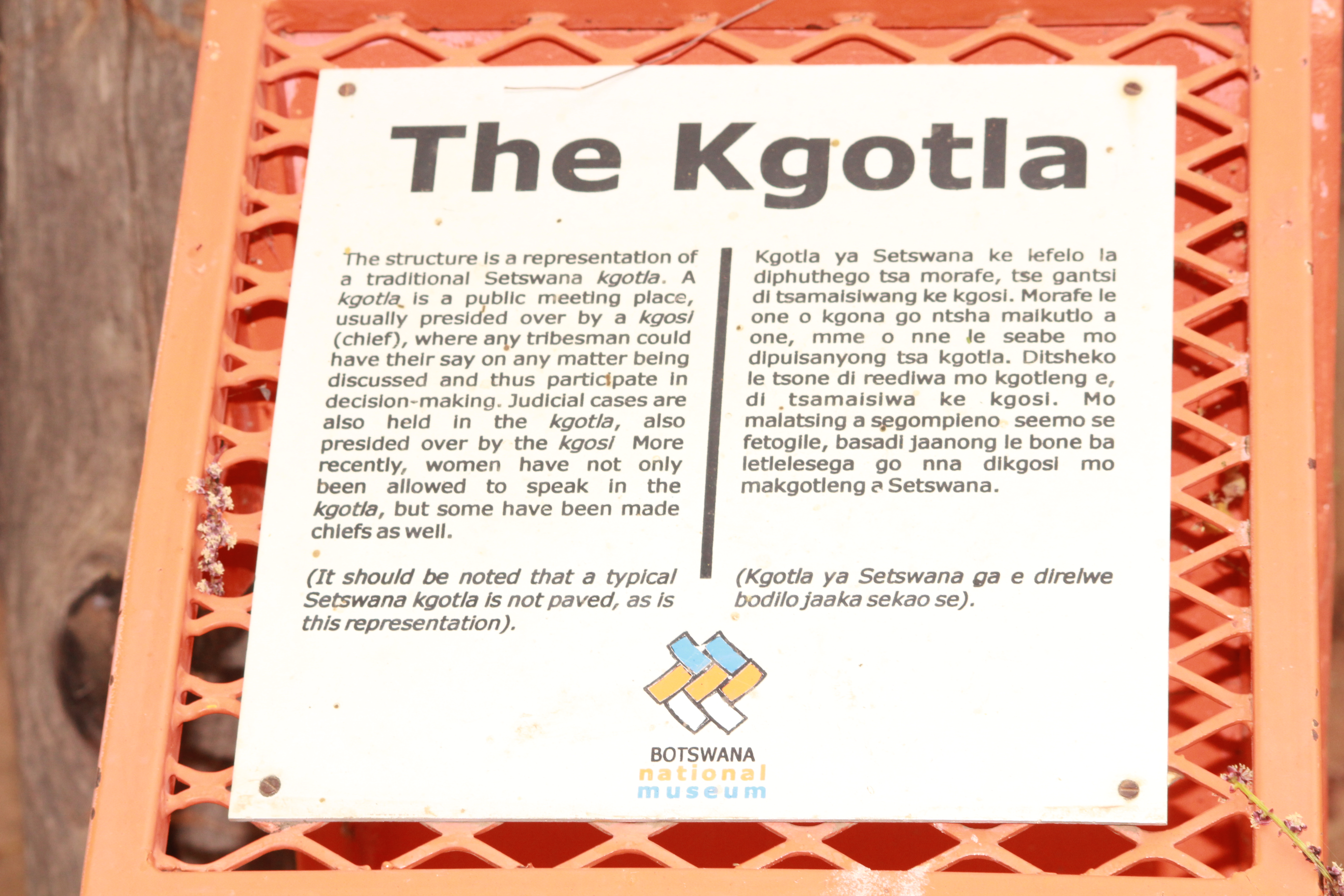
Sign board for Kgotla at the national museum Botswana

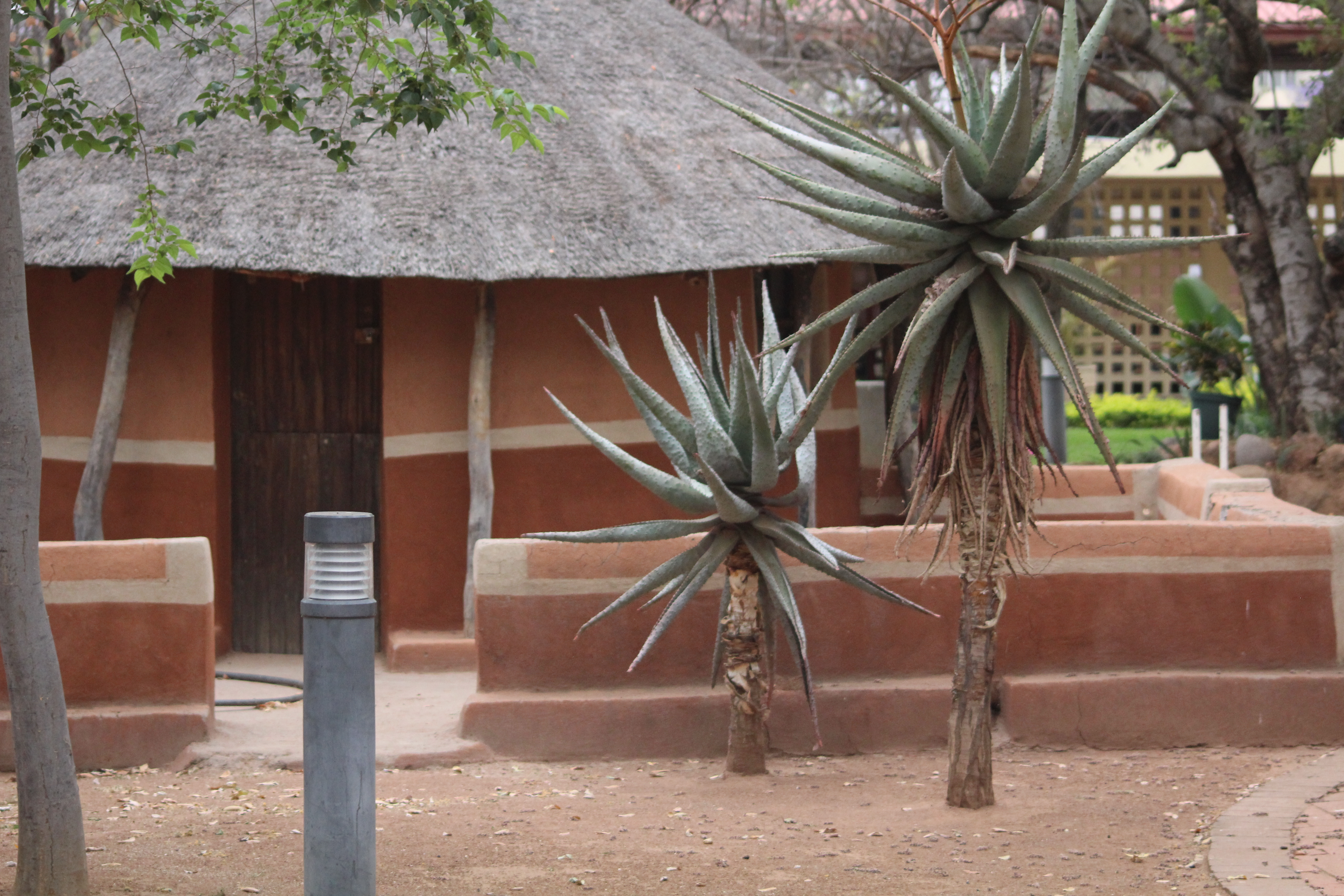
Traditional_House_at_the_national_museum_Botswana

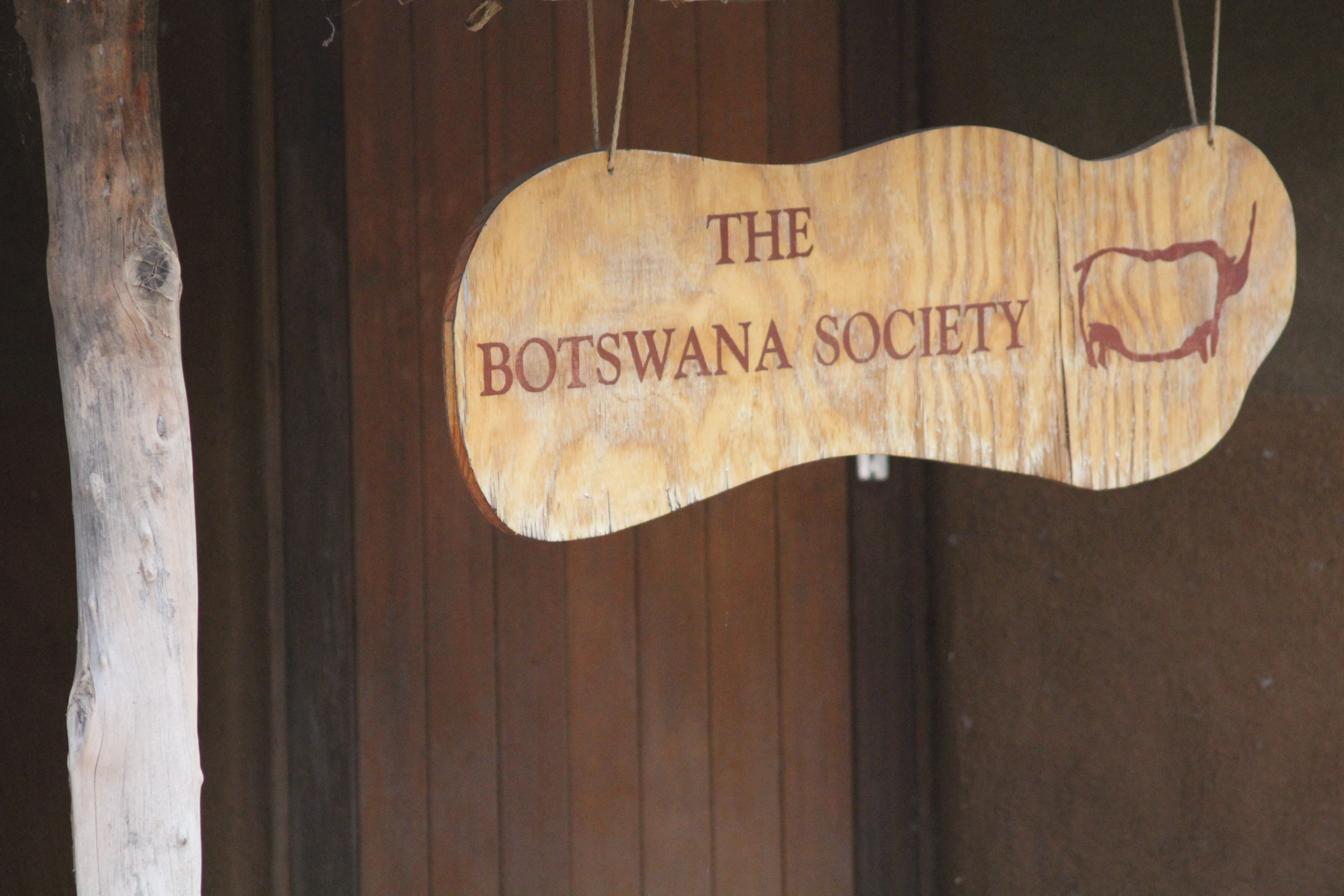
Botswana Society (National museum)

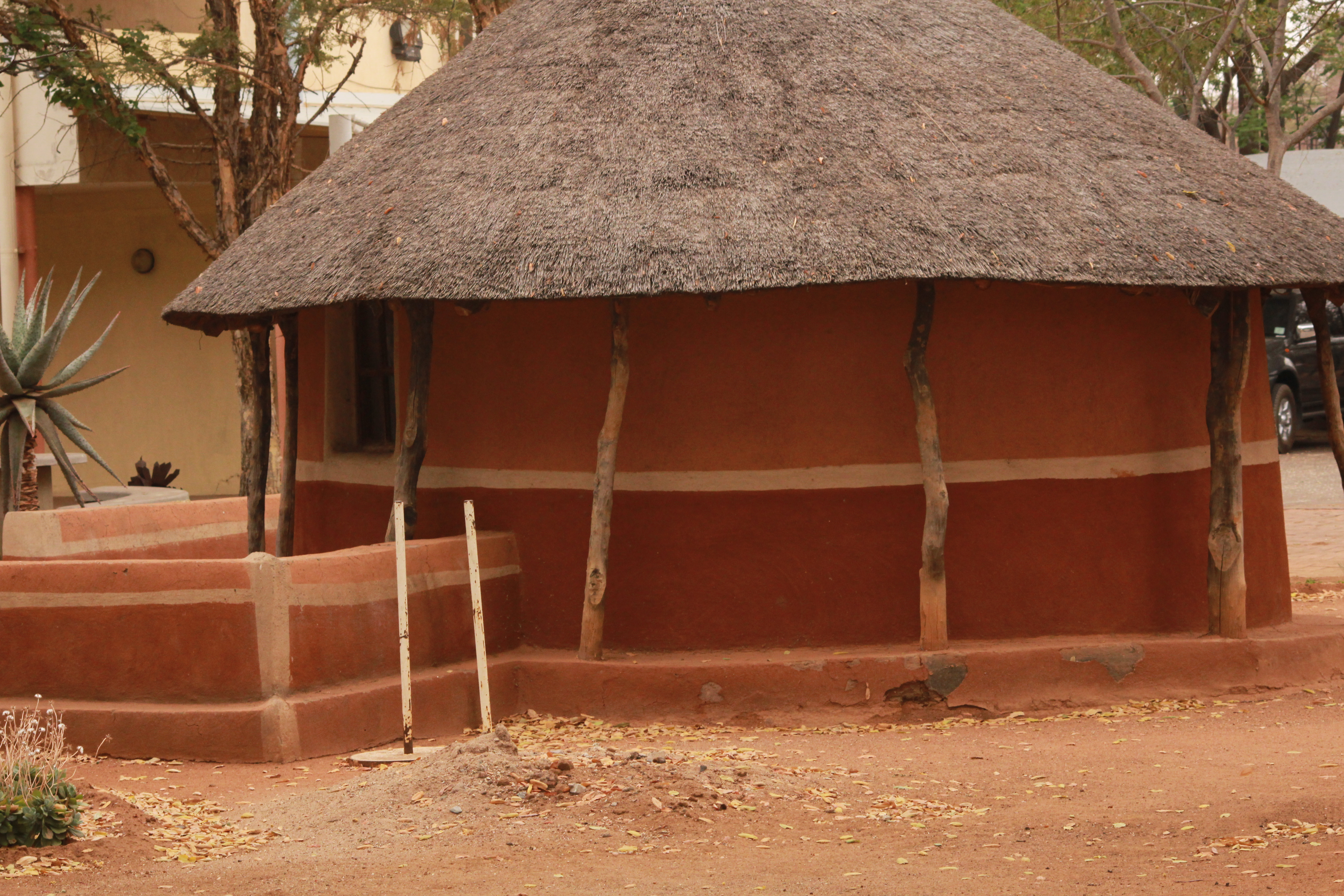
Traditional thatched house at the national museum of Botswana

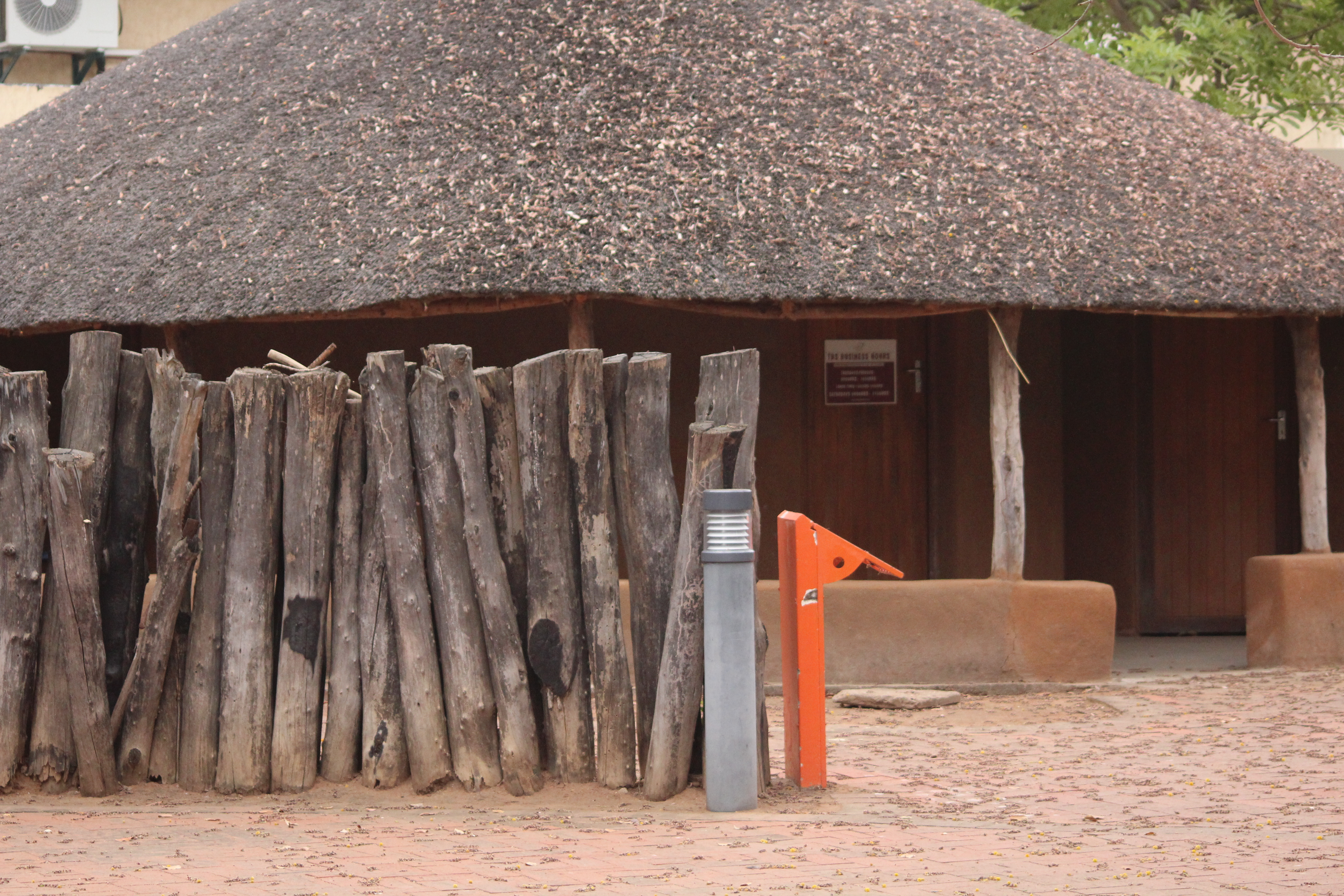
Traditional thatched house at the national museum of Botswana

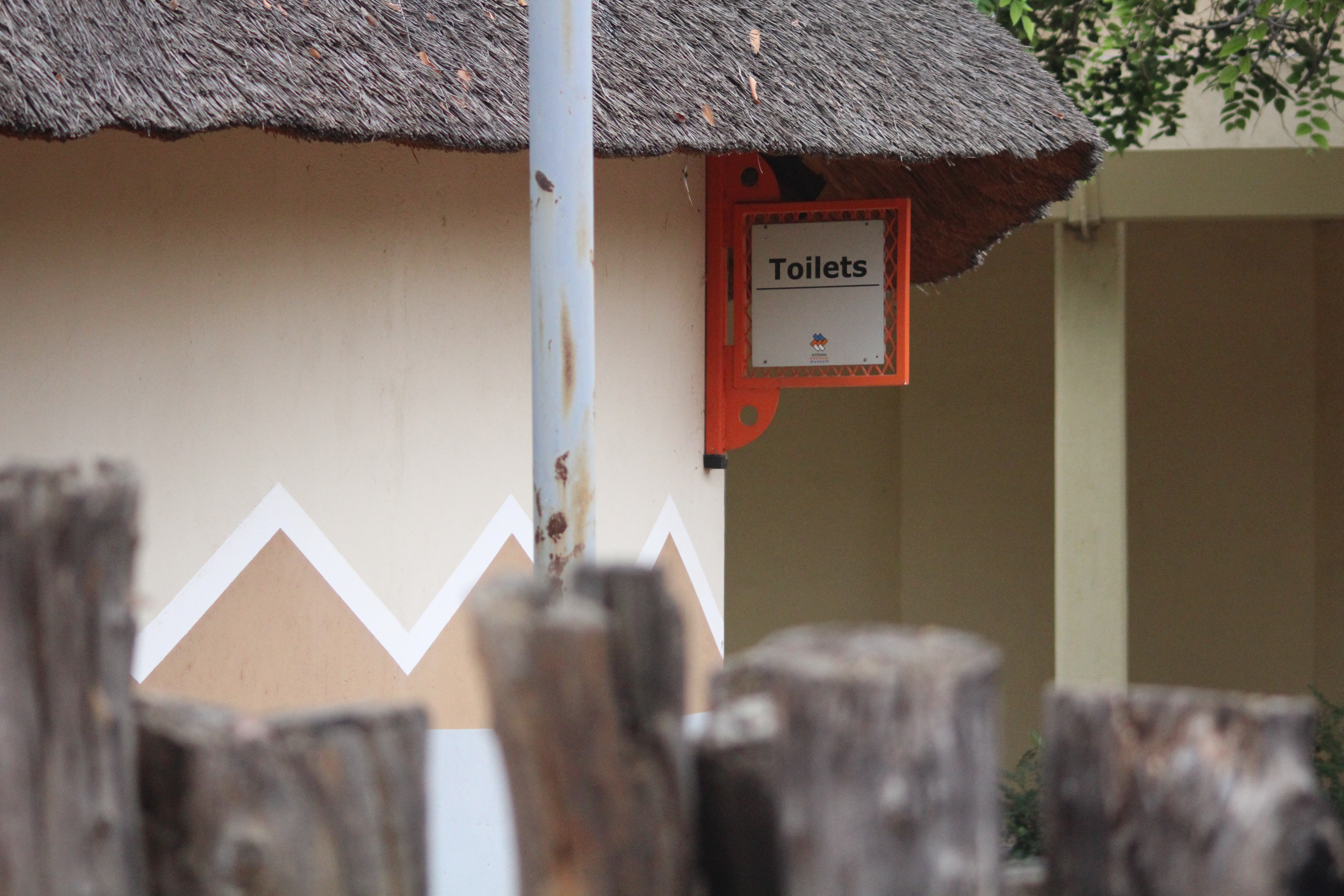
Toilets at the national museum of Botswana
