= Sir Ketumile Masire Teaching Hospital =

- Type: Public
- Established: August 1, 2009; 16 years ago
- Affiliations: University of Botswana
- Administrative staff: 87 (2014)
- Students: 301 (2014)
- Undergraduates: 230 (2014)
- Postgraduates: 71 (2014)
- Location: Gaborone, Botswana; 24.664444°S 25.930278°E
- Campus: Urban

The Sir Ketumile Masire Teaching Hospital (SKMTH), also known as the University of Botswana Medical School, is the school of medicine of the University of Botswana, Botswana's oldest and largest public university. The medical school was established in 2009. The school provides medical education at undergraduate, and postgraduate levels.

== Location ==
The school is located on the main campus of the University of Botswana, in the central business district of Gaborone, the largest city and capital of Botswana. The coordinates of the campus of the University of Botswana Medical School are: 24°39'52.0"S, 25°55'49.0"E (Latitude:-24.664444; Longitude:25.930278). The current medical school campus was established in 2012.

== Teaching hospital ==
The medical school maintains a teaching hospital, approximately 1.5 kilometres (1 mi), by road, north-east of the main campus. The 450-bed hospital was established in 2014.

== Departments ==
As of March 2018, UBMS maintained the following departments:

- Department of Anaesthesia and Critical Care Medicine
- Department of Biomedical Sciences
- Department of Emergency Medicine
- Department of Family Medicine and Public Health
- Department of Internal Medicine
- Department of Medical Education
- Department of Obstetrics and Gynaecology
- Department of Paediatrics and Adolescent Health
- Department of Pathology
- Department of Psychiatry
- Department of Radiology
- Department of Surgery
- Department of Oncology

== Undergraduate courses ==
The following undergraduate courses were offered as of March 2018.

- Bachelor of Medicine and Bachelor of Surgery (MBBS): 5 years

== Partnerships ==
The University of Botswana has maintained a partnership with the Perelman School of Medicine at the University of Pennsylvania and the Botswana Ministry of Health & Wellness since 2001. The partnership is focused on research, clinical care, and training around HIV/AIDS. It employs 120 full-time staff.

== Graduate courses ==
A postgraduate degree of Master of Medicine (MMed) is awarded following three or more years of instruction and examination in any of the following specialties:

- Anatomical Pathology
- Emergency Medicine
- Family Medicine
- Internal Medicine
- Paediatrics and Adolescent Health
- Public Health

== Pioneer class ==
The pioneer class of undergraduates, numbering 36, were admitted in 2009 and graduated in 2014. As of May 2014, the school had a total population of 87 academics and 301 medical students, of whom 230 were undergraduates and 71 were postgraduates. At that time, the areas of postgraduate study included (a) Public Health (b) Internal Medicine (c) Family Medicine and (d) Pediatrics and Adolescent Health.

== See also ==
- Education in Botswana
- Medical education
