= Lobatse =

- Town
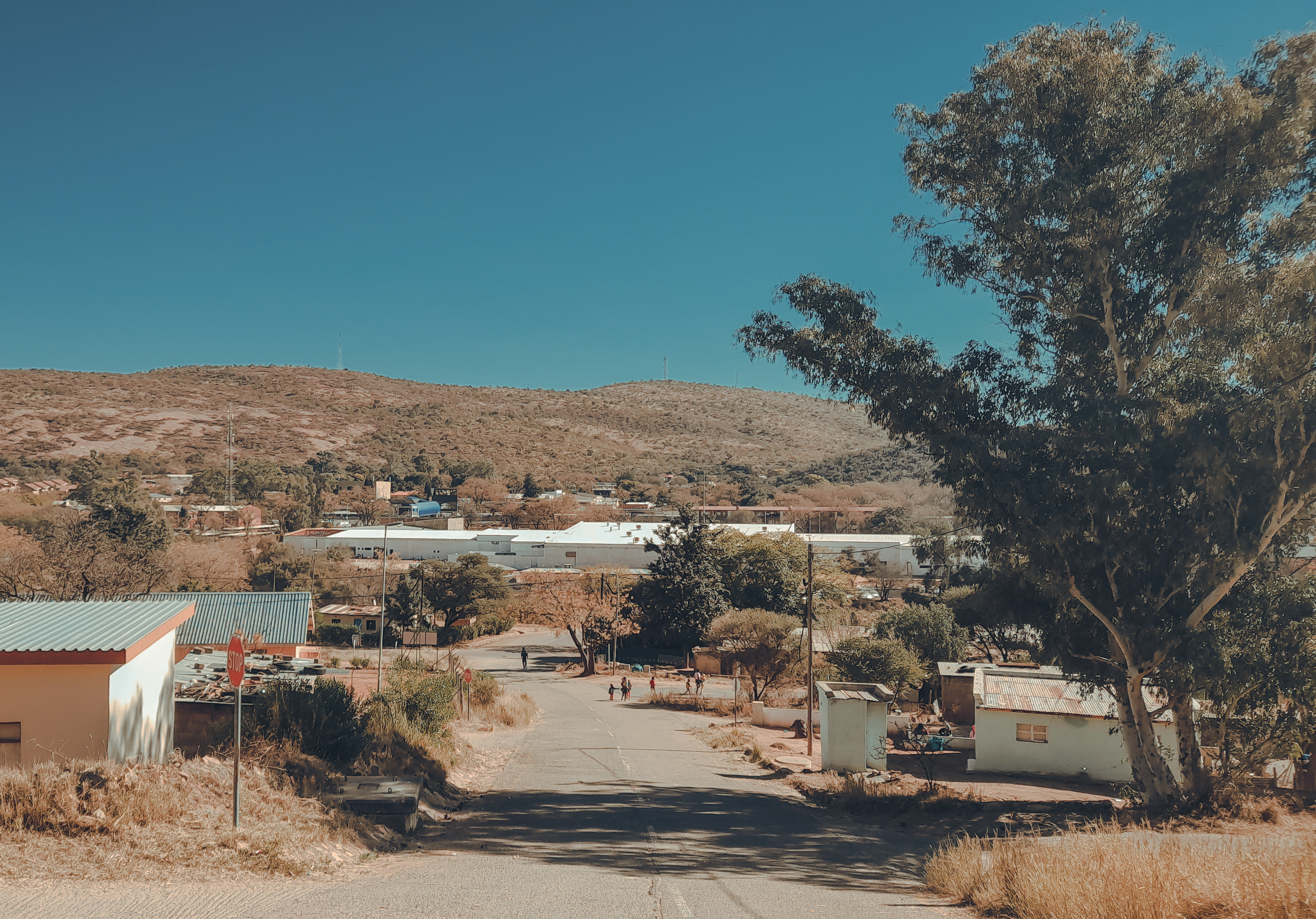

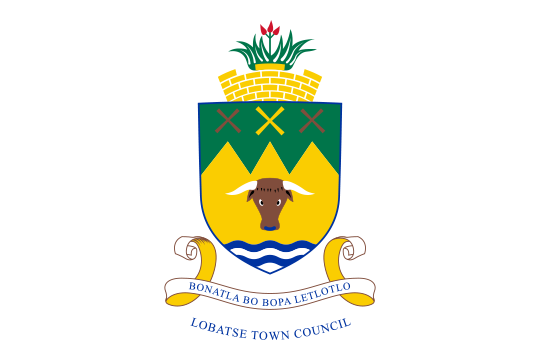
- Flag

- Location within Botswana
- Coordinates: 25°13′S 25°40′E
- Country: Botswana
- Elevation: 1,188 m (3,898 ft)

Population (2022)
  - Total: 29,772
- Time zone: GMT +2
- Climate: BSh

Lobatse is a town in south-eastern Botswana, 70 kilometres south of the capital Gaborone, situated in a valley running north towards Gaborone and on the border with South Africa. Lobatse has a population of 29,772 as of 2022. The town is an administrative district, with a town council.

== History ==
Lobatse was established as an urban settlement in the 18th century and became an important centre during the early development of the country. It served as an administrative centre before the capital was moved to Gaborone and is regarded as one of the country's historic towns. During Botswana's early years, the town was the site of the country's first Parliament and other important government institutions.

== Government and infrastructure ==
Lobatse Senior Secondary School is located in Lobatse. The Botswana Prison Service (BPS) operates the Lobatse Prison. The High Court of Botswana has a branch in Lobatse. There is a psychiatric hospital known as Sbrana Psychiatric Hospital. The town is also home to the Botswana Meat Commission (BMC) which is one of the largest meat processing plants in Africa. Lobatse Stadium with a capacity of 20,000 seats is home to local sports teams.

== Twin Town – Sister City ==
Lobatse is twinned with:

- Walvis Bay, Namibia

== See also ==
- Railway stations in Botswana
- Lobatse Airport
- https://www.botswanatourism.co.bw/explore/lobatse
