= Goodhope, Botswana =

Goodhope
- Location in Botswana
- Coordinates: 25°28′1.64″S 25°26′21.17″E
- Country: Botswana
- District: Goodhope District

Government

Population (2011)
  - Total: 6,362

Goodhope is a village in the Goodhope District of Botswana. It serves as the administrative center for the Goodhope District Council.

== Geography ==
Goodhope has a Primary Hospital, a Land Board (Rolong Land Board) a Clinic, a primary school, a Junior Secondary School, a Secondary School, and a Police Station.

Goodhope is approximately 48 km from Lobatse, which is the nearest town serving all villages with banking services, shopping malls, and other amenities. Goodhope is approximately 115 km from Gaborone, the capital city of Botswana.

== Population ==
The population was 5,777 in the 2011 census.

== Government ==
Goodhope is under the Goodhope-Mabule Constituency represented by MP Eric Molale in the National Assembly.
