= 1999 Botswana Premier League =

Botswana Premier League
- Season: 1999
- Champions: Mogoditshane Fighters (1st title)
- Promoted: No promotions
- Relegated: No relegations
- African Cup of Champions Clubs: Notwane
- African Cup Winners' Cup: Mogoditshane Fighters

The 1999 Botswana Premier League, also known as the 1999 Castle Super League for sponsorship reasons, was the 22nd season of the Botswana Premier League. It was a "mini league" with only half the games played as the Premier League transitioned from the February-November football calendar to the August-May European calendar.

It was won by Mogoditshane Fighters for the first time in their history under the tutelage of David Bright, who became the youngest Motswana to win a league title. The team would also win the 1999 Botswana FA Cup to complete a historic double.

== Team summaries ==
=== Team changes ===
Teams relegated from the 1998 Botswana Premier League

- TASC FC
- Mokgosi Young Fighters

Teams promoted from the 1998 First Division South and 1998 First Division North

- Jwaneng Comets
- FC Satmos

=== Location of teams ===
Locations of teams in the 2023–24 Botswana Premier League

=== Stadiums and locations ===
Team	Location	Ground
BDF XI	Mogoditshane	SSKB Stadium
Extension Gunners	Lobatse	
FC Satmos	Selebi-Phikwe	
Gaborone United	Gaborone	National Stadium
Jwaneng Comets	Jwaneng	
Mochudi Centre Chiefs	Mochudi	
Mogoditshane Fighters	Mogoditshane	
Notwane	Tlokweng	
Police XI	Otse	
Prisons XI	Gaborone	Maruapula SSG Grounds
TAFIC	Francistown	
Township Rollers	Gaborone	National Stadium

=== Number of teams by district ===
Position	District	Number	Teams
1	South-East	6	Extension Gunners, Gaborone United, Notwane, Police XI, Prisons XI, Township Rollers
2	Kweneng District	2	BDF XI, Mogoditshane Fighters
3	North-East	1	TAFIC
3	Central District	1	FC Satmos
3	Kgatleng District	1	Mochudi Centre Chiefs
3	Southern District	1	Jwaneng Comets

== League table ==
Pos	Team	Pld	W	D	L	GF	GA	GD	Pts	Qualification or relegation
1	Mogoditshane Fighters	11	8	1	2	17	5	+12	25	1999 CAF Champions League Preliminary Round
2	BDF XI	11	6	3	2	22	13	+9	21	
3	Mochudi Centre Chiefs	11	6	3	2	20	11	+9	21	
4	Notwane	11	7	0	4	17	13	+4	21	1999 African Cup Winners' Cup (Note: Mogoditshane Fighters qualified as the holders of the FA Cup)
5	Extension Gunners	11	5	3	3	15	12	+3	18	
6	Gaborone United	11	4	3	4	21	20	+1	15	
7	Police XI	11	3	5	3	18	18	0	14	
8	Township Rollers	11	3	2	6	17	20	−3	11	
9	Prisons XI	11	3	2	6	11	16	−5	11	
10	FC Satmos	11	3	2	6	14	20	−6	11	
11	Jwaneng Comets	11	1	5	5	9	22	−13	8	
12	TAFIC	11	1	3	7	9	20	−11	6	

Rules for classification: 1) points; 2) goal difference; 3) goals scored; 4) head-to-head points; 5) head-to-head goal difference; 6) head-to-head goals scored; 7) playoff
