= 2021–22 Botswana Premier League =

Botswana Premier League
- Season: 2021–22
- Dates: 30 October 2021-24 May 2022
- Champions: Gaborone United (7th title)
- Relegated: Notwane; Gilport Lions; MR Highlanders
- CAF Champions League: Gaborone United
- CAF Confederation Cup: Security Systems
- Top goalscorer: Thabang Sesinyi (24 goals)

The 2021–22 Botswana Premier League was the 44th season of the Botswana Premier League, the top-tier football league in Botswana, since its establishment in 1966. The season started on 31 October 2020. Following their title, Gaborone United earned a P3 million sponsorship deal from Bank Gaborone.

== League table ==
Pos	Team	Pld	W	D	L	GF	GA	GD	Pts	Qualification or relegation
1	Gaborone United (C)	30	22	6	2	62	13	+49	72	Qualification for the Champions League
2	Township Rollers	30	20	6	4	46	17	+29	66	
3	Jwaneng Galaxy	30	20	1	9	68	33	+35	61	
4	Orapa United	30	17	7	6	52	25	+27	58	
5	BDF XI	30	15	7	8	39	29	+10	52	
6	Security Systems (Q)	30	12	11	7	49	36	+13	47	Qualification for the Confederation Cup (Note: Since FA Challenge Cup winners Gaborone United qualified for the Champions League, the Confederation Cup place for the cup-winners was given to runners-up Security Systems.)
7	Sua Flamingoes	30	12	11	7	46	34	+12	47	
8	Police XI	30	12	7	11	36	33	+3	43	
9	Extension Gunners	30	12	2	16	43	53	−10	38	
10	Morupule Wanderers	30	10	7	13	35	41	−6	37	
11	Masitaoka FC	30	8	11	11	35	35	0	35	
12	Mogoditshane Fighters	30	7	6	17	30	54	−24	27	
13	Prisons XI	30	6	7	17	30	70	−40	25	
14	Notwane (R)	30	5	5	20	24	56	−32	20	Relegation
15	Gilport Lions (R)	30	4	7	19	23	55	−32	19	Relegation
16	MR Highlanders (R)	30	4	7	19	23	57	−34	19	Relegation

Source: RSSF
Rules for classification: 1) points; 2) goal difference; 3) number of goals scored.
(C) Champions; (Q) Qualified for the phase indicated; (R) Relegated

== Stadiums ==
Team	Location	Stadium	Capacity
Botswana Defence Force XI	Mogoditshane	SSKB Stadium	5,000
Botswana Police XI	Gaborone	Botswana National Stadium	25,000
Extension Gunners	Lobatse	Lobatse Stadium	20,000
Gaborone United	Gaborone	Botswana National Stadium	25,000
Gilport Lions	Lobatse	Lobatse Stadium	20,000
Jwaneng Galaxy	Jwaneng	Galaxy Stadium	2,000
MR Highlanders	Molepolole	Serowe Sports Complex	6,600
Masitaoka	Molepolole		
Mogoditshane Fighters	Mogoditshane		
Morupule Wanderers	Molepolole	Serowe Sports Complex	6,600
Notwane	Gaborone	Botswana National Stadium	25,000
Orapa United	Orapa	Itekeng Stadium	5,000
Prisons XI Gaborone	Otse	Botswana Police College Stadium	1,500
Security Systems	Molepolole	Serowe Sports Complex	6,600
Sua Flamingoes			
Township Rollers	Gaborone	Botswana National Stadium	25,000
