= 1998 Botswana Premier League =

Botswana Premier League
- Season: 1998
- Champions: Notwane (3rd title)
- Promoted: Satmos; Jwaneng Comets
- Relegated: TASC FC; Mokgosi Young Fighters
- African Cup of Champions Clubs: Notwane
- African Cup Winners' Cup: BDF XI

The 1998 Botswana Premier League, also known as the 1998 Castle Super League for sponsorship reasons, was the 21st season of the Botswana Premier League. It was won by Notwane.

The league was won by Notwane F.C., led by coach Paul Moyo. As of 2019, it is the last time Notwane have lifted the league title.

== Team summaries ==
=== Team changes ===
Teams relegated from the 1997 Botswana Premier League

- BMC
- Nico United

Teams promoted from the 1997 First Division South and 1997 First Division North

- Mokgosi Young Fighters
- TASC FC

=== Location of teams ===
Locations of teams in the 2023–24 Botswana Premier League

=== Stadiums and locations ===
Team	Location	Ground
BDF XI	Mogoditshane	SSKB Stadium
Extension Gunners	Lobatse	
Gaborone United	Gaborone	National Stadium
Mochudi Centre Chiefs	Mochudi	
Mogoditshane Fighters	Mogoditshane	
Mokgosi Young Fighters	Ramotswa	
Notwane	Tlokweng	
Police XI	Otse	
Prisons XI	Gaborone	Maruapula SSG Grounds
TAFIC	Francistown	
TASC FC	Francistown	
Township Rollers	Gaborone	National Stadium

=== Number of teams by district ===
Position	District	Number	Teams
1	South-East	7	Extension Gunners, Gaborone United, Mokgosi Young Fighters, Notwane, Police XI, Prisons XI, Township Rollers
2	Kweneng District	2	BDF XI, Mogoditshane Fighters
2	North-East	2	TAFIC, TASC FC
3	Kgatleng District	1	Mochudi Centre Chiefs

== League table ==
Pos	Team	Pld	W	D	L	GF	GA	GD	Pts	Qualification or relegation
1	Notwane	22	11	6	5	35	20	+15	39	1999 CAF Champions League Preliminary Round
2	BDF XI	22	11	6	5	26	24	+2	39	1999 African Cup Winners' Cup (Note: BDF XI qualified as the holders of the FA Cup)
3	Police XI	22	9	8	5	34	30	+4	35	
4	Extension Gunners	22	9	7	6	31	28	+3	34	
5	Gaborone United	22	9	5	8	39	33	+6	32	
6	Prisons XI	22	6	12	4	23	23	0	30	
7	Mochudi Centre Chiefs	22	7	9	6	30	31	−1	30	
8	TAFIC	22	7	7	8	30	29	+1	28	
9	Mogoditshane Fighters	22	8	3	11	31	41	−10	27	
10	Township Rollers	22	5	9	8	28	26	+2	24	
11	TASC FC	22	5	4	13	28	41	−13	19	Relegation to 1999 Botswana First Division
12	Mokgosi Young Fighters	22	3	8	11	25	34	−9	17	Relegation to 1999 Botswana First Division

Rules for classification: 1) points; 2) goal difference; 3) goals scored; 4) head-to-head points; 5) head-to-head goal difference; 6) head-to-head goals scored; 7) playoff
