= 2024 Botswana FA Cup =

Football tournament season in Botswana

2024 FA Challenge Cup (Botswana)
Tournament details
- Country: Botswana
- Dates: 10 February-15 June 2024

Final positions
- Champions: Jwaneng Galaxy (1st title)
- Runners-up: Orapa United

Tournament statistics
- Matches played: 47
- Goals scored: 109 (2.32 per match)
- Top goal scorer(s): Onkabetse Makgantai; Bakang Makgoloke (4 goals)

Awards
- Best player: Daniel Msendami

The 2024 FA Challenge Cup was the 50th edition of the FA Challenge Cup, Botswana's premier football knockout tournament. It was sponsored by Orange and was known as the Orange FA Cup or Orange FA Cup Season 5 for sponsorship reasons. It started with the preliminary round on the weekend of 10 February and concluded with the final on 15 June 2024.

Gaborone United were the defending champions but were eliminated on penalties in the quarterfinals by Jwaneng Galaxy, who went on to eliminate Orapa United in the final to claim their first title.

== Qualifying rounds ==
All 16 Premier League teams automatically qualified to the round of 32. The top 8 teams from First Division South and top 8 from First Division North had to go through the preliminary round and were joined by the 16 regional champions. Winners of this round qualified for the round of 32.

== Preliminary round ==
The preliminary round draw took place on 20 December 2023. The draw was seeded into two, namely the northern and southern blocks. Northern block games were played on 10 and 11 February while southern block games were played on 17 and 18 February.

Northern block

| Date | Home | Score | Away | Ground |
|---|---|---|---|---|
| 10 February | Makungulupeswa | 2-3 | City Kings | |
| 10 February | Sankoyo Bush Bucks | 2-3 | Santa Green | |
| 10 February | Pilikwe United | 0-3 | Chadibe North | |
| 10 February | Kazungula Young Fighters | 2-1 | Motlakase Power Dynamos | |
| 10 February | Mmadinare Giant Aces | 0-5 | TAFIC | |
| 11 February | Desert Buffaloes | 0-3 | Tsabotlhe | |
| 11 February | Mahalapye Railway Highlanders | 1-2 | Shoshong United | |
| 11 February | Mbalakalungu | 0-0 (4-2 pens.) | Calendar Stars | |

Southern block

| Date | Home | Score | Away | Ground |
|---|---|---|---|---|
| 17 February | Blue Stars | 0-3 | Taung Young Strikers | |
| 17 February | Notwane | 2-0 | Uniao Flamengo Santos | |
| 17 February | Desert Nxau | 3-1 | Walker United | |
| 17 February | Magosi | 0-1 | Mochudi Centre Chiefs | |
| 17 February | VTM | 3-0 | Matebele | |
| 18 February | City Polar | 0-2 | Pula Roofing | |
| 18 February | Sand Diamonds | 1-1 (5-4 pens.) | Jwaneng Young Stars | |
| 18 February | Tlokweng United | 1-1 (4-5 pens.) | UB Hawks | |

== Round of 32 ==
The round of 32 draw was conducted on 18 February 2024. It was not seeded. City Kings, Kazungula Young Fighters, Shoshong United, Mbalakalungu, Taung Young Strikers, Pula Roofing and Sand Diamonds from Division One were the lowest ranked teams still in the competition.

| Date | Home | Score | Away | Ground |
|---|---|---|---|---|
| 2 March | City Kings | 1-1 (4-2 pens.) | Mochudi Centre Chiefs | |
| 2 March | Desert Nxau | 0-0 (1-3 pens.) | Pula Roofing | |
| 2 March | Mbalakalungu | 0-0 (4-3 pens.) | BDF XI | |
| 2 March | Shoshong United | 0-2 | VTM | |
| 2 March | Gaborone United | 5-1 | Prisons XI | |
| 3 March | UB Hawks | 1-1 (6-5 pens.) | Notwane | |
| 3 March | Santa Green | 1-1 (0-2 pens.) | Orapa United | |
| 3 March | Extension Gunners | 1-3 | Sua Flamingoes | |
| 9 March | Jwaneng Galaxy | 4-0 | Holy Ghost | |
| 9 March | Sand Diamonds | 1-2 | TAFIC | |
| 9 March | Nico United | 1-0 | Morupule Wanderers | |
| 9 March | Police XI | 1-1 (4-2 pens.) | Eleven Angels | |
| 9 March | Taung Young Strikers | 1-1 (1-4 pens.) | Chadibe North | |
| 9 March | Kazungula Young Fighters | 0-2 | Township Rollers | |
| 9 March | Tsabotlhe | 1-0 | Mogoditshane Fighters | |
| 10 March | Masitaoka | 1-2 | Security Systems | |

== Round of 16 ==
The round of 16 draw was conducted on 10 March. It was not seeded. City Kings, Mbalakalungu and Pula Roofing were the lowest ranked team still in the competition.

| Date | Home | Score | Away | Ground |
|---|---|---|---|---|
| 13 April | City Kings | 0-1 | Police XI | |
| 13 April | UB Hawks | 0-0 (9-8 pens.) | VTM | |
| 13 April | Pula Roofing | 1-1 (4-5 pens) | Sua Flamingoes | |
| 13 April | Mbalakalungu | 0-0 (2-3 pens.) | TAFIC | |
| 13 April | Tsabotlhe | 1-3 | Jwaneng Galaxy | |
| 13 April | Township Rollers | 1-0 | Nico United | |
| 14 April | Chadibe North | 1-4 | Orapa United | |
| 14 April | Security Systems | 0-0 (5-6 pens.) | Gaborone United | Black Forest Arena |

== Quarterfinals ==
The quarterfinal draw was conducted on 14 April after the conclusion of the round of 16. It was not seeded. UB Hawks from First Division South was the lowest ranked club still in the competition.

| Date | Home | Score | Away | Ground |
|---|---|---|---|---|
| 4 May | UB Hawks | 1-0 | Police XI | |
| 4 May | TAFIC | 1-0 | Sua Flamingoes | |
| 4 May | Township Rollers | 1-2 | Orapa United | |
| 5 May | Gaborone United | 1-1 (12-13 pens.) | Jwaneng Galaxy | |

== Semifinals ==
The semifinal draw was conducted on 4 May. UB Hawks was the lowest ranked team still in the competition.

| Date | Home | Score | Away | Ground |
|---|---|---|---|---|
| 11 May | UB Hawks | 0-1 | Jwaneng Galaxy | National Stadium |
| 11 May | TAFIC | 1-2 | Orapa United | National Stadium |

== Final ==
| Date | Winners | Score | Runners-up | Ground |
|---|---|---|---|---|
| 15 June | Jwaneng Galaxy | 2-1 | Orapa United | Obed Itani Chilume Stadium |

== Awards ==
- Top goalscorer | (Botswana) Onkabetse Makgantai | TAFIC
  (Botswana) Bakang Makgoloke | Taung Young Strikers (4 goals)
- Player of the tournament | (Zimbabwe) Daniel Msendami | Jwaneng Galaxy
- Goalkeeper of the tournament | (Botswana) Goitseone Phoko | Jwaneng Galaxy
- Coach of the tournament | (South Africa) Morena Ramoreboli | Jwaneng Galaxy
- Fan of the tournament | (Botswana) Kago Audrey | Prisons XI
