= 2022 Botswana FA Cup =

Football tournament season in Botswana

2022 FA Challenge Cup (Botswana)
Tournament details
- Country: Botswana
- Dates: 26 February-18 June 2022

Final positions
- Champions: Gaborone United (8th title)
- Runners-up: Security Systems

Tournament statistics
- Matches played: 47
- Goals scored: 131 (2.79 per match)
- Top goal scorer(s): Monty Enosa; Thato Ogopotse (5 goals)

The 2022 FA Challenge Cup was the 48th edition of the FA Challenge Cup, Botswana's premier football knockout tournament. It was sponsored by Orange and was known as the Orange FA Cup or Orange FA Cup Season 3 for sponsorship reasons. It started with the preliminary round on the weekend of 26 February and concluded with the final on 18 June 2022.

Gaborone United were the defending champions and went on to retain the cup after beating Security Systems in the final, extending their record and becoming the first club since Mogoditshane Fighters in 2000 to successfully defend the title.

== Qualifying rounds ==
All 16 Premier League teams automatically qualified to the round of 32. The top 8 teams from First Division South and top 8 from First Division North had to go through the preliminary round and were joined by the 16 regional champions. Winners of this round qualified for the round of 32.

== Preliminary round ==
The preliminary round draw took place on 9 February 2022. The draw was seeded into two, namely the northern and southern blocks. Northern block games were played on 26 and 27 February while southern block games were played on 5 and 6 March.

Northern block

Date	Home	Score	Away	Ground
26 February	Tsabotlhe	1-0	Sankoyo Bush Bucks	
26 February	Chadibe United	4-3	Chobe United	
26 February	Maun Heroes	0-5	Eleven Angels	
26 February	Sua Flamingoes	4-1	Santa Green	
26 February	Peacemakers	3-2	Maun Terrors	
27 February	BIUST All Stars	0-0 (5-4 pens.)	Boston	
27 February	Calendar Stars	2-0	Motlakase Power Dynamos	
27 February	Pearisa	0-4	Nico United	

Southern block

Date	Home	Score	Away	Ground
5 March	Mochudi Centre Chiefs	3-1	Masitaoka	National Stadium
5 March	Broadhurst United	1-1 (2-4 pens.)	Kgabosetso	
5 March	Black Forest	0-0 (5-3 pens.)	Black Rangers	
5 March	Maruapula Hungry Leopards	1-5	Matebele	
6 March	Uniao Flamengo Santos	0-2	Holy Ghost	
6 March	Tlokweng Red Sparks	2-0	Tlokweng United	Tlokweng VDC Grounds
26 March^{1}	Skoon Boys	0-1	Mogoditshane Fighters	Charleshill Ground
27 March^{2}	Lokgwabe United	0-1	Motaung Young Fighters	Tshane Prisons Ground

^{1} The match was originally supposed to be played on 5 March but was postponed due to the pitch being waterlogged as a result of heavy rains.

^{2} The match was originally supposed to be played on 5 March but was postponed due to the pitch being waterlogged as a result of heavy rains.

== Round of 32 ==
The round of 32 draw was conducted on 18 January 2022. It was not seeded. Tsabotlhe, BIUST All Stars, and Kgabosetso from Division One were the lowest ranked teams still in the competition.

Date	Home	Score	Away	Ground
22 April	Tsabotlhe	0-0 (3-4 pens.)	Sua Flamingoes	Serowe Sports Complex
22 April	Gilport Lions	0-1	Township Rollers	National Stadium
23 April	BIUST All Stars	3-1	Tlokweng Red Sparks	Serowe Sports Complex
23 April	Miscellaneous	0-2	Police XI	Serowe Sports Complex
23 April	Motaung Young Fighters	1-6	Gaborone United	Mahusane Primary
23 April	Notwane	0-3	TAFIC	National Stadium
23 April	Security Systems	2-0	Mochudi Centre Chiefs	National Stadium
23 April	Peacemakers	0-1	Eleven Angels	Semolale Grounds
23 April	Chadibe United	0-1	Calendar Stars	Chadibe Stadium
23 April	Molepolole City Stars	0-2	BDF XI	Lobatse Sports Complex
23 April	Kgabosetso	1-4	Extension Gunners	Lobatse Sports Complex
24 April	Nico United	4-1	MR Highlanders	Sam Sono Stadium
24 April	Holy Ghost	2-1	Orapa United	Holy Ghost Park
24 April	Black Forest	1-0	Morupule Wanderers	Black Forest Arena
24 April	Mogoditshane Fighters	0-0 (2-4 pens.)	Jwaneng Galaxy	Galaxy Stadium
24 April	Matebele	1-0	Prisons XI	SSG Ground

== Round of 16 ==
The round of 16 draw was conducted on 24 April. It was not seeded. BIUST All Stars was the lowest ranked team still in the competition.

Date	Home	Score	Away	Ground
29 April	Calendar Stars	0-5	Gaborone United	Obed Itani Chilume Stadium
30 April	BIUST All Stars	0-3	Extension Gunners	Serowe Sports Complex
30 April	Nico United	1-2	Sua Flamingoes	Sam Sono Stadium
30 April	Eleven Angels	1-2	Police XI	Obed Itani Chilume Stadium
30 April	Township Rollers	1-2	Security Systems	Lobatse Sports Complex
31 April	Holy Ghost	1-1 (1-3 pens.)	BDF	Holy Ghost Park
31 April	Black Forest	1-2	Jwaneng Galaxy	Black Forest Arena
4 May^{1}	Matebele	3-0	TAFIC	SSG Ground

^{1} The match was originally scheduled to be played on 30 April but was abandoned with Matebele leading 1-0 due to the pitch being waterlogged after heavy rains.

== Quarterfinals ==
The quarterfinal draw was conducted on 1 May after the conclusion of the round of 16. It was not seeded. Matebele from First Division South was the lowest ranked club still in the competition.

Date	Home	Score	Away	Ground
7 May	Sua Flamingoes	0-6	BDF XI	Sua Town Council Stadium
7 May	Matebele	0-0 (3-1 pens.)	Jwaneng Galaxy	The Nest Stadium
7 May	Police XI	1-2	Gaborone United	National Stadium
8 May	Extension Gunners	1-2	Security Systems	Lobatse Sports Complex

== Semifinals ==
The semifinal draw was conducted on 24 May.

Date	Home	Score	Away	Ground
11 June	Security Systems	2-1	BDF XI	National Stadium
11 June	Gaborone United	2-1 a.e.t.	Matebele	National Stadium

== Final ==
Date	Winners	Score	Runners-up	Ground
18 June	Security Systems	1-2	Gaborone United	National Stadium
