= 2023–24 Botswana Premier League =

Botswana Premier League
- Season: 2023–24
- Champions: Jwaneng Galaxy; 3rd title
- Relegated: Eleven Angels; Police XI; Holy Ghost
- Champions League: Jwaneng Galaxy
- Confederation Cup: Orapa United
- Top goalscorer: Thabang Sesinyi (15 goals)

The 2023–24 Botswana Premier League season was the 46th season of the Botswana Premier League, the top-tier football league in Botswana, since its establishment in 1966. The season started in October 2023. Jwaneng Galaxy FC were the defending champions after winning the 2022-23 season.

This season was intended to see four teams relegated instead of the usual two, with only two teams going up from the second tier, namely the Botswana First Division North and Botswana First Division South. This was due to an intended league re-structuring from the BFA who were planning to decrease the number of teams from 16 to 12. However, the re-structuring was delayed, and the 2024–25 Botswana Premier League also started with 16 teams.

== League Changes ==
Newly promoted teams included TAFIC, who won the Botswana First Division North, Matebele FC, the champion of the Botswana First Division South, and VTM FC whom beat Chadibe after a 6-5 penalty victory to ensure promotion.

They replaced Prisons XI, Extension Gunners, and Mogoditshane Fighters, who were relegated after the 2022–23 season.

Additionally, a rule change was carried out by the BFA. Before, only international players could be signed when they had played 3 caps for their country. However, after Township Rollers signed three South African players who did not follow the requirements, plus more criticism among the public and football pundits, the BFA decided to withdraw the rule for the 2023/24 season. However, they will start a process to further develop the amendments and rules of the Botswana Premier League.

== Teams ==
Locations of teams in the 2023–24 Botswana Premier League

Club	City / Town	Position in 2022-23
BDF XI	Gaborone	10th
Eleven Angels	Francistown	6th
Gaborone United	Gaborone	2nd
Holy Ghost SC	Gaborone	13th
Jwaneng Galaxy	Jwaneng	1st
Masitaoka	Gaborone	7th
Matebele FC	Matebeleng	Promoted
Morupule Wanderers	Palapye	12th
Nico United	Selebi-Phikwe	11th
Orapa United	Orapa	3rd
Police XI	Otse	9th
Security Systems	Otse	5th
Sua Flamingoes	Sowa	8th
TAFIC	Francistown	Promoted
Township Rollers	Gaborone	4th
VTM FC	Gaborone	Promoted

== League Table ==
Pos	Team	Pld	W	D	L	GF	GA	GD	Pts	Qualification or relegation
1	Jwaneng Galaxy (C)	30	20	5	5	45	17	+28	65 (Note: Fifteen clubs were penalized when Week 13 and 14 matches were not played. As a result, there are more losses than wins. The boycott was due to a controversial downsizing plan. As result, the participating teams were awarded three points and two goals for each affected match, while the boycotting teams were given zero points and zero goals for each match involved, and all Week 13 and 14 games are not played. Teams that received points (in parentheses): Gaborone United (6), Security Systems (3), VTM (3). Teams with their number of losses (in parentheses): BDF (2), Eleven Angels (2), Holy Ghost (2), Jwaneng Galaxy (2), Masitaoka (2), Matebele (2), Morupule Wanderers (2), Nico United (2), Orapa United (2), Police (2), Sua Flamingoes (2), TAFIC (2), Township Rollers (2), Security Systems (1), VTM (1).)	Qualification for the Champions League
2	Township Rollers	30	19	7	4	52	16	+36	64	
3	Gaborone United	30	19	6	5	50	20	+30	63	
4	Security Systems	30	13	5	12	39	40	−1	44	
5	TAFIC	30	10	8	12	32	37	−5	38	
6	VTM	30	10	7	13	31	33	−2	37	
7	Sua Flamingoes	30	10	6	14	36	32	+4	36	
8	BDF XI	30	8	12	10	21	23	−2	36	
9	Masitaoka	30	9	9	12	25	29	−4	36	
10	Orapa United	30	7	11	12	27	27	0	32	Qualification for the Confederation Cup (Note: Orapa United qualified for the Confederation Cup as the 2024 FA Challenge Cup runners-up, since the FA Challenge Cup winners Jwaneng Galaxy has already qualified for the CAF Champions League as Premier League champions.)
11	Matebele	30	7	11	12	32	36	−4	32	
12	Nico United	30	7	11	12	27	33	−6	32	
13	Morupule Wanderers	30	7	9	14	35	44	−9	30	
14	Eleven Angels (R)	30	5	10	15	28	44	−16	25	Relegation to First Division North or First Division South
15	Police XI (R)	30	5	9	16	23	42	−19	24	Relegation to First Division North or First Division South
16	Holy Ghost (R)	30	5	8	17	20	50	−30	23	Relegation to First Division North or First Division South

Source: RSSSF
Rules for classification: 1) Points; 2) Goal difference; 3) Goals scored
(C) Champions; (R) Relegated

== Attendances ==
#	Football club	Average attendance
1	Township Rollers	1,881
2	Jwaneng Galaxy	1,162
3	Gaborone United	989
4	TAFIC	482
5	VTM FC	474
6	SS XI	458
7	Sua Flamingoes	444
8	BDF XI	421
9	Masitaoka FC	405
10	Orapa United	379
11	Matebele FC	355
12	Nico United	326
13	Morupule Wanderers	302
14	Eleven Angels	196
15	Police XI	172
16	Holy Ghost SC	145
