= 1999–2000 Botswana Premier League =

Botswana Premier League
- Season: 1999–2000
- Champions: Mogoditshane Fighters (2nd title)
- Promoted: BMC; TASC
- Relegated: Gaborone United; Prisons XI
- African Cup of Champions Clubs: Mogoditshane Fighters

The 1999–2000 Botswana Premier League, also known as the 1999–2000 Castle Super League for sponsorship reasons, was the 23rd season of the Botswana Premier League. It was played from 4 September 1999 to 17 May 2000.

Mogoditshane Fighters, who were the defending champions, would go on to successfully defend both the league title and the FA Cup. The season was also marked by the relegation of former champions Gaborone United.

== Team summaries ==
=== Team changes ===
Due to the transitional nature of the 1999 season, there were no changes for the 1999–2000 season.

=== Location of teams ===
Locations of teams in the 2023–24 Botswana Premier League

=== Stadiums and locations ===
Team	Location	Ground
BDF XI	Mogoditshane	SSKB Stadium
Extension Gunners	Lobatse	
FC Satmos	Selebi-Phikwe	
Gaborone United	Gaborone	National Stadium
Jwaneng Comets	Jwaneng	
Mochudi Centre Chiefs	Mochudi	
Mogoditshane Fighters	Mogoditshane	
Notwane	Tlokweng	
Police XI	Otse	
Prisons XI	Gaborone	Maruapula SSG Grounds
TAFIC	Francistown	
Township Rollers	Gaborone	National Stadium

=== Number of teams by district ===
Position	District	Number	Teams
1	South-East	6	Extension Gunners, Gaborone United, Notwane, Police XI, Prisons XI, Township Rollers
2	Kweneng District	2	BDF XI, Mogoditshane Fighters
3	North-East	1	TAFIC
3	Central District	1	FC Satmos
3	Kgatleng District	1	Mochudi Centre Chiefs
3	Southern District	1	Jwaneng Comets

== League table ==
Pos	Team	Pld	W	D	L	GF	GA	GD	Pts	Qualification or relegation
1	Mogoditshane Fighters	22	13	3	6	32	20	+12	42	2001 CAF Champions League Preliminary Round
2	Mochudi Centre Chiefs	22	12	4	6	25	18	+7	40	
3	BDF XI	22	10	7	5	37	23	+14	37	
4	Jwaneng Comets	22	10	5	7	23	25	−2	35	2001 African Cup Winners' Cup (Note: Mogoditshane Fighters qualified as the holders of the FA Cup)
5	Police XI	22	9	5	8	37	31	+6	32	
6	Notwane	22	9	5	8	32	30	+2	32	
7	TAFIC	22	7	8	7	28	25	+3	29	
8	Township Rollers	22	7	8	7	28	32	−4	29	
9	FC Satmos	22	7	6	9	20	27	−7	27	
10	Extension Gunners	22	5	9	8	31	27	+4	24	
11	Gaborone United	22	5	8	9	26	30	−4	23	Relegated to Botswana First Division South
12	Prisons XI	22	1	6	15	18	39	−21	9	Relegated to Botswana First Division North

Rules for classification: 1) points; 2) goal difference; 3) goals scored; 4) head-to-head points; 5) head-to-head goal difference; 6) head-to-head goals scored; 7) playoff
