= 1997 Botswana Premier League =

Botswana Premier League
- Season: 1997
- Champions: BDF XI (5th title)
- Promoted: Mokgosi Young Fighters; TASC
- Relegated: BMC; Nico United
- African Cup of Champions Clubs: BDF XI
- African Cup Winners' Cup: Notwane

The 1997 Botswana Premier League, also known as the 1997 Castle Super League for sponsorship reasons, was the 20th season of the Botswana Premier League. It was won by BDF XI.

BDF XI glided to a comfortable finish, opening a five-point gap to deny Gaborone United, Notwane and Mochudi Centre Chiefs (all of which were locked on second position) the title and add a fifth to the trophy cabinet.

== Team summaries ==
=== Team changes ===
Teams relegated from the 1996 Botswana Premier League

- TASC
- Boteti Young Fighters

Teams promoted from the 1996 First Division South and 1996 First Division North

- Mogoditshane Fighters
- TAFIC

=== Location of teams ===
Locations of teams in the 2023–24 Botswana Premier League

=== Stadiums and locations ===
Team	Location	Ground
BDF XI	Mogoditshane	SSKB Stadium
BMC	Lobatse	
Extension Gunners	Lobatse	
Gaborone United	Gaborone	National Stadium
Mochudi Centre Chiefs	Mochudi	
Mogoditshane Fighters	Mogoditshane	
Nico United	Selebi-Phikwe	
Notwane	Tlokweng	
Police XI	Otse	
Prisons XI	Gaborone	Maruapula SSG Grounds
TAFIC	Francistown	
Township Rollers	Gaborone	National Stadium

=== Number of teams by district ===
Position	District	Number	Teams
1	South-East	7	BMC, Extension Gunners, Gaborone United, Notwane, Police XI, Prisons XI, Township Rollers
2	Kweneng District	2	BDF XI, Mogoditshane Fighters
3	North-East	1	TAFIC
3	Central District	1	Nico United
3	Kgatleng District	1	Mochudi Centre Chiefs

== League table ==
Pos	Team	Pld	W	D	L	GF	GA	GD	Pts	Qualification or relegation
1	BDF XI (C)	22	12	4	6	39	29	+10	40	1998 CAF Champions League Preliminary Round (Note: Due to the Super League running parallel to the CAF calendar, BDF XI & Notwane would only be eligible to enter the 1998 editions of the respective CAF competitions they qualified for.)
2	Gaborone United	22	10	5	7	35	24	+11	35	
3	Notwane	22	9	8	5	36	29	+7	35	1998 African Cup Winners' Cup#Preliminary round (Note: Notwane qualified as holders of the FA Cup.)
4	Mochudi Centre Chiefs	22	10	5	7	33	27	+6	35	
5	Police XI	22	8	7	7	30	30	0	31	
6	Prisons XI	22	7	9	6	30	31	−1	30	
7	Township Rollers	22	6	11	5	23	24	−1	29	
8	Extension Gunners	22	9	1	12	33	31	+2	28	
9	TAFIC	22	7	7	8	21	22	−1	28	
10	Mogoditshane Fighters	22	7	6	9	24	25	−1	27	
11	BMC	22	5	7	10	24	41	−17	22	Relegated to Botswana First Division South
12	Nico United	22	5	4	13	34	49	−15	19	Relegated to Botswana First Division North

(C) Champions
