= 1992 Botswana Premier League =

Botswana Premier League
- Season: 1992
- Champions: LCS Gunners (1st title)
- Promoted: Mogoditshane Fighters
- Relegated: Jwaneng Comets
- African Cup of Champions Clubs: LCS Gunners
- African Cup Winners' Cup: TAFIC

The 1992 Botswana Premier League, also known as the 1992 Castle Super League for sponsorship reasons, was the 26th season of the Botswana Premier League. It was the first to feature 12 teams, an improvement from the 10 teams of the previous season.

== Season summary ==
Extension Gunners, then known as LCS Gunners due to sponsorship by Lobatse Cash Stores, topped the log to win their first title ahead of much fancied teams including defending champion BDF XI. Gunners would also win the FA Cup to mark their league victory as more than just a fluke.

== League table ==
Pos	Team	Pld	W	D	L	GF	GA	GD	Pts	Qualification or relegation
1	LCS Gunners (C)	22	13	4	5	48	24	+24	30	1993 CAF Champions League Preliminary Round (Note: Due to the Super League running parallel to the CAF calendar, LCS Gunners & TAFIC would only be eligible to enter the 1993 editions of the respective CAF competitions they qualified for.)
2	TAFIC	22	12	5	5	34	22	+12	29	1993 African Cup Winners' Cup#Preliminary Round (Note: LCS Gunners, the holders of the domestic cup, had already qualified for the African Cup of Champions Clubs, and were thus replaced in the Cup Winners Cup by the FA Cup runners-up TAFIC.)
3	Township Rollers	22	11	6	5	34	23	+11	28	
4	TASC	22	8	9	5	25	24	+1	25	
5	BDF XI	22	6	10	6	22	23	−1	22	
6	BMC	22	7	8	7	24	26	−2	22	
7	Gaborone United	22	7	7	8	25	23	+2	21	
8	Police XI	22	8	5	9	26	39	−13	21	
9	Nico United	22	5	9	8	28	28	0	19	
10	Mochudi Centre Chiefs	22	5	9	8	24	33	−9	19	
11	Notwane	22	6	6	10	25	25	0	18	
12	Jwaneng Comets	22	2	6	14	17	41	−24	10	Relegated to Botswana First Division South

(C) Champions
