= 2024–25 Botswana Premier League =

Football league season

Botswana Premier League
- Season: 2024–25
- Dates: 4 October 2024 – 24 May 2025
- Champions: Gaborone United (8th titles)
- Relegated: Chadibe; Union Flamengo Santos; Security Systems
- Champions League: Gaborone United
- Top goalscorer: Jean Lwamba (6 goals)

The 2024–25 FNB Botswana Premier League season is the 47th season of the Botswana Premier League, the top-tier football league in Botswana, since its establishment in 1966. The season was planned to start on September 21, 2024, but was postponed to September 28, and then October 4. Jwaneng Galaxy FC are the current title holders from the 2023-24 season.

The season starts with 16 teams even though last season it was introduced that four teams would relegate instead of two. Due to concerns of the participating teams, the BFA decided to remain with 16 teams in the BPL. This season was the first of FNB's three year sponsorship of the league.

At the end of the season, three teams will be relegated into either the Botswana First Division North or the Botswana First Division South.

== League changes ==
Eleven Angels, Police XI, and Holy Ghost relegated from the 2023–24 Botswana Premier League. They were replaced by Chadibe, who won the Botswana First Division North and Union Flamingo Santos, who won the playoff final against Motlakase Power Dynamos. Young Stars won the Botswana First Division South, but their Premier League license was acquired by Extension Gunners, which means the team from Lobatse returns to the Premier League after a one-year absence.

Due to financial issues of Masitaoka and VTM FC, their licenses were available for purchase. Mochudi Centre Chiefs acquired the license of Masitaoka, which saw Magosi return to Premier League after their relegation in 2018-19. VTM FC ended up retaining their franchise, and remained in the Premier League.

=== Stadiums and locations ===
Locations of teams in the 2024–25 Botswana Premier League

Club	City / Town	Position in 2023-24
BDF XI	Gaborone	7th
Chadibe	Chadibe	Promoted
Extension Gunners	Lobatse	Promoted
Gaborone United	Gaborone	3rd
Jwaneng Galaxy	Jwaneng	1st
Matebele FC	Matebeleng	11th
Mochudi Centre Chiefs	Mochudi	Promoted
Morupule Wanderers	Palapye	13th
Nico United	Selebi-Phikwe	12th
Orapa United	Orapa	10th
Security Systems	Otse	4th
Sua Flamingoes	Sowa	9th
TAFIC	Francistown	5th
Township Rollers	Gaborone	2nd
Union Flamengo Santos	Gabane	Promoted
VTM FC	Gaborone	6th

== League table ==
Pos	Team	Pld	W	D	L	GF	GA	GD	Pts	Qualification or relegation
1	Gaborone United (C, Q)	30	20	6	4	56	23	+33	66	Qualification for the 2025–26 CAF Champions League
2	TAFIC	30	17	9	4	51	23	+28	60	
3	Sua Flamingoes	30	17	8	5	63	31	+32	59	
4	Jwaneng Galaxy	30	15	14	1	43	20	+23	59	
5	Mochudi Centre Chiefs	30	15	11	4	46	20	+26	56	
6	Township Rollers	30	15	9	6	37	28	+9	54	
7	Morupule Wanderers	30	12	6	12	41	36	+5	42	
8	Orapa United	30	9	13	8	36	31	+5	40	
9	VTM	30	8	11	11	36	33	+3	35	
10	Nico United	30	7	11	12	18	32	−14	32	
11	BDF XI	30	7	10	13	28	33	−5	31	
12	Matebele	30	8	6	16	30	45	−15	30	
13	Extension Gunners	30	8	5	17	25	48	−23	29	
14	Security Systems (R)	30	6	8	16	30	45	−15	26	Relegation to First Division North or First Division South
15	Chadibe (R)	30	2	10	18	19	62	−43	16	Relegation to First Division North or First Division South
16	Union Flamengo Santos (R)	30	2	7	21	18	67	−49	13	Relegation to First Division North or First Division South

Source: https://www.rsssf.org/tablesb/bots2025.html
Rules for classification: 1) Points; 2) Goal difference; 3) Goals scored
(C) Champions; (Q) Qualified for the phase indicated; (R) Relegated
