= Daniel Msendami =

Tanzanian footballer (born 2000)

Personal information
- Date of birth: 24 October 2000 (age 26)
- Place of birth: Bulawayo, Zimbabwe
- Height: 1.71 m (5 ft 7 in)
- Position: Winger

Team information
- Current team: Orlando Pirates
- Number: 45

Youth career
- 2014–2018: Highlanders

Senior career*
Years	Team	Apps	(Gls)
2018–2022	Highlanders		
2019	→ Vubachikwe (loan)		
2022–2023	→ Jwaneng Galaxy (loan)	25	(7)
2023–2024	Jwaneng Galaxy	28	(12)
2024–2026	Marumo Gallants	39	(4)
2026–	Orlando Pirates	7	(1)

International career^{‡}
2024–	Zimbabwe	11	(0)
- * Club domestic league appearances and goals as of 23:55, 21 December 2025 (UTC) ‡ National team caps and goals as of 23:55, 21 December 2025 (UTC)

Daniel Msendami (born 24 October 2000) is a Zimbabwean professional footballer who plays as a winger for South African Premiership club Orlando Pirates and the Zimbabwe national team.

== Club career ==
Msendami began his senior career with Highlanders in the Zimbabwe Premier Soccer League in 2018. On 1 September 2022, he joined the Botswana Premier League club Jwaneng Galaxy on a season-long loan with an option to buy. On 9 January 2023, Jwaneng Galaxy activated the option to sign Msendami officially. He helped Jwaneng win the 2022–23 Botswana Premier League. He won the 2024 Botswana FA Cup where he was named player of the tournament. He also helped the club win the 2023–24 Botswana Premier League and was nominated for player of the season.

On 1 July 2024, he transferred to the South African Premiership club Marumo Gallants on a two-year contract.

Msendami joined Orlando Pirates in January 2026.

== International career ==
Mwaikenda made the senior Zimbabwe national team for the 2025 Africa Cup of Nations.

== Honours ==
Jwaneng Galaxy

- Botswana Premier League: 2022–23, 2023–24
- Botswana FA Challenge Cup: 2024

Individual

- 2024 Botswana FA Cup Player of the Tournament
