= 2016–17 Mascom Top 8 Cup =

Mascom Top 8 Season 6

Tournament details
- Country: Botswana
- Dates: 28 October 2016 – 1 April 2017
- Teams: 8

Final positions
- Champions: Jwaneng Galaxy (1st title)
- Runners-up: Orapa United

Tournament statistics
- Matches played: 13
- Goals scored: 37 (2.85 per match)
- Top goal scorer(s): Roger Katjiteo; Tendai Nyumasi (4 goals)

Awards
- Best player: Boitumelo Mafoko

The 2016–17 Mascom Top 8 Cup, also known as the Mascom Top 8 Season 6, was the sixth edition of the Mascom Top 8 Cup. It was played from 28 October 2016 to 1 April 2017 by the top eight teams from the 2015-16 Botswana Premier League. It was won by Jwaneng Galaxy.

== History ==
The 2016–17 Mascom Top 8 Cup was the only domestic tournament played in Botswana since the FA Cup was not contested. The winner qualified to represent Botswana in the 2018 CAF Confederation Cup. This honour was won by Jwaneng Galaxy.

== Prize money ==
- Champions: P1 200 000
- Runners up: P550 000
- Semifinalists: P300 000
- Quarterfinalists: P170 000

== Format ==
The quarterfinals and semifinals were played over two legs both home and away, with only one final in a predetermined venue. Three points were awarded for a win, one point for a draw and none for a loss. Aggregate score was used to determine the winner of a round. Where the aggregate score was equal away goals were used to pick out the victor and if those were equal the tied teams went into a penalty shootout. There was no quarterfinal draw. The teams were seeded based on their position in the table, with the first placed team facing off against the eighth placed team.

== Participants ==
Team	Location	League position
Mochudi Centre Chiefs	Mochudi	1
Township Rollers	Gaborone	2
Orapa United	Orapa	3
BDF XI	Mogoditshane	4
Gaborone United	Gaborone	5
Miscellaneous	Serowe	6
Jwaneng Galaxy	Jwaneng	7
Police XI	Otse	8

== Quarter-finals ==
First legs
Date	Home	Score	Away
October 28	Police XI	0-1	Township Rollers
October 29	Orapa United	0-0	Miscellaneous
October 30	Mochudi Centre Chiefs	0-0	Jwaneng Galaxy
October 31	BDF XI	3-1	Gaborone United

Second legs
Date	Home	Score	Away
November 11	Miscellaneous	1-1	Orapa United
November 12	Gaborone United	1-1	BDF XI
November 13	Jwaneng Galaxy	2-0	Mochudi Centre Chiefs
November 14	Township Rollers	4-2	Police XI

== Semi-finals ==
First legs
Date	Home	Score	Away
January 27	Orapa United	2-0	Township Rollers
January 28	BDF XI	0-1	Jwaneng Galaxy

Second legs
Date	Home	Score	Away
February 25	Jwaneng Galaxy	3-3	BDF XI
February 26	Township Rollers	1-2	Orapa United

== Final ==
Final
Date	Winners	Score	Runners up
April 1	Jwaneng Galaxy	4-3	Orapa United

== Awards ==
- Top goalscorer | (Namibia) Roger Katjiteo (4 goals) | BDF XI

(Zimbabwe) Tendai Nyumasi (4 goals) | Orapa United

- Player of the tournament | (Botswana) Boitumelo Mafoko | Jwaneng Galaxy
- Goalkeeper of the tournament | (Botswana) Anthony Gouws | Jwaneng Galaxy
- Coach of the tournament | (Zambia) Mike Sithole | Jwaneng Galaxy
- Referee of the tournament | (Botswana) Keabetswe Dintwa
- Assistant referee of the tournament | (Botswana) Bakwena Simankalele
