= Kaone Vanderwesthuizen =

Motswana footballer

Personal information
- Full name: Kaone Vanderwesthuizen
- Date of birth: 5 October 1994 (age 32)
- Place of birth: Struizendam
- Positions: Left back; centreback

Team information
- Current team: notwane
- Number: 21

Senior career*
Years	Team	Apps	(Gls)
2014–2015	Letlapeng		
2015-	Township Rollers		

International career^{‡}
2018-	Botswana	4	(0)
- * Club domestic league appearances and goals as of 29 August 2009 ‡ National team caps and goals as of 4 October 2019

Kaone Vanderwesthuizen (born 1 December 1994) is a Motswana footballer playing for Township Rollers F.C. in the Botswana Premier League.

== International career ==
Vanderwesthuizen made his Botswana debut in a 2–0 loss to Eritrea in the 2018 FIFA World Cup qualifiers.

== Honours ==
=== Club ===
Township Rollers

- Botswana Premier League:4

2015-16, 2016-17, 2017-18, 2018-19

- Mascom Top 8 Cup:1

2017-18
