= Wendell Rudath =

Namibian footballer

Personal information
- Birth name: Wendell Rudath
- Date of birth: 7 October 1995 (age 31)
- Place of birth: Windhoek, Namibia
- Height: 1.75 m (5 ft 9 in)
- Position: Forward

Team information
- Current team: Jwaneng Galaxy
- Number: 9

Senior career*
Years	Team	Apps	(Gls)
2013–2015	Civics		
2015–2021	Black Africa		
2021–	Jwaneng Galaxy		

International career
2019–	Namibia	16	(2)
- * Club domestic league appearances and goals

Wendell Wella Rudath (born 7 October 1995), is a Namibian professional footballer who plays as a forward for Jwaneng Galaxy and the Namibia national team.

== Club career ==
Rudath began his senior career in his native Namibia with Civics in 2013 in the Namibia Premier League. On 2015, he moved to Black Africa, and there won the 2018–19 Namibia Premier League. In 2021, he moved to the Matswana club Jwaneng Galaxy, and there won the 2022–23 Botswana Premier League.

== International career ==
Rudath debuted with the senior Namibia national team in a 0–0 2020 African Nations Championship qualification tie with Comoros on 4 August 2019. He was part of Namibia's squad for the 2020 African Nations Championship. He was called up to the national team for the 2023 Africa Cup of Nations.

== Honours ==
Black Africa

- Namibia Premier League: 2018–19

Jwaneng Galaxy

- Botswana Premier League: 2022–23
