= Alford Velaphi =

Matswana footballer (born 1999)

Personal information
- Date of birth: 18 January 1999 (age 27)
- Place of birth: Gaborone, Botswana
- Height: 1.91 m (6 ft 3 in)
- Position: Centre-back

Team information
- Current team: Gaborone United
- Number: 4

Youth career
- Gaborone United

Senior career*
Years	Team	Apps	(Gls)
2017–	Gaborone United		

International career^{‡}
2022–	Botswana	33	(0)
- * Club domestic league appearances and goals as of 23:55, 21 December 2025 (UTC) ‡ National team caps and goals as of 23:55, 21 December 2025 (UTC)

Alford Velaphi (born 18 January 1999) is a Motswana professional footballer who plays as a centre-back for Botswana Premier League club Gaborone United and the Botswana national team.

== Club career ==
Velaphi began his senior career with Botswana Premier League club Gaborone United in 2017, and helped them win 3 Botswana FA Challenge Cups and 2 Botswana Premier Leagues.

== International career ==
Velaphi made the senior Botswana national team for the 2025 Africa Cup of Nations.

== Honours ==
Gaborone United

- Botswana FA Challenge Cup: 2020, 2022, 2023
- Botswana Premier League: 2021–22, 2024–25
