= Morena Ramoreboli =

Football manager

Morena Cuthbert Moreboli
Personal information
- Place of birth: Rosendal, South Africa

Team information
- Current team: South Africa (assistance coach)

Managerial career
- Years: Team
- January 2013- December 2014: Maluti FET College
- December 2014- October 2015: African Warriors
- 2021–2023: Jwaneng Galaxy
- 2021: South Africa (caretaker)
- 2023: South Africa (caretaker)
- 2025–2026: Botswana
- 2026–: South Africa (assistant coach)

Morena Ramoreboli is a South African manager who currently is an assistant coach South Africa Football Team. He previously managed Botswana Premier League side Jwaneng Galaxy Football Club.

== Career ==
He first emerged in 2013 when leading third tier Maluti FET College to victory over Orlando Pirates in the 2012–13 Nedbank Cup.

He later took over as caretaker coach of the South Africa national soccer team, Bafana Bafana, and led them to the 2021 COSAFA Cup title.

After taking charge of Jwaneng Galaxy, he led them to the group stages of the African Champions League for the first time in 2021–22.

Galaxy failed to defend their title in 2021–22, but won again in 2022–23 to qualify for the 2023–24 CAF Champions League. They knocked out the 1995 champions, South Africa's Orlando Pirates, in the qualifying rounds to again make the group stages, where they proceeded to shock another three-time African champion, Morocco's Wydad AC, 1-0.

On 23 January 2025 he was appointed as the head coach of the Botswana national team.

Ramoreboli left the role in September 2026 to join South Africa as assistant coach.

== Honours ==
South Africa national soccer team

- COSAFA CUP: 2021

Jwaneng Galaxy

- Botswana Premier League: 2022–23, 2023–24
- Botswana FA Challenge Cup: 2024
