= 2022–23 Botswana Premier League =

Football season

Botswana Premier League
- Season: 2022-23
- Dates: 22 October 2022 - 10 June 2023
- Champions: Jwaneng Galaxy (2nd title)
- Relegated: Prisons XI Extension Gunners Mogoditshane Fighters
- Top goalscorer: Omaatla Kebatho (23 goals)

The 2022–23 Botswana Premier League was the 45th season of the Botswana Premier League, the top-tier football league in Botswana, since its establishment in 1966. Jwaneng Galaxy FC secured their second title, earning P750.000 for their victory. Extension Gunners from Lobatse were relegated for the first time in their history, finishing 15th.

== League Table ==
| Pos | Team | Pld | W | D | L | GF | GA | GD | Pts | Qualification or relegation |
|---|---|---|---|---|---|---|---|---|---|---|
| 1 | Jwaneng Galaxy FC (C) | 30 | 22 | 6 | 2 | 66 | 22 | +44 | 72 | Qualification for the Champions League |
| 2 | Gaborone United | 30 | 19 | 7 | 4 | 62 | 18 | +44 | 64 | Qualification for the Confederation Cup |
| 3 | Orapa United | 30 | 19 | 3 | 8 | 69 | 31 | +38 | 60 | |
| 4 | Township Rollers | 30 | 13 | 15 | 3 | 41 | 28 | +13 | 53 | |
| 5 | Security Systems | 29 | 15 | 4 | 11 | 49 | 36 | +13 | 48 | |
| 6 | Eleven Angels | 30 | 12 | 8 | 10 | 32 | 30 | +2 | 44 | |
| 7 | Masitaoka FC | 30 | 13 | 4 | 13 | 37 | 35 | +2 | 43 | |
| 8 | Sua Flamingoes | 30 | 12 | 5 | 13 | 48 | 40 | +8 | 41 | |
| 9 | Police XI | 30 | 11 | 7 | 12 | 28 | 34 | -6 | 40 | |
| 10 | BDF XI | 30 | 10 | 9 | 11 | 37 | 36 | +1 | 39 | |
| 11 | Nico United | 30 | 9 | 9 | 12 | 27 | 36 | -9 | 36 | |
| 12 | Morupule Wanderers | 29 | 9 | 8 | 12 | 26 | 36 | -10 | 35 | |
| 13 | Holy Ghost | 30 | 7 | 8 | 15 | 28 | 46 | -18 | 29 | |
| 14 | Prisons XI (R) | 30 | 5 | 8 | 17 | 17 | 59 | -42 | 23 | Relegation |
| 15 | Extension Gunners (R) | 30 | 4 | 9 | 18 | 24 | 54 | -30 | 20 | Relegation |
| 16 | Mogoditshane Fighters (R) | 30 | 3 | 6 | 21 | 20 | 72 | -51 | 15 | Relegation |

Source: Sofascore

Rules for classification: 1) points; 2) goal difference; 3) number of goals scored.

(C) Champion; (Q) Qualified for the phase indicated; (R) Relegated
