= Edwin Moalosi =

Motswana footballer

Personal information
- Full name: Edwin Moalosi
- Date of birth: 26 October 1988 (age 38)
- Place of birth: Otse, Botswana
- Height: 1.67 m (5 ft 5 1/2 in)
- Positions: Attacking midfielder; winger

Team information
- Current team: Township Rollers
- Number: 7

Senior career*
Years	Team	Apps	(Gls)
2007-2008	BMC		
2008-2010	Township Rollers		
2010-2012	Lincoln College		
2012-2014	South Florida Bulls	43	(10)
2014-	Township Rollers		

International career
2018-	Botswana	1	(0)
- * Club domestic league appearances and goals

Edwin Moalosi (born 26 October 1988) is a Motswana football player currently signed to Botswana Premier League club Township Rollers. He made his Botswana debut in 2018 against Lesotho.

== Club career ==
Moalosi first came to public attention as part of the BMC squad in the 2007-08 Botswana Premier League season. At the end of the season he joined Gaborone giants Township Rollers, where he spent two seasons before moving to the United States of America to pursue his studies. While abroad he represented a number of university football teams. Moalosi returned home in 2014 and rejoined Rollers

== International career ==
Edwin Moalosi made his international debut on 24 March 2018 in a friendly match against Lesotho by coming on as a 56th-minute substitute. He is yet to appear again for the Zebras.

== Honours ==
=== Club ===
Township Rollers

- Botswana Premier League:5

2009-10, 2015-16, 2016-17, 2017-18, 2018-19

- FA Cup:1

2009-10

- Mascom Top 8 Cup:1

2017-18

=== Individual honours ===
- Botswana FA Cup Player of the Tournament: 2010
- Botswana Premier League Supporters' Player of the Season: 2010
- Botswana Premier League Player of the Season: 2018
- Botswana Premier League Players' Player of the Season: 2018
