= Ivan Kamberipa =

Namibian footballer

Personal information
- Date of birth: 3 February 1994 (age 32)
- Place of birth: Okahandja, Namibia
- Height: 1.75 m (5 ft 9 in)
- Position: Left-back

Team information
- Current team: Orapa United

Senior career*
Years	Team	Apps	(Gls)
2012–2015	Rebels FC		
2015–2021	African Stars		
2021–2023	Masitaoka		
2023–	Orapa United	3	

International career^{‡}
2019–	Namibia	53	(2)
Medal record
Men's football
Representing Namibia
COSAFA Cup
Runner-up	2024 South Africa
- * Club domestic league appearances and goals ‡ National team caps and goals as of 16 June 2026

Ivan Kamberipa (born 3 February 1994), is a Namibian professional footballer who plays as a left-back for Orapa United and the Namibia national team.

== Career ==
Kamberipa began his senior career in the Namibia Premier League with Rebels FC in 2012. In 2015, he move to African Stars and in the 2017–18 season helped them win the Namibia Premier League and Namibia FA Cup. He moved to the Matswana club Masitaoka in 2021 where he became captain. In 2023, he moved to Orapa United.

== International ==
Kamberipa was first called up to the Namibia national team for the 2019 COSAFA Cup. He also made the final squad for the 2021 COSAFA Cup. He was called up to the national team for the 2023 Africa Cup of Nations.

== Career statistics ==
=== International ===
As of match played 9 October 2025

Appearances and goals by national team and year
National team	Year	Apps	Goals
Namibia	2019	9	0
Namibia	2021	11	0
Namibia	2022	4	0
Namibia	2023	6	0
Namibia	2024	16	1
Namibia	2025	7	1
Total		53	2

=== International goals ===
Scores and results list Namibia's goal tally first.

No.	Date	Venue	Opponent	Score	Result	Competition
1.	1 July 2024	Isaac Wolfson Stadium, Ibhayi, South Africa	Lesotho	1–0	2–1	2024 COSAFA Cup
2.	5 June 2025	Free State Stadium, Bloemfontein, South Africa	Angola	1–1	1–1	2025 COSAFA Cup

== Honours ==
African Stars

- Namibia Premier League: 2017–18
- Namibia FA Cup: 2018
