= Senzo Mazingiza =

Senzo Mbatha
- Born: Senzo Mazingiza; 11 May 1983 (age 43); Johannesburg, South Africa
- Other name: Senzo
- Citizenship: South African
- Occupation: Football Business Executive Sports Administrator
- Organization: Menza Group International.
- Known for: Business of Sports and Administration
- Notable work: FIFA 2010, Orlando Pirates F.C., Premier Soccer League, 2010 FIFA World Cup
- Website: www.menzagroupinternational.com

Senzo Mbatha is a South African sports executive. He was popularly known by his mother’s surname Mazingiza, which was later changed to his father’s surname Mbatha. He is the founder and owner of Menza Group International, a pan-African sports consulting firm with offices in South Africa, Tanzania, Ghana and Zambia. A former Management Consultant at the Botswana Football Association and CEO of the Botswana Premier League. A former Projecta Manager at the South African Premier Soccer League. He is a former Chief Executive Officer of both Yanga S.C. and Simba Sports Club in Tanzania. He also established himself extensively in South Africa, where he was an administrative manager and general manager at Platinum Stars, Bay United FC and the University of Pretoria FC. Mbatha has been involved in several clubs and international sporting events and most notably the FIFA Confederations Cup 2009 and FIFA World Cup 2010 as its Deputy Tournament Director. Mbatha holds an MBA qualification and has vast experience in the CAF Inter-club competitions the experience in understanding the requirements of the continental football.

== Football career ==
In 2010, Holder his football administration qualifications he then drives Premier soccer League (South Africa) as A Project Manager. After being General manager of the professional team of the University of Pretoria Football Club (South Africa), he joined the professional staff of PSL ticketing and security Committee in Premier League (South Africa). In 2017, he became the CAF 2017 Symposium delegate Director. In 2016, he was selected as a general manager at Platinum stars Football club, the African participate in three CAN (African Cup of Nations) successive, a real performance for the country in South Africa.

In 2010, he was selected to join the 2010 FIFA team and became deputy tournament director in 2010 FIFA World Cup Organizing Committee.

=== Simba S.C. and Yanga S.C. ===
In 2019, Mbatha became the Chief Executive Officer (CEO) of Simba S.C. and the 2017/18, 2018/19 and 2019/20 champions of the Tanzanian Premier League. The Tanzanian giants were ambitious and wanted to become one of the top 5 club teams in Africa. The South African Sports Administrator was hired to bring his experience in continental competitions and targeted winning the Champions League and International League (CAF). Mbatha guided Simba S.C. to the Tanzanian Premier League title in 2019/20 and reached the finals of the African Champions League. Mbatha resigned to continue as a CEO of Simba S.C and join with Yanga S.C, another soccer giants in Tanzania.

== Career ==
- 2010 FIFA World Cup (2009–2010)
- Premier Soccer League (2010–2012)
- Orlando Pirates F.C. (2011–2013)
- CAF 2017 (2017–2017)
- Simba Sports Club (2019 - 2020)
- Yanga S.C. (2020–present)
