= Benedict Vilakazi =

Benedict Vilakazi may refer to:

- Benedict Wallet Vilakazi (1906–1947), South African Zulu poet, novelist, and educator
- Benedict Vilakazi (footballer) (born 1982), South African association football player
