= 2025–26 Botswana Premier League =

Football league season

Botswana Premier League
- Season: 2025–26
- Dates: 15 August 2025 – 30 May 2026

The 2025–26 FNB Botswana Premier League season is the 48th season of the Botswana Premier League, the top-tier football league in Botswana, since its establishment in 1966. The season started on 15 August 2025. Gaborone United were the 2024-25 champions.

This season was the second of FNB's three year sponsorship of the league. At the end of the season, three teams will be relegated into either the Botswana First Division North or the Botswana First Division South.

== Teams ==
The league consisted of 16 teams; the top 13 teams from the previous season, and three teams promoted from the Botswana First Division North and Botswana First Division South.

=== Changes from previous season ===
Police XI won the 2024–25 First Division South, returning to the Premier League after one season away. Santa Green FC won the 2024–25 First Division North and Calendar Stars FC were promoted by play-off against Jwaneng Young Stars.

VTM FC sold their Premier League license to Black Lions.

==== Promotion and relegation ====
▲ Promoted from 2024–25 First Division	▼ Relegated to 2025–26 First Division
Santa Green FC; Police XI; Calendar Stars FC; Black Lions	Chadibe FC; Union Flamengo Santos; Security Systems

=== Stadiums and locations ===
Locations of teams in the 2024–25 Botswana Premier League

Club	City / Town	Position in 2024-25
Black Lions	Gaborone	Promoted
BDF XI	Gaborone	11th
Calendar Star	Francistown	Promoted
Extension Gunners	Lobatse	13th
Gaborone United	Gaborone	1st
Jwaneng Galaxy	Jwaneng	4th
Matebele FC	Matebeleng	12th
Mochudi Centre Chiefs	Mochudi	5th
Morupule Wanderers	Palapye	7th
Nico United	Selebi-Phikwe	10th
Orapa United	Orapa	8th
Police XI	Gaborone	Promoted
Santa Green	Mahalapye	Promoted
Sua Flamingoes	Sowa	3rd
TAFIC	Francistown	2nd
Township Rollers	Gaborone	6th

== League table ==
Pos	Team	Pld	W	D	L	GF	GA	GD	Pts	Qualification or relegation
1	Gaborone United (C, Q)	30	23	5	2	62	15	+47	74	Qualification for the 2026–27 CAF Champions League
2	Jwaneng Galaxy	30	17	8	5	55	23	+32	59	
3	Sua Flamingoes	30	18	5	7	44	30	+14	59	
4	Mochudi	30	16	8	6	37	18	+19	56	
5	Morupule Wanderers	30	14	5	11	41	33	+8	47	
6	Orapa United	30	12	11	7	35	30	+5	47	
7	Township Rollers	30	13	6	11	33	33	0	45	
8	Nico United	30	10	12	8	28	25	+3	42	
9	TAFIC	30	8	11	11	27	26	+1	35	
10	Matebele	30	8	9	13	29	37	−8	33	
11	Police XI	30	7	11	12	17	29	−12	32	
12	BDF XI	30	7	9	14	30	42	−12	30	
13	Extension Gunners	30	7	8	15	26	43	−17	29	
14	Black Lions (R)	30	7	6	17	17	38	−21	27	Relegation to First Division North or First Division South
15	Santa Green (R)	30	6	4	20	23	58	−35	22	Relegation to First Division North or First Division South
16	Calendar Star (R)	30	5	6	19	19	43	−24	21	Relegation to First Division North or First Division South

Source: Sofascore,flashscore,Soccerway
Rules for classification: 1) Points; 2) Goal difference; 3) Goals scored
(C) Champions; (Q) Qualified for the phase indicated; (R) Relegated
