= Thabang Sesinyi =

Motswana footballer

Personal information
- Date of birth: 15 October 1992 (age 34)
- Place of birth: Palapye, Botswana
- Height: 1.82 m (6 ft 0 in)
- Position: Midfielder

Team information
- Current team: Jwaneng Galaxy

Senior career*
Years	Team	Apps	(Gls)
2009–2010	Pilikwe United		
2010–2011	Matebejane		
2011–2013	Notwane		
2013–2016	Orapa United	23	(13)
2016–2017	Jwaneng Galaxy	20	(13)
2017–2018	Platinum Stars	5	(1)
2018–2019	Cape Umoya United	0	(0)
2019–	Jwaneng Galaxy	115	(81)

International career^{‡}
2016–	Botswana	39	(4)
- * Club domestic league appearances and goals ‡ National team caps and goals as of 6 February 2026

Thabang Sesinyi (born 15 October 1992) is a Motswana footballer who plays as a midfielder for Jwaneng Galaxy.

== Career statistics ==
=== Club ===
Club	Season	Division	League		Cup		Continental		Total	
Club	Season	Division	Apps	Goals	Apps	Goals	Apps	Goals	Apps	Goals
Orapa United	2015-16	Botswana Premier League	20	13					20	13
Jwaneng Galaxy	2016-17	Botswana Premier League	23	13					23	13
Jwaneng Galaxy	2019-20	Botswana Premier League	4	2					4	2
Jwaneng Galaxy	2021-22	Botswana Premier League	26	24			6	2	32	26
Jwaneng Galaxy	2022-23	Botswana Premier League	27	20	1	1			28	21
Jwaneng Galaxy	2023-24	Botswana Premier League	22	16	1	1	8	3	31	20
Jwaneng Galaxy	2024-25	Botswana Premier League	22	5					22	5
Jwaneng Galaxy	2025-26	Botswana Premier League	20	20			2	3	22	23
Jwaneng Galaxy	Total		144	100	2	2	16	8	162	110
Platinum Star	2017-18		5	1					5	1
Total career			169	114	2	2	16	8	187	124

=== International ===
As of match played 19 November 2024

Appearances and goals by national team and year
National team	Year	Apps	Goals
Botswana	2016	7	2
Botswana	2017	4	0
Botswana	2022	2	0
Botswana	2023	5	0
Botswana	2024	12	2
Total		30	4

Scores and results list Botswana's goal tally first, score column indicates score after each Sesinyi goal.

List of international goals scored by Thabang Sesinyi
No.	Date	Venue	Opponent	Score	Result	Competition	Ref.
1	4 September 2016	Stade du 4 Août, Ouagadougou, Burkina Faso	Burkina Faso	1–1	1–2	2017 Africa Cup of Nations qualification	
2	30 September 2016	Botswana National Stadium, Gaborone, Botswana	Angola	1–0	1–1	Friendly	
3	10 June 2024	Estádio do Zimpeto, Maputo, Mozambique	Somalia	1–0	3–1	2026 FIFA World Cup qualification	
4	15 October 2024	Obed Itani Chilume Stadium, Francistown, Botswana	Cape Verde	1–0	1–0	2025 Africa Cup of Nations qualification	

== Honours ==
Records

- All-time highest goalscorer of the Botswana Premier League: 102 goals
