= Mwampole Masule =

Motswana footballer

Personal information
- Date of birth: 14 August 1991 (age 35)
- Place of birth: Kasane, Botswana
- Height: 1.81 m (5 ft 11 in)
- Position: Goalkeeper

Senior career*
| Years | Team | Apps | (Gls) |
| 2007–2008 | Ferry Wanderers | | |
| 2008–2010 | Kazungula Young Fighters | | |
| 2010–2019 | Township Rollers | | |
| 2019 | Chippa United | 0 | (0) |
| 2019 | Orapa United | | |

International career
| 2014–2018 | Botswana | 20 | (0) |
- * Club domestic league appearances and goals

Mwampole Masule (born 14 August 1991) is a Motswana professional footballer who plays as a goalkeeper for the Botswana national team and is currently a free agent. He last played for Botswana Premier League club Orapa United.

Mwampole began his career with Division One side Ferry Wanderers in 2007 before moving to Kazungula Young Fighters the following season. Soon after he was signed by Botswana Premier League giants Township Rollers, immediately helping them win the double. Masule stayed nine years with the Gaborone-based club, winning seven league titles, one FA Cup and two Mascom Top 8 cups. He signed for South African outfit Chippa United in the middle of the 2018–19 season but was released less than six months later without making a single appearance for the club. Masule then returned to the Botswana Premier League with Orapa United but was again released. He has been without a club since.

== International career ==
Masule made his debut on 5 March 2014 under Peter Butler in a friendly against South Sudan, which Botswana went on to win 3–0.

== Honours ==
=== Club ===
Township Rollers

- Botswana Premier League:7

2009-10, 2010-11, 2013-14, 2015-16, 2016-17, 2017-18, 2018-19

- Botswana FA Cup:1

2010

- Mascom Top 8 Cup:1

2017-18

=== Individual ===
- Botswana Premier League Player of the Season: 2014
- Botswana Premier League Supporters' Player of the Season: 2014
- Mascom Top 8 Cup Goalkeeper of the Tournament: 2014
