= Boiki Mothibi =

Motswana footballer

Personal information
- Full name: Boiki Mothibi
- Place of birth: Botswana
- Position: Striker

Senior career*
Years	Team	Apps	(Gls)
2004–2006	Mogoditshane Fighters		
2006–2007	Lobtrans Gunners		

International career
2004	Botswana	1	(0)
- * Club domestic league appearances and goals

Boiki Mothibi is a Motswana former footballer who played as a striker. He won one cap for the Botswana national football team in 2004.
