= Nikola Kavazović =

Serbian football coach (born 1975)

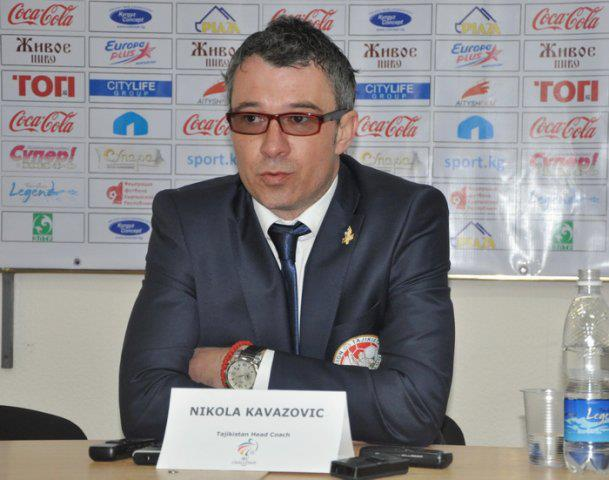

Personal information
- Date of birth: 29 July 1975 (age 51)
- Place of birth: Belgrade, SFR Yugoslavia
- Height: 1.77 m (5 ft 10 in)
- Position: Midfielder

Team information
- Current team: (manager)

Senior career*
Years	Team	Apps	(Gls)
1985–1993	OFK Beograd		
1993–1995	BASK		

Managerial career
- 1996–2005: BASK
- 2006–2008: Žarkovo
- 2008–2010: Borac Banja Luka
- 2010–2012: Resnik
- 2012–2013: FC Istiklol
- 2012–2013: Tajikistan
- 2014–2015: Sri Lanka
- 2015: New Radiant
- 2016: Lanexang United
- 2016: New Radiant
- 2016–2017: Saif
- 2017–2018: Township Rollers
- 2018: Leopards
- 2018–2019: Free State Stars
- 2020: Jwaneng Galaxy
- 2020-2021: Township Rollers
- 2022: Liptovský Hrádok
- 2023: Sua Flamingoes
- 2023: Ethiopian Coffee
- 2024: Vipers
- 2024-2025: Sua Flamingoes
- * Club domestic league appearances and goals

Nikola Kavazović (Serbian Cyrillic: Никола Кавазовић; born 29 July 1975) is a Serbian professional football coach who is the current manager of Vipers.

Kavazović is the former Tajikistan national football team head coach (2012 - 2013), and also former head coach of Tajikistan champions FC Istiklol. As head coach of Istiklol, Kavazović won AFC Presidents Cup 2012. Kavazović successfully completed UEFA "A" license, and enrolled on UEFA "PRO" license in Football Federation of Bosnia and Hercegovina. In July 2012, he was the youngest national team head coach in the world, aged 36.

== Career ==
=== Serbia ===
Kavazović started coaching job in 1996. in BASK, as youth coach. Besides BASK, Kavazović worked as youth and senior coach in BSK, Zarkovo, Borac and Resnik.

In 1998, Kavazović graduated from Belgrade Sports University as youngest high educated football coach in FR Yugoslavia.

=== FC Istiklol ===
In January 2012, Kavazović moved to Asia, Tajikistan, and become FC Istiklol head coach. In his first season, Istiklol won Tajikistan Supercup and AFC Presidents Cup. Also, they won silver medal in Tajikistan elite league, and lost Tajikistan Cup finals against Regar Tad Az after penalty series (8:7).

In his second season, Istiklol finished first part of season with record of 8 wins, 0 draws and one defeat. After 8 straight wins, Istiklol lost away game to Champions Ravshan Kulob (1:0), and Kavazović was sacked day after, on 17 June 2013.

=== Tajikistan ===
In July 2012, Kavazović got offer to become Tajikistan national head coach. On his debut, Tajikistan beat Qatar in Munich (Germany) 2:1. Also, under him, Tajikistan won Pakistan (1:0), Macau (3:0), Afghanistan (3:2) and India (3:0), and lost to Iran (6:1) and Kyrgyzstan (1:0).

=== Sri Lanka ===
On 5 June 2014, Kavazović was appointed as the head coach of the Sri Lanka national football team. On his debut, on 24 August 2014, Sri Lanka beat the Seychelles national team in Mahé, by two goals to one. This was the first away victory for Sri Lanka after 15 years.

=== New Radiant SC ===
On 12 September 2015, Kavazović was appointed head coach of the Maldivian champions New Radiant SC. Kavazović took over the team after Maldives Cup finals, which New Radiant SC lost to biggest rivals Mazia. In 12 games under Kavazović, New Radiant SC won 9 games, 2 draw and lost one game, and won fifth champions title in club's history.

=== Lanexang United ===
After Champions title in Maldives Dhivehi Premier League and securing AFC Cup group stage participation for New Radiant SC, Kavazović decided not to extend contract. Attracted with great new project of Laos football, Kavazović accepted offer from Lanexang United F.C. and become their Head coach on 2 January 2016. After 7 consecutive wins on beginning of season, Kavazović was appointed as Laos national team head coach for friendly game against Cambodia. Under mysterious circumstances, Kavazović left Cambodia night before game and resign on both posts. He and his family left Laos on 2 April 2016, just 3 days after arrival from Cambodia.

=== Saif Sporting Club ===
On 21 September, Kavazović was appointed as new head coach of Saif Sporting Club. During preparations for the new season, in India, Kavazović resigned after the decision was made to join Township Rollers from Botswana.

=== Township Rollers ===
Ahead of the 2017-18 season, Kavazović was appointed as the new manager of Township Rollers in Botswana. In first season in Africa, Kavazović won "double", both and Botswana Premier League and Mascom Top 8 Cup in Botswana. Besides local achievements, under Kavazović, Township Rollers became first ever club from Botswana who qualified for group stages of CAF Champions League.

In first half of 2017-18 campaign, Kavazović broke two all time records: 1) 8 consecutive wins and maximal 24 points after 8 opening games - all time Botswana Premier League record.

2) 33 points (10W, 3D, 0L) after 13 opening games - all time Township Rollers record. Also, Kavazović finished 2017. with personal record, unbeaten run of 42 consecutive games as a head coach of New Radiant SC, Lanexang United, Saif SC and Township Rollers.

On 3 March 2018, Township Rollers won Mascom Top 8 Cup, and that was their first trophy under Kavazović. Botswana Champion defeated Orapa United 4:2 (2:0), and that was their first won Mascom Top 8 Cup since 2012.

On 21 February, Township Rollers qualified to 2nd round of qualifications for CAF Champions League, and they became first team in history of Botswana football who reached last qualification round for elite African clubs competition. Under Kavazović, Botswana champion won Al-Merreikh from Sudan, at that moment officially 5th ranked club in Africa - 4:2 in aggregate (3:0. 1:2).

On 11 March 2018, Township Rollers became first ever club from Botswana in CAF Champions League group stage. Kavazović's team won Young Africans SC from Tanzania - 2:1 in aggregate (2:1, 0:0), and on 21 March in Cairo (Egypt) they were drawn in Group A with Al-Ahly (Egypt), Esperance de Tunis and KCCA (Uganda).

On 4 May 2018, in their first ever game of CAF Champions League group stage, Township Rollers won KCCA from Uganda 1:0.

Kavazović resigned from post of head coach in Township Rollers on 16 October 2018, leaving them as log leaders with record 6W, 1D, 0L, and goal difference 15:2.

=== A.F.C. Leopards ===
Ahead of the 2018-19 season, Kavazović was appointed as the new manager of A.F.C. Leopards in Kenya.

== Managerial statistics ==
Team	Nat.	From	To	P	W	D	L	GS	GA	%W	Honours
Istiqlol	(Tajikistan)	January 2012	June 2013	46	36	6	4	129	22	78.26	AFC Presidents Cup; Tajik Supercup
Tajikistan	(Tajikistan)	July 2012	June 2013	7	5	0	2	14	10	71.43	
Sri Lanka	(Sri Lanka)	June 2014	June 2015	11	1	2	8	6	27	9.09	
New Radiant	(Maldives)	October 2015	December 2015	12	9	2	1	26	11	75.00	Dhivehi Premier League
Lanexang United F.C.	(Laos)	January 2016	April 2016	7	7	0	0	32	6	100.00	
Saif Sporting Club	(Bangladesh)	September 2016	April 2017	16	9	7	0	29	13	56.25	Bangladesh Championship League
Township Rollers	(Botswana)	June 2017	October 2018	52	33	10	9	90	47	63.46	Botswana Premier League; Mascom Top 8 Cup

P – Total of played matches W – Won matches D – Drawn matches L – Lost matches GS – Goal scored GA – Goals against
%W – Percentage of matches won
