= Bechuanaland Union African Soccer League =

Former professional football league in present-day Botswana

- Organising body: South Africa African Football Association
- Founded: 1949
- Folded: 1977
- Country: Botswana
- Other club from: South Africa
- Level on pyramid: 1 (1949–1977)
- Domestic cup: Moroka-Baloyi Cup

The Bechuanaland Union African Soccer League is a former professional football league which from 1949 to 1977 served as the top tier division in the Botswana football league system. The league was created as a merger of the Southern Protectorate League, Northern Protectorate League, Mafikeng Football Association and Western Transvaal League, which had been contested since the 1930s. It was abolished following the creation of a nationwide league, later called the Botswana Premier League, in 1978.

== Format ==
The Bechuanaland Union African Soccer League was split into north and southern mini-leagues based on geographical location. Teams played each other twice in a double round-robin format. At the end of the campaign, which began in February and ended in November, the teams with the most points were crowned champion of their respective leagues and faced off in a one-legged playoff to determine the national champions, much like most South American leagues.
