= David Bright (football manager) =

Motswana football coach (1956–2021)

Personal information
- Date of birth: 13 June 1956
- Place of birth: Botswana
- Date of death: 25 January 2021 (aged 64)
- Place of death: Gaborone

Managerial career
- Years: Team
- 1992–2005: Mogoditshane Fighters
- 1997–1998: Botswana
- 1999: Botswana
- 2000: Botswana
- 2008–2009: Engen Santos
- 2014–2015: Cape Town
- 2017–2019: Botswana

David Bright (13 June 1956 – 25 January 2021) was a Motswana football coach.

== Biography ==
He was considered to be one of Botswana’s most successful coaches. A former army major, Bright was often referred to by his former military rank.

On 5 February 1992, Bright joined Mogoditshane Fighters in the Botswana First Division. During his 13 year spell, he led the team to three consecutive Botswana Premier League titles between 1999 and 2001.

Bright has also managed Engen Santos, Bay United, Gaborone United and Bay United.

He began his fourth spell in charge of the national team in July 2017, but was sacked on 19 February 2019, following an unsuccessful 2019 Africa Cup of Nations qualification campaign.

Following a visit to South Africa, Bright died at the age of 64 from complications related to COVID-19.
