= Benedict Vilakazi (soccer) =

South African soccer player (born 1982)

Personal information
- Full name: Benedict Bongani Vilakazi
- Date of birth: 8 September 1982 (age 44)
- Place of birth: Soweto, South Africa
- Height: 1.57 m (5 ft 2 in)
- Position: Midfielder

Youth career
- Diepkloof Hellenic
- Orlando Pirates

Senior career*
Years	Team	Apps	(Gls)
1999–2007	Orlando Pirates	170	(58)
2007–2008	AaB Aalborg	5	(0)
2008–2011	Mamelodi Sundowns	37	(4)
2011	→ Mpumalanga Black Aces (loan)	9	(0)
2011–2012	Black Leopards	4	(0)
2013	Malanti Chiefs		
2013	Notwane FC		
2013–2014	Botswana Meat Commission		

International career^{‡}
2002–2007	South Africa	31	(2)
- * Club domestic league appearances and goals as of 19 June 2012 ‡ National team caps and goals as of 19 June 2011

Benedict Vilakazi (born 9 August 1982) is a South African former soccer player who played as a midfielder. He was noted as one of the smallest professional international footballers during his time (standing at a mere 1.57 m) but made up for this with a strong physical presence.

He was born in Diepkloof, Soweto and is nicknamed "Tso" and "Little Napoleon" due to his leading skills.

== Career ==
Vilakazi played for South Africa at the 2006 African Nations Cup in Egypt. His professional career was rocked by sex scandals with juveniles including being dragged to court on allegation of statutory rape. He was however acquitted of the charge as it was alleged that it was with consent. The complainant has since given birth to his son. He publicly apologised to soccer fans after his acquittal. The sex scandal also prohibited him going through with his move to the Swedish side Djurgården that was supposed to go through right before the scandal hit.

On 27 July 2007, he was transferred to Danish Superliga club Aalborg BK. He was given a 5-year contract. Due to sickness he had not adjusted to the European style of football, and therefore he played only a few games in the Danish league. Vilakazi returned to South Africa July 2008, signing a contract with Pretoria-based Mamelodi Sundowns, where he was also joined by former FC Copenhagen striker Sibusiso Zuma. After not making an impact at Sundowns, Vilakazi was loaned out to Mpumalanga Black Aces for the 2010–11 PSL season. However, Vilakazi had a fallout with Black Aces' management due to missing several training sessions and other disciplinary problems. Consequently, the Sundowns did not renew his contract after its expiration at the end of the 2010–11 season.

Vilakazi had short spells at Black Leopards and in Swaziland with Malanti Chiefs before moving to Botswana Premier League team Notwane FC in July 2013. In November 2013, he terminated his contract with Notwane after not receiving his salary and signing-on fee, and joined Botswana Meat Commission on a one-year contract., Tso remains the highest scorer of all time for Orlando Pirates, with 52 goals.

Tso had a stint as the head coach of Orange Vaal Professionals, a team campaigning in the ABC Motsepe league, the 3rd tier of South African Football.
