= 2020–21 Botswana Premier League =

Botswana Premier League
- Season: 2020–21

The 2020–21 Botswana Premier League was due to be the 56th season of the Botswana Premier League, the top-tier football league in Botswana, since its establishment in 1966.

It was suspended by the Botswana Football Association due to the COVID-19 pandemic in Botswana.

The competition was later officially cancelled.
