= Jorge Duarte =

Portuguese football manager

Jorge Miguel Costa Duarte, known in some African countries as Miguel da Costa, is a Portuguese football manager who is last known to have managed Al-Ittihad (Tripoli).

== Early life ==
Duarte started playing football at a young age. As a youth player, Duarte joined the youth academy of Portuguese side Porto. After suffering an injury, he started his managerial career.

== Managerial career ==
In Africa, Duarte is known as Miguel da Costa. In 2017, Duarte was appointed manager of Ugandan side Vipers. He helped them win the league. However, the club's style of play under him was regarded as unattractive. In 2018, he departed the club.

After that, he was appointed manager of Botswanan side Jwaneng Galaxy. He was tasked by the club to win the league. He helped the club win their first league title. After that, he was appointed manager of Libyan side Al-Ittihad (Tripoli). He holds a UEFA B coaching license.
