= Naughty Boys FC =

Association football club in Lesotho

Naughty Boys Football Club is a football club based in Maseru, Lesotho. The club currently competes in the Lesotho Premier League, the Lesotho top flight.

== History ==
Naughty Boys were founded in 1999 in Maseru, the capital of Lesotho.

In 2007, Naughty Boys achieved promotion from the Lesotho second tier to the Lesotho Premier League. During the 2007/08 Lesotho Premier League season, the club finished twelfth out of sixteen clubs. However, during the 2008/09 season, the club were relegated from the Lesotho Premier League to the Lesotho second tier. Naughty Boys then temporarily reverted to their previous name, Melele.

After one week of voting for which teams would compete in the 2009 Vodacom Soccer Spectacular, Naughty Boys were top of the votes with 2648 votes despite competing in the Lesotho second tier, but the club eventually did not participate in the 2009 Vodacom Soccer Spectacular.

During the 2021/22 season, Naughty Boys reached the second tier Top 8 Championship playoffs. Despite finishing second that season, Naughty Boys were then promoted due to Lesotho Premier League club Kick 4 Life withdrawing from the Lesotho Premier League, but the Naughty Boys squad for the 2022/23 Lesotho Premier League was composed of second tier level players, because the transfer window was closed by the time they were promoted.

Naughty Boys has received attention from foreign media because of the name of their club.
