= 2018 Namibia FA Cup =

Tournament details
- Country: Namibia

Final positions
- Champions: African Stars

The 2018 Debmarine Namibia Cup is the 25th edition of the Namibia FA Cup, the knockout football competition of Namibia.

== Round of 32 ==
[Mar 24, Etosha Stadium, Tsumeb]

Swakopmund FC 5-1 Ohangwena NAMPOL

Once Again w/o Rhino FC [Rhino FC withdrew]

Space Age 0-3 Khomas NAMPOL

Khuse 0-0 Tigers [4-2 pen]

[Mar 24, Sam Nujoma Stadium, Windhoek]

Real Fighters 0-11 Eleven Arrows

Omaheke NAMPOL 0-12 African Stars

Citizens 2-2 Young Chiefs [5-6 pen]

[Mar 25, Etosha Stadium, Tsumeb]

Rundu Chiefs 0-2 Civics

Chief Santos 4-0 Reho Madrid

Blue Waters 4-0 Fresh United

Orlando Pirates 3-1 Outjo Academy

Eastern Chiefs 2-7 UNAM

Dynamos 1-1 Onathinge United [5-4 pen]

Golden Bees 1-1 Life Fighters [4-3 pen]

[Mar 25, Sam Nujoma Stadium, Windhoek]

Tura Magic 0-0 Mighty Gunners [5-4 pen]

Black Africa 2-2 Young African [10-9 pen]

== Round of 16 ==
[Apr 21, Kuisebmond Stadium, Walvis Bay]

Tura Magic 9-1 Swakopmund FC

Khuse 1-1 Black Africa [0-2 pen]

Blue Waters 2-1 Young Chiefs

Eleven Arrows 1-1 Orlando Pirates [4-3 pen]

[Apr 21, Sam Nujoma Stadium, Windhoek]

Khomas NAMPOL 0-0 Golden Bees [4-5 pen]

Once Again 1-10 Civics

African Stars 6-0 Dynamos

Chief Santos 0-4 UNAM

== Quarterfinals ==
[Apr 27, Sam Nujoma Stadium, Windhoek]

Civics 1-1 Tura Magic [4-3 pen]

[Apr 28, Sam Nujoma Stadium, Windhoek]

Golden Bees 1-4 Black Africa

UNAM 2-0 Blue Waters

Eleven Arrows 0-0 African Stars [4-5 pen]

== Semifinals ==
[May 12, Sam Nujoma Stadium, Windhoek]

Black Africa 1-1 UNAM [aet, 3-5 pen]

Civics 1-2 African Stars [aet]

== Final ==
[May 19, Sam Nujoma Stadium, Windhoek]

UNAM 0-1 African Stars

== See also ==
- 2017–18 Namibia Premier League
