= Vubachikwe =

Coordinates: 20°52′55″S 28°55′25″E

Location of Vumbachigwe Mine

Vumbachigwe is a village and a goldmine in Gwanda District, in the province of Matabeleland South, Zimbabwe. It is located along the Mtshabezi River about ten kilometres (6.2 mi) north-west of the town of Gwanda. According to the 1982 Population Census, the village had a population of 2,077. The village grew as the residential and commercial centre for the employees of the Vubachikwe gold mine.

== Gold Mine ==
The Vubachikwe Mine, also known as Mining Lease 16, is a gold mine which has been operated by Forbes & Thompson (Bulawayo) (Pvt) Ltd since 1983. The area has supported commercial gold mining since the late 1800s, and the archaeology supports earlier gold mining there, both placer and underground.

The gold bearing ore bodies are located in the banded iron formations of the Gwanda Greenstone Belt.
