= Matebele FC =

- Full name: Matebele Football Club
- Nickname: Kuka Ntsu
- Founded: 2021; 5 years ago
- Ground: The Nest; Matebeleng, Botswana
- Capacity: 500
- Owner: Lame Makache
- League: Botswana Premier League
- 2025–26: 10th

Matebele FC is a Botswanan football club based in Matebeleng, Kgatleng District that currently competes in the Botswana Premier League.

== Stadium ==
Matebele FC plays its home matches at its own stadium, The Nest, in Matebeleng.

== History ==
Matebele FC was founded in 2021 after former First Division South club Masters Blackpool FC was purchased and dissolved. Matebele FC was formed and took the club's place in the league. There was some backlash from fans as Lame Makache converted the club from a society to a business entity during the acquisition and rebranding process in order to meet licensing requirements. During its first season under the Matebele FC name, the club finished fourth in the league and reached the semi-finals of the Botswana FA Challenge Cup before falling 1–2 to Gaborone United.

In May 2023, the club clinched promotion to the Botswana Premier League for the first time for the 2023–24 season by winning the First Division South. In preparation for the season and its first top-flight match on 19 September 2023 against Police XI, the club held a training camp in neighboring Namibia and participated in a tournament also featuring five clubs from the Namibia Premiership.

== Domestic history ==
Key

Champion Runners-up 3rd Place

Season	League										Domestic Cup	Notes
Season	Div.	Pos.	Pl.	W	D	L	GF	GA	GD	P	Domestic Cup	Notes
2023/2024	1st	11th	30	7	11	12	32	36	-4	32		
