= Masitaoka FC =

Masitaoka
- Full name: Masitaoka Football Club
- Nickname: Majatlhaga (Up The Blues)
- Founded: 1968
- Ground: Molepolole Stadium; Molepolole, Botswana
- Capacity: 6,600
- Manager: Manda Mpofu
- League: Botswana Premier League
- Website: https://www.masitaokafc.co.bw/

Masitaoka FC is a Botswanan professional football club based in Gaborone that currently competes in the Botswana Premier League.

== History ==
The club was founded in 1962 but not officially registered with the Botswana Football Association until 1968. It was originally based in Molepolole but has since relocated to the capital Gaborone, although the club still plays its home matches at Molepolole Stadium. The club is named after the Bakwena Tribe regiment, Masitaoka of 1906. It gained promotion to the Botswana Premier League for the first time for the 2020–21 season.
