= Botswana Football Association =

Botswana national Football Association

CAF
- Short name: BFA
- Founded: 1966
- Headquarters: Gaborone
- FIFA affiliation: 1978
- CAF affiliation: 1976
- President: Maclean Letshwiti
- Website: http://www.bfa.co.bw/

The Botswana Football Association (BFA) is the governing body of association football in Botswana, and controls the national football team. It is an affiliate of FIFA, CAF and the COSAFA.

National football leagues include the Botswana Premier League, Botswana First Division North and Botswana First Division South.

== History ==
In 1966, the Botswana National Football Association (BNFA) was created, before the name was changed in 1970 and the BFA officially founded. It was first affiliated to the CAF in 1976, and then with FIFA in 1978. On 24 October 2023, Gaborone — Botswana Football Association (BFA) has parted ways with Zebras coach Mogomotsi Mpote. According to sources, the BFA is eyeing an Arab coach with expectation that he will help the Zebras to qualify for both AFCON and 2026 World Cup.
