= Botswana Premier League =

Top division association football league in Botswana

- Organising body: Botswana Football League
- Founded: 1978; 48 years ago
- Country: Botswana
- Confederation: CAF
- Number of clubs: 16
- Level on pyramid: 1
- Relegation to: Debswana First Division North and Debswana First Division South
- Domestic cup: FA Challenge Cup
- League cup: Mascom Top 8 Cup
- International cup(s): Champions League; Confederation Cup
- Current champions: Gaborone United (9th title) (2025–26)
- Most championships: Township Rollers (16 titles)
- Top scorer: Thabang Sesinyi (113 goals)
- Broadcaster: BTV

The Botswana Premier League is the highest level football league in Botswana. Organised by the Botswana Football Association, the league was formed in 1978 to replace the pre-independence Bechuanaland Union African Soccer League, which was regional. Participants in the first edition of the league included Tlokweng Pirates, Notwane, Black Peril, Queens Park Rangers and a team from Ngwaketse district.

The league has been dominated by teams from the southern part of the country. In the 2006–07 season, Ecco City Greens became the first team from the north to lift the competition.

== Sponsorship ==
Since the 1980s, the Botswana Premier League has had title sponsors. The list below details who the sponsors were and what they called the league:

Period	Sponsor	Name	Reference
1991 to 2001	Kgalagadi Breweries Limited	Castle Super League	
2002 to 2005	Kgalagadi Breweries Limited	St Louis Premiership	
2006 to 2008	Mascom	Mascom Premiership	
2009 to 2014	Botswana Telecommunications Corporation	be Mobile Premiership	
2014 to 2020	Botswana Telecommunications Corporation	BTC Premiership	
2024 to present	FNB Botswana	Botswana Premier League	

== Format ==
During the league, from August to May, each club plays each of the other teams twice; once at home and once away, totaling 30 games for each team by the end of the season. Therefore, in Botswana football a true round-robin format is used. In the first half of the season, each team plays once against each league opponent, for a total of 15 games. In the second half of the season, the teams play in exactly the same order that they did in the first half of the season, the only difference being that home and away situations are switched. Since the 1994–95 season, teams were awarded three points for a win, one point for a draw, and no points for a loss. Since Botswana is lowly ranked in the CAF rankings only one CAF Champions League spot is awarded to the league champions. The cup winners gain a spot in the CAF Confederation Cup.

Since the 2005–06 season if two or more teams end the league with the same number of points, the deciding tie-breakers used are (in order):

1. Head-to-head records;
2. Goal difference of head-to-head records;
3. Goal difference of league;
4. Most goals for in league;
5. Draw

== Broadcasting rights ==
Starting from 2002–03 until 2012–13 the broadcasting rights were held by the state broadcaster Botswana Television (BTV) and its radio partner Radio Botswana (RB1). P5 million per season were paid for the rights. Broadcasting of the games was irregular as the TV showed majority of games played in and around Gaborone citing poor quality stadiums in the north. Two weekend games are shown live on TV, with midweek games being delayed.

=== SuperSport deal ===
In 2013 there was major excitement when South African broadcasting giant entered the local market. The deal saw the state broadcaster temporarily losing the rights, as a few games were shown on pay-per-view. However it was short lived as SuperSport and the BFA parted their ways. Broadcasting resumed normally on BTV and RB1.

== Champions ==
Previous champions are:

Years	Winner	Manager
1966	Unknown	
1967	Gaborone United (1)	
1968	Champion unknown	
1969	Gaborone United (2)	
1970	Gaborone United (3)	
1971–1977	Champions unknown	
1978	Notwane FC (1)	
1979	Township Rollers (1)	(Zaire) Chibaso Kande
1980	Township Rollers (2)	(Zaire) Chibaso Kande
1981	Botswana Defence Force XI (1)	
1982	Township Rollers (3)	(Zaire) Chibaso Kande
1983	Township Rollers (4)	(Zaire) Chibaso Kande
1984	Township Rollers (5)	(Zaire) Chibaso Kande
1985	Township Rollers (6)	(Zaire) Chibaso Kande
1986	Gaborone United (4)	(South Africa) Thomas Johnson
1987	Township Rollers (7)	(Zimbabwe) Ezekiel Mpofu
1988	Botswana Defence Force XI (2)	
1989	Botswana Defence Force XI (3)	
1990	Gaborone United (5)	(England) Arthur James
1991	Botswana Defence Force XI (4)	
1992	LCS Extension Gunners (1)	
1993	LCS Extension Gunners (2)	
1994	LCS Extension Gunners (3)	
1995	Township Rollers (8)	
1996	Notwane FC (2)	
1997	Botswana Defence Force XI (5)	
1998	Notwane FC (3)	(Zimbabwe) Paul Moyo
1999	Mogoditshane Fighters (1)	(Botswana) David Bright
2000	Mogoditshane Fighters (2)	(Botswana) David Bright
2001	Mogoditshane Fighters (3)	(Botswana) David Bright
2002	Botswana Defence Force XI (6)	
2003	Mogoditshane Fighters (4)	
2004	Botswana Defence Force XI (7)	
2004–05	Township Rollers (9)	(Botswana) Banks Panene
2005–06	Police XI SC (1)	(Botswana) Sthandwa Mogwadi
2006–07	ECCO City Green (1)	
2007–08	Mochudi Centre Chiefs (1)	(Zambia) Beston Chambeshi
2008–09	Gaborone United (6)	(Zambia) Mike Sithole
2009–10	Township Rollers (10)	(Zimbabwe) Rahman Gumbo
2010–11	Township Rollers (11)	(Zambia) Wesley Mondo
2011–12	Mochudi Centre Chiefs (2)	(Zimbabwe) Madinda Ndlovu
2012–13	Mochudi Centre Chiefs (3)	(Zimbabwe) Madinda Ndlovu
2013–14	Township Rollers (12)	(Zimbabwe) Madinda Ndlovu
2014–15	Mochudo Centre Chiefs (4)	
2015–16	Township Rollers (13)	(England) Mark Harrison
2016–17	Township Rollers (14)	(Botswana) Mogomotsi Mpote
2017–18	Township Rollers (15)	(Serbia) Nikola Kavazovic
2018–19	Township Rollers (16)	(Argentina) Rodolfo Zapata
2019–20	Jwaneng Galaxy FC (1)	(Portugal) Miguel da Costa
2020–21	Not finished	
2021–22	Gaborone United (7)	(Botswana) Innocent Morapedi
2022–23	Jwaneng Galaxy FC (2)	(South Africa) Morena Ramoreboli
2023–24	Jwaneng Galaxy FC (3)	(South Africa) Morena Ramoreboli
2024–25	Gaborone United (8)	(Bulgaria) Dimitar Pantev
2025–26	Gaborone United (9)	(Northern Ireland) Sean Connor

== Qualification for CAF competitions ==
=== Association ranking for the 2025–26 CAF club season ===
The association ranking for the 2025–26 CAF Champions League and the 2025–26 CAF Confederation Cup will be based on results from each CAF club competition from 2020–21 to the 2024–25 season.

Legend

- CL: CAF Champions League
- CC: CAF Confederation Cup
- ≥: Associations points might increase on basis of its clubs performance in 2024–25 CAF club competitions
- Associations ranked 1–12 are eligible to enter two teams in each CAF club competition.

Rank			Association	2020–21 (× 1)		2021–22 (× 2)		2022–23 (× 3)		2023–24 (× 4)		2024–25 (× 5)		Total
2025	2024	Mvt	Association	CL	CC	CL	CC	CL	CC	CL	CC	CL	CC	Total
1	1	—	Egypt	8	3	7	4	8	2.5	7	7	10	4	190.5
2	2	—	Morocco	4	6	9	5	8	2	2	4	5	5	142
3	4	+1	South Africa	8	2	5	4	4	3	4	1.5	9	3	131
4	3	-1	Algeria	6	5	7	1	6	5	2	3	5	5	130
5	6	+1	Tanzania	3	0.5	0	2	3	4	6	0	2	4	82.5
6	5	-1	Tunisia	4	3	5	1	4	2	6	1	3	0.5	82.5
7	8	+1	Angola	1	0	5	0	2	0	3	1.5	2	2	55
8	7	-1	DR Congo	4	0	0	3	1	2	4	0	2	0	45
9	9	—	Sudan	3	0	3	0	3	0	2	0	3	0	41
10	11	+1	Ivory Coast	0	0	0	1	0	3	3	0	1	2	38
11	10	-1	Libya	0	0.5	0	5	0	0.5	0	3	0	0	24
12	12	—	Nigeria	0	2	0	0	0	2	0	2	0	1	21
13	15	+2	Mali	0	0	0	0	0	1	0	2	1	0.5	18.5
14	14	—	Ghana	0	0	0	0	0	0	1	3	0	0	16
15	13	-2	Guinea	2	0	1	0	2	0	0	0.5	0	0	12
16	19	+3	Botswana	0	0	1	0	0	0	1	0	0	0.5	8.5
17	21	+4	Senegal	1	2	0	0	0	0	0	0	0	1	8
18	17	-1	Mauritania	0	0	0	0	0	0	2	0	0	0	8
19	18	-1	Congo	0	0	0	1	0	1	0	0.5	0	0	7
20	16	-4	Cameroon	0	3	0	0.5	1	0	0	0	0	0	7
21	22	+1	Togo	0	0	0	0	0	1	0	0	0	0	3
22	22	—	Uganda	0	0	0	0	1	0	0	0	0	0	3
23	-	new	Mozambique	0	0	0	0	0	0	0	0	0	0.5	2.5
24	20	-4	Zambia	0	1.5	0	0.5	0	0	0	0	0	0	2.5
25	24	-1	Eswatini	0	0	0	0.5	0	0	0	0	0	0	1
25	24	-1	Niger	0	0	0	0.5	0	0	0	0	0	0	1
27	26	-1	Burkina Faso	0	0.5	0	0	0	0	0	0	0	0	0.5

== Past seasons ==
Season	Winner	Runner-up	Relegated at end of season	Promoted at end of season
1978	Notwane			
1979	Township Rollers			
1980	Township Rollers			
1981	BDF XI	Extension Gunners		
1982	Township Rollers			
1983	Township Rollers			
1984	Township Rollers			
1985	Township Rollers			
1986	Gaborone United			
1987	Township Rollers			
1988	BDF XI	Extension Gunners	Copper Chiefs; Kanye Swallows	Tlokweng Pirates; Uniao Flamengo Santos
1989	BDF XI			
1990	Gaborone United	Mochudi Centre Chiefs	Nico United	
1991	BDF XI			
1992	LCS Gunners	TAFIC	Jwaneng Comets	Mogoditshane Fighters
1993	LCS Gunners	Gaborone United	Mogoditshane Fighters; Prisons XI	Jwaneng Comets
1994	LCS Gunners	Township Rollers	Prisons XI; Wonder Sporting	Mochudi Centre Chiefs; Jwaneng Comets
1995	Township Rollers			
1996	Notwane PG	Mochudi Centre Chiefs	TASC; Boteti Young Fighters	Mogoditshane Fighters; TAFIC
1997	BDF XI	Gaborone United	BMC; Nico United	Mokgosi Young Fighters; TASC
1998	Notwane	BDF XI	TASC; Mokgosi Young Fighters	Satmos; Jwaneng Comets
1998–99	Mogoditshane Fighters	BDF XI	No relegation	
1999–2000	Mogoditshane Fighters	Mochudi Centre Chiefs	Gaborone United; Prisons XI	Botswana Meat Commission; TASC
2000–01	Mogoditshane Fighters	BDF XI	Botswana Meat Commission; Satmos	
2001–02	BDF XI	Mogoditshane Fighters	Nico United; Township Rollers	
2002–03	Mogoditshane Fighters	Police XI		
2003–04	BDF XI	Police XI	Wonder Sporting; Mochudi Center Chiefs	Nico United; Gabane Santos
2004–05	Township Rollers	Police XI	Uniao Flamengo Santos; TAFIC; Orapa Wanderers	Naughty Boys
2005–06	Police XI	BDF XI	Mogoditshane Fighters; Naughty Boys; Mosquito	Jwaneng Comets
2006–07	ECCO City Greens	Mochudi Centre Chiefs	Prisons XI; Satmos	
2007–08	Mochudi Centre Chiefs	Gaborone United	TASC; Jwaneng Comets	
2008–09	Gaborone United	Mochudi Centre Chiefs	Mogoditshane Fighters; Great North Tigers; Naughty Boys	Jwaneng Comets; Motlakase Power Dynamos
2009–10	Township Rollers	Mochudi Centre Chiefs	Killer Giants; Jwaneng Comets; Boteti Young Fighters	TASC
2010–11	Township Rollers	Mochudi Centre Chiefs	TASC; Black Peril FC	Mogoditshane Fighters; Satmos
2011–12	Mochudi Centre Chiefs	Botswana Meat Commission	Notwane F.C. Great North Tigers; Satmos	Motlakase; Prisons XI; BR Highlanders
2012–13	Mochudi Centre Chiefs	Nico United	Prisons XI; Mogoditshane Fighters; BR Highlanders	
2013–14	Township Rollers	BDF XI		
2014–15	Mochudi Centre Chiefs	Orapa United		
2015–16	Township Rollers	Mochudi Centre Chiefs	Motlakase Power Dynamos; BR Highlanders; Satmos	Black Forest
2016–17	Township Rollers	Jwaneng Galaxy	Nico United; Green Lovers; Mahalapye United Hotspurs	
2017–18	Township Rollers	Jwaneng Galaxy	TAFIC; Uniao Flamengo Santos; Gilport Lions	Notwane; BR Highlanders; Prisons XI
2018–19	Township Rollers	Jwaneng Galaxy	Mochudi Centre Chiefs; Black Forest; Sankoyo Bush Bucks	Gilport Lions; Morupule Wanderers FC; TAFIC
2019–20	Jwaneng Galaxy	Township Rollers	TAFIC; Miscellaneous	Masitaoka; Sua Flamingoes
2020–21	cancelled due COVID-19			
2021–22	Gaborone United	Township Rollers	Notwane FC; Gilport Lions; Botswana Railways	Eleven Angels; Nico United; Holy Ghost
2022–23	Jwaneng Galaxy	Gaborone United	Prisons XI; Extension Gunners; Mogoditshane Fighters	TAFIC FC; Matebele FC; VTM FC

== Coach of the Season ==
Season	Winner	Team
2007–08	(Zambia) Mike Sithole	Gaborone United
2011–12	(Botswana) Daniel Nare	BMC
2012–13	(Zimbabwe) Madinda Ndlovu	Mochudi Centre Chiefs
2015–16	(England) Mark Harrison	Township Rollers
2016–17	(Botswana) Mogomotsi Mpote	Township Rollers
2017–18	(Serbia) Nikola Kavazovic	Township Rollers
2018–19	(Argentina) Rodolfo Zapata	Township Rollers
2019–20	(Portugal) Miguel da Costa	Jwaneng Galaxy

== Performance by club ==
Club	City	Titles	Last Title
Township Rollers	Gaborone	16	2018–19
Gaborone United	Gaborone	9	2025–26
Botswana Defence Force XI	Mogoditshane	7	2003–04
Mogoditshane Fighters	Mogoditshane	4	2003
Mochudi Centre Chiefs	Mochudi	4	2014–15
Extension Gunners	Lobatse	3	1994
Notwane	Gaborone	3	1998
Jwaneng Galaxy	Jwaneng	3	2023–24
ECCO City Greens	Francistown	1	2006–07
Police XI	Otse	1	2005–06

== Top goalscorers ==
Season	Goalscorer	Team	Goals
2005–06	(Botswana) Malepa Bolelang	ECCO City Green	24
2006–07	(Botswana) Pontsho Moloi	Mochudi Centre Chiefs	22
2007–08	(Zimbabwe) Master Masitara (Botswana) Jerome Ramatlhakwane	Nico United; Mochudi Centre Chiefs	18
2008–09	(Zimbabwe) Master Masitara	Nico United	27
2009–10	(Zimbabwe) Terrence Mandaza	Township Rollers	31
2011–12	(Botswana) Pontsho Moloi	Mochudi Centre Chiefs	
2012–13	(Botswana) Pontsho Moloi	Mochudi Centre Chiefs	
2013–14	(Zambia) Patrick Kaunda	Satmos	20
2014–15	(Botswana) Lemponye Tshireletso	Mochudi Centre Chiefs	15
2015–16	(Zimbabwe) Tendai Nyamadzawo	Gilport Lions	19
2016–17	(Zimbabwe) Terrence Mandaza	Township Rollers	17
2017–18	(Botswana) Thatayaone Kgamanyane	Gaborone United	20
2018–19	(Botswana) Thero Setsile	Jwaneng Galaxy	18
2021–22	(Botswana) Thabang Sesinyi	Jwaneng Galaxy	24
2022–23	(Botswana) Omaatla Kebatho	Orapa United	23
2023–24	(Botswana) Thabang Sesinyi	Jwaneng Galaxy	15
2024–25	(Botswana) Thatayaone Mgamanyane	Gaborone United	15
2025-26	(Botswana) Thabang Sesinyi	Jwaneng Galaxy	20

== Player of the season ==
Season	Best Player	Team
2005–06	(Botswana) Moemedi Moatlhaping	Township Rollers
2006–07	(Botswana) Malepa Bolelang	ECCO City Greens
2007–08	(Botswana) Oteng Moalosi	Mochudi Centre Chiefs
2008–09	(Botswana) Joseph Phetogo	Gaborone United
2009–10	(Botswana) Kabelo Dambe	Township Rollers
2013–14	(Botswana) Mwampule Masule	Township Rollers
2014–15	(Botswana) Lesego Galenamotlhale	Mochudi Centre Chiefs
2017–18	(Botswana) Edwin Moalosi	Township Rollers
2018–19	(Botswana) Thero Setsile	Jwaneng Galaxy
