= Botswana National Stadium =

Multi-purpose stadium in Gaborone, Botswana

Coordinates: 24°39′24″S 25°55′58″E

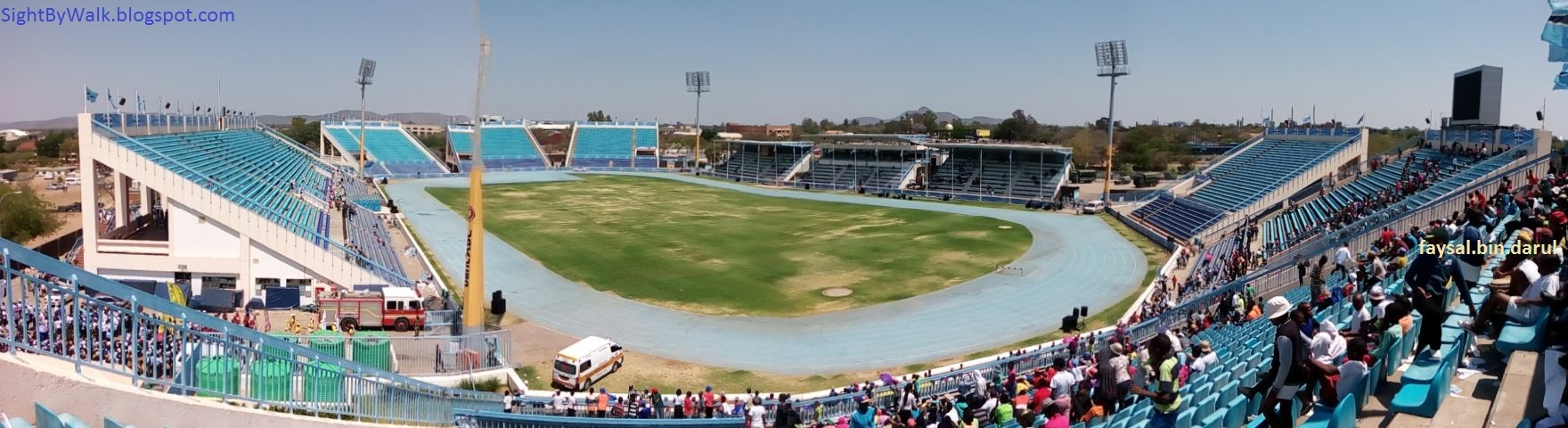
- Interactive map of Botswana National Stadium
- Location: Gaborone, Botswana
- Owner: Botswana National Sports Council
- Capacity: 25,000

Construction
- Built: 1965
- Opened: 1966

Tenants
- Township Rollers F.C. Botswana national football team

The Botswana National Stadium is a multi-purpose stadium in Gaborone, Botswana. It is currently used mostly for football matches. The stadium holds 25,000 people.

== Overview ==
The pitch is surrounded by an athletics track, the stadium is coupled with a rugby venue, which has fallen into disuse, and a tennis facility.

The stadium was made up of a total of 10 stands, three of which are covered. The three large stands on each end of the stadium made up the north and south ends. The west side of the stadium is made up of three covered stands, while the east end is made up of one giant uncovered stand. After the 2016 renovations, the 3 north stands were joined together. The same was done for the 3 south stands, increasing the stadium capacity by 3,000 seats from 22,000 to 25,000. From 22 to 31 May 2014, the stadium hosted the 2nd African Youth Games, Gaborone 2014 opening and closing ceremonies as well as the track and field events. A giant screen was erected in the middle north stand in August 2014.

The stadium is home to the Botswana national football team, the Zebras. It is also currently home to Gaborone based Botswana Premier League clubs Township Rollers F.C., Gaborone United S.C. and Notwane F.C. Mochudi side, Mochudi Centre Chiefs SC also uses the ground as their home base.

Apart from sports, the stadium also hosts other events like Botswana Police Service Day and Botswana Defense Force Day, as well as Botswana Independence Celebrations. Music festivals and church services are also held at this multi-use facility.

== Renovation of the National Stadium ==
Hitecon construction company won the tender to renovate the stadium. The purpose for renovating the National Stadium was for Botswana to accommodate some teams that were competing in the 2010 FIFA World Cup. The tournament was held in neighboring South Africa.

In 2008 the national stadium was closed for refurbishment with the hope that it would be used for the 2010 World Cup as a training camp for teams competing in it. This never materialized as the teams were instructed to train inside South Africa, and the stadium renovations were behind schedule.

Since its closure in 2008, the stadium had turned into a white elephant as it couldn't be used for sporting activities. The Premier League and athletics were among the sports that were most affected by the unavailability of the stadium. The premier league teams which rely mostly on gate takings were hard hit as they used stadiums around Gaborone which are much smaller and cannot accommodate teams with large followings, thus limiting their revenue.

In June 2013, the stadium was finally handed over to the BNSC after being closed for about five years. It hosted its first activity in August 2013, where Township Rollers F.C. hosted rivals Extension Gunners in the opening match of the 2013/14 Botswana Premier League season. Gunners went on to win 1–0.

In 2016, the stadium was closed again to increase its capacity to 25,000 in anticipation of the country's 50th independence celebrations on 30 September 2016.

The National Stadium is currently open and continues to host various sporting and non-sporting events.
