= Sua Flamingoes FC =

- Full name: Sua Flamingoes Football Club
- Ground: Sowa Town Council Stadium, Sowa
- League: Botswana Premier League
- 2025–2026: 3rd
colours

Sua Flamingoes FC is a football club from Sowa, Botswana, currently playing in the Botswana Premier League. The club was promoted to the top division of Botswana football in 2020.

== History ==
Flamingoes finished second in the 2018 second division and hosted the promotion playoff but lost out to Prisons XI.

Flamingoes won the 2020 Division One North competition after abandonment for COVID and were promoted to the premier league for the first time. David Bright took over as manager from Raizor Tsatselebe, who guided Flamingoes to promotion, in November 2020.

Flamingoes hired Serbian Nikola Kavazović mid-season in 2022 after a poor string of results under Zimbabwean manager Rahman Gumbo saw them second bottom after 15 games. Kavazović guided the club to an 8th-place finish before leaving in after six months in the position.
