= Mogoditshane =

- City
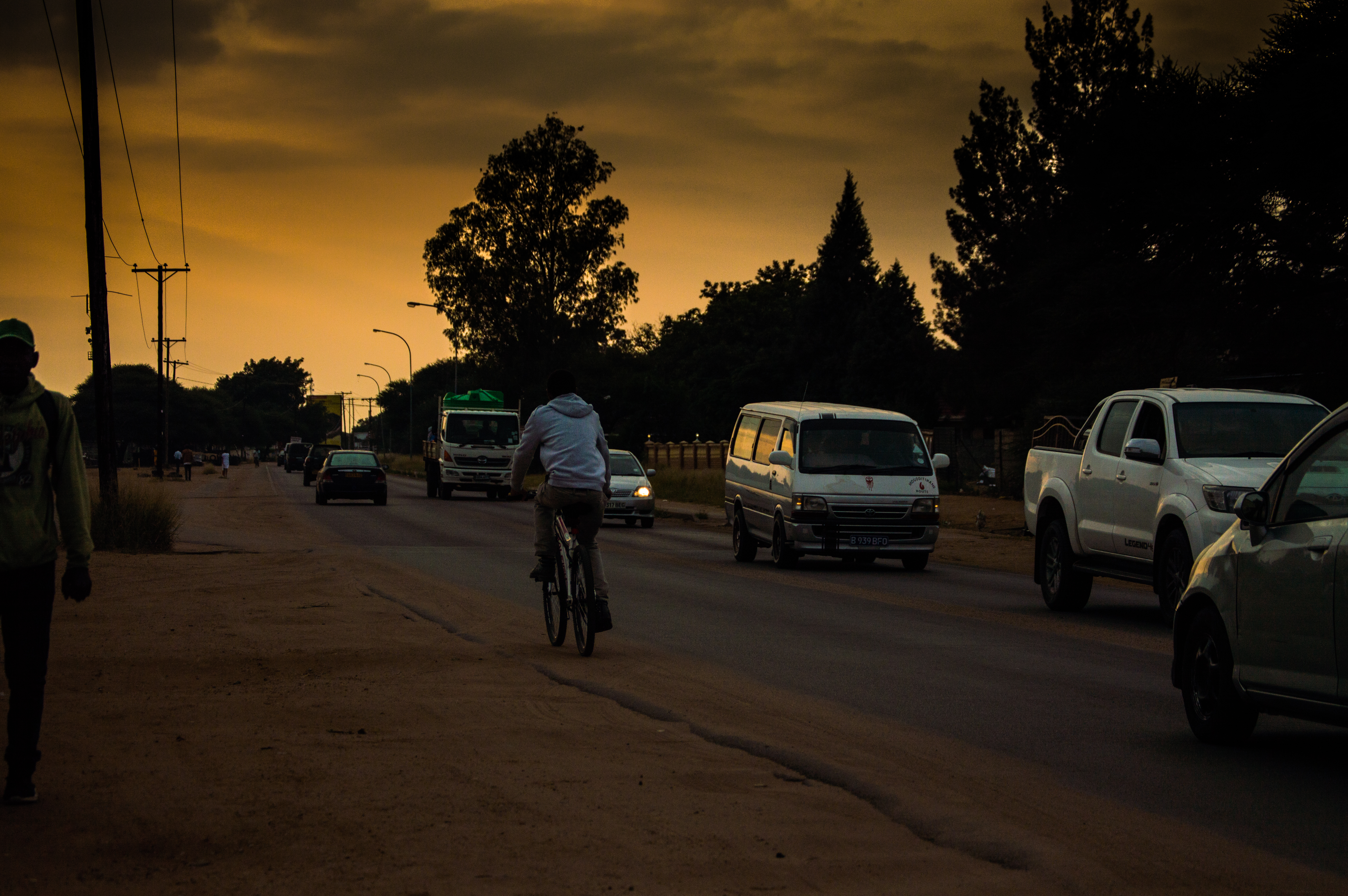
- Traffic in Mogoditshane
- Nicknames: Mogadishu, Sgadishu, Sghababa
- Location within Botswana
- Coordinates: 24°38′S 25°52′E
- Country: Botswana
- District: Kweneng District
- Sub-district: Kweneng East
- Elevation: 1,022 m (3,353 ft)

Population (2011)
  - Total: 57,637
- Time zone: UTC+2 (Central Africa Time)
  - Summer (DST): UTC+2 (not observed)
- ISO 3166 code: BW-KW
- Climate: BSh

Mogoditshane is a town located in the Kweneng District of Botswana.

== Population ==
Its population was 14,246 at the 2001 census, and 57,637 at the 2011 census.

== Gaborone ==
It is in conurbation to the capital Gaborone, whose agglomeration is now home to 421,907 inhabitants, at the 2011 census.

== Local football team ==
The football team is the Mogoditshane Fighters.

== See also ==
- List of cities in Botswana
