= Jwaneng Galaxy F.C. =

- Full name: Jwaneng Galaxy F.C.
- Short name: Galaxy
- Founded: 2014
- Ground: Galaxy Stadium
- Capacity: 2,000
- Coach: Morena Ramoreboli
- League: Botswana Premier League
- 2025–26: 2nd
Home colours	Away colours

Jwaneng Galaxy Football Club is a Botswana football club based in Jwaneng. The club currently plays in the Botswana Premier League.

== History ==
Galaxy was founded in 2015 after two local clubs merged: Jwaneng Comets and Debswana Youngsters.

Galaxy was promoted to the Botswana Premier League for the first time in 2015, winning the First Division South with a match to spare.

=== Botswana Premier League ===
Led by Zambian coach Mike Sithole, Galaxy won the club's first silverware in 2016–17, the Mascom Top 8 Cup, beating Orapa United in extra time in the final. The club also finished second in the Botswana Premier League and qualified for the 2018 CAF Confederation Cup. Sitole was fired in November 2017, but Galaxy ended the 2017–18 campaign in second again, only four points off of champions Township Rollers F.C.

Miguel da Costa became the head coach for the 2018–19 campaign after leaving Uganda's Vipers SC.

=== African competition ===
Under Morena Ramoreboli, Galaxy qualified for the group stages of the African Champions League for the first time in 2021–22.

== Honours ==
=== League ===
- Botswana Premier League
  - Champions (3): 2019–20, 2022–23, 2023–24
  - Runners-up (3): 2017, 2018, 2019
- Botswana First Division South
  - Champion (1): 2015

=== Cups ===
- Botswana FA Challenge Cup
  - Winners (2): 2024, 2025
- Mascom Top 8 Cup
  - Winners (2): 2016–17, 2018–19

== CAF competitions record ==
Last update: 24 February 2023

Season	Competition	Round	Club	Home	Away	Aggregate
2018	CAF Confederation Cup	PR	(Mozambique) Costa do Sol	0–1	0–1	0–2
2021–22	CAF Champions League	1R	(Central African Republic) Le Messager DFC 8ème	2–0	0–1	2–1
2021–22	CAF Champions League	2R	(Tanzania) Simba	0–2	3–1	3–3 (a)
2021–22	CAF Champions League	GS	(Tunisia) Espérance de Tunis	0–3	0–4	4th
2021–22	CAF Champions League	GS	(Algeria) CR Belouizdad	1–2	1–4	4th
2021–22	CAF Champions League	GS	(Tunisia) Étoile du Sahel	1–1	2–3	4th

Notes

- PR: Preliminary round
- 1R: First round
- 2Q: Second qualifying round
- GS: Group stage
