= Prisons XI Gaborone =

Prisons XI
- Full name: Prisons XI Gaborone
- Nickname: The Warders
- Short name: Prisons XI
- Ground: SSG Grounds, Marapula, Gaborone, Botswana
- League: Botswana Premier League
- 2025–26: 1st, First Division South (promoted)

Prisons XI Gaborone is a football club from Gaborone, Botswana, currently playing in the Botswana Premier League.

== History ==
Prisons XI were league runners-up in the early 1990s. Their greatest cup achievement was reaching the semifinals of the Coca-Cola Cup in 1994, losing to Extension Gunners 1–0.

Prisons XI gained promotion in 2012 after a single season in the lower divisions, defeating BR Highlanders in the promotion playoff. They were relegated the following season.

Prisons XI were promoted to the Botswana Premier League in 2018 after they defeated Sua Flamingoes on away goals after tying 2–2 in the two-legged promotion playoff. They spent eight years in the first division following their previous relegation in 2013. The "Warders" struggled during the 2018–19 season, at one point going eight games without a win, but still managed to finish 13th, one spot above relegation.
