= TAFIC F.C. =

TAFIC
- Full name: Tati African Football Independent Club
- Nickname: Matjimenyenga
- Founded: 1961
- Ground: Francistown Stadium, Francistown, Botswana
- Capacity: 26,000
- League: Botswana Premier League
- 2025–26: 9th

Tati African Football Independent Club also known as TAFIC for short, is a football club based in Francistown, Botswana. The team was relegated from the Botswana Premier League to the First Division North in 2014. Nicknamed Matjimenyenga, after a stream, which runs behind the low-income locations of Maipaafela and Kgaphamadi. The club motto: "Undipe ndi kupe". The club was founded in 1959 as a breakaway from the then popular TAFA football club. Information has it that the founders of TAFIC, which was initially known as Sharp Shooters in its formative years, were based at Kgaphamadi. They gained promotion back to the elite league as champions in the 2016/17 season but were subsequently relegated the very next season. They are currently playing in the Botswana Premier League.

== Honours ==
- Botswana FA Challenge Cup 2002
- Debswana First Division North League (FDN) 2016/17

== Performance in CAF competitions ==
- African Cup Winners' Cup

1993 – Preliminary Round
