= Otse =

- Village
- Location within Botswana
- Coordinates: 25°2′0″S 25°44′19″E
- Country: Botswana
- District: South-East District

Population (2011)
  - Total: 7,636
- Time zone: UTC+2 (CAT)

Otse is a village in the South-East District of Botswana. It is located 60 km south of Gaborone, along the Gaborone–Lobatse road and close to the border with South Africa. This village is home to the Balete people who are related to those in Ramotswa, Gabane and Mogobane. The population was 7,636 in 2011 census. Otse is surrounded by hills, most notably the ancestral Baratani hill.

== Demographics ==
Census	Population
1991	3,106
2001	5,192
2011	7,636^{Preliminary}

== Attractions ==
- Three historical site:
- Lentswe la Baratani; This is a hill located in Otse village which has many local legends attached to it. There is a legend about young lovers who went missing there; it is said the two were denied a chance to be together by their parents, but their love was too strong to be separated. One legend says that there is an enormous snake, possibly an African python, living on the hill which ate them. Lentswe la Baratani Hill is along the Gaborone-Lobatse road west of Otse village. The hill is about 42 km from the capital Gaborone and 20 km from Lobatse.
- Segorong
- One Game Reserve: Manyelanong Game Reserve

== Education ==
Otse has ten day care centres, two primary schools, one junior secondary school, and senior secondary school (Moeding College).
