= Notwane F.C. =

Notwane
- Full name: Notwane Football Club
- Nicknames: Sechaba, Makhete, Toronto, Team e Bosisi
- Founded: 1965
- Ground: Botswana National Stadium; Gaborone, Botswana
- Capacity: 25,000
- Chairman: Phillip Tiroyamodimo
- Manager: Oupa A. Kowa
- League: First Division South
- 2025–26: 10th, First Division South pattern_la1=
Home colours	Away colours

Notwane FC is a football club from Botswana based in Gaborone. It is named after the Notwane River. Notwane is owned by GMG Global Investments, a subsidiary of GMG Holdings and recently made major scoop by signing former South African international players, former Orlando Pirates player Benedict Vilakazi and former Mamelodi Sundowns player Manqoba Ngwenya

== History ==
Notwane were founded in 1965 and played in the first season of the Botswana Premier League and it is unknown if they won the 1978 Botswana FA Cup. They were relegated from the top flight for the first time in 2015.

The team sued the Botswana Football Association in 1992 after the BFA allowed Township Rollers a place in the premier league.

Notwane were promoted again in 2017. However, Notwane suffered financial difficulties which led to a financial dispute with coach 'Pio' Paul in 2018.

== Achievements ==
- Botswana Premier League: 2 or 3

Finalists in 1978, 1996, 1998

- Botswana Challenge Cup: 4

1978, 1995, 1997, 2006

- Botswana Independence Cup: 4

1994, 1995, 2003, 2004

== Performance in CAF competitions ==
- CAF Champions League: 3 appearances

1997 - First Round
1999 - Preliminary Round
2000 - Preliminary Round

- CAF Confederation Cup: 1 appearance

2007 - Preliminary Round

- CAF Cup Winners' Cup: 3 appearances

1979 - First Round
1996 - Second Round
1998 - First Round
