= Gaborone United S.C. =

Gaborone United
- Full name: Gaborone United Football Club
- Nicknames: Moyagoleele, Reds, Money Machine
- Founded: 1967; 59 years ago
- Ground: Gaborone United Stadium; Gaborone
- Capacity: 5,000
- Manager: Sean Connor
- League: Botswana Premier League
- 2025–26: Champions
Home colours	Away colours

Gaborone United Sporting Club (GU) is a professional football club from Botswana, based in Gaborone. Gaborone United play their home games at Gaborone United Stadium.

== Honours ==
- Botswana Premier League: 9
  - 1967, 1969, 1970, 1986, 1990, 2009, 2022, 2024–25, 2025–26
- Botswana FA Challenge Cup: 9
  - 1968, 1970, 1984, 1985, 1990, 2012, 2020, 2022, 2023
- Botswana Independence Cup: 8
  - 1978, 1979, 1980, 1981, 1984, 1985, 1992, 1993
- Mascom Top 8 Cup: 2
  - 2013, 2015

=== Other tournaments ===
- Kabelano Charity Cup: 2 (2003, 2018)
- Gaborone Fitness Centre Tournament: 1 (1984)
- City Day Cup: 1 (1993)
- Gaborone Sun Challenge Cup: 1 (1994)
- Supreme Cup: 1 (1995)

== Performance in CAF competitions ==
- CAF Champions League: 2 appearance

2010 - Second Round
2022/23 - Preliminary Round

- African Cup of Champions Clubs: 2 appearances

1987 - Preliminary Round
1991 - Preliminary Round

- CAF Confederation Cup: 1 appearance

2010 - Second Round of 16

- CAF Cup: 2 appearances

1994 - First Round
1998 - withdrew in First Round

== Players ==
=== Current squad ===
As of 18 November 2026

Note: Flags indicate national team as defined under FIFA eligibility rules; some limited exceptions apply. Players may hold more than one non-FIFA nationality.

No.	Pos.	Nation	Player
3	FW	BOT	Omphile Ramoagi
4	DF	BOT	Alford Velaphi
5	MF	BOT	Karabo Phiri
8	MF	NAM	Paulus Amutenya
10	MF	BOT	Thatayaone Kgamanyane
11	FW	NAM	Ambrosius Amseb
12	DF	BOT	Kitso Mangolo
15	DF	NAM	Ivan Kamberipa
16	GK	BOT	Tshepo Mooketsi
17	DF	BOT	Thabang Khuduga
18	MF	BOT	Lebogang Ditsele
19	FW	BOT	Kamogelo Moloi
21	DF	BOT	Thato Kebue

No.	Pos.	Nation	Player
22	FW	BOT	Thabo Maponda
24	MF	LBR	Sheikh Sesay
32	GK	BOT	Thabo Motswagole
33	DF	BOT	Mothusi Johnson
77	DF	ZIM	Tatenda Gora
—	DF	BOT	Shaun Phillip
—	DF	BOT	Kutlo Othusitse
—	MF	BOT	Thapelo Babedi
—	FW	BOT	Elkanah Nyathi
—	FW	COM	Ibroihim Youssouf
—	FW	BOT	Bame Morwalela
—	FW	BOT	Tlotlo Keipidile

== Notable former players ==
- (Botswana) Dipsy Selolwane
- (Botswana) Davis Kopi
