= Mogoditshane Fighters =

- Full name: Mogoditshane Fighters
- Nicknames: The Brazilians, Samba Boys, Village Warriors
- Founded: April 19, 1925
- Ground: Molepolole Stadium; Mogoditshane, Botswana
- Chairman: Rex Thobosi
- Manager: Mpho Mabogo
- League: Botswana First Division
- 2018/19: 7th
Home colours

Mogoditshane Fighters are a football (soccer) club from the Mogoditshane in Botswana.

The club's nickname is "The Brazilians".

== Achievements ==
- Mascom Premier League: 4
  - 1999, 2000, 2001, 2003
- Botswana Challenge Cup: 3
  - 1999, 2000, 2003
- Botswana Independence Cup: 1
  - 2000

== Performance in CAF competitions ==
- CAF Champions League: 1 appearance

2002 - Preliminary Round

- CAF Cup Winners' Cup: 2 appearances

2000 - First Round
2001 - First Round
