= Township Rollers F.C. =

Association football club in Gaborone, Botswana

Township Rollers
- Full name: Township Rollers Football Club
- Nicknames: Tse Tala, The Blues, Popa-Popa
- Founded: 1961; 65 years ago (as Mighty Tigers)
- Ground: Botswana National Stadium; UB Stadium; Jamali Stadium
- Capacity: 22,000
- Chairman: (Botswana) Walter Kgabung
- League: Botswana Premier League
- 2025–26: 7th
- Website: www.rollersfc.com
Home colours	Away colours

Township Rollers Football Club is a football club based in Gaborone, Botswana. Rollers are also known as Popa, The Blues or Tse Tala, the official nicknames of the club. The club is also often referred to as Mapalastina, a nickname that developed in the 1990s but has never been officially adopted by the club. Rollers is the most successful club in Botswana football history, having won more league titles and cup competitions than any other local side. It enjoys a large support base all over the country and has been called arguably the best-supported team in Botswana.

The club was founded in 1961 as Mighty Tigers, later adopting the name Township Rollers in 1965. Rollers has an old rivalry with cross town club Gaborone United. The match between the two sides is called the Gaborone Derby. Rollers also have a bitter rivalry with Mochudi Centre Chiefs, and matches between the two sides over time have eclipsed the Gaborone Derby as the biggest football encounter in Botswana due to both clubs' following and success.

Club financier Jagdish Shah has been the most influential figure at the club since 2013. The team is owned by its supporters, whose membership of the club qualifies them to be a part of the Township Rollers society. The society membership elects the Rollers executive committee at annual general meetings (AGM).

== History ==
The club was formed by the Public Works Department (PWD) workers of the Bechuanaland Protectorate (colonial-era Botswana) government in 1961. They called the team Mighty Tigers FC and in 1965, the name was changed to Township Rollers Football Club. The PWD workers had been charged with building the first internal roads of the new capital, Gaborone ahead of Botswana independence in 1966.

Since Gaborone was then a small town (a Township) and the PWD workers used compacting equipment called Rollers, the club adopted the name Township Rollers, with the club logo having an outline design of a map of the early Gaborone roads the club founders built: Queens, Khama Crescent, Botswana Road, Independence Avenue, Kaunda Road, South Ring Road. The logo also contained the rollers compacting equipment, a football and soccer boot.

Rollers made an impact in Botswana football in the 1960s and 1970s, led by administrators such as Francis van Vuuren and Mokhutshwane Sekgoma, with star players including Clement 'Captain Muller' Mothelesi, Morwalela Seema, Sliding Matsila, Sola 'Ace' Mokgadi, and goalkeeper Mchuu 'City' Manyalela. The club developed a huge rivalry with cross town side Gaborone United, matches between the two sides dubbed the Gaborone Derby.

After a national league was introduced in 1978, Rollers became hugely successful under Chibaso 'Coach' Kande, a player-coach from the then Zaire (Democratic Republic of Congo). Kande led Rollers to six league titles (1979, 1980, 1982, 1983, 1984 and 1985) before dying from a car accident, with Zimbabwean Ezekiel Mpofu leading Rollers to another national title in 1987.

The glorious period of the 1980s made Rollers the most successful club in the country's history leading to the club's popularity growing across the country. Rollers dominance waned in the 1990s, but the club still managed to win the 1995 league title, and the Coca-Cola Cup in 1993 and 1994, as well as the early 1990s season-opening trophy, the Gilbey's Cup.

Rollers was relegated to the first division league in 2003 leaving Extension Gunners as the only club in Botswana which has never been relegated, although the latter team played in the lower league before being promoted in the early 1980s. It took Rollers only one season to bounce back to the then Super League, where they became the first promoted side to win the elite league in their first season in the top flight. They also made history by being the first club to win a double in any one season. In the season 2004–05 under the tutelage of a Botswana icon, the late coach Banks Panene they won both the Coca-Cola Cup and the league title.

After the 2004–05 success, Township Rollers struggled to have impact in domestic competitions for a three-year period (2006-9) winning only the 2006 Kabelano Charity Cup. This was mainly due to the sale of their influential players among them Mogogi Gabonamong (who went on to captain South Africa's PSL club Santos), Moemedi Moatlhaphing and Phenyo Mongala who were sold to Platinum Stars. Mongala moved on to Pretoria University, and later Orlando Pirates and Bloemfontein Celtic before returning to Botswana club football. Rollers later sold other players to South African clubs, including Boitumelo Mafoko (Santos), Terrance Mandaza (Santos, later joining Marizburg United) as well as Kabelo Dambe and Mogakolodi 'Tsotso' Ngele (Platinum Stars).

Under managing director Somerset Gobuiwang, Rollers managed to win the 2009–10 Premier League amassing 78 points and beating their closest rivals Mochudi Centre Chiefs by 13 points as well attaining a 3–1 victory against the same team in the Coca-Cola Cup final. The club won all individual awards on offer for both the league and Coca-Cola Cup. Rollers proceeded to win the 2010-11 league title. In 2013, the club, historically registered as a society, announced a commercial drive, with the club now said to be under the management of the Township Holdings company, with Gobuiwang (40 percent), entrepreneur Jagdish Shah (40 percent) and the society, which is owned by the club's supporters having the balance 20 percent.

This ownership structure was challenged in court by former club officials Mookodi Seisa, Ernest Kgaboesele and club elder Alan Compton. The ruling delivered by Botswana High Court Judge Justice Leatile Dambe stated that "the affairs of the respondent (Township Rollers Football Club) are to be performed by the executive committee of the society to the exclusion of any other person or entity"

Shah had invested heavily in modernising Rollers operations, under his stewardship Rollers had gradually become a professional outfit on par with some South African premier soccer league (PSL) sides. At the society annual general meeting (AGM) held at the Gaborone West Community Hall in January 2016 the elected executive committee led by chairman Walter Kgabung was given the mandate to keep Shah as the club investor. Shah was later elected to the post of club president at a special general meeting held at Marang, Broadhurst, Gaborone in 2016.

Rollers famously made the group stage of the 2018 CAF Champions League after defeating Al-Merreikh of Sudan in the preliminary rounds. They finished bottom of their group with four points.

== Privatization ==
In 2012 prominent business man Jagdish Shah of CA Sales entered into an agreement with management of the club to privatize it. The resultant deal saw the formation of the holding company Township Holdings, with Jagdish Shah having a 40 percent stake and being the club's principal financier. This arrangement was challenged in court by former officials Mookodi Seisa and others, who said managing director Somerset Gobuiwang had not followed due diligence in privatising the club. The group had the backing of the club's then chairman David Spencer Mmui. The August 2015 High Court ruling by Justice Leatile Dambe returned Rollers to being purely a society owned by its members. The Rollers society AGM in January 2016 endorsed a continued working relationship with investor Shah, and began a process of adopting a new constitution, seeking ways of commercialising the club through proper legal means.

== Colours, emblem, nicknames ==
Since 1970, Township Rollers has played in their famous blue and gold strip for their home matches. For away matches they mostly used blue and white. There has never been a time in history, when the home kit has been drastically altered, hence the blue and gold colours are the most recognisable aspect of the team.

Township Rollers has gained numerous nicknames over time. The official nicknames of the club are "Popa", "Tse Tala" and "The Blues". The club motto is "Popa Popa e a ipopa" or "Popa" for short. This simply means "the one who moulds himself"; this may be due to the fact that Rollers became a success on their own without massive financial backing in the past. Other nicknames (not officially sanctioned by the club) include "The Happy People" and "Mapalastina" (Palestinians). Rollers have also been known as "The Tala Tsa ga MmaMasire", an allusion to the fact that the team between 2004 and 2014 was based at the Botswana Youth Centre MmaMasire Grounds in Gaborone West.

Rollers is often mistakenly considered to be a Gaborone West club. Over the years the club has had a few bases within the capital – mostly in Gaborone Central – and was based at Gaborone West for about ten of its five-decade history (around 2004–2014). Gaborone West did grow in influence as a Rollers heartland, although Gaborone Central was the club's formative home.

The Rollers emblem has had a few alterations over time. Their emblem features a football boot, a football and painting rollers, as well as a mapping of early Gaborone internal roads, a reference to the team's name and its working-class roots. On the bottom of the crest is their motto and nickname "Popa Popa ea Ipopa". The latter was added in 2010 on the eve of the team's 50-year anniversary. The crest features the blue and gold colours of the team.

== Support ==
Township Rollers has a large supporter base in Botswana, alongside clubs such as Mochudi Centre Chiefs, Extension Gunners, and Gaborone United. The club's blue and gold colors are commonly associated with its supporters in Gaborone. Township Rollers also has more than 52 support branches across Botswana and abroad. These branches are managed by branch committees, which are overseen by the National Branches Committee and report to the club's executive committee.

== Stadiums ==
In its early years Popa played their games in dusty football grounds in Gaborone due to the lack of stadiums in Botswana. Only when the National Stadium was opened after Botswana's independence in 1966 did they start using the multipurpose facility. The stadium has then acted as the team's home ground. Since the 1960s, Rollers has trained at various facilities in Gaborone, including the Gaborone Station Fire Department field, a field next to the Special Support Group (SSG) in Maruapula, Gaborone, the Botswana Youth Centre "Mma Masire" ground in Gaborone West, and the Botswana National Youth Centre headquarters at Fairgrounds. The club now trains in a modern lawn facility in Tlokweng.

Rollers have used the National Stadium as a home ground since the 1960s. As the Botswana Premier League (BPL) wanted to reduce fixture congestion, Popa has had to play home games in other grounds in and around Gaborone, most notably University of Botswana Stadium and Molepolole Sports Complex in nearby Molepolole.

== Rivalries ==
Township Rollers has a rivalry with fellow Gaborone team Gaborone United (GU). This rivalry can be traced back to early years of organised Botswana football as the two teams were part of the Gaborone Big Three, together with Notwane, the three sides being dominant from the early years of Botswana club football in the 1960s and 1970s. BDF XI (1980s) and Extension Gunners (1990s), later joined the Gaborone Big Three in achieving league success. The Gaborone Derby between Rollers and GU was Botswana football's biggest match between the 1960s and the 1990s. But in the post-2000 period the derby waned somewhat due to the mixed fortunes of the teams, as they struggled in the early years of the new millennium (2000-4).

Due to the rise of Mochudi Centre Chiefs in the mid to late 2000s, Rollers found themselves competing for honours with the Kgatleng side; the two sides winning nine of the ten league titles between the 2007-8 and 2016–17 seasons (five won by Rollers, four by Centre Chiefs). This led to their rivalry becoming intense. From the mid-2000s Rollers and Chiefs amassed squads that had the cream of local football talent. Games between the two teams are normally at the National Stadium, which acts as the home ground of both teams.

== Sponsors ==
- Stanbic Bank
- Builders Mart
- Liberty Life
- Cresta
- Umbro
- JB Sports
- Shield
- Jack's Gym
- NTT Nissan Botswana

== Honours ==
=== Leagues ===
- Botswana Premier League: 16

1979, 1980, 1982, 1983, 1984, 1985, 1987, 1995, 2004–05, 2009–10, 2010–11, 2013-14, 2015–16, 2016-17, 2017-18, 2018-19

- Botswana First Division South: 1

2003-04

=== Cups ===
- FA Challenge Cup: 6

1979, 1993, 1994, 1996, 2005, 2010

- Botswana Independence Cup: 1

1987

- Gilbeys Cup : 3

1991, 1992 and 1996.

- Mascom Top 8 Cup: 2

2011-12, 2018

=== Doubles and trebles ===
- Doubles
  - League and FA Cup:3
    - 1979, 2004–05, 2009-10
  - League and Mascom Top 8 Cup:1
    - 2017-18

== Performance in CAF competitions ==
Competition	Pld	W	D	L	GF	GA
African Cup Winners' Cup	8	3	2	3	10	17
African Cup of Champions Clubs	12	2	1	9	8	28
CAF Champions League	10	4	1	5	13	15
CAF Confederation Cup	6	3	1	2	7	4
Total	36	12	5	19	38	64

Season	Competition	Round	Club	Home	Away	Aggregate
1980	African Cup Winners' Cup	First round	(Zaire) TP Mazembe	2–2	1–4	3–6
1981	African Cup of Champions Clubs	First round	(Nigeria) Shooting Stars	2–0	1–7	3–7
1983	African Cup of Champions Clubs	Preliminary round	(Eswatini) Mbabane Highlanders	0–1	1–2	1–3
1984	African Cup of Champions Clubs	Preliminary round	(South Africa) Kaizer Chiefs	0–2	1–1	1–3
1985	African Cup of Champions Clubs	First round	(Zaire) AS Bilima	0–1	0–3	0–4
1988	African Cup of Champions Clubs	Preliminary round	(Eswatini) Mbabane Highlanders	1–4	0–2	1–6
1994	African Cup Winners' Cup	Preliminary round	(Eswatini) Eleven Men in Flight	2–1	1–3	3–4
1995	African Cup Winners' Cup	First round	(Zambia) Kabwe Warriors	1–4	2–1	3–5
1996	African Cup of Champions Clubs	Preliminary round	(Namibia) Black Africa	2–1	0–4	2–5
1997	African Cup Winners' Cup	Preliminary round	(Lesotho) Lerotholi Polytechnic	1–0	0–2	3–7
2006	CAF Confederation Cup	Preliminary round	(Seychelles) Super Magic Brothers	1–0	2–0	3–0
2006	CAF Confederation Cup	Round of 32	(Zambia) ZESCO United	2–0	1–2	3–2
2006	CAF Confederation Cup	Round of 16	(Angola) G.D. Interclube	1–1	0–1	1–2
2011	CAF Champions League	Preliminary round	(Angola) G.D. Interclube	w/o	w/o	w/o
2015	CAF Champions League	Preliminary round	(South Africa) Kaizer Chiefs	0–1	1–2	1–3
2017	CAF Champions League	Preliminary round	(Madagascar) CNaPS Sport	3–2	1–2	4–4 (a)
2018	CAF Champions League	Preliminary round	(Sudan) Al-Merrikh	3–0	1–2	4–2
2018	CAF Champions League	First round	(Tanzania) Young Africans	0–0	2–1	2–1
2018	CAF Champions League	Group stage	(Uganda) KCCA	1-0	0-1	
2018	CAF Champions League	Group stage	(Tunisia) Espérance Sportive de Tunis	0-0	1-4	
2018	CAF Champions League	Group stage	(Egypt) Al Ahly	0-1	0-3	
2018-19	CAF Champions League	Preliminary round	(Lesotho) Bantu FC	1-1	1-1	2-2 (3-4 pen.)
2019-20	CAF Champions League	Preliminary round	(Tanzania) Young Africans	0-1	1-1	1-2

== Managerial history ==
- (Zaire) Chibaso Kande (1978-1985)
- (Zimbabwe) Ezekiel Mpofu (1985-1989)
- (Zambia) Kaiser Kalambo (1989–1991)
- (Zambia) Freddie Mwila (1992-1993)
- (Zambia) Edwin Kanyanta (1993-1998)
- (Burundi) Ramadhan Nsanzurwimo (2002-2003)
- (Botswana) Joseph Panene (2003-2005)
- (Zimbabwe) Madinda Ndlovu (2005-2007)
- (Botswana) Daniel Nare (2007) (interim)
- (Botswana) David Bright (2007-2008)
- (Zambia) Dickson Ngwenya (2008)
- (Zimbabwe) Rahman Gumbo (2008-2010)
- (Zambia) Wesley Mondo (2010-2012)
- (Zambia) Mike Sithole (2012) (interim)
- (Zimbabwe) Darlington Dodo (2012-2013)
- (Zimbabwe) Madinda Ndlovu (2013-2015)
- (Botswana) Mogomotsi Mpote (2015) (caretaker)
- (England) Mark Simon Harrison (2015-2017)
- (Botswana) Mogomotsi Mpote (2017)
- (Serbia) Nikola Kavazović (2017-2018)
- (Argentina) Rodolfo Zapata (2018-2019)
- (Czech Republic) Thomas Trucha (2019-2020)
- (Scotland) Frank Nuttall (2020)
- (Serbia) Nikola Kavazovic (2020-2021)
- (Turkey) Hassan Oktay (2021)
- (France) Romain Folz (2021-)2022
