= Kgatleng East =

Parliamentary constituency in Botswana

- Single-member constituency for the National Assembly
- District: Kgatleng
- Population: 37,566
- Electorate: 14,667
- Major settlements: Mochudi; Oodi; Modipane
- Area: 3,477 km^{2}

Current constituency
- Created: 1994
- Party: BDP
- Created from: Mochudi
- MP: Mabuse Pule
- Margin of victory: 30 (0.3 pp)

Kgatleng East is a constituency in the Kgatleng District represented by Mabuse Pule, a BDP MP in the National Assembly of Botswana since 2019.

== Constituency profile ==
Kgatleng East was created from the former Mochudi constituency ahead of the 1994 general election. It was contested as Mochudi East in the 2014 and 2019 general elections, before being contested again as Kgatleng East from the 2024 general election onwards.

The constituency lies in the Kgatleng District and includes eastern parts of Mochudi and surrounding villages.

The constituency has the following localities:

1. Malolwane
2. Oodi
3. Modipane
4. Sikwane
5. Mmathubudukwane
6. Ramonaka
7. Ramotlabaki
8. Oliphant's Drift
9. Mabalane
10. Dikwididi
11. Part of Mochudi

== Members of Parliament ==
Key: BNF BDP UDC

Election	Winner
1994 election	Isaac Mabiletsa
1999 election	Isaac Davids
2004 election	Isaac Mabiletsa
2009 election	Isaac Mabiletsa
2014 election	Isaac Davids
2019 election	Mabuse Pule
2024 election	Mabuse Pule

== Election results ==
=== 2024 election ===
General election 2024: Kgatleng East
Party	Candidate	Votes	%	±%
BDP	Mabuse Pule	4,661	39.58	−22.49
UDC	Nono Kgafela-Mokoka	4,631	39.33	+4.11
BCP	Stephen Makhura	2,484	21.09	N/A
Margin of victory		30	0.25	−26.60
Total valid votes		11,776	96.44	−3.16
Rejected ballots		435	3.56	+3.16
Turnout		12,211	83.25	−3.95
Registered electors		14,667		
BDP hold		Swing	−13.30	

=== 2019 election ===
General election 2019: Mochudi East
Party	Candidate	Votes	%	±%
BDP	Mabuse Pule	12,608	62.07	+28.03
UDC	Bright Molebatsi	7,153	35.22	−3.88
AP	Diane Moagi	550	2.71	N/A
Margin of victory		5,455	26.86	N/A
Total valid votes		20,311	99.59	+0.48
Rejected ballots		83	0.41	−0.48
Turnout		20,394	87.21	+1.15
Registered electors		23,386		
BDP gain from UDC		Swing	+15.96	

=== 2014 election ===
General election 2014: Mochudi East
Party	Candidate	Votes	%	±%
UDC	Isaac Davids	6,824	39.10	−3.83
BDP	Mmachakga Moruakgomo	5,941	34.04	+1.68
BCP	Isaac Mabiletsa	4,528	25.95	+1.24
Independent	Japhta Radibe	159	0.91	N/A
Margin of victory		883	5.06	−5.52
Total valid votes		17,452	99.11	+0.22
Rejected ballots		156	0.89	−0.22
Turnout		17,608	86.06	+6.28
Registered electors		20,460		
UDC hold		Swing	−2.76	

=== 2009 election ===
General election 2009: Kgatleng East
Party	Candidate	Votes	%	±%
BNF	Isaac Mabiletsa	6,768	42.94	−0.93
BDP	Isaac Davids	5,101	32.36	+1.40
BCP	Phillip Monowe	3,894	24.70	−0.47
Margin of victory		1,667	10.58	−2.34
Total valid votes		15,763	98.90	+1.62
Rejected ballots		176	1.10	−1.62
Turnout		15,939	79.78	+0.98
Registered electors		19,978		
BNF hold		Swing	−1.17	

=== 2004 election ===
General election 2004: Kgatleng East
Party	Candidate	Votes	%	±%
BNF	Isaac Mabiletsa	5,066	43.87	+15.13
BDP	Isaac Davids	3,575	30.96	−8.94
BCP	Steven Makhura	2,907	25.17	−6.19
Margin of victory		1,491	12.91	N/A
Total valid votes		11,548	97.28	+5.69
Rejected ballots		323	2.72	−5.69
Turnout		11,871	78.80	−5.43
Registered electors		15,065		
BNF gain from BDP		Swing	+12.03	

=== 1999 election ===
General election 1999: Kgatleng East
Party	Candidate	Votes	%	±%
BDP	Isaac Davids	2,968	39.90	−0.23
BCP	Isaac Mabiletsa	2,333	31.36	N/A
BNF	Steven Makhura	2,138	28.74	−31.13
Margin of victory		635	8.54	N/A
Total valid votes		7,439	91.59	N/A
Rejected ballots		683	8.41	N/A
Turnout		8,122	84.23	+4.07
Registered electors		9,643		
BDP gain from BNF		Swing	+15.45	

=== 1994 election ===
General election 1994: Kgatleng East
Party	Candidate	Votes	%
BNF	Isaac Mabiletsa	3,527	59.87
BDP	Sidney Pilane	2,364	40.13
Margin of victory		1,163	19.74
Turnout		5,891	80.16
Registered electors		7,349	
BNF win (new seat)			
