= 2012–13 Botswana First Division South =

Botswana First Division South
- Season: 2012–13
- Champions: Wonder Sporting
- Relegated: Gabane United; Kanye Swallows

The 2012–13 Botswana First Division South was the 48th season of the Botswana First Division South since its inception in 1966. It was played from August to May. Wonder Sporting were crowned champions.

== Team summaries ==
Teams promoted from Botswana Division One

Teams relegated from Botswana Premier League

- Prisons XI
- Mogoditshane Fighters

Teams promoted to Botswana Premier League

- Wonder Sporting

Teams relegated to Botswana Division One

- Gabane United
- Kanye Swallows

Stadiums and locations

Team	Location	Ground
Wonder Sporting	Otse	
Jwaneng Comets	Jwaneng	
Modipane United	Modipane	
Killer Giants	Ramotswa	
Masitaoka	Molepolole	
Black Peril	Tlokweng	
Letlapeng	Molepolole	
Taung Young Strikers	Taung	
Mochudi Buffaloes	Mochudi	
Ghanzi Terrors	Ghanzi	
Gabane United	Gabane	
Kanye Swallows	Kanye	

== League table ==
Pos	Team	Pld	W	D	L	GF	GA	GD	Pts	Promotion or relegation
1	Wonder Sporting (C)	22	12	8	2	?	?	—	44	Champions, promoted to Botswana Premier League
2	Jwaneng Comets (Q)	22	10	9	3	?	?	—	39	Qualified for Botswana First Division playoffs
3	Modipane United	22	10	8	4	?	?	—	38	
4	Killer Giants	22	10	8	4	?	?	—	38	
5	Masitaoka	22	10	6	6	?	?	—	36	
6	Black Peril	21	?	?	?	?	?	—	32	
7	Letlapeng	22	?	?	?	?	?	—	26	
8	Taung Young Strikers	22	4	8	10	?	?	—	20	
9	Mochudi Buffaloes	21	5	8	8	?	?	—	23	
10	Ghanzi Terrors	22	4	8	10	?	?	—	20	
11	Gabane United (R)	22	?	?	?	?	?	—	16	Relegated to Botswana Division One
12	Kanye Swallows (R)	22	2	9	11	?	?	—	14 (Note: 1 point deducted?)	Relegated to Botswana Division One

(C) Champions; (Q) Qualified for the phase indicated; (R) Relegated
