= 2017–18 Botswana First Division South =

Botswana First Division South
- Season: 2017-18
- Champions: Notwane
- Promoted: Jwaneng Fighters; Blue Stars
- Relegated: Letlapeng; Lesirane City

The 2017-18 Botswana First Division South was the 53rd season of the Botswana First Division South since its inception in 1966. It was played from August to May. Notwane were crowned champions.

== Team summaries ==
Location of teams in the 2014-15 Botswana Premier League

Teams promoted from Botswana Division One

- Jwaneng Fighters
- Blue Stars

Teams relegated to Botswana Division One

- Letlapeng
- Lesirane City

Stadiums and locations

Team	Location	Ground
Notwane	Gaborone	SSG Ground
Prisons XI	Gaborone	SSG Ground
Broadhurst United	Gaborone	
Mogoditshane Fighters	Mogoditshane	
Black Peril	Tlokweng	
Mochudi Rovers	Mochudi	
Tlokweng Red Sparks	Tlokweng	
Modipane United	Modipane	
Black Rangers	Hukuntsi	
Letlapeng	Molepolole	
Matebejana	Mogoditshane	

== League table ==
Pos	Team	Pld	W	D	L	GF	GA	GD	Pts	Promotion or relegation
1	Notwane (C)	22	?	?	?	?	?	—	44	Champions, promoted to Botswana Premier League
2	Prisons XI (Q)	22	?	?	?	?	?	—	38	Qualified for Botswana First Division playoffs
3	Broadhurst United	22	?	?	?	?	?	—	33	
4	Mogoditshane Fighters	22	?	?	?	?	?	—	33	
5	Black Peril	22	?	?	?	?	?	—	32	
6	Mochudi Rovers	22	?	?	?	?	?	—	25	
7	Tlokweng Red Sparks	22	?	?	?	?	?	—	25	
8	Modipane United	22	?	?	?	?	?	—	19	
9	Black Rangers	22	?	?	?	?	?	—	19	
10	Letlapeng (Q, R)	22	?	?	?	?	?	—	18	Relegated to Botswana Division One
11	Matebejana (Q)	22	?	?	?	?	?	—	16	
12	Lesirane City (R)	22	?	?	?	?	?	—	14	Relegated to Botswana Division One

Source: rsssf.com
(C) Champions; (Q) Qualified for the phase indicated; (R) Relegated
