= 2018–19 Botswana First Division South =

Botswana First Division South
- Season: 2018-19
- Champions: Gilport Lions
- Promoted: Holy Ghost; Ncojane Young Stars
- Relegated: Black Rangers; Modipane United; Blue Stars

The 2018-19 Botswana First Division South was the 54th season of the Botswana First Division South since its inception in 1966. It was played from August to May. Gilport Lions were crowned champions.

== Team summaries ==
Teams promoted from Botswana Division One

- Holy Ghost
- Ncojane Young Stars

Teams relegated from Botswana Premier League

- Sankoyo Bush Bucks
- Mochudi Centre Chiefs
- Black Forest

Teams promoted to Botswana Premier League

- Gilport Lions

Teams relegated to Botswana Division One

- Black Rangers
- Modipane United
- Blue Stars

Stadiums and locations

Team	Location	Ground
Gilport Lions	Lobatse	
Jwaneng Fighters	Jwaneng	
Mochudi Rovers	Mochudi	
Broadhurst United	Gaborone	
Uniao Flamengo Santos	Gabane	
Matebejane	Mogoditshane	
Mogoditshane Fighters	Mogoditshane	
Black Peril	Tlokweng	
Tlokweng Red Sparks	Tlokweng	
Black Rangers	Tsabong	
Modipane United	Modipane	
Blue Stars	Ghanzi	

== League table ==
Pos	Team	Pld	W	D	L	GF	GA	GD	Pts	Promotion or relegation
1	Gilport Lions (C)	22	12	3	7	29	19	+10	45 (Note: 6 bonus points?)	Champions, promoted to Botswana Premier League
2	Jwaneng Fighters (Q)	22	9	8	5	26	22	+4	35	Qualified for Botswana First Division playoffs
3	Mochudi Rovers	22	9	7	6	21	14	+7	34	
4	Broadhurst United	22	8	10	4	17	14	+3	34	
5	Uniao Flamengo Santos	22	6	13	3	18	14	+4	31	
6	Matebejane	22	8	6	8	24	22	+2	30	
7	Mogoditshane Fighters	22	8	6	8	29	29	0	30	
8	Black Peril	22	6	10	6	26	26	0	28	
9	Tlokweng Red Sparks	22	6	10	6	27	28	−1	28	
10	Black Rangers (R)	22	4	11	7	18	22	−4	23	Relegated to Botswana Division One
11	Modipane United (R)	22	5	6	11	22	27	−5	16 (Note: 5 points deducted?)	Relegated to Botswana Division One
12	Blue Stars (R)	22	3	6	13	19	39	−20	15	Relegated to Botswana Division One

Source: rsssf.com
(C) Champions; (Q) Qualified for the phase indicated; (R) Relegated
