= Kgomodiatshaba =

- Location in Botswana
- Coordinates: 23°39′47″S 26°4′21″E
- Country: Botswana
- District: Kgatleng District

Population (2001)
  - Total: 330

Kgomodiatshaba is a village in Kgatleng District of Botswana. The village is located around 110 km north of Mochudi, and it has a primary school. The population was 330 in 2001 census.
