= Dikgonnye =

- Location in Botswana
- Coordinates: 24°8′21″S 26°0′28″E
- Country: Botswana
- District: Kgatleng District

Population (2011)
  - Total: 431

Dikgonnye is a village in Kgatleng District of Botswana. The village is located 40 km north-west of Mochudi, and it has a primary school. The population was 431 in 2011 census.
