= Gillian Condy =

South African artist

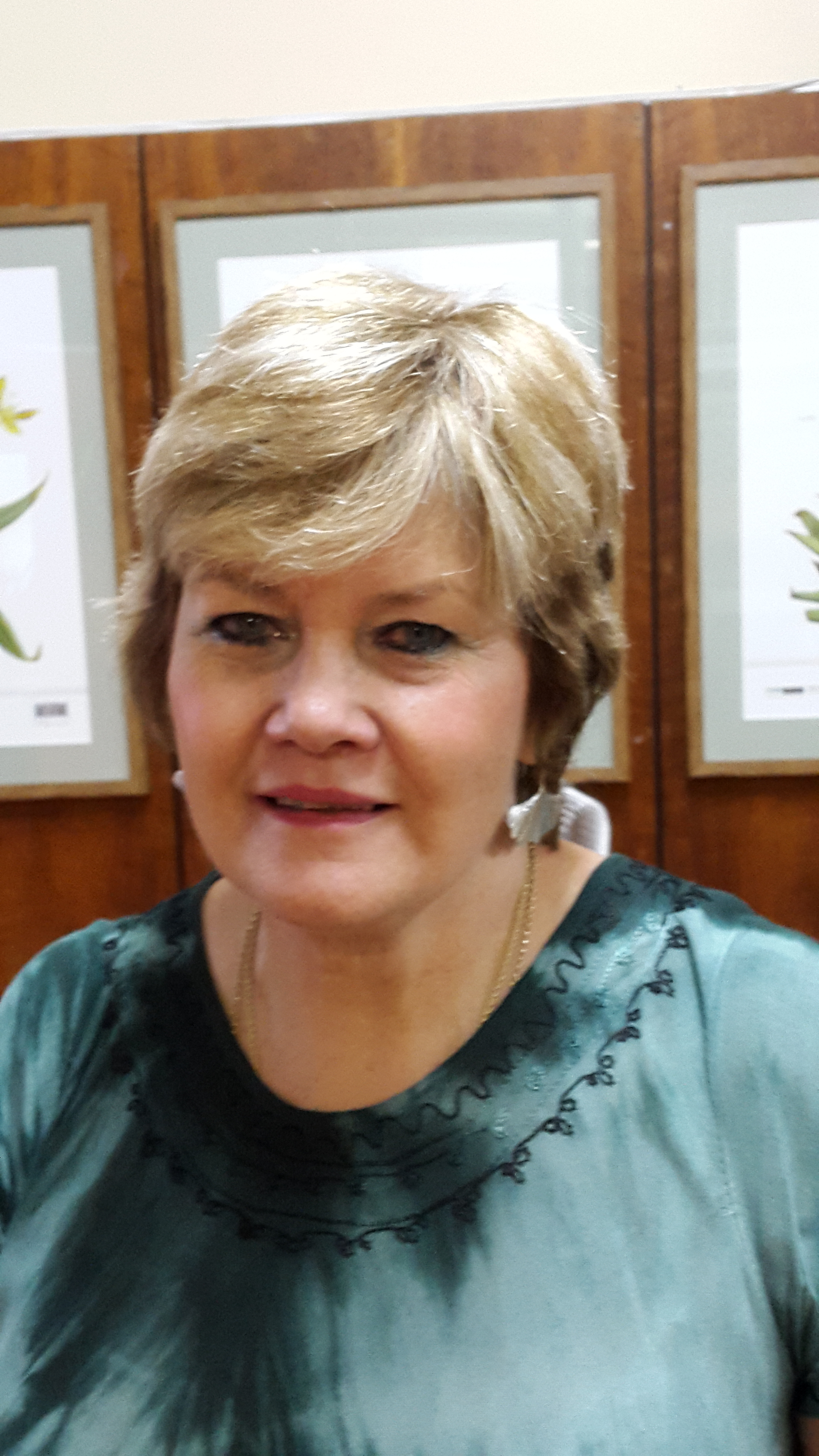
- Condy in 2017
- Born: December 5, 1952 (age 73)
- Citizenship: Nairobi
- Education: Master of Arts, Royal College of Arts
- Awards: Gold Medal, Royal Horticultural Society

Gillian Condy (born 5 December 1952, Nairobi) is a South African botanical artist. She has illustrated more than 200 plates for Flowering Plants of Africa, contributed to various other South African National Botanical Institute publications and eight plates for Curtis’s Botanical Magazine. She has illustrated two books by Charles Craib, Geophytic Pelargoniums (2001) and Grass Aloes in the South African Veld (2005). She also contributed to the biographic section in the book South African Botanical Art: Peeling back the Petals (2001).

== Biography ==
Condy was born in Kenya, the youngest of three daughters of Thomas Roy Condy and Phyllis Mary Poulton, and spent her childhood in Uganda where her love for Africa and its plants developed. She received her training at Middlesex Polytechnic in London as a natural history illustrator and obtained a Master of Arts degree from the Royal College of Art for a project entitled "British Poisonous Plants".

Condy returned to Africa by way of Phuthadikobo Museum at Mochudi in Botswana with the International Voluntary Service and spent two years roughing it before moving to Lobatse. In 1983 she became the resident botanical artist with the South African National Botanical Institute in Pretoria, retiring in 2018. She has retained her ties with Botswana through the design of 13 sets of postage stamps for that country since 1982.

== Honours and awards ==
Condy has been awarded gold medals by the Royal Horticultural Society and in 1990 was presented with the Jill Smythies Award from the Linnean Society of London. In 1992 she received the Beeld Stamp Design of the Year award for Edible Wild Fruits of Bophuthatswana and second place in 1993 for Acacia Trees. Her work has been shown internationally in more than 60 exhibitions. She has also exhibited at the 7th International Exhibit of Botanical Art and Illustration, Hunt Institute for Botanical Documentation in Pittsburgh, USA. In 2000 she was awarded a gold medal at the inaugural Kirstenbosch Exhibition of Botanical Art, followed by Silver in 2002 and Gold in 2004.

In December 2001 she was awarded the Cythna Letty Medal by the Botanical Society of South Africa. In 2006 she designed a set of six stamps for South Africa showing Clivia species.

Gillian Condy is one of the founding members of the Botanical Artists Association of Southern Africa (BAASA). She runs regular art courses for SANBI and BAASA. Her artwork is found on the Blue Train and in collections around the world.

== Publications ==
- 2001 Geophytic Pelargoniums - with Charles Craib (Umdaus Press) ISBN 1-919766-14-6
- 2001 South African Botanical Art : Peeling Back the Petals (Fernwood Press) ISBN 1-874950-54-7
- 2005 Grass Aloes in the South African Veld - with Charles Craib (Umdaus Press) ISBN 1-919766-41-3
