= Leshibitse =

Coordinates: 23°50′37″S 26°26′5″E

Location of Leshibitse

Leshibitse is a village in Kgatleng District, Botswana. The village is located 85 km north of Mochudi, and it has a primary school. The population was 407 in 2001 census.
