= Botswana Division One =

- Founded: 1966
- Country: Botswana
- Confederation: Botswana Football Association
- Number of clubs: 202; Chobe: 14; Nhabe: 13; Boteti: 12; Francistown: 12; Selibe Phikwe: 12; Central North: 6 Tswapong: 10; Central South: 17; Kweneng: 16; Kgatleng:16; Gaborone: 14; Southern: 12; South East: 16; Kgalagadi South: 6 Kgalagadi Central: 6 Hukuntsi: 9 Ghanzi: 11
- Level on pyramid: 3
- Promotion to: Botswana First Division North; Botswana First Division South
- Relegation to: Botswana Division Two
- Domestic cup: FA Cup
- Current champions: Chobe United (CHORFA Division One); Maun United Terrors (NRFA Division One); Diamond Chiefs (BORFA Division One); Tonota (FRAFA Division One); Peacemakers (SPRFA Division One); Tsabotlhe (CNRFA Division One); Palapye (TRFA Division One); Santa Green (CSRFA Division One); Masitaoka (Kweneng Division One); Bokaa Young Pirates (Kgatleng Division One); Taung Young Strikers (SOFA Division One); Holy Ghost (GRFA Division One); Kanye United (SERFA Division One); King Rodgers (Tsabong Division One); Kang United (KCRFA Division One); Moselebe Young Fighters (HRFA Division One); Ncojane Young Stars (Ghanzi Division One)

The Botswana Division One, also known as the Second Division, is Botswana's third tier of professional football. Although it is the poorest in terms of organisation and remuneration, it consists of more teams than the Premier League and First Division.

== League structure ==
Division One is split into 17 regional leagues consisting of 6 to 17 teams to ease fixture congestion and reduce financial strain on economically struggling clubs, . A localised football association runs each of these regional leagues under the overall management of the BFA and follows the Botswana football calendar from August to May. At the end of each campaign, the 17 regional champions qualify for and contest the Botswana Division One playoffs. The winners of each block are then promoted to either the First Division North or South depending on their geographical location (the north and east blocks feed the First Division North, whereas the south and west blocks feed the First Division South). Prior to this, the four block winners had to compete in a secondary playoff, which saw the number of promoted teams reduced to just two. However, that format was abandoned in 2015 after mass complaints by teams.
