= Ramotlabaki =

Village in Botswana

Coordinates: 23°51′9″S 26°55′21″E

Location of Ramotlabaki

Ramotlabaki is a village in Kgatleng District of Botswana. It is located 120 km north-east of Mochudi, and is close to the border with South Africa. Ramotlabaki has a primary school and the population was 200 in 2001 census.
