= Boteti Regional Football Association Division One League =

Boteti Regional Football Association Division One
- Organising body: Boteti Regional Football Association
- Founded: 1966
- Country: Botswana
- Region: Boteti
- Number of clubs: 12
- Level on pyramid: 3
- Promotion to: Botswana First Division South
- Relegation to: BORFA Division Two
- Domestic cup: FA Cup
- League cup: GM's Cup
- Current champions: Diamond Chiefs (2018-19)
- Current: 2018-19 BORFA Division One

The Boteti Regional Football Association Division One League, also known as the BORFA Division One, is one of the regional leagues that make up the third tier of Botswana football. It is administered by the Boteti Regional Football Association and features teams from Boteti region.

== Sponsorship ==
In 2019 the league secured a two-year sponsorship from Lucara Botswana, making Boteti Division One the first Botswana Division One league to be sponsored. Below is a list of all the sponsors to date:

- 2019-2021: Lucara

== Past seasons ==
Season	Winners	Runners-up	Relegated at end of season	Promoted at end of season
2017-18	White Diamonds			
2018-19	Diamond Chiefs			
