= Isaac Mabiletsa =

Botswanan politician

- Born: Isaac Stephen Mabiletsa; Mochudi, Botswana
- Occupation: Politician
- Years active: 2010 - 2014
- Known for: Former assistant speaker to the Botswanan parliament
- Children: 1

Isaac Stephen Mabiletsa is a Motswana politician who served as the assistant speaker of the 10th Parliament of Botswana representing Kgatleng East for the Botswana National Front (2010–2012) and Botswana Congress Party (2012–2014), the latter of which he helped to establish.

In 2015, Mabiletsa received media attention when his younger brother, Ndaba, was prosecuted for the murder of their 85 year-old mother in Morwa.
