= 2022–23 Botswana First Division South =

Botswana First Division South
- Season: 2022–23
- Champions: Matebele FC
- Relegated: Broadhurst Black Rangers

The 2022–23 season was the 58th season of the Botswana First Division South, the second division of the football system in Botswana. Matebele FC from Matebeleng became champions after finishing just one point above VTM FC and Notwane FC. Through finishing first, Matebele FC promoted to the Botswana Premier League after a fierce months long battle for the number 1 sport. Second-placed VTM FC played a tie against Chadibe, the number two of the Botswana First Division North. VTM FC beat Chadibe after a 6–5 penalty which ensured promotion to the top tier of Botswana.

== League Table ==
Pos	Team	Pld	GD	Pts	
1	Matebele FC (C)	22	+15	44	Champions (promotion to the Botswana Premier League)
2	VTM FC	22	+23	43	Play-offs (promoted after beating Chadibe)
3	Notwane	22	+15	43	
4	Crackit City Polar	22	+16	42	
5	Mochudi Centre Chiefs	22	+7	34	
6	Ncojane YoungStars	22	+15	32	
7	Tlokweng United	22	+2	30	
8	Santos	22	−11	30	
9	Uri Black Forest	22	−2	26	
10	Matebejane	22	−7	26	
11	Broadhurst (R)	22	−30	15	Relegation
12	Black Rangers (R)	22	−43	4	Relegation

Source: Botswana Football Association

Rules for classification: 1) points; 2) goal difference; 3) number of goals scored.

(C) Champion; (P) Promoted; (R) Relegated
