= Pilane (Botswana) =

- Location in Botswana
- Coordinates: 24°24′24″S 26°5′12″E
- Country: Botswana
- District: Kgatleng District

Population (2001)
  - Total: 1,178

Pilane is a village in Kgatleng District of Botswana. It is located 10 km south-west of the district capital, Mochudi. The population was 1,178 in 2001 census.
