= Botswana First Division South =

Debswana First Division South
- Organising body: Botswana Football Association
- Founded: 1966
- Country: (Botswana)
- Confederation: CAF
- Number of clubs: 12
- Level on pyramid: 2
- Promotion to: Botswana Premier League
- Relegation to: Botswana Division One
- Domestic cup: FA Challenge Cup
- International cup: CAF Confederation Cup
- Current champions: Matebele FC (2022-23)
- Broadcaster(s): Maru TV, NOW TV
- Current: 2023-24 Botswana First Division South

For association football in Botswana, the Botswana First Division South (currently known as the Debswana First Division South due to sponsorship reasons) is the second-tier professional football league in Botswana. Founded in 1966 after Botswana was granted independence, it is administered by the Botswana Football Association and features teams from the southern part of the country.

== History ==
The league was founded in 1966 as an attempt by the BFA to stimulate grassroots football development and evenly spread the sport across the country. Although First Division teams are directly promoted to the top tier of Botswana football and also participate in the FA Challenge Cup, the winner of which qualifies to compete in the CAF Confederation Cup, an African continental competition equivalent to the UEFA Europa League, critics have claimed the league is not taken seriously enough. Cited as an example is the fact that the First Division South did not get a sponsor until 2013, 45 years into its existence, and lacks proper stadia unlike other second-tier leagues like South Africa's National First Division. In 2014 the league was rocked by a clash between BFA and the government over the issue of constituency tournaments. Constituency tournaments were introduced by the government in 2008 to combat social ills through sport. The BFA appealed to the government to terminate the tournaments as many First Division players were deserting their clubs to take part in the tournaments for a quick and slightly higher payout, violating BFA regulations. BFA also had a problem with the tournament being under government control and not their own as the Botswana football governing body. However, the government refused as constituency tournaments were seen as amateur competitions and not professional, and BFA appealed to FIFA to resolve the issue. After sending a delegation to Botswana on a fact-finding mission FIFA ruled that the administration of constituency tournaments be handed over to the BFA and threatened to ban Botswana if this was not done. Following months of discussions the constituency tournament format and rules were amended to meet FIFA standards and it was agreed that BFA would have a say in its running.

== Sponsorship ==
Since its inception in 1966 the First Division South has had only one sponsor. The sponsor has been able to determine the league's sponsorship name. Below is a list of all the sponsors to date:

- 2013–present: Debswana (Debswana First Division South)

== TV rights ==
On 27 June 2018 BFA signed a deal with Baboneng Film Productions to broadcast live First Division games, making Baboneng the first ever private company to broadcast First Division games. The groundbreaking deal was for P9 000 000 over five years commencing from the 2018–19 season and concluding in 2022–23. Baboneng agreed to pay P1 500 000 per season for the first two seasons and P2 000 000 per season afterwards. Any games that are not covered by Baboneng's MARU TV are to be broadcast by the state-owned youth channel NOW TV.

== Format ==
There are 12 teams in the First Division South. Matches are played in a double round robin format, meaning every team plays every other team twice in a season both home and away. Three points are awarded for a win, one for a draw and none for a loss. At the end of the season the team with most points is crowned champions and gains automatic promotion to the Botswana Premier League whereas the runners up go into the First Division promotional playoffs with the runners up of the First Division North. The team with the lowest points is relegated to the Division One league of their respective regional FA but the number of teams relegated depends on the number of southern teams relegated from the premier league. If only one southern team is relegated from the premier league then three teams are relegated from the First Division South to make space for both the relegated team and the two promoted from Division One via the Botswana Division One playoffs.

Where there is a tie of points goal difference is used to separate teams and determine log standings. First Division South games are generally played on weekend afternoons. Since there are next to no stadiums set aside for lower league use, First Division matches are played on dusty school grounds and other community spaces, resulting in the First Division being nicknamed 'ko leroleng' or 'at the dust'.

== FA Challenge Cup ==
The top eight teams in the First Division South automatically qualify to play in the FA Challenge Cup. Although no First Division South team has ever won the competition, they see it as an opportunity to market their players and attract attention through shocking 'giant-killing' victories over premier league teams. First Division South teams like Mokgosi Young Fighters and Jwaneng Comets (now Jwaneng Galaxy) have also previously played in the FA Cup final.

== Past seasons ==
Season	Winner	Runner-up	Relegated at end of season	Promoted at end of season
199-00	Wonder Sporting	BMC	Black Mamba; Tonela Highways; Debswana Young Stars	Cosmos Blizzards; Tlokweng United
2000-01	Wonder Sporting	Gaborone United	Tlokweng United; Desert Nxau	
2001-02	BMC	Gaborone United	Sharpsville; Kanye Southern Pirates	Debswana Young Stars
2003-04	Township Rollers			
2005-06	Uniao Flamengo Santos	Jwaneng Comets	Sharps Shooting Stars; Maletamotse	Kgabosetso Southern Callies; Wonder Sporting
2011-12	Letlapeng			
2012-13	Wonder Sporting	Jwaneng Comets	Gabane United; Kanye Swallows	
2013-14	Letlapeng	Tsholofelo Rolling Boys		
2014-15	Jwaneng Galaxy	Mogoditshane Fighters		Black Rangers; Mochudi Rovers
2015-16	Black Forest			
2016-17	Sharps Shooting Stars	Uniao Flamengo Santos		
2017-18	Notwane	Prisons XI		
2018-19	Gilport Lions	Jwaneng Fighters	Black Rangers; Modipane United; Blue Stars	Holy Ghost; Ncojane Young Stars
2019-20	Masitaoka	Mogoditshane Fighters		
2020-21	No Champion awarded due to COVID-19			
2021-22				
2022-23	Matebele FC	VTM FC	Broadhurst; Black Rangers	
2023-24				
2024-25	Santa Green			

== Manager records ==
League winning managers

Season	Winner	Manager
2003-04	Township Rollers	(Botswana) Joseph Panene
2016-17	Sharps Shooting Stars	(Botswana) Rapelang Tsatsilebe
2017-18	Notwane	(Botswana) Kakale Mabechu
2018-19	Gilport Lions	(Zimbabwe) Mandivenga Paradzayo

== Clubs ==
The following clubs were in the league during the 2022/23 season:

Club	City / Town
Black Rangers	Tsabong
Broadhurst	Gaborone
Crackit City Polar	Gaborone
Matebejane	Mogoditshane
Matebele FC	Matebeleng
Mochudi Centre Chiefs	Mochudi
Ncojane YoungStars	Jwaneng
Notwane FC	Gaborone
Santos	Gabane
Tlokweng United	Tlokweng
Uri Black Forest	Gaborone
VTM FC	Gaborone

== See also ==
- Football in Botswana
