= Mmathubudukwane =

Coordinates: 24°36′33″S 26°26′16″E

Location of Mmathubudukwane

Mmathubudukwane is a village in Kgatleng District of Botswana.

== Location ==
The village is located 60 km east of Gaborone, close to the border with South Africa.

== Healthcare ==
It has a health clinic.

== Population ==
The population was 2,049 in 2001 census.
