= Dikwididi =

- Location in Botswana
- Coordinates: 24°35′47″S 26°13′9″E
- Country: Botswana
- District: Kgatleng District

Population (2011)
  - Total: 225

Dikwididi is a village in Kgatleng District of Botswana. It is located around 40 km east of Gaborone. The village has a primary school and the population was 225 in 2011 census.
