= Central South Regional Football Association Division One League =

Central South Regional Football Association Division One
- Organising body: Central South Regional Football Association
- Founded: 1966
- Country: Botswana
- Region: Mahalapye
- Number of clubs: 17
- Level on pyramid: 3
- Promotion to: Botswana First Division North
- Relegation to: CSRFA Division Two
- Domestic cup: FA Cup
- Current champions: Santa Green (2018-19) (3rd title)
- Current: 2018-19 CSRFA Division One

The Central South Regional Football Association Division One League, also known as the CSRFA Division One, is one of the regional leagues that make up the third tier of Botswana football. It is administered by the Central South Regional Football Association and features teams from in and around Mahalapye.

== Clubs ==
List of clubs in the 2019-20 CSRFA Division One:

- Queens Park Rangers (Mahalapye)
- Covenant (Mahalapye)
- Kalamare United (Kalamare)
- K12 Real (Kalamare)
- Tshikinyega Tigers (Mahalapye)
- Mafia Stars (Mahalapye)
- Desmo Royals (Mahalapye)
- Shoshong United (Shoshong)
- Boston FC (Mahalapye)
- Mahalapye United Hotspurs (Mahalapye)
- Rolling Guys (Mahalapye)
- Masterpiece (Mahalapye)
- Sports Varsity (Mahalapye)
- Man Machine (Kalamare)
- Matsubutsubu (Shoshong)

== Past seasons ==
Season	Winners	Runners-up	Relegated at end of season	Promoted at end of season
2016-17	Santa Green			
2017-18	Santa Green			
2018-19	Santa Green			

== Manager records ==
Season	Winner	Manager
2016-17	Santa Green	(Botswana) Kutlwano Sephatla
2017-18	Santa Green	(Botswana) Kutlwano Sephatla
2018-19	Santa Green	(Botswana) Kutlwano Sephatla
