= Tsabong Regional Football Association Division One League =

Tsabong Regional Football Association Division One
- Organising body: Tsabong Regional Football Association
- Founded: 1966
- Country: Botswana
- Region: Tsabong
- Number of clubs: 9
- Level on pyramid: 3
- Promotion to: Botswana First Division South
- Relegation to: Tsabong Division Two
- Domestic cup: FA Cup
- Current champions: King Rodgers (2018–19)
- Current: 2018-19 Tsabong Division One

The Tsabong Regional Football Association Division One League, also known as the Tsabong Division One and formerly as Kgalagadi South Regional Football Association Division One, is one of the regional leagues that make up the third tier of Botswana football. It is administered by the Tsabong Regional Football Association and features teams from in and around Tsabong.

The Tsabong Division One was not played from 2007 until it was revived by former Botswana Football Association president Tebogo Sebego in 2012.

== Past seasons ==
Season	Winners	Runners-up	Relegated at end of season	Promoted at end of season
2016–17	Black Rangers			
2017–18				
2018–19	King Rodgers			
2021-22	Desert Nxau			
