= Chobe Regional Football Association Division One League =

Football league in Botswana

Chobe Regional Football Association Division One
- Organising body: Chobe Regional Football Association
- Founded: 1966
- Country: Botswana
- Region: Chobe
- Number of clubs: 13
- Level on pyramid: 3
- Promotion to: Botswana First Division North
- Relegation to: CHORFA Division Two
- Domestic cup: FA Cup
- Current champions: Chobe United (2018-19) (5th title)
- Most championships: Chobe United (5 titles)
- Current: 2018-19 CHORFA Division One

The Chobe Regional Football Association Division One League, also known as the CHORFA Division One, is one of the regional leagues that make up the third tier of Botswana football. It is administered by the Chobe Regional Football Association and features teams from Chobe region.

== Past seasons ==
Season	Winners	Runners-up	Relegated at end of season	Promoted at end of season
2017-18	Kazungula Young Fighters			
2018-19	Chobe United			
