= Phuthadikobo Museum =

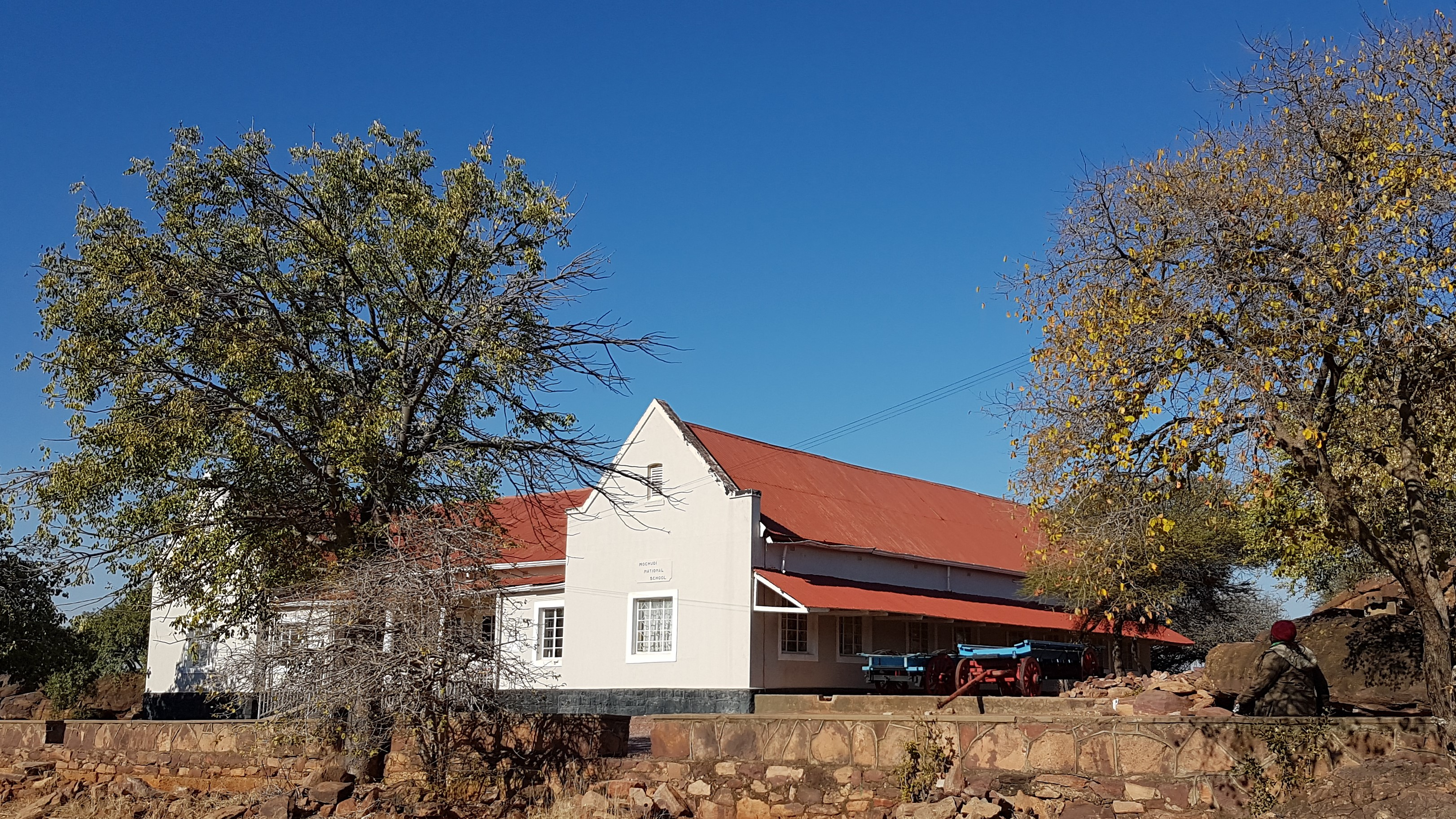
- Museum building
- Established: 1975
- Location: Phuthadikobo Hill, Kgosing Ward, Mochudi, Botswana
- Coordinates: 24.3878°S 26.1521°E
- Type: Archaeology, Archives, Photographic, Ethnographic, Art Gallery
- Director: Vincent Phemelo Rapoo
- Website: www.kgaboprecincts.org

The Phuthadikobo Museum is a historic building of architectural interest and the museum has a range of displays, a craft shop and a silkscreen printing workshop which are unique to Africa. It is a museum, cultural centre and silkscreen workshop all forming a community development programme – providing all its participants with a place to learn and work since 1975. The emphasis is on the local life, traditions and design of Bakgatla.

== History ==
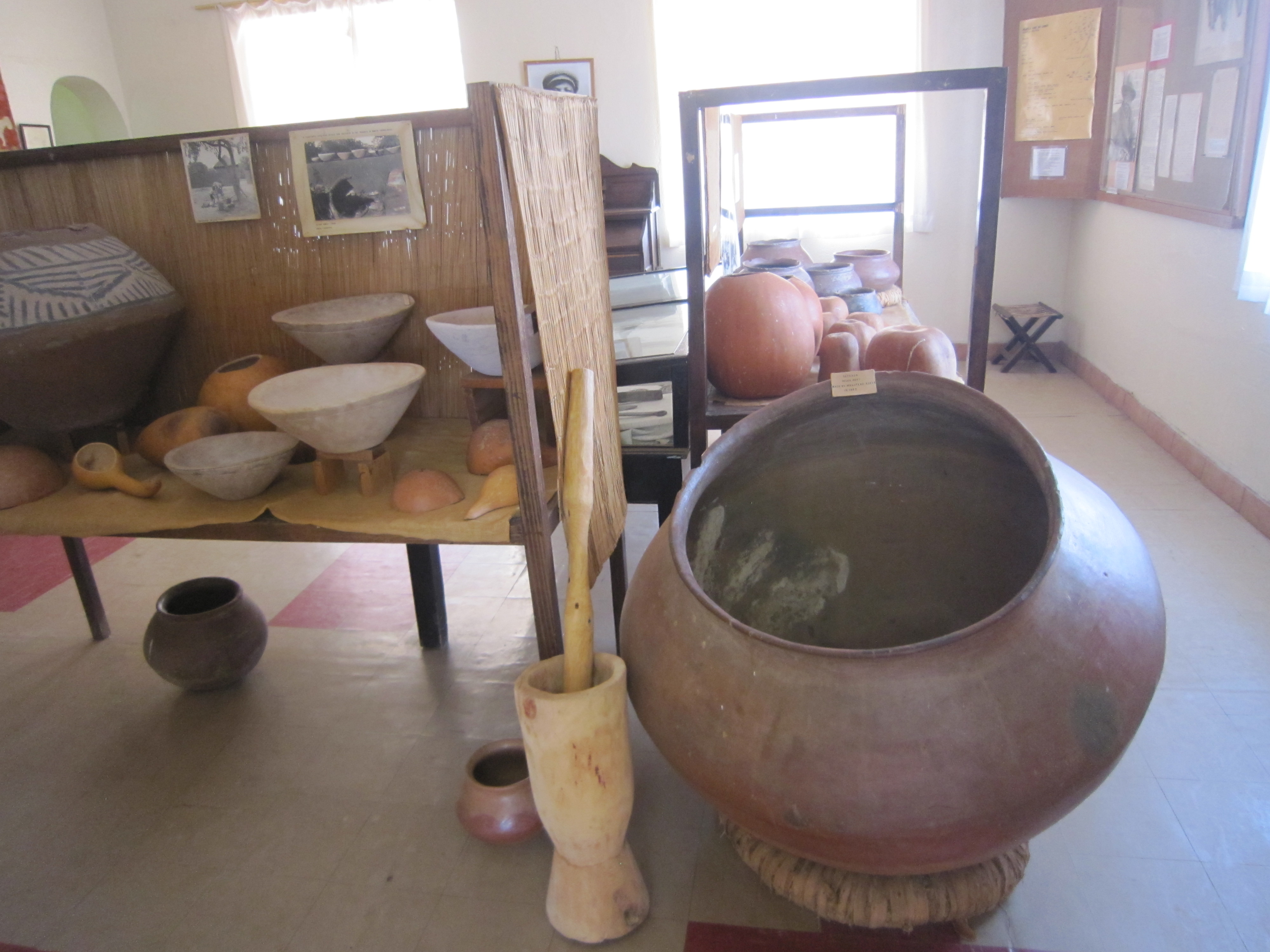
Museum exhibits

The proposal to establish a district museum in Mochudi was first approved by the District Council and District Development Committee in 1972. No firm steps to initiate such a project, however, were taken until the end of 1975 when the district council indicated that it was prepared to make available the abandoned Isang School building to any private group which was prepared to convert it into some kind of community education center, further it indicated its strong wish that this center should incorporate the district museum.

With the enthusiastic Bakgatla late King, Kgosi Linchwe II, an ad hoc committee was quickly formed which began to discuss the nature of a possible project and the new opportunity that had been created by the council’s offer. At a meeting of 17.12.75 the new committee informed the council that it was prepared to accept its offer and outline its thinking about the project. The council made it clear that the project would have its full support, that it was only able to provide minimal financial assistance, and that it would like the project to be administered by an independent trust.

== Governance ==
The museum is administered through a board of trustees. The day-to-day responsibilities of the museum are handled by the Director who is also the chief curator and other museum staff members.

== Museum building ==
The old school was built on a 480 sq. meter building constructed on a U plan around a central courtyard. The main building comprised eight classrooms, a central assembly hall which had been partitioned to provide an additional two classrooms, and a small storeroom. The classrooms have been converted into display rooms, the museum shop and the workshop where screen prints are made. The site is placed on top of Phuthadikobo Hill with views of the village and the surrounding terrain and has space available for landscaping and future developments.

The school was built from 1921-1923, under the direction of the tribal regent Kgosi Isang Pilane and was the first attempt anywhere in Botswana to take education beyond the very elementary levels provided for in mission schools. The significance of this very ambitious undertaking and the thinking that underlay it were described by Isang in 1933 when outlining the position of the tribe as he found it on taking over as regent in 1921:

“I found that there were already an accumulated number of problems facing the people owing to the change that has taken place around them and their inability to adapt themselves to these changes. It was quite apparent to me from the beginning that if any reform was to be introduced to adapt ourselves as a tribe to the new world conditions, the people must have some insight of the world around them, understand the forces that encircle them closer and closer as time goes on, and enable them to react to these forces. This understanding was lacking and was, in fact, conspicuous by its absence. It became quite obvious that this understanding must be instilled and with the greatest possible speed.”

== Departments ==
Units that work with each other in the project include Archaeology (heritage Sites), Education (tours), Archive (Archive development), Research (Intangible Cultural Heritage) and Art Gallery (Arts and Crafts).
