= Matebeleng =

- Location in Botswana
- Coordinates: 24°32′31″S 26°2′23″E
- Country: Botswana
- District: Kgatleng District

Population (2001)
  - Total: 1,180

Matebeleng, also known as Matebele (Ndebele) is a village in Kgatleng District of Botswana. It is located around 20 km north-east of Gaborone and the population was 1,180 in 2001 census.
