= Mabuse Pule =

Motswana politician

Deputy Minister of Local Government and Rural Development of Botswana
- In office 13 February 2022 – 1 November 2024
- President: Mokgweetsi Masisi

Personal details
- Born: Botswana
- Party: Botswana Democratic Party

Mabuse Pule is a Motswana politician and educator. He is the former Deputy Minister of Local Government and Rural Development in Botswana, having been appointed to the position in 2019 by the Former President of Botswana, Mokgweetsi Masisi.

Awards and achievements
Preceded by	Deputy Minister of Local Government and Rural Development of Botswana	Succeeded by
