= Kalamare =

Coordinates: 22°56′5″S 26°34′21″E

- Central District
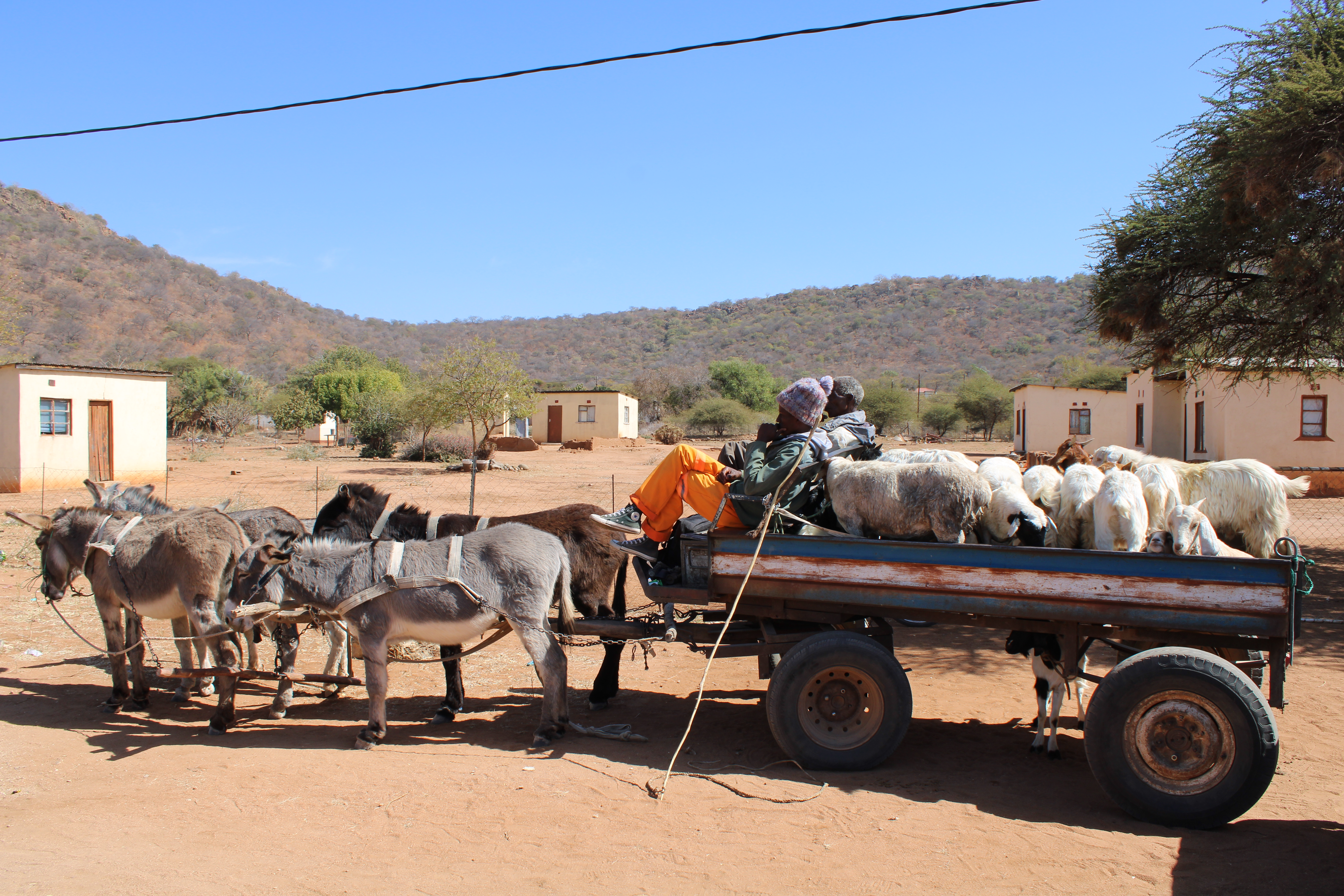
- Donkey Cart carrying goats in Kalamare.
- Interactive map of Kalamare

Population
  - Total: 2,241 in 2,001 census.

Location of Kalamare

Kalamare is a village in Central District of Botswana. It is located 35 km north-west of Mahalapye. The village has primary called Kalamare Primary School and Kalamare Junior Secondary School and a health clinic. The population was 2,241 in 2001 census.
