= Nhabe Regional Football Association Division One League =

Nhabe Regional Football Association Division One
- Organising body: Nhabe Regional Football Association
- Founded: 1966
- Country: Botswana
- Region: Nhabe
- Number of clubs: 13
- Level on pyramid: 3
- Promotion to: Botswana First Division North
- Relegation to: NRFA Division Two
- Domestic cup: FA Cup
- Current champions: Maun United Terrors (2018-19)
- Current: 2018-19 NRFA Division One

The Nhabe Regional Football Association Division One League, also known as the NRFA Division One, is one of the regional leagues that make up the third tier of Botswana football. It is administered by the Nhabe Regional Football Association and features teams from in and around Maun. Sankoyo Bush Bucks is the only team in the league's history to play in the Botswana Premier League

== Past seasons ==
Season	Winners	Runners-up	Relegated at end of season	Promoted at end of season
2011-12	Sankoyo Bush Bucks	CTO		
2017-18	Maun United Terrors			
2018-19	Maun United Terrors			
