= Botswana Division One playoffs =

- Founded: 1966
- Region: Botswana
- Number of teams: 17 (4 teams each for the North, East and West blocks, 5 for the South)
- 2019 Botswana Division One playoffs

The Botswana Division One playoffs are a series of annual association football matches played to determine the teams which get promoted to the Botswana First Division North and South. It involves the seventeen regional champions. These teams meet in a series of playoffs and block winners are promoted to either the First Division North or South depending on their geographical location. The playoffs were introduced in 1966 and have been played at the end of every season since. Eleven Angels, Palapye All-Stars, Blue Stars and Jwaneng Fighters are the current champions.

== Format ==
The seventeen regional champions are divided geographically into four groups or blocks. The north, west and east blocks each comprise four teams, whereas the south block is made up of five. Every year one of the participating teams is asked to host the playoffs of their specific regional block.

Matches are played in a single round robin format, with each team playing every other once. Three points are awarded for a win, one for a draw and none for a loss. At the end of the playoffs the team with the most points is promoted to the First Division. If there is a tie of points goal difference is used and if that is also equal then various tiebreaker methods such as goals scored, fair conduct and a sudden death round are used. Until 2015 the regional block champions progressed to final playoffs along with the runners-up, at the end of which only two teams were promoted to the first division as compared to four under the current format.

== Past winners ==
Year	North block	East block	South block	West block
2018	Eleven Angels	Palapye All-Stars	Jwaneng Fighters	Blue Stars
2019	Maun United Terrors	Santa Green	Holy Ghost	Ncojane Young Stars
2020		Peacemakers	Master Blackpool	
2022	Mbalakalungu	Rolling Guys	VTM	Black Rangers
