= Modipane =

- Nickname: Modville
- Location in Botswana
- Coordinates: 24°37′13″S 26°7′23″E
- Country: Botswana
- District: Kgatleng District

Population (2022)
  - Total: 7,945

Modipane is a village in Kgatleng District of Botswana. The village is located 25 km east of Gaborone, close to the border with South Africa and has a primary school. The population was 2,423 in the 2001 census, and had grown to 7,945 by 2022.
