= Kgatleng District =

Kgatleng
- District
- Location within Botswana
- Coordinates: 24°15′S 26°30′E
- Country: Botswana
- Capital: Mochudi

Area
  - Total: 7,960 km^{2} (3,070 sq mi)

Population (2022 census)
  - Total: 121,882
  - Density: 15.3/km^{2} (39.7/sq mi)
- Time zone: UTC+2 (Central Africa Time)
- HDI (2017): 0.733 high · 3rd

Kgatleng is one of the districts of Botswana, coterminous with the homeland of the Bakgatla people. Its capital is Mochudi, the hometown of protagonist Precious Ramotswe in Alexander McCall Smith's popular The No. 1 Ladies' Detective Agency series. According to the 2001 Census, Kgatleng had a population of 73,507.

Kgatleng borders the North West Province of South Africa in the south, and to the east it borders South Africa's Limpopo Province. Domestically, it borders South-East District in the southwest, Kweneng District in the west, and Central District in the north.

As of 2022, the total population of the district was 121,882 compared to 91,660 in 2011. The growth rate of the population during the decade was 2.73. The total number of workers constituted 25,130 with 13,278 males and 11,853 females in 2011, with a majority involved in agriculture. The district is administered by a district administration and district council which are responsible for local administration.

Local tourist attractions are Oodi weavers and the Matsieng Footprints.

== Geography ==
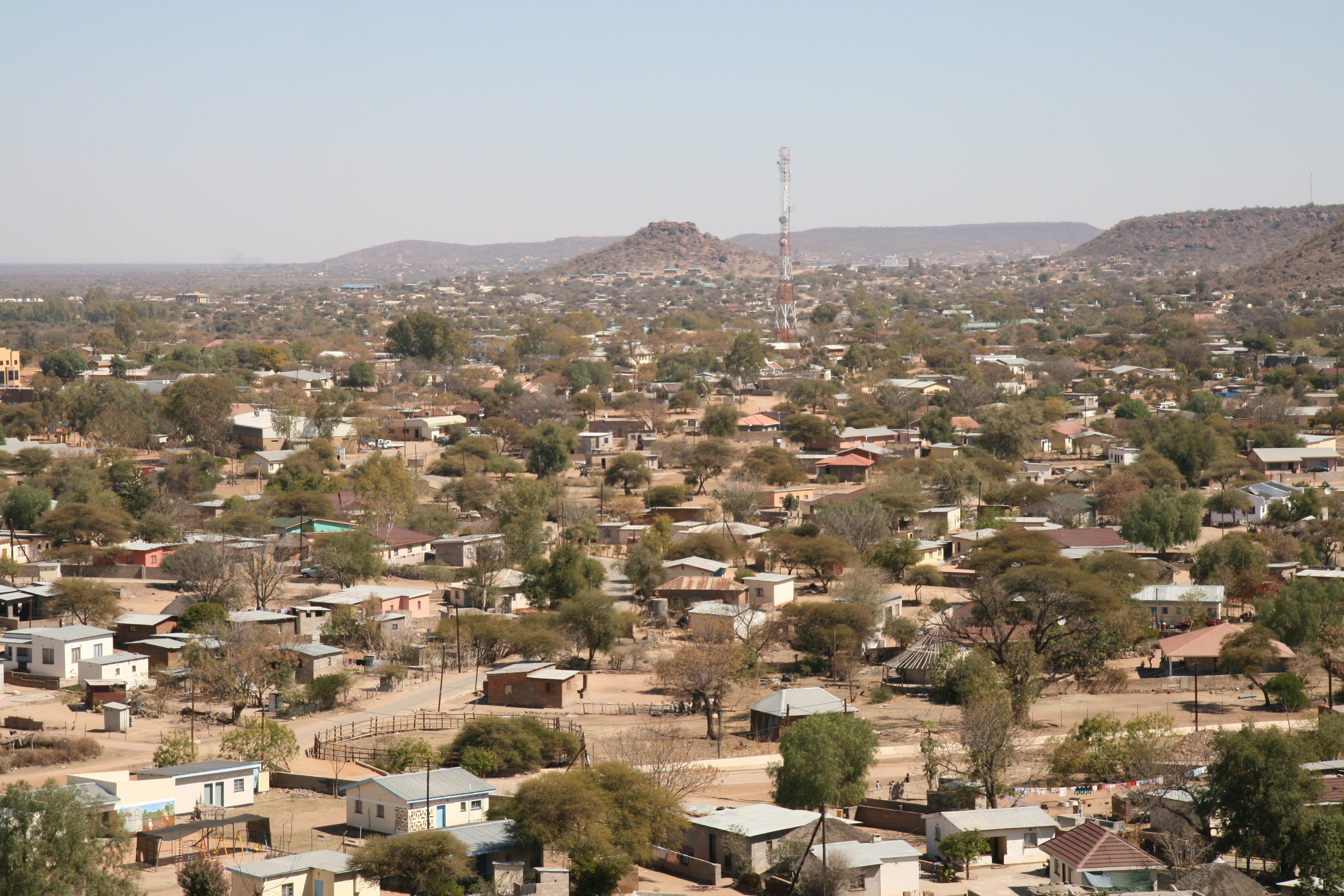
Mochudi village in the district

Kgatleng borders the North West Province of South Africa in the south, and to the east it borders South Africa's Limpopo Province. Domestically, it borders the South-East District in the southwest, Kweneng District in the west, and Central District in the north.

Most of Botswana has tableland slopes sliding from east to west. The region has an average elevation of around 915 m (3,002 ft) above the mean sea level. The vegetation type is Savannah, with tall grasses, bushes and trees. The annual precipitation is around 55 cm (22 in), most of which is received during the summer season from November to May. Most of the rivers in the region are seasonal and are prone to flash floods.

== Demographics ==
Historical population
Year	Pop.	±%
1981	44,461	—
1991	57,770	+29.9%
2001	73,507	+27.2%
2011	91,660	+24.7%
2022	121,882	+33.0%

As of 2011, the total population of the district was 91,660 compared to 73,507 in 2001. The growth rate of population during the decade was 2.23. The population in the district was 4.53 per cent of the total population in the country. The sex ratio stood at 94.63 for every 100 males, compared to 94.60 in 2001. The average household size was 2.96 in 2011 compared to 4.29 in 2001.

There were 3,690 craft and related workers, 1,708 clerks, 6,031 people working in elementary occupation 457 legislators, administrators & managers 1,477 plant & machine operators and assemblers, 741 professionals, 2,171 service workers, shop & market sales workers, 1,237 skilled agricultural & related workers, and 1,482 technicians and associated professionals, making the total work force 19,167.

== Education and economy ==
As of 2011, there were a total of 38 schools in the district, with 1.70 per cent private schools. The total number of students in the council schools was 13,882 while it was 562 in private schools. The total number of students enrolled in the district was 14,444 constituting 6,963 girls and 7,481 boys. The total number of qualified teachers was 621 with 486 females and 135 males. There were around 034 temporary teachers, 15 male and 49 female. There were no untrained teachers in the district.

As of 2006, 7,216 were involved in agriculture, 1,264 in construction, 3,362 in education, 177 in electricity & water, 410 in finance, 709 in health, 658 in hotels & restaurants, 1,397 in manufacturing, 057 in mining and quarrying, 554 in other community services, 1,059 in private households, 2,598 in public administration, 1,014 in real estate, 952 in transport & communications and 3,703 in wholesale & retail trade. The total number of workers constituted 25,130 with 13,278 males and 11,853 females.

Tourist attractions in the region are Oodi weavers and the Matsieng Footprints.

== Administration ==
Botswana gained independence from the British in 1966 and adapted the colonial administration framework to form its district administration. The policies were modified during 1970-74 to address some of the basic issues. The district is administered by a district administration and district council which are responsible for local administration. The policies for the administration are framed by the Ministry of Local Government. The major activities of the council are tribal administration, remote area development and local governance. The executive powers of the council are vested on a commissioner appointed by the central government.

The technical services wing of the Department of Local Government is responsible for developing roads, infrastructure in villages like water supply, schools and recreational facilities.

All the staff of the local administration expect District Administration are selected via Unified Local Government Services (ULGS), and the Ministry of Local Government is responsible for their training, deployment and career development.

The district has no sub-districts.

== See also ==
- Sub-districts of Botswana
