= Mochudi =

Village in Botswana

- Village
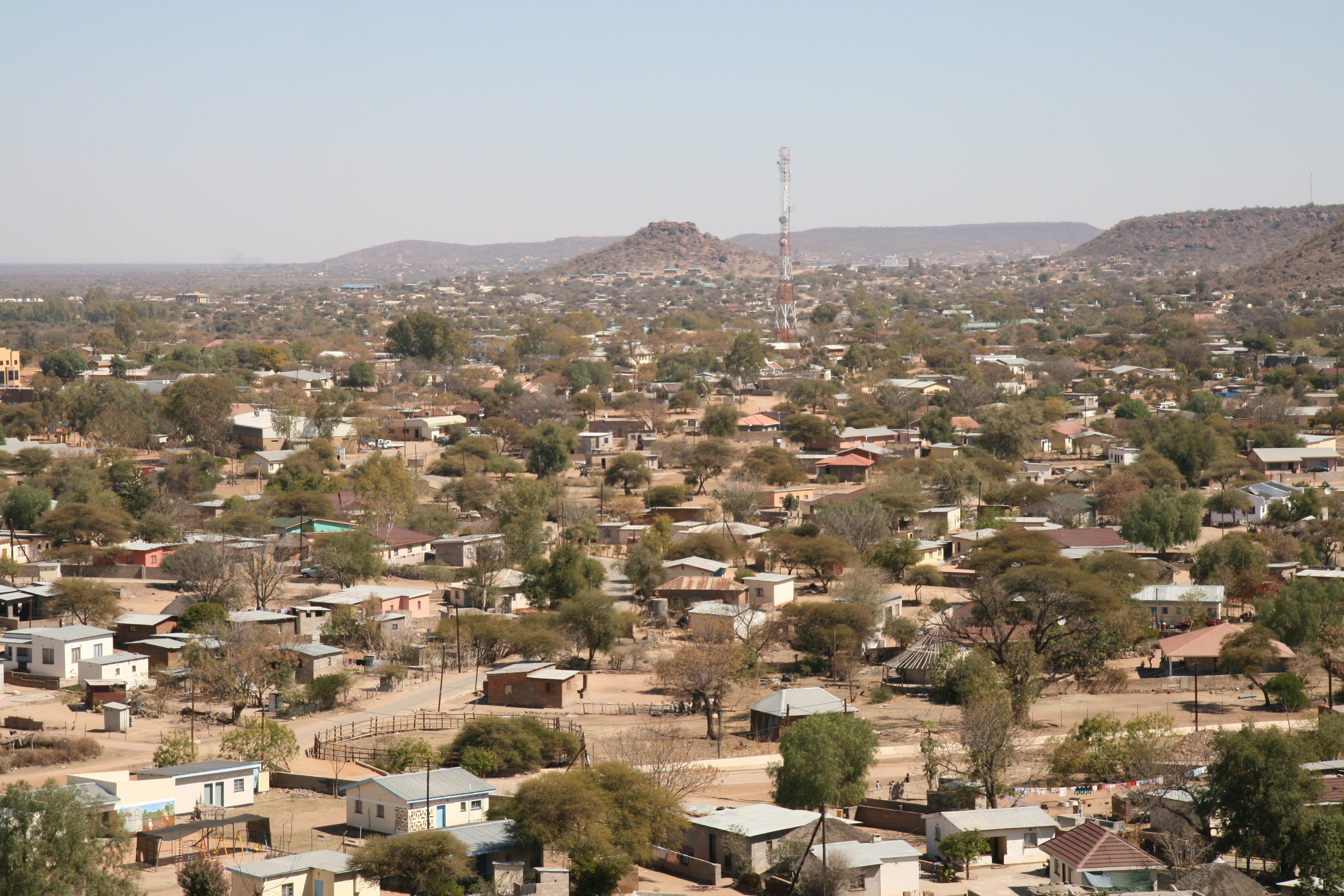
- View of Mochudi from a church bell tower

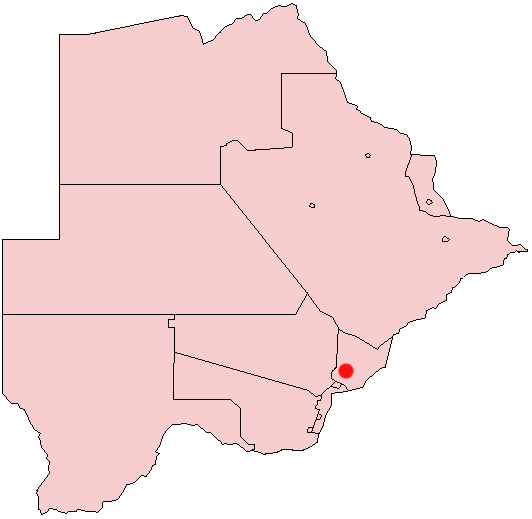

- Location within Botswana
- Coordinates: 24°25′S 26°09′E
- Country: Botswana
- District: Kgatleng District
- Settled: 1871
- Elevation: 938 m (3,077 ft)

Population (2022)
  - Total: 50,321
- Time zone: GMT +2
- Climate: BSh

Mochudi is one of the larger villages in Botswana with a population of 50,321 people in 2022. It is situated in the Bakgatla tribal region, in Kgatleng District, about 37 km (23 mi) northeast of Gaborone. The village lies several kilometres from the main Gaborone–Francistown road (A1 road), and can be accessed through a short turn at Pilane. Mochudi was settled by the Tswana people in 1871. The main attraction in Mochudi is the Phuthadikobo Museum which is perched at the top of a hill and holds a rich history of Bakgatla tribe and Batswana in general.

== History ==
Mochudi was established as a result of people movements. Under pressure from Boer encroachment on their historic lands, the Bakgatla tribe migrated from what is now South Africa, settling in 1871 at the foot of Phuthadikobo Hill and beside the Notwane River. At this time, the Rev Pieter Brink of the Dutch Reformed Church founded a mission station at Mochudi.

== Tourism ==
The tourist destinations of note inside Mochudi are the Phuthadikobo Museum at the top of the hill, which contains old photographs and historical texts relating to Mochudi and the history of the Bakgatla people. It is housed in a building that was originally the first school of Mochudi. Nearby is the hulk of the first tractor owned by a Motswana and huge footprints that legend says belongs to "Matsieng", a giant and ancestor of the Tswana, who led his people and the animals from the centre of the earth to inhabit the world.

Mochudi is known for its traditional painted houses and still has a traditional kgotla (tribal meeting place).

Mochudi was the birthplace of Mma Ramotswe, the heroine of the No. 1 Ladies' Detective Agency series of books. Michelle Obama visited the village during U.S. President Obama's African tour in 2011.

== Education ==
Mochudi has several public Junior Secondary Schools and one public high school, Molefi Senior Secondary School. Several junior schools are Linchwe II JSS, Kgamanyane JSS, Radikolo JSS, Bakgatle JSS, Sedibelo JSS, and Ithuteng JSS. There is also Podulogong Rehabilitation Centre that offers hands on training courses to blind or vision impaired individuals.

== Sports ==
Mochudi is home to Botswana Premier League soccer club Mochudi Centre Chiefs. Mochudi Rugby Club is a local rugby team based in the village.

== Twin city ==
- (Namibia) Otjiwarongo
