= List of busiest airports in India =

India's busiest airports is the list of the top fifty busiest commercially operational airports in the country. The tables below contain the busiest airports ranked by the following parameters as per the data published by Airports Authority of India.

1. Total passenger traffic (in number of persons) - includes any passenger that arrives at, departs from or is on a transit from that airport
2. Total aircraft movements (in airplane-times) - includes all the takeoffs and landings of all kinds of aircraft in scheduled or charter conditions
3. Total cargo handled (in metric tonnes) - includes all the freight and mail that arrives at or departs from the airport
Top 10 busiest airports in 2025-26
Top 10 busiest airports in India

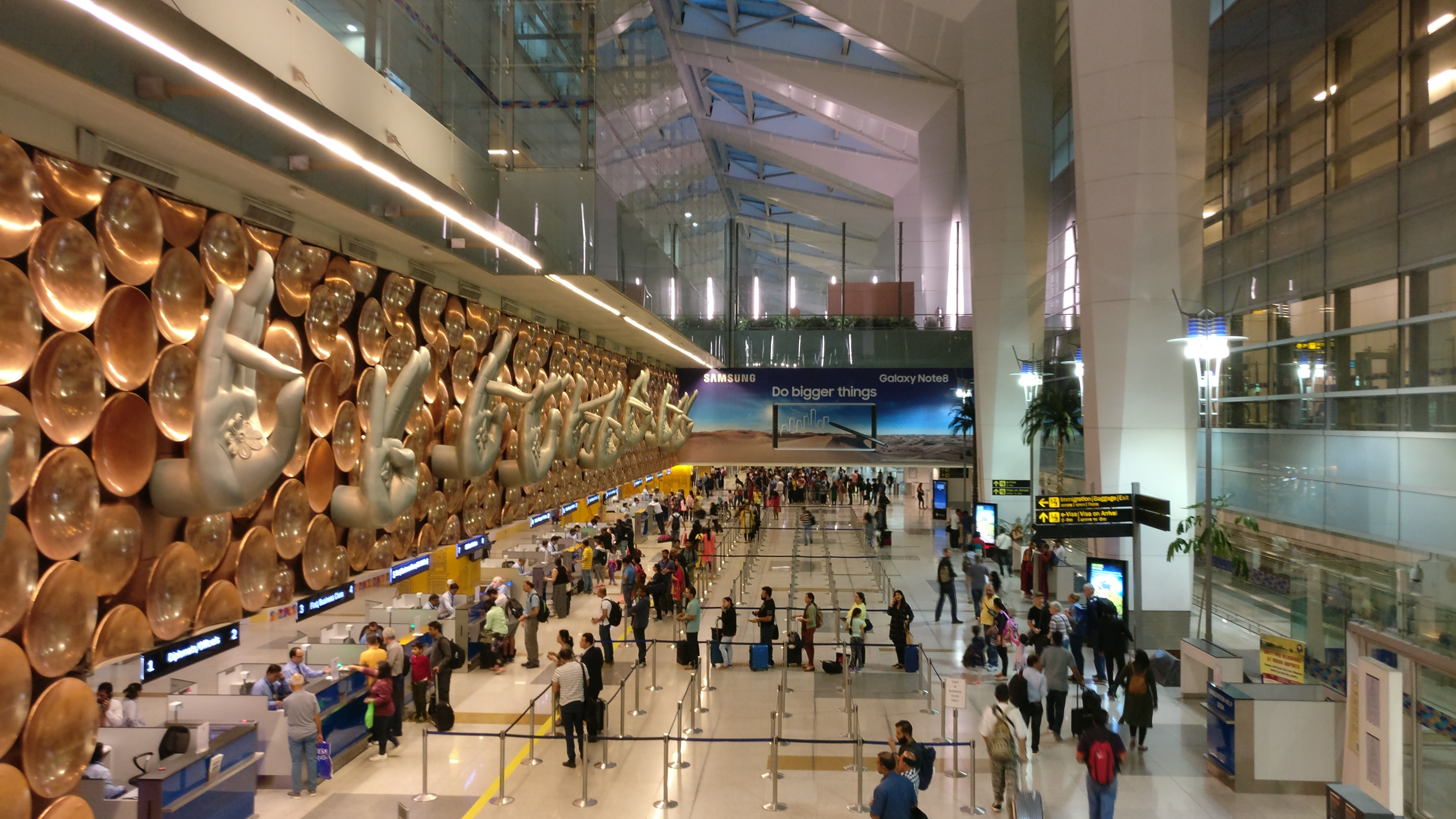
Indira Gandhi International Airport (Delhi)

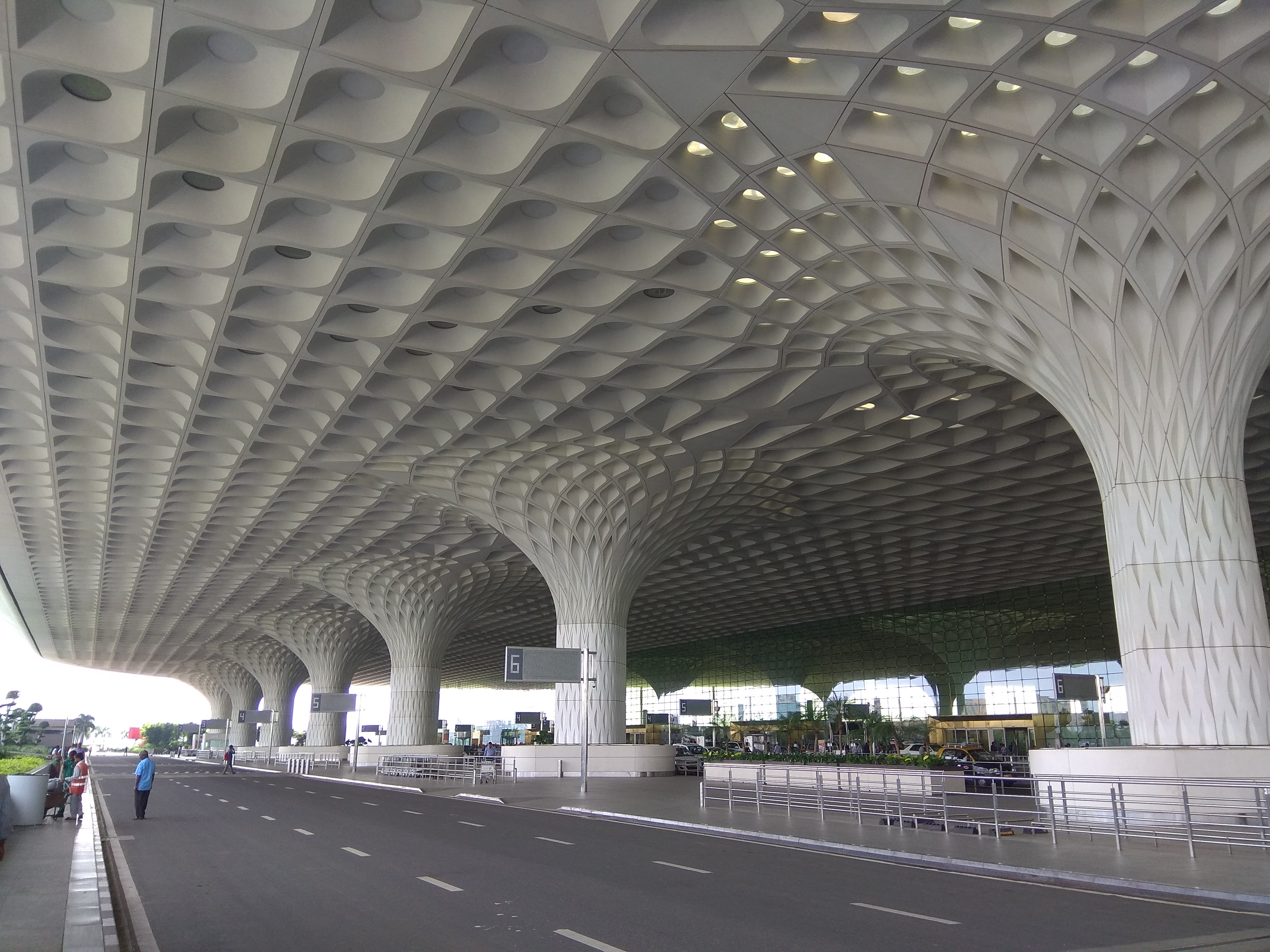
Chhatrapati Shivaji Maharaj International Airport (Mumbai)

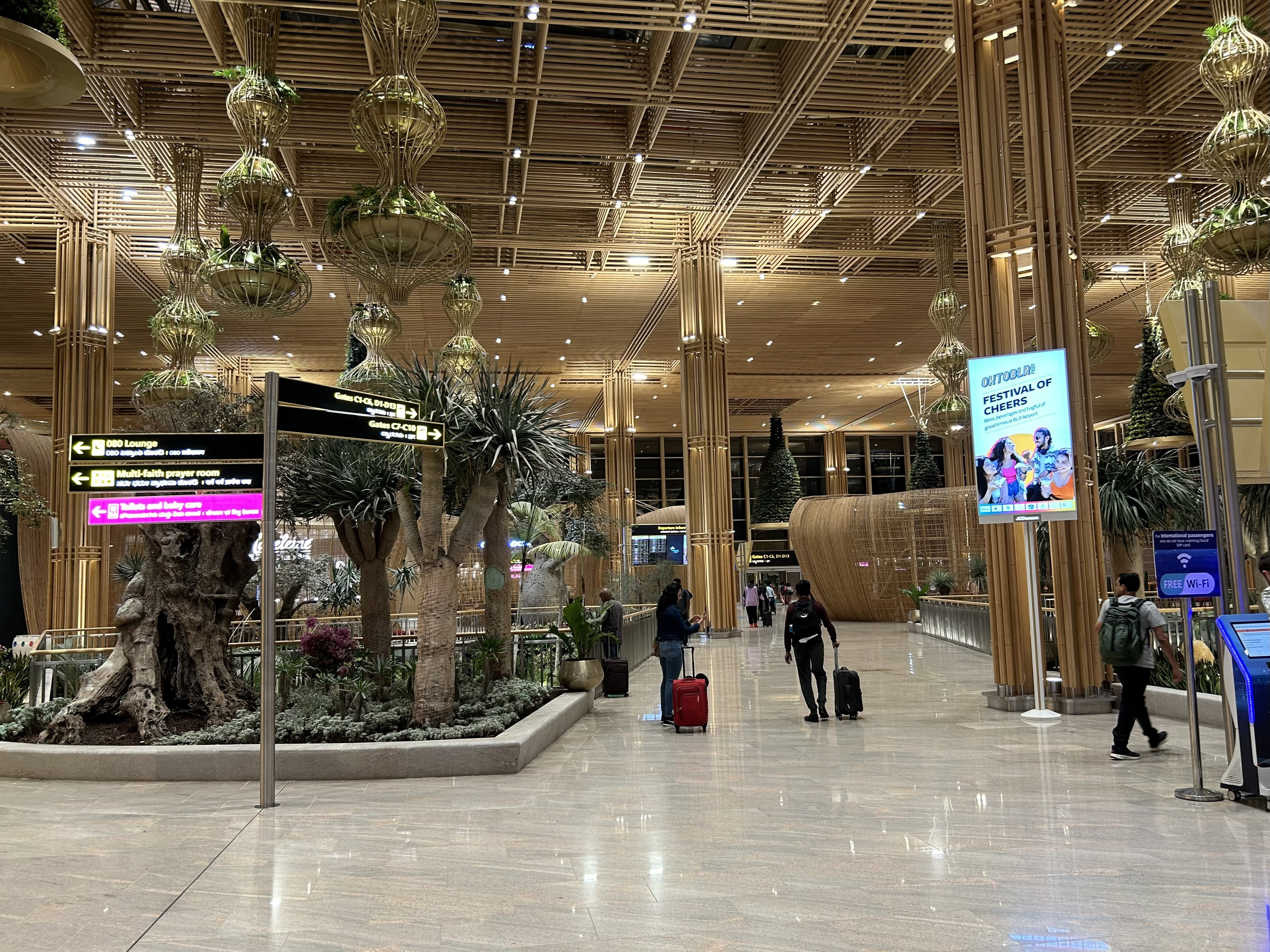
Kempegowda International Airport (Bengaluru)

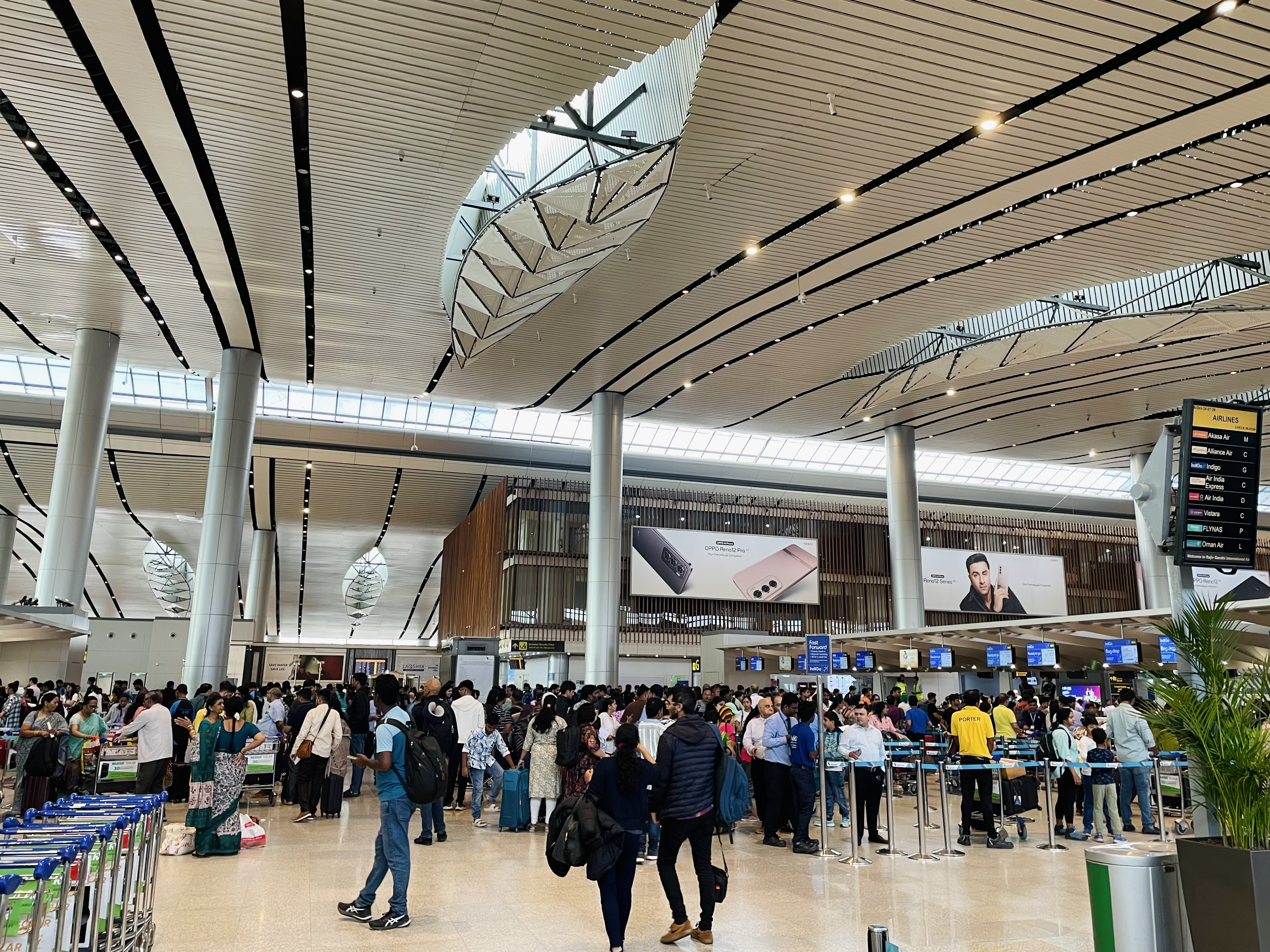
Rajiv Gandhi International Airport (Hyderabad)

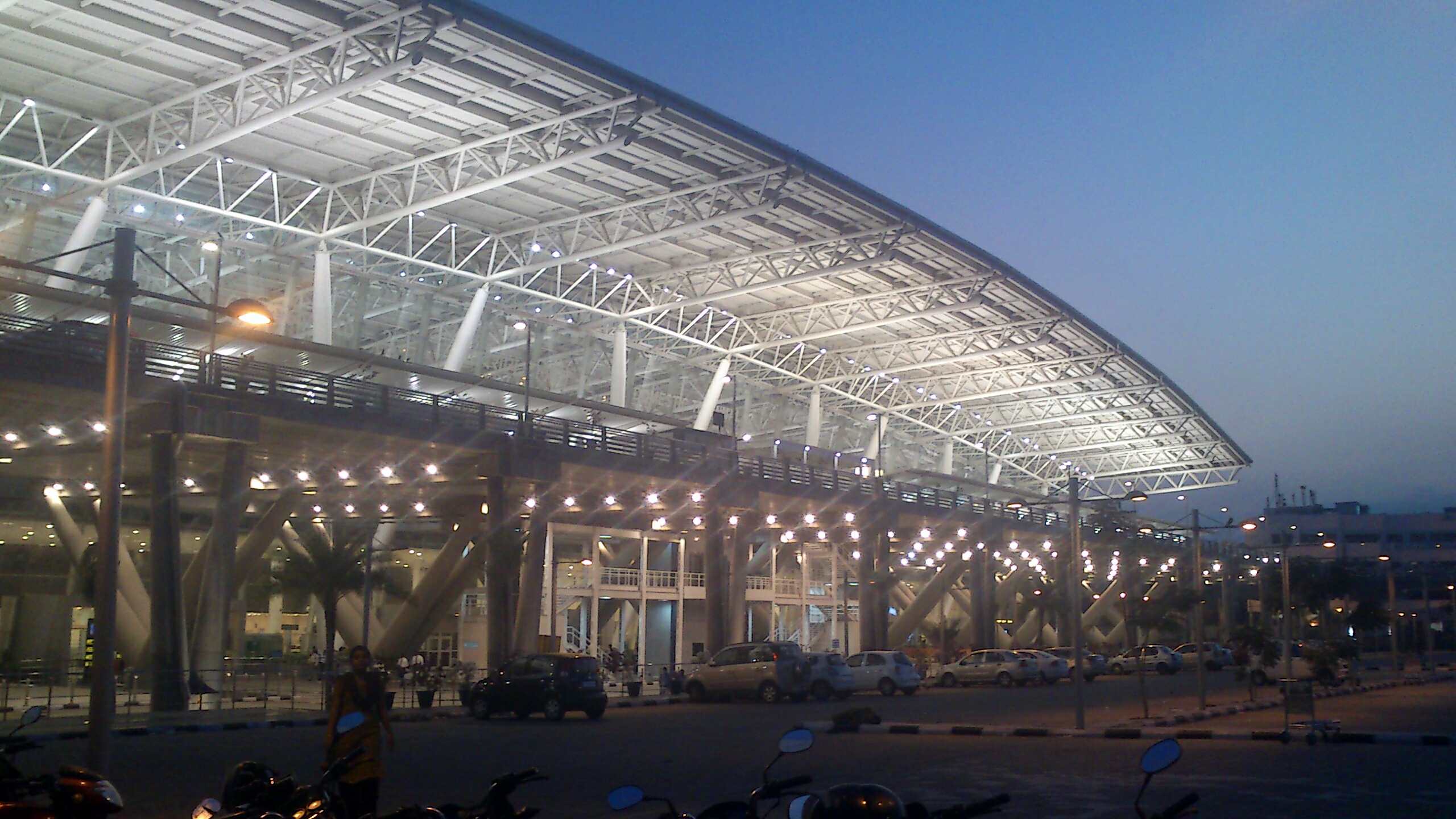
Chennai International Airport

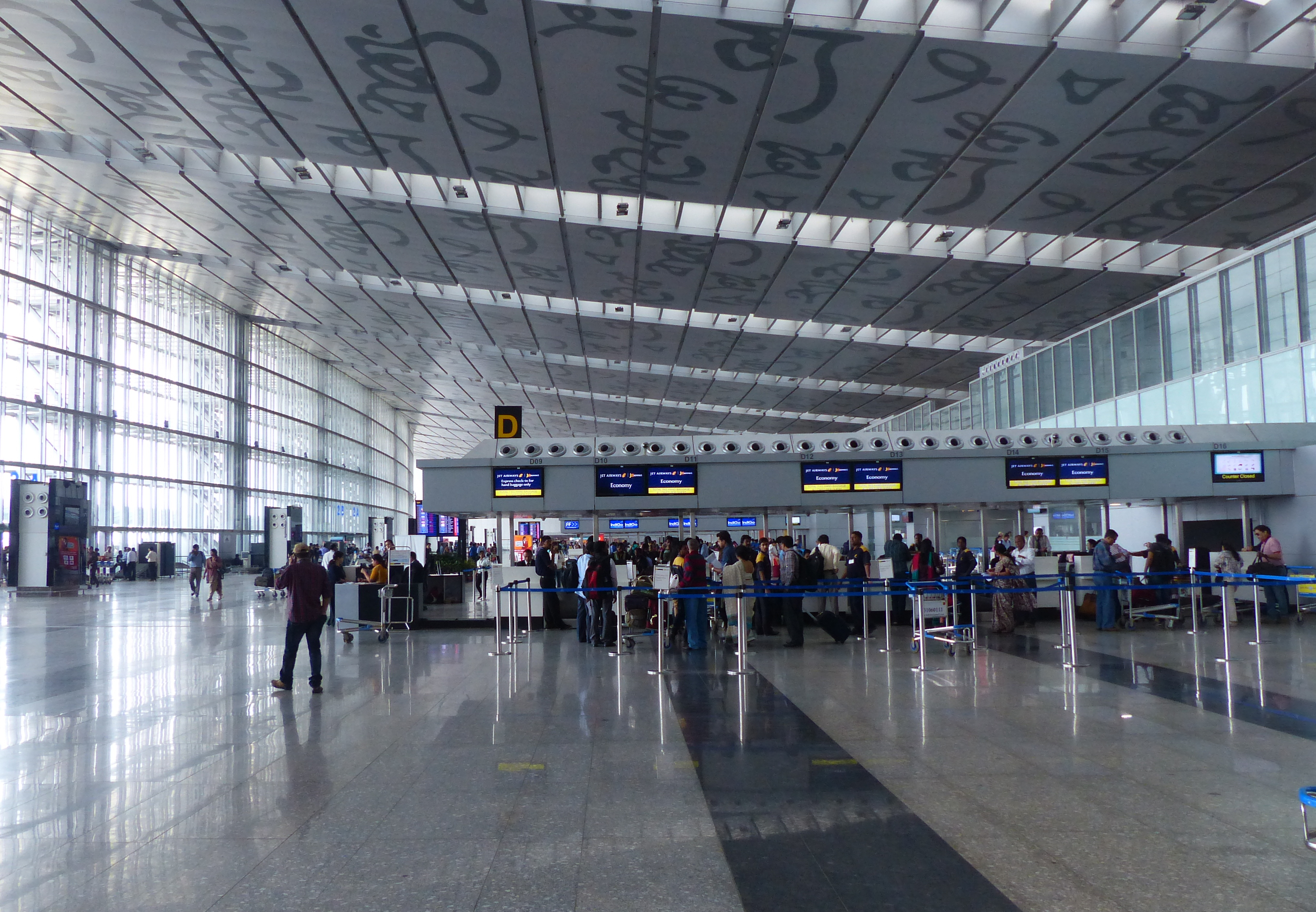
Netaji Subhas Chandra Bose International Airport (Kolkata)

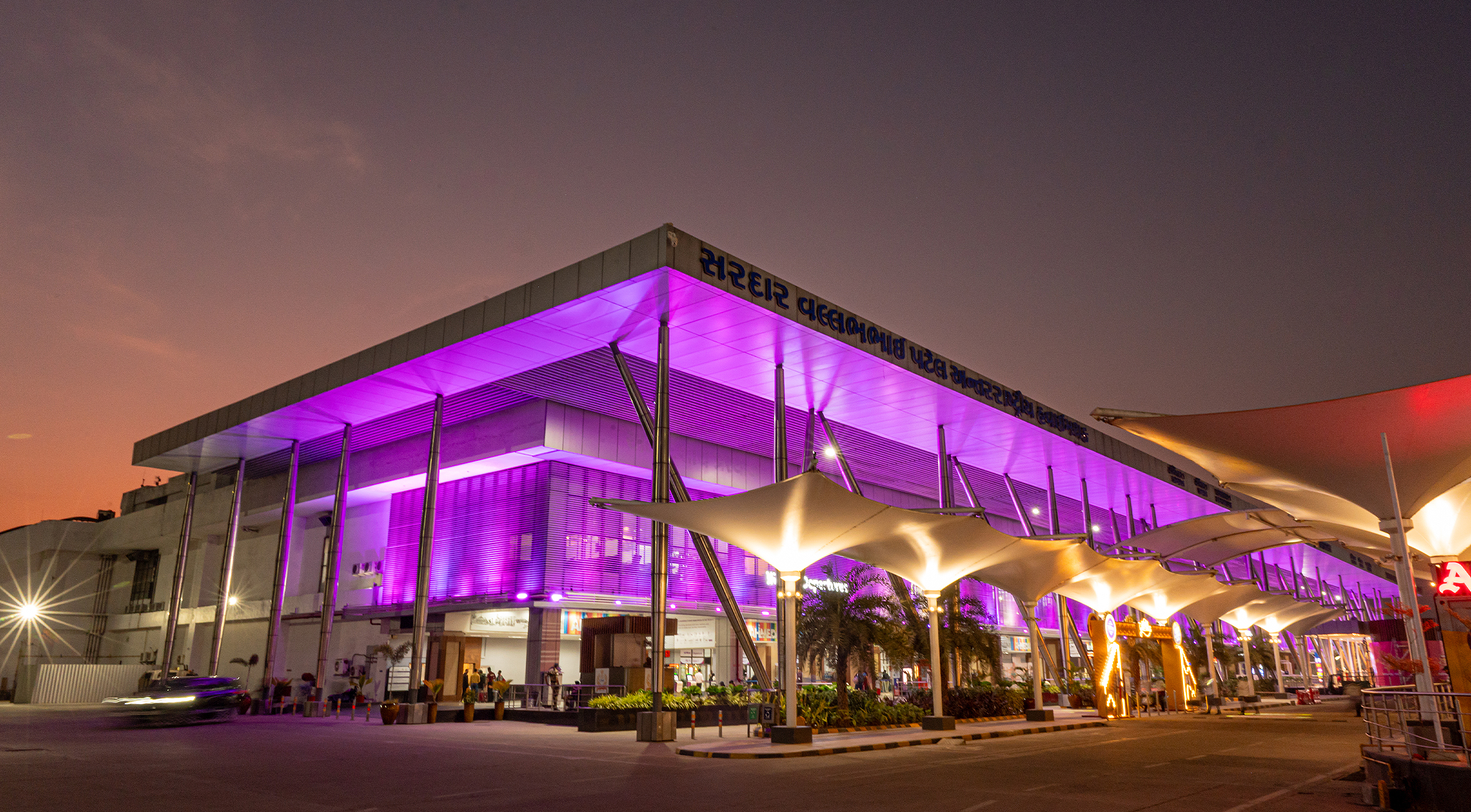
Sardar Vallabhbhai Patel International Airport (Ahmedabad)

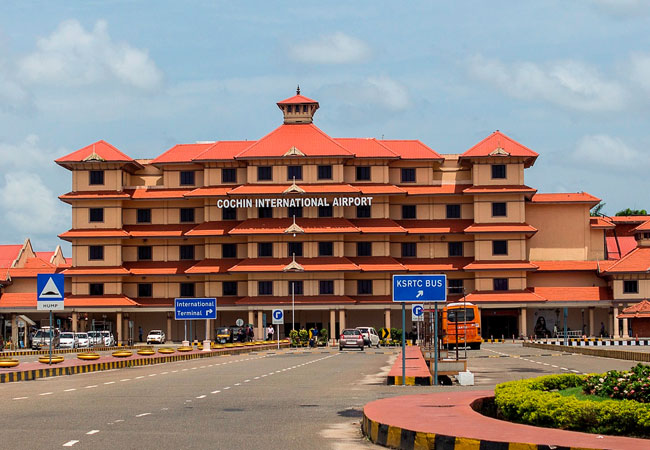
Cochin International Airport (Kochi)

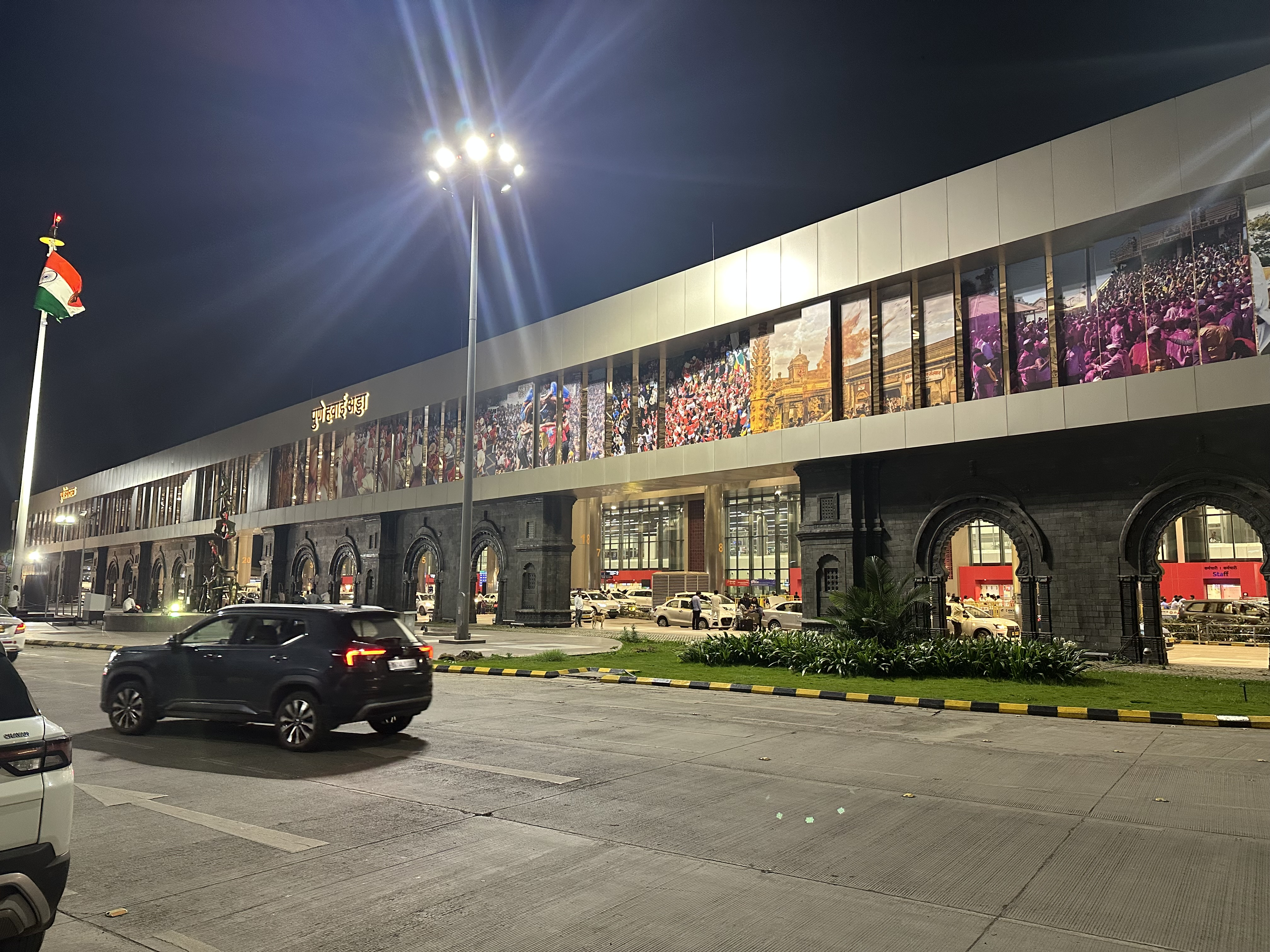
Pune Airport

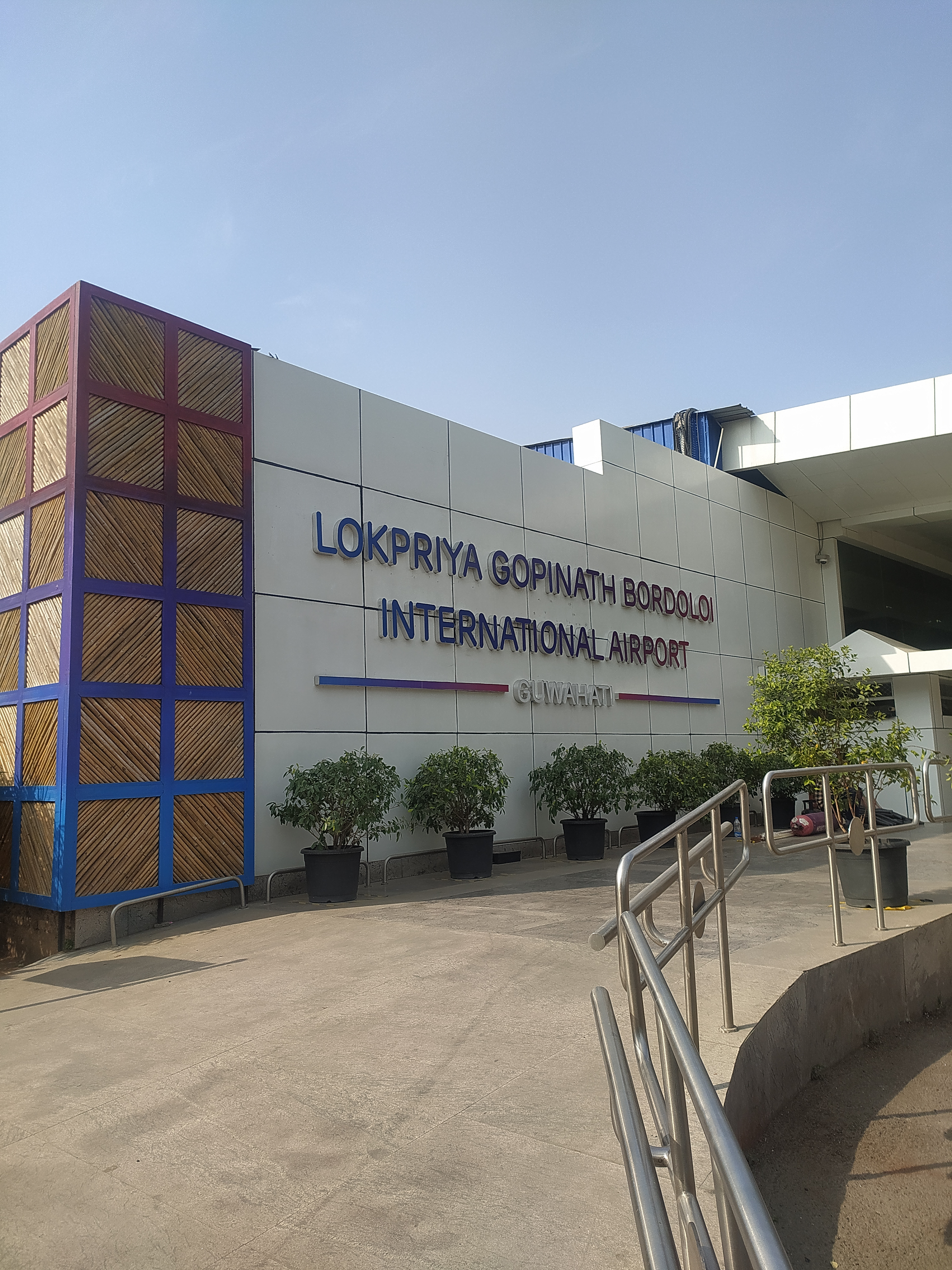
Lokpriya Gopinath Bordoloi International Airport (Guwahati)

== Passenger traffic ==
FY Annual Passengers (International + Domestic)
Year	Passengers
2011–12	162,305,422
2012–13	159,401,356
2013–14	168,916,042
2014–15	190,129,158
2015–16	223,615,522
2015-16	223,955,200
2016–17	264,969,723
2017–18	308,753,400
2018–19	344,699,733
2019–20	341,050,651
2020–21	115,379,783
2021–22	188,891,441
2022–23	327,279,136
2023–24	376,426,164
2024–25	412,086,111
2025–26	420,087,802

=== 2025-26 ===
Passenger traffic for FY 2025–26
Rank	Name	City	State/UT	IATA Code	Passengers 2025–26	Passengers 2024–25	% Change	Rank Change
1	Indira Gandhi International Airport	Delhi	Delhi NCR	DEL	78,701,971	79,259,890	0.7	0
2	Chhatrapati Shivaji Maharaj International Airport	Mumbai	Maharashtra	BOM	55,290,095	55,122,422	0.3	0
3	Chennai International Airport	Chennai	Tamil Nadu	MAA	45,017,324	22,411,290	2.7	0
4	Kempegowda International Airport	Bengaluru	Karnataka	BLR	44,470,035	41,875,620	6.2	0
5	Rajiv Gandhi International Airport	Hyderabad	Telangana	HYD	30,483,885	29,482,396	3.4	0
6	Netaji Subhas Chandra Bose International Airport	Kolkata	West Bengal	CCU	21,102,741	21,831,118	3.3	0
7	Ahmedabad Airport	Ahmedabad	Gujarat	AMD	13,822,287	13,427,697	2.9	0
8	Cochin International Airport	Kochi	Kerala	COK	11,302,552	11,140,778	1.5	0
9	Pune Airport	Pune	Maharashtra	PNQ	11,005,988	10,457,694	5.2	0
10	Lokpriya Gopinath Bordoloi International Airport	Guwahati	Assam	GAU	6,622,784	6,160,157	7.5	2
11	Dabolim Airport	Dabolim	Goa	GOI	6,126,944	7,244,874	15.4	1
12	Chaudhary Charan Singh International Airport	Lucknow	Uttar Pradesh	LKO	6,065,957	6,438,506	5.8	1
13	Jaipur International Airport	Jaipur	Rajasthan	JAI	5,627,147	6,057,249	7.1	0
14	Manohar International Airport	Mopa	Goa	GOX	5,376,516	4,643,852	15.8	2
15	Biju Patnaik Airport	Bhubaneswar	Odisha	BBI	5,130,834	4,838,751	6.0	0
16	Thiruvananthapuram International Airport	Thiruvananthapuram	Kerala	TRV	4,694,206	4,891,009	4.0	2
17	Jay Prakash Narayan Airport	Patna	Bihar	PAT	4,386,376	3,819,477	14.8	3
18	Lal Bahadur Shastri Airport	Varanasi	Uttar Pradesh	VNS	4,343,347	4,027,810	7.8	1
19	Devi Ahilya Bai Holkar Airport	Indore	Madhya Pradesh	IDR	4,244,999	3,759,411	12.9	2
20	Chandigarh Airport	Chandigarh	Chandigarh	IXC	3,926,519	4,149,840	5.4	2
21	Kozhikode International Airport	Kozhikode	Kerala	CCJ	3,855,618	3,695,944	4.3	1
22	Bagdogra Airport	Siliguri	West Bengal	IXB	3,657,078	3,219,410	13.6	3
23	Coimbatore International Airport	Coimbatore	Tamil Nadu	CJB	3,420,745	3,253,190	5.2	1
24	Srinagar Airport	Srinagar	Jammu and Kashmir	SXR	3,372,163	4,472,449	24.6	7
25	Dr. Babasaheb Ambedkar International Airport	Nagpur	Maharashtra	NAG	3,007,734	2,894,099	3.9	2
26	Visakhapatnam Airport	Visakhapatnam	Andhra Pradesh	VTZ	2,967,744	2,955,089	0.4	0
27	Sri Guru Ram Das Ji International Airport	Amritsar	Punjab	ATQ	2,941,017	3,542,880	17.0	4
28	Swami Vivekananda Airport	Raipur	Chhattisgarh	RPR	2,763,498	2,572,031	7.4	0
29	Birsa Munda Airport	Ranchi	Jharkhand	IXR	2,701,796	2,569,371	5.2	0
30	Mangalore International Airport	Mangalore	Karnataka	IXE	2,548,088	2,343,032	8.8	0
31	Tiruchirappalli International Airport	Tiruchirappalli	Tamil Nadu	TRZ	2,221,024	1,956,851	13.5	0
32	Dehradun Airport	Dehradun	Uttarakhand	DED	1,871,115	1,724,978	8.5	0
33	Maharana Pratap Airport	Udaipur	Rajasthan	UDR	1,819,531	1,650,607	10.2	2
34	Veer Savarkar International Airport	Port Blair	Andaman and Nicobar	IXZ	1,816,485	1,656,704	9.6	0
35	Surat Airport	Surat	Gujarat	STV	1,814,572	1,724,821	5.2	2
36	Raja Bhoj Airport	Bhopal	Madhya Pradesh	BHO	1,581,305	1,603,251	1.4	1
37	Maharaja Bir Bikram Airport	Agartala	Tripura	IXA	1,538,175	1,410,793	9.0	1
38	Kannur International Airport	Kannur	Kerala	CNN	1,434,168	1,344,021	6.7	4
39	Vijayawada Airport	Vijayawada	Andhra Pradesh	VGA	1,411,958	1,388,943	1.7	2
40	Madurai International Airport	Madurai	Tamil Nadu	IXM	1,388,062	1,399,046	0.8	0
41	Jammu Airport	Jammu	Jammu and Kashmir	IXJ	1,383,717	1,614,167	14.3	5
42	Bir Tikendrajit International Airport	Imphal	Manipur	IMF	1,366,765	1,406,227	2.8	3
43	Vadodara Airport	Vadodara	Gujarat	BDQ	1,298,410	1,264,148	2.7	0
44	Rajkot International Airport	Rajkot	Gujarat	HSR	1,246,996	1,088,570	14.6	2
45	Tirupati Airport	Tirupati	Andhra Pradesh	TIR	1,196,176	995,640	20.1	4
46	Hindon Airport	Ghaziabad	Uttar Pradesh	HDO	1,131,127	83,964	1247	44
47	Gorakhpur Airport	Gorakhpur	Uttar Pradesh	GOP	1,122,776	867,994	29.4	3
48	Jodhpur Airport	Jodhpur	Rajasthan	JDH	1,090,554	1,041,817	4.7	0
49	Kushok Bakula Rimpochee Airport	Leh	Ladakh	IXL	1,070,313	1,194,892	10.4	5
50	Ayodhya Airport	Ayodhya	Uttar Pradesh	AYJ	923,651	1,115,016	17.2	5

Source: Airports Authority of India

=== 2024-25 ===
Passenger traffic for FY 2024–25
Rank	Name	City	State/UT	IATA Code	Passengers 2024–25	Passengers 2023–24	% Change	Rank Change
1	Indira Gandhi International Airport	Delhi	Delhi NCR	DEL	79,259,890	73,673,708	7.6	0
2	Chhatrapati Shivaji Maharaj International Airport	Mumbai	Maharashtra	BOM	55,122,422	52,820,754	4.4	0
3	Kempegowda International Airport	Bengaluru	Karnataka	BLR	41,875,620	37,528,533	11.6	0
4	Rajiv Gandhi International Airport	Hyderabad	Telangana	HYD	29,165,232	25,042,282	16.5	0
5	Chennai International Airport	Chennai	Tamil Nadu	MAA	22,411,290	21,207,262	5.7	0
6	Netaji Subhas Chandra Bose International Airport	Kolkata	West Bengal	CCU	21,831,118	19,784,417	10.3	0
7	Ahmedabad Airport	Ahmedabad	Gujarat	AMD	13,427,697	11,696,227	14.8	0
8	Cochin International Airport	Kochi	Kerala	COK	11,140,778	10,365,655	7.5	0
9	Pune Airport	Pune	Maharashtra	PNQ	10,457,694	9,525,484	9.8	0
10	Dabolim Airport	Dabolim	Goa	GOI	7,260,779	6,872,411	5.7	0
11	Chaudhary Charan Singh International Airport	Lucknow	Uttar Pradesh	LKO	6,438,506	6,184,850	4.1	0
12	Lokpriya Gopinath Bordoloi International Airport	Guwahati	Assam	GAU	6,160,157	5,957,609	3.4	0
13	Jaipur International Airport	Jaipur	Rajasthan	JAI	6,057,249	5,466,552	10.8	0
14	Thiruvananthapuram International Airport	Thiruvananthapuram	Kerala	TRV	4,891,009	4,405,318	11.0	2
15	Biju Patnaik Airport	Bhubaneswar	Odisha	BBI	4,838,751	4,600,615	5.2	1
16	Manohar International Airport	Mopa	Goa	GOX	4,643,852	4,406,087	5.4	1
17	Srinagar Airport	Srinagar	Jammu and Kashmir	SXR	4,472,449	4,205,541	6.3	0
18	Chandigarh Airport	Chandigarh	Chandigarh	IXC	4,149,840	3,721,229	11.5	0
19	Lal Bahadur Shastri Airport	Varanasi	Uttar Pradesh	VNS	4,027,810	2,996,698	34.4	5
20	Jay Prakash Narayan Airport	Patna	Bihar	PAT	3,819,477	3,751,450	11.0	0
21	Devi Ahilya Bai Holkar Airport	Indore	Madhya Pradesh	IDR	3,759,411	3,464,831	8.5	2
22	Kozhikode International Airport	Kozhikode	Kerala	CCJ	3,695,944	3,320,250	11.3	1
23	Sri Guru Ram Das Ji International Airport	Amritsar	Punjab	ATQ	3,542,880	3,085,598	14.8	0
24	Coimbatore International Airport	Coimbatore	Tamil Nadu	CJB	3,253,190	2,904,611	12.0	1
25	Bagdogra Airport	Siliguri	West Bengal	IXB	3,219,410	3,118,368	3.2	3
26	Visakhapatnam Airport	Visakhapatnam	Andhra Pradesh	VTZ	2,955,089	2,788,665	6.0	1
27	Dr. Babasaheb Ambedkar International Airport	Nagpur	Maharashtra	NAG	2,894,099	2,794,427	3.6	1
28	Swami Vivekananda Airport	Raipur	Chhattisgarh	RPR	2,572,031	2,432,118	5.8	1
29	Birsa Munda Airport	Ranchi	Jharkhand	IXR	2,569,371	2,577,406	0.3	1
30	Mangalore International Airport	Mangalore	Karnataka	IXE	2,343,032	2,030,387	15.4	0
31	Tiruchirappalli International Airport	Tiruchirappalli	Tamil Nadu	TRZ	1,956,851	1,763,942	10.9	0
32	Dehradun Airport	Dehradun	Uttarakhand	DED	1,724,978	1,598,297	7.9	0
33	Surat Airport	Surat	Gujarat	STV	1,724,821	1,380,752	24.9	4
34	Veer Savarkar International Airport	Port Blair	Andaman and Nicobar	IXZ	1,656,704	1,453,811	14.0	2
35	Maharana Pratap Airport	Udaipur	Rajasthan	UDR	1,650,607	1,503,535	9.8	2
36	Jammu Airport	Jammu	Jammu and Kashmir	IXJ	1,614,167	1,456,567	10.8	1
37	Raja Bhoj Airport	Bhopal	Madhya Pradesh	BHO	1,603,251	1,380,571	16.1	1
38	Maharaja Bir Bikram Airport	Agartala	Tripura	IXA	1,410,793	1,470,670	4.1	4
39	Bir Tikendrajit International Airport	Imphal	Manipur	IMF	1,406,227	1,274,666	10.3	1
40	Madurai International Airport	Madurai	Tamil Nadu	IXM	1,399,046	1,285,976	8.8	1
41	Vijayawada Airport	Vijayawada	Andhra Pradesh	VGA	1,388,943	1,062,506	30.7	4
42	Kannur International Airport	Kannur	Kerala	CNN	1,344,021	1,177,891	14.1	0
43	Vadodara Airport	Vadodara	Gujarat	BDQ	1,264,148	1,218,637	3.7	2
44	Kushok Bakula Rimpochee Airport	Leh	Ladakh	IXL	1,194,892	1,074,426	11.2	0
45	Ayodhya Airport	Ayodhya	Uttar Pradesh	AYJ	1,115,016	213,015	423.4	22
46	Rajkot International Airport	Rajkot	Gujarat	HSR	1,088,570	525,668	107.1	7
47	Prayagraj Airport	Prayagraj	Uttar Pradesh	IXD	1,077,393	610,707	76.4	4
48	Jodhpur Airport	Jodhpur	Rajasthan	JDH	1,041,817	1,091,127	4.5	5
49	Tirupati Airport	Tirupati	Andhra Pradesh	TIR	995,640	870,662	14.4	3
50	Gorakhpur Airport	Gorakhpur	Uttar Pradesh	GOP	867,994	680,203	27.6	1

Source: Airports Authority of India

=== 2023-24 ===
Passenger traffic for FY 2023–24
Rank	Name	City	State/UT	IATA Code	Passengers 2023–24	Passengers 2022–23	% Change	Rank Change
1	Indira Gandhi International Airport	Delhi	Delhi NCR	DEL	73,673,708	65,327,833	12.8	0
2	Chhatrapati Shivaji Maharaj International Airport	Mumbai	Maharashtra	BOM	52,820,754	43,930,298	20.2	0
3	Kempegowda International Airport	Bengaluru	Karnataka	BLR	37,528,533	31,911,429	17.6	0
4	Rajiv Gandhi International Airport	Hyderabad	Telangana	HYD	25,042,282	20,996,027	19.3	0
5	Chennai International Airport	Chennai	Tamil Nadu	MAA	21,207,262	18,571,393	14.2	0
6	Netaji Subhas Chandra Bose International Airport	Kolkata	West Bengal	CCU	19,784,417	17,768,862	11.3	0
7	Sardar Vallabhbhai Patel International Airport	Ahmedabad	Gujarat	AMD	11,696,227	10,137,001	15.4	0
8	Cochin International Airport	Kochi	Kerala	COK	10,365,655	8,812,531	17.6	0
9	Pune Airport	Pune	Maharashtra	PNQ	9,525,484	8,007,160	19.0	1
10	Dabolim Airport	Dabolim	Goa	GOI	6,872,411	8,359,393	17.8	1
11	Chaudhary Charan Singh International Airport	Lucknow	Uttar Pradesh	LKO	6,184,850	5,220,528	18.5	0
12	Lokpriya Gopinath Bordoloi International Airport	Guwahati	Assam	GAU	5,957,609	5,051,480	17.9	0
13	Jaipur International Airport	Jaipur	Rajasthan	JAI	5,466,552	4,764,382	14.7	0
14	Biju Patnaik International Airport	Bhubaneswar	Odisha	BBI	4,600,615	3,624,905	26.9	3
15	Manohar International Airport	Mopa	Goa	GOX	4,406,087	664,160	563.4	35
16	Trivandrum International Airport	Thiruvananthapuram	Kerala	TRV	4,405,318	3,478,067	26.7	2
17	Sheikh Ul Alam International Airport	Srinagar	Jammu and Kashmir	SXR	4,205,541	4,409,665	4.6	3
18	Chandigarh Airport	Chandigarh	Chandigarh	IXC	3,721,229	3,677,786	1.2	2
19	Devi Ahilyabai Holkar International Airport	Indore	Madhya Pradesh	IDR	3,464,831	2,828,587	22.5	1
20	Jay Prakash Narayan Airport	Patna	Bihar	PAT	3,440,450	3,748,635	8.2	5
21	Calicut International Airport	Kozhikode	Kerala	CCJ	3,320,250	2,982,879	11.3	2
22	Bagdogra International Airport	Siliguri	West Bengal	IXB	3,118,368	2,555,305	22.0	1
23	Sri Guru Ram Dass Jee International Airport	Amritsar	Punjab	ATQ	3,085,598	2,516,518	22.6	2
24	Lal Bahadur Shastri International Airport	Varanasi	Uttar Pradesh	VNS	2,996,698	2,521,442	18.8	0
25	Coimbatore International Airport	Coimbatore	Tamil Nadu	CJB	2,904,611	2,557,263	13.6	3
26	Dr. Babasaheb Ambedkar International Airport	Nagpur	Maharashtra	NAG	2,794,427	2,565,155	8.9	5
27	Visakhapatnam International Airport	Visakhapatnam	Andhra Pradesh	VTZ	2,788,665	2,500,654	11.5	1
28	Birsa Munda Airport	Ranchi	Jharkhand	IXR	2,577,406	2,417,774	6.6	1
29	Swami Vivekananda Airport	Raipur	Chhattisgarh	RPR	2,432,118	2,251,998	8.0	1
30	Mangalore International Airport	Mangalore	Karnataka	IXE	2,030,387	1,809,266	12.2	1
31	Tiruchirappalli International Airport	Tiruchirappalli	Tamil Nadu	TRZ	1,763,942	1,514,260	16.5	1
32	Jolly Grant Airport	Dehradun	Uttarakhand	DED	1,598,297	1,595,977	0.1	2
33	Maharana Pratap Airport	Udaipur	Rajasthan	UDR	1,503,535	1,355,215	10.9	1
34	Maharaja Bir Bikram Airport	Agartala	Tripura	IXA	1,470,670	1,386,087	6.1	1
35	Jammu Airport	Jammu	Jammu and Kashmir	IXJ	1,456,567	1,579,519	7.8	4
36	Veer Savarkar Airport	Port Blair	Andaman and Nicobar	IXZ	1,453,811	1,273,138	14.2	1
37	Surat International Airport	Surat	Gujarat	STV	1,380,752	1,239,913	11.4	1
38	Bhopal Airport	Bhopal	Madhya Pradesh	BHO	1,380,571	1,135,781	21.6	3
39	Madurai International Airport	Madurai	Tamil Nadu	IXM	1,285,976	1,138,005	13.0	1
40	Imphal Airport	Imphal	Manipur	IMF	1,274,666	1,233,997	13.3	1
41	Vadodara Airport	Vadodara	Gujarat	BDQ	1,218,637	1,088,990	11.9	1
42	Kannur International Airport	Kannur	Kerala	CNN	1,177,891	1,257,086	6.3	5
43	Jodhpur Airport	Jodhpur	Rajasthan	JDH	1,091,127	899,403	21.3	2
44	Leh Kushok Bakula Rimpochee Airport	Leh	Ladakh	IXL	1,074,426	1,260,725	14.8	8
45	Vijayawada International Airport	Vijayawada	Andhra Pradesh	VGA	1,062,506	966,383	9.9	2
46	Tirupati Airport	Tirupati	Andhra Pradesh	TIR	870,662	919,267	5.3	2
47	Dibrugarh Airport	Dibrugarh	Assam	DIB	745,876	675,304	10.5	2
48	Shirdi Airport	Shirdi	Maharashtra	SAG	724,980	733,038	1.1	1
49	Gorakhpur Airport	Gorakhpur	Uttar Pradesh	GOP	680,203	717,819	5.2	1
50	Sambhajinagar Airport	Sambhajinagar	Maharashtra	IXU	623,915	468,486	33.2	4

Source: Airports Authority of India

=== 2022-23 ===
Passenger traffic for FY 2022–23
Rank	Name	City	State/UT	IATA Code	Passengers 2022–23	Passengers 2021–22	% Change	Rank Change
1	Indira Gandhi International Airport	Delhi NCR	Delhi	DEL	65,327,833	39,339,998	66.1	0
2	Chhatrapati Shivaji Maharaj International Airport	Mumbai	Maharashtra	BOM	43,930,298	21,747,892	102.0	0
3	Kempegowda International Airport	Bengaluru	Karnataka	BLR	31,911,429	16,287,097	95.9	0
4	Rajiv Gandhi International Airport	Hyderabad	Telangana	HYD	20,996,027	12,429,796	68.9	0
5	Chennai International Airport	Chennai	Tamil Nadu	MAA	18,571,393	9,533,301	94.8	1
6	Netaji Subhas Chandra Bose International Airport	Kolkata	West Bengal	CCU	17,768,862	11,036,108	61.0	1
7	Sardar Vallabhbhai Patel International Airport	Ahmedabad	Gujarat	AMD	10,137,001	5,670,896	78.8	0
8	Cochin International Airport	Kochi	Kerala	COK	8,812,531	4,717,777	86.8	1
9	Dabolim Airport	Dabolim	Goa	GOI	8,359,393	5,238,051	59.6	1
10	Pune Airport	Pune	Maharashtra	PNQ	8,007,160	3,713,491	115.6	0
11	Chaudhary Charan Singh International Airport	Lucknow	Uttar Pradesh	LKO	5,220,528	3,303,960	58.0	0
12	Lokpriya Gopinath Bordoloi International Airport	Guwahati	Assam	GAU	5,051,480	3,148,956	60.4	1
13	Jaipur International Airport	Jaipur	Rajasthan	JAI	4,764,382	2,943,171	61.9	2
14	Srinagar International Airport	Srinagar	Jammu and Kashmir	SXR	4,409,665	3,158,400	39.6	2
15	Jay Prakash Narayan Airport	Patna	Bihar	PAT	3,748,635	2,967,681	26.3	1
16	Chandigarh Airport	Chandigarh	Chandigarh	IXC	3,677,786	2,289,169	60.7	0
17	Biju Patnaik International Airport	Bhubaneswar	Odisha	BBI	3,624,905	2,135,893	69.7	0
18	Trivandrum International Airport	Thiruvananthapuram	Kerala	TRV	3,478,067	1,655,506	110.1	4
19	Calicut International Airport	Kozhikode	Kerala	CCJ	2,982,879	1,665,145	79.1	2
20	Devi Ahilyabai Holkar International Airport	Indore	Madhya Pradesh	IDR	2,828,587	1,629,668	73.6	3
21	Dr. Babasaheb Ambedkar International Airport	Nagpur	Maharashtra	NAG	2,565,155	1,605,433	59.8	4
22	Coimbatore International Airport	Coimbatore	Tamil Nadu	CJB	2,557,263	1,285,922	98.9	6
23	Bagdogra International Airport	Siliguri	West Bengal	IXB	2,555,305	1,980,049	29.1	5
24	Lal Bahadur Shastri International Airport	Varanasi	Uttar Pradesh	VNS	2,521,442	1,708,220	47.6	4
25	Sri Guru Ram Dass Jee International Airport	Amritsar	Punjab	ATQ	2,516,518	1,382,004	82.1	2
26	Visakhapatnam International Airport	Visakhapatnam	Andhra Pradesh	VTZ	2,500,654	1,610,483	55.3	2
27	Birsa Munda Airport	Ranchi	Jharkhand	IXR	2,417,774	1,723,237	40.3	8
28	Swami Vivekananda Airport	Raipur	Chhattisgarh	RPR	2,251,998	1,407,157	60.0	2
29	Mangalore International Airport	Mangalore	Karnataka	IXE	1,809,266	1,013,453	78.5	2
30	Jolly Grant Airport	Dehradun	Uttarakhand	DED	1,595,977	917,949	73.9	3
31	Jammu Airport	Jammu	Jammu and Kashmir	IXJ	1,579,519	1,273,288	24.1	2
32	Tiruchirappalli International Airport	Tiruchirappalli	Tamil Nadu	TRZ	1,514,260	556,707	172.0	15
33	Maharaja Bir Bikram Airport	Agartala	Tripura	IXA	1,386,087	901,206	53.8	2
34	Maharana Pratap Airport	Udaipur	Rajasthan	UDR	1,355,215	917,938	47.6	0
35	Veer Savarkar Airport	Port Blair	Andaman and Nicobar	IXZ	1,273,138	761,610	67.2	4
36	Leh Kushok Bakula Rimpochee Airport	Leh	Ladakh	IXL	1,260,725	1,050,714	20.0	6
37	Kannur International Airport	Kannur	Kerala	CNN	1,257,086	799,122	57.3	0
38	Surat International Airport	Surat	Gujarat	STV	1,239,913	933,817	32.8	6
39	Imphal Airport	Imphal	Manipur	IMF	1,233,997	814,913	51.4	3
40	Madurai International Airport	Madurai	Tamil Nadu	IXM	1,138,005	679,781	67.4	1
41	Bhopal Airport	Bhopal	Madhya Pradesh	BHO	1,135,781	733,236	54.9	1
42	Vadodara Airport	Vadodara	Gujarat	BDQ	1,088,990	575,690	89.2	4
43	Vijayawada International Airport	Vijayawada	Andhra Pradesh	VGA	966,383	625,131	54.6	1
44	Tirupati Airport	Tirupati	Andhra Pradesh	TIR	919,267	623,341	47.5	1
45	Jodhpur Airport	Jodhpur	Rajasthan	JDH	899,403	768,227	17.1	7
46	Rajkot Airport	Rajkot	Gujarat	RAJ	770,605	420,372	83.3	4
47	Shirdi Airport	Shirdi	Maharashtra	SAG	733,038	176,787	314.6	10
48	Gorakhpur Airport	Gorakhpur	Uttar Pradesh	GOP	717,819	602,820	19.1	3
49	Dibrugarh Airport	Dibrugarh	Assam	DIB	675,304	525,925	28.4	2
50	Manohar International Airport	Mopa	Goa	GOX	664,160	New	NA	NA

Source: Airports Authority of India

=== 2021-22 ===
Passenger traffic for FY 2021–22
Rank	Name	City	State/UT	IATA Code	Passengers 2021–22	Passengers 2020–21	% Change	Rank Change
1	Indira Gandhi International Airport	Delhi NCR	Delhi	DEL	39,339,998	22,583,736	74.2	0
2	Chhatrapati Shivaji Maharaj International Airport	Mumbai	Maharashtra	BOM	21,747,892	11,054,811	96.7	0
3	Kempegowda International Airport	Bengaluru	Karnataka	BLR	16,287,097	10,914,194	49.2	0
4	Rajiv Gandhi International Airport	Hyderabad	Telangana	HYD	12,429,796	8,048,248	54.4	0
5	Netaji Subhas Chandra Bose International Airport	Kolkata	West Bengal	CCU	11,036,108	7,728,906	42.8	0
6	Chennai International Airport	Chennai	Tamil Nadu	MAA	9,533,301	5,495,707	73.5	0
7	Sardar Vallabhbhai Patel International Airport	Ahmedabad	Gujarat	AMD	5,670,896	3,642,413	55.7	0
8	Dabolim Airport	Dabolim	Goa	GOI	5,238,051	2,890,545	81.2	0
9	Cochin International Airport	Kochi	Kerala	COK	4,717,777	2,458,458	91.9	1
10	Pune Airport	Pune	Maharashtra	PNQ	3,713,491	2,137,859	73.7	3
11	Chaudhary Charan Singh International Airport	Lucknow	Uttar Pradesh	LKO	3,303,960	2,441,037	35.4	0
12	Sheikh ul-Alam International Airport	Srinagar	Jammu and Kashmir	SXR	3,158,400	1,802,904	75.2	3
13	Lokpriya Gopinath Bordoloi International Airport	Guwahati	Assam	GAU	3,148,956	2,189,135	43.8	1
14	Jay Prakash Narayan Airport	Patna	Bihar	PAT	2,967,681	2,710,000	9.5	5
15	Jaipur International Airport	Jaipur	Rajasthan	JAI	2,943,171	1,850,187	59.1	1
16	Chandigarh Airport	Chandigarh	Chandigarh	IXC	2,289,169	1,381,634	65.7	3
17	Biju Patnaik International Airport	Bhubaneswar	Odisha	BBI	2,135,893	1,571,933	35.9	1
18	Bagdogra International Airport	Siliguri	West Bengal	IXB	1,980,049	1,473,310	34.4	1
19	Birsa Munda Airport	Ranchi	Jharkhand	IXR	1,723,237	1,219,643	41.3	1
20	Lal Bahadur Shastri International Airport	Varanasi	Uttar Pradesh	VNS	1,708,220	1,466,718	16.5	2
21	Calicut International Airport	Kozhikode	Kerala	CCJ	1,665,145	902,012	84.6	4
22	Trivandrum International Airport	Thiruvananthapuram	Kerala	TRV	1,655,506	935,435	77.0	2
23	Devi Ahilyabai Holkar International Airport	Indore	Madhya Pradesh	IDR	1,629,668	896,304	81.8	3
24	Visakhapatnam International Airport	Visakhapatnam	Andhra Pradesh	VTZ	1,610,483	1,113,513	44.6	3
25	Dr. Babasaheb Ambedkar International Airport	Nagpur	Maharashtra	NAG	1,605,433	948,237	69.3	2
26	Swami Vivekananda Airport	Raipur	Chhattisgarh	RPR	1,407,157	1,041,070	35.2	4
27	Sri Guru Ram Dass Jee International Airport	Amritsar	Punjab	ATQ	1,382,004	854,352	61.8	0
28	Coimbatore International Airport	Coimbatore	Tamil Nadu	CJB	1,285,922	846,649	51.9	1
29	Jammu Airport	Jammu	Jammu and Kashmir	IXJ	1,273,288	850,909	49.6	1
30	Leh Kushok Bakula Rimpochee Airport	Leh	Ladakh	IXL	1,050,714	321,462	226.9	16
31	Mangalore International Airport	Mangalore	Karnataka	IXE	1,013,453	614,845	64.8	0
32	Surat International Airport	Surat	Gujarat	STV	933,817	564,260	65.5	2
33	Jolly Grant Airport	Dehradun	Uttarakhand	DED	917,949	647,209	41.8	3
34	Udaipur Airport	Udaipur	Rajasthan	UDR	917,938	404,787	126.8	6
35	Maharaja Bir Bikram Airport	Agartala	Tripura	IXA	901,206	577,085	56.2	3
36	Imphal Airport	Imphal	Manipur	IMF	814,913	492,752	65.4	1
37	Kannur International Airport	Kannur	Kerala	CNN	799,122	481,084	66.1	1
38	Jodhpur Airport	Jodhpur	Rajasthan	JDH	768,227	281,856	172.6	9
39	Veer Savarkar Airport	Port Blair	Andaman and Nicobar	IXZ	761,610	400,361	90.2	2
40	Bhopal Airport	Bhopal	Madhya Pradesh	BHO	733,236	462,932	58.4	1
41	Madurai International Airport	Madurai	Tamil Nadu	IXM	679,781	565,539	20.2	8
42	Vijayawada International Airport	Vijayawada	Andhra Pradesh	VGA	625,131	507,215	23.2	7
43	Tirupati Airport	Tirupati	Andhra Pradesh	TIR	623,341	352,375	76.9	1
44	Darbhanga Airport	Darbhanga	Bihar	DBR	619,948	153,281	304.5	8
45	Gorakhpur Airport	Gorakhpur	Uttar Pradesh	GOP	602,820	500,744	20.4	9
46	Vadodara Airport	Vadodara	Gujarat	BDQ	575,690	267,800	115.0	2
47	Tiruchirappalli International Airport	Tiruchirappalli	Tamil Nadu	TRZ	556,707	355,903	56.4	4
48	Dibrugarh Airport	Dibrugarh	Assam	DIB	525,925	386,694	36.0	6
49	Allahabad Airport	Allahabad	Uttar Pradesh	IXD	441,006	346,861	27.1	4
50	Rajkot Airport	Rajkot	Gujarat	RAJ	420,372	143,740	192.5	3

Source: Airports Authority of India

=== 2020-21 ===
Passenger traffic for FY 2020–21
Rank	Name	City	State/UT	IATA code	Passengers 2020–21	Passengers 2019–20	% Change	Rank change
1	Indira Gandhi International Airport	New Delhi	Delhi	DEL	22,583,736	67,301,016	66.4	0
2	Chhatrapati Shivaji Maharaj International Airport	Mumbai	Maharashtra	BOM	11,054,811	45,873,329	75.9	0
3	Kempegowda International Airport	Bengaluru	Karnataka	BLR	10,914,194	32,361,666	66.3	0
4	Rajiv Gandhi International Airport	Hyderabad	Telangana	HYD	8,048,248	21,651,878	62.8	2
5	Netaji Subhas Chandra Bose International Airport	Kolkata	West Bengal	CCU	7,728,906	22,015,391	64.9	0
6	Chennai International Airport	Chennai	Tamil Nadu	MAA	5,495,707	22,266,722	75.3	2
7	Sardar Vallabhbhai Patel International Airport	Ahmedabad	Gujarat	AMD	3,642,413	11,432,996	68.1	0
8	Dabolim Airport	Dabolim	Goa	GOI	2,890,545	8,356,240	65.4	1
9	Jay Prakash Narayan Airport	Patna	Bihar	PAT	2,710,000	4,525,765	40.1	5
10	Cochin International Airport	Kochi	Kerala	COK	2,458,458	9,624,334	74.5	2
11	Chaudhary Charan Singh International Airport	Lucknow	Uttar Pradesh	LKO	2,441,037	5,433,757	55.1	1
12	Lokpriya Gopinath Bordoloi International Airport	Guwahati	Assam	GAU	2,189,135	5,457,449	59.9	1
13	Pune Airport	Pune	Maharashtra	PNQ	2,137,859	8,085,607	73.6	3
14	Jaipur International Airport	Jaipur	Rajasthan	JAI	1,850,187	5,031,561	63.2	1
15	Sheikh ul-Alam International Airport	Srinagar	Jammu and Kashmir	SXR	1,802,904	2,820,924	36.1	8
16	Biju Patnaik International Airport	Bhubaneswar	Odisha	BBI	1,571,933	3,672,246	57.2	0
17	Bagdogra International Airport	Siliguri	West Bengal	IXB	1,473,310	3,216,640	54.2	1
18	Lal Bahadur Shastri International Airport	Varanasi	Uttar Pradesh	VNS	1,466,718	3,010,702	51.3	2
19	Chandigarh International Airport	Chandigarh	Chandigarh	IXC	1,381,634	2,445,202	43.5	8
20	Birsa Munda Airport	Ranchi	Jharkhand	IXR	1,219,643	2,485,293	50.9	5
21	Visakhapatnam International Airport	Visakhapatnam	Andhra Pradesh	VTZ	1,113,514	2,681,283	58.5	3
22	Swami Vivekananda Airport	Raipur	Chhattisgarh	RPR	1,041,070	2,119,417	50.9	6
23	Dr. Babasaheb Ambedkar International Airport	Nagpur	Maharashtra	NAG	948,237	3,061,548	69.0	4
24	Trivandrum International Airport	Thiruvananthapuram	Kerala	TRV	935,435	3,919,193	76.1	9
25	Calicut International Airport	Kozhikode	Kerala	CCJ	902,012	3,229,910	72.1	8
26	Devi Ahilyabai Holkar International Airport	Indore	Madhya Pradesh	IDR	896,304	2,918,971	69.3	5
27	Sri Guru Ram Dass Jee International Airport	Amritsar	Punjab	ATQ	854,352	2,457,615	65.2	1
28	Jammu Airport	Jammu	Jammu and Kashmir	IXJ	850,909	1,455,433	41.5	7
29	Coimbatore International Airport	Coimbatore	Tamil Nadu	CJB	846,649	2,842,835	70.2	7
30	Jolly Grant Airport	Dehradun	Uttarakhand	DED	647,209	1,325,931	51.2	8
31	Mangalore International Airport	Mangalore	Karnataka	IXE	614,845	1,876,294	67.2	2
32	Agartala Airport	Agartala	Tripura	IXA	577,085	1,506,435	61.7	2
33	Madurai International Airport	Madurai	Tamil Nadu	IXM	565,539	1,422,337	60.2	3
34	Surat International Airport	Surat	Gujarat	STV	564,260	1,515,557	62.8	1
35	Vijayawada International Airport	Vijayawada	Andhra Pradesh	VGA	507,215	1,130,583	55.1	6
36	Gorakhpur Airport	Gorakhpur	Uttar Pradesh	GOP	500,744	665,703	24.8	9
37	Imphal Airport	Imphal	Manipur	IMF	492,752	1,285,860	61.7	2
38	Kannur International Airport	Kannur	Kerala	CNN	481,084	1,583,600	69.6	6
39	Raja Bhoj Airport	Bhopal	Madhya Pradesh	BHO	462,932	1,331,322	65.2	2
40	Maharana Pratap Airport	Udaipur	Rajasthan	UDR	404,787	1,249,617	67.6	0
41	Veer Savarkar International Airport	Port Blair	Andaman and Nicobar	IXZ	400,361	1,658,661	75.9	11
42	Dibrugarh Airport	Dibrugarh	Assam	DIB	386,694	531,993	27.3	6
43	Tiruchirappalli International Airport	Tiruchirappalli	Tamil Nadu	TRZ	355,903	1,612,492	77.9	12
44	Tirupati Airport	Tirupati	Andhra Pradesh	TIR	352,375	834,984	57.8	1
45	Allahabad Airport	Prayagraj	Uttar Pradesh	IXD	346,861	414,064	16.2	5
46	Leh Kushok Bakula Rimpochee Airport	Leh	Ladakh	IXL	321,462	763,042	57.9	2
47	Jodhpur Airport	Jodhpur	Rajasthan	JDH	281,856	568,716	50.4	0
48	Vadodara Airport	Vadodara	Gujarat	BDQ	267,800	1,104,061	75.7	6
49	Silchar Airport	Silchar	Assam	IXS	265,203	398,910	33.5	?
50	Belgaum Airport	Belgaum	Karnataka	IXG	258,038	276,308	6.6	?

Source: Airports Authority of India

=== 2019-20 ===
Passenger traffic for FY 2019–20
Rank	Name	City	State/UT	IATA code	Passengers 2019–20	Passengers 2018–19	% Change	Rank change
1	Indira Gandhi International Airport	Delhi	Delhi	DEL	67,301,016	69,233,864	2.8	0
2	Chhatrapati Shivaji Maharaj International Airport	Mumbai	Maharashtra	BOM	45,873,329	48,815,063	6.0	0
3	Kempegowda International Airport	Bengaluru	Karnataka	BLR	32,361,666	33,307,702	2.8	0
4	Chennai International Airport	Chennai	Tamil Nadu	MAA	22,266,722	22,543,822	1.2	0
5	Netaji Subhas Chandra Bose International Airport	Kolkata	West Bengal	CCU	22,015,391	21,877,350	0.6	0
6	Rajiv Gandhi International Airport	Hyderabad	Telangana	HYD	21,651,878	21,403,972	1.2	0
7	Sardar Vallabhbhai Patel International Airport	Ahmedabad	Gujarat	AMD	11,432,996	11,172,468	2.3	0
8	Cochin International Airport	Kochi	Kerala	COK	9,624,334	10,201,089	4.9	0
9	Dabolim Airport	Dabolim	Goa	GOI	8,356,240	8,467,326	1.3	1
10	Pune Airport	Pune	Maharashtra	PNQ	8,085,607	9,070,917	10.9	1
11	Lokpriya Gopinath Bordoloi International Airport	Guwahati	Assam	GAU	5,457,449	5,745,628	5.0	0
12	Chaudhary Charan Singh International Airport	Lucknow	Uttar Pradesh	LKO	5,433,757	5,532,819	1.8	0
13	Jaipur International Airport	Jaipur	Rajasthan	JAI	5,031,561	5,471,223	8.0	0
14	Jay Prakash Narayan Airport	Patna	Bihar	PAT	4,525,765	4,061,990	11.4	2
15	Trivandrum International Airport	Thiruvananthapuram	Kerala	TRV	3,919,193	4,434,459	11.6	1
16	Biju Patnaik International Airport	Bhubaneswar	Odisha	BBI	3,672,246	4,158,731	11.7	1
17	Calicut International Airport	Kozhikode	Kerala	CCJ	3,229,910	3,360,847	3.9	0
18	Bagdogra International Airport	Siliguri	West Bengal	IXB	3,216,640	2,898,784	11	2
19	Dr. Babasaheb Ambedkar International Airport	Nagpur	Maharashtra	NAG	3,061,548	2,801,910	9.3	3
20	Lal Bahadur Shastri Airport	Varanasi	Uttar Pradesh	VNS	3,010,702	2,785,015	8.1	3
21	Devi Ahilyabai Holkar International Airport	Indore	Madhya Pradesh	IDR	2,918,971	3,158,938	7.6	3
22	Coimbatore International Airport	Coimbatore	Tamil Nadu	CJB	2,842,835	3,000,882	5.3	3
23	Sheikh ul-Alam International Airport	Srinagar	Jammu and Kashmir	SXR	2,820,924	2,737,560	3.0	1
24	Visakhapatnam International Airport	Visakhapatnam	Andhra Pradesh	VTZ	2,681,283	2,853,390	6.0	3
25	Birsa Munda Airport	Ranchi	Jharkhand	IXR	2,485,293	2,254,108	10.3	1
26	Sri Guru Ram Dass Jee International Airport	Amritsar	Punjab	ATQ	2,457,615	2,523,794	2.6	1
27	Chandigarh International Airport	Chandigarh	Chandigarh	IXC	2,445,202	2,097,698	16.6	1
28	Swami Vivekananda Airport	Raipur	Chhattisgarh	RPR	2,119,417	2,028,548	4.5	1
29	Mangalore International Airport	Mangalore	Karnataka	IXE	1,876,294	2,240,664	16.3	2
30	Veer Savarkar International Airport	Port Blair	Andaman and Nicobar	IXZ	1,658,661	1,711,881	3.1	0
31	Tiruchirappalli International Airport	Tiruchirappalli	Tamil Nadu	TRZ	1,612,492	1,578,831	2.1	0
32	Kannur International Airport	Kannur	Kerala	CNN	1,583,600	224,302	606	?
33	Surat International Airport	Surat	Gujarat	STV	1,515,557	1,238,724	22.3	5
34	Agartala Airport	Agartala	Tripura	IXA	1,506,435	1,441,089	4.5	1
35	Jammu Airport	Jammu	Jammu and Kashmir	IXJ	1,455,433	1,334,313	9.1	0
36	Madurai International Airport	Madurai	Tamil Nadu	IXM	1,422,337	1,520,016	6.4	4
37	Raja Bhoj Airport	Bhopal	Madhya Pradesh	BHO	1,331,322	810,307	64.3	6
38	Jolly Grant Airport	Dehradun	Uttarakhand	DED	1,325,931	1,240,173	6.9	1
39	Imphal Airport	Imphal	Manipur	IMF	1,285,860	1,277,163	0.7	3
40	Maharana Pratap Airport	Udaipur	Rajasthan	UDR	1,249,617	1,392,210	10.2	6
41	Vijayawada International Airport	Vijayawada	Andhra Pradesh	VGA	1,130,583	1,192,000	4.6	2
42	Vadodara Airport	Vadodara	Gujarat	BDQ	1,104,061	1,155,716	4.5	2
43	Tirupati Airport	Tirupati	Andhra Pradesh	TIR	834,984	834,652	0	2
44	Leh Kushok Bakula Rimpochee Airport	Leh	Ladakh	IXL	763,042	821,689	7.1	2
45	Gorakhpur Airport	Gorakhpur	Uttar Pradesh	GOP	665,703	257,147	158.9	
46	Shirdi Airport	Shirdi	Maharashtra	SAG	568,968	229,040	148.4	
47	Jodhpur Airport	Jodhpur	Rajasthan	JDH	568,716	506,826	12.2	2
48	Dibrugarh Airport	Dibrugarh	Assam	DIB	531,993	367,929	44.6	1
49	Hubli Airport	Hubli	Karnataka	HBX	475,218	460,462	3.2	4
50	Allahabad Airport	Prayagraj	Uttar Pradesh	IXD	414,064	174,791	136.9	

Source : Airports Authority of India

=== 2018-19 ===
Passenger traffic for FY 2018–19
Rank	Name	City	State/UT	IATA code	Passengers 2018–19	Passengers 2017-18	% Change	Rank change
1	Indira Gandhi International Airport	Delhi	Delhi	DEL	69,233,864	65,691,662	5.4	0
2	Chhatrapati Shivaji Maharaj International Airport	Mumbai	Maharashtra	BOM	48,815,063	48,496,430	0.7	0
3	Kempegowda International Airport	Bengaluru	Karnataka	BLR	33,307,702	26,910,431	23.8	0
4	Chennai International Airport	Chennai	Tamil Nadu	MAA	22,543,822	20,361,482	10.7	0
5	Netaji Subhas Chandra Bose International Airport	Kolkata	West Bengal	CCU	21,877,350	19,433,254	10.0	0
6	Rajiv Gandhi International Airport	Hyderabad	Telangana	HYD	21,403,972	18,156,789	17.9	0
7	Sardar Vallabhbhai Patel International Airport	Ahmedabad	Gujarat	AMD	11,172,468	9,174,425	21.8	1
8	Cochin International Airport	Kochi	Kerala	COK	10,201,089	10,124,975	0.75	1
9	Pune Airport	Pune	Maharashtra	PNQ	9,070,917	8,164,840	11.1	0
10	Dabolim Airport	Dabolim	Goa	GOI	8,467,326	7,607,249	11.3	0
11	Lokpriya Gopinath Bordoloi International Airport	Guwahati	Assam	GAU	5,745,628	4,668,053	23.1	2
12	Chaudhary Charan Singh Airport	Lucknow	Uttar Pradesh	LKO	5,532,819	4,752,921	16.4	0
13	Jaipur International Airport	Jaipur	Rajasthan	JAI	5,471,223	4,757,178	15	2
14	Trivandrum International Airport	Thiruvananthapuram	Kerala	TRV	4,434,459	4,393,469	0.933	0
15	Biju Patnaik International Airport	Bhubaneswar	Odisha	BBI	4,158,731	3,250,635	27.9	0
16	Jaya Prakash Narayan Airport	Patna	Bihar	PAT	4,061,990	3,111,273	30.6	1
17	Calicut International Airport	Kozhikode	Kerala	CCJ	3,360,847	3,139,432	7.1	1
18	Devi Ahilyabai Holkar International Airport	Indore	Madhya Pradesh	IDR	3,158,938	2,269,971	39.2	4
19	Coimbatore International Airport	Coimbatore	Tamil Nadu	CJB	3,000,882	2,403,935	24.8	1
20	Bagdogra International Airport	Siliguri	West Bengal	IXB	2,898,784	2,255,768	28.5	4
21	Visakhapatnam International Airport	Visakhapatnam	Andhra Pradesh	VTZ	2,853,390	2,480,379	15	2
22	Dr. Babasaheb Ambedkar International Airport	Nagpur	Maharashtra	NAG	2,801,910	2,186,137	28.2	3
23	Lal Bahadur Shastri Airport	Varanasi	Uttar Pradesh	VNS	2,785,015	2,087,581	33.4	4
24	Sheikh ul-Alam International Airport	Srinagar	Jammu and Kashmir	SXR	2,737,560	2,440,467	12.2	4
25	Sri Guru Ram Dass Jee International Airport	Amritsar	Punjab	ATQ	2,523,794	2,319,955	8.8	4
26	Birsa Munda Airport	Ranchi	Jharkhand	IXR	2,254,108	1,778,349	26.8	2
27	Mangalore International Airport	Mangalore	Karnataka	IXE	2,240,664	2,269,949	1.3	4
28	Chandigarh International Airport	Chandigarh	Chandigarh	IXC	2,097,698	2,137,739	1.9	2
29	Swami Vivekananda Airport	Raipur	Chhattisgarh	RPR	2,028,548	1,628,134	24.6	0
30	Veer Savarkar International Airport	Port Blair	Andaman and Nicobar	IXZ	1,711,881	1,549,951	10.4	0
31	Tiruchirappalli International Airport	Tiruchirappalli	Tamil Nadu	TRZ	1,578,831	1,513,273	4.3	0
32	Madurai International Airport	Madurai	Tamil Nadu	IXM	1,520,016	1,442,807	5.4	1
33	Agartala Airport	Agartala	Tripura	IXA	1,441,089	1,379,090	4.5	1
34	Maharana Pratap Airport	Udaipur	Rajasthan	UDR	1,392,210	1,147,067	21.4	1
35	Jammu Airport	Jammu	Jammu and Kashmir	IXJ	1,334,313	1,443,965	7.6	3
36	Imphal Airport	Imphal	Manipur	IMF	1,277,163	987,506	29.3	2
37	Jolly Grant Airport	Dehradun	Uttarakhand	DED	1,240,173	1,124,937	10.2	1
38	Surat International Airport	Surat	Gujarat	STV	1,238,724	681,465	81.8	4
39	Vijayawada International Airport	Vijayawada	Andhra Pradesh	VGA	1,192,000	746,392	58.7	0
40	Vadodara Airport	Vadodara	Gujarat	BDQ	1,155,716	1,008,506	14.6	3
41	Tirupati Airport	Tirupati	Andhra Pradesh	TIR	834,652	584,732	42.7	2
42	Leh Kushok Bakula Rimpochee Airport	Leh	Ladakh	IXL	821,689	692,010	18.7	1
43	Raja Bhoj Airport	Bhopal	Madhya Pradesh	BHO	810,307	722,243	12.2	3
44	Jodhpur Airport	Jodhpur	Rajasthan	JDH	506,826	469,239	8.0	0
45	Hubli Airport	Hubli	Karnataka	HBX	460,462	49,227	835.4	0
46	Rajahmundry Airport	Rajahmundry	Andhra Pradesh	RJA	440,429	268,001	64.3	4
47	Silchar Airport	Silchar	Assam	IXS	386,665	366,955	5.4	2
48	Dibrugarh Airport	Dibrugarh	Assam	DIB	367,929	336,851	9.2	0
49	Aurangabad Airport	Aurangabad	Maharashtra	IXU	347,781	344,180	1.0	2
50	Rajkot Airport	Rajkot	Gujarat	RAJ	334,068	365,427	8.6	4

Source: Airports Authority of India

=== 2017-18 ===
Passenger traffic for FY 2017–18
Rank	Name	City	State/UT	IATA code	Passengers 2017–18	Passengers 2016-17	% Change	Rank change
1	Indira Gandhi International Airport	Delhi	Delhi	DEL	65,691,662	57,703,096	13.8	0
2	Chhatrapati Shivaji Maharaj International Airport	Mumbai	Maharashtra	BOM	48,496,430	45,154,345	7.4	0
3	Kempegowda International Airport	Bengaluru	Karnataka	BLR	26,910,431	22,881,392	24.1	0
4	Chennai International Airport	Chennai	Tamil Nadu	MAA	20,361,482	18,362,215	10.9	0
5	Netaji Subhas Chandra Bose International Airport	Kolkata	West Bengal	CCU	19,892,524	15,819,539	25.7	0
6	Rajiv Gandhi International Airport	Hyderabad	Telangana	HYD	18,156,789	15,102,672	20.2	0
7	Cochin International Airport	Kochi	Kerala	COK	10,172,839	8,955,441	13.6	0
8	Sardar Vallabhbhai Patel International Airport	Ahmedabad	Gujarat	AMD	9,174,425	7,405,282	23.9	0
9	Pune Airport	Pune	Maharashtra	PNQ	8,164,840	6,768,852	20.6	1
10	Dabolim Airport	Dabolim	Goa	GOI	7,607,249	6,856,362	11.0	1
11	Jaipur International Airport	Jaipur	Rajasthan	JAI	4,757,178	3,783,458	25.7	3
12	Chaudhary Charan Singh Airport	Lucknow	Uttar Pradesh	LKO	4,752,921	3,968,950	19.8	1
13	Lokpriya Gopinath Bordoloi International Airport	Guwahati	Assam	GAU	4,668,053	3,789,656	23.2	0
14	Trivandrum International Airport	Thiruvananthapuram	Kerala	TRV	4,393,469	3,881,509	13.2	2
15	Biju Patnaik Airport	Bhubaneswar	Odisha	BBI	3,250,635	2,332,433	39.4	2
16	Calicut International Airport	Kozhikode	Kerala	CCJ	3,139,432	2,651,088	28.4	1
17	Jaya Prakash Narayan Airport	Patna	Bihar	PAT	3,111,273	2,112,150	47.3	1
18	Coimbatore International Airport	Coimbatore	Tamil Nadu	CJB	2,903,935	2,104,904	27.2	2
19	Visakhapatnam Airport	Visakhapatnam	Andhra Pradesh	VTZ	2,480,379	2,358,029	5.2	2
20	Sheikh ul-Alam International Airport	Srinagar	Jammu and Kashmir	SXR	2,440,467	2,101,762	16.1	1
21	Sri Guru Ram Dass Jee International Airport	Amritsar	Punjab	ATQ	2,319,955	1,566,407	48.1	5
22	Devi Ahilyabai Holkar International Airport	Indore	Madhya Pradesh	IDR	2,269,971	1,784,073	27.2	2
23	Mangalore International Airport	Mangalore	Karnataka	IXE	2,269,949	1,734,810	30.8	2
24	Bagdogra Airport	Siliguri	West Bengal	IXB	2,255,768	1,524,516	48.0	3
25	Dr. Babasaheb Ambedkar International Airport	Nagpur	Maharashtra	NAG	2,186,137	1,891,475	15.6	3
26	Chandigarh Airport	Chandigarh	Chandigarh	IXC	2,137,739	1,825,881	17.1	3
27	Lal Bahadur Shastri Airport	Varanasi	Uttar Pradesh	VNS	2,087,581	1,916,454	8.9	6
28	Birsa Munda Airport	Ranchi	Jharkhand	IXR	1,778,349	1,035,740	71.7	7
29	Swami Vivekananda Airport	Raipur	Chhattisgarh	RPR	1,628,134	1,396,179	16.6	1
30	Veer Savarkar International Airport	Port Blair	Andaman and Nicobar	IXZ	1,549,951	1,238,331	25.2	0
31	Tiruchirappalli International Airport	Tiruchirappalli	Tamil Nadu	TRZ	1,513,273	1,359,447	11.3	2
32	Jammu Airport	Jammu	Jammu and Kashmir	IXJ	1,443,965	1,159,937	24.5	0
33	Madurai International Airport	Madurai	Tamil Nadu	IXM	1,442,807	978,919	47.4	3
34	Agartala Airport	Agartala	Tripura	IXA	1,379,090	1,183,867	16.5	3
35	Maharana Pratap Airport	Udaipur	Rajasthan	UDR	1,147,067	1,089,899	5.2	1
36	Jolly Grant Airport	Dehradun	Uttarakhand	DED	1,124,937	882,564	27.5	2
37	Vadodara Airport	Vadodara	Gujarat	BDQ	1,008,506	1,103,981	8.6	4
38	Imphal Airport	Imphal	Manipur	IMF	987,506	886,338	11.4	1
39	Vijayawada Airport	Vijayawada	Andhra Pradesh	VGA	746,392	622,354	19.9	1
40	Raja Bhoj Airport	Bhopal	Madhya Pradesh	BHO	722,243	676,015	6.8	1
41	Leh Kushok Bakula Rimpochee Airport	Leh	Ladakh	IXL	692,010	563,800	22.7	0
42	Surat Airport	Surat	Gujarat	STV	681,465	194,688	250	8
43	Tirupati Airport	Tirupati	Andhra Pradesh	TIR	584,732	486,029	20.3	1
44	Jodhpur Airport	Jodhpur	Rajasthan	JDH	469,239	350,583	33.8	0
45	Silchar Airport	Silchar	Assam	IXS	366,955	212,228	72.9	4
46	Rajkot Airport	Rajkot	Gujarat	RAJ	365,427	405,518	9.9	3
47	Aurangabad Airport	Aurangabad	Maharashtra	IXU	344,180	326,971	5.3	1
48	Dibrugarh Airport	Dibrugarh	Assam	DIB	336,851	305,796	10.2	2
49	Lengpui Airport	Aizawl	Mizoram	AJL	295,379	235,613	25.4	1
50	Rajahmundry Airport	Rajahmundry	Andhra Pradesh	RJA	268,001	261,348	2.5	3

Source: Airports Authority of India

=== 2016-17 ===
Passenger traffic for FY 2016–17
Rank	Name	City	State/UT	IATA code	Passengers 2016-17	Passengers 2015-16	% Change	Rank change
1	Indira Gandhi International Airport	Delhi	Delhi	DEL	57,703,096	48,424,165	19.2	0
2	Chhatrapati Shivaji Maharaj International Airport	Mumbai	Maharashtra	BOM	45,154,345	41,670,351	8.4	0
3	Kempegowda International Airport	Bengaluru	Karnataka	BLR	22,881,392	18,971,149	20.6	0
4	Chennai International Airport	Chennai	Tamil Nadu	MAA	17,718,017	15,218,017	14.2	0
5	Netaji Subhas Chandra Bose International Airport	Kolkata	West Bengal	CCU	15,819,539	12,761,007	24.0	0
6	Rajiv Gandhi International Airport	Hyderabad	Telangana	HYD	15,102,672	12,388,159	21.9	0
7	Cochin International Airport	Kochi	Kerala	COK	8,955,441	7,749,901	16.4	0
8	Sardar Vallabhbhai Patel International Airport	Ahmedabad	Gujarat	AMD	7,405,282	6,480,111	14.3	0
9	Dabolim Airport	Goa	Goa	GOI	6,856,362	5,375,555	27.5	1
10	Pune International Airport	Pune	Maharashtra	PNQ	6,787,391	5,417,167	25.3	1
11	Chaudhary Charan Singh International Airport	Lucknow	Uttar Pradesh	LKO	3,968,950	3,241,892	22.4	1
12	Trivandrum International Airport	Trivandrum	Kerala	TRV	3,881,509	3,470,788	11.8	1
13	Lokpriya Gopinath Bordoloi International Airport	Guwahati	Assam	GAU	3,789,656	2,784,315	36.1	1
14	Jaipur International Airport	Jaipur	Rajasthan	JAI	3,783,458	2,887,189	31.0	1
15	Calicut International Airport	Kozhikode	Kerala	CCJ	2,651,088	2,305,547	15.0	1
16	Visakhapatnam Airport	Visakhapatnam	Andhra Pradesh	VTZ	2,358,029	1,804,634	30.7	2
17	Biju Patnaik International Airport	Bhubaneswar	Odisha	BBI	2,332,433	1,894,732	23.1	0
18	Jay Prakash Narayan International Airport	Patna	Bihar	PAT	2,112,150	1,584,013	33.3	4
19	Coimbatore International Airport	Coimbatore	Tamil Nadu	CJB	2,104,904	1,691,553	24.4	1
20	Srinagar International Airport	Srinagar	Jammu and Kashmir	SXR	2,101,762	2,310,829	9.0	5
21	Lal Bahadur Shastri International Airport	Varanasi	Uttar Pradesh	VNS	1,916,454	1,383,962	38.5	4
22	Dr. Babasaheb Ambedkar International Airport	Nagpur	Maharashtra	NAG	1,891,475	1,595,241	18.6	0
23	Chandigarh International Airport	Chandigarh	Chandigarh	IXC	1,825,881	1,534,058	19.0	5
24	Devi Ahilyabai Holkar International Airport	Indore	Madhya Pradesh	IDR	1,784,073	1,692,892	5.4	5
25	Mangalore International Airport	Mangalore	Karnataka	IXE	1,734,810	1,674,251	3.6	4
26	Sri Guru Ram Dass Jee International Airport	Amritsar	Punjab	ATQ	1,566,407	1,250,370	25.3	1
27	Bagdogra Airport	Bagdogra	West Bengal	IXB	1,524,516	1,087,239	40.2	3
28	Swami Vivekananda Airport	Raipur	Chhattisgarh	RPR	1,396,179	1,206,844	15.2	3
29	Tiruchirappalli International Airport	Tiruchirappalli	Tamil Nadu	TRZ	1,359,447	1,297,212	4.8	3
30	Veer Savarkar International Airport	Port Blair	Andaman and Nicobar	IXZ	1,238,331	871,318	42.1	3
31	Agartala Airport	Agartala	Tripura	IXA	1,183,867	921,591	28.5	1
32	Jammu Airport	Jammu	Jammu and Kashmir	IXJ	1,159,937	1,117,252	3.8	3
33	Vadodara Airport	Vadodara	Gujarat	BDQ	1,103,981	931,092	18.6	2
34	Maharana Pratap Airport	Udaipur	Rajasthan	UDR	1,089,899	711,187	53.3	3
35	Birsa Munda Airport	Ranchi	Jharkhand	IXR	1,035,740	739,961	40.0	1
36	Madurai International Airport	Madurai	Tamil Nadu	IXM	978,919	842,300	16.2	2
37	Imphal Airport	Imphal	Manipur	IMF	886,338	766,877	15.6	2
38	Jolly Grant Airport	Dehradun	Uttarakhand	DED	882,564	471,542	87.2	1
39	Raja Bhoj International Airport	Bhopal	Madhya Pradesh	BHO	676,015	662,615	2.0	1
40	Vijayawada Airport	Vijayawada	Andhra Pradesh	VGA	622,354	398,643	56.1	2
41	Leh Kushok Bakula Rimpochee Airport	Leh	Ladakh	IXL	563,800	408,541	38.0	0
42	Tirupati Airport	Tirupati	Andhra Pradesh	TIR	486,029	371,060	31.0	1
43	Rajkot Airport	Rajkot	Gujarat	RAJ	405,518	413,207	1.9	3
44	Jodhpur Airport	Jodhpur	Rajasthan	JDH	350,583	301,859	16.1	1
45	Aurangabad Airport	Aurangabad	Maharashtra	IXU	326,971	301,046	8.6	1
46	Dibrugarh Airport	Dibrugarh	Assam	DIB	305,796	319,646	4.3	2
47	Rajahmundry Airport	Rajahmundry	Andhra Pradesh	RJA	261,348	223,903	16.7	0
48	Lengpui Airport	Aizawl	Mizoram	AJL	235,613	175,137	34.5	1
49	Silchar Airport	Silchar	Assam	IXS	212,228	200,855	5.7	1
50	Surat International Airport	Surat	Gujarat	STV	194,564	94,824	105.3	

Source: Airports Authority of India

=== 2015-16 ===
Passenger traffic for FY 2015–16
Rank	Name	City	State/UT	IATA code	Passengers 2015-16	Passengers 2014-15	% Change	Rank change
1	Indira Gandhi International Airport	Delhi	Delhi	DEL	48,424,165	40,895,555	18.1	0
2	Chhatrapati Shivaji Maharaj International Airport	Mumbai	Maharashtra	BOM	41,670,351	37,694,824	13.7	0
3	Kempegowda International Airport	Bengaluru	Karnataka	BLR	18,971,149	15,401,393	23.2	0
4	Chennai International Airport	Chennai	Tamil Nadu	MAA	15,218,017	14,299,200	6.4	0
5	Netaji Subhash Chandra Bose International Airport	Kolkata	West Bengal	CCU	12,421,244	10,916,669	13.8	0
6	Rajiv Gandhi International Airport	Hyderabad	Telangana	HYD	12,388,159	10,404,299	19.1	0
7	Cochin International Airport	Kochi	Kerala	COK	7,749,901	6,407,302	21.0	0
8	Sardar Vallabhbhai Patel International Airport	Ahmedabad	Gujarat	AMD	6,480,111	5,050,433	28.3	0
9	Pune International Airport	Pune	Maharashtra	PNQ	5,417,167	4,190,509	29.3	1
10	Dabolim Airport	Goa	Goa	GOI	5,375,555	4,513,201	19.1	1
11	Thiruvananthapuram International Airport	Thiruvananthapuram	Kerala	TRV	3,470,788	3,174,018	9.3	0
12	Chaudhary Charan Singh International Airport	Lucknow	Uttar Pradesh	LKO	3,241,892	2,541,241	27.6	1
13	Jaipur International Airport	Jaipur	Rajasthan	JAI	2,887,195	2,197,96	31.4	2
14	Lokpriya Gopinath Bordoloi International Airport	Guwahati	Assam	GAU	2,784,315	2,233,601	24.7	0
15	Srinagar Airport	Srinagar	Jammu and Kashmir	SXR	2,310,829	2,040,808	13.2	1
16	Kozhikode International Airport	Kozhikode	Kerala	CCJ	2,305,547	2,583,744	10.8	4
17	Biju Patnaik International Airport	Bhubaneswar	Odisha	BBI	1,894,732	1,493,359	26.9	0
18	Visakhapatnam Airport	Visakhapatnam	Andhra Pradesh	VTZ	1,804,634	1,099,480	64.1	7
19	Devi Ahilyabai Holkar Airport	Indore	Madhya Pradesh	IDR	1,692,892	1,353,300	25.1	1
20	Coimbatore International Airport	Coimbatore	Tamil Nadu	CJB	1,691,553	1,429,198	18.4	2
21	Mangalore International Airport	Mangalore	Karnataka	IXE	1,674,251	1,307,083	28.1	0
22	Dr. Babasaheb Ambedkar International Airport	Nagpur	Maharashtra	NAG	1,595,241	1,401,147	13.9	3
23	Lok Nayak Jayaprakash Airport	Patna	Bihar	PAT	1,584,013	1,196,540	32.4	0
24	Chandigarh International Airport	Chandigarh	Chandigarh	IXC	1,534,058	1,206,286	27.2	2
25	Lal Bahadur Shastri International Airport	Varanasi	Uttar Pradesh	VNS	1,383,982	1,020,118	35.7	3
26	Tiruchirappalli International Airport	Tiruchirappalli	Tamil Nadu	TRZ	1,297,212	1,189,218	9.1	2
27	Sri Guru Ram Dass Jee International Airport	Amritsar	Punjab	ATQ	1,250,370	1,083,684	15.4	1
28	Swami Vivekananda Airport	Raipur	Chhattisgarh	RPR	1,206,844	925,504	30.4	2
29	Jammu Airport	Jammu	Jammu and Kashmir	IXJ	1,117,252	952,641	17.3	0
30	Bagdogra Airport	Bagdogra	West Bengal	IXB	1,087,239	1,061,384	1.2	3
31	Vadodara Airport	Vadodara	Gujarat	BDQ	931,092	712,441	30.7	2
32	Agartala Airport	Agartala	Tripura	IXA	921,591	879,182	4.8	1
33	Veer Savarkar International Airport	Port Blair	Andaman and Nicobar	IXZ	871,318	815,873	6.8	1
34	Madurai International Airport	Madurai	Tamil Nadu	IXM	842,300	687,221	22.6	0
35	Imphal Airport	Imphal	Manipur	IMF	766,877	612,188	25.3	1
36	Birsa Munda Airport	Ranchi	Jharkhand	IXR	739,961	653,832	13.2	1
37	Maharana Pratap Airport	Udaipur	Rajasthan	UDR	711,187	457841	55.3	0
38	Raja Bhoj International Airport	Bhopal	Madhya Pradesh	BHO	662,615	416,284	59.2	1
39	Jolly Grant Airport	Dehradun	Uttrakhand	DED	471,542	378,646	24.5	2
40	Rajkot Airport	Rajkot	Gujarat	RAJ	413,207	358,402	15.3	2
41	Leh Kushok Bakula Rimpochee Airport	Leh	Ladakh	IXL	408,541	403,211	1.3	1
42	Vijayawada Airport	Vijayawada	Andhra Pradesh	VGA	398,643	231,931	71.9	4
43	Tirupati Airport	Tirupati	Andhra Pradesh	TIR	371,060	245,049	51.4	2
44	Dibrugarh Airport	Dibrugarh	Assam	DIB	319,646	319,260	0.1	1
45	Jodhpur Airport	Jodhpur	Rajasthan	JDH	301,859	295,863	2.0	1
46	Aurangabad Airport	Aurangabad	Maharashtra	IXU	301,046	426,855	29.5	8
47	Rajahmundry Airport	Rajahmundry	Andhra Pradesh	RJA	223,903	153,721	45.7	0
48	Silchar Airport	Silchar	Assam	IXS	200,855	189,370	6.1	0
49	Lengpui Airport	Aizawl	Mizoram	AJL	175,137	162,651	7.7	0
50	Jabalpur Airport	Jabalpur	Madhya Pradesh	JLR	153,409	101,232	51.5	0

Source: Airports Authority of India

== Aircraft movement ==
=== 2022-23 ===
Aircraft movement for FY 2022–23
Rank	Name	City	State/UT	IATA code	Aircraft movement 2022–23	Aircraft movement 2021–22	% Change
1	Indira Gandhi International Airport	Delhi	Delhi	DEL	429,964	319,571	▲34.5
2	Chhatrapati Shivaji Maharaj International Airport	Mumbai	Maharashtra	BOM	290,387	186,186	▲56
3	Kempegowda International Airport	Bangalore	Karnataka	BLR	223,223	148,014	▲50.8
4	Rajiv Gandhi International Airport	Hyderabad	Telangana	HYD	158,747	113,926	▲39.3
5	Netaji Subhas Chandra Bose International Airport	Kolkata	West Bengal	CCU	137,693	91,602	▲50.3
6	Chennai International Airport	Chennai	Tamil Nadu	MAA	137,298	99,865	▲37.5
7	Sardar Vallabhbhai Patel International Airport	Ahmedabad	Gujarat	AMD	80,026	51,157	▲56.4
8	Pune International Airport	Pune	Maharashtra	PNQ	59,451	30,821	▲92.9
9	Cochin International Airport	Kochi	Kerala	COK	58,278	40,386	▲44.3
10	Dabolim Airport	Goa	Goa	GOI	56,904	40,310	▲41.2
11	Lokpriya Gopinath Bordoloi International Airport	Guwahati	Assam	GAU	45,909	33,572	▲36.7
12	Chaudhary Charan Singh International Airport	Lucknow	Uttar Pradesh	LKO	42,276	30,005	▲40.9
13	Jaipur International Airport	Jaipur	Rajasthan	JAI	41,156	27,157	▲51.5
14	Biju Patnaik International Airport	Bhubaneshwar	Odisha	BBI	30,745	19,417	▲58.3
15	Srinagar International Airport	Srinagar	Jammu and Kashmir	SXR	29,972	24,441	▲22.6
16	Chandigarh Airport	Chandigarh	Chandigarh	IXC	29,042	20,895	▲39
17	Jay Prakash Narayan Airport	Patna	Bihar	PAT	27,931	25,501	▲9.5
18	Devi Ahilyabai Holkar Airport	Indore	Madhya Pradesh	IDR	25,184	16,498	▲52.6
19	Trivandrum International Airport	Thiruvananthapuram	Kerala	TRV	24,594	15,356	▲60.2
20	Calicut International Airport	Kozhikode	Kerala	CCJ	23,142	15,008	▲54.2
21	Visakhapatnam International Airport	Visakhapatnam	Andhra Pradesh	VTZ	20,961	14,878	▲40.9
22	Swami Vivekananda Airport	Raipur	Chhattisgarh	RPR	20,635	15,107	▲36.6
23	Dr. Babasaheb Ambedkar International Airport	Nagpur	Maharashtra	NAG	20,440	14,135	▲44.6
24	Sri Guru Ram Dass Jee International Airport	Amritsar	Punjab	ATQ	19,521	13,503	▲44.6
25	Lal Bahadur Shastri Airport	Varanasi	Uttar Pradesh	VNS	19,158	16,143	▲18.7
26	Birsa Munda Airport	Ranchi	Jharkhand	IXR	18,792	14,871	▲26.4
27	Juhu Aerodrome	Mumbai	Maharashtra		18,762	16,256	▲15.4
28	Bagdogra Airport	Siliguri	West Bengal	IXB	17,932	16,250	▲10.4
29	Coimbatore International Airport	Coimbatore	Tamil Nadu	CJB	17,642	11,020	▲60.1
30	Jolly Grant Airport	Dehradun	Uttarakhand	DED	16,652	12,142	▲37.1
31	Vijayawada International Airport	Vijayawada	Andhra Pradesh	VGA	14,593	9,258	▲57.6
32	Surat International Airport	Surat	Gujarat	STV	14,462	10,429	▲38.7
33	Mangalore Airport	Mangalore	Karnataka	IXE	14,382	9,980	▲44.1
34	Jammu Airport	Jammu	Jammu and Kashmir	IXJ	13,975	12,347	▲13.2
35	Tiruchirappalli International Airport	Tiruchirapalli	Tamil Nadu	TRZ	13,222	6,878	▲92.2
36	Raja Bhoj Airport	Bhopal	Madhya Pradesh	BHO	12,350	9,699	▲27.3
37	Agartala Airport	Agartala	Tripura	IXA	12,203	8,272	▲47.5
38	Imphal Airport	Imphal	Manipur	IMF	12,098	8,811	▲37.3
39	Kannur International Airport	Kannur	Kerala	CNN	12,024	9,810	▲22.6
40	Madurai International Airport	Madurai	Tamil Nadu	IXM	11,119	7,538	▲47.5
41	Maharana Pratap Airport	Udaipur	Rajasthan	UDR	10,985	8,156	▲34.7
42	Veer Savarkar International Airport	Port Blair	Andaman and Nicobar	IXZ	10,918	7,364	▲48.3
43	Tirupati Airport	Tirupati	Andhra Pradesh	TIR	10,720	8,158	▲31.4
44	Rajahmundry Airport	Rajahmundry	Andhra Pradesh	RJA	9,812	7,019	▲39.8
45	Leh Kushok Bakula Rimpochee Airport	Leh	Ladakh	IXL	9,068	8,704	▲4.2
46	Vadodara Airport	Vadodara	Gujarat	BDQ	7,997	4,711	▲69.8
47	Prayagraj Airport	Prayagraj	Uttar Pradesh	IXD	7,962	6,450	▲23.4
48	Rajkot Airport	Rajkot	Gujarat	RAJ	7,662	4,244	▲80.5
49	Jodhpur Airport	Jodhpur	Rajasthan	JDH	7,572	6,356	▲19.1
50	Dibrugarh Airport	Dibrugarh	Assam	DIB	7,382	5,394	▲36.9

Source: Airports Authority of India

=== 2021-22 ===
Aircraft movement for FY 2021–22
Rank	Name	City	State/UT	IATA code	Aircraft movement 2021–22	Aircraft movement 2020–21	% Change
1	Indira Gandhi International Airport	Delhi	Delhi	DEL	319,571	213,986	▲49.3
2	Chhatrapati Shivaji Maharaj International Airport	Mumbai	Maharashtra	BOM	186,186	115,864	▲60.7
3	Kempegowda International Airport	Bangalore	Karnataka	BLR	148,014	113,651	▲30.2
4	Rajiv Gandhi International Airport	Hyderabad	Telangana	HYD	113,926	86,015	▲32.4
5	Netaji Subhas Chandra Bose International Airport	Kolkata	West Bengal	CCU	99,865	72,170	▲38.4
6	Chennai International Airport	Chennai	Tamil Nadu	MAA	91,602	64,590	▲41.8
7	Sardar Vallabhbhai Patel International Airport	Ahmedabad	Gujarat	AMD	51,157	40,209	▲27.2
8	Cochin International Airport	Kochi	Kerala	COK	40,386	24,912	▲62.1
9	Dabolim Airport	Goa	Goa	GOI	40,310	22,141	▲82.1
10	Lokpriya Gopinath Bordoloi International Airport	Guwahati	Assam	GAU	33,572	23,442	▲43.2
11	Pune International Airport	Pune	Maharashtra	PNQ	30,821	19,831	▲55.4
12	Chaudhary Charan Singh International Airport	Lucknow	Uttar Pradesh	LKO	30,005	22,954	▲30.7
13	Jaipur International Airport	Jaipur	Rajasthan	JAI	27,157	18,933	▲43.4
14	Jay Prakash Narayan Airport	Patna	Bihar	PAT	25,501	21,572	▲18.2
15	Srinagar International Airport	Srinagar	Jammu and Kashmir	SXR	24,441	13,072	▲87
16	Chandigarh Airport	Chandigarh	Chandigarh	IXC	20,895	12,884	▲62.2
17	Biju Patnaik International Airport	Bhubaneshwar	Odisha	BBI	19,417	14,265	▲36.1
18	Devi Ahilyabai Holkar Airport	Indore	Madhya Pradesh	IDR	16,498	9,966	▲65.5
19	Juhu Aerodrome	Mumbai	Maharashtra		16,256	15,790	▲3
20	Bagdogra Airport	Siliguri	West Bengal	IXB	16,250	10,784	▲50.7
21	Lal Bahadur Shastri Airport	Varanasi	Uttar Pradesh	VNS	16,143	14,396	▲12.1
22	Trivandrum International Airport	Thiruvananthapuram	Kerala	TRV	15,356	9,313	▲64.9
23	Swami Vivekananda Airport	Raipur	Chhattisgarh	RPR	15,107	10,635	▲42
24	Calicut International Airport	Kozhikode	Kerala	CCJ	15,008	8,938	▲67.9
25	Visakhapatnam International Airport	Visakhapatnam	Andhra Pradesh	VTZ	14,878	10,667	▲39.5
26	Birsa Munda Airport	Ranchi	Jharkhand	IXR	14,871	8,747	▲70
27	Dr. Babasaheb Ambedkar International Airport	Nagpur	Maharashtra	NAG	14,135	9,282	▲52.3
28	Sri Guru Ram Dass Jee International Airport	Amritsar	Punjab	ATQ	13,503	8,016	▲68.5
29	Jammu Airport	Jammu	Jammu and Kashmir	IXJ	12,347	8,200	▲50.6
30	Jolly Grant Airport	Dehradun	Uttarakhand	DED	12,142	7,821	▲55.2
31	Coimbatore International Airport	Coimbatore	Tamil Nadu	CJB	11,020	8,143	▲35.3
32	Surat International Airport	Surat	Gujarat	STV	10,429	5,755	▲81.2
33	Mangalore Airport	Mangalore	Karnataka	IXE	9,980	6,664	▲49.8
34	Kannur International Airport	Kannur	Kerala	CNN	9,810	6,306	▲55.6
35	Raja Bhoj Airport	Bhopal	Madhya Pradesh	BHO	9,699	5,672	▲71
36	Vijayawada International Airport	Vijayawada	Andhra Pradesh	VGA	9,258	7,423	▲24.7
37	Imphal Airport	Imphal	Manipur	IMF	8,811	5,681	▲55.1
38	Leh Kushok Bakula Rimpochee Airport	Leh	Ladakh	IXL	8,704	2,960	▲194.1
39	Agartala Airport	Agartala	Tripura	IXA	8,272	5,063	▲63.4
40	Tirupati Airport	Tirupati	Andhra Pradesh	TIR	8,158	4,612	▲76.9
41	Maharana Pratap Airport	Udaipur	Rajasthan	UDR	8,156	4,055	▲101.1
42	Madurai International Airport	Madurai	Tamil Nadu	IXM	7,538	5,529	▲36.3
43	Veer Savarkar International Airport	Port Blair	Andaman and Nicobar	IXZ	7,364	4,801	▲53.4
44	Rajahmundry Airport	Rajahmundry	Andhra Pradesh	RJA	7,019	5,682	▲23.5
45	Tiruchirappalli International Airport	Tiruchirapalli	Tamil Nadu	TRZ	6,878	4,645	▲48.1
46	Gorakhpur Airport	Gorakhpur	Uttar Pradesh	GOP	6,639	4,906	▲35.3
47	Prayagraj Airport	Prayagraj	Uttar Pradesh	IXD	6,450	4,010	▲60.8
48	Belgaum Airport	Belgaum	Karnataka	IXG	6,440	5,987	▲7.6
49	Jodhpur Airport	Jodhpur	Rajasthan	JDH	6,356	1,878	▲238.4
50	Dibrugarh Airport	Dibrugarh	Assam	DIB	5,394	3,766	▲43.2

Source: Airports Authority of India

=== 2020-21 ===
Aircraft movement for FY 2020–21
Rank	Name	City	State/UT	IATA code	Aircraft 2020–21	Aircraft 2019–20	% change
1	Indira Gandhi International Airport	Delhi	Delhi	DEL	213,986	450,012	▼-52.4
2	Chhatrapati Shivaji Maharaj International Airport	Mumbai	Maharashtra	BOM	115,864	304,675	▼-62
3	Kempegowda International Airport	Bangalore	Karnataka	BLR	113,651	230,359	▼-50.7
4	Rajiv Gandhi International Airport	Hyderabad	Telangana	HYD	86,015	183,450	▼-53.1
5	Chennai International Airport	Chennai	Tamil Nadu	MAA	72,170	165,761	▼-56.5
6	Netaji Subhas Chandra Bose International Airport	Kolkata	West Bengal	CCU	64,590	167,982	▼-61.5
7	Sardar Vallabhbhai Patel International Airport	Ahmedabad	Gujarat	AMD	40,209	845,77	▼-52.5
8	Cochin International Airport	Kochi	Kerala	COK	24,912	661,06	▼-62.3
9	Lokpriya Gopinath Bordoloi International Airport	Guwahati	Assam	GAU	23,442	455,39	▼-48.5
10	Chaudhary Charan Singh International Airport	Lucknow	Uttar Pradesh	LKO	22,954	384,94	▼-40.4
11	Dabolim Airport	Goa	Goa	GOI	22,141	576,55	▼-61.6
12	Jay Prakash Narayan Airport	Patna	Bihar	PAT	21,572	309,59	▼-30.3
13	Pune International Airport	Pune	Maharashtra	PNQ	19,831	542,61	▼-63.5
14	Jaipur International Airport	Jaipur	Rajasthan	JAI	18,933	394,84	▼-52
15	Juhu Aerodrome	Mumbai	Maharashtra		15,790	224,32	▼-29.6
16	Lal Bahadur Shastri Airport	Varanasi	Uttar Pradesh	VNS	14,396	240,56	▼-40.2
17	Biju Patnaik International Airport	Bhubaneshwar	Odisha	BBI	14,265	279,31	▼-48.9
18	Srinagar International Airport	Srinagar	Jammu and Kashmir	SXR	13,072	196,55	▼-33.5
19	Chandigarh Airport	Chandigarh	Chandigarh	IXC	12,884	183,21	▼-29.7
20	Bagdogra Airport	Siliguri	West Bengal	IXB	10,784	232,18	▼-53.6
21	Visakhapatnam International Airport	Visakhapatnam	Andhra Pradesh	VTZ	10,667	209,35	▼-49
22	Swami Vivekananda Airport	Raipur	Chhattisgarh	RPR	10,635	172,77	▼-38.4
23	Devi Ahilyabai Holkar Airport	Indore	Madhya Pradesh	IDR	9,966	22,935	▼-56.5
24	Trivandrum International Airport	Thiruvananthapuram	Kerala	TRV	9,313	28,842	▼-67.7
25	Dr. Babasaheb Ambedkar International Airport	Nagpur	Maharashtra	NAG	9,282	23,093	▼-59.8
26	Calicut International Airport	Kozhikode	Kerala	CCJ	8,938	25,355	▼-64.7
27	Birsa Munda Airport	Ranchi	Jharkhand	IXR	8,747	19,137	▼-54.3
28	Jammu Airport	Jammu	Jammu and Kashmir	IXJ	8,200	14,088	▼-41.8
29	Coimbatore International Airport	Coimbatore	Tamil Nadu	CJB	8,143	22,303	▼-63.5
30	Sri Guru Ram Dass Jee International Airport	Amritsar	Punjab	ATQ	8,016	17,081	▼-53.1
31	Jolly Grant Airport	Dehradun	Uttarakhand	DED	7,821	13,127	▼-40.4
32	Vijayawada International Airport	Vijayawada	Andhra Pradesh	VGA	7,423	15,242	▼-51.3
33	Mangalore Airport	Mangalore	Karnataka	IXE	6,664	15,685	▼-57.5
34	Kannur International Airport	Kannur	Kerala	CNN	6,306	15,131	▼-58.3
35	Belgaum Airport	Belgavi	Karnataka	IXG	5,987	5,738	▲4.3
36	Surat International Airport	Surat	Gujarat	STV	5,755	15,855	▼-63.7
37	Rajahmundry Airport	Rajahmundry	Andhra Pradesh	RJA	5,682	9,686	▼-41.3
38	Imphal Airport	Imphal	Manipur	IMF	5,681	9,912	▼-42.7
39	Raja Bhoj Airport	Bhopal	Madhya Pradesh	BHO	5,672	14,374	▼-60.5
40	Madurai International Airport	Madurai	Tamil Nadu	IXM	5,529	15,925	▼-65.3
41	Agartala Airport	Agartala	Tripura	IXA	5,063	11,118	▼-54.5
42	Gorakhpur Airport	Gorakhpur	Uttar Pradesh	GOP	4,906	5,032	▼-2.5
43	Veer Savarkar International Airport	Port Blair	Andaman and Nicobar	IXZ	4,801	14,235	▼-66.3
44	Tiruchirappalli International Airport	Tiruchirapalli	Tamil Nadu	TRZ	4,645	14,260	▼-67.4
45	Tirupati Airport	Tirupati	Andhra Pradesh	TIR	4,612	9,699	▼-52.4
46	Maharana Pratap Airport	Udaipur	Rajasthan	UDR	4,055	10,885	▼-62.7
47	Prayagraj Airport	Prayagraj	Uttar Pradesh	IXD	4,010	4,056	▼-1.1
48	Dibrugarh Airport	Dibrugarh	Assam	DIB	3,766	5,502	▼-31.6
49	Mysore Airport	Mysore	Karnataka	MYQ	3,513	3,147	▲11.6
50	Veer Surendra Sai Airport	Jharsuguda	Odisha	JRG	3,472	3,286	▲5.7

Source: Airports Authority of India

=== 2019-20 ===
Aircraft movement for FY 2019–20
Rank	Name	City	State/UT	IATA code	Aircraft movement 2019-20	Aircraft movement 2018-19	% change
1	Indira Gandhi International Airport	Delhi	Delhi	DEL	450,012	460,429	2.3
2	Chhatrapati Shivaji Maharaj International Airport	Mumbai	Maharashtra	BOM	304,675	321,263	5.2
3	Kempegowda International Airport	Bangalore	Karnataka	BLR	230,359	239,395	3.8
4	Rajiv Gandhi International Airport	Hyderabad	Telangana	HYD	183,450	179,606	2.1
5	Chennai International Airport	Chennai	Tamil Nadu	MAA	167,962	178,079	3.8
6	Netaji Subhas Chandra Bose International Airport	Kolkata	West Bengal	CCU	165,761	162,026	2.3
7	Sardar Vallabhbhai Patel International Airport	Ahmedabad	Gujarat	AMD	84,577	78,412	27.2
8	Cochin International Airport	Kochi	Kerala	COK	66,106	71,057	3.3
10	Dabolim Airport	Goa	Goa	GOI	57,655	56,946	1.6
10	Pune International Airport	Pune	Maharashtra	PNQ	54,261	59,888	9.0
11	Lokpriya Gopinath Bordoloi International Airport	Guwahati	Assam	GAU	45,539	50,488	2.6
12	Jaipur International Airport	Jaipur	Rajasthan	JAI	39,484	46,185	14.5
13	Chaudhary Charan Singh International Airport	Lucknow	Uttar Pradesh	LKO	38,494	41,752	1.7
14	Jay Prakash Narayan Airport	Patna	Bihar	PAT	30,959	28,087	10.2
15	Trivandrum International Airport	Thiruvananthapuram	Kerala	TRV	28,842	33,093	12.9
16	Biju Patnaik International Airport	Bhubaneshwar	Odisha	BBI	27,931	30,390	8.2
17	Calicut International Airport	Kozhikode	Kerala	CCJ	25,355	26,738	5.3
18	Lal Bahadur Shastri Airport	Varanasi	Uttar Pradesh	VNS	24,056	21,818	10.3
19	Bagdogra Airport	Siliguri	West Bengal	IXB	23,218	21,081	5
20	Dr. Babasaheb Ambedkar International Airport	Nagpur	Maharashtra	NAG	23,093	22,640	3.1
21	Devi Ahilyabai Holkar Airport	Indore	Madhya Pradesh	IDR	22,935	26,442	4.5
22	Coimbatore International Airport	Coimbatore	Tamil Nadu	CJB	22,303	25,253	11.9
23	Visakhapatnam International Airport	Visakhapatnam	Andhra Pradesh	VTZ	20,935	23,695	6.9
24	Srinagar International Airport	Srinagar	Jammu and Kashmir	SXR	19,655	18,746	4.6
25	Birsa Munda Airport	Ranchi	Jharkhand	IXR	19,137	16,869	12.4
26	Chandigarh Airport	Chandigarh	Chandigarh	IXC	18,321	17,003	9.1
27	Swami Vivekananda Airport	Raipur	Chhattisgarh	RPR	17,277	16,901	2.2
28	Sri Guru Ram Dass Jee International Airport	Amritsar	Punjab	ATQ	17,081	17,905	4.8
29	Madurai International Airport	Madurai	Tamil Nadu	IXM	15,925	15,517	4.3
30	Surat International Airport	Surat	Gujarat	STV	15,855	14,548	8.9
31	Mangalore Airport	Mangalore	Karnataka	IXE	15,685	19,365	19
32	Vijayawada International Airport	Vijayawada	Andhra Pradesh	VGA	15,242	19,026	19.9
33	Raja Bhoj Airport	Bhopal	Madhya Pradesh	BHO	14,371	8,860	62.2
34	Tiruchirappalli International Airport	Tiruchirapalli	Tamil Nadu	TRZ	14,260	14,929	1.6
35	Veer Savarkar International Airport	Port Blair	Andaman and Nicobar	IXZ	14,235	14,754	4.0
36	Jammu Airport	Jammu	Jammu and Kashmir	IXJ	14,033	14,378	2.4
37	Jolly Grant Airport	Dehradun	Uttarakhand	DED	13,127	12,517	1.9
38	Agartala Airport	Agartala	Tripura	IXA	11,118	10,130	9
39	Maharana Pratap Airport	Udaipur	Rajasthan	UDR	10,885	11,967	9.6
40	Imphal Airport	Imphal	Manipur	IMF	9,912	10,010	8.6
41	Tirupati Airport	Tirupati	Andhra Pradesh	TIR	9,700	10,587	7.4
42	Rajahmundry Airport	Rajahmundry	Andhra Pradesh	RJA	9,686	11,316	14.4
43	Vadodara Airport	Vadodara	Gujarat	BDQ	7,855	8,716	18.8
44	Hubli Airport	Hubli	Karnataka	HBX	6,944	6,757	2.2
45	Shirdi Airport	Shirdi	Maharashtra	SAG	6,226	3,064	103.2
46	Leh Kushok Bakula Rimpochee Airport	Leh	Ladakh	IXL	5,986	6,594	10.2
47	Belgaum Airport	Belgaum	Karnataka	IXG	5,738	1,176	387.4
48	Dibrugarh Airport	Dibrugarh	Assam	DIB	5,502	3,839	43
49	Jabalpur Airport	Jabalpur	Madhya Pradesh	JLR	5,453	4,243	35.6
50	Gorakhpur Airport	Gorakhpur	Uttar Pradesh	GOP	5,032	2,031	147.8

Source: Airports Authority of India

=== 2018-19 ===
Aircraft movement for FY 2018–19
Rank	Name	City	State/UT	IATA code	Aircraft movement 2018-19	Aircraft movement 2017-18	% change
1	Indira Gandhi International Airport	Delhi	Delhi	DEL	460,429	441,299	4.3
2	Chhatrapati Shivaji Maharaj International Airport	Mumbai	Maharashtra	BOM	321,263	320,689	0.2
3	Kempegowda International Airport	Bangalore	Karnataka	BLR	239,395	196,560	21.8
4	Rajiv Gandhi International Airport	Hyderabad	Telangana	HYD	179,606	149,581	20.1
5	Chennai International Airport	Chennai	Tamil Nadu	MAA	178,079	155,123	14.8
6	Netaji Subhas Chandra Bose International Airport	Kolkata	West Bengal	CCU	162,026	148,802	8.9
7	Sardar Vallabhbhai Patel International Airport	Ahmedabad	Gujarat	AMD	78,412	63,129	24.2
8	Cochin International Airport	Kochi	Kerala	COK	71,057	68,772	3.3
9	Pune International Airport	Pune	Maharashtra	PNQ	59,888	56,021	6.9
10	Dabolim Airport	Goa	Goa	GOI	56,946	50,567	12.6
11	Lokpriya Gopinath Bordoloi International Airport	Guwahati	Assam	GAU	50,488	41,172	22.6
11	Jaipur International Airport	Jaipur	Rajasthan	JAI	46,185	42,289	9.2
13	Chaudhary Charan Singh International Airport	Lucknow	Uttar Pradesh	LKO	41,752	36,413	14.7
14	Trivandrum International Airport	Thiruvananthapuram	Kerala	TRV	33,093	33,738	1.9
15	Biju Patnaik International Airport	Bhubaneshwar	Odisha	BBI	30,390	23,155	31.2
16	Jay Prakash Narayan Airport	Patna	Bihar	PAT	28,087	21,916	28.2
17	Calicut International Airport	Kozhikode	Kerala	CCJ	26,738	24,910	7.3
18	Devi Ahilyabai Holkar Airport	Indore	Madhya Pradesh	IDR	26,442	18,692	41.5
19	Coimbatore International Airport	Coimbatore	Tamil Nadu	CJB	25,253	21,595	16.9
20	Visakhapatnam International Airport	Visakhapatnam	Andhra Pradesh	VTZ	23,695	19,595	20.9
21	Dr. Babasaheb Ambedkar International Airport	Nagpur	Maharashtra	NAG	22,640	16,879	34.1
22	Vijayawada International Airport	Vijayawada	Andhra Pradesh	VGA	22,630	11,998	88.6
23	Lal Bahadur Shastri Airport	Varanasi	Uttar Pradesh	VNS	21,818	15,658	39.3
24	Bagdogra Airport	Siliguri	West Bengal	IXB	21,081	15,954	32.1
25	Juhu Aerodrome	Mumbai	Maharashtra	—	20,275	22,706	10.7
26	Mangalore Airport	Mangalore	Karnataka	IXE	19,365	19,636	1.4
27	Srinagar International Airport	Srinagar	Jammu and Kashmir	SXR	18,746	17,918	4.6
28	Sri Guru Ram Dass Jee International Airport	Amritsar	Punjab	ATQ	17,905	17,767	0.8
29	Chandigarh Airport	Chandigarh	Chandigarh	IXC	17,003	18,715	9.1
30	Swami Vivekananda Airport	Raipur	Chhattisgarh	RPR	16,901	12,802	32.0
31	Birsa Munda Airport	Ranchi	Jharkhand	IXR	16,869	15,009	12.4
32	Madurai International Airport	Madurai	Tamil Nadu	IXM	15,517	13,578	14.3
33	Tiruchirappalli International Airport	Tiruchirapalli	Tamil Nadu	TRZ	14,929	12,801	16.6
34	Veer Savarkar International Airport	Port Blair	Andaman and Nicobar	IXZ	14,754	14,190	4.0
35	Surat Airport	Surat	Gujarat	STV	14,548	10,762	35.2
36	Jammu Airport	Jammu	Jammu and Kashmir	IXJ	14,033	14,378	2.4
37	Jolly Grant Airport	Dehradun	Uttarakhand	DED	12,517	12,281	1.9
38	Maharana Pratap Airport	Udaipur	Rajasthan	UDR	11,767	9,842	19.6
39	Rajahmundry Airport	Rajahmundry	Andhra Pradesh	RJA	11,316	8,570	32.0
40	Tirupati Airport	Tirupati	Andhra Pradesh	TIR	10,587	7,181	47.4
41	Agartala Airport	Agartala	Tripura	IXA	10,130	10,074	0.6
42	Imphal Airport	Imphal	Manipur	IMF	10,010	6,737	48.6
43	Raja Bhoj Airport	Bhopal	Madhya Pradesh	BHO	8,860	7,205	23.0
44	Vadodara Airport	Vadodara	Gujarat	BDQ	8,716	7,338	18.8
45	Hubli Airport	Hubli	Karnataka	HBX	6,757	1,086	522.2
46	Leh Kushok Bakula Rimpochee Airport	Leh	Ladakh	IXL	6,594	5,982	10.2
47	Jodhpur Airport	Jodhpur	Rajasthan	JDH	5,540	5,985	7.4
48	Jabalpur Airport	Jabalpur	Madhya Pradesh	JLR	4,243	3,945	7.6
49	Silchar Airport	Silchar	Assam	IXS	3,984	4,382	9.1
50	Dibrugarh Airport	Dibrugarh	Assam	DIB	3,839	2,706	41.9

Source: Airports Authority of India

=== 2017-18 ===
Aircraft movement for FY 2017–18
Rank	Name	City	State/UT	IATA code	Aircraft movement 2017-18	Aircraft movement 2016-17	% change
1	Indira Gandhi International Airport	Delhi	Delhi	DEL	441,299	397,799	10.9
2	Chhatrapati Shivaji Maharaj International Airport	Mumbai	Maharashtra	BOM	320,689	305,465	5.0
3	Kempegowda International Airport	Bangalore	Karnataka	BLR	196,560	177,271	10.9
4	Chennai International Airport	Chennai	Tamil Nadu	MAA	155,123	147,767	5.0
5	Rajiv Gandhi International Airport	Hyderabad	Telangana	HYD	149,581	130,713	14.4
6	Netaji Subhas Chandra Bose International Airport	Kolkata	West Bengal	CCU	148,802	124,154	19.9
7	Cochin International Airport	Kochi	Kerala	COK	68,772	61,688	11.5
8	Sardar Vallabhbhai Patel International Airport	Ahmedabad	Gujarat	AMD	63,129	51,107	23.5
9	Pune International Airport	Pune	Maharashtra	PNQ	56,021	46,932	19.7
10	Dabolim Airport	Goa	Goa	GOI	50,567	47,801	5.8
11	Jaipur International Airport	Jaipur	Rajasthan	JAI	42,289	32,340	30.8
12	Lokpriya Gopinath Bordoloi International Airport	Guwahati	Assam	GAU	41,172	37,873	8.7
13	Chaudhary Charan Singh International Airport	Lucknow	Uttar Pradesh	LKO	36,413	29,356	24.0
14	Trivandrum International Airport	Thiruvananthapuram	Kerala	TRV	33,738	29,117	15.9
15	Calicut International Airport	Kozhikode	Kerala	CCJ	24,910	19,726	26.3
16	Biju Patnaik International Airport	Bhubaneshwar	Odisha	BBI	23,155	17,078	35.6
17	Jay Prakash Narayan Airport	Patna	Bihar	PAT	21,916	15,508	41.3
18	Coimbatore International Airport	Coimbatore	Tamil Nadu	CJB	21,595	20,722	4.2
19	Mangalore Airport	Mangalore	Karnataka	IXE	19,636	15,405	27.5
20	Visakhapatnam Airport	Visakhapatnam	Andhra Pradesh	VTZ	19,595	19,550	0.2
21	Chandigarh Airport	Chandigarh	Chandigarh	IXC	18,715	15,254	22.7
22	Devi Ahilyabai Holkar Airport	Indore	Madhya Pradesh	IDR	18,692	14,396	29.8
23	Srinagar International Airport	Srinagar	Jammu and Kashmir	SXR	17,918	15,543	15.3
24	Sri Guru Ram Dass Jee International Airport	Amritsar	Punjab	ATQ	17,767	11,606	53.1
25	Dr. Babasaheb Ambedkar International Airport	Nagpur	Maharashtra	NAG	16,879	16,062	5.1
26	Bagdogra Airport	Siliguri	West Bengal	IXB	15,954	11,599	37.5
27	Lal Bahadur Shastri Airport	Varanasi	Uttar Pradesh	VNS	15,658	15,035	4.1
28	Birsa Munda Airport	Ranchi	Jharkhand	IXR	15,009	9,051	65.8
29	Jammu Airport	Jammu	Jammu and Kashmir	IXJ	14,378	10,852	32.5
30	Veer Savarkar International Airport	Port Blair	Andaman and Nicobar	IXZ	14,190	12,524	13.3
31	Madurai International Airport	Madurai	Tamil Nadu	IXM	13,578	11,671	16.3
32	Swami Vivekananda Airport	Raipur	Chhattisgarh	RPR	12,802	11,280	13.5
33	Tiruchirappalli International Airport	Tiruchirapalli	Tamil Nadu	TRZ	12,801	11,165	14.7
34	Jolly Grant Airport	Dehradun	Uttarakhand	DED	12,281	9,485	29.5
35	Vijayawada Airport	Vijayawada	Andhra Pradesh	VGA	11,998	10,333	16.1
36	Surat Airport	Surat	Gujarat	STV	10,762	4,651	131.4
37	Agartala Airport	Agartala	Tripura	IXA	10,074	8,899	13.8
38	Maharana Pratap Airport	Udaipur	Rajasthan	UDR	9,842	9,084	8.3
39	Rajahmundry Airport	Rajahmundry	Andhra Pradesh	RJA	8,570	7,846	9.2
40	Vadodara Airport	Vadodara	Gujarat	BDQ	7,338	8,330	11.9
41	Raja Bhoj Airport	Bhopal	Madhya Pradesh	BHO	7,205	6,949	3.7
42	Tirupati Airport	Tirupati	Andhra Pradesh	TIR	7,181	6,612	8.6
43	Imphal Airport	Imphal	Manipur	IMF	6,737	6,598	2.1
44	Jodhpur Airport	Jodhpur	Rajasthan	JDH	5,985	3,732	60.4
45	Leh Kushok Bakula Rimpochee Airport	Leh	Ladakh	IXL	5,982	4,904	22.0
46	Rajkot Airport	Rajkot	Gujarat	RAJ	4,499	4,610	2.4
47	Silchar Airport	Silchar	Assam	IXS	4,382	3,205	36.7
48	Jabalpur Airport	Jabalpur	Madhya Pradesh	JLR	3,945	3048	29.4
49	Aurangabad Airport	Aurangabad	Maharashtra	IXU	3,758	3,799	1.1
50	Lengpui Airport	Aizawl	Mizoram	AJL	3,543	3,510	0.9

Source: Airports Authority of India

=== 2016-17 ===
Aircraft movement for FY 2016–17
Rank	Name	City	State/UT	IATA code	Aircraft movement 2016-17	Aircraft movement 2015-16	% change
1	Indira Gandhi International Airport	Delhi	National Capital Region	DEL	397,799	344,113	15.6
2	Chhatrapati Shivaji Maharaj International Airport	Mumbai	Maharashtra	BOM	314,928	296,634	3.0
3	Kempegowda International Airport	Bangalore	Karnataka	BLR	177,271	153,063	15.8
4	Chennai International Airport	Chennai	Tamilnadu	MAA	176,767	146,122	18.1
5	Rajiv Gandhi International Airport	Hyderabad	Telangana	HYD	130,713	105,772	23.6
6	Netaji Subhas Chandra Bose International Airport	Kolkata	West Bengal	CCU	124,154	104,363	19.0
7	Cochin International Airport	Kochi	Kerala	COK	61,688	56,180	9.8
8	Sardar Vallabhbhai Patel International Airport	Ahmedabad	Gujarat	AMD	51,107	47,195	8.3
9	Dabolim Airport	Goa	Goa	GOI	47,801	39,030	22.5
10	Pune International Airport	Pune	Maharashtra	PNQ	46,932	40,726	15.2
11	Lokpriya Gopinath Bordoloi International Airport	Guwahati	Assam	GAU	37,873	29,425	28.7
12	Jaipur International Airport	Jaipur	Rajasthan	JAI	32,340	24,032	34.6
13	Chaudhary Charan Singh International Airport	Lucknow	Uttar Pradesh	LKO	29,356	27,317	7.5
14	Trivandrum International Airport	Thiruvananthapuram	Kerala	TRV	29,117	26,001	12.0
15	Juhu Aerodrome	Mumbai	Maharashtra	N/A	22,980	23,215	1.0
16	Coimbatore International Airport	Coimbatore	Tamil Nadu	CJB	20,722	17,935	15.5
17	Calicut International Airport	Kozhikode	Kerala	CCJ	19,726	17,260	14.3
18	Visakhapatnam Airport	Visakhapatnam	Andhra Pradesh	VTZ	19,550	16,739	16.8
19	Biju Patnaik International Airport	Bhubaneshwar	Odisha	BBI	17,078	14,036	21.7
20	Dr. Babasaheb Ambedkar International Airport	Nagpur	Maharashtra	NAG	16,062	13,416	19.7
21	Srinagar International Airport	Srinagar	Jammu and Kashmir	SXR	15,543	16,268	4.5
22	Jay Prakash Narayan International Airport	Patna	Bihar	PAT	15,508	13,947	11.2
23	Mangalore International Airport	Mangalore	Karnataka	IXE	15,405	13,805	11.6
24	Chandigarh International Airport	Chandigarh	Chandigarh	IXC	15254	13,130	16.2
25	Lal Bahadur Shastri International Airport	Varanasi	Uttar Pradesh	VNS	15,035	11,664	28.9
26	Devi Ahilyabai Holkar Airport	Indore	Madhya Pradesh	IDR	14,396	14,858	3.1
27	Veer Savarkar International Airport	Port Blair	Andaman and Nicobar	IXZ	12,524	10,138	23.5
28	Madurai International Airport	Madurai	Tamil Nadu	IXM	11,671	9,589	21.7
29	Sri Guru Ram Dass Jee International Airport	Amritsar	Punjab	ATQ	11,606	9,695	19.7
30	Bagdogra Airport	Bagdogra	West Bengal	IXB	11,599	8,839	31.2
31	Swami Vivekananda Airport	Raipur	Chhattisgarh	RPR	11,280	10,185	10.8
32	Tiruchirappalli International Airport	Tiruchirapalli	Tamil Nadu	TRZ	11,165	10,430	7.0
33	Jammu Airport	Jammu	Jammu and Kashmir	IXJ	10,852	10,766	0.8
34	Vijayawada Airport	Vijayawada	Andhra Pradesh	VGA	10,333	6,676	54.8
35	Jolly Grant Airport	Dehradun	Uttarakhand	DED	9,485	4,962	91.2
36	Maharana Pratap Airport	Udaipur	Rajasthan	UDR	9,084	7,462	21.7
37	Birsa Munda Airport	Ranchi	Jharkhand	IXR	9,051	6,592	37.3
38	Agartala Airport	Agartala	Tripura	IXA	8,899	7,158	24.3
39	Vadodara Airport	Vadodara	Gujarat	BDQ	8,330	7,339	13.5
40	Rajahmundry Airport	Rajahmundry	Andhra Pradesh	RJA	7,846	6,641	18.1
41	Raja Bhoj International Airport	Bhopal	Madhya Pradesh	BHO	6,949	7,755	10.4
42	Tirupati Airport	Tirupati	Andhra Pradesh	TIR	6,612	5,264	25.6
43	Imphal Airport	Imphal	Manipur	IMF	6,598	6,078	8.6
44	Leh Kushok Bakula Rimpochee Airport	Leh	Ladakh	IXL	4,904	3,434	42.8
45	Surat International Airport	Surat	Gujarat	STV	12,246	4,198	102
46	Rajkot Airport	Rajkot	Gujarat	RAJ	4,610	4,674	1.4
47	Aurangabad Airport	Aurangabad	Maharashtra	IXU	3,799	3,713	2.3
48	Jodhpur Airport	Jodhpur	Rajasthan	JDH	3,732	2,976	25.4
49	Lengpui Airport	Aizawl	Mizoram	AJL	3,510	2,839	23.6
50	Silchar Airport	Silchar	Assam	IXS	3,205	3,586	10.6

Source: Airports Authority of India

=== 2015-16 ===
Aircraft movement for FY 2015–16
Rank	Name	City	State/UT	IATA code	Aircraft movement 2015-16	Aircraft movement 2014-15	% change
1	Indira Gandhi International Airport	Delhi	Delhi	DEL	344,113	300,889	14.4
2	Chhatrapati Shivaji Maharaj International Airport	Mumbai	Maharashtra	BOM	296,634	269,456	10.1
3	Kempegowda International Airport	Bangalore	Karnataka	BLR	153,063	133,488	14.7
4	Chennai International Airport	Chennai	Tamil Nadu	MAA	125,122	97,128	2.2
5	Rajiv Gandhi International Airport	Hyderabad	Telangana	HYD	105,772	94,057	12.5
6	Netaji Subhash Chandra Bose International Airport	Kolkata	West Bengal	CCU	102,485	97,128	5.5
7	Cochin International Airport	Kochi	Kerala	COK	56,180	51,502	9.1
8	Sardar Vallabhbhai Patel International Airport	Ahmedabad	Gujarat	AMD	47,195	38,979	21.6
9	Pune International Airport	Pune	Maharashtra	PNQ	40,726	33,760	20.6
10	Dabolim Airport	Goa	Goa	GOI	39,030	33,422	16.8
11	Lokpriya Gopinath Bordoloi International Airport	Guwahati	Assam	GAU	29,425	26,871	9.5
12	Chaudhary Charan Singh International Airport	Lucknow	Uttar Pradesh	LKO	27,317	19,749	38.3
13	Thiruvananthapuram International Airport	Thiruvananthapuram	Kerala	TRV	26,001	23,719	9.6
14	Jaipur International Airport	Jaipur	Rajasthan	JAI	24,034	19,852	21.1
15	Juhu Aerodrome	Mumbai	Maharashtra	N/A	23,215	22,251	4.3
16	Coimbatore International Airport	Coimbatore	Tamil Nadu	CJB	17,935	17,691	1.4
17	Kozhikode International Airport	Kozhikode	Kerala	CCJ	17,260	17,481	1.3
18	Visakhapatnam Airport	Visakhapatnam	Andhra Pradesh	VTZ	16,739	11,445	46.3
19	Srinagar Airport	Srinagar	Jammu and Kashmir	SXR	16,268	14,828	9.7
20	Devi Ahilyabai Holkar Airport	Indore	Madhya Pradesh	IDR	14,858	14,371	3.4
21	Biju Patnaik International Airport	Bhubaneswar	Odisha	BBI	14,036	12,512	12.2
22	Lok Nayak Jayaprakash Airport	Patna	Bihar	PAT	13,947	11,060	26.1
23	Mangalore International Airport	Mangalore	Karnataka	IXE	13,805	11,501	20.0
24	Dr. Babasaheb Ambedkar International Airport	Nagpur	Maharashtra	NAG	13,416	14,042	4.5
25	Chandigarh International Airport	Chandigarh	Chandigarh	IXC	13,130	10,968	19.7
26	Lal Bahadur Shastri International Airport	Varanasi	Uttar Pradesh	VNS	11,666	8,801	32.6
27	Jammu Airport	Jammu	Jammu and Kashmir	IXJ	10,766	10,065	7.0
28	Tiruchirappalli International Airport	Tiruchirappalli	Tamil Nadu	TRZ	10,430	9,694	7.6
29	Swami Vivekananda Airport	Raipur	Chhattisgarh	RPR	10,185	8,425	20.9
30	Veer Savarkar International Airport	Port Blair	Andaman and Nicobar	IXZ	10,138	9,642	5.1
31	Sri Guru Ram Dass Jee International Airport	Amritsar	Punjab	ATQ	9,695	9,330	3.9
32	Madurai International Airport	Madurai	Tamil Nadu	IXM	9,589	7,728	24.1
33	Bagdogra Airport	Bagdogra	West Bengal	IXB	8,839	10,125	12.7
34	Raja Bhoj International Airport	Bhopal	Madhya Pradesh	BHO	7,755	5,375	44.3
35	Maharana Pratap Airport	Udaipur	Rajasthan	UDR	7,462	5,647	32.1
36	Vadodara Airport	Vadodara	Gujarat	BDQ	7,339	5,634	30.3
37	Agartala Airport	Agartala	Tripura	IXA	7,158	7,612	6.0
38	Vijayawada Airport	Vijayawada	Andhra Pradesh	VGA	6,676	4,639	43.9
39	Rajahmundry Airport	Rajahmundry	Andhra Pradesh	RJA	6,641	7,101	6.5
40	Birsa Munda Airport	Ranchi	Jharkhand	IXR	6,592	7,642	13.7
41	Imphal Airport	Imphal	Manipur	IMF	6,078	4,803	26.5
42	Tirupati Airport	Tirupati	Andhra Pradesh	TIR	5,264	2,985	76.3
43	Jolly Grant Airport	Dehradun	Uttrakhand	DED	4,962	4,840	2.5
44	Rajkot Airport	Rajkot	Gujarat	RAJ	4,674	3344	39.8
45	Aurangabad Airport	Aurangabad	Maharashtra	IXU	3,713	4,141	10.3
46	Silchar Airport	Silchar	Assam	IXS	3,586	3,110	15.3
47	Leh Kushok Bakula Rimpochee Airport	Leh	Ladakh	IXL	3,434	3,462	0.8
48	Dibrugarh Airport	Dibrugarh	Assam	DIB	3,213	3,992	19.5
49	Jodhpur Airport	Jodhpur	Rajasthan	JDH	2,976	3,058	2.7
50	Lengpui Airport	Aizawl	Mizoram	AJL	2,839	2,899	2.1

Source: Airports Authority of India

== Cargo handled ==
=== 2023-24 ===
Cargo handled for FY 2023–24
Rank	Name	City	State/UT	IATA code	Cargo tonnes 2023-24	Cargo tonnes 2022-23	% change
1	Indira Gandhi International Airport	Delhi	Delhi	DEL	1,003,306	895,918	▲12
2	Chhatrapati Shivaji Maharaj International Airport	Mumbai	Maharashtra	BOM	822,963	776,934	▲5.9
3	Kempegowda International Airport	Bangalore	Karnataka	BLR	439,495	410,311	▲7.1
4	Chennai International Airport	Chennai	Tamil Nadu	MAA	340,544	342,737	▼0.6
5	Netaji Subhas Chandra Bose International Airport	Kolkata	West Bengal	CCU	151,626	136,022	▲11.5
6	Rajiv Gandhi International Airport	Hyderabad	Telangana	HYD	149,812	142,434	▲5.2
7	Sardar Vallabhbhai Patel International Airport	Ahmedabad	Gujarat	AMD	106,906	92,337	▲15.8
8	Cochin International Airport	Kochi	Kerala	COK	59,974	56,773	▲5.6
9	Pune International Airport	Pune	Maharashtra	PNQ	37,841	39,369	▼3.9
10	Chaudhary Charan Singh International Airport	Lucknow	Uttar Pradesh	LKO	20,984	15,840	▲32.5
11	Jaipur International Airport	Jaipur	Rajasthan	JAI	16,441	19,420	▲18.1
12	Lokpriya Gopinath Bordoloi International Airport	Guwahati	Assam	GAU	18,851	22,823	▼17.4
13	Trivandrum International Airport	Thiruvananthapuram	Kerala	TRV	18,392	16,722	▲10
14	Calicut International Airport	Kozhikode	Kerala	CCJ	18,264	14,523	▲25.8
15	Devi Ahilyabai Holkar Airport	Indore	Madhya Pradesh	IDR	10,189	10,634	▼4.2
16	Biju Patnaik International Airport	Bhubaneshwar	Odisha	BBI	9,887	9,822	▲0.7
17	Jay Prakash Narayan Airport	Patna	Bihar	PAT	9,165	11,571	▼20.8
18	Srinagar International Airport	Srinagar	Jammu and Kashmir	SXR	9,196	9,126	▼0.8
19	Coimbatore International Airport	Coimbatore	Tamil Nadu	CJB	8,922	8,381	▲6.4
20	Bagdogra Airport	Siliguri	West Bengal	IXB	8,445	8,997	▼6.1
21	Chandigarh Airport	Chandigarh	Chandigarh	IXC	8,303	9,366	▼11.3
22	Dr. Babasaheb Ambedkar International Airport	Nagpur	Maharashtra	NAG	7,994	9,189	▼13
23	Tiruchirappalli International Airport	Tiruchirapalli	Tamil Nadu	TRZ	6,593	6,357	▲3.7
24	Veer Savarkar International Airport	Port Blair	Andaman and Nicobar	IXZ	6,246	6,358	▼1.8
25	Dabolim Airport	Goa	Goa	GOI	6,098	6,452	▼5.5
26	Birsa Munda Airport	Ranchi	Jharkhand	IXR	5,945	6,516	▼8.8
27	Surat International Airport	Surat	Gujarat	STV	5,930	4,985	▲19
28	Swami Vivekananda Airport	Raipur	Chhattisgarh	RPR	4,967	5,660	▼12.3
29	Lal Bahadur Shastri Airport	Varanasi	Uttar Pradesh	VNS	4,721	4,729	▼0.2
30	Imphal Airport	Imphal	Manipur	IMF	4,478	7,646	▼41.4
31	Visakhapatnam International Airport	Visakhapatnam	Andhra Pradesh	VTZ	4,032	4,434	▼9.1
32	Sri Guru Ram Dass Jee International Airport	Amritsar	Punjab	ATQ	3,358	2,239	▲50
33	Kannur International Airport	Kannur	Kerala	CNN	3,306	3,912	▼15.5
34	Madurai International Airport	Madurai	Tamil Nadu	IXM	3,292	2,872	▲14.6
35	Agartala Airport	Agartala	Tripura	IXA	3,024	4,118	▼26.6
36	Raja Bhoj Airport	Bhopal	Madhya Pradesh	BHO	2,589	3,048	▼15.1
37	Vadodara Airport	Vadodara	Gujarat	BDQ	2,543	2,300	▲10.6
38	Mangalore Airport	Mangalore	Karnataka	IXE	2,175	3,815	▼43
39	Jolly Grant Airport	Dehradun	Uttarakhand	DED	1,994	1,531	▲30.2
40	Leh Kushok Bakula Rimpochee Airport	Leh	Ladakh	IXL	1,731	1,938	▼10.7
41	Dimapur Airport	Dimapur	Nagaland	DMU	1,675	1,148	▲45.9
42	Manohar International Airport	Goa	Goa	GOX	1,623	12	▲13425
43	Lengpui Airport	Aizawl	Mizoram	AJL	883	471	▲87.4
44	Jammu Airport	Jammu	Jammu and Kashmir	IXJ	876	1,462	▼40.1
45	Vijayawada International Airport	Vijayawada	Andhra Pradesh	VGA	810	1,275	▼36.5
46	Aurangabad Airport	Aurangabad	Maharashtra	IXU	725	1,139	▼36.4
47	Silchar Airport	Silchar	Assam	IXS	525	742	▼29.2
48	Kazi Nazrul Islam Airport	Durgapur	West Bengal	RDP	491	483	▲1.8
49	Nashik Airport	Nashik	Maharashtra	ISK	464	0	
50	Darbhanga Airport	Darbhanga	Bihar	DBR	418	271	▲54.3

Source: Airports Authority of India

=== 2022-23 ===
Cargo handled for FY 2022–23
Rank	Name	City	State/UT	IATA code	Cargo tonnes 2022-23	Cargo tonnes 2021-22	% change
1	Indira Gandhi International Airport	Delhi	Delhi	DEL	895,918	924,343	▼-3.1
2	Chhatrapati Shivaji Maharaj International Airport	Mumbai	Maharashtra	BOM	776,934	770,953	▲0.8
3	Kempegowda International Airport	Bangalore	Karnataka	BLR	410,311	411,550	▼-0.3
4	Chennai International Airport	Chennai	Tamil Nadu	MAA	342,737	349,964	▼-2.1
5	Rajiv Gandhi International Airport	Hyderabad	Telangana	HYD	142,434	140,075	▲1.7
6	Netaji Subhas Chandra Bose International Airport	Kolkata	West Bengal	CCU	136,022	138,127	▼-1.5
7	Sardar Vallabhbhai Patel International Airport	Ahmedabad	Gujarat	AMD	92,337	90,634	▲1.9
8	Cochin International Airport	Kochi	Kerala	COK	56,773	55,484	▲2.3
9	Pune International Airport	Pune	Maharashtra	PNQ	39,369	28,702	▲37.2
10	Lokpriya Gopinath Bordoloi International Airport	Guwahati	Assam	GAU	22,823	21,858	▲4.4
11	Trivandrum International Airport	Thiruvananthapuram	Kerala	TRV	16,722	16,579	▲0.9
12	Jaipur International Airport	Jaipur	Rajasthan	JAI	16,441	14,180	▲15.9
13	Chaudhary Charan Singh International Airport	Lucknow	Uttar Pradesh	LKO	15,840	14,942	▲6
14	Calicut International Airport	Kozhikode	Kerala	CCJ	14,523	10,544	▲37.7
15	Dabolim Airport	Goa	Goa	GOI	11,800	0	
16	Jay Prakash Narayan Airport	Patna	Bihar	PAT	11,571	12,409	▼-6.8
17	Devi Ahilyabai Holkar Airport	Indore	Madhya Pradesh	IDR	10,634	8,797	▲20.9
18	Biju Patnaik International Airport	Bhubaneshwar	Odisha	BBI	9,822	10,504	▼-6.5
19	Chandigarh Airport	Chandigarh	Chandigarh	IXC	9,366	11,085	▼-15.5
20	Srinagar International Airport	Srinagar	Jammu and Kashmir	SXR	9,196	9,422	▼-2.4
21	Dr. Babasaheb Ambedkar International Airport	Nagpur	Maharashtra	NAG	9,189	7,686	▲19.6
22	Bagdogra Airport	Siliguri	West Bengal	IXB	8,997	8,780	▲2.5
23	Coimbatore International Airport	Coimbatore	Tamil Nadu	CJB	8,381	7,552	▲11
24	Imphal Airport	Imphal	Manipur	IMF	7,646	7,195	▲6.3
25	Birsa Munda Airport	Ranchi	Jharkhand	IXR	6,516	5,608	▲16.2
26	Dabolim Airport	Goa	Goa	GOI	6,452	5,127	▲25.8
27	Veer Savarkar International Airport	Port Blair	Andaman and Nicobar	IXZ	6,358	5,837	▲8.9
28	Tiruchirappalli International Airport	Tiruchirapalli	Tamil Nadu	TRZ	6,357	5,217	▲21.9
29	Swami Vivekananda Airport	Raipur	Chhattisgarh	RPR	5,660	6,024	▼-6
30	Surat International Airport	Surat	Gujarat	STV	4,985	5,075	▼-1.8
31	Lal Bahadur Shastri Airport	Varanasi	Uttar Pradesh	VNS	4,729	4,345	▲8.8
32	Visakhapatnam International Airport	Visakhapatnam	Andhra Pradesh	VTZ	4,434	4,326	▲2.5
33	Agartala Airport	Agartala	Tripura	IXA	4,118	3,505	▲17.5
34	Kannur International Airport	Kannur	Kerala	CNN	3,912	1,559	▲150.9
35	Mangalore Airport	Mangalore	Karnataka	IXE	3,815	3,521	▲8.3
36	Raja Bhoj Airport	Bhopal	Madhya Pradesh	BHO	3,048	2,113	▲44.2
37	Madurai International Airport	Madurai	Tamil Nadu	IXM	2,872	1,596	▲79.9
38	Vadodara Airport	Vadodara	Gujarat	BDQ	2,300	1,212	▲89.8
39	Sri Guru Ram Dass Jee International Airport	Amritsar	Punjab	ATQ	2,239	1,578	▲41.9
40	Leh Kushok Bakula Rimpochee Airport	Leh	Ladakh	IXL	1,938	2,976	▼-34.9
41	Jolly Grant Airport	Dehradun	Uttarakhand	DED	1,531	6,655	▲133.7
42	Jammu Airport	Jammu	Jammu and Kashmir	IXJ	1,462	1,483	▼-1.4
43	Dibrugarh Airport	Dibrugarh	Assam	DIB	1,303	1,014	▲28.5
44	Vijayawada International Airport	Vijayawada	Andhra Pradesh	VGA	1,275	2,264	▼-43.7
45	Dimapur Airport	Dimapur	Nagaland	DMU	1,148	1,054	▲8.9
46	Aurangabad Airport	Aurangabad	Maharashtra	IXU	1,139	841	▲35.4
47	Rajkot Airport	Rajkot	Gujarat	RAJ	890	255	▲249
48	Silchar Airport	Silchar	Assam	IXS	742	828	▼-10.4
49	Shirdi Airport	Shirdi	Maharashtra	SAG	643	38	▲1592.1
50	Kazi Nazrul Islam Airport	Durgapur	West Bengal	RDP	483	17	▲2741.2

Source: Airports Authority of India

=== 2021-22 ===
Cargo handled for FY 2021–22
Rank	Name	City	State/UT	IATA code	Cargo tonnes 2021-22	Cargo tonnes 2020-21	% change
1	Indira Gandhi International Airport	Delhi	Delhi	DEL	924,343	737,431	▲25.3
2	Chhatrapati Shivaji Maharaj International Airport	Mumbai	Maharashtra	BOM	770,953	592,966	▲30
3	Kempegowda International Airport	Bangalore	Karnataka	BLR	411,550	326,672	▲26
4	Netaji Subhas Chandra Bose International Airport	Kolkata	West Bengal	CCU	349,964	290,093	▲20.6
5	Rajiv Gandhi International Airport	Hyderabad	Telangana	HYD	140,075	110,789	▲26.4
6	Chennai International Airport	Chennai	Tamil Nadu	MAA	138,127	104,953	▲31.6
7	Sardar Vallabhbhai Patel International Airport	Ahmedabad	Gujarat	AMD	90,634	60,749	▲49.2
8	Cochin International Airport	Kochi	Kerala	COK	55,484	42,776	▲29.7
9	Pune International Airport	Pune	Maharashtra	PNQ	28,702	26,419	▲8.6
10	Lokpriya Gopinath Bordoloi International Airport	Guwahati	Assam	GAU	21,858	15,951	▲37
11	Trivandrum International Airport	Thiruvananthapuram	Kerala	TRV	16,579	14,799	▲12
12	Chaudhary Charan Singh International Airport	Lucknow	Uttar Pradesh	LKO	14,942	9,968	▲49.9
13	Jaipur International Airport	Jaipur	Rajasthan	JAI	14,180	12,204	▲16.2
14	Jay Prakash Narayan Airport	Patna	Bihar	PAT	12,409	11,859	▲4.6
15	Chandigarh Airport	Chandigarh	Chandigarh	IXC	11,085	8,069	▲37.4
16	Calicut International Airport	Kozhikode	Kerala	CCJ	10,544	9,295	▲13.4
17	Biju Patnaik International Airport	Bhubaneshwar	Odisha	BBI	10,504	7,398	▲42
18	Srinagar International Airport	Srinagar	Jammu and Kashmir	SXR	9,422	6,572	▲43.4
19	Devi Ahilyabai Holkar Airport	Indore	Madhya Pradesh	IDR	8,797	8,054	▲9.2
20	Bagdogra Airport	Siliguri	West Bengal	IXB	8,780	6,024	▲45.8
21	Dr. Babasaheb Ambedkar International Airport	Nagpur	Maharashtra	NAG	7,686	6,726	▲14.3
22	Coimbatore International Airport	Coimbatore	Tamil Nadu	CJB	7,552	5,997	▲25.9
23	Imphal Airport	Imphal	Manipur	IMF	7,195	4,838	▲48.7
24	Swami Vivekananda Airport	Raipur	Chhattisgarh	RPR	6,024	4,948	▲21.7
25	Veer Savarkar International Airport	Port Blair	Andaman and Nicobar	IXZ	5,837	4,094	▲42.6
26	Birsa Munda Airport	Ranchi	Jharkhand	IXR	5,608	5,654	▼-0.8
27	Tiruchirappalli International Airport	Tiruchirapalli	Tamil Nadu	TRZ	5,217	2,740	▲90.4
28	Dabolim Airport	Goa	Goa	GOI	5,127	3,965	▲29.3
29	Surat International Airport	Surat	Gujarat	STV	5,075	4,967	▲2.2
30	Lal Bahadur Shastri Airport	Varanasi	Uttar Pradesh	VNS	4,345	2,952	▲47.2
31	Visakhapatnam International Airport	Visakhapatnam	Andhra Pradesh	VTZ	4,326	3,778	▲14.5
32	Mangalore Airport	Mangalore	Karnataka	IXE	3,521	2,186	▲61.1
33	Agartala Airport	Agartala	Tripura	IXA	3,505	2,002	▲75.1
34	Leh Kushok Bakula Rimpochee Airport	Leh	Ladakh	IXL	2,976	2,370	▲25.6
35	Vijayawada International Airport	Vijayawada	Andhra Pradesh	VGA	2,264	1,989	▲13.8
36	Raja Bhoj Airport	Bhopal	Madhya Pradesh	BHO	2,113	1,454	▲45.3
37	Madurai International Airport	Madurai	Tamil Nadu	IXM	1,596	2,134	▼-25.2
38	Sri Guru Ram Dass Jee International Airport	Amritsar	Punjab	ATQ	1,578	1,253	▲25.9
39	Kannur International Airport	Kannur	Kerala	CNN	15,559	0	▲NA
40	Jammu Airport	Jammu	Jammu and Kashmir	IXJ	14,483	93,936	▲58.4
41	Vadodara Airport	Vadodara	Gujarat	BDQ	1,212	2,494	▼-51.4
42	Dimapur Airport	Dimapur	Nagaland	DMU	1,054	255	▲313.3
43	Dibrugarh Airport	Dibrugarh	Assam	DIB	1,014	738	▲37.4
44	Aurangabad Airport	Aurangabad	Maharashtra	IXU	841	776	▲8.4
45	Silchar Airport	Silchar	Assam	IXS	828	601	▲37.8
46	Jolly Grant Airport	Dehradun	Uttarakhand	DED	655	62	▲956.5
47	Lengpui Airport	Aizawl	Mizoram	AJL	319	364	▼-12.4
48	Juhu Aerodrome	Mumbai	Maharashtra		257	145	▲77.2
49	Rajkot Airport	Rajkot	Gujarat	RAJ	255	73	▲249.3
50	Kanpur Airport	Kanpur	Uttar Pradesh	KNU	200	123	▲62.6

Source: Airports Authority of India

=== 2020-21 ===
Cargo handled for FY 2020–21
Rank	Name	City	State/UT	IATA code	Cargo tonnes 2020-21	Cargo tonnes 2019-20	% change
1	Indira Gandhi International Airport	Delhi	Delhi	DEL	737,431	955,858	▼-22.9
2	Chhatrapati Shivaji Maharaj International Airport	Mumbai	Maharashtra	BOM	592,966	863,782	▼-31.4
3	Kempegowda International Airport	Bangalore	Karnataka	BLR	326,672	374,062	▼-12.7
4	Netaji Subhas Chandra Bose International Airport	Kolkata	West Bengal	CCU	290,093	355,194	▼-18.3
5	Rajiv Gandhi International Airport	Hyderabad	Telangana	HYD	110,789	143,884	▼-23
6	Chennai International Airport	Chennai	Tamil Nadu	MAA	104,953	153,468	▼-31.6
7	Sardar Vallabhbhai Patel International Airport	Ahmedabad	Gujarat	AMD	60,749	103,741	▼-41.4
8	Cochin International Airport	Kochi	Kerala	COK	42,776	72,142	▼-40.7
9	Pune International Airport	Pune	Maharashtra	PNQ	26,419	37,986	▼-30.5
10	Lokpriya Gopinath Bordoloi International Airport	Guwahati	Assam	GAU	15,951	21,270	▼-25
11	Trivandrum International Airport	Thiruvananthapuram	Kerala	TRV	14,799	25,511	▼-42
12	Jaipur International Airport	Jaipur	Rajasthan	JAI	12,204	1,499	▼-30.3
13	Jay Prakash Narayan Airport	Patna	Bihar	PAT	11,859	12,249	▼-3.2
14	Chaudhary Charan Singh International Airport	Lucknow	Uttar Pradesh	LKO	9,968	14,882	▼-33
15	Calicut International Airport	Kozhikode	Kerala	CCJ	9,295	28,179	▼-67
16	Chandigarh Airport	Chandigarh	Chandigarh	IXC	8,069	8,939	▼-9.7
17	Devi Ahilyabai Holkar Airport	Indore	Madhya Pradesh	IDR	8,054	10,770	▼-25.2
18	Biju Patnaik International Airport	Bhubaneshwar	Odisha	BBI	7,398	10,011	▼-26.1
19	Dr. Babasaheb Ambedkar International Airport	Nagpur	Maharashtra	NAG	6,726	9,586	▼-29.8
20	Srinagar International Airport	Srinagar	Jammu and Kashmir	SXR	6,572	6,912	▼-4.9
21	Bagdogra Airport	Siliguri	West Bengal	IXB	6,024	7,508	▼-19.8
22	Coimbatore International Airport	Coimbatore	Tamil Nadu	CJB	5,997	12,355	▼-51.5
23	Birsa Munda Airport	Ranchi	Jharkhand	IXR	5,654	5,869	▼-3.7
24	Surat International Airport	Surat	Gujarat	STV	4,967	3,975	▲25
25	Swami Vivekananda Airport	Raipur	Chhattisgarh	RPR	4,948	6,306	▼-21.5
26	Imphal Airport	Imphal	Manipur	IMF	4,838	7,860	▼-38.4
27	Veer Savarkar International Airport	Port Blair	Andaman and Nicobar	IXZ	4,094	6,305	▼-35.1
28	Dabolim Airport	Goa	Goa	GOI	3,965	5,420	▼-26.8
29	Visakhapatnam International Airport	Visakhapatnam	Andhra Pradesh	VTZ	3,778	5,536	▼-31.8
30	Lal Bahadur Shastri Airport	Varanasi	Uttar Pradesh	VNS	2,952	3,580	▼-17.5
31	Tiruchirappalli International Airport	Tiruchirapalli	Tamil Nadu	TRZ	2,740	8,114	▼-66.2
32	Vadodara Airport	Vadodara	Gujarat	BDQ	2,494	3,597	▼-30.7
33	Leh Kushok Bakula Rimpochee Airport	Leh	Ladakh	IXL	2,370	1,925	▲23.1
34	Mangalore Airport	Mangalore	Karnataka	IXE	2,186	4,605	▼-52.5
35	Madurai International Airport	Madurai	Tamil Nadu	IXM	2,134	3,356	▼-36.4
36	Agartala Airport	Agartala	Tripura	IXA	2,002	4,661	▼-57
37	Vijayawada International Airport	Vijayawada	Andhra Pradesh	VGA	1,989	2,129	▼-6.6
38	Raja Bhoj Airport	Bhopal	Madhya Pradesh	BHO	1,454	1,526	▼-4.7
39	Sri Guru Ram Dass Jee International Airport	Amritsar	Punjab	ATQ	1,253	2,180	▼42.5
40	Jammu Airport	Jammu	Jammu and Kashmir	IXJ	936	1,385	▼-32.4
41	Aurangabad Airport	Aurangabad	Maharashtra	IXU	776	981	▼-20.9
42	Dibrugarh Airport	Dibrugarh	Assam	DIB	738	909	▼-18.8
43	Silchar Airport	Silchar	Assam	IXS	601	794	▼-24.3
44	Lengpui Airport	Aizawl	Mizoram	AJL	364	413	▼-11.9
45	Dimapur Airport	Dimapur	Nagaland	DMU	255	372	▼-31.5
46	Juhu Aerodrome	Mumbai	Maharashtra	0	145	362	▼-59.9
47	Kanpur Airport	Kanpur	Uttar Pradesh	KNU	123	153	▼-19.6
48	Rajkot Airport	Rajkot	Gujarat	RAJ	73	35	▲108.6
49	Hubli Airport	Hubli	Karnataka	HBX	67	106	▼-36.8
50	Jolly Grant Airport	Dehradun	Uttarakhand	DED	62	174	▼-64.4

Source: Airports Authority of India

=== 2019-20 ===
Cargo handled for FY 2019–20
Rank	Name	City	State/UT	IATA code	Cargo tonnes 2019-20	Cargo tonnes 2018-19	% change
1	Indira Gandhi International Airport	Delhi	Delhi	DEL	955,858	1,104,948	▼-8.4
2	Chhatrapati Shivaji Maharaj International Airport	Mumbai	Maharashtra	BOM	863,782	963,460	▼-10.3
3	Kempegowda International Airport	Bangalore	Karnataka	BLR	374,062	386,849	▼-3.3
4	Netaji Subhas Chandra Bose International Airport	Kolkata	West Bengal	CCU	355,194	411,613	▼-13.7
5	Chennai International Airport	Chennai	Tamil Nadu	MAA	153,468	155,232	▼-1.1
6	Rajiv Gandhi International Airport	Hyderabad	Telangana	HYD	143,884	144,126	▼-0.2
7	Sardar Vallabhbhai Patel International Airport	Ahmedabad	Gujarat	AMD	103,741	101,731	▲2
8	Cochin International Airport	Kochi	Kerala	COK	72,142	70,199	▲2.8
9	Pune International Airport	Pune	Maharashtra	PNQ	37,986	47,392	▼-19.8
10	Calicut International Airport	Kozhikode	Kerala	CCJ	28,179	17,283	▲63
11	Trivandrum International Airport	Thiruvananthapuram	Kerala	TRV	25,511	25,167	▲1.4
12	Lokpriya Gopinath Bordoloi International Airport	Guwahati	Assam	GAU	21,270	23,840	▼-10.8
13	Jaipur International Airport	Jaipur	Rajasthan	JAI	17,499	18,513	▼-5.5
14	Chaudhary Charan Singh International Airport	Lucknow	Uttar Pradesh	LKO	14,882	6,111	▲143.5
15	Coimbatore International Airport	Coimbatore	Tamil Nadu	CJB	12,355	12,865	▼-4
16	Jay Prakash Narayan Airport	Patna	Bihar	PAT	12,249	11,435	▲7.1
17	Devi Ahilyabai Holkar Airport	Indore	Madhya Pradesh	IDR	10,770	11,729	▼-8.2
18	Biju Patnaik International Airport	Bhubaneshwar	Odisha	BBI	10,011	9,670	▲3.5
19	Dr. Babasaheb Ambedkar International Airport	Nagpur	Maharashtra	NAG	9,586	9,416	▲1.8
20	Chandigarh Airport	Chandigarh	Chandigarh	IXC	8,939	5,051	▲77
21	Tiruchirappalli International Airport	Tiruchirapalli	Tamil Nadu	TRZ	8,114	6,950	▲16.7
22	Imphal Airport	Imphal	Manipur	IMF	7,860	6,313	▲24.5
23	Bagdogra Airport	Siliguri	West Bengal	IXB	7,508	6,478	▲15.9
24	Srinagar International Airport	Srinagar	Jammu and Kashmir	SXR	6,912	7,990	▼-13.5
25	Swami Vivekananda Airport	Raipur	Chhattisgarh	RPR	6,306	5,003	▲26
26	Veer Savarkar International Airport	Port Blair	Andaman and Nicobar	IXZ	5,972	6,158	▼-3
27	Birsa Munda Airport	Ranchi	Jharkhand	IXR	5,869	5,274	▲11.3
28	Visakhapatnam International Airport	Visakhapatnam	Andhra Pradesh	VTZ	5,536	5,395	▲2.6
29	Dabolim Airport	Goa	Goa	GOI	5,420	4,536	▲19.5
30	Agartala Airport	Agartala	Tripura	IXA	4,661	5,195	▼-10.3
31	Mangalore Airport	Mangalore	Karnataka	IXE	4,605	3,287	▲40.1
32	Surat International Airport	Surat	Gujarat	STV	3,975	1,041	▲281.8
33	Vadodara Airport	Vadodara	Gujarat	BDQ	3,597	2,898	▲24.1
34	Lal Bahadur Shastri Airport	Varanasi	Uttar Pradesh	VNS	3,580	2,657	▲34.7
35	Madurai International Airport	Madurai	Tamil Nadu	IXM	3,356	4,934	▼-32
36	Sri Guru Ram Dass Jee International Airport	Amritsar	Punjab	ATQ	2,180	1,378	▲58.2
37	Vijayawada International Airport	Vijayawada	Andhra Pradesh	VGA	2,129	382	▲457.3
38	Leh Kushok Bakula Rimpochee Airport	Leh	Ladakh	IXL	1,925	1,695	▲13.6
39	Raja Bhoj Airport	Bhopal	Madhya Pradesh	BHO	1,526	1,746	▼-12.6
40	Jammu Airport	Jammu	Jammu and Kashmir	IXJ	1,385	1,976	▼-29.9
41	Aurangabad Airport	Aurangabad	Maharashtra	IXU	981	2,007	▼-51.1
42	Dibrugarh Airport	Dibrugarh	Assam	DIB	909	825	▲10.2
43	Silchar Airport	Silchar	Assam	IXS	794	895	▼-11.3
44	Lengpui Airport	Aizawl	Mizoram	AJL	413	525	▼-21.3
45	Dimapur Airport	Dimapur	Nagaland	DMU	372	467	▼-20.3
46	Juhu Aerodrome	Mumbai	Maharashtra		362	340	▲6.5
47	Jolly Grant Airport	Dehradun	Uttarakhand	DED	174	231	▼-24.7
48	Kanpur Airport	Kanpur	Uttar Pradesh	KNU	153	1	▲15200
49	Hubli Airport	Hubli	Karnataka	HBX	106	36	▲194.4
50	Agatti Airport	Agatti Island	Lakshadweep	AGX	76	29	▲162.1

Source: Airports Authority of India

=== 2018-19 ===
Cargo handled for FY 2018–19
Rank	Name	City	State/UT	IATA code	Cargo tonnes 2018-19	Cargo tonnes 2017-18	% change
1	Indira Gandhi International Airport	Delhi	Delhi	DEL	1,104,948	963,032	▲8.3
2	Chhatrapati Shivaji Maharaj International Airport	Mumbai	Maharashtra	BOM	963,460	906,321	▲6.3
3	Netaji Subhas Chandra Bose International Airport	Kolkata	West Bengal	CCU	411,613	417,787	▼-1.5
4	Kempegowda International Airport	Bangalore	Karnataka	BLR	386,849	348,403	▲11
5	Chennai International Airport	Chennai	Tamil Nadu	MAA	155,232	163,323	▼-5
6	Rajiv Gandhi International Airport	Hyderabad	Telangana	HYD	144,126	134,141	▲7.4
7	Sardar Vallabhbhai Patel International Airport	Ahmedabad	Gujarat	AMD	101,731	91,633	▲11
8	Cochin International Airport	Kochi	Kerala	COK	70,199	76,274	▼-8
9	Pune International Airport	Pune	Maharashtra	PNQ	47,392	41,566	▲14
10	Trivandrum International Airport	Thiruvananthapuram	Kerala	TRV	25,167	28,715	▼-12.4
11	Lokpriya Gopinath Bordoloi International Airport	Guwahati	Assam	GAU	23,840	22,345	▲6.7
12	Jaipur International Airport	Jaipur	Rajasthan	JAI	18,513	16,304	▲13.5
13	Calicut International Airport	Kozhikode	Kerala	CCJ	17,283	18,866	▼-8.4
14	Coimbatore International Airport	Coimbatore	Tamil Nadu	CJB	12,865	10,461	▲23
15	Devi Ahilyabai Holkar Airport	Indore	Madhya Pradesh	IDR	11,729	10,851	▲8.1
16	Jay Prakash Narayan Airport	Patna	Bihar	PAT	11,435	6,879	▲66.2
17	Biju Patnaik International Airport	Bhubaneshwar	Odisha	BBI	9,670	7,843	▲23.3
18	Dr. Babasaheb Ambedkar International Airport	Nagpur	Maharashtra	NAG	9,416	7,854	▲19.9
19	Srinagar International Airport	Srinagar	Jammu and Kashmir	SXR	7,990	7,226	▲10.6
20	Tiruchirappalli International Airport	Tiruchirapalli	Tamil Nadu	TRZ	6,950	6,541	▲6.3
21	Bagdogra Airport	Siliguri	West Bengal	IXB	6,478	4,986	▲29.9
22	Imphal Airport	Imphal	Manipur	IMF	6,313	4,306	▲46.6
23	Veer Savarkar International Airport	Port Blair	Andaman and Nicobar	IXZ	6,158	5,682	▲8.4
24	Chaudhary Charan Singh International Airport	Lucknow	Uttar Pradesh	LKO	6,111	6,329	▼-3.4
25	Birsa Munda Airport	Ranchi	Jharkhand	IXR	5,274	4,743	▲11.2
26	Agartala Airport	Agartala	Tripura	IXA	5,195	5,322	▼-2.4
27	Chandigarh Airport	Chandigarh	Chandigarh	IXC	5,051	5,650	▼-10.6
28	Swami Vivekananda Airport	Raipur	Chhattisgarh	RPR	5,003	4,093	▲22.2
29	Madurai International Airport	Madurai	Tamil Nadu	IXM	4,934	2,485	▲98.6
30	Dabolim Airport	Goa	Goa	GOI	4,536	4,372	▲3.8
31	Visakhapatnam International Airport	Visakhapatnam	Andhra Pradesh	VTZ	3,513	4,847	▼-27.5
32	Mangalore Airport	Mangalore	Karnataka	IXE	3,287	2,527	▲30.1
33	Vadodara Airport	Vadodara	Gujarat	BDQ	2,898	2,308	▲25.6
34	Lal Bahadur Shastri Airport	Varanasi	Uttar Pradesh	VNS	2,657	1,190	▲123.3
35	Aurangabad Airport	Aurangabad	Maharashtra	IXU	2,007	1,729	▲16.1
36	Jammu Airport	Jammu	Jammu and Kashmir	IXJ	1,976	1,813	▲9
37	Raja Bhoj Airport	Bhopal	Madhya Pradesh	BHO	1,746	1,153	▲51.4
38	Leh Kushok Bakula Rimpochee Airport	Leh	Ladakh	IXL	1,695	1,622	▲4.5
39	Sri Guru Ram Dass Jee International Airport	Amritsar	Punjab	ATQ	1,378	1,676	▼-17.8
40	Surat International Airport	Surat	Gujarat	STV	1,041	212	▲391
41	Silchar Airport	Silchar	Assam	IXS	895	522	▲71.5
42	Dibrugarh Airport	Dibrugarh	Assam	DIB	825	665	▲24.1
43	Lengpui Airport	Aizawl	Mizoram	AJL	525	746	▼-29.6
44	Dimapur Airport	Dimapur	Nagaland	DMU	467	567	▼-17.6
45	Vijayawada International Airport	Vijayawada	Andhra Pradesh	VGA	382	0	
46	Juhu Aerodrome	Mumbai	Maharashtra		340	382	▼-11
47	Nashik Airport	Nashik	Maharashtra	ISK	237	0	
48	Jolly Grant Airport	Dehradun	Uttarakhand	DED	231	219	▲5.5
49	Rajkot Airport	Rajkot	Gujarat	RAJ	223	289	▼-22.8
50	Rajahmundry Airport	Rajahmundry	Andhra Pradesh	RJA	51	24	▲112.5

Source: Airports Authority of India

=== 2017-18 ===
Cargo handled for FY 2017–18
Rank	Name	City	State/UT	IATA code	Cargo tonnes 2017-18	Cargo tonnes 2016-17	% change
1	Indira Gandhi International Airport	Delhi	Delhi	DEL	963,032	857,419	12.3
2	Chhatrapati Shivaji Maharaj International Airport	Mumbai	Maharashtra	BOM	906,321	782,289	15.9
3	Chennai International Airport	Chennai	Tamil Nadu	MAA	417,787	359,217	16.3
4	Kempegowda International Airport	Bangalore	Karnataka	BLR	348,403	319,344	9.1
5	Netaji Subhash Chandra Bose International Airport	Kolkata	West Bengal	CCU	163,323	152415	7.2
6	Rajiv Gandhi International Airport	Hyderabad	Telangana	HYD	134,141	121882	10.1
7	Sardar Vallabhbhai Patel International Airport	Ahmedabad	Gujarat	AMD	91,633	76,602	19.6
8	Cochin International Airport	Kochi	Kerala	COK	76,274	81,485	6.4
9	Pune International Airport	Pune	Maharashtra	PNQ	41,566	34,645	20.0
10	Trivandrum International Airport	Thiruvananthapuram	Kerala	TRV	28,715	28,450	0.9
11	Lokpriya Gopinath Bordoloi International Airport	Guwahati	Assam	GAU	22,345	17,286	29.3
12	Calicut International Airport	Kozhikode	Kerala	CCJ	18,866	14,023	34.5
13	Jaipur International Airport	Jaipur	Rajasthan	JAI	16,304	16,126	1.1
14	Devi Ahilyabai Holkar Airport	Indore	Madhya Pradesh	IDR	10,851	7,668	41.5
15	Coimbatore International Airport	Coimbatore	Tamil Nadu	CJB	10,461	10,139	3.2
16	Dr. Babasaheb Ambedkar International Airport	Nagpur	Maharashtra	NAG	7,854	7,145	9.9
17	Biju Patnaik International Airport	Bhubaneswar	Odisha	BBI	7,843	8,239	4.8
18	Srinagar Airport	Srinagar	Jammu and Kashmir	SXR	7,226	4,882	48.0
19	Jay Prakash Narayan International Airport	Patna	Bihar	PAT	6,879	6,591	4.4
20	Tiruchirappalli International Airport	Tiruchirappalli	Tamil Nadu	TRZ	6,541	6,867	4.7
21	Chaudhary Charan Singh International Airport	Lucknow	Uttar Pradesh	LKO	6,329	4,843	30.7
22	Veer Savarkar International Airport	Port Blair	Andaman and Nicobar	IXZ	5,682	4,655	22.1
23	Chandigarh International Airport	Chandigarh	Chandigarh	IXC	5,650	5,697	0.8
24	Agartala Airport	Agartala	Tripura	IXA	5,322	6,057	12.1
25	Bagdogra Airport	Siliguri	West Bengal	IXB	4,986	4,312	15.6
26	Visakhapatnam Airport	Visakhapatnam	Andhra Pradesh	VTZ	4,847	4,708	3.0
27	Birsa Munda Airport	Ranchi	Jharkhand	IXR	4,743	4,841	2.0
28	Dabolim Airport	Goa	Goa	GOI	4,372	4,103	6.6
29	Imphal Airport	Imphal	Manipur	IMF	4,306	4,720	8.8
30	Swami Vivekananda Airport	Raipur	Chhattisgarh	RPR	4,093	4,561	10.3
31	Mangalore International Airport	Mangalore	Karnataka	IXE	2,527	1,242	103.5
32	Madurai International Airport	Madurai	Tamil Nadu	IXM	2,485	1031	141.0
33	Vadodara Airport	Vadodara	Gujarat	BDQ	2,308	2,973	22.4
34	Jammu Airport	Jammu	Jammu and Kashmir	IXJ	1,813	2,242	19.1
35	Aurangabad Airport	Aurangabad	Maharashtra	IXU	1,729	1,436	20.4
36	Sri Guru Ram Dass Jee International Airport	Amritsar	Punjab	ATQ	1,676	1,355	23.7
37	Leh Kushok Bakula Rimpochee Airport	Leh	Ladakh	IXL	1,622	1,665	2.6
38	Lal Bahadur Shastri International Airport	Varanasi	Uttar Pradesh	VNS	1,190	1,052	13.1
39	Raja Bhoj International Airport	Bhopal	Madhya Pradesh	BHO	1,153	904	27.5
40	Lengpui Airport	Aizawl	Mizoram	AJL	746	730	2.2
41	Dibrugarh Airport	Dibrugarh	Assam	DIB	665	543	22.5
42	Dimapur Airport	Dimapur	Nagaland	DMU	567	398	42.5
43	Silchar Airport	Silchar	Assam	IXS	522	312	67.3
44	Juhu Aerodrome	Mumbai	Maharashtra	N/A	382	372	2.7
45	Rajkot Airport	Rajkot	Gujarat	RAJ	289	244	18.4
46	Jolly Grant Airport	Dehradun	Uttarakhand	DED	219	268	18.3
47	Jabalpur Airport	Jabalpur	Madhya Pradesh	JLR	54	20	170.0
48	Jorhat Airport	Jorhat	Assam	JRH	50	66	24.2
49	Bhuj Airport	Bhuj	Gujarat	BHJ	29	30	3.3
50	Tuticorin Airport	Thoothukudi	Tamil Nadu	TCR	25	58	56.9

Source: Airports Authority of India

=== 2016-17 ===
Cargo handled for FY 2016–17
Rank	Name	City	State/UT	IATA code	Cargo tonnes 2016-17	Cargo tonnes 2015-16	% change
1	Indira Gandhi International Airport	Delhi	Delhi	DEL	857,419	787,169	8.9
2	Chhatrapati Shivaji Maharaj International Airport	Mumbai	Maharashtra	BOM	782,289	705,249	10.9
3	Chennai International Airport	Chennai	Tamil Nadu	MAA	359,217	315,625	13.8
4	Kempegowda International Airport	Bangalore	Karnataka	BLR	319,344	291,950	9.4
5	Netaji Subhash Chandra Bose International Airport	Kolkata	West Bengal	CCU	152,415	139,878	9.0
6	Rajiv Gandhi International Airport	Hyderabad	Telangana	HYD	121,882	110,033	10.8
7	Cochin International Airport	Kochi	Kerala	COK	81,485	79,233	2.8
8	Sardar Vallabhbhai Patel International Airport	Ahmedabad	Gujarat	AMD	76,602	67,774	13.0
9	Pune International Airport	Pune	Maharashtra	PNQ	35,312	31,766	11.2
10	Trivandrum International Airport	Thiruvananthapuram	Kerala	TRV	28,450	35,570	20.0
11	Lokpriya Gopinath Bordoloi International Airport	Guwahati	Assam	GAU	17,286	15,628	10.6
12	Jaipur International Airport	Jaipur	Rajasthan	JAI	16,126	9,370	72.1
13	Calicut International Airport	Kozhikode	Kerala	CCJ	14,023	13,354	5.0
14	Coimbatore International Airport	Coimbatore	Tamil Nadu	CJB	10,139	7,792	30.1
15	Biju Patnaik International Airport	Bhubaneswar	Odisha	BBI	8,239	7,002	17.7
16	Devi Ahilyabai Holkar Airport	Indore	Madhya Pradesh	IDR	7,668	6,992	9.7
17	Dr. Babasaheb Ambedkar International Airport	Nagpur	Maharashtra	NAG	7,145	6,391	11.8
18	Tiruchirappalli International Airport	Tiruchirappalli	Tamil Nadu	TRZ	6,867	6,582	4.3
19	Jay Prakash Narayan International Airport	Patna	Bihar	PAT	6,591	4,414	49.3
20	Agartala Airport	Agartala	Tripura	IXA	6,057	5,456	11.0
21	Chandigarh International Airport	Chandigarh	Chandigarh	IXC	5,697	4,559	25.0
22	Srinagar Airport	Srinagar	Jammu and Kashmir	SXR	4,882	5,396	9.5
23	Chaudhary Charan Singh International Airport	Lucknow	Uttar Pradesh	LKO	4,843	4,957	2.3
24	Birsa Munda Airport	Ranchi	Jharkhand	IXR	4,841	4,183	15.7
25	Imphal Airport	Imphal	Manipur	IMF	4,720	4,266	10.6
26	Visakhapatnam Airport	Visakhapatnam	Andhra Pradesh	VTZ	4,708	2,960	59.1
27	Veer Savarkar International Airport	Port Blair	Andaman and Nicobar	IXZ	4,655	3,842	21.2
28	Swami Vivekananda Airport	Raipur	Chhattisgarh	RPR	4,561	4,353	4.8
29	Bagdogra Airport	Bagdogra	West Bengal	IXB	4,312	4,227	2.0
30	Dabolim Airport	Goa	Goa	GOI	4,103	4,880	15.9
31	Vadodara Airport	Vadodara	Gujarat	BDQ	2,973	2,144	38.7
32	Jammu Airport	Jammu	Jammu and Kashmir	IXJ	2,242	1,681	33.4
33	Leh Kushok Bakula Rimpochee Airport	Leh	Ladakh	IXL	1,665	1,442	15.5
34	Aurangabad Airport	Aurangabad	Maharashtra	IXU	1,436	1,406	2.1
35	Sri Guru Ram Dass Jee International Airport	Amritsar	Punjab	ATQ	1,355	835	62.3
36	Mangalore International Airport	Mangalore	Karnataka	IXE	1,242	936	32.7
37	Lal Bahadur Shastri International Airport	Varanasi	Uttar Pradesh	VNS	1,052	961	9.5
38	Madurai International Airport	Madurai	Tamil Nadu	IXM	1031	931	10.7
39	Raja Bhoj International Airport	Bhopal	Madhya Pradesh	BHO	904	1,153	21.6
40	Lengpui Airport	Aizawl	Mizoram	AJL	730	286	155.2
41	Dibrugarh Airport	Dibrugarh	Assam	DIB	543	389	39.6
42	Dimapur Airport	Dimapur	Nagaland	DMU	398	203	96.1
43	Juhu Aerodrome	Mumbai	Maharashtra	N/A	372	381	2.4
44	Silchar Airport	Silchar	Assam	IXS	312	443	29.6
45	Jolly Grant Airport	Dehradun	Uttarakhand	DED	268	94	185.1
46	Rajkot Airport	Rajkot	Gujarat	RAJ	244	170	43.5
47	Jorhat Airport	Jorhat	Assam	JRH	66	16	312.5
48	Tuticorin Airport	Thoothukudi	Tamil Nadu	TCR	58	67	13.4
49	Jamnagar Airport	Jamnagar	Gujarat	JGA	48	80	40.0
50	Bhuj Airport	Bhuj	Gujarat	BHJ	30	23	30.4

Source: Airports Authority of India

=== 2015-16 ===
Cargo handled for FY 2015–16
Rank	Name	City	State/UT	IATA code	Cargo tonnes 2015-16	Cargo tonnes 2014-15	% change
1	Indira Gandhi International Airport	Delhi	Delhi	DEL	787,168	696,539	13.0
2	Chhatrapati Shivaji Maharaj International Airport	Mumbai	Maharashtra	BOM	705,259	694,260	1.6
3	Chennai International Airport	Chennai	Tamil Nadu	MAA	315,625	303,904	3.9
4	Kempegowda International Airport	Bangalore	Karnataka	BLR	291,950	279,475	4.5
5	Netaji Subhash Chandra Bose International Airport	Kolkata	West Bengal	CCU	139,679	136,699	2.2
6	Rajiv Gandhi International Airport	Hyderabad	Telangana	HYD	110,033	98,899	11.3
7	Cochin International Airport	Kochi	Kerala	COK	79,233	70,787	11.9
8	Sardar Vallabhbhai Patel International Airport	Ahmedabad	Gujarat	AMD	67,774	59,313	14.3
9	Thiruvananthapuram International Airport	Thiruvananthapuram	Kerala	TRV	35,570	29,904	18.9
10	Pune International Airport	Pune	Maharashtra	PNQ	31,766	27,390	16
11	Lokpriya Gopinath Bordoloi International Airport	Guwahati	Assam	GAU	15,628	10,460	49.4
12	Kozhikode International Airport	Kozhikode	Kerala	CCJ	13,354	22,849	41.6
13	Jaipur International Airport	Jaipur	Rajasthan	JAI	9,370	3,359	187.5
14	Coimbatore International Airport	Coimbatore	Tamil Nadu	CJB	7,792	8,364	6.8
15	Biju Patnaik International Airport	Bhubaneswar	Odisha	BBI	7,002	5,950	17.7
16	Devi Ahilyabai Holkar Airport	Indore	Madhya Pradesh	IDR	6,992	6,315	10.7
17	Tiruchirappalli International Airport	Tiruchirappalli	Tamil Nadu	TRZ	6,582	4,926	33.6
18	Dr. Babasaheb Ambedkar International Airport	Nagpur	Maharashtra	NAG	6,391	6,031	6.0
19	Agartala Airport	Agartala	Tripura	IXA	5,456	5,681	4.0
20	Srinagar Airport	Srinagar	Jammu and Kashmir	SXR	5,396	5,853	7.8
21	Chaudhary Charan Singh International Airport	Lucknow	Uttar Pradesh	LKO	4,957	4,860	2.0
22	Dabolim Airport	Goa	Goa	GOI	4,880	4,498	8.5
23	Chandigarh International Airport	Chandigarh	Chandigarh	IXC	4,559	5,065	10.0
24	Lok Nayak Jayaprakash Airport	Patna	Bihar	PAT	4,414	5,198	15.1
25	Swami Vivekananda Airport	Raipur	Chhattisgarh	RPR	4,353	3,951	10.2
26	Imphal Airport	Imphal	Manipur	IMF	4,266	4,467	4.5
27	Bagdogra Airport	Bagdogra	West Bengal	IXB	4,227	2,235	89.1
28	Birsa Munda Airport	Ranchi	Jharkhand	IXR	4,085	3,496	16.8
29	Veer Savarkar International Airport	Port Blair	Andaman and Nicobar	IXZ	3,842	3,046	26.1
30	Visakhapatnam Airport	Visakhapatnam	Andhra Pradesh	VTZ	2,960	1,244	137.9
31	Vadodara Airport	Vadodara	Gujarat	BDQ	2,244	2,063	3.9
32	Jammu Airport	Jammu	Jammu and Kashmir	IXJ	1,681	1,685	0.2
33	Leh Kushok Bakula Rimpochee Airport	Leh	Ladakh	IXL	1,442	1,339	7.7
34	Aurangabad Airport	Aurangabad	Maharashtra	IXU	1,406	1,250	12.5
35	Raja Bhoj International Airport	Bhopal	Madhya Pradesh	BHO	1,153	937	23.1
36	Lal Bahadur Shastri International Airport	Varanasi	Uttar Pradesh	VNS	961	662	45.2
37	Mangalore International Airport	Mangalore	Karnataka	IXE	936	684	36.8
38	Madurai International Airport	Madurai	Tamil Nadu	IXM	931	1,074	13.3
39	Sri Guru Ram Dass Jee International Airport	Amritsar	Punjab	ATQ	833	858	2.7
40	Silchar Airport	Silchar	Assam	IXS	443	415	6.7
41	Dibrugarh Airport	Dibrugarh	Assam	DIB	389	336	15.8
42	Juhu Aerodrome	Mumbai	Maharashtra	N/A	381	407	6.4
43	Lengpui Airport	Aizawl	Mizoram	AJL	286	266	7.5
44	Dimapur Airport	Dimapur	Nagaland	DMU	203	174	16.7
45	Rajkot Airport	Rajkot	Gujarat	RAJ	170	134	26.9
46	Jolly Grant Airport	Dehradun	Uttrakhand	DED	94	43	118.6
47	Jamnagar Airport	Jamnagar	Gujarat	JGA	80	169	52.7
48	Tuticorin Airport	Thoothukudi	Tamil Nadu	TCR	67	52	28.8
49	Maharana Pratap Airport	Udaipur	Rajasthan	UDR	54	35	54.3
50	Bhuj Airport	Bhuj	Gujarat	BHJ	23	17	35.3

Source: Airports Authority of India

== See also ==
- World's busiest airports by passenger traffic
- List of airports in India
