= Zimbabwe national football team results (2020–present) =

This article provides details of international football games played by the Zimbabwe national football team from 2020 to present.

== Results ==
Key
Win
Draw
Defeat

=== 2020 ===
11 October 2020 Friendly	Malawi	0–0	Zimbabwe	Blantyre, Malawi
14:30 UTC+2		Report		Stadium: Mpira Stadium; Referee: Gift Chicco (Malawi)

12 November 2020 2021 AFCON Q	Algeria	3–1	Zimbabwe	Algiers, Algeria
20:00 UTC+1	Bounedjah 31'; Feghouli 43'; Mahrez 67'	Report	Kadewere 79'	Stadium: Stade du 5 Juillet; Referee: Sidi Alioum (Cameroon)

16 November 2020 2021 AFCON Q	Zimbabwe	2–2	Algeria	Harare, Zimbabwe
15:00 UTC+2	Musona 43'; Dube 82'	Report	Delort 34'; Mahrez 38'	Stadium: National Sports Stadium; Referee: Mahmood Ali Mahmood (Sudan)

=== 2021 ===
16 January 2021 2020 CHAN	Cameroon	1–0	Zimbabwe	Yaoundé, Cameroon
17:00	Banga 72'	Report		Stadium: Stade Ahmadou Ahidjo; Attendance: 0 Referee: Jean-Jacques Ndala (DR Congo)

20 January 2021 2020 CHAN	Burkina Faso	3–1	Zimbabwe	Yaoundé, Cameroon
20:00	Sosso 14'; Kiendrébéogo 53'; Ouedraogo 67'	Report	Jaure 23'	Stadium: Stade Ahmadou Ahidjo; Referee: Mahmoud Mohamed (Egypt)

24 January 2021 2020 CHAN	Zimbabwe	0–1	Mali	Douala, Cameroon
20:00				Stadium: Japoma Stadium

25 March 2021 2021 AFCON Q	Botswana	0–1	Zimbabwe	Francistown, Botswana
18:00 UTC+2		Report	Chikwende 14'	Stadium: Francistown Stadium; Referee: Georges Gatogato (Burundi)

29 March 2021 2021 AFCON Q	Zimbabwe	0–2	Zambia	Harare, Zimbabwe
21:00 UTC+2		Report	Daka 21', 90+2'	Stadium: National Sports Stadium; Referee: Molise Retselisitsoe (Lesotho)

3 September 2021 2022 World Cup qualification	Zimbabwe	0–0	South Africa	Harare, Zimbabwe
15:00 UTC+2		Report		Stadium: National Sports Stadium; Referee: Mahmoud El Banna (Egypt)

7 September 2021 2022 World Cup qualification	Ethiopia	1–0	Zimbabwe	Bahir Dar, Ethiopia
19:00 UTC+3	Tamene 90+4' (pen.)	Report		Stadium: Bahir Dar Stadium; Referee: Bernard Camille (Seychelles)

9 October 2021 2022 World Cup qualification	Ghana	3–1	Zimbabwe	Cape Coast, Ghana
16:00 UTC+0	Kudus 5'; Partey 66'; A. Ayew 87'	Report	Musona 49' (pen.)	Stadium: Cape Coast Sports Stadium; Referee: Pierre Atcho (Gabon)

12 October 2021 2022 World Cup qualification	Zimbabwe	0–1	Ghana	Harare, Zimbabwe
15:00 UTC+2		Report	Partey 31'	Stadium: National Sports Stadium; Attendance: 0 Referee: Amin Omar (Egypt)

11 November 2021 2022 World Cup qualification	South Africa	1–0	Zimbabwe	Johannesburg, South Africa
21:00 UTC+2	Mokoena 26'	Report		Stadium: FNB Stadium; Referee: Sadok Selmi (Tunisia)

14 November 2021 2022 World Cup qualification	Zimbabwe	1–1	Ethiopia	Harare, Zimbabwe
15:00 UTC+2	Mahachi 39'	Report	Nassir 86'	Stadium: National Sports Stadium; Referee: Mohamed Ali Moussa (Niger)

=== 2022 ===
2 January 2022 Friendly	Zimbabwe	0–0	Sudan	Yaoundé, Cameroon
16:00 UTC+1				Stadium: Rain Forest International Stadium

10 January 2022 AFCON	Senegal	1–0	Zimbabwe	Bafoussam, Cameroon
14:00 UTC+1	Mané 90+7' (pen.)	Report		Stadium: Kouekong Stadium; Referee: Mario Escobar (Guatemala)

14 January 2022 2021 AFCON	Malawi	2–1	Zimbabwe	Bafoussam, Cameroon
17:00 UTC+1	Mhango 43', 58'	Report	Wadi 38'	Stadium: Kouekong Stadium; Referee: Dahane Beida (Mauritania)

18 January 2022 2021 AFCON	Zimbabwe	2–1	Guinea	Yaoundé, Cameroon
17:00 UTC+1	Musona 26'; Mahachi 43'	Report	N. Keïta 49'	Stadium: Stade Ahmadou Ahidjo; Referee: Salima Mukansanga (Rwanda)

9 June 2022 2023 AFCON Q	Zimbabwe	Cancelled	Liberia	Zimbabwe
15:00 UTC+2

13 June 2022 2023 AFCON Q	South Africa	Cancelled	Zimbabwe	South Africa
15:00 UTC+2

September 2022 2023 AFCON Q	Morocco	Cancelled	Zimbabwe	Morocco
--:-- UTC+1

September 2022 2023 AFCON Q	Zimbabwe	Cancelled	Morocco	Zimbabwe
--:-- UTC+2

March 2023 2023 AFCON Q	Liberia	Cancelled	Zimbabwe	Liberia
--:-- UTC+0

March 2023 2023 AFCON Q	Zimbabwe	Cancelled	South Africa	Zimbabwe
--:-- UTC+2

=== 2023 ===
30 September Friendly	Botswana	1–1	Zimbabwe	Gaborone, Botswana
04:00 UTC+2	Maswena 68'	Report	Chirinda 63'	Stadium: Botswana National Stadium

15 November 2026 World Cup qualification	Rwanda	0–0	Zimbabwe	Butare, Rwanda
15:00 UTC+2		Report		Stadium: Stade Huye; Attendance: 7,500; Referee: Mohamed Ali Moussa (Niger)

19 November 2026 World Cup qualification	Zimbabwe	1–1	Nigeria	Butare, Rwanda
15:00 UTC+2	Musona 26'	Report	Iheanacho 67'	Stadium: Stade Huye; Attendance: 2,876; Referee: Souleiman Ahmed Djama (Djibouti)

=== 2024 ===
23 March Friendly	Zambia	2–2 (5–6 p)	Zimbabwe	Lilongwe, Malawi
08:00 UTC+2	Sunzu 5'; Chama 24'	Report	Bonne 30'; Musona 45+2'	Stadium: Bingu National Stadium; Attendance: 21,000; Referee: Dickens Mimisa
	Penalties
	Daka (penalty scored); Banda (penalty missed); Nsabata (penalty missed); Mphande (penalty scored); Chama (penalty scored); Mashata (penalty scored); Chepeshi (penalty scored); Sunzu (penalty missed)		Musona (penalty missed); Takwara (penalty scored); Lunga (penalty missed); Kadewere (penalty scored); Munetsi (penalty scored); Rinomhota (penalty scored); Donovan (penalty scored); Msendami (penalty scored)

26 March Friendly	Zimbabwe	1–3	Kenya	Lilongwe, Malawi
		Report		Stadium: Bingu National Stadium

7 June 2026 World Cup qualification	Zimbabwe	0–2	Lesotho	Johannesburg, South Africa
15:00 UTC+2		Report	Rasethuntša 21'; Thabantso 31'	Stadium: Orlando Stadium; Referee: Thulani Sibandze (Eswatini)

11 June 2026 World Cup qualification	South Africa	3–1	Zimbabwe	Bloemfontein, South Africa
18:00 UTC+2	Rayners 1'; Morena 55', 76'	Report	Chirewa 2'	Stadium: Free State Stadium; Referee: Mohamed Maarouf Eid Mansour (Egypt)

27 June 2024 COSAFA Cup	Zimbabwe	1–0	Comoros	Gqeberha, South Africa
15:00	Tapera 53'	Report		Stadium: Nelson Mandela Bay Stadium

30 June 2024 COSAFA Cup	Zambia	0–2	Zimbabwe	Gqeberha, South Africa
15:00		Report	Tapera 8'; Benhura 43'	Stadium: Isaac Wolfson Stadium

2 July 2024 COSAFA Cup	Kenya	2–0	Zimbabwe	Gqeberha, South Africa
12:00	A. Odhiambo 54'; Omalla 73'	Report		Stadium: Isaac Wolfson Stadium

6 September 2025 Africa Cup of Nations qualification	Kenya	0–0	Zimbabwe	Kampala, Uganda
16:00 UTC+3		Report		Stadium: Mandela National Stadium; Referee: Adalbert Douf (Senegal)

10 September 2025 Africa Cup of Nations qualification	Zimbabwe	0–0	Cameroon	Kampala, Uganda
19:00 UTC+3		Report		Stadium: Mandela National Stadium; Referee: Mahmoud El Banna (Egypt)

10 October 2025 Africa Cup of Nations qualification	Namibia	0–1	Zimbabwe	Johannesburg, South Africa
15:00 UTC+2		Report	Billiat 34' (pen.)	Stadium: Orlando Stadium; Referee: Patrice Mebiame (Gabon)

14 October 2025 Africa Cup of Nations qualification	Zimbabwe	3–1	Namibia	Johannesburg, South Africa
18:00 UTC+2	Musona 50', 61' (pen.); Dube 89'	Report	Eiseb 90'	Stadium: Orlando Stadium; Referee: Yannick Malala (DR Congo)

10 November 2025 Africa Cup of Nations qualification	Zimbabwe	1–1	Kenya	Polokwane, South Africa
18:00 CAT (UTC+02:00)	Maswanhise 32'	Report	Ayunga 52'	Stadium: Peter Mokaba Stadium; Referee: Messie Jessie Nkounkou Mvoutou (Congo)

18 November 2025 Africa Cup of Nations qualification	Cameroon	2–1	Zimbabwe	Yaoundé
15:00 CAT (UTC+02:00)	Aboubakar 18', N'Koudou 23'	Report	Dzukamanja 73'	Stadium: Stade Omnisport Ahmadou Ahidjo; Referee: Referee: Pacifique Ndabihawenimana (Burundi)

=== 2025 ===
20 March 2026 World Cup qualification	Zimbabwe	2–2	Benin	Durban, South Africa
18:00 UTC+2	Munetsi 44'; Musona 59'	Report (FIFA); Report (CAF)	Mounié 12'; Dokou 35'	Stadium: Moses Mabhida Stadium; Attendance: 5,000; Referee: Bamlak Tessema Weyesa (Ethiopia)

25 March 2026 World Cup qualification	Nigeria	1–1	Zimbabwe	Uyo, Nigeria
17:00 UTC+1	Osimhen 74'	Report (FIFA); Report (CAF)	Chirewa 90'	Stadium: Godswill Akpabio International Stadium; Referee: Tsegay Mogos Teklu (Eritrea)

4 June 2025 COSAFA Cup	Mauritius	0–0	Zimbabwe	Bloemfontein, South Africa
18:00 UTC+2		Report		Stadium: Free State Stadium; Referee: Godfrey Nkhakananga (Malawi)

7 June 2025 COSAFA Cup	South Africa	2–0	Zimbabwe	Bloemfontein, South Africa
15:00 UTC+2	Dlamini 40' (pen.); Okon 78'	Report		Stadium: Dr. Petrus Molemela Stadium; Referee: Thabang Ketshabile (Botswana)

10 June 2025 COSAFA Cup	Mozambique	1–3	Zimbabwe	Bloemfontein, South Africa
18:00 UTC+2	Calção 38'	Report	Ngwenya 27', 36' (pen.); Makunike 90+5'	Stadium: Dr. Petrus Molemela Stadium; Referee: Godfrey Nkhakananga (Malawi)

6 September 2026 World Cup qualification	Benin	1–0	Zimbabwe	Abidjan, Ivory Coast
17:00 UTC+0	Mounié 77'	Report		Stadium: Alassane Ouattara Stadium; Attendance: 457; Referee: Lamin Jammeh (Gambia)

9 September 2026 World Cup qualification	Zimbabwe	0–1	Rwanda	Johannesburg, South Africa
16:00 UTC+2		Report	Mugisha 39'	Stadium: Orlando Stadium; Referee: Abdou Abdel Mefire (Cameroon)

10 October 2026 World Cup qualification	Zimbabwe	0–0	South Africa	Durban, South Africa
18:00 UTC+2	Musona (red card) 64'	Report	Mbokazi (red card) 90+7'	Stadium: Moses Mabhida Stadium; Referee: Mustapha Ghorbal (Algeria)

13 October 2026 World Cup qualification	Lesotho	1–0	Zimbabwe	Polokwane, South Africa
18:00 UTC+2	Kalake 90+3'	Report		Stadium: Peter Mokaba Stadium; Attendance: 3,500; Referee: Tsegay Mogos Teklu (Eritrea)

13 November Friendly	Algeria	3–1	Zimbabwe	Jeddah, Saudi Arabia
19:30 UTC+3	Bounedjah 14'; Amoura 41'; Hadjam 45+1'	Report	Chirewa 88' (pen.)	Stadium: Prince Abdullah Al-Faisal Sports City Stadium; Referee: Abdullah Dhafer Al Shehri (Saudi Arabia)

17 November Friendly	Qatar	1–2	Zimbabwe	Doha, Qatar
19:30 UTC+3	Gouda 9'	Report	Garananga 24'; Antonio 74'	Stadium: Abdullah bin Khalifa Stadium; Referee: Mohamed Ebrahim Saad (Bahrain)

22 December 2025 AFCON Group B	Egypt	2–1	Zimbabwe	Agadir, Morocco
21:00 UTC+1	Marmoush 64'; Salah 90+1'	Report	Dube 20'	Stadium: Adrar Stadium; Referee: Issa Sy (Senegal)

26 December 2025 AFCON Group B	Angola	1–1	Zimbabwe	Marrakesh, Morocco
13:30 UTC+1	Dala 24'	Report	Musona 45+6'	Stadium: Marrakesh Stadium; Referee: Peter Waweru (Kenya)

29 December 2025 AFCON Group B	Zimbabwe	2–3	South Africa	Marrakesh, Morocco
17:00 UTC+1	Maswanhise 19'; Modiba 73' (o.g.)	Report	Moremi 7'; Foster 50'; Appollis 82' (pen.)	Stadium: Marrakesh Stadium; Referee: Mustapha Kech Chaf (Morocco)

=== 2026 ===
28 March 2026 Four Nations Tournament semi-final	Botswana	0–3	Zimbabwe	Francistown, Botswana
18:00 UTC+2		Report	Tshuma 24'; Bonne 33'; Antonio 45'	Stadium: Obed Itani Chilume Stadium; Referee: Chanshi Kasongo (Zambia)

31 March 2026 Four Nations Tournament Final	Zambia	0–1	Zimbabwe	Francistown, Botswana
17:00 UTC+2		Report	Kafunti (o.g.)	Stadium: Obed Itani Chilume Stadium; Referee: Moemedi Thabologang(Botswana)

26 May 2026 Unity Cup	Nigeria	2–0	Zimbabwe	London, England
19:30 UTC+1	Azeez 4', 62'	Report		Stadium: The Valley; Referee: John Brooks (England)

30 May 2026 Unity Cup	Zimbabwe	1–0	India	London, England
14:30 UTC+1	Dube 34' (pen.)	Report		Stadium: The Valley; Referee: Andrew Madley (England)

24 September 2027 AFCON qualification	Sierra Leone	2–3	Zimbabwe	El Jadida, Morocco
19:00 UTC+0	Conteh 7'; Tarawallie 27'	Report	Munetsi 72', 89'; Chirewa 77'	Stadium: Ben M'Hamed El Abdi Stadium; Referee: Lucky Razake Kasalirwe (Uganda)

28 September 2027 AFCON qualification	Zimbabwe	1–2	DR Congo	Harare, Zimbabwe
18:00 UTC+2	Munetsi 90+3'	Report	Wissa 30'; Moutoussamy 45+2'	Stadium: National Sports Stadium; Referee: Amin Omar (Egypt)

11 November 2027 AFCON qualification	Equatorial Guinea	v	Zimbabwe	TBD, Equatorial Guinea
TBD				Stadium: TBD

15 November 2027 AFCON qualification	Zimbabwe	v	Equatorial Guinea	TBD, Zimbabwe
TBD				Stadium: TBD

== Forthcoming fixtures ==
The following matches are scheduled:

=== 2027 ===
24 March 2027 AFCON qualification	Zimbabwe	v	Sierra Leone	TBD, Zimbabwe
TBD				Stadium: TBD

28 March 2027 AFCON qualification	DR Congo	v	Zimbabwe	TBD, DR Congo
TBD				Stadium: TBD
