= 1988 African Cup of Nations qualification =

Football tournament

This page details the qualifying process for the 1988 African Cup of Nations in Morocco. Morocco, as hosts, and Egypt, as title holders, qualified automatically.

== Qualifying tournament ==
Egypt qualified as holders
Morocco qualified as hosts

=== Preliminary round ===
Team 1	Agg.	Team 2	1st leg	2nd leg
Guinea	3–1	Gambia	2–1	1–0
Uganda	5–0	Somalia	5–0	0–0
Angola	1–1 (5–3 p)	Gabon	1–0	0–1
Central African Republic	2–7	Congo	1–2	1–5
Sierra Leone	3–2	Liberia	2–1	1–1
Ethiopia	w/o	Tanzania	4–2	—
Madagascar	w/o	Mauritius	—	—
Rwanda	w/o	Lesotho	—	—
Togo	w/o	Equatorial Guinea	—	—
Tunisia	w/o	Mali	—	—

16 August 1986

Guinea	2–1	Gambia

Conakry
30 August 1986

Gambia	0–1	Guinea

Independence Stadium, Bakau

Guinea won 3–1 on aggregate.

5 October 1986

Uganda	5–0	Somalia

Kampala
19 October 1986

Somalia	0–0	Uganda

Mogadishu Stadium, Mogadishu

Uganda won 5–0 on aggregate.

5 October 1986

Angola	1–0	Gabon
Bolingó

Estádio dos Coqueiros, Luanda
19 October 1986

Gabon	1–0	Angola
Anotho 68'
Penalties
	3–5

Stade Omar Bongo, Libreville

Angola won 5–3 on penalty shootout after 1–1 on aggregate.

5 October 1986

Central African Republic	1–2	Congo

Bangui
19 October 1986

Congo	5–1	Central African Republic

Stade de la Révolution, Brazzaville

Congo won 7–2 on aggregate.

5 October 1986

Sierra Leone	2–1	Liberia

Freetown
19 October 1986

Liberia	1–1	Sierra Leone

Monrovia

Sierra Leone won 3–2 on aggregate.

5 October 1986

Ethiopia	4–2	Tanzania

Addis Abeba Stadium, Addis Ababa

Tanzania	Cancelled	Ethiopia
		Withdrew

Tanzania advanced after Ethiopia withdrew.

Madagascar	Cancelled	Mauritius
		Withdrew

Madagascar advanced after Mauritius withdrew.

Rwanda	Cancelled	Lesotho
		Withdrew

Rwanda advanced after Lesotho withdrew.

Togo	Cancelled	Equatorial Guinea
		Withdrew

Togo advanced after Equatorial Guinea withdrew.

Tunisia	Cancelled	Mali
		Withdrew

Tunisia advanced after Mali withdrew.

=== First round ===
Team 1	Agg.	Team 2	1st leg	2nd leg
Algeria	2–1	Tunisia	1–0	1–1
Kenya	3–2	Madagascar	2–0	1–2
Nigeria	3–1	Togo	2–0	1–1
Cameroon	6–4	Uganda	5–1	1–3
Ivory Coast	4–1	Congo	2–0	2–1
Mozambique	3–4	Zimbabwe	1–1	2–3
Senegal	4–0	Guinea	4–0	0–0
Sudan	2–1	Tanzania	1–0	1–1
Zaire	3–1	Angola	3–0	0–1
Ghana	1–2	Sierra Leone	1–2	0–0
Libya	w/o	Zambia	—	—
Malawi	w/o	Rwanda	—	—

27 March 1987

Algeria	1–0	Tunisia
Madjer 19' (pen.)

5 July Stadium, Algiers
Attendance: 35,000
Referee: Hassan Chafai (Morocco)
14 April 1987

Tunisia	1–1	Algeria
Rakbaoui 31'		Menad 38'

Stade El Menzah, Tunis
Attendance: 50,000
Referee: Mohamed Hussam El-Din (Egypt)

Algeria won 2–1 on aggregate.

28 March 1987

Kenya	2–0	Madagascar
Ayoyi 31'; Magongo 41'

Mombasa Municipal Stadium, Mombasa
Referee: Yusuf Mohamed Sheikh (Egypt)
12 April 1987

Madagascar	2–1	Kenya
Yves 10'; Velonosy 15'		Odembo 30'

Mahamasina Municipal Stadium, Antananarivo
Referee: John Nkathazo (Zimbabwe)

Kenya won 3–2 on aggregate.

28 March 1987

Nigeria	2–0	Togo
Okorowanta 17'; Obobaifo 45'

Surulere Stadium, Lagos
Referee: Albert Agbovi (Ghana)
12 April 1987

Togo	1–1	Nigeria
? 36'		Edobor 90'

Lomé
Referee: François Boni Yapo (Ivory Coast)

Nigeria won 3–1 on aggregate.

29 March 1987

Cameroon	5–1	Uganda
Ekéké 12'; Sinkot 21'; Omam-Biyik 49', 52'; Milla 67'		Nkata 34'

Ahmadou Ahidjo Stadium, Yaoundé
Referee: Pierre Alain Mounguengui (Gabon)
11 April 1987

Uganda	3–1	Cameroon
Hasule 41'; Mokiri 50'; Bogere 69'		Omam-Biyik 79'

Kampala
Referee: Mohamed Abdelsalam Gasmalla (Sudan)

Cameroon won 6–4 on aggregate.

29 March 1987

Ivory Coast	2–0	Congo
Traoré; Fofana

Stade Félix Houphouët-Boigny, Abidjan
Referee: Festus Okubule (Nigeria)
5 April 1987

Congo	1–2	Ivory Coast
Nkéoua		Traoré; Fofana

Stade de la Révolution, Brazzaville
Referee: Laurent Pettcha (Cameroon)

Ivory Coast won 4–1 on aggregate.

29 March 1987

Mozambique	1–1	Zimbabwe
Chababe		Chunga 12'

Estádio da Machava, Maputo
Referee: Macnever Mang'anda (Malawi)
11 April 1987

Zimbabwe	3–2	Mozambique
Ndunduma 39'; Tauro 63'; Chawanda 75'		Chababe 29'; Nico 62'

Rufaro Stadium, Harare
Referee: Wallace Mabuza (Swaziland)

Zimbabwe won 4–3 on aggregate.

29 March 1987

Senegal	4–0	Guinea
Sarr 24' (pen.), 72'; Seck 46'; Youm 90'

Dakar
Referee: Abdoulaye Sogue (Mauritania)
12 April 1987

Guinea	0–0	Senegal

Conakry
Referee: Modibo N'Diaye (Mali)

Senegal won 4–0 on aggregate.

29 March 1987

Sudan	1–0	Tanzania
Waleed Tashein

Khartoum Stadium, Khartoum
11 April 1987

Tanzania	1–1	Sudan
Manara 19'		Majdi Kassala 59'

Dar es Salaam

Sudan won 2–1 on aggregate.

29 March 1987

Zaire	3–0	Angola
Tueba; Santos; Nkama

Stade du 20 Mai, Kinshasa
Referee: Kabalamuna Chayu (Zambia)
11 April 1987

Angola	1–0	Zaire
Jesus 19' (pen.)

Luanda
Referee: Gabriel Ondziel-Dinga (Congo)

Zaire won 3–1 on aggregate.

30 March 1987

Ghana	1–2	Sierra Leone
Abdul Razak 80'		Dumbuya 5', 55'

Accra Sports Stadium, Accra
Referee: Coker (Gambia)
11 April 1987

Sierra Leone	0–0	Ghana

Freetown
Referee: Moussa Kouyaté (Guinea)

Sierra Leone won 2–1 on aggregate.

Libya	Cancelled	Zambia
		Withdrew

Libya advanced after Zambia withdrew.

Malawi	Cancelled	Rwanda
		Withdrew

Malawi advanced after Rwanda withdrew.

=== Second round ===
Team 1	Agg.	Team 2	1st leg	2nd leg
Malawi	1–4	Ivory Coast	1–2	0–2
Nigeria	3–2	Sierra Leone	3–0	0–2
Cameroon	2–1	Sudan	2–0	0–1
Zimbabwe	1–1 (a)	Kenya	1–1	0–0
Senegal	0–0 (2–4 p)	Zaire	0–0	0–0
Algeria	w/o	Libya	—	—

3 July 1987

Malawi	1–2	Ivory Coast
Sinalo		Traoré

Lilongwe
Referee: Frank Valdemarca (Zimbabwe)
19 July 1987

Ivory Coast	2–0	Malawi
Traoré; Tiehi

Stade Félix Houphouët-Boigny, Abidjan
Referee: Mohamed Hussam El-Din (Egypt)

Ivory Coast won 4–1 on aggregate.

4 July 1987

Nigeria	3–0	Sierra Leone
Edobor; Siasia

Surulere Stadium, Lagos
Referee: Drissa Traoré (Mali)
18 July 1987

Sierra Leone	2–0	Nigeria
Dumbuya 5'; Kanu 90'

Freetown
Referee: Célestin N'Cho (Ivory Coast)

Nigeria won 3–2 on aggregate.

5 July 1987

Cameroon	2–0	Sudan
Omam-Biyik 3'; Milla 90'

Ahmadou Ahidjo Stadium, Yaoundé
Referee: Simon Bantsimba (Congo)
18 July 1987

Sudan	1–0	Cameroon
Jamal Kadous 50'

Khartoum Stadium, Khartoum
Referee: Bekele Kidane (Ethiopia)

Cameroon won 2–1 on aggregate.

5 July 1987

Zimbabwe	1–1	Kenya
Ndunduma 76'		Oyiela 88'

Rufaro Stadium, Harare
Referee: Diagarassen Desscann (Mauritius)
18 July 1987

Kenya	0–0	Zimbabwe

Nyayo National Stadium, Nairobi
Referee: Bester Kalombo (Malawi)

Kenya won by away goals rule after 1–1 on aggregate.

5 July 1987

Senegal	0–0	Zaire

Dakar
19 July 1987

Zaire	0–0	Senegal
Penalties
	4–2

Stade du 20 Mai, Kinshasa
Referee: Jean-Fidèle Diramba (Gabon)

Zaire won 4–2 on penalty shootout after 0–0 on aggregate.

Algeria	Cancelled	Libya
		Withdrew

Algeria advanced after Libya withdrew.

== Qualified teams ==
- Algeria
- Cameroon
- Egypt (holders)
- Ivory Coast
- Kenya
- Morocco (hosts)
- Nigeria
- Zaire
