= 1986 African Cup of Nations qualification =

Football tournament

This page details the qualifying process for the 1986 African Cup of Nations in Egypt. Egypt, as hosts, and Cameroon, as title holders, qualified automatically.

== Qualifying tournament ==
- Cameroon qualified as holders
- Egypt qualified as hosts

=== Preliminary round ===
Team 1	Agg.	Team 2	1st leg	2nd leg
Tanzania	3–2	Uganda	0–1	3–1
Mauritius	0–3	Mozambique	0–0	0–3
Zimbabwe	8–1	Swaziland	3–0	5–1
Somalia	1–1 (3–4 p)	Kenya	1–0	0–1
Zaire	3–1	Gabon	2–0	1–1
Liberia	3–4	Mauritania	3–1	0–3
Mali	3–2	Benin	1–0	2–2
Gambia	3–4	Sierra Leone	3–2	0–2

4 August 1984

Tanzania	0–1	Uganda

National Stadium, Dar es Salaam
18 August 1984

Uganda	1–3	Tanzania
Goal		Mogella; Mbunga

Kampala

Tanzania won 3–2 on aggregate.

16 September 1984

Mauritius	0–0	Mozambique

Stade George V, Curepipe
30 September 1984

Mozambique	3–0	Mauritius
Chico João

Estádio da Machava, Maputo

Mozambique won 3–0 on aggregate.

14 October 1984

Zimbabwe	3–0	Swaziland
M. Ndlovu; B. Ndlovu; Mpariwa

Barbourfields Stadium, Bulawayo
4 November 1984

Swaziland	1–5	Zimbabwe
Goal		Chunga; Khumalo; Ndunduma

Mbabane

Zimbabwe won 8–1 on aggregate.

9 November 1984

Somalia	1–0	Kenya
M. Abdi Noor 17'

Mogadishu Stadium, Mogadishu
23 November 1984

Kenya	1–0	Somalia
Muse 53' (o.g.)
Penalties
	4–3

Nyayo National Stadium, Nairobi

Kenya won 4–3 on penalty shootout after 1–1 on aggregate.

11 November 1984

Zaire	2–0	Gabon
Mulamba 63'; Mbote 89'

Stade du 20 Mai, Kinshasa
25 November 1984

Gabon	1–1	Zaire
Minko 23'		Mayanga 84'

Stade Omar Bongo, Libreville

Zaire won 3–1 on aggregate.

11 November 1984

Liberia	3–1	Mauritania
E.Morgan; A.Doyen		B. Diouf

Monrovia
23 November 1984

Mauritania	3–0	Liberia

Nouakchott

Mauritania won 4–3 on aggregate.

18 November 1984

Mali	1–0	Benin
Kaloga 90'

Bamako
2 December 1984

Benin	2–2	Mali
Goal		S.Diarra 76'; P.Coulibaly 77'

Stade de l'Amitié, Cotonou

Mali won 3–2 on aggregate.

18 November 1984

Gambia	3–2	Sierra Leone

Independence Stadium, Bakau
2 December 1984

Sierra Leone	2–0	Gambia

Siaka Steven Stadium, Freetown

Sierra Leone won 4–3 on aggregate.

=== First round ===
Team 1	Agg.	Team 2	1st leg	2nd leg
Madagascar	2–6	Zimbabwe	0–1	2–5
Algeria	5–1	Mauritania	4–0	1–1
Libya	2–1	Tunisia	2–0	0–1
Ghana	5–2	Guinea	1–1	4–1
Ivory Coast	7–1	Mali	6–0	1–1
Malawi	2–2 (5–6 p)	Mozambique	1–1	1–1
Togo	1–2	Senegal	0–1	1–1
Congo	2–5	Zaire	2–5	0–0
Kenya	w/o	Sudan	—	—
Morocco	w/o	Sierra Leone	—	—
Nigeria	w/o	Tanzania	—	—
Zambia	w/o	Ethiopia	—	—

3 March 1985

Madagascar	0–1	Zimbabwe
		Stix 62'

Mahamasina Municipal Stadium, Antananarivo
23 March 1985

Zimbabwe	5–2	Madagascar
Phiri; B. Ndlovu; Ndunduma; Shambo; Chunga		Goal

Rufaro Stadium, Harare

Zimbabwe won 6–2 on aggregate.

8 March 1985

Algeria	4–0	Mauritania
Belloumi 6' (pen.); Bouiche 27'; Cissé 58' (o.g.); Menad 68'

5 July Stadium, Algiers
Attendance: 4,000
Referee: Habib Mimouni (Tunisia)
22 March 1985

Mauritania	1–1	Algeria
Dieng 19'		Bouiche 43'

Stade Olympique, Nouakchott
Attendance: 12,000
Referee: Cheikh D'Jibril M'Baye (Senegal)

Algeria won 5–1 on aggregate.

29 March 1985

Libya	2–0	Tunisia
Al-Maadani; Al-Beshari

11 June Stadium, Tripoli
14 April 1985

Tunisia	1–0	Libya
Jeridi 26'

Stade El Menzah, Tunis

Libya won 2–1 on aggregate.

31 March 1985

Ghana	1–1	Guinea

Accra Sports Stadium, Accra
14 April 1985

Guinea	1–4	Ghana
Goal		Abedi Pele; Ansah; Alhassan; Nti

Stade du 28 Septembre, Conakry

Ghana won 5–2 on aggregate.

31 March 1985

Ivory Coast	6–0	Mali
A. Traoré 3', 48', 51'; Kouadio 7', 37'; Fofana 70'

Stade Félix Houphouët-Boigny, Abidjan
14 April 1985

Mali	1–1	Ivory Coast
I. Traoré 72' (pen.)		A. Traoré 25'

Bamako

Ivory Coast won 7–1 on aggregate.

31 March 1985

Malawi	1–1	Mozambique
Waya		Goal

Lilongwe
16 April 1985

Mozambique	1–1	Malawi
Amade		Sinalo
Penalties
	6–5

Estádio da Machava, Maputo

Mozambique won 6–5 on penalty shootout after 2–2 on aggregate.

31 March 1985

Togo	0–1	Senegal

Tsévié
14 April 1985

Senegal	1–1	Togo

Stade Demba Diop, Dakar

Senegal won 2–1 on aggregate.

31 March 1985

Congo	2–5	Zaire
Nis 42'; Nkounkou 80'		Santos 5'; Kabongo 15', 50'; Ngeleme 25'; Kiyika 28'

Stade de la Révolution, Brazzaville
14 April 1985

Zaire	0–0	Congo

Stade du 20 Mai, Kinshasa

Zaire won 5–2 on aggregate.

Kenya	Cancelled	Sudan
		Withdrew

Kenya advanced after Sudan withdrew.

Morocco	Cancelled	Sierra Leone
		Withdrew

Morocco advanced after Sierra Leone withdrew.

Nigeria	Cancelled	Tanzania
		Withdrew

Nigeria advanced after Tanzania withdrew.

Zambia	Cancelled	Ethiopia
		Withdrew

Zambia advanced after Ethiopia withdrew.

=== Second round ===
Team 1	Agg.	Team 2	1st leg	2nd leg
Kenya	0–3	Algeria	0–0	0–3
Nigeria	0–1	Zambia	0–0	0–1
Ivory Coast	2–0	Ghana	2–0	0–0
Zimbabwe	1–3	Senegal	1–0	0–3
Libya	3–3 (3–4 p)	Mozambique	2–1	1–2
Morocco	1–0	Zaire	1–0	0–0

4 August 1985

Kenya	0–0	Algeria

Nyayo National Stadium, Nairobi
Attendance: 15,000
Referee: Ali Tahir Hafidh (Tanzania)
13 August 1985

Algeria	3–0	Kenya
Benkhalidi 16', 72'; Madjer 75'

5 July Stadium, Algiers
Attendance: 15,000
Referee: Badara Sène (Senegal)

Algeria won 3–0 on aggregate.

10 August 1985

Nigeria	0–0	Zambia

Lagos
18 August 1985

Zambia	1–0	Nigeria
Chanda 86'

Lusaka

Zambia won 1–0 on aggregate.

18 August 1985

Ivory Coast	2–0	Ghana

Stade Félix Houphouët-Boigny, Abidjan
1 September 1985

Ghana	0–0	Ivory Coast

Kumasi Sports Stadium, Kumasi

Ivory Coast won 2–0 on aggregate.

18 August 1985

Zimbabwe	1–0	Senegal
Ndunduma 65'

Rufaro Stadium, Harare
1 September 1985

Senegal	3–0	Zimbabwe
Bocandé (pen.)

Stade Demba Diop, Dakar

Senegal won 3–1 on aggregate.

23 August 1985

Libya	2–1	Mozambique
Al-Issawi		Calton Banze

March 28 Stadium, Benghazi
15 September 1985

Mozambique	2–1	Libya
Goal		Al-Senussi
Penalties
	4–3

Estádio da Machava, Maputo

Mozambique won 4–3 on penalty shootout after 3–3 on aggregate.

25 August 1985

Morocco	1–0	Zaire
M. Merry 46' (pen.)

Stade Mohammed V, Casablanca
8 September 1985

Zaire	0–0	Morocco

Stade Municipal, Lubumbashi

Morocco won 1–0 on aggregate.

== Qualifying Teams ==
- Algeria
- Cameroon (holders)
- Egypt (hosts)
- Ivory Coast
- Morocco
- Mozambique
- Senegal
- Zambia
