= Stanley Ndunduma =

Zimbabwean association football player (1963–1994)

Personal information
- Date of birth: 5 March 1963
- Place of birth: Salisbury, Federation of Rhodesia and Nyasaland
- Date of death: 2 November 1994 (aged 31)
- Place of death: Swaziland
- Position: Right winger

Senior career*
Years	Team	Apps	(Gls)
1980–1983	CAPS United		
1984–1989	Black Rhinos		

International career
- Zimbabwe U20
- Zimbabwe U23
1981–1989	Zimbabwe	62	(9)

Managerial career
- –1994: Eleven Men in Flight
- * Club domestic league appearances and goals

Stanley Ndunduma (5 March 1963 – 2 November 1994), nicknamed "Sinyo", was a Zimbabwean footballer who played as a right winger for the Zimbabwe national team.

== Career ==
Ndunduma made 62 appearance for the Zimbabwe national team, scoring nine goals. His debut for Zimbabwe came on 11 April 1981, in a 1–0 defeat to Zambia during 1982 African Cup of Nations qualification, while his final appearance came on 13 August 1989, in a 1–0 defeat to the Ivory Coast in 1990 FIFA World Cup qualification.

During the early 1990s, he left Zimbabwe to start coaching teams in Swaziland, including Eleven Men in Flight.

== Playing style ==
Ndunduma was described by former Black Rhinos assistant manager Ashton Nyazika as "the Zimbabwean equivalent to the former Stoke City and England international superstar, Sir Stanley Matthews".

== Personal life and death ==
During the early dawn of 2 November 1994, while driving on the highway from Manzini to Siteki, he died in a car accident at the age of 31.

Ndunduma had two brothers, who both played football. His older brother, Leon, played as a midfielder for Black Aces, while his other brother, David, played as a forward for Black Rhinos.

== Career statistics ==
Scores and results list Zimbabwe's goal tally first, score column indicates score after each Ndunduma goal.

List of international goals scored by Mercedes Sibanda
No.	Date	Venue	Opponent	Score	Result	Competition
1	29 May 1983	Estádio da Machava, Maputo, Mozambique	Mozambique	1–0	1–0	1984 Summer Olympics qualifiers
2	4 November 1984	Lobamba, Swaziland	Swaziland	?	5–1	1986 African Cup of Nations qualification
3	24 March 1985	Rufaro Stadium, Harare, Zimbabwe	Madagascar	?	5–2	1986 African Cup of Nations qualification
4	18 August 1985	Rufaro Stadium, Harare, Zimbabwe	Senegal	1–0	1–0	1986 African Cup of Nations qualification
5	12 April 1987	Rufaro Stadium, Harare, Zimbabwe	Mozambique	1–1	3–2	1988 African Cup of Nations qualification
6	5 July 1987	Rufaro Stadium, Harare, Zimbabwe	Kenya	1–0	1–1	1988 African Cup of Nations qualification
7	14 November 1988	Blantyre, Malawi	Ethiopia	?	2–1	1988 CECAFA Cup
8	9 April 1989	Curepipe, Mauritius	Mauritius	1–0	4–1	1990 African Cup of Nations qualification
9	25 June 1989	National Stadium, Harare, Zimbabwe	Algeria	1–2	1–2	1990 FIFA World Cup qualification

== Honours ==
=== Player ===
CAPS United

- Cup of Zimbabwe: 1980, 1981, 1982, 1983

Black Rhinos

- Zimbabwe Premier Soccer League: 1984, 1987

Zimbabwe

- CECAFA Cup: 1985; runners-up: 1983, 1987

Individual

- Soccer Star of the Year: 1981, 1985

=== Manager ===
Eleven Men in Flight

- Swazi Cup: 1993
- Premier League of Eswatini: 1994
