= Chidzambwa =

Chidzambwa is a Zimbabwean surname. Notable people with the surname include:

- Sunday Chidzambwa, a Zimbabwean footballer and football coach
- Misheck Chidzambwa, a Zimbabwean footballer and manager
