= Lawrence Waya =

Football player and manager

Personal information
- Date of birth: 25 May 1963 (age 63)
- Place of birth: Mphonde, Phalombe District, Nyasaland
- Position: Forward

Senior career*
Years	Team	Apps	(Gls)
1980–	Bata Bullets		
- Al Jazira
–1997	Silver Strikers		

International career
1982–1996	Malawi	129	(28)

Managerial career
- Big Bullets
- * Club domestic league appearances and goals

Lawrence Waya (born 25 May 1963) is a Malawian former football player and manager. A forward, he represented the Malawi national team at international level.

== Club career ==
Born in the village of Mphonde in Phalombe District, Nyasaland, Waya joined local club Bata Bullets in 1980. He spent most of his career with Bullets, but had a brief spell in the United Arab Emirates with Al Jazira Club, and finished his career with Silver Strikers.

== International career ==
Waya made over 100 appearances for the Malawi national team, including seven FIFA World Cup qualifying matches. He won a bronze medal with Malawi at the 1987 All-Africa Games in Nairobi.

== Managerial career ==
After retiring from playing, Waya took coaching courses in the United Kingdom and received a UEFA 'B' Licence. He would then return to Malawi to manage Big Bullets.

== Career statistics ==
Scores and results list Malawi's goal tally first, score column indicates score after each Waya goal.

List of international goals scored by Lawrence Waya
No.	Date	Venue	Opponent	Score	Result	Competition	Ref.
1	13 November 1982	Kampala, Uganda	Uganda	–	1–2	1982 CECAFA Cup	
2	6 July 1984	Blantyre, Malawi	Kenya	–	2–1	Friendly	
3	28 July 1984	Civo Stadium, Lilongwe, Malawi	Mauritius	3–0	4–0	1986 FIFA World Cup qualification	
4	2 December 1984	Mbale Municipal Stadium, Mbale, Uganda	Kenya	–	2–1	1984 CECAFA Cup	
5	12 December 1984	Mbale Municipal Stadium, Mbale, Uganda	Uganda	–	2–0	1984 CECAFA Cup	
6	23 March 1985	Ndola, Zambia	Zambia	–	1–1	Friendly	
7	25 March 1985	Lusaka, Zambia	Zambia	–	2–2	Friendly	
8	30 March 1985	Lilongwe, Malawi	Mozambique	–	1–1	1986 African Cup of Nations qualification	
9	2 May 1985	Rufaro Stadium, Harare, Zimbabwe	Zimbabwe	–	3–1	Friendly	
10	2 May 1985	Rufaro Stadium, Harare, Zimbabwe	Zimbabwe	–	3–1	Friendly	
11	4 January 1987	Somhlolo National Stadium, Lobamba, Eswatini	Swaziland	–	3–1	1987 All-Africa Games qualification	
12	18 January 1987	Lilongwe, Malawi	Swaziland	3–1	6–1	1987 All-Africa Games qualification	
13	18 January 1987	Lilongwe, Malawi	Swaziland	4–1	6–1	1987 All-Africa Games qualification	
14	14 June 1987	Blantyre, Malawi	Zimbabwe	–	2–1	Friendly	
15	27 June 1987	Civo Stadium, Lilongwe, Malawi	Cameroon	1–1	1–1	1988 Summer Olympics qualification	
16	6 July 1987	Kamuzu Stadium, Blantyre, Malawi	Burundi	–	1–1	Friendly	
17	4 August 1987	Moi International Sports Centre, Kasarani, Kenya	Senegal	1–0	2–0	1987 All-Africa Games	
18	4 August 1987	Moi International Sports Centre, Kasarani, Kenya	Senegal	2–0	2–0	1987 All-Africa Games	
19	12 August 1987	Moi International Sports Centre, Kasarani, Kenya	Cameroon	1–0	3–1	1987 All-Africa Games	
20	12 August 1987	Moi International Sports Centre, Kasarani, Kenya	Cameroon	3–1	3–1	1987 All-Africa Games	
21	2 December 1987	El Menzah Stadium, Tunis, Tunisia	Tunisia	–	3–2	Friendly	
22	13 December 1987	Asmara, Eritrea	Zimbabwe	–	1–1	1987 CECAFA Cup	
23	30 July 1988	Civo Stadium, Lilongwe, Malawi	Uganda	3–1	3–1	1990 FIFA World Cup qualification	
24	2 September 1988	Lusaka, Zambia	Zambia	–	1–7	Friendly	
25	6 July 1990	Kamuzu Stadium, Blantyre, Malawi	Tanzania	2–0	2–0	Friendly	
26	22 November 1992	CCM Kirumba Stadium, Mwanza, Tanzania	Ethiopia	1–0	2–1	1992 CECAFA Cup	
27	24 November 1992	CCM Kirumba Stadium, Mwanza, Tanzania	Zanzibar	3–0	3–1	1992 CECAFA Cup	
28	6 July 1993	Kamuzu Stadium, Blantyre, Malawi	Swaziland	2–0	3–1	Friendly	

== See also ==
- List of men's footballers with 100 or more international caps
