= Wiesław Grabowski =

Polish football coach (1955/1956–2026)

Personal information
- Date of birth: 1955 or 1956
- Place of birth: Poland
- Date of death: 29 July 2026 (aged 70)

Managerial career
- Years: Team
- 1983–1984: Zambia
- Darryn T
- 1995: Zimbabwe U23
- 2002: Zimbabwe

Wiesław Grabowski (1955 or 1956 – 29 July 2026) was a Polish football coach and the owner of Zimbabwean club DT Africa United which plays in the lower divisions of the country. The Pole was most known for identifying a host of Zimbabwean players at a young age who later became stars, such as Gift Muzadzi and Norman Mapeza.

== Coaching career ==
Graduating from the Cologne Coaching School, Grabowski was manager of the Zambia national team from 1983 to 1984, earning a salary of 6500 dollars and came to Zimbabwe as part of a government exchange program in 1985. Once in the country, he was apprised of the living conditions by a Yugoslavian trainer named Lukic, who instructed him not to adjust to it.

=== Zimbabwe national team ===
An assistant of the Poland squad that participated in the 1978 FIFA World Cup, Grabowski took the role of head coach of the Zimbabwe national team in 2002 even though the fans were hoping for Bruce Grobbelaar to take the job. Just after his appointment, he was accused of 'canvassing' for the post and promised to personally broker deals that would benefit the Zimbabwe Football Association. Responding to this, Grabowski claimed he got the job since he was the best applicant, convinced that the media and others were bent on subverting him. Tasked with selecting a roster able to reach the 2004 African Cup of Nations, the trainer named a 21-man squad for a series of training camps, leaving out key player Maxwell Dube because of his corpulence so he needed to lose weight. Despite delaying Grabowski's firing as coach, the Zimbabwe Football Association eventually announced his official sacking in May 2002, abashed by a 2–0 loss to Swaziland in the quarter-final of the 2002 COSAFA Cup.

Grabowski coached the Zimbabwe under-23 team that achieved second place at the 1995 All-Africa Games, claiming the silver medal.

=== Zimbabwe ===
Director of DT Africa United, Grabowski was in a dispute over whether he was preventing player Kelvin Bulaji from joining CAPS United in 2013. Bulaji took his case to the ZIFA Player's Status Committee and appealed to the Footballer's Union of Zimbabwe for assistance.

Bringing foreigners into the Zimbabwe Premier Soccer League for the first time, the highlight of the Polish coach's career in Africa was leading Darryn T to the 1992 Zimbabwe Cup trophy by beating CAPS United 4–0 in the final with a team full of youngsters which showed his paradigm for youth football development of giving young players opportunities to perform.

The former Zambia national team manager has also complained about Zimbabwean football's apparent lack of focus on development.

Grabowski worked with the Prince Edward School in Harare to assist budding football talents find their way into playing it professionally, including footballers from Angola.

Going to China to give coaching training in 2015, he requested asked the Zimbabwe national team to have more fixtures each year and to have more exchange programs for coaches.

== Personal life and death ==
Owning property in Germany and Zimbabwe, Grabowski had two houses in Poland which are located in Zabrze and Wisła. Besides being club owner of DT Africa United, he was a tourism ambassador with his wife Krystyna who is a representative consul from Poland and they were both involved in an eleemosynary institution for autistic children. His residence in Zimbabwe was on Gun Hill Avenue, Harare.

Grabowski died on 29 July 2026, at the age of 70.
