= 1984 CECAFA Cup =

Tournament details
- Host country: Uganda
- Dates: December 1–15
- Teams: 8 (from CECAFA confederations)

Final positions
- Champions: Zambia (1st title)
- Runners-up: Malawi

Tournament statistics
- Matches played: 16
- Goals scored: 37 (2.31 per match)

The 1984 CECAFA Cup was the 12th edition of the tournament. It was held in Uganda, and was won by Zambia. The matches were played between December 1–15.

== Group A ==
Team	Pts	Pld	W	D	L	GF	GA	GD
Zambia	5	3	2	1	0	5	2	+3
Uganda	4	3	1	2	0	6	3	+3
Tanzania	2	3	0	2	1	4	5	–1
Zimbabwe	1	3	0	1	2	3	8	–5

December 1, 1984

Uganda	1–1	Tanzania

December 2, 1984

Zambia	2–0	Zimbabwe

December 4, 1984

Uganda	4–1	Zimbabwe

December 5, 1984

Zambia	2–1	Tanzania

December 7, 1984

Uganda	1–1	Zambia

December 8, 1984

Tanzania	2–2	Zimbabwe

== Group B ==
Team	Pts	Pld	W	D	L	GF	GA	GD
Malawi	6	3	3	0	0	4	1	+3
Kenya	3	3	1	1	1	3	3	0
Somalia	3	3	1	1	1	3	3	0
Zanzibar	0	3	0	0	3	1	4	–3

December 2, 1984

Malawi	2–1	Kenya
Waya; Sinalo		Goal

December 3, 1984

Somalia	2–1	Zanzibar

December 6, 1984

Malawi	1–0	Somalia
Sinalo

December 6, 1984

Kenya	1–0	Zanzibar
Ayoyi

December 8, 1984

Kenya	1–1	Somalia
Ayoyi
Penalties
	5–4

Before the match, Malawi has secured qualification, and Zanzibar has already been eliminated. After Kenya made a draw with Somalia, they were tied; so they went into penalty shootout to determine the remaining qualification slot.

December 9, 1984

Malawi	1–0	Zanzibar
Waya

== Semi-finals ==
December 12, 1984

Malawi	2–0 (a.e.t.)	Uganda
Waya; Thewe

Mbale

December 12, 1984

Zambia	2–0	Kenya
Mulala

Kampala

== Third place match ==
December 15, 1984

Uganda	3–1	Kenya
		Ayoyi

Kampala

== Final ==
December 15, 1984

Zambia	0–0 (a.e.t.)	Malawi
Penalties
	3–0

Kampala
