= 1985 CECAFA Cup =

Tournament details
- Host country: Zimbabwe
- Dates: October 4–13
- Teams: 6 (from CECAFA confederations)

Final positions
- Champions: Zimbabwe (1st title)
- Runners-up: Kenya

Tournament statistics
- Matches played: 10
- Goals scored: 23 (2.3 per match)

The 1985 CECAFA Cup was the 13th edition of the tournament. It was held in Zimbabwe, and was won by Zimbabwe. The matches were played between October 4–13.

== Group A ==
Played in Harare

Team	Pts	Pld	W	D	L	GF	GA	GD
Kenya	3	2	1	1	0	4	3	+1
Zimbabwe	3	2	1	1	0	2	1	+1
Tanzania	0	2	0	0	2	2	4	–2

October 4, 1985

Zimbabwe	1–0	Tanzania

October 6, 1985

Zimbabwe	1–1	Kenya
Goal		Olouch

Harare
October 8, 1985

Kenya	3–2	Tanzania
? ? Mahila 86'		Mogella ?

Harare

== Group B ==
Played in Bulawayo

Team	Pts	Pld	W	D	L	GF	GA	GD
Malawi	3	2	1	1	0	3	2	+1
Uganda	2	2	1	0	1	3	1	+2
Zambia	1	2	0	1	1	2	5	–3

October 4, 1985

Malawi	1–0	Uganda
Msiya

October 6, 1985

Malawi	2–2	Zambia
Chimodzi 3'; Sinalo ?'		Chanda 30', ?'

October 8, 1985

Uganda	3–0	Zambia

== Semi-finals ==
October 11, 1985

Zimbabwe	1–0	Malawi
Tauro 38'

Harare
October 11, 1985

Kenya	0–0 Kenya won on pen.	Uganda

Harare

== Third place match ==
October 12, 1985

Malawi	3–1	Uganda
Chimodzi; Sinalo; Kayira		Goal

Bulawayo

== Final ==
October 13, 1985

Zimbabwe	2–0	Kenya
Tauro 70'; Mpariwa 88'

Rufaro Stadium, Harare
Attendance: 32,000
