= Rahman Gumbo =

Zimbabwean footballer (1963–2023)

Personal information
- Full name: Rahman Allen Thuthani Gumbo
- Date of birth: 18 November 1963
- Date of death: 10 November 2023 (aged 59)
- Place of death: Francistown, Botswana
- Position: Midfielder

Senior career*
Years	Team	Apps	(Gls)
1987–1995	Highlanders		

International career
1988–1995	Zimbabwe	17	(3)

Managerial career
- 2011–2012: FC Platinum
- 2012: Zimbabwe (caretaker)
- 2014–2016: Gaborone United
- 2017: Chicken Inn
- 2018–2019: Witbank Spurs
- 2019: Zimbabwe (caretaker)
- 2019: Zimbabwe (caretaker)
- 2019–2021: TelOne
- 2021–2022: Sua Flamingos
- 2022: Botswana (caretaker)
- 2023: Moropule Wanderers
- * Club domestic league appearances and goals

Rahman Allen Thuthani Gumbo (18 November 1963 – 10 November 2023) was a Zimbabwean football player and manager.

== Career ==
Gumbo was initially appointed to the managerial position of Zimbabwe in 2005, but was sacked following a 3–0 loss against Nigeria.

On 8 February 2012, he was appointed manager of the Zimbabwe national team for a second time.

On 8 March 2014, he was appointed manager of Botswana Premier League club Gaborone United.

On 10 May 2016, Gumbo was appointed manager of Zimbabwe Premier League club Chicken Inn. He took up his post as manager on 1 July 2016.

On 28 September 2018, Gumbo was sent on "forced special leave" by his South African National First Division side Witbank Spurs due to poor results that has seen the ambitious outfit registering just a single win in five league starts.

In June 2019, Gumbo, who at the time was the assistant manager, took charge of the Zimbabwean national team for the semi-final against Zambia. This was necessitated by coach Sunday Chidzambwa's return to Zimbabwe after he was granted compassionate leave following the death of his father.

== Death ==
Rahman Gumbo died from a heart attack at a hospital in Francistown, on 10 November 2023, at the age of 59.
