= 1982 CECAFA Cup =

Tournament details
- Host country: Uganda
- Dates: November 13–27
- Teams: 7 (from CECAFA confederations)

Final positions
- Champions: Kenya (3rd title)
- Runners-up: Uganda

Tournament statistics
- Matches played: 13
- Goals scored: 31 (2.38 per match)

The 1982 CECAFA Cup was the 10th edition of the tournament. It was held in Uganda, and was won by Kenya. The matches were played between November 13–27.

== Group A ==
Team	Pts	Pld	W	D	L	GF	GA	GD
Uganda	5	3	2	1	0	4	2	+2
Zimbabwe	4	3	1	2	0	5	2	+3
Malawi	3	3	1	1	1	4	3	+1
Tanzania	0	3	0	0	3	0	6	–6

November 13, 1982

Uganda	2–1	Malawi
Goal		Waya

November 14, 1982

Tanzania	0–3	Zimbabwe

November 16, 1982

Zimbabwe	1–1	Malawi
Goal		Dandize

November 17, 1982

Uganda	1–0	Tanzania

November 19, 1982

Malawi	2–0	Tanzania
Billie; Dandize

November 20, 1982

Uganda	1–1	Zimbabwe

== Group B ==
Team	Pts	Pld	W	D	L	GF	GA	GD
Kenya	3	2	1	1	0	4	2	+2
Zanzibar	3	2	1	1	0	3	2	+1
Sudan	0	2	0	0	2	0	3	–3

November 14, 1982

Kenya	2–0	Sudan
Adero; Ayoyi

November 18, 1982

Zanzibar	1–0	Sudan

November 21, 1982

Kenya	2–2	Zanzibar
Mulamba; Ogolla

== Semi-finals ==
November 24, 1982

Uganda	3–0	Zanzibar

November 24, 1982

Kenya	2–1	Zimbabwe
Mahila; Masinga		F. Phiri

Kampala

== Third place match ==
November 26, 1982

Zimbabwe	3–0	Zanzibar

== Final ==
November 27, 1982

Kenya	1–1	Uganda
Mulamba		Goal
Penalties
	5–3

Attendance: 30,000
