= Knowledge Musona =

Zimbabwean footballer (born 1990)

Personal information
- Date of birth: 21 June 1990 (age 36)
- Place of birth: Norton, Zimbabwe
- Height: 1.74 m (5 ft 9 in)
- Positions: Left winger; forward

Team information
- Current team: Scottland

Youth career
- 2005–2006: Manyame FC
- 2006–2007: Haka United
- 2007–2009: Aces Youth Soccer Academy

Senior career*
Years	Team	Apps	(Gls)
2009–2011	Kaizer Chiefs	49	(19)
2011–2014	1899 Hoffenheim	16	(0)
2012–2013	→ Augsburg (loan)	14	(0)
2013–2014	→ Kaizer Chiefs (loan)	19	(8)
2015–2018	Oostende	104	(35)
2018–2021	Anderlecht	8	(1)
2019	→ Lokeren (loan)	6	(1)
2020–2021	→ Eupen (loan)	31	(9)
2021–2023	Al-Tai	53	(14)
2023–2024	Al-Riyadh	22	(4)
2024–2025	Al-Okhdood	30	(5)
2025–	Scottland		

International career^{‡}
2010–	Zimbabwe	59	(26)
- * Club domestic league appearances and goals as of 18:28, 24 February 2025 (UTC) ‡ National team caps and goals as of 26 December 2025

Knowledge Musona (born 21 June 1990) is a Zimbabwean professional footballer who plays as a left winger or forward for Scottland. Musona, also captained the Zimbabwe national team prior to retiring from international football. Previously, he has played senior football in South Africa, Belgium and Germany.

== Personal life ==
Knowledge Musona hails from Norton, Mashonaland West and attended Lord Malvern High School in Harare. His younger brother Walter Musona is also a professional footballer.

== Club career ==
Musona began his senior career with South African club Kaizer Chiefs, where he scored in Chief's victory in the final of the 2009 Telkom Knockout.

Musona made his debut for Hoffenheim as a substitute against SC Freiburg in a 3–1 win and scored his first goal in a 2–1 DFB-Pokal win over Köln on 25 October 2011. On 18 May 2012, it was announced that he would join Augsburg on a one-year loan for the upcoming season.

In July 2013, he left Germany and returned to Kaizer Chiefs on a loan deal. He scored eight goals in 19 league matches, including a vital goal which sent his team into the last 16 of the Nedbank Cup. Musona scored a hat trick in a 3–0 first-round, second-leg CAF Champions League victory over Liga Muculmana in Maputo on 6 March, progressing to the next round of the competition on a 7–0 aggregate scoreline after winning 4–0 at Moses Mabhida Stadium. Musona suffered an ankle sprain in a 2–0 win over AS Vita Club in the CAF Champions League on 29 March 2014 where they lost 3–2 on aggregate. Musona ended the season with 16 goals in 25 starts in all competitions. He attracted interest from clubs in Belgium, Germany and Roda of the Netherlands. On 5 August, Musona started training with La Liga club, Granada.

On 18 December 2014, Musona signed for Belgian club Oostende, effective 1 January 2015, with the player signing a two-and-a-half-year contract for an undisclosed fee. His agent Paschalis Tountouris stated that this move was the ideal step to revive his career. He joined Andile Jali at the Belgian club. He made his Belgian Pro League debut on 17 January 2015 in a 7–1 home defeat to K.V. Kortrijk. He was subbed off in the 67th minute, being replaced by Fernando Canesin. He scored his first competitive goal for the club on 21 February 2015 in a 3–1 home defeat to Charleroi in the league. His goal, assisted by Elimane Coulibaly, was scored in the 77th minute.

In May 2018, Musona moved to RSC Anderlecht, signing a four-year deal. This came after reported interest from another Belgian side, Standard Liège. He made his league debut for the club on the opening day of the season, coming on for Landry Dimata in the 86th minute of Anderlecht's 4–1 away victory over K.V. Kortrijk. He scored his first competitive goal for the club on 26 August 2018 in a 2–1 away defeat to Club Brugge. His goal, assisted by Ivan Santini, was scored in the 19th minute and levelled the scores at one.

In January 2019, Musona was loaned out to Lokeren until the end of the 2018–19 season. He made his league debut for the club on 19 January 2019, playing all ninety minutes of a 4–1 away defeat to Eupen. He scored his first league goal for the club on 9 February 2019 in a 2–1 home victory over Royal Antwerp. His goal, assisted by Marko Mirić, was scored in the 32nd minute.

On 4 June 2023, Musona joined Saudi Arabian club Al-Riyadh on a free transfer. On 11 August 2024, Musona joined Al-Okhdood on a free transfer.

On 28 July 2025, Musona joined Scottland. In October 2026, he was drafted as player-coach following Scottland's dismissal of Norman Mapeza.

== International career ==
Musona made his national team debut in a friendly against South Africa on 3 March 2010. He is often considered to be one of the finest strikers to ever come out of Zimbabwe. At the 2017 African Cup of Nations, he scored a goal against Tunisia, beating two defenders and smashing the ball beyond the goalkeeper. On 11 June 2017, he scored a hat trick to join other Zimbabwean hat trick heroes like the legendary Peter Ndlovu and Vitalis Takawira. Musona announced his retirement from international football in 2022.

On 11 December 2025, Musona was called up to the Zimbabwe squad for the 2025 Africa Cup of Nations.

== Career statistics ==
=== Club ===
As of match played 3 October 2024

Appearances and goals by club, season and competition
Club	Season	League			National cup (Note: Includes DFB-Pokal, Nedbank Cup, Belgian Cup, King Cup)		League cup (Note: Includes Carling Knockout Cup)		Continental		Other		Total	
Club	Season	Division	Apps	Goals	Apps	Goals	Apps	Goals	Apps	Goals	Apps	Goals	Apps	Goals
Kaizer Chiefs	2009–10	South African Premiership	21	4	0	0	0	0	—		—		21	4
Kaizer Chiefs	2010–11	South African Premiership	28	15	0	0	0	0	—		—		28	15
Kaizer Chiefs	Total		49	19	0	0	0	0	—		—		49	19
1899 Hoffenheim	2011–12	Bundesliga	16	0	1	1	—		—		0	0	17	1
FC Augsburg (loan)	2012–13	Bundesliga	14	0	3	1	—		—		0	0	17	1
Kaizer Chiefs (loan)	2013–14	South African Premiership	19	8	1	1	3	2	3 (Note: Appearances in CAF Champions League)	5	3 (Note: Appearances in MTN 8)	0	29	16
Oostende	2014–15	Belgian Pro League	15	5	0	0	—		—		—		15	5
Oostende	2015–16	Belgian Pro League	35	13	1	0	—		—		—		36	13
Oostende	2016–17	Belgian Pro League	29	10	3	3	—		—		1 (Note: Appearance in Belgian Pro League Europa League play-offs)	0	33	13
Oostende	2017–18	Belgian Pro League	24	7	2	2	—		2 (Note: Appearances in UEFA Europa League)	1	—		28	10
Oostende	Total		103	35	6	5	—		2	1	1	0	122	41
Anderlecht	2018–19	Belgian Pro League	8	1	0	0	—		2	0	—		10	1
Lokeren	2018–19	Belgian Pro League	6	1	0	0	—		–		–		6	1
Eupen	2019–20	Belgian Pro League	7	2	0	0	–		–		–		7	2
Eupen	2020–21	Belgian Pro League	24	7	2	0	–		–		–		26	7
Eupen	Total		31	9	2	0	–		–		–		33	9
Al-Tai	2021–22	Saudi Pro League	24	6	1	0	—		—		—		25	6
Al-Tai	2022–23	Saudi Pro League	29	8	1	1	—		—		—		30	9
Al-Tai	Total		53	14	2	1	—		—		—		55	15
Al-Riyadh	2023–24	Saudi Pro League	22	4	1	0	—		—		—		23	4
Al-Okhdood	2024–25	Saudi Pro League	5	2	0	0	—		—		—		5	2
Career total			326	93	16	9	3	2	7	6	4	0	356	110

=== International ===
As of match played 26 December 2025

Appearances and goals by national team and year
National team	Year	Apps	Goals
Zimbabwe	2010	6	2
Zimbabwe	2011	3	5
Zimbabwe	2012	5	2
Zimbabwe	2013	4	3
Zimbabwe	2014	1	0
Zimbabwe	2015	2	1
Zimbabwe	2016	5	3
Zimbabwe	2017	4	4
Zimbabwe	2018	3	1
Zimbabwe	2019	9	1
Zimbabwe	2020	2	1
Zimbabwe	2021	5	1
Zimbabwe	2022	3	1
Zimbabwe	2025	6	2
Total		58	27

Scores and results list Zimbabwe's goal tally first, score column indicates score after each Musona goal.

List of international goals scored by Knowledge Musona
No.	Date	Venue	Opponent	Score	Result	Competition	Ref.
1	5 September 2010	SKD Stadium, Paynesville, Liberia	Liberia	1–0	1–1	2012 African Cup of Nations qualification	
2	17 November 2010	Estádio da Machava, Maputo, Mozambique	Mozambique	1–0	3–1	Friendly	
3	5 June 2011	Rufaro Stadium, Harare, Zimbabwe	Mali	1–0	2–1	2012 African Cup of Nations qualification	
4	5 June 2011	Rufaro Stadium, Harare, Zimbabwe	Mali	2–1	2–1	2012 African Cup of Nations qualification	
5	8 October 2011	Estádio da Várzea, Praia, Cape Verde	Cape Verde	1–2	1–2	2012 African Cup of Nations qualification	
6	15 November 2011	Rufaro Stadium, Harare, Zimbabwe	South Africa	1–1	2–1	Friendly	
7	15 November 2011	Rufaro Stadium, Harare, Zimbabwe	South Africa	2–1	2–1	Friendly	
8	29 February 2012	Intwari Stadium, Bujumbura, Burundi	Burundi	1–1	1–2	2013 Africa Cup of Nations qualification	
9	17 June 2012	National Stadium, Harare, Zimbabwe	Burundi	1–0	1–0	2013 Africa Cup of Nations qualification	
10	26 March 2013	Borg El Arab Stadium, Amreya, Egypt	Egypt	1–1	1–2	2014 FIFA World Cup qualification	
11	9 June 2013	National Stadium, Harare, Zimbabwe	Egypt	1–1	2–4	2014 FIFA World Cup qualification	
12	10 September 2013	Orlando Stadium, Johannesburg, South Africa	South Africa	1–0	2–1	Friendly	
13	6 September 2015	Rufaro Stadium, Harare, Zimbabwe	Guinea	1–1	1–1	2017 Africa Cup of Nations qualification	
14	28 March 2016	National Stadium, Harare, Zimbabwe	Eswatini	1–0	4–0	2017 Africa Cup of Nations qualification	
15	5 June 2016	National Stadium, Harare, Zimbabwe	Malawi	1–0	3–0	2017 Africa Cup of Nations qualification	
16	13 November 2016	National Stadium, Harare, Zimbabwe	Tanzania	1–0	3–0	Friendly	
17	13 January 2017	Stade d'Angondjé, Libreville, Gabon	Tunisia	1–3	2–4	2017 Africa Cup of Nations	
18	11 June 2017	National Stadium, Harare, Zimbabwe	Liberia	1–0	3–0	2019 Africa Cup of Nations qualification	
19	11 June 2017	National Stadium, Harare, Zimbabwe	Liberia	2–0	3–0	2019 Africa Cup of Nations qualification	
20	11 June 2017	National Stadium, Harare, Zimbabwe	Liberia	3–0	3–0	2019 Africa Cup of Nations qualification	
21	13 October 2018	Stade des Martyrs, Kinshasa, Democratic Republic of the Congo	DR Congo	2–1	2–1	2019 Africa Cup of Nations qualification	
22	24 March 2019	National Stadium, Harare, Zimbabwe	Congo	2–0	2–0	2019 Africa Cup of Nations qualification	
23	16 November 2020	National Stadium, Harare, Zimbabwe	Algeria	1–2	2–2	2021 Africa Cup of Nations qualification	
24	9 October 2021	Cape Coast Sports Stadium, Cape Coast, Ghana	Ghana	1–1	1–3	2022 FIFA World Cup qualification	
25	18 January 2022	Ahmadou Ahidjo Stadium, Yaoundé, Cameroon	Guinea	1–0	2–1	2021 Africa Cup of Nations	
26	20 March 2025	Moses Mabhida Stadium, Durban, South Africa	Benin	2–2	2–2	2026 FIFA World Cup qualification	
27	26 December 2025	Marrakesh Stadium, Marrakesh, Morocco	Angola	1–1	1–1	2025 Africa Cup of Nations	
