= Abdoulaye Traoré (footballer, born 1967) =

Ivorian footballer

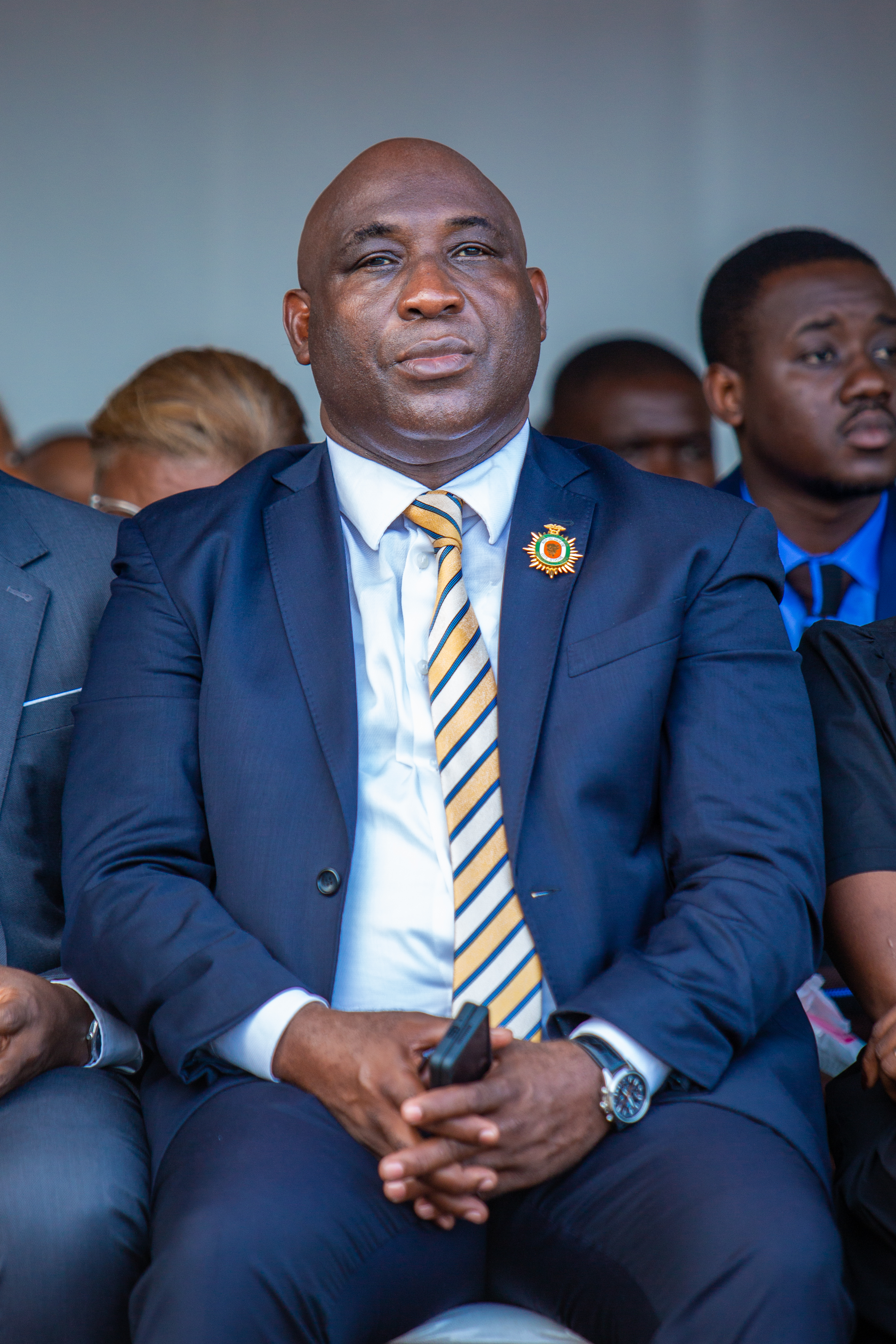
- Traoré in 2023

Personal information
- Date of birth: 4 March 1967 (age 59)
- Place of birth: Abidjan, Ivory Coast
- Height: 1.75 m (5 ft 9 in)
- Position: Forward

Senior career*
Years	Team	Apps	(Gls)
1983–1984	Stella Adjamé	0	(0)
1985–1986	ASEC Mimosas	6	(2)
1986	Braga	6	(0)
1986–1987	Metz B	15	(4)
1987–1988	Sète	19	(5)
1988–1989	Toulon	3	(0)
1989–1990	Avignon	11	(2)
1990–1995	ASEC Mimosas	84	(32)
1995–1997	Al-Orobah	21	(8)
Total		165	(53)

International career
1984–1996	Ivory Coast	90	(49)
- * Club domestic league appearances and goals

Abdoulaye Traoré (born 4 March 1967), nicknamed Ben Badi, is an Ivorian former professional footballer who played as a forward. He scored 49 goals in 90 appearances for the Ivory Coast.

He made six Primeira Liga appearances for Braga.

In 2015, he became an ambassador of The SATUC Cup, a new charitable global football competition for U16 orphans, refugees and disadvantaged children.

== Career statistics ==
=== International ===
Appearances and goals by national team and year
National team	Year	Apps	Goals
Ivory Coast	1984	5	5
Ivory Coast	1985	15	7
Ivory Coast	1986	5	3
Ivory Coast	1987	14	8
Ivory Coast	1988	3	2
Ivory Coast	1989	5	5
Ivory Coast	1990	3	3
Ivory Coast	1991	5	4
Ivory Coast	1992	11	5
Ivory Coast	1993	6	3
Ivory Coast	1994	9	4
Ivory Coast	1995	5	0
Ivory Coast	1996	4	0
Total		90	49

Scores and results list Ivory Coast's goal tally first. The score column indicates the score after each Traoré goal.

List of international goals scored by Abdoulaye Traoré
No.	Date	Venue	Opponent	Score	Result	Competition	Ref.
1	21 October 1984	Felix Houphouet Boigny Stadium, Abidjan, Ivory Coast	Gambia	1-0	4-0	1986 FIFA World Cup qualification	
2	21 October 1984	Felix Houphouet Boigny Stadium, Abidjan, Ivory Coast	Gambia	2-0	4-0	1986 FIFA World Cup qualification	
3	4 November 1984	Independence Stadium, Bakau, Gambia	Gambia	1-1	2-3	1986 FIFA World Cup qualification	
4	28 December 1984	Felix Houphouet Boigny Stadium, Abidjan, Ivory Coast	Tunisia	1-1	3-1	Friendly	
5	28 December 1984	Felix Houphouet Boigny Stadium, Abidjan, Ivory Coast	Tunisia	3-1	3-1	Friendly	
6	20 February 1985	Felix Houphouet Boigny Stadium, Abidjan, Ivory Coast	Congo	—	2-1	Friendly	
7	20 February 1985	Felix Houphouet Boigny Stadium, Abidjan, Ivory Coast	Congo	—	2-1	Friendly	
8	31 March 1985	Felix Houphouet Boigny Stadium, Abidjan, Ivory Coast	Mali	1-0	6-0	1986 African Cup of Nations qualification	
9	31 March 1985	Felix Houphouet Boigny Stadium, Abidjan, Ivory Coast	Mali	4-0	6-0	1986 African Cup of Nations qualification	
10	31 March 1985	Felix Houphouet Boigny Stadium, Abidjan, Ivory Coast	Mali	5-0	6-0	1986 African Cup of Nations qualification	
11	14 April 1985	Bamako, Mali	Mali	1-0	1-1	1986 African Cup of Nations qualification	
12	27 December 1985	Stade Léopold Sédar Senghor, Dakar, Senegal	Guinea	1-0	1-0	1985 CEDEAO Cup	
13	7 March 1986	Cairo International Stadium, Cairo, Egypt	Mozambique	1-0	3-0	1986 African Cup of Nations	
14	7 March 1986	Cairo International Stadium, Cairo, Egypt	Mozambique	2-0	3-0	1986 African Cup of Nations	
15	13 March 1986	Cairo International Stadium, Cairo, Egypt	Senegal	1-0	1-0	1986 African Cup of Nations	
16	18 January 1987	Felix Houphouet Boigny Stadium, Abidjan, Ivory Coast	Nigeria	1-0	1-0	1987 All-Africa Games qualification	
17	29 March 1987	Felix Houphouet Boigny Stadium, Abidjan, Ivory Coast	Congo	—	2-0	1988 African Cup of Nations qualification	
18	5 April 1987	Alphonse Massemba-Débat Stadium, Brazzaville, Republic of Congo	Congo	—	2-1	1988 African Cup of Nations qualification	
19	19 April 1987	Accra Sports Stadium, Accra, Ghana	Ghana	—	2-1	1987 All-Africa Games qualification	
20	19 April 1987	Accra Sports Stadium, Accra, Ghana	Ghana	—	2-1	1987 All-Africa Games qualification	
21	3 July 1987	Lilongwe, Malawi	Malawi	—	2-1	1988 African Cup of Nations qualification	
22	3 July 1987	Lilongwe, Malawi	Malawi	—	2-1	1988 African Cup of Nations qualification	
23	19 July 1987	Felix Houphouet Boigny Stadium, Abidjan, Ivory Coast	Malawi	—	2-0	1988 African Cup of Nations qualification	
24	13 March 1988	Stade Mohammed V, Casablanca, Morocco	Algeria	1-1	1-1	1988 African Cup of Nations	
25	16 March 1988	Stade Mohammed V, Casablanca, Morocco	Zaire	1-1	1-1	1988 African Cup of Nations	
26	23 April 1989	Felix Houphouet Boigny Stadium, Abidjan, Ivory Coast	Angola	—	4-1	1990 African Cup of Nations qualification	
27	23 April 1989	Felix Houphouet Boigny Stadium, Abidjan, Ivory Coast	Angola	—	4-1	1990 African Cup of Nations qualification	
28	16 July 1989	Bamako, Mali	Mali	1-0	2-2	1990 African Cup of Nations qualification	
29	30 July 1989	Felix Houphouet Boigny Stadium, Abidjan, Ivory Coast	Mali	—	3-1	1990 African Cup of Nations qualification	
30	30 July 1989	Felix Houphouet Boigny Stadium, Abidjan, Ivory Coast	Mali	—	3-1	1990 African Cup of Nations qualification	
31	3 March 1990	Stade du 5 Juillet, Algiers, Algeria	Egypt	1-0	3-0	1990 African Cup of Nations	
32	3 March 1990	Stade du 5 Juillet, Algiers, Algeria	Egypt	2-0	3-0	1990 African Cup of Nations	
33	30 September 1990	Stade Général Seyni Kountché, Niamey, Niger	Niger	1-0	1-0	1992 African Cup of Nations qualification	
34	30 April 1991	Felix Houphouet Boigny Stadium, Abidjan, Ivory Coast	Niger	1-0	1-0	1992 African Cup of Nations qualification	
35	28 July 1991	Felix Houphouet Boigny Stadium, Abidjan, Ivory Coast	Morocco	2-0	2-0	1992 African Cup of Nations qualification	
36	2 November 1991	Felix Houphouet Boigny Stadium, Abidjan, Ivory Coast	Senegal	1-0	1-0	1991 CEDEAO Cup	
37	15 December 1991	Felix Houphouet Boigny Stadium, Abidjan, Ivory Coast	Kenya	2-0	4-0	Friendly	
38	13 January 1992	Stade Aline Sitoe Diatta, Ziguinchor, Senegal	Algeria	1-0	3-0	1992 African Cup of Nations	
39	10 October 1992	Felix Houphouet Boigny Stadium, Abidjan, Ivory Coast	Botswana	1-0	6-0	1994 FIFA World Cup qualification	
40	10 October 1992	Felix Houphouet Boigny Stadium, Abidjan, Ivory Coast	Botswana	3-0	6-0	1994 FIFA World Cup qualification	
41	10 October 1992	Felix Houphouet Boigny Stadium, Abidjan, Ivory Coast	Botswana	6-0	6-0	1994 FIFA World Cup qualification	
42	19 October 1992	King Fahd Sports City, Riyadh, Saudi Arabia	United States	1-1	2-5	1992 King Fahd Cup	
43	31 January 1993	Felix Houphouet Boigny Stadium, Abidjan, Ivory Coast	Niger	1-0	1-0	1994 FIFA World Cup qualification	
44	2 May 1993	Felix Houphouet Boigny Stadium, Abidjan, Ivory Coast	Nigeria	1-1	2-1	1994 FIFA World Cup qualification	
45	19 December 1993	Stade Modibo Kéïta, Bamako, Mali	Mali	1-0	1-0	Friendly	
46	29 January 1994	Stade du 4 Août, Ouagadougou, Burkina Faso	Niger	1-0	5-3	Friendly	
47	29 January 1994	Stade du 4 Août, Ouagadougou, Burkina Faso	Niger	2-0	5-3	Friendly	
48	29 January 1994	Stade du 4 Août, Ouagadougou, Burkina Faso	Niger	3-1	5-3	Friendly	
49	3 April 1994	Stade Olympique de Sousse, Sousse, Tunisia	Ghana	2-1	2-1	1994 African Cup of Nations	

== Honours ==
- Ligue 1 (Ivory Coast): 1990, 1991, 1992, 1993, 1994, 1995
- Coupe de Côte d'Ivoire: 1990, 1991
- CAF Champions League runner-up: 1995
- Africa Cup of Nations: 1992; third place: 1986, runner-up 1994
- FIFA Confederations Cup fourth place: 1992

Individual

- Ligue 1 (Ivory Coast) top scorer: 1992, 1994
