= John Phiri (footballer) =

Zimbabwean footballer (born 1962)

Personal information
- Date of birth: 3 May 1962 (age 64)
- Place of birth: Southern Rhodesia
- Height: 1.78 m (5 ft 10 in)
- Position: Defender

Senior career*
Years	Team	Apps	(Gls)
1979–1982	Rio Tinto		
1983–1986	State House Tornados		
1987–1989	Dynamos		
1990–1993	Darryn T		
1993–1994	Sokół Pniewy	24	(0)
1994–1995	Warta Poznań	4	(0)
1996–1997	Ajax Cape Town		

International career
- Zimbabwe
- * Club domestic league appearances and goals

John "JP" Phiri (born 3 May 1962) is a Zimbabwean retired footballer.

== Early life ==
Born on 3 May 1962, John Phiri is the son of former Rhodesia striker July Phiri.

He first played with foremost local team, Rio Tinto FC Under-13s (renamed Eiffel Flats in the mid-70s).

== Football career ==
Phiri was coached at Rio Tinto by Peter Phiri (c.1938 – 23 March 2023).

He also played for Mangula, as well as State House Tornadoes (1983), and Darryn Textiles in Zimbabwe, before heading to Europe. He missed a chance to sign for English side Nottingham Forest, and signed for Polish side Miliarder Pniewy in 1993 instead, along with Norman Mapeza.

He first played for the national team in 1982, against Malawi and after that played regularly until the 1990s. Official figures recorded 94 matches, four less than Coventry City star Peter Ndlovu, but he believes he played a lot more.

His last team was the Cape Town Spurs in South Africa, from 1995 to 1997.

== After retirement ==
After retirement from football, Phiri worked at his business in Budiriro, Harare, but it struggled in the face of the economic downturn of the country around 2000, and moved into printing.

In 2014 he was appointed a board member at the Zimbabwe Football Association, concentrating on development.

== Personal life ==
He has two sons.
