= Paschalis Tountouris =

Greek football agent (born 1978)

Paschalis Tountouris (born 25 April 1978) is a Greek FIFA-licensed football agent and the founder of Prosport, the leading football representation agency in Greece for six consecutive years (2021–2026). Founded in 2004, Prosport has concluded more than 350 international transfers across over 30 countries. In February 2026, Prosport was acquired by AS1 Sports, the international football representation firm backed by U.S. private equity firm Bruin Capital, with Tountouris becoming a partner and shareholder of AS1 while continuing to lead the agency's Greek operations.

Tountouris represents internationally established players including Greek internationals Konstantinos Tsimikas, Anastasios Douvikas and Konstantinos Koulierakis. He has previously represented former Greek captain Giorgos Karagounis, South African internationals Andile Jali and Bernard Parker, Zimbabwean captain Knowledge Musona, and manager Giannis Anastasiou.

== Early career ==
Tountouris began his career in international football as the Head of World Football Division of Prosport International, the South African agency run by agent Mike Makaab. During his tenure he negotiated the transfers to Europe of several international players, including Knowledge Musona, Jabu Pule, Collins Mbesuma, Bernard Parker, Nasief Morris and Jonathan Mensah. In 2004 he founded Prosport in Greece, which he subsequently developed into the country's leading football representation agency.

== Anti-racism activity ==
On 14 April 2008, Tountouris organised a conference at the Athens Metropolitan Hotel to mobilise Greek society in the fight against racism in football. Politicians, journalists and sports figures attended the day-long event, including the then-President of the Hellenic Football Federation Sofoklis Pilavios, international footballers Manucho, Nasief Morris and Simão Mate Junior, South African Olympic medallist Elana Meyer, Apostolos Tzitzikostas and Yannis Moralis, among others.

== Tsimikas transfer to Liverpool F.C. ==
In August 2020, Tountouris concluded what was reported as the most prestigious transfer of a Greek player at the time, with the signing of Konstantinos Tsimikas to Liverpool F.C. from Olympiacos for a fee reported at approximately €17 million.

== Acquisition of Prosport by AS1 (Bruin Capital) ==
On 6 February 2026, AS1 Sports — the international football representation agency launched in December 2024 by U.S. private equity firm Bruin Capital — announced the acquisition of Prosport as part of its global expansion plan in the professional football market. The deal was widely reported in the Greek financial and sports press as a landmark transaction for the country's sports representation industry, marking the first integration of a leading Greek football agency into a top-ten global representation platform.

AS1 was launched in December 2024 through Bruin Capital's consolidation of four agencies — Nomi Sports, Position Number, Promoesport and Football Division Worldwide — at a reported combined valuation of approximately $310 million, with Ignacio Aguillo as chief executive officer and Bruin founder George Pyne as chairman. Headquartered in London with offices across Spain, Portugal and the United Arab Emirates, AS1 represents more than 300 players of over 35 nationalities competing across more than 30 professional leagues, including Bruno Fernandes, Luis Díaz, Piero Hincapié and Nuno Mendes.

Following the integration, Tountouris became a partner and shareholder of AS1, retaining responsibility for the agency's operations in Greece while contributing to its broader European recruitment and commercial strategy. Commenting on the deal, Tountouris described the integration as "a strategic step for Prosport" supporting its long-term growth plan, while AS1 CEO Ignacio Aguillo characterised it as reinforcing the agency's vision of building a global network grounded in trust, excellence and holistic talent management.

== Politics ==
In May 2023, Tountouris was elected as a councillor for the Municipality of Thessaloniki. On 25 September 2019 he had previously been appointed deputy chairman of the National Sports Centres of Thessaloniki (E.A.K.).
