= 1983 CECAFA Cup =

Tournament details
- Host country: Kenya
- Dates: November 12–26
- Teams: 9 (from CECAFA confederations)

Final positions
- Champions: Kenya (4th title)
- Runners-up: Zimbabwe

Tournament statistics
- Matches played: 20
- Goals scored: 42 (2.1 per match)

The 1983 CECAFA Cup was the 11th edition of the tournament. It was held in Kenya, and was won by the hosts Kenya. The matches were played between November 12–26.

== Group A ==
Team	Pts	Pld	W	D	L	GF	GA	GD
Kenya	7	4	3	1	0	5	1	+4
Uganda	5	4	2	1	1	6	5	+1
Sudan	4	4	2	0	2	4	3	+1
Tanzania	3	4	0	3	1	2	3	–1
Ethiopia	1	4	0	1	3	2	7	–5

November 12, 1983

Kenya	2–1	Uganda
Mulamba ?

November 13, 1983

Tanzania	1–1	Ethiopia

November 14, 1983

Uganda	2–1	Sudan
		Mustafa

November 15, 1983

Kenya	2–0	Ethiopia
Ayoyi ?

November 16, 1983

Tanzania	0–1	Sudan
		Mustafa

November 17, 1983

Uganda	2–1	Ethiopia

November 18, 1983

Kenya	0–0	Tanzania

November 19, 1983

Sudan	2–0	Ethiopia
Mustafa

November 20, 1983

Uganda	1–1	Tanzania

November 21, 1983

Kenya	1–0	Sudan
Mulamba

== Group B ==
Team	Pts	Pld	W	D	L	GF	GA	GD
Zimbabwe	6	3	3	0	0	5	2	+3
Malawi	4	3	2	0	1	5	3	+2
Somalia	1	3	0	1	2	3	5	–2
Zanzibar	1	3	0	1	2	3	6	–3

November 13, 1983

Zimbabwe	1–0	Malawi

November 14, 1983

Zanzibar	1–1	Somalia

November 16, 1983

Zimbabwe	2–1	Zanzibar

November 17, 1983

Malawi	2–1	Somalia
Chimodzi ?		Goal

November 19, 1983

Zimbabwe	2–1	Somalia

November 20, 1983

Malawi	3–1	Zanzibar
Chamangwana; Msiya ?		Goal

== Semi-finals ==
November 23, 1983

Kenya	2–0	Malawi
Mulamba; Ayoyi

November 23, 1983

Zimbabwe	1–0	Uganda

== Third place match ==
November 25, 1983

Uganda	2–1	Malawi
Goal		Sinalo ?

== Final ==
November 26, 1983

Kenya	1–0	Zimbabwe
Masinga

Nairobi
Attendance: 30,000
