= 2026 Four Nations Football Tournament =

International football tournament

Tournament details
- Host country: Botswana
- City: Francistown
- Dates: 28–31 March 2026
- Teams: 4 (from 1 confederation)
- Venue: 1 (in 1 host city)

Final positions
- Champions: Zimbabwe
- Runners-up: Zambia
- Third place: Botswana
- Fourth place: Malawi

Tournament statistics
- Matches played: 4
- Goals scored: 5 (1.25 per match)
- Top scorer: 4 players (1 goal)

The 2026 Four Nations Football Tournament (known as the Mukuru Four Nations Tournament for sponsorship reasons) was an international association football friendly tournament organised by the Botswana Football Association (BFA). It took place from 28 to 31 March 2026 at the Obed Itani Chilume Stadium in Francistown

Zimbabwe won the tournament by defeating Zambia 1–0 in the final. Host Botswana finished third after beating Malawi, also 1–0, in the third-place play-off.

== Venue ==
All matches were held at the Obed Itani Chilume Stadium in Francistown, Botswana.

Francistown	Francistown is located in Botswana
Obed Itani Chilume Stadium	Francistown is located in Botswana
Capacity: 26,000	Francistown is located in Botswana

== Participatings teams ==
The three founding members of the tournament—Malawi, Zambia, and Zimbabwe—participated in the tournament alongside guests and hosts Botswana. Zambia fielded an alternate team made up of local-based players and some young members of their Olympic squad, as their first team was scheduled to play a friendly match against Argentina during the same FIFA international match window.

FIFA ranking as of 19 January 2026.

Team	FIFA Ranking	CAF Ranking
Botswana (Hosts)	144	43
Malawi	126	35
Zambia	91	19
Zimbabwe	132	37

== Results ==
The tournament was played on a single-elimination format consisting of semifinals, a third-place match, and a final. Because Zambia fielded an alternate team, the matches in which they participated are not considered international “A” matches and therefore do not count toward the FIFA rankings.

=== Bracket ===
The semifinal matchups were determined by a draw held on March 24.

Semi-finals
28 March
Zambia	0 (9)
Malawi	0 (8)
28 March
Botswana	0
Zimbabwe	3

Final
31 March
Zambia	0
Zimbabwe	1
Third place
31 March
Malawi	0
Botswana	1

=== Semi-finals ===
28 March 2026
15:00

Zambia	0–0	Malawi
	Report
Penalties
	9–8	(penalty missed) Mpinganjira; (penalty missed) Kondowe

Obed Itani Chilume Stadium, Francistown, Botsuana
Referee: Keabetswe Dintwa (Botswana)

28 March 2026
18:00

Botswana	0–3	Zimbabwe
	Report	Tshuma 24'; Bonne 33'; Antonio 45'

Obed Itani Chilume Stadium, Francistown, Botsuana
Referee: Chanshi Kasongo (Zambia)

=== Third place playoff ===
31 March 2026
15:00

Malawi	0–1	Botswana
	Report	Moloi 66'

Obed Itani Chilume Stadium, Francistown
Referee: Owen Manenda (Zimbabwe)

=== Final ===
31 March 2026
18:00

Zambia	0–1	Zimbabwe
	Report	Saisada 88' (o.g.)

Obed Itani Chilume Stadium, Francistown
Referee: Moemedi Thabologang (Botswana)

== Statistics ==
=== Goalscorers ===
There have been 5 goals scored in 4 matches, for an average of 1.25 goals per match.

1 goal

- (Botswana) Kamogelo Moloi
- (Zimbabwe) Bill Antonio
- (Zimbabwe) Macauley Bonne
- (Zimbabwe) Mongameli Tshuma

1 own goal

- (Zambia) Kafuti Saisada (against Zimbabwe)
