= Klaus-Dieter Pagels =

German football coach

Personal information
- Date of birth: 1 September 1949
- Place of birth: Stade, Germany

Managerial career
- Years: Team
- 1991–199?: VfL Stade
- 2012–2013: Zimbabwe
- 2016: Emirates Club

Klaus-Dieter Pagels (born 1 September 1949 in Germany) is a German football coach.

== Career ==
On a Germany-Zimbabwe government project, Pagels went to Zimbabwe in 2009 to educate schoolchildren and develop grassroots as well as women's football.

Nominated to take the position of Zimbabwe coach in 2009, Pagels was named as interim of the Warriors near the close of 2012 with his appointment seen as ludicrous to some. Tasked with bringing Zimbabwe to the 2014 FIFA World Cup, putting a confident mentality into the team and making most of the talent in the country, he planned on selecting a mainly local-based squad for the World Cup qualifying but only chose five for the 18-man roster for their qualifier away to Egypt amid work permit problems, Going down 1-2 to Egypt, the German employed a technical style of play similar to Barcelona's tiki-taka style, where possession is highlighted and the offensives build up from the back to the front line. However, he was criticized for not calling up the most talented Zimbabwean footballers and crashed out to Egypt again 2-4 in their second leg a few months later, becoming the only African selection to go down on back-to-back home rounds. At the 2013 COSAFA Cup, his last tournament, the then 63-year old aimed to defend the tournament title but let in goals in all three games and conceded 0-2 to Zambia in the final, with failing to read the opposition one of the causes for his poor run. His contract expiring on July 31 that year, the Stade local stated that low finances are one of the greatest problems with Zimbabwean football and that he regretted his departure since the new manager would have to start from scratch with the team.
