= Wilson Mutekede =

Zimbabwean football manager

Wilson Mutekede is a Zimbabwean football manager who last managed the Zimbabwe national football team.

== Early life ==
Mutekede obtained a Coaching and Management diploma from the Zimbabwe National University of Science and Technology.

== Career ==
Mutekde holds a CAF A License. In 2017, he was appointed manager of the Zimbabwe national football team. After that, he was appointed technical director of the Zimbabwe national football team. He has also worked as a CAF managerial license instructor. Mutekede has been blamed by some Zimbabwean managers for not making it easier to obtain CAF managerial licenses.
