= Misheck Chidzambwa =

Zimbabwean footballer and manager (died 2021)

Personal information
- Date of birth: 1954/1955
- Date of death: 24 June 2021 (aged 66)
- Position: Defender

Senior career*
Years	Team	Apps	(Gls)
- Dynamos
2017	Universals		

International career
1982–1987	Zimbabwe		

Managerial career
- 1993: Tanganda
- Chapungu United
- 2000: Zimbabwe
- Sporting Lions
- 2011: Blue Ribbon
- 2017: Universals
- * Club domestic league appearances and goals

Misheck Chidzambwa (née Marimo; 1954/1955 – 24 June 2021) was a Zimbabwean football player and manager.

== Early and personal life ==
His older brother Sunday was also a footballer. Their original surname was Marimo.

== Playing career ==
Chidzambwa played as a defender for Dynamos. He served as captain of the national team, captaining them to the Cecafa Senior Challenge Cup in 1985. He combined his football career with working for the police. He retired in 1987 due to injury.

== Coaching career ==
Chidzambwa was on Clemens Westerhof's coaching staff when he was manager of the Zimbabwe national team. He succeeded Westerhof as manager in 2000, winning the Cosafa Cup. He also managed club sides Tanganda, Chapungu United, Sporting Lions and Blue Ribbon. With Tanganda he won the Castle Cup in 1993. He was fired by Blue Ribbon in 2011, and left football. In February 2017 he said he wanted to return to football. Later that year he returned to coaching at Universals, also occasionally playing for the club.

== Later life and death ==
He died on 24 June 2021, aged 66. He had been unwell since May 2020.
