= Abbas Magongo =

Kenyan Footballer

Abbas Hamisi Magongo a.k.a. Zamalek was a Tanzanian-born Kenyan footballer who played for club sides Young Africans and Gor Mahia FC, and Kenya.

== Career ==
He turned out for Gor Mahia between 1984 and 1991 before moving to Oman's Al-Seeb Club. He was part of the Kenyan squad that fetured in the 1990 Africa Cup of Nations.

He died on 29 January 2001 in Malindi.
