= Abdoulaye Kaloga =

Malian footballer

Abdoulaye Kaloga (born 19 December 1959) is a Malian former professional footballer who played as a midfielder.

== Career ==
Kaloga was a left-footed central midfielder. He spent most of his playing career with Stade Malien, and finished his career with S.C. Covilhã in the Primeira Divisão.

Kaloga played for the Mali national team, scoring the winning goal in a 1986 African Cup of Nations qualifier against Benin on 18 November 1984. He also played in an unofficial Mali international squad in 1989.
