= 1987 CECAFA Cup =

Tournament details
- Host country: Ethiopia
- Dates: December 13–27
- Teams: 7 (from CECAFA confederations)

Final positions
- Champions: Ethiopia (1st title)
- Runners-up: Zimbabwe

Tournament statistics
- Matches played: 13
- Goals scored: 26 (2 per match)

The 1987 CECAFA Cup was the 14th edition of the tournament. It was held in Ethiopia, and was won by the hosts. The matches were played between December 13–27.

== Group A ==
| Team | Pts | Pld | W | D | L | GF | GA | GD |
|---|---|---|---|---|---|---|---|---|
| Zanzibar | 4 | 3 | 1 | 2 | 0 | 2 | 0 | +2 |
| Ethiopia | 4 | 3 | 1 | 2 | 0 | 2 | 1 | +1 |
| Kenya | 3 | 3 | 1 | 1 | 1 | 4 | 4 | 0 |
| Tanzania | 1 | 3 | 0 | 1 | 2 | 2 | 5 | –3 |

December 13, 1987

| Ethiopia | 0–0 | Tanzania |

December 14, 1987

| Kenya | 0–0 | Zanzibar |

December 16, 1987

| Kenya | 3–2 | Tanzania |
|---|---|---|
| Motego ? ? |

December 17, 1987

| Ethiopia | 0–0 | Zanzibar |

December 19, 1987

| Zanzibar | 2–0 | Tanzania |

December 20, 1987

| Ethiopia | 2–1 | Kenya |
|---|---|---|
| | | Mulamba |

== Group B ==
| Team | Pts | Pld | W | D | L | GF | GA | GD |
|---|---|---|---|---|---|---|---|---|
| Uganda | 3 | 2 | 1 | 1 | 0 | 4 | 0 | +4 |
| Zimbabwe | 2 | 2 | 0 | 2 | 0 | 2 | 2 | 0 |
| Zambia | 1 | 2 | 0 | 1 | 1 | 2 | 6 | –4 |
| Malawi | Withdrew | | | | | | | |

After competing one match, Malawi withdrew following the sudden death of the chairman of the FA of Malawi on December 13.

December 13, 1987

| Malawi | 1–1 | Zimbabwe |
|---|---|---|
| Waya | | Goal |

December 14, 1987

| Uganda | 4–0 | Zambia |

December 16, 1987

| Uganda | 0–0 | Zimbabwe |

December 19, 1987

| Zambia | 2–2 | Zimbabwe |

== Semi-finals ==
December 23, 1987

| Zimbabwe | 1–0 | Zanzibar |

December 24, 1987

| Ethiopia | 3–0 | Uganda |

== Third place match ==
December 26, 1987

| Uganda | 2–0 | Zanzibar |

== Final ==
December 27, 1987

| Ethiopia | 1–1 (a.e.t.) | Zimbabwe |
Penalties
| | 4–3 |
