= Tawanda Chirewa =

Zimbabwean footballer (born 2003)

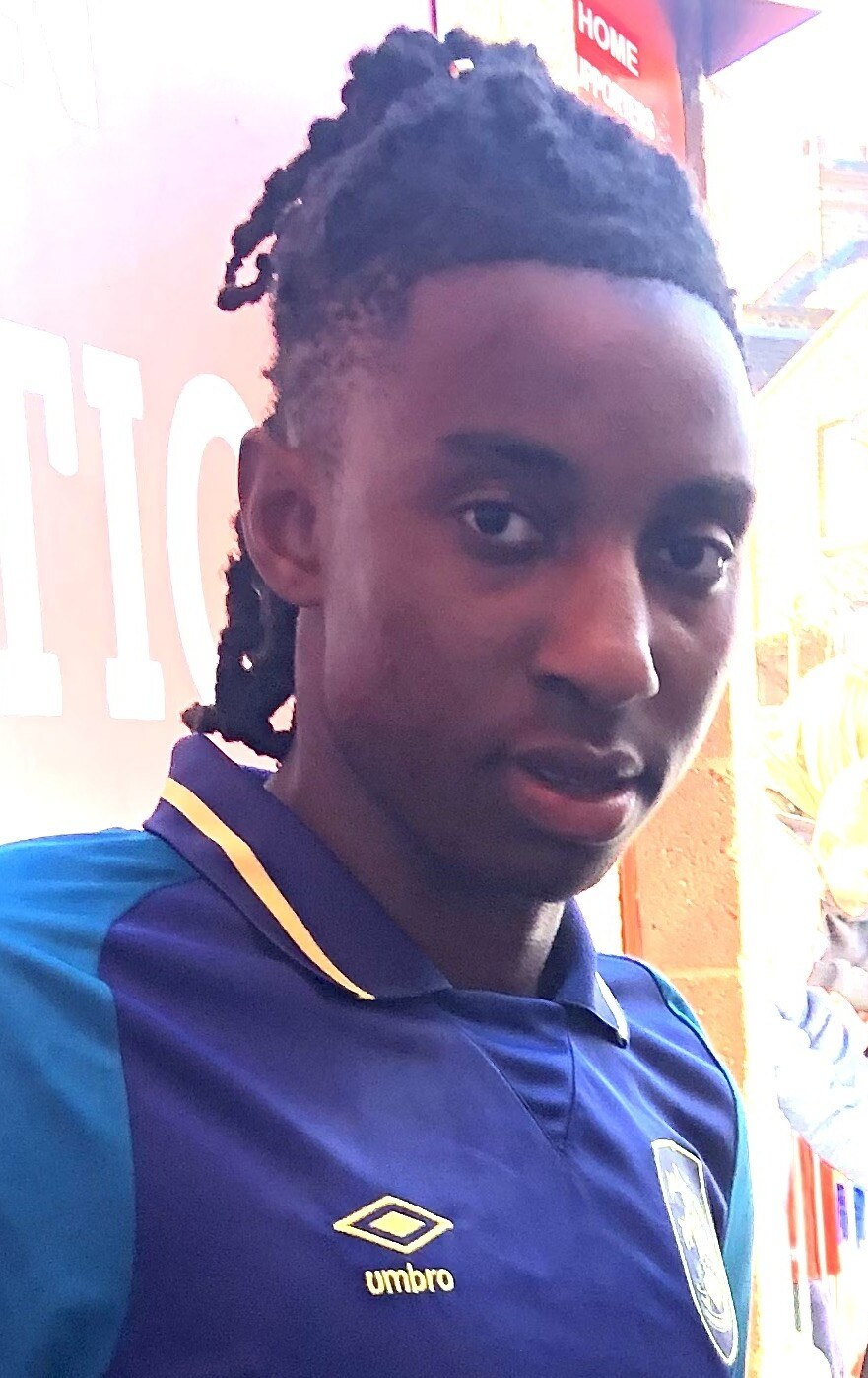
- Chirewa with Huddersfield Town in 2025

Personal information
- Full name: Tawanda Blessing Chirewa
- Date of birth: 12 October 2003 (age 23)
- Place of birth: Chelmsford, England
- Height: 1.81 m (5 ft 11 in)
- Position: Right winger

Team information
- Current team: Wolverhampton Wanderers
- Number: 23

Youth career
- –2019: Ipswich Town

Senior career*
Years	Team	Apps	(Gls)
2019–2023	Ipswich Town	0	(0)
2023–	Wolverhampton Wanderers	10	(1)
2024–2025	→ Derby County (loan)	5	(0)
2025	→ Huddersfield Town (loan)	13	(0)
2026	→ Barnsley (loan)	1	(0)

International career^{‡}
2024–	Zimbabwe	20	(5)
- * Club domestic league appearances and goals as of 10:45, 2 February 2026 (UTC) ‡ National team caps and goals as of 18:00, 16 November 2026 (UTC)

Tawanda Blessing Chirewa (born 12 October 2003) is a professional footballer who plays as a right winger for EFL Championship club Wolverhampton Wanderers. Born in England, he represents Zimbabwe internationally.

== Club career ==
=== Ipswich Town ===
Chirewa made his debut for Ipswich Town on 12 November 2019, appearing as a second-half substitute in a 1–0 away loss to Colchester United in an EFL Trophy group stage match, he became the second youngest player to make his first-team debut for the club, after Connor Wickham, at 16 years and 31 days old. On 14 July 2020, it was announced that Chirewa had signed a two-year scholarship with Ipswich.

He signed his first professional contract with Ipswich on 2 November 2020, signing a deal until 2022, with the option of an additional year extension.

=== Wolverhampton Wanderers ===
On 18 September 2023, Chirewa signed for Premier League club Wolverhampton Wanderers, joining the club's Under-21s side.

Chirewa made his debut Wolves First XI appearance, as a second-half substitute, in the FA Cup away to Brentford on 5 January 2024.

Chirewa made his Premier League debut, as a second-half substitute, in a 0–0 draw away to Brighton & Hove Albion on 22 January 2024.

Chirewa made his first appearance in a Black Country derby in the Fourth Round of the F.A. Cup, in a 2–0 victory against West Bromwich Albion at The Hawthorns on 28 January 2024. His appearance came as a second-half substitute after crowd unrest breaking out in sections of the ground designated for West Brom supporters led the game to be suspended for half an hour.

On 26 August 2024, Chirewa signed on loan with Derby County until the end of the season. Chirewa made his debut a day later in the EFL Cup at Barrow. A concussion sustained on international duty would rule him of two games in September. Chirewa made his first start for Derby County at Sunderland on 1 October 2024. After this match, he sustained a "freak" quad injury which is expected to rule him out of action for four to eight weeks. After making only six appearances for Derby, Chirewa's loan was ended early after Derby activated an option to end the loan on 13 January 2025.

On 3 February 2025, Chirewa signed with League One club Huddersfield Town on loan until the end of the season.

On 30 January 2026, Chirewa returned to League One on loan, this time joining Barnsley until the end of the season.

== International career ==
In March 2024, Chirewa was called up by the Zimbabwe national team.

Chirewa made his debut for Zimbabwe on 7 June 2024 in a World Cup qualifier against Lesotho at the Orlando Stadium in Johannesburg, South Africa. He started the game and played 68 minutes, as Lesotho won the game 2–0. He scored his first international goal in the next game four days later, a 3–1 loss to South Africa.

On 11 December 2025, Chirewa was called up to the Zimbabwe squad for the 2025 Africa Cup of Nations.

== Personal life ==
Born in England, Chirewa is of Zimbabwean descent.

== Career statistics ==
=== Club ===
As of match played 1 February 2026

Appearances and goals by club, season and competition
Club	Season	League			FA Cup		EFL Cup		Other		Total	
Club	Season	Division	Apps	Goals	Apps	Goals	Apps	Goals	Apps	Goals	Apps	Goals
Ipswich Town	2019–20	League One	0	0	0	0	0	0	1 (Note: Appearance in EFL Trophy)	0	1	0
Ipswich Town	2020–21	League One	0	0	0	0	0	0	0	0	0	0
Ipswich Town	2021–22	League One	0	0	0	0	0	0	0	0	0	0
Ipswich Town	2022–23	League One	0	0	1	0	0	0	1	0	2	0
Ipswich Town	Total		0	0	1	0	0	0	2	0	3	0
Wolverhampton Wanderers	2023–24	Premier League	8	0	2	0	0	0	—		10	0
Wolverhampton Wanderers	2024–25	Premier League	0	0	—		—		—		0	0
Wolverhampton Wanderers	2025–26	Premier League	2	0	0	0	0	0	—		2	0
Wolverhampton Wanderers	Total		9	0	2	0	0	0	0	0	11	0
Derby County (loan)	2024–25	Championship	5	0	0	0	1	0	—		6	0
Huddersfield Town (loan)	2024–25	League One	13	0	—		—		—		13	0
Career total			28	0	3	0	1	0	2	0	34	0

=== International ===
As of match played 16 November 2026

Appearances and goals by national team and year
National team	Year	Apps	Goals
Zimbabwe	2024	4	1
Zimbabwe	2025	10	2
Zimbabwe	2026	6	2
Total		20	5

Scores and results list Zimbabwe's goal tally first.

List of international goals scored by Tawanda Chirewa
No.	Date	Venue	Opponent	Score	Result	Competition
1.	11 June 2024	Free State Stadium, Bloemfontein, South Africa	South Africa	1–1	1–3	2026 FIFA World Cup qualification
2.	25 March 2025	Godswill Akpabio International Stadium, Uyo, Nigeria	Nigeria	1–1	1–1	2026 FIFA World Cup qualification
3.	13 November 2025	Prince Abdullah Al-Faisal Sports City Stadium, Jeddah, Saudi Arabia	Algeria	1–3	1–3	Friendly
4.	24 September 2026	Ben M'Hamed El Abdi Stadium, El Jadida, Morocco	Sierra Leone	2–2	3–2	2027 Africa Cup of Nations qualification
5.	16 November 2026	National Sports Stadium, Harare, Zimbabwe	Equatorial Guinea	2–0	3–0	2027 Africa Cup of Nations qualification
