= Bill Antonio =

Zimbabwean footballer (born 2002)

Personal information
- Full name: Bill Leeroy Antonio
- Date of birth: 3 September 2002 (age 24)
- Place of birth: Dzivarasekwa, Zimbabwe
- Height: 1.77 m (5 ft 10 in)
- Position: Winger

Team information
- Current team: Mechelen
- Number: 29

Youth career
- –2020: Prince Edward School

Senior career*
Years	Team	Apps	(Gls)
2020–2022	Dynamos		
2022–2025	Jong KVM	33	(10)
2023–	Mechelen	60	(5)

International career^{‡}
2021–	Zimbabwe	9	(1)
- * Club domestic league appearances and goals as of 31 May 2026 ‡ National team caps and goals as of 18:59, 17 November 2025 (UTC)

Bill Leeroy Antonio (born 3 September 2002) is a Zimbabwean professional footballer who plays as a winger for Belgian club Mechelen, and the Zimbabwe national team.

== Club career ==
For the 2023-24 Belgian season, Antonio started in Mechelen's second team in Belgian Division 2, Jong KV. He made his professional debut for Mechelen as a substitute in a 3-0 Mechelen win over Standard Liege on 5 November 2023, and continued to make appearances off the bench for the Malinwa, scoring the winner in a 2–1 win at Gent on 19 January 2024, the club's first away win over the Buffalos since 2012.

== International career ==
Antonio made his international debut with the Zimbabwe national team as an 18-year-old in a 1–0 2022 FIFA World Cup qualification loss to South Africa on 11 November 2021. It was his first call-up.

Antonio was named in the Zimbabwe squad for the 2021 Africa Cup of Nations, but along with Panashe Mutimbanyoka and Temptation Chiwunga did not travel to Cameroon due to organisational problems.

On 11 December 2025, Antonio was called up to the Zimbabwe squad for the 2025 Africa Cup of Nations.

=== International goals ===
Scored a goal against Saudi Arabia, in an international friendly match in November 2025

List of international goals scored by Bill Antonio
No.	Date	Venue	Cap	Opponent	Score	Result	Competition
1	17 November 2025	Abdullah bin Khalifa Stadium, Doha, Qatar	9	Qatar	1–1	2–1	Friendly
