= Shacky Tauro =

Zimbabwean footballer and manager (1959-2009)

Personal information
- Full name: Shackman Tauro
- Date of birth: 28 June 1959
- Place of birth: Rhodesia
- Date of death: 17 June 2009 (aged 49)
- Place of death: Zimbabwe
- Position: Striker

Senior career*
Years	Team	Apps	(Gls)
1972–1991	CAPS United		

International career
1980–1988	Zimbabwe		

Managerial career
- 1991–1994: CAPS United (assistant)
- 1994–1996: Blackpool
- 1996–1997: Arcadia United
- 1997–1998: CAPS United
- 1998: Circle United
- ????: Zimbabwe Women
- 2006–2007: CAPS United
- 2007–2009: Shooting Stars
- * Club domestic league appearances and goals

Shackman "Shacky" Tauro (28 June 1959 – 17 June 2009) was a Zimbabwean football player and coach.

== Career ==
=== Playing career ===
Tauro, who played as a striker, spent his entire professional career with CAPS United, and also earned international caps for Zimbabwe.

He was named the Rhodesian Soccer Star of the Year in 1979.

=== Coaching career ===
Tauro coached Blackpool, Arcadia United, CAPS United, Circle United, the Zimbabwe women's national team, and Shooting Stars.
