= Sunday Chidzambwa =

Zimbabwean footballer and manager (born 1952)

Personal information
- Full name: Sunday Marimo Chidzambwa
- Date of birth: 4 May 1952 (age 74)
- Place of birth: Enkeldoorn, Southern Rhodesia
- Position: Defender

Senior career*
Years	Team	Apps	(Gls)
- Dynamos

International career
- Zimbabwe

Managerial career
- Dynamos
- 2003–2004: Zimbabwe
- 2004: Umtata Bush Bucks
- 2007: Zimbabwe
- 2008–2010: Zimbabwe
- 2010: Free State Stars
- 2010–2012: Black Leopards
- 2017–2019: Zimbabwe
- * Club domestic league appearances and goals

Sunday Marimo Chidzambwa is a Zimbabwean association football coach and former player.

== Early and personal life ==
He was born in Enkeldoorn. He is nicknamed "Mhofu" in Zimbabwe. His younger brother Misheck was also a Zimbabwean international player who later became a coach.

== Career ==
Marimo played as a defender for Dynamos, with whom he won five league championships.

He also played at international level for Zimbabwe, appearing in a FIFA World Cup qualifying match in 1980.

After retiring as a player, he went on to manage Dynamos, the Zimbabwe national team (in 2004 at the 2004 African Cup of Nations and 2007), and South African team Umtata Bush Bucks, where he was unable to take up the position because he lost his passport; he was replaced by Clemens Westerhof. He was re-appointed manager of Zimbabwe in November 2008, leaving in May 2010 to manage South Africa's Free State Stars. Marimo quit Free State Stars in August 2010, later becoming manager of Black Leopards. On 20 October 2012 was banned by the FIFA and ZIFA for match fixing the next 10 years. He was appointed as one of three Zimbabwe national team coaches in July 2017. He resigned in July 2019.
