= Sallieu Tarawallie =

Sierra Leonean footballer

Personal information
- Full name: Sallieu Capay Tarawallie
- Date of birth: 3 January 1995 (age 31)
- Place of birth: Sewafe, Sierra Leone
- Height: 1.77 m (5 ft 9 1/2 in)
- Positions: Left back; center back

Team information
- Current team: FC Kallon

Senior career*
Years	Team	Apps	(Gls)
2015	FC Kallon		
2015–2016	Beitar Tel Aviv Bat Yam	7	(0)
2017	Dila	22	(5)
2018–2019	Mbabane Swallows		
2019	Víkingur Ólafsvík	21	(3)
2020–	FC Kallon		

International career^{‡}
2015–	Sierra Leone	15	(3)
- * Club domestic league appearances and goals ‡ National team caps and goals as of 24 September 2026

Sallieu Capay Tarawallie (born 3 January 1995) is a Sierra Leonean footballer who plays as a winger or forward for FC Kallon. Besides Sierra Leone, he has played in Israel, Georgia, Swaziland, and Iceland.

== Career ==
In 2015, Tarawallie signed for Beitar Tel Aviv Bat Yam in the Israeli second division.

Before the 2017 season, he signed for Georgian side Dila. After that, he signed for Mbabane Swallows in Swaziland.

Before the 2019 season, Tarawallie signed for Icelandic second division club Víkingur Ólafsvík. After that, he signed for FC Kallon in Sierra Leone.

== Career statistics ==
As of 15 May 2021

Appearances and goals by club, season and competition
Club	Season	League			Cup		Total	
Club	Season	Division	Apps	Goals	Apps	Goals	Apps	Goals
Beitar Tel Aviv Bat Yam	2015-16	Liga Leumit	7	0	1|0		8	0
Dila	2017	Erovnuli Liga	22	5	2|0		24	5
Víkingur Ólafsvík	2019	1. deild karla	3	-|-		21	3	
