= Zimbabwe national football team =

Men's association football team

Zimbabwe
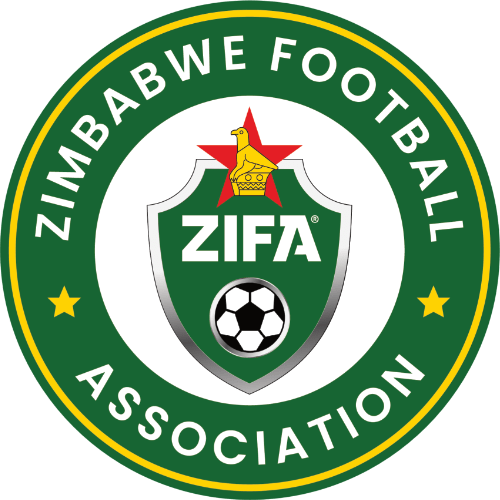
- Nickname: The Warriors
- Association: Zimbabwe Football Association (ZIFA)
- Confederation: CAF (Africa)
- Sub-confederation: COSAFA (Southern Africa)
- Head coach: Ramón Catalá
- Captain: Marvelous Nakamba
- Most caps: Peter Ndlovu (100)
- Top scorer: Peter Ndlovu (37)
- Home stadium: National Sports Stadium
- FIFA code: ZIM
First colours	Second colours	Third colours

FIFA ranking
- Current: 129 ▲1 (7 October 2026)
- Highest: 39 (April 1994)
- Lowest: 131 (October 2009, February–March 2016)

First international
- Southern Rhodesia 0–4 Northern Rhodesia (Southern Rhodesia; Date Unknown, 1946); Post-independence; Rhodesia 1–0 Malawi (Rhodesia; 12 November 1967)

Biggest win
- Botswana 0–7 Zimbabwe (Gaborone, Botswana; 26 August 1990)

Biggest defeat
- South Africa 7–0 Rhodesia (South Africa; 9 April 1977)

Africa Cup of Nations
- Appearances: 6 (first in 2004)
- Best result: Group stage (2004, 2006, 2017, 2019, 2021, 2025)

African Nations Championship
- Appearances: 5 (first in 2009)
- Best result: Fourth place (2014)

COSAFA Cup
- Appearances: 20 (first in 1997)
- Best result: Champions (2000, 2003, 2005, 2009, 2017, 2018)
Medal record
COSAFA Cup
Gold medal – first place	2000 Southern Africa	Team
Gold medal – first place	2003 Southern Africa	Team
Gold medal – first place	2005 Southern Africa	Team
Gold medal – first place	2009 Zimbabwe	Team
Gold medal – first place	2017 South Africa	Team
Gold medal – first place	2018 South Africa	Team
Silver medal – second place	1998 Southern Africa	Team
Silver medal – second place	2001 Southern Africa	Team
Silver medal – second place	2013 Zambia	Team
Bronze medal – third place	2004 Southern Africa	Team
Bronze medal – third place	2006 Southern Africa	Team
Bronze medal – third place	2019 South Africa	Team
CECAFA Cup
Gold medal – first place	1985 Zimbabwe	Team
Silver medal – second place	1983 Kenya	Team
Silver medal – second place	1987 Ethiopia	Team
Bronze medal – third place	1982 Uganda	Team

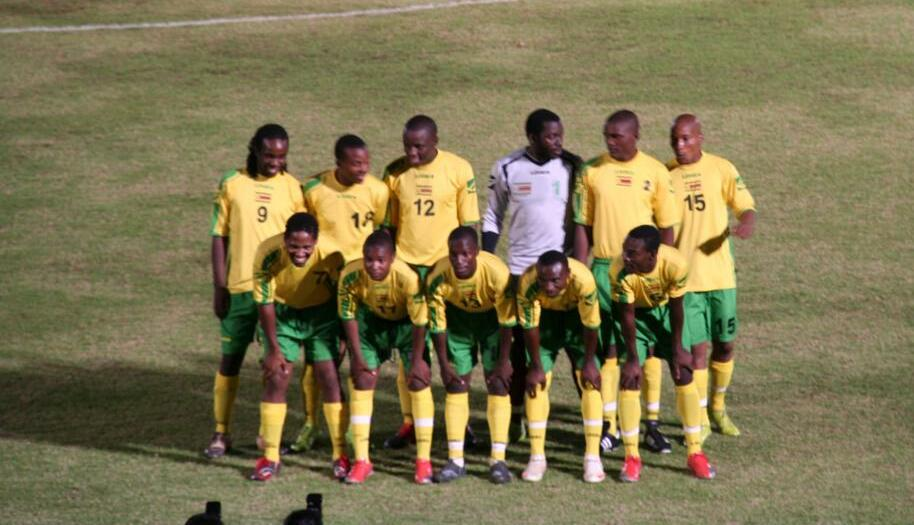
2009 Image of Zimbabwe national football team

The Zimbabwe national football team (Shona: Chikwata chenhabvu chenyika yeZimbabwe), nicknamed The Warriors, represents Zimbabwe in men's international football and is controlled by the Zimbabwe Football Association (ZIFA), formerly known as the Football Association of Rhodesia. The team has never qualified for the FIFA World Cup finals, but has qualified for the Africa Cup of Nations six times. Zimbabwe has also won the COSAFA Cup six times. The team represents both FIFA and the Confederation of African Football (CAF).

== History ==
Zimbabwe played their first official match against the England Amateur national football team as part of the latter's tour of South Africa and Rhodesia in June 1929. Zimbabwe lost their first two matches against England 4–0 and 6–1, respectively. In 1965, following Southern Rhodesia's Unilateral Declaration of Independence as Rhodesia, FIFA requested that the Football Association of Rhodesia reform to be a multi-racial organisation. Prior to this, only white Rhodesians were selected for the national football team but after 1965 the team became multi-racial. In 1969, Rhodesia took part in the Oceanic 1970 FIFA World Cup qualification tournament. This was their first attempt to qualify for the FIFA World Cup. Contrary to the team being viewed as the representative team of white Rhodesians, the team was multi-racial including black players. They were drawn against the Australia national football team. Both legs were held in Lourenço Marques, Portuguese Mozambique as the Rhodesian team were unable to get Australian visas. Rhodesia drew the first leg 1–1 but lost the second leg 3–1 thus eliminating Rhodesia from qualification.

In 1980, following the country's reconstitution as Zimbabwe, they played their first FIFA World Cup qualifying match for 11 years against the Cameroon national football team. However they lost 2–1 on aggregate after a 1–0 win in the first leg in Salisbury and a 2–0 loss in the second leg. Following this, the country passed a law that people who held British passports would not be permitted to hold a Zimbabwean passport, which mean that players such as goalkeeper Bruce Grobbelaar, who is considered to be Zimbabwe's greatest goalkeeper,were not selected for the national team for 10 years. Following a change in policy that allowed Grobbelaar to play for Zimbabwe, who entered the country on his British passport, Zimbabwe under manager Reinhard Fabisch were one match away from qualifying for the 1994 FIFA World Cup. However, they lost their final qualifying match to Cameroon.

In 2004, Zimbabwe qualified for their first Africa Cup of Nations. During their first match against Egypt, their former anthem "Ishe Komborera Africa" was accidentally played instead of "Simudzai Mureza wedu weZimbabwe", an act which Information Minister Jonathan Moyo called "a cheap attempt by the organisers to demoralise our boys".

In 2015, the Zimbabwe national football team were banned from participating in 2018 FIFA World Cup qualifying due to an unpaid debt to former coach, José Claudinei. At the time, the team was experiencing its strongest period for many years, qualifying for both the 2017 and 2019 Africa Cup of Nations.

On 1 March 2022, Zimbabwe, along with Kenya, was suspended again from international sport due to the interference of the government. Earlier in November 2021, Harare and Nairobi dissolved their federations and were replaced with government-officials. On 31 March, the suspension was made indefinitely and was ratified by FIFA. Suspension is set until Zimbabwe and Kenya meet the demands given by FIFA. The team has produced some of the finest footballers the likes of the legendary Peter Ndlovu who played for Zimbabwe 100 times. He featured in the English premier for Coventry City, Birmingham City, Sheffield United and Huddersfield. Peter Ndlovu is well remembered for the hatrick he scored at Anfield against Liverpool, Bruce Grobelaar former Liverpool Goalkeeper, Norman Mapeza former Galatasary defender, Benjan Mwaruwaru former Man city player. Knowledge Musona former Anderletch and Bundesliga player. Khama Billiat former Mamelodi Sundowns and Kaizer Chiefs player.

== Kit provider ==
Kit provider	Period
(Italy) L-Sporto	2004–2005
(Italy) Legea	2006–2009
(Germany) Puma	2010–2012
(England) Umbro	2013–2014
(Spain) Joma	2015–2016
(Singapore) Mafro	2017–2018
(England) Umbro	2019–2022
(Germany) Puma	2023–2025

== Results and fixtures ==
The following is a list of match results in the last 12 months, as well as any future matches that have been scheduled.

Win Draw Loss Fixture

=== 2025 ===
17 November Friendly	Qatar	1–2	Zimbabwe	Doha, Qatar
19:30 UTC+3	Gouda 9'	Report	Garananga 24'; Antonio 74'	Stadium: Abdullah bin Khalifa Stadium; Referee: Mohamed Ebrahim Saad (Bahrain)

22 December 2025 AFCON Group B	Egypt	2–1	Zimbabwe	Agadir, Morocco
21:00 UTC+1	Marmoush 64'; Salah 90+1'	Report	Dube 20'	Stadium: Adrar Stadium; Referee: Issa Sy (Senegal)

26 December 2025 AFCON Group B	Angola	1–1	Zimbabwe	Marrakesh, Morocco
13:30 UTC+1	Dala 24'	Report	Musona 45+6'	Stadium: Marrakesh Stadium; Referee: Peter Waweru (Kenya)

29 December 2025 AFCON Group B	Zimbabwe	2–3	South Africa	Marrakesh, Morocco
17:00 UTC+1	Maswanhise 19'; Modiba 73' (o.g.)	Report	Moremi 7'; Foster 50'; Appollis 82' (pen.)	Stadium: Marrakesh Stadium; Referee: Mustapha Kech Chaf (Morocco)

=== 2026 ===
28 March 2026 Four Nations Tournament semi-final	Botswana	0–3	Zimbabwe	Francistown, Botswana
18:00 UTC+2		Report	Tshuma 24'; Bonne 33'; Antonio 45'	Stadium: Obed Itani Chilume Stadium; Referee: Chanshi Kasongo (Zambia)

31 March 2026 Four Nations Tournament Final	Zambia	0–1	Zimbabwe	Francistown, Botswana
17:00 UTC+2		Report	Kafunti (o.g.)	Stadium: Obed Itani Chilume Stadium; Referee: Moemedi Thabologang(Botswana)

26 May 2026 Unity Cup	Nigeria	2–0	Zimbabwe	London, England
19:30 UTC+1	Azeez 4', 62'	Report		Stadium: The Valley; Referee: John Brooks (England)

30 May 2026 Unity Cup	Zimbabwe	1–0	India	London, England
14:30 UTC+1	Dube 34' (pen.)	Report		Stadium: The Valley; Referee: Andrew Madley (England)

24 September 2027 AFCON qualification	Sierra Leone	2–3	Zimbabwe	El Jadida, Morocco
19:00 UTC+0	Conteh 7'; Tarawallie 27'	Report	Munetsi 72', 89'; Chirewa 77'	Stadium: Ben M'Hamed El Abdi Stadium; Referee: Lucky Razake Kasalirwe (Uganda)

28 September 2027 AFCON qualification	Zimbabwe	1–2	DR Congo	Harare, Zimbabwe
18:00 UTC+2	Munetsi 90+3'	Report	Wissa 30'; Moutoussamy 45+2'	Stadium: National Sports Stadium; Referee: Amin Omar (Egypt)

12 November 2027 AFCON qualification	Equatorial Guinea	0–0	Zimbabwe	Bata, Equatorial Guinea
18:00 UTC+1		Report		Stadium: Estadio de Bata; Referee: Ahmed Arajiga (Tanzania)

16 November 2027 AFCON qualification	Zimbabwe	3–0	Equatorial Guinea	Harare, Zimbabwe
15:00 UTC+1	Ngwenya 4'; Chirewa 71'; Maswanhise 78'	Report		Stadium: National Sports Stadium; Referee: Teklu Mogos (Eritrea)

=== 2027 ===
24 March 2027 AFCON qualification	Zimbabwe	v	Sierra Leone	TBD, Zimbabwe
TBD				Stadium: TBD

28 March 2027 AFCON qualification	DR Congo	v	Zimbabwe	TBD, DR Congo
TBD				Stadium: TBD

== Coaching history ==
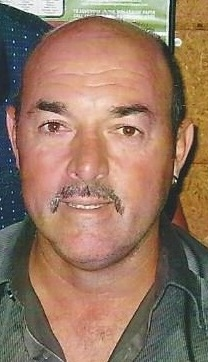
Bruce Grobbelaar played for Zimbabwe and managed Zimbabwe

Caretaker managers are listed in italics.

- (Scotland) Danny McLennan (1965–1969)
- (England) Bill Asprey (1975–1977)
- (Scotland) John Rugg (1980–1981)
- (Zimbabwe) Shepherd Murape (1981–1983)
- (England) Mick Poole (1985)
- (Ghana) Ben Koufie (1988–1992)
- (Germany) Reinhard Fabisch (1992–1995)
- (Germany) Rudi Gutendorf (1995–1996)
- (Zimbabwe) Bruce Grobbelaar (1996)
- (Scotland) Ian Porterfield (1996–1997)
- (Zimbabwe) Sunday Chidzambwa (1997)
- (Zimbabwe) Bruce Grobbelaar (1997)
- (Portugal) Roy Barreto (1997–1998)
- (Zimbabwe) Bruce Grobbelaar (1998)
- (Netherlands) Clemens Westerhof (1998–2000)
- (Zimbabwe) Misheck Chidzambwa (2000)
- (Zimbabwe) Sunday Chidzambwa (2000–2002)
- (Poland) Wiesław Grabowski (2002)
- (Zimbabwe) Sunday Chidzambwa (2003–2004)
- (Zimbabwe) Rahman Gumbo (2004)
- (Zimbabwe) Charles Mhlauri (2004–2007)
- (Zimbabwe) Sunday Chidzambwa (2007)
- (Zimbabwe) Norman Mapeza (2007)
- (Zimbabwe) Luke Masomore (2007–2008)
- (Brazil) José Claudinei (2008)
- (Zimbabwe) Sunday Chidzambwa (2008–2009)
- (Zimbabwe) Norman Mapeza (2009–2010)
- (Belgium) Tom Saintfiet (2010)
- (Zimbabwe) Madinda Ndlovu (2010–2011)
- (Zimbabwe) Norman Mapeza (2011–2012)
- (Zimbabwe) Rahman Gumbo (2012)
- (Germany) Klaus Dieter Pagels (2012–2013)
- (Zimbabwe) Ian Gorowa (2013–2014)
- (Zimbabwe) Callisto Pasuwa (2015–2017)
- (Zimbabwe) Wilson Mutekede (2017)
- (Zimbabwe) Sunday Chidzambwa (2017–2019)
- (Zimbabwe) Joey Antipas (2019–2020)
- (Croatia) Zdravko Logarušić (2020–2021)
- (Zimbabwe) Norman Mapeza (2021–2022)
- (Zimbabwe) Wilson Mutekede (2022)
- (Zimbabwe) Shepherd Murape (2022–2023)
- (Zimbabwe) Sunday Chidzambwa (2023)
- (Brazil) Baltemar Brito (2023–2024)
- (Zimbabwe) Norman Mapeza (2024)
- (Zimbabwe) Jairos Tapera (2024)
- (Germany) Michael Nees (2024–2025)
- (Romania) Mario Marinică (2025–2026)
- (Zimbabwe) Kaitano Tembo (2026–2026)
- (Spain) Ramón Catalá (2026–)

== Players ==
=== Current squad ===
The following players were called-up for the 2027 Africa Cup of Nations qualification Group E matches against Equatorial Guinea on 12 and 16 November 2026.

Caps and goals are correct as of 28 September 2026, after the match against DR Congo.

No.	Pos.	Player	Date of birth (age)	Caps	Goals	Club
	GK	Martin Mapisa	25 May 1998 (age 28)	2	0	(Zimbabwe Football Association) Hardrock
	GK	Nelson Chadya	5 April 1997 (age 29)	1	0	(Zimbabwe Football Association) Scottland
	GK	Future Sibanda	6 July 1996 (age 30)	1	0	(Zimbabwe Football Association) ZPC Kariba
	GK	Aaron Ngwenya		0	0	(Zimbabwe Football Association) Highlanders
	DF	Jordan Zemura	14 November 1999 (age 27)	23	0	(The Football Association) Watford
	DF	Emmanuel Jalai	6 January 1999 (age 27)	18	0	(Zimbabwe Football Association) Scottland
	DF	Peter Muduhwa	11 August 1993 (age 33)	11	0	(Zimbabwe Football Association) Scottland
	DF	Sean Fusire	31 May 2005 (age 21)	8	0	(The Football Association) Sheffield Wednesday
	DF	Shane Maroodza	18 May 2004 (age 22)	6	0	(Football Association of Bosnia and Herzegovina) Sarajevo
	DF	Kelvin Moyo	3 April 1993 (age 33)	6	0	(Zimbabwe Football Association) Scottland
	DF	Corbin Mthunzi	7 May 2007 (age 19)	4	0	(The Football Association) Ipswich Town
	DF	Tinotenda Muringai	28 July 2001 (age 25)	0	0	(Zimbabwe Football Association) Hardrock
	MF	Marvelous Nakamba	19 January 1994 (age 32)	41	0	(Hellenic Football Federation) Panetolikos
	MF	Tawanda Chirewa	11 October 2003 (age 23)	18	4	(The Football Association) Wolverhampton Wanderers
	MF	Andy Rinomhota	21 April 1997 (age 29)	15	0	(The Football Association) Reading
	MF	Jonah Fabisch	13 August 2001 (age 25)	13	0	(South African Football Association) Lamontville Golden Arrows
	MF	Mthokozisi Msebe	17 February 2000 (age 26)	2	0	(Zimbabwe Football Association) Scottland
	MF	Abubakar Moffat	18 January 1998 (age 28)	0	0	(Zimbabwe Football Association) Scottland
	FW	Tino Kadewere	5 January 1996 (age 30)	21	1	(Hellenic Football Federation) Aris Thessaloniki
	FW	Tawanda Maswanhise	20 November 2002 (age 23)	19	2	(Scottish Football Association) Motherwell
	FW	Bill Antonio	3 September 2002 (age 24)	15	2	(Royal Belgian Football Association) Mechelen
	FW	Daniel Msendami	24 October 2000 (age 26)	15	0	(South African Football Association) Marumo Gallants
	FW	Thandolwenkosi Ngwenya	19 December 2002 (age 23)	3	0	(South African Football Association) AmaZulu

=== Recent call-ups ===
The following players have been called up for Zimbabwe in the last 12 months.

Pos.	Player	Date of birth (age)	Caps	Goals	Club	Latest call-up
GK	Elvis Chipezeze	11 March 1990 (age 36)	14	0	(South Africa) Magesi	v. DR Congo, 28 September 2026
GK	Marley Tavaziva	17 December 2004 (age 21)	1	0	Free agent	v. Sierra Leone, 25 September 2026 ^{PRE}
GK	Washington Arubi	29 August 1985 (age 41)	33	0	(South Africa) Marumo Gallants	2025 Africa Cup of Nations
DF	Divine Lunga	28 May 1995 (age 31)	30	0	(South Africa) Mamelodi Sundowns	v. DR Congo, 28 September 2026
DF	Munashe Garananga	18 January 2001 (age 25)	22	1	(Denmark) Lyngby	v. DR Congo, 28 September 2026
DF	Isaac Mabaya	22 September 2004 (age 22)	0	0	(England) Liverpool	v. DR Congo, 28 September 2026
DF	Brendan Galloway	17 March 1996 (age 30)	9	0	Free agent	v. Sierra Leone, 25 September 2026 ^{PRE}
DF	Gerald Takwara	29 October 1994 (age 32)	38	1	(Libya) Al Ittihad	v. India, 30 May 2026
DF	Godknows Murwira	4 July 1993 (age 33)	19	0	(Zimbabwe) Scottland	v. India, 30 May 2026
DF	Isheanesu Mauchi	28 November 2002 (age 23)	4	0	(South Africa) Chippa United	v. India, 30 May 2026
DF	Teenage Hadebe	17 September 1995 (age 31)	33	4	(United States) Cincinnati	2026 Four Nations Tournament
DF	Andrew Mbeba	19 February 2000 (age 26)	5	0	(Zimbabwe) Highlanders	2026 Four Nations Tournament
DF	Alec Mudimu	8 April 1995 (age 31)	26	0	(Wales) Flint Town United	2025 Africa Cup of Nations
MF	Marshall Munetsi	22 June 1996 (age 30)	38	5	(England) Wolverhampton Wanderers	v. DR Congo, 28 September 2026
MF	Prosper Padera	9 October 2006 (age 20)	4	0	(Finland) SJK	v. DR Congo, 28 September 2026
MF	Knowledge Musona	21 June 1990 (age 36)	54	27	(Zimbabwe) Scottland	v. Sierra Leone, 25 September 2026 ^{PRE}
MF	Mongameli Tshuma	22 July 2001 (age 25)	4	1	(Zimbabwe) Highlanders	v. Sierra Leone, 25 September 2026 ^{PRE}
MF	Panashe Makwiramiti	1 July 2002 (age 24)	1	0	(Wales) Haverfordwest County	2026 Four Nations Tournament
MF	Tapuwanashe Chakuchichi	28 November 2003 (age 22)	1	0	(Spain) San Fernando	2025 Africa Cup of Nations
FW	Prince Dube	17 February 1997 (age 29)	12	7	(Zimbabwe) Hardrock	v. DR Congo, 28 September 2026
FW	Leeroy Mavunga	6 December 1998 (age 27)	5	0	(Zimbabwe) Dynamos	v. DR Congo, 28 September 2026
FW	Ishmael Wadi	19 December 1992 (age 33)	7	1	(Zimbabwe) CAPS United	v. Sierra Leone, 25 September 2026 ^{PRE}
FW	Junior Zindoga	28 July 1998 (age 28)	3	0	(South Africa) TS Galaxy	v. Sierra Leone, 25 September 2026 ^{PRE}
FW	Washington Navaya	29 April 1998 (age 28)	5	0	(Zimbabwe) Hardrock	v. India, 30 May 2026
FW	Macauley Bonne	26 October 1995 (age 31)	7	2	(England) Billericay Town	2026 Four Nations Tournament
FW	Walter Musona	12 December 1995 (age 30)	20	4	(Zimbabwe) Scottland	v. Qatar, 16 November 2025
FW	Tymon Machope	3 July 1993 (age 33)	1	0	(Zimbabwe) TelOne	v. Qatar, 16 November 2025
^{DEC} Player refused to join the team after the call-up.^{INJ} Player withdrew from the squad due to an injury.^{PRE} Preliminary squad.^{RET} Player has retired from international football.^{SUS} Suspended from the national team, red or yellow cards.

== Records ==
As of 29 December 2025
Players in bold are still active with Zimbabwe.

=== Most appearances ===
Rank	Player	Caps	Goals	Career
1	Peter Ndlovu	81	37	1990–2007
2	Adam Ndlovu	74	26	1990–2004
3	Francis Shonhayi	70	1	1989–1998
4	John Phiri	67	3	1983–1995
5	**Khama Billiat**	63	18	2011–present
5	Dumisani Mpofu	63	0	1996–2006
7	Japhet Mparutsa	62	0	1981–1995
7	Stanley Ndunduma	62	9	1981–1989
7	Esrom Nyandoro	62	4	2001–2012
10	**Knowledge Musona**	58	27	2010–present

=== Top goalscorers ===
Rank	Player	Goals	Caps	Ratio	Career
1	Peter Ndlovu	37	81	0.46	1991–2007
2	**Knowledge Musona**	27	58	0.47	2010–present
3	Adam Ndlovu	26	74	0.35	1992–2004
4	Agent Sawu	21	47	0.45	1990–2004
5	**Khama Billiat**	18	63	0.29	2011–present
6	Vitalis Takawira	13	40	0.33	1992–1998
7	Shacky Tauro	11	45	0.24	1980–1989
8	Luke Jukulile	10	15	0.67	2000–2001
8	Benjani Mwaruwari	10	44	0.23	1999–2010
10	**Prince Dube**	9	29	0.31	2017–present
10	Cuthbert Malajila	9	31	0.29	2008–2017
10	Stanley Ndunduma	9	62	0.15	1981–1989

== Competitive record ==
=== FIFA World Cup ===
FIFA World Cup record									Qualification record					
Year	Round	Position	Pld	W	D*	L	GF	GA	Pld	W	D	L	GF	GA
1930 to 1962	Part of United Kingdom								Part of United Kingdom					
as Rhodesia									as Rhodesia					
(England) 1966	Did not enter								Did not enter					
(Mexico) 1970	Did not qualify from Asia/Oceania zone								3	0	2	1	2	4
(West Germany) 1974	Did not enter								Did not enter					
(Argentina) 1978	Did not enter								Did not enter					
as Zimbabwe									as Zimbabwe					
(Spain) 1982	Did not qualify from African zone								2	1	0	1	1	2
(Mexico) 1986	Did not qualify from African zone								2	0	1	1	1	2
(Italy) 1990	Did not qualify from African zone								4	0	1	3	1	10
(United States) 1994	Did not qualify from African zone								10	6	2	2	11	10
(France) 1998	Did not qualify from African zone								8	2	2	4	10	10
(South Korea) (Japan) 2002	Did not qualify from African zone								8	6	0	2	11	6
(Germany) 2006	Did not qualify from African zone								12	5	3	4	17	16
(South Africa) 2010	Did not qualify from African zone								6	1	3	2	4	6
(Brazil) 2014	Did not qualify from African zone								6	0	2	4	4	9
(Russia) 2018	Expelled from qualifying competition								Expelled from qualifying competition					
(Qatar) 2022	Did not qualify from African zone								8	1	2	5	5	9
(Canada) (Mexico) (United States) 2026	Did not qualify from African zone								10	0	5	5	5	12
(Morocco) (Portugal) (Spain) 2030	To be determined								To be determined					
(Saudi Arabia) 2034	To be determined								To be determined					
Total	—	0/15	—	—	—	—	—	—	79	22	23	34	72	96

=== Africa Cup of Nations ===
Africa Cup of Nations record
Appearances: 6
Year	Round	Position	Pld	W	D*	L	GF	GA
(Sudan) 1957 to (Nigeria) 1980	Not affiliated to CAF							
(Libya) 1982 to (Mali) 2002	Did not qualify							
(Tunisia) 2004	Group stage	14th	3	1	0	2	6	8
(Egypt) 2006	Group stage	13th	3	1	0	2	2	5
(Ghana) 2008 to (Equatorial Guinea) 2015	Did not qualify							
(Gabon) 2017	Group stage	14th	3	0	1	2	4	8
(Egypt) 2019	Group stage	21st	3	0	1	2	1	6
(Cameroon) 2021	Group stage	17th	3	1	0	2	3	4
(Ivory Coast) 2023	Disqualified due to FIFA suspension							
(Morocco) 2025	Group stage	20th	3	0	1	2	4	6
(Kenya) (Tanzania) (Uganda) 2027	To be determined							
2029	To be determined							
Total	Group stage	6/35	18	3	3	12	20	37

=== African Nations Championship ===
African Nations Championship record
Appearances: 5
Year	Round	Position	Pld	W	D*	L	GF	GA
(Ivory Coast) 2009	Group stage	6th	3	0	3	0	3	3
(Sudan) 2011	Group stage	11th	3	1	0	2	2	3
(South Africa) 2014	Fourth place	4th	6	2	3	1	3	2
(Rwanda) 2016	Group stage	13th	3	0	1	2	1	3
(Morocco) 2018	Did not qualify							
(Cameroon) 2020	Group stage	16th	3	0	0	3	1	5
(Algeria) 2022	Did not qualify							
Total	Fourth place	5/7	18	3	7	8	10	16

=== African Games ===
African Games record
Year	Result	Pld	W	D	L	GF	GA
1965–1987	Did not enter						
1991–present	See Zimbabwe national under-23 football team						
Total	4/4	0	0	0	0	0	0

=== COSAFA Cup ===
- 1997 – Qualifying round
- 1998 – Second place
- 1999 – Quarter-finals
- 2000 – Winners
- 2001 – Second place
- 2002 – Quarter-finals
- 2003 – Winners
- 2004 – Semi-finals
- 2005 – Winners
- 2006 – Semi-finals
- 2007 – First round
- 2008 – Quarter-finals
- 2009 – Winners
- 2010 – Cancelled
- 2013 – Second place
- 2015 – Group stage
- 2016 – Group stage
- 2017 – Winners
- 2018 – Winners
- 2019 – Third place
- 2020 – Cancelled
- 2021 – Group stage

=== CECAFA Cup ===
- 1981 – Group stage
- 1982 – Third place
- 1983 – Second place
- 1984 – Group stage
- 1985 – Winners
- 1987 – Second place
- 1988 – Fourth place
- 1989 – Group stage
- 1990 – Group stage
- 2009 – Quarter-finals
- 2011 – Quarter-finals

== Honours ==
=== Intercontinental ===
- Afro-Asian Games
  - (bronze) Bronze Medal (1): 2003

=== Regional ===
- COSAFA Cup
  - (gold) Champions (6): 2000, 2003, 2005, 2009, 2017, 2018
  - (silver) Runners-up (3): 1998, 2001, 2013
  - (bronze) Third place (1): 2019
- CECAFA Cup
  - (gold) Champions (1): 1985
  - (silver) Runners-up (2): 1983, 1987
  - (bronze) Third place (1): 1982
