= Norman Mapeza =

Zimbabwean footballer and coach (born 1972)

Personal information
- Full name: Norman Takanyariwa Mapeza
- Date of birth: 12 April 1972 (age 54)
- Place of birth: Salisbury, Rhodesia (now Harare, Zimbabwe)
- Height: 1.84 m (6 ft 0 in)
- Position: Defensive midfielder

Youth career
- Red Arrows
- Chitungwiza juniors
- Darryn Textiles

Senior career*
Years	Team	Apps	(Gls)
1991–1993	Darryn Textiles	68	(1)
1993–1994	Sokół Pniewy	26	(0)
1994–1995	Galatasaray	25	(2)
1995–1996	Ankaragücü	31	(2)
1996–1997	Altay	29	(1)
1997–1998	Dardanelspor	30	(2)
1998–1999	Denizlispor	31	(0)
1999–2000	Altay	26	(1)
2000–2001	SV Ried	10	(0)
2001–2002	Malatyaspor	17	(0)
2003–2005	CAPS United	28	(1)
2005–2006	Ajax Cape Town	11	(1)
Total		332	(11)

International career
1993–2001	Zimbabwe	92	(0)

Managerial career
- 2007–2008: Monomotapa United
- 2007: Zimbabwe (caretaker)
- 2009–2010: Zimbabwe (caretaker)
- 2011–2012: Zimbabwe
- 2014–2019: Platinum
- 2017: Zimbabwe (caretaker)
- 2019–2020: Chippa United
- 2020–2021: Platinum
- 2021–2022: Zimbabwe (caretaker)
- 2021–2025: Platinum
- 2024: Zimbabwe (caretaker)
- 2025–2026: Scottland
- * Club domestic league appearances and goals

Norman Takanyariwa Mapeza (born 12 April 1972) is a Zimbabwean football manager and former player. During his career, he played as a defender and midfielder.

== Club career ==
Mapeza began his playing career with Darryn Textiles F.C. in Harare. He moved to Europe to play with Sokół Pniewy in the Polish Ekstraklasa for the 1993–94 season. Mapeza next played for several clubs in the Turkish Super Lig, including Galatasaray S.K., Ankaragücü, Altay S.K. and Malatyaspor.

He was only the second Zimbabwean player to play in the UEFA Champions League, appearing in the competition with Galatasaray in the 1990s.

== Coaching career ==
In the 2003–04 season, Mapeza functioned as a playing assistant coach at CAPS United and later in a similar role for Ajax Cape Town in the 2005–06 season. He ended his playing career in the summer 2006.

In July 2007, Mapeza was appointed manager of Monomotapa United back in Zimbabwe. He resigned from his position later in 2008 . In August and September 2007, Mapeza also took charge of Zimbabwe's national football team on interim basis.

In the beginning of May 2009, Mapeza was appointed caretaker manager of Zimbabwe once again. He resigned in November 2010.

In March 2011, Mapeza was again appointed Zimbabwe manager for a third spell in four years. In February 2012, he was suspended from his job as Zimbabwe's national football team manager for alleged match-fixing.

On 11 August 2014, Mapeza was appointed manager of F.C. Platinum. And in March 2017, Mapeza was also appointed caretaker manager of Zimbabwe for the fourth time until November 2017. Mapeza left his position at Platinum on 12 September 2019 and was appointed the manager of the South African PSL team Chippa United on 1 October 2019. He left Chippa in March 2020.

In November 2020, Mapeza returned to F.C. Platinum as the club's new manager.

On 15 September 2021, Mapeza was appointed caretaker manager of the Zimbabwe's national football team. He became the caretaker manager of Zimbabwe again during March 2024 for the Four Nations Football Tournament where Zimbabwe finished as runners-up.

In December 2025, Mapeza was appointed coach of Scottland following the club's dismissal of title-winning coach . with Wicknell Chivayo purportedly sponsoring the club to the amount of US$1 million. Mapeza was dismissed in October 2026 shortly after Scottland squandered a 2-goal lead in the first leg of their 2026–27 CAF Champions League second round tie with Petro de Luanda, losing 2–3 on aggregate. Scottland had also led the 2026 Zimbabwe Premier Soccer League by nine points at one stage in the season, before falling back and trailing leaders Hardrock by eight points at the time of Mapeza's dismissal.
