= Ambrose Ayoyi =

Kenyan Footballer

Ambrose Golden Boy Ayoyi is a retired Kenyan footballer who was capped 53 times for Kenya between 1980 and 1988, scoring 13 goals.

He turned out for club side Scarlet in Nakuru, and Bandari, and represented Kenya at the 1988 African Cup of Nations in Morocco.
