= Rufaro Stadium =

Stadium in Harare, Zimbabwe

Coordinates: 17°51′13″S 31°02′15″E

- Interactive map of Rufaro Stadium
- Full name: Rufaro Stadium
- Location: Harare
- Capacity: 60,000
- Surface: Grass

Tenants
- CAPS United; Dynamos; Herentals; Scottland

The Rufaro Stadium is a multi-purpose stadium in Harare, Zimbabwe and home to Dynamos F.C. and Harare City F.C. It is currently used mostly for football matches. The stadium has a capacity of 60,000 people.

In 1980, Bob Marley and the Wailers, performed at Rufaro Stadium to celebrate Zimbabwe's newly-achieved independence its ending of a white-majority rule. The stadium hosted Paul Simon for the televised concert at the height of his Graceland tour, where he was joined by Hugh Masekela, Miriam Makeba and Ladysmith Black Mambazo.

FIFA, through its GOAL programme, has sponsored the renovation of the natural grass pitch into an artificial football pitch. This synthetic turf pitch, called Xtreme Turf, has been manufactured and installed by Act Global. The artificial turf was however removed at the end of the 2016 football season due to its deteriorating state. A natural turf has since been installed and the stadium was reopened for use in April 2017.

Extensive renovations were completed in February 2024, with the stadium described as "world-class" and "eye-catching" by Premier Soccer League chairman Farai Jere, with the intention to return international matches to the stadium.

However, as of June 2025, the stadium is in poor condition, with poor drainage, and in danger of being condemned.
