= Phiri (surname) =

Phiri is a surname. Notable people with the surname include:

- Alfred Phiri (born 1974), South African footballer
- Bobang Phiri (born 1968), South African sprinter
- Catherine Phiri, Zambian professional boxer
- David Phiri (1937–2012), Zambian businessman, former governor of the Central Bank of Zambia and chair of the Football Association of Zambia
- Davies Phiri (born 1976), Zambian football goalkeeper
- Desmond Dudwa Phiri, Malawian author, economist, historian, and playwright
- Dube Phiri (born 1983), Zambian footballer
- Edwin Phiri (born 1983), Zambian footballer
- Esther Phiri (born 1987), former Zambian boxer
- Gerald Phiri (born 1988), Zambian sprinter
- Gerald Phiri Jr. (born 1993), Malawian footballer
- James Phiri (1969–2001), Zambian footballer
- John Phiri (disambiguation), several people, including:
  - John "JP" Phiri (born 1962), Zimbabwean retired footballer
- July Phiri, former Rhodesian footballer, father of John Phiri
- Keatlaretse Phiri (Born 2004) South African Rapper, Producer Known As Brutha Khalil
- Kinnah Phiri (born 1954), Malawian footballer and coach
- Lebogang Phiri (born 1994), South African footballer
- Lire Phiri, Masotho footballer
- Patrick Phiri (born 1956), Zambian footballer and coach
- Peter Phiri (disambiguation), several people, including:
  - Peter Phiri (politician, born 1973), Zambian politician and MP for Mkaika
  - Peter Phiri (politician, born 1974), Zambian politician and MP for Malambo
- Raphael Phiri, Zimbabwean footballer who played for Rio Tinto FC
- Ray Phiri (1947–2017), South African jazz, fusion, and mbaqanga musician
- Willie Phiri (1953–2011), Zambian football midfielder and manager
