= 1979 CECAFA Cup =

Tournament details
- Host country: Kenya
- Dates: November 3–17
- Teams: 7 (from CECAFA confederations)

Final positions
- Champions: Malawi (2nd title)
- Runners-up: Kenya

Tournament statistics
- Matches played: 14
- Goals scored: 49 (3.5 per match)

The 1979 CECAFA Cup was the 7th edition of annual CECAFA Cup, an international football competition consisting of the national teams of member nations of the Council for East and Central Africa Football Associations (CECAFA). The tournament was held in Kenya from November 3 to November 17 and saw seven teams competing in the competition. It was held in Kenya, and was won by Malawi.

== Group A ==
Team	Pts	Pld	W	D	L	GF	GA	GD
Kenya	5	3	2	1	0	6	2	+4
Tanzania	4	3	1	2	0	7	5	+2
Zambia	3	3	1	1	1	5	6	–1
Uganda	0	3	0	0	3	5	10	–5

November 3, 1979

Kenya	0–0	Tanzania

November 4, 1979

Uganda	1–2	Zambia
Goal		Chitalu ?

November 6, 1979

Zambia	2–2	Tanzania
Chitalu; Chola		Goal

November 7, 1979

Kenya	3–1	Uganda

November 9, 1979

Tanzania	5–3	Uganda

November 10, 1979

Kenya	3–1	Zambia

== Group B ==
Team	Pts	Pld	W	D	L	GF	GA	GD
Malawi	4	2	2	0	0	8	0	+8
Zanzibar	1	2	0	1	1	1	5	–4
Sudan	1	2	0	1	1	1	5	–4

It is unclear why Zanzibar was placed the second over Sudan; probably by drawing lot

November 4, 1979

Malawi	4–0	Zanzibar
Chamangwana; Dandize; Mphamba

November 7, 1979

Malawi	4–0	Sudan
Waya; Phiri; Billie; Dandize

November 9, 1979

Zanzibar	1–1	Sudan

== Semifinals ==
November 13, 1979

Malawi	1–1	Tanzania
Gondwe

November 14, 1979

Malawi	0–0 (Replay)	Tanzania

November 14, 1979

Kenya	2–0	Zanzibar

Nairobi

== Third place match ==
November 16, 1979

Tanzania	2–1	Zanzibar

Mombasa

== Final ==
November 17, 1979

Malawi	3–2	Kenya
Thewe 87'; Dandize 90'; Gondwe 117'		Lukoye; Ochieng
