= List of men's footballers with 100 or more international caps =

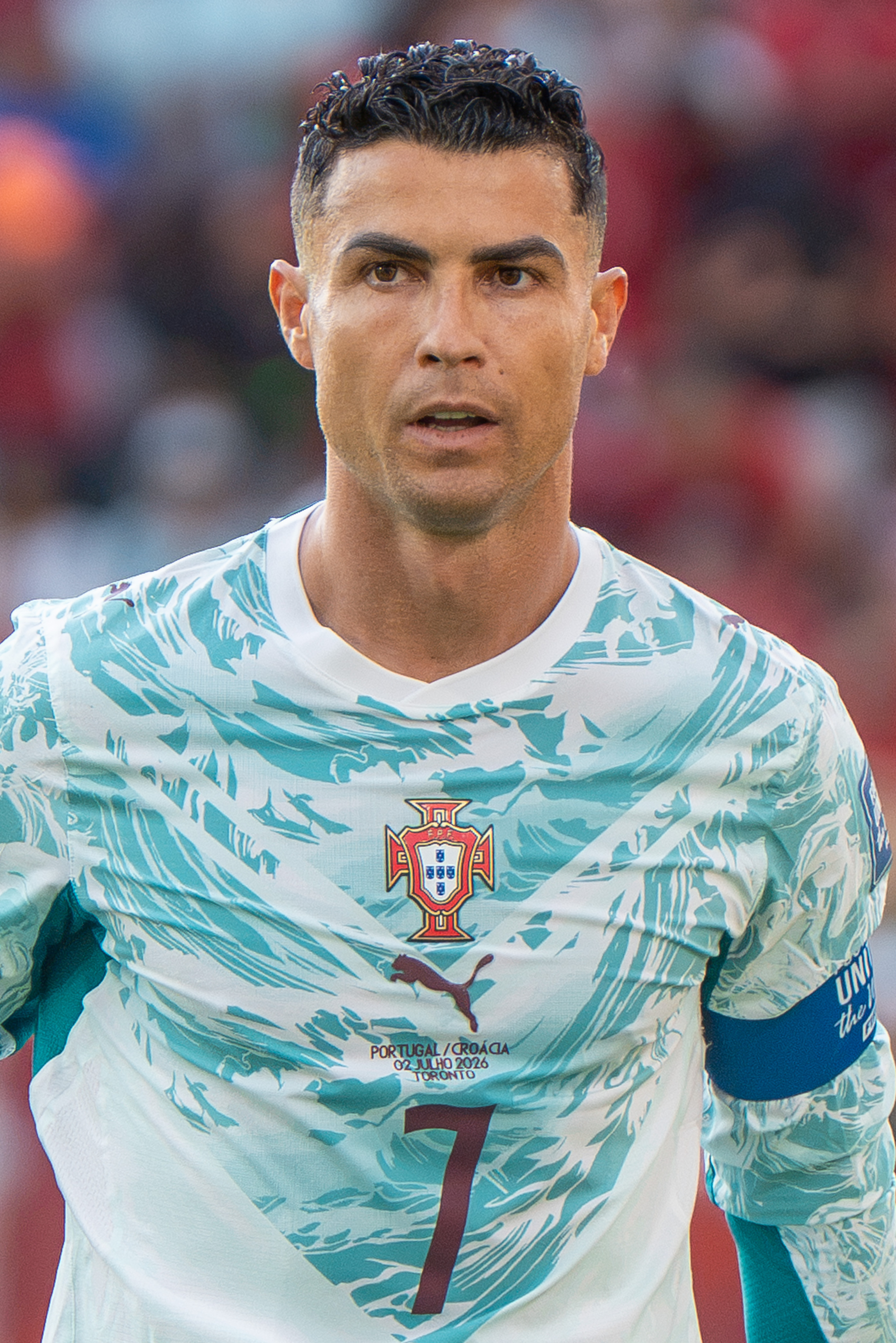
Cristiano Ronaldo, the current holder of the men's international appearance record

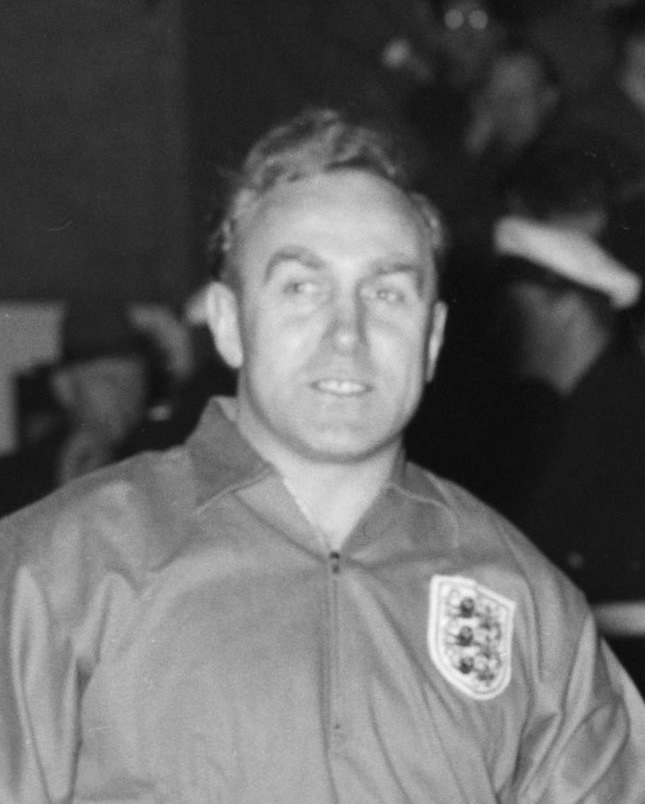
Billy Wright, the first player to reach 100 international caps

In association football, a cap is traditionally awarded in international football to a player making an official appearance for their national team. This article lists all men's footballers who have played in 100 or more official international matches for a national football team according to association football's world governing body FIFA. As of 17 November 2026, 704 men's footballers from 122 countries have officially played in 100 or more international matches. The record for the most official men's international appearances is currently held by Cristiano Ronaldo with 234 caps, surpassing Bader Al-Mutawa of Kuwait's previous record total of 196 caps in March 2023. Al-Mutawa's total number of international matches was later readjusted to 202, making him the first footballer to achieve the 200-match milestone.

Prior to Bader Al-Mutawa, the record was held by Soh Chin Ann of Malaysia, with 195 caps. This was only ratified by FIFA in August 2021, despite Soh Chin Ann playing his final match for Malaysia in 1984. In total, Soh Chin Ann has made 219 appearances for Malaysia. This discrepancy is due to FIFA not recognising matches such as those within the Olympic Games and those not categorised as 'A' matches. All 219 appearances made by Soh Chin Ann are recognised by football statistic organisations RSSSF and IFFHS. The first men's footballer to play in 100 official international matches was Billy Wright of England in 1959, his 100th match came against Scotland in April 1959. Wright would finish with 105 international caps.

== Men's footballers with 100 or more international caps ==
Indicates the most-capped player for respective confederation
Indicates the most-capped player for respective nation

Rank: The order of ranking with regards to international caps is in accordance with FIFA and their records. Records from other sources are not included in the official table, however, those from RSSSF whose cap totals are higher than those of FIFA are mentioned in the footnotes. Players who have achieved 100 or more international caps but are not recognised by FIFA are noted below the table.
Players: Players still active in their national teams are highlighted in bold. Player names are given in preference to their nationalities preference. For example: Icelandic players are sorted by first name, Brazilian, Portuguese, and Spanish players by nickname or first name (if more commonly used), and Chinese and Korean players by family name prefix. Players who have not been used in over two years since their last cap are no longer highlighted in bold. The player however may still be active and eligible for international selection.
Nation: Players represent a nation recognised by FIFA. These can be UN recognised countries, overseas territories or disputed states.
Confederation: Players & their nations are represented by 6 separate continental confederations within FIFA:

AFC: Asian Football Confederation
CAF: Confederation of African Football (French: Confédération Africaine de Football)
CONCACAF: Confederation of North, Central America and Caribbean Association Football
CONMEBOL: Confederación Sudamericana de Fútbol – (English: South American Football Confederation)
OFC: Oceania Football Confederation
UEFA: Union of European Football Associations – (French: Union des Associations Européennes de Football)

Debut: States the date in which the player made his first international appearance for the national team.
Latest: States the date in which the player made his last or most recent international appearance for the national team.

As of 17 November 2026

Rank	Player	Nation	Confederation	Caps	Debut	Latest
1	Cristiano Ronaldo	Portugal	UEFA	234	20 August 2003	24 September 2026
2	Lionel Messi	Argentina	CONMEBOL	208	17 August 2005	6 October 2026
2	**Luka Modrić**	Croatia	UEFA	208	1 March 2006	15 November 2026
4	Bader Al-Mutawa	Kuwait	AFC	202	4 September 2003	14 June 2022
5	Soh Chin Ann (Note: Excludes 24 unofficial Olympic matches: Japan (1971, 1980, 1984), South Korea (1971, 1980 twice), Taiwan (1971), Philippines (1971, 1980), West Germany, United States, Morocco (1972), Papua New Guinea, Singapore (1976), Indonesia (1976, 1980, 1983), Brunei (1980), Saudi Arabia (twice), India (1983), Qatar, Thailand and Iraq (1984).)	Malaysia	AFC	195	19 November 1969	18 October 1984
6	**Hassan Al-Haydos**	Qatar	AFC	194	9 August 2008	13 November 2026
7	Ahmed Kano	Oman	AFC	193	25 September 2003	2 December 2019
8	Ahmed Hassan	Egypt	CAF	184	29 December 1995	22 May 2012
9	Andrés Guardado	Mexico	CONCACAF	182	14 December 2005	15 October 2024
10	Maynor Figueroa	Honduras	CONCACAF	181	31 January 2003	2 February 2022
11	Sergio Ramos	Spain	UEFA	180	26 March 2005	31 March 2021
12	Claudio Suárez	Mexico	CONCACAF	179	26 July 1992	1 June 2006
13	Mohamed Al-Deayea	Saudi Arabia	AFC	178	9 April 1993	11 May 2006
14	Hossam Hassan	Egypt	CAF	177	10 September 1985	7 February 2006
15	Gianluigi Buffon	Italy	UEFA	176	29 October 1997	23 March 2018
16	**Robert Lewandowski**	Poland	UEFA	172	10 September 2008	17 November 2026
17	Amer Shafi	Jordan	AFC	171	17 August 2002	1 February 2021
18	**Celso Borges**	Costa Rica	CONCACAF	168	21 June 2008	17 November 2026
18	Iván Hurtado	Ecuador	CONMEBOL	168	24 May 1992	14 October 2014
18	**Alexis Sánchez**	Chile	CONMEBOL	168	27 April 2006	10 June 2025
21	Iker Casillas	Spain	UEFA	167	3 June 2000	1 June 2016
21	Vitālijs Astafjevs (Note: 1 unofficial FIFA match: Oman U23 (2005).)	Latvia	UEFA	166	26 August 1992	17 November 2010
23	Cobi Jones	United States	CONCACAF	164	3 September 1992	9 October 2004
24	Mohammed Al-Khilaiwi	Saudi Arabia	AFC	163	20 October 1992	5 October 2001
24	Sayed Mohammed Jaffer	Bahrain	AFC	163	5 July 2004	28 December 2024
24	**Ivan Perišić**	Croatia	UEFA	163	26 March 2011	15 November 2026
24	Shukor Salleh (Note: 9 unofficial Olympic matches: Papua New Guinea, North Korea, Singapore, Indonesia (1976), South Korea (twice), Brunei, Japan and Philippines (1980).)	Malaysia	AFC	163	15 November 1970	12 September 1981
28	Adnan Al-Talyani	United Arab Emirates	AFC	161	10 March 1984	17 December 1997
28	Diego Godín	Uruguay	CONMEBOL	161	26 October 2005	28 November 2022
28	Mohamed Husain	Bahrain	AFC	161	6 March 1997	15 January 2015
28	Salman Isa	Bahrain	AFC	161	20 March 2000	29 November 2012
28	Gary Medel	Chile	CONMEBOL	161	18 April 2007	16 November 2023
33	Aníbal Godoy	Panama	CONCACAF	160	3 March 2010	17 June 2026
33	**Hariss Harun**	Singapore	AFC	160	24 June 2007	17 November 2026
35	Essam El-Hadary	Egypt	CAF	159	25 March 1996	25 June 2018
35	Konstantin Vassiljev	Estonia	UEFA	159	31 May 2006	9 September 2025
37	Sunil Chhetri	India	AFC	157	12 June 2005	14 October 2025
37	Landon Donovan	United States	CONCACAF	157	25 October 2000	10 October 2014
37	Jan Vertonghen	Belgium	UEFA	157	2 June 2007	1 July 2024
40	Sami Al-Jaber	Saudi Arabia	AFC	156	11 September 1992	23 June 2006
40	Martin Reim (Note: 1 unofficial FIFA match: Belarus U21 (2004).)	Estonia	UEFA	156	3 June 1992	6 June 2009
42	**Son Heung-min**	South Korea	AFC	155	30 December 2010	17 November 2026
43	Guillermo Ochoa	Mexico	CONCACAF	154	14 December 2005	24 June 2026
44	Fawzi Bashir	Oman	AFC	152	18 February 2001	11 January 2013
44	Edin Džeko	Bosnia and Herzegovina	UEFA	152	2 June 2007	2 October 2026
44	Yasuhito Endō	Japan	AFC	152	20 November 2002	23 January 2015
44	**Granit Xhaka**	Switzerland	UEFA	152	4 June 2011	11 July 2026
48	Michael Bradley	United States	CONCACAF	151	26 May 2006	15 October 2019
48	**Christian Eriksen**	Denmark	UEFA	151	3 March 2010	6 June 2026
50	Claudio Bravo	Chile	CONMEBOL	150	11 July 2004	25 June 2024
50	**Joel Campbell**	Costa Rica	CONCACAF	150	5 June 2011	18 November 2025
50	**Ehsan Hajsafi**	Iran	AFC	150	25 May 2008	29 September 2026
50	Lothar Matthäus	West Germany; Germany	UEFA	150	14 June 1980	20 June 2000
50	Javad Nekounam	Iran	AFC	150	12 January 2000	31 March 2015
50	**Ricardo Rodriguez**	Switzerland	UEFA	150	7 October 2011	16 November 2026
56	Younis Mahmoud	Iraq	AFC	149	19 July 2002	29 March 2016
57	Ali Daei	Iran	AFC	148	6 June 1993	21 June 2006
57	Paulo da Silva	Paraguay	CONMEBOL	148	25 April 2000	10 October 2017
57	Gabriel Gómez	Panama	CONCACAF	148	9 February 2003	28 June 2018
57	Rafael Márquez	Mexico	CONCACAF	148	5 February 1997	2 July 2018
57	Pável Pardo	Mexico	CONCACAF	148	31 August 1996	6 June 2009
57	Mohamed Salmeen	Bahrain	AFC	148	18 September 1998	19 November 2013
63	Ali Al-Habsi	Oman	AFC	147	20 February 2001	18 November 2019
63	Daniel Bennett	Singapore	AFC	147	11 December 2002	14 November 2017
63	Javier Mascherano	Argentina	CONMEBOL	147	16 July 2003	30 June 2018
63	Bryan Ruiz	Costa Rica	CONCACAF	147	19 June 2005	23 November 2022
63	**Arturo Vidal**	Chile	CONMEBOL	147	7 February 2007	5 June 2025
68	Robbie Keane	Republic of Ireland	UEFA	146	25 March 1998	31 August 2016
68	João Moutinho	Portugal	UEFA	146	17 August 2005	9 June 2022
68	Yūto Nagatomo	Japan	AFC	146	24 May 2008	25 June 2026
68	Anders Svensson (Note: 2 unofficial FIFA matches: South Africa (2011) and Qatar U23 (2012).)	Sweden	UEFA	146	27 November 1999	19 November 2013
68	Gerardo Torrado	Mexico	CONCACAF	146	9 June 1999	6 September 2013
73	Ángel Di María	Argentina	CONMEBOL	145	6 September 2008	14 July 2024
73	Shahril Ishak	Singapore	AFC	145	4 March 2003	13 November 2018
73	Hugo Lloris	France	UEFA	145	19 November 2008	18 December 2022
73	Javier Zanetti	Argentina	CONMEBOL	145	16 November 1994	16 July 2011
77	Baha' Abdel-Rahman	Jordan	AFC	144	7 September 2007	14 June 2022
77	**Akram Afif**	Qatar	AFC	144	3 September 2015	17 November 2026
77	Mauricio Isla	Chile	CONMEBOL	144	7 September 2007	10 September 2024
77	Baihakki Khaizan	Singapore	AFC	144	4 August 2003	11 June 2021
77	Anatoliy Tymoshchuk	Ukraine	UEFA	144	26 April 2000	21 June 2016
82	Sergio Busquets	Spain	UEFA	143	1 April 2009	6 December 2022
82	**Idrissa Gueye**	Senegal	CAF	143	11 November 2011	4 October 2026
82	Thomas Ravelli	Sweden	UEFA	143	1 March 1981	11 October 1997
82	Tomás Rincón	Venezuela	CONMEBOL	143	3 February 2008	4 September 2025
82	Luis Suárez	Uruguay	CONMEBOL	143	7 February 2007	6 September 2024
87	Cafu	Brazil	CONMEBOL	142	12 September 1990	1 July 2006
87	Amer Deeb	Jordan	AFC	142	13 February 2002	13 October 2014
87	Marko Kristal	Estonia	UEFA	142	3 June 1992	20 April 2005
87	Michael Mifsud	Malta	UEFA	142	10 February 2000	11 November 2020
87	Alberto Quintero	Panama	CONCACAF	142	22 August 2007	27 June 2026
87	Lilian Thuram	France	UEFA	142	17 August 1994	13 June 2008
87	Abdullah Zubromawi	Saudi Arabia	AFC	142	18 April 1993	11 June 2002
94	Clint Dempsey	United States	CONCACAF	141	17 November 2004	10 October 2017
94	**Sayed Dhiya Saeed**	Bahrain	AFC	141	14 February 2011	17 November 2026
94	Pepe	Portugal	UEFA	141	21 November 2007	5 July 2024
97	Nicolás Otamendi	Argentina	CONMEBOL	140	20 May 2009	6 October 2026
97	Axel Witsel	Belgium	UEFA	140	26 March 2008	10 July 2026
99	Ismail Abdullatif	Bahrain	AFC	139	27 October 2005	25 March 2025
99	Steven Davis	Northern Ireland	UEFA	139	9 February 2005	27 September 2022
99	Giorgos Karagounis	Greece	UEFA	139	20 August 1999	29 June 2014
99	Hong Myung-bo	South Korea	AFC	139	4 February 1990	20 November 2002
99	**Yoshimar Yotún**	Peru	CONMEBOL	139	8 February 2011	13 November 2026
104	Hussein Abdulghani	Saudi Arabia	AFC	138	22 September 1996	20 November 2018
104	Mokhtar Dahari (Note: 4 unofficial Olympic matches: Papua New Guinea, North Korea, Singapore and Indonesia (1976).)	Malaysia	AFC	138	5 June 1972	19 May 1985
104	Amado Guevara	Honduras	CONCACAF	138	5 May 1994	21 June 2010
104	Marek Hamšík	Slovakia	UEFA	138	7 February 2007	20 June 2023
104	Osama Hawsawi	Saudi Arabia	AFC	138	11 October 2006	25 June 2018
104	Peter Pekarík	Slovakia	UEFA	138	10 December 2006	5 June 2026
110	Hatem Aqel	Jordan	AFC	137	26 September 1998	7 January 2014
110	Marko Arnautović	Austria	UEFA	137	11 October 2008	2 July 2026
110	Walter Centeno	Costa Rica	CONCACAF	137	27 September 1995	18 November 2009
110	Olivier Giroud	France	UEFA	137	11 November 2011	9 July 2024
110	Antoine Griezmann	France	UEFA	137	5 March 2014	9 September 2024
110	**Boualem Khoukhi**	Qatar	AFC	137	21 December 2013	17 November 2026
110	Miroslav Klose	Germany	UEFA	137	24 March 2001	13 July 2014
110	Ildefons Lima	Andorra	UEFA	137	22 June 1997	12 September 2023
110	Jari Litmanen	Finland	UEFA	137	22 October 1989	17 November 2010
110	Fernando Muslera	Uruguay	CONMEBOL	137	10 October 2009	26 June 2026
110	Jaime Penedo	Panama	CONCACAF	137	29 June 2003	28 June 2018
110	Rigobert Song	Cameroon	CAF	137	22 September 1993	24 June 2010
122	Waleed Ali	Kuwait	AFC	136	9 May 2002	20 January 2014
122	Khairul Amri	Singapore	AFC	136	9 June 2004	11 June 2019
122	**Safuwan Baharudin**	Singapore	AFC	136	17 January 2010	17 November 2026
122	**Karim Boudiaf**	Qatar	AFC	136	21 December 2013	17 November 2026
122	Fabio Cannavaro	Italy	UEFA	136	22 January 1997	24 June 2010
122	Edinson Cavani	Uruguay	CONMEBOL	136	6 February 2008	2 December 2022
122	**Abdelkarim Hassan**	Qatar	AFC	136	18 November 2010	20 March 2025
122	**Abdulaziz Hatem**	Qatar	AFC	136	30 December 2009	17 November 2026
122	Ismail Matar	United Arab Emirates	AFC	136	27 September 2003	6 December 2021
131	Ahmed Fathy	Egypt	CAF	135	16 December 2002	16 November 2021
131	Romelu Lukaku	Belgium	UEFA	135	3 March 2010	5 October 2026
131	Noel Valladares	Honduras	CONCACAF	135	3 June 2000	10 February 2016
131	**Yousef Nasser**	Kuwait	AFC	135	31 May 2009	29 September 2026
135	Bashar Abdullah	Kuwait	AFC	134	16 March 1996	25 May 2018
135	Jeff Agoos	United States	CONCACAF	134	10 January 1988	26 May 2003
135	**Waleed Al-Hayam**	Bahrain	AFC	134	25 December 2010	17 November 2026
135	**Almoez Ali**	Qatar	AFC	134	21 December 2013	17 November 2026
135	Taisir Al-Jassim	Saudi Arabia	AFC	134	17 November 2004	20 June 2018
135	Boniek García	Honduras	CONCACAF	134	1 July 2005	7 October 2021
135	Shay Given	Republic of Ireland	UEFA	134	27 March 1996	31 May 2016
135	**Sadio Mané**	Senegal	CAF	134	25 May 2012	1 July 2026
135	Hassan Mudhafar	Oman	AFC	134	16 September 2003	30 March 2015
135	Dorinel Munteanu	Romania	UEFA	134	23 May 1991	12 September 2007
135	Andres Oper	Estonia	UEFA	134	19 May 1995	26 May 2014
135	Wesley Sneijder	Netherlands	UEFA	134	30 April 2003	6 September 2018
135	Darijo Srna	Croatia	UEFA	134	20 November 2002	25 June 2016
148	Amad Al-Hosni	Oman	AFC	133	17 December 2003	17 November 2015
148	Andreas Isaksson	Sweden	UEFA	133	3 March 2002	22 June 2016
148	Saud Kariri	Saudi Arabia	AFC	133	23 July 2001	18 January 2015
148	Sebastian Larsson	Sweden	UEFA	133	6 February 2008	29 June 2021
148	Teemu Pukki	Finland	UEFA	133	4 February 2009	17 November 2025
148	Carlos Ruiz	Guatemala	CONCACAF	133	18 November 1998	6 September 2016
148	Lee Woon-jae	South Korea	AFC	133	11 June 1994	11 August 2010
148	Xavi	Spain	UEFA	133	15 November 2000	13 June 2014
156	Sargis Hovsepyan (Note: 1 unofficial FIFA match: Moldova (1992).)	Armenia	UEFA	132	14 October 1992	14 November 2012
156	Peter Jehle	Liechtenstein	UEFA	132	14 October 1998	25 March 2018
156	Simon Kjær	Denmark	UEFA	132	6 June 2009	8 June 2024
156	Héctor Moreno	Mexico	CONCACAF	132	17 October 2007	26 March 2023
160	**Kamil Al-Aswad**	Bahrain	AFC	131	30 May 2015	17 November 2026
160	**Jesús Gallardo**	Mexico	CONCACAF	131	8 October 2016	14 November 2026
160	**Pedro Gallese**	Peru	CONMEBOL	131	6 August 2014	13 November 2026
160	Ibrahim Hassan	Egypt	CAF	131	3 February 1988	6 January 2002
160	Andrés Iniesta	Spain	UEFA	131	27 May 2006	1 July 2018
160	Kim Källström	Sweden	UEFA	131	1 February 2001	22 June 2016
160	Thomas Müller	Germany	UEFA	131	3 March 2010	5 July 2024
160	Arumugan Rengasamy (Note: 11 unofficial Olympic matches: Papua New Guinea, North Korea (1976), Singapore (1976, 1983), Indonesia (1976, 1980), South Korea (1980 twice), India and Iraq (1983).)	Malaysia	AFC	131	17 May 1973	23 September 1986
160	James Rodríguez	Colombia	CONMEBOL	131	11 October 2011	7 July 2026
160	Kiatisuk Senamuang	Thailand	AFC	131	8 April 1993	3 October 2007
160	Lee Young-pyo	South Korea	AFC	131	12 June 1999	28 January 2011
171	**Luis Advíncula**	Peru	CONMEBOL	130	4 September 2010	9 September 2025
171	Jorge Campos	Mexico	CONCACAF	130	20 November 1991	19 November 2003
171	Cha Bum-kun (Note: 6 unofficial Olympic matches: Taiwan (1975, 1976), Japan (1976 twice) and Israel (1976 twice).)	South Korea	AFC	130	7 May 1972	10 June 1986
171	**Teerasil Dangda**	Thailand	AFC	130	7 July 2007	9 June 2026
171	**Raúl Jiménez**	Mexico	CONCACAF	130	30 January 2013	5 July 2026
171	Neymar	Brazil	CONMEBOL	130	10 August 2010	5 July 2026
171	David Ospina	Colombia	CONMEBOL	130	7 February 2007	1 June 2026
171	Lukas Podolski	Germany	UEFA	130	6 June 2004	22 March 2017
171	Edwin van der Sar	Netherlands	UEFA	130	7 June 1995	15 October 2008
180	**Kevin De Bruyne**	Belgium	UEFA	129	11 August 2010	15 November 2026
180	Paolo Guerrero	Peru	CONMEBOL	129	9 October 2004	10 June 2025
180	Guram Kashia	Georgia	UEFA	129	1 April 2009	2 June 2026
180	Ragnar Klavan	Estonia	UEFA	129	3 July 2003	21 March 2024
184	Juan Arango (Note: 1 unofficial FIFA match: Mexico U23 (2011).)	Venezuela	CONMEBOL	128	27 January 1999	8 September 2015
184	**Laurent Jans**	Luxembourg	UEFA	128	16 October 2012	16 November 2026
184	Luis Marín	Costa Rica	CONCACAF	128	23 June 1993	18 November 2009
184	**Keylor Navas**	Costa Rica	CONCACAF	128	11 October 2008	4 October 2026
184	Manuel Neuer	Germany	UEFA	128	2 June 2009	29 June 2026
184	Roberto Palacios	Peru	CONMEBOL	128	24 November 1992	23 May 2012
184	Márcio Vieira	Andorra	UEFA	128	12 October 2005	11 June 2024
191	Toby Alderweireld	Belgium	UEFA	127	29 May 2009	1 December 2022
191	Mohammed Al-Musalami	Oman	AFC	127	21 September 2010	4 January 2025
191	**Harib Al-Saadi**	Oman	AFC	127	24 March 2016	14 November 2026
191	Hassouneh Al-Sheikh	Jordan	AFC	127	19 April 1997	28 September 2010
191	Marcelo Balboa	United States	CONCACAF	127	10 January 1988	16 January 2000
191	Server Djeparov (Note: 1 unofficial FIFA match: Bahrain (2005).)	Uzbekistan	AFC	127	14 May 2002	5 September 2017
191	Luís Figo	Portugal	UEFA	127	12 October 1991	8 July 2006
191	Sergei Ignashevich	Russia	UEFA	127	21 August 2002	7 July 2018
191	**Harry Kane**	England	UEFA	127	27 March 2015	15 November 2026
191	Ali Karimi	Iran	AFC	127	13 October 1998	6 November 2012
191	Dennis Rommedahl	Denmark	UEFA	127	16 August 2000	11 June 2013
191	**Andriy Yarmolenko**	Ukraine	UEFA	127	5 September 2009	2 October 2026
191	Maya Yoshida	Japan	AFC	127	6 January 2010	31 May 2026
204	Dani Alves	Brazil	CONMEBOL	126	10 October 2006	5 December 2022
204	**Jordan Ayew**	Ghana	CAF	126	8 September 2010	16 November 2026
204	DaMarcus Beasley	United States	CONCACAF	126	27 January 2001	5 September 2017
204	Eden Hazard	Belgium	UEFA	126	16 November 2008	1 December 2022
204	Enar Jääger	Estonia	UEFA	126	12 October 2002	9 November 2017
204	Paolo Maldini	Italy	UEFA	126	31 March 1988	18 June 2002
204	Yénier Márquez	Cuba	CONCACAF	126	7 May 2000	15 July 2015
204	Kennedy Mweene	Zambia	CAF	126	22 May 2004	14 July 2021
204	Musaed Neda	Kuwait	AFC	126	18 December 2002	13 October 2015
204	Sebastián Soria	Qatar	AFC	126	15 November 2006	14 October 2025
204	Andoni Zubizarreta	Spain	UEFA	126	23 January 1985	24 June 1998
215	Alaa Abdul-Zahra	Iraq	AFC	125	8 June 2007	11 November 2021
215	Roberto Carlos	Brazil	CONMEBOL	125	26 February 1992	1 July 2006
215	Mario Frick	Liechtenstein	UEFA	125	26 October 1993	12 October 2015
215	Ian Goodison (Note: 3 unofficial FIFA matches: Saint Lucia (1997) and Guadeloupe (1999, 2002).)	Jamaica	CONCACAF	125	3 March 1996	23 May 2009
215	Sayed Mahmood Jalal	Bahrain	AFC	125	13 September 1998	20 January 2010
215	Maxi Pereira	Uruguay	CONMEBOL	125	26 October 2005	7 June 2018
215	Xherdan Shaqiri	Switzerland	UEFA	125	3 March 2010	6 July 2024
215	Peter Shilton	England	UEFA	125	25 November 1970	7 July 1990
215	David Silva	Spain	UEFA	125	15 November 2006	1 July 2018
224	Hussain Ali Baba	Bahrain	AFC	124	13 December 2001	1 September 2016
224	Petr Čech	Czech Republic	UEFA	124	12 February 2002	21 June 2016
224	Linval Dixon (Note: 3 unofficial FIFA matches: Saint Martin (1993) and Martinique (1993, 2001).)	Jamaica	CONCACAF	124	21 May 1993	2 April 2003
224	Domingues	Mozambique	CAF	124	13 June 2004	5 January 2026
224	Gheorghe Hagi	Romania	UEFA	124	10 August 1983	24 June 2000
224	Marc Pujol	Andorra	UEFA	124	6 February 2000	4 June 2026
224	**Mohamed Salah**	Egypt	CAF	124	3 September 2011	17 November 2026
224	Carlos Salcido	Mexico	CONCACAF	124	8 September 2004	29 June 2014
224	Yoo Sang-chul (Note: 1 unofficial FIFA matches: Japan U21 (1998).)	South Korea	AFC	124	11 September 1994	3 June 2005
233	Saad Al-Mukhaini	Oman	AFC	123	8 November 2006	2 December 2019
233	Armando Cooper	Panama	CONCACAF	123	7 October 2006	2 February 2022
233	Thierry Henry	France	UEFA	123	11 October 1997	22 June 2010
233	**Mateo Kovačić**	Croatia	UEFA	123	22 March 2013	15 November 2026
233	Hassan Maatouk	Lebanon	AFC	123	27 January 2006	11 June 2024
233	Aïssa Mandi	Algeria	CAF	123	5 March 2014	2 July 2026
233	Blas Pérez	Panama	CONCACAF	123	14 March 2001	24 June 2018
233	Didier Zokora	Ivory Coast	CAF	123	23 April 2000	19 June 2014
241	Walter Ayoví	Ecuador	CONMEBOL	122	7 June 2001	28 March 2017
241	Zlatan Ibrahimović	Sweden	UEFA	122	31 January 2001	24 March 2023
241	Masami Ihara	Japan	AFC	122	27 January 1988	5 July 1999
241	Odelín Molina	Cuba	CONCACAF	122	12 May 1996	20 July 2013
241	Goran Pandev	North Macedonia	UEFA	122	6 June 2001	21 June 2021
241	Hany Ramzy	Egypt	CAF	122	16 November 1988	12 February 2003
241	**Salomón Rondón**	Venezuela	CONMEBOL	122	3 February 2008	30 March 2026
241	Kolo Touré	Ivory Coast	CAF	122	2 July 2000	8 February 2015
249	Mohamed Abd Al-Jawad	Saudi Arabia	AFC	121	8 March 1981	3 July 1994
249	Bashar Bani Yaseen	Jordan	AFC	121	25 August 1999	3 June 2012
249	Cuauhtémoc Blanco	Mexico	CONCACAF	121	1 February 1995	28 May 2014
249	Leonardo Bonucci	Italy	UEFA	121	3 March 2010	15 June 2023
249	**Francisco Calvo**	Costa Rica	CONCACAF	121	2 July 2011	17 November 2026
249	Tim Howard	United States	CONCACAF	121	10 March 2002	10 October 2017
249	Aide Iskandar	Singapore	AFC	121	21 February 1995	12 September 2007
249	Peter Schmeichel (Note: 8 unofficial Olympic matches: Greece, Poland, West Germany (1987, 1988) and Romania (1987 twice).)	Denmark	UEFA	121	10 May 1988	25 April 2001
249	Bastian Schweinsteiger	Germany	UEFA	121	6 June 2004	31 August 2016
258	Gilbert Agius	Malta	UEFA	120	7 November 1993	18 November 2009
258	André Ayew	Ghana	CAF	120	21 August 2007	26 January 2024
258	Subait Khater	United Arab Emirates	AFC	120	20 August 1999	15 November 2011
258	Riyad Mahrez	Algeria	CAF	120	31 May 2014	2 July 2026
258	Mart Poom	Estonia	UEFA	120	3 June 1992	10 June 2009
258	Ramón Ramírez	Mexico	CONCACAF	120	4 December 1991	15 November 2000
258	Rüştü Reçber	Turkey	UEFA	120	12 October 1994	26 May 2012
258	Wayne Rooney	England	UEFA	120	12 February 2003	15 November 2018
258	Kasper Schmeichel	Denmark	UEFA	120	6 February 2013	18 November 2025
258	Román Torres	Panama	CONCACAF	120	17 July 2005	15 November 2019
258	**Eduardo Vargas**	Chile	CONMEBOL	120	4 November 2009	25 March 2025
258	Justo Villar	Paraguay	CONMEBOL	120	3 March 1999	12 June 2018
270	Odai Al-Saify	Jordan	AFC	119	18 June 2007	28 March 2023
270	David Carabott (Note: 1 unofficial FIFA matches: Libya (1988).)	Malta	UEFA	119	15 November 1987	9 February 2005
270	Pat Jennings	Northern Ireland	UEFA	119	15 April 1964	12 June 1986
270	Timur Kapadze	Uzbekistan	AFC	119	14 May 2002	22 January 2015
270	**Andrej Kramarić**	Croatia	UEFA	119	4 September 2014	2 July 2026
270	Shinji Okazaki	Japan	AFC	119	9 October 2008	24 June 2019
270	Talal Yousef	Bahrain	AFC	119	3 June 1996	7 January 2009
270	Theodoros Zagorakis (Note: 1 unofficial FIFA match: Romania (2002).)	Greece	UEFA	119	7 September 1994	22 August 2007
278	Mohammad Al-Shalhoub	Saudi Arabia	AFC	118	21 May 2000	28 February 2018
278	Bruno Ecuele Manga	Gabon	CAF	118	7 October 2006	28 December 2025
278	Samuel Eto'o	Cameroon	CAF	118	9 March 1997	13 June 2014
278	Geremi	Cameroon	CAF	118	6 October 1996	24 June 2010
278	Heinz Hermann	Switzerland	UEFA	118	6 September 1978	13 November 1991
278	Ahmed Ibrahim Khalaf	Iraq	AFC	118	11 November 2010	26 September 2022
278	**Joshua Kimmich**	Germany	UEFA	118	29 May 2016	16 November 2026
278	**Chancel Mbemba**	DR Congo	CAF	118	17 June 2012	17 November 2026
278	Ri Myong-guk	North Korea	AFC	118	24 June 2007	17 January 2019
278	John O'Shea	Republic of Ireland	UEFA	118	15 August 2001	2 June 2018
278	**Pedro Miguel**	Qatar	AFC	118	29 March 2016	3 October 2026
278	Karel Poborský	Czech Republic	UEFA	118	23 February 1994	22 June 2006
290	**Vincent Aboubakar**	Cameroon	CAF	117	29 May 2010	13 November 2025
290	**David Alaba**	Austria	UEFA	117	14 October 2009	2 July 2026
290	Husain Ali	Bahrain	AFC	117	3 October 1998	9 November 2013
290	Hamza Al-Dardour	Jordan	AFC	117	2 January 2011	25 January 2024
290	Giorgio Chiellini	Italy	UEFA	117	17 November 2004	1 June 2022
290	Daniele De Rossi	Italy	UEFA	117	4 September 2004	10 November 2017
290	Kim Ho-kon (Note: 7 unofficial Olympic matches: Taiwan (1971, 1975, 1976), Japan (1976 twice) and Israel (1976 twice).)	South Korea	AFC	117	14 November 1971	4 March 1979
290	Ahmed Jamil	Saudi Arabia	AFC	117	25 February 1986	4 May 1998
290	**Ali Madan**	Bahrain	AFC	117	5 February 2016	17 November 2026
290	Olof Mellberg	Sweden	UEFA	117	23 February 2000	19 June 2012
290	Noureddine Naybet	Morocco	CAF	117	9 August 1990	28 January 2006
290	Shunmugham Subramani	Singapore	AFC	117	27 June 1996	4 February 2007
290	Hassan Sunny	Singapore	AFC	117	18 February 2004	11 June 2024
290	**Dušan Tadić**	Serbia	UEFA	117	14 December 2008	16 November 2026
304	Majed Abdullah (Note: 1 unofficial FIFA match: Iraq (1985).)	Saudi Arabia	AFC	116	9 December 1978	29 June 1994
304	Zainal Abidin Hassan (Note: 13 unofficial Olympic matches: Indonesia, Singapore, India (1983 twice), Saudi Arabia (1983), Qatar, Japan, Iraq (1984) and Thailand (1984, 1987 twice).)	Malaysia	AFC	116	11 November 1980	14 October 1997
304	Nawaf Al-Khaldi	Kuwait	AFC	116	18 February 2000	20 November 2014
304	Khaled Al-Muwallid	Saudi Arabia	AFC	116	17 February 1988	18 June 1998
304	Martín Cáceres	Uruguay	CONMEBOL	116	12 September 2007	24 November 2022
304	Juan Cuadrado	Colombia	CONMEBOL	116	3 September 2010	7 September 2023
304	Abdallah Deeb	Jordan	AFC	116	7 September 2007	15 November 2016
304	Marcel Desailly	France	UEFA	116	22 August 1993	17 June 2004
304	Kostas Katsouranis	Greece	UEFA	116	20 August 2003	16 June 2015
304	Yoshikatsu Kawaguchi	Japan	AFC	116	15 March 1997	19 November 2008
304	Roland Nilsson	Sweden	UEFA	116	1 May 1986	11 October 2000
304	Andrea Pirlo	Italy	UEFA	116	7 September 2002	3 September 2015
304	Wesam Rizik	Qatar	AFC	116	18 October 2001	13 November 2014
304	**Bernardo Silva**	Portugal	UEFA	116	31 March 2015	14 November 2026
304	Theodore Whitmore (Note: 4 unofficial FIFA matches: Guadeloupe (1999), Martinique (2001, 2003) and 1 unspecified.)	Jamaica	CONCACAF	116	7 November 1993	17 November 2004
319	Rashid Al-Dosari	Bahrain	AFC	115	13 September 1998	23 December 2008
319	Ismail Al-Hammadi (Note: 1 unofficial FIFA match: Unspecified.)	United Arab Emirates	AFC	115	23 September 2007	2 December 2019
319	Jozy Altidore	United States	CONCACAF	115	17 November 2007	7 July 2019
319	Roberto Ayala	Argentina	CONMEBOL	115	16 November 1994	15 July 2007
319	David Beckham	England	UEFA	115	1 September 1996	14 October 2009
319	**Thibaut Courtois**	Belgium	UEFA	115	15 November 2011	10 July 2026
319	Gonzalo Jara	Chile	CONMEBOL	115	25 April 2006	6 July 2019
319	Abdulrahim Jumaa (Note: 1 unofficial FIFA Match: Japan U21 (1998).)	United Arab Emirates	AFC	115	25 November 1998	1 April 2009
319	Ali Mabkhout	United Arab Emirates	AFC	115	15 November 2009	6 January 2024
319	Bilal Mohammed	Qatar	AFC	115	4 September 2003	31 December 2014
319	Chandran Mutveeran (Note: 7 unofficial Olympic matches: Japan, South Korea, Taiwan, Philippines (1971), West Germany, United States and Morocco (1972).)	Malaysia	AFC	115	14 August 1965	15 September 1974
319	Miralem Pjanić	Bosnia and Herzegovina	UEFA	115	20 August 2008	21 March 2024
319	Gheorghe Popescu	Romania	UEFA	115	20 September 1988	29 March 2003
319	Andrejs Rubins (Note: 2 unofficial FIFA matches: Oman U23 (2005) and Bolivia (2011).)	Latvia	UEFA	115	10 November 1998	11 October 2011
333	Xabi Alonso	Spain	UEFA	114	30 April 2003	23 June 2014
333	**Salem Al-Dawsari**	Saudi Arabia	AFC	114	29 February 2012	26 June 2026
333	Angus Eve (Note: 4 unofficial FIFA matches: Martinique (1994, 1997, 2002) and Guadeloupe (1999).)	Trinidad and Tobago	CONCACAF	114	12 April 1994	12 July 2005
333	Steven Gerrard	England	UEFA	114	31 May 2000	24 June 2014
333	Wael Gomaa	Egypt	CAF	114	26 April 2001	15 October 2013
333	Makoto Hasebe	Japan	AFC	114	10 February 2006	2 July 2018
333	**Nicolas Hasler**	Liechtenstein	UEFA	114	11 August 2010	1 October 2026
333	Jalal Hosseini	Iran	AFC	114	7 February 2007	18 May 2018
333	Toni Kroos	Germany	UEFA	114	3 March 2010	5 July 2024
333	Dmitri Kruglov	Estonia	UEFA	114	13 October 2004	26 March 2019
333	Gao Lin	China	AFC	114	31 July 2005	24 January 2019
333	Björn Nordqvist (Note: 1 unofficial Olympic match: Hungary (1963).)	Sweden	UEFA	114	4 May 1963	4 October 1978
333	Didier Ovono	Gabon	CAF	114	29 March 2003	23 March 2019
333	Raio Piiroja	Estonia	UEFA	114	21 November 1998	31 March 2015
333	Stipe Pletikosa	Croatia	UEFA	114	10 February 1999	23 June 2014
333	**Josué Quijano**	Nicaragua	CONCACAF	114	14 January 2011	17 November 2026
333	Ali Rehema	Iraq	AFC	114	8 June 2005	29 March 2016
333	Indra Sahdan Daud	Singapore	AFC	114	26 April 1997	10 September 2013
333	Kristen Viikmäe	Estonia	UEFA	114	26 January 1997	3 June 2013
333	Sergei Zenjov	Estonia	UEFA	114	20 August 2008	11 October 2024
333	**Piotr Zieliński**	Poland	UEFA	114	4 June 2013	17 November 2026
354	Nashat Akram	Iraq	AFC	113	5 October 2001	4 June 2013
354	Ahmed Al-Dokhi	Saudi Arabia	AFC	113	2 March 1997	15 November 2006
354	Birkir Bjarnason	Iceland	UEFA	113	29 October 2010	16 November 2022
354	**Kiran Chemjong** (Note: 1 unrecognised FIFA match: Northern Mariana Islands (2013).)	Nepal	AFC	113	24 May 2008	31 March 2026
354	Rolando Fonseca	Costa Rica	CONCACAF	113	27 May 1992	26 March 2011
354	Max Gradel	Ivory Coast	CAF	113	5 June 2011	23 March 2024
354	Aron Gunnarsson	Iceland	UEFA	113	2 February 2008	16 November 2026
354	Philipp Lahm	Germany	UEFA	113	18 February 2004	13 July 2014
354	Hawar Mulla Mohammed	Iraq	AFC	113	31 August 2001	12 June 2012
354	Viktor Onopko	CIS; Russia	UEFA	113	29 April 1992	18 August 2004
354	Răzvan Raț	Romania	UEFA	113	13 February 2002	15 June 2016
354	Thiago Silva	Brazil	CONMEBOL	113	12 October 2008	9 December 2022
354	Martin Stocklasa	Liechtenstein	UEFA	113	31 August 1996	5 March 2014
354	Kim Young-gwon	South Korea	AFC	113	11 August 2010	5 September 2024
368	Jarah Al Ateeqi	Kuwait	AFC	112	3 August 2001	19 November 2013
368	Abdulla Al-Marzooqi	Bahrain	AFC	112	3 February 2001	15 January 2013
368	Yasser Al-Qahtani	Saudi Arabia	AFC	112	17 December 2002	12 January 2013
368	Zuhair Bakheet	United Arab Emirates	AFC	112	23 January 1988	16 December 2002
368	Franz Burgmeier	Liechtenstein	UEFA	112	5 September 2001	25 March 2018
368	Frank de Boer	Netherlands	UEFA	112	26 September 1990	26 June 2004
368	**Memphis Depay**	Netherlands	UEFA	112	15 October 2013	25 June 2026
368	Abdel-Zaher El-Saqqa	Egypt	CAF	112	8 June 1997	20 January 2010
368	Diego Forlán	Uruguay	CONMEBOL	112	27 March 2002	28 June 2014
368	Alain Geiger	Switzerland	UEFA	112	19 November 1980	8 June 1996
368	Aaron Hughes	Northern Ireland	UEFA	112	24 March 1998	3 June 2018
368	**Yapp Hung Fai**	Hong Kong	AFC	112	11 February 2010	9 October 2025
368	**Lee Jae-sung**	South Korea	AFC	112	17 March 2015	17 November 2026
368	**Franck Kessié**	Ivory Coast	CAF	112	6 September 2014	17 November 2026
368	Juraj Kucka	Slovakia	UEFA	112	19 November 2008	8 September 2024
368	Juris Laizāns	Latvia	UEFA	112	6 February 1998	15 November 2013
368	**Marquinhos**	Brazil	CONMEBOL	112	16 November 2013	3 October 2026
368	Nani	Portugal	UEFA	112	1 September 2006	2 July 2017
368	Claudio Reyna	United States	CONCACAF	112	15 January 1994	22 June 2006
368	Álvaro Saborío	Costa Rica	CONCACAF	112	1 October 2002	13 October 2021
368	Roque Santa Cruz	Paraguay	CONMEBOL	112	28 April 1999	10 November 2016
368	Hakan Şükür	Turkey	UEFA	112	25 March 1992	17 October 2007
368	Ki Sung-yueng	South Korea	AFC	112	5 September 2008	7 January 2019
368	Jon Dahl Tomasson	Denmark	UEFA	112	29 March 1997	24 June 2010
368	Li Weifeng	China	AFC	112	22 November 1998	15 November 2011
368	Dino Zoff	Italy	UEFA	112	20 April 1968	29 May 1983
394	Igor Akinfeev	Russia	UEFA	111	27 April 2004	7 July 2018
394	**Mahmoud Al-Mawas**	Syria	AFC	111	17 November 2012	1 October 2026
394	Gareth Bale	Wales	UEFA	111	27 May 2006	29 November 2022
394	Emilio Izaguirre	Honduras	CONCACAF	111	26 January 2007	11 October 2020
394	Abdulsalam Jumaa	United Arab Emirates	AFC	111	18 March 1997	6 January 2010
394	Mahdi Karim	Iraq	AFC	111	12 October 2001	28 February 2018
394	Zhang Linpeng	China	AFC	111	30 December 2009	21 March 2024
394	Édison Méndez	Ecuador	CONMEBOL	111	8 March 2000	20 June 2014
394	José Manuel Rey (Note: 4 unofficial FIFA matches: Mexico U20 (2000), Cameroon U21, Morocco Olympic (2002) and Mexico U23 (2011).)	Venezuela	CONMEBOL	111	8 June 1997	7 October 2011
394	Andriy Shevchenko	Ukraine	UEFA	111	25 March 1995	19 June 2012
394	**Mehdi Taremi**	Iran	AFC	111	11 June 2015	29 September 2026
394	Carlos Valderrama	Colombia	CONMEBOL	111	27 October 1985	26 June 1998
394	Zheng Zhi	China	AFC	111	7 December 2002	14 November 2019
407	**Ali Al-Busaidi**	Oman	AFC	110	9 October 2013	8 December 2025
407	François Amégasse	Gabon	CAF	110	13 November 1984	29 January 2000
407	Carlos Bocanegra	United States	CONCACAF	110	9 December 2001	14 November 2012
407	Carmel Busuttil	Malta	UEFA	110	5 June 1982	25 April 2001
407	**Hakan Çalhanoğlu**	Turkey	UEFA	110	6 September 2013	15 November 2026
407	Paul Caligiuri	United States	CONCACAF	110	9 October 1984	16 November 1997
407	**Darwin Cerén**	El Salvador	CONCACAF	110	24 May 2012	18 November 2025
407	Fernando Couto	Portugal	UEFA	110	19 December 1990	30 June 2004
407	Ahmed El-Kass	Egypt	CAF	110	4 April 1987	6 April 1997
407	Cesc Fàbregas	Spain	UEFA	110	1 March 2006	27 June 2016
407	Carlos Gamarra	Paraguay	CONMEBOL	110	3 March 1993	7 October 2006
407	Mohamad Haidar	Lebanon	AFC	110	17 August 2011	4 June 2026
407	Kevin Kilbane	Republic of Ireland	UEFA	110	6 September 1997	4 June 2011
407	Mehdi Mahdavikia	Iran	AFC	110	7 December 1996	17 June 2009
407	Imran Mohamed	Maldives	AFC	110	15 February 2000	11 October 2016
407	Ahmed Musa	Nigeria	CAF	110	5 September 2010	28 May 2025
407	Yuji Nakazawa	Japan	AFC	110	8 September 1999	4 September 2010
407	John Arne Riise	Norway	UEFA	110	31 January 2000	22 March 2013
407	Cristian Rodríguez	Uruguay	CONMEBOL	110	14 October 2003	6 July 2018
407	Mauricio Solís	Costa Rica	CONCACAF	110	23 September 1993	20 June 2006
407	Totchtawan Sripan	Thailand	AFC	110	16 February 1993	28 March 2009
407	Fernando Torres	Spain	UEFA	110	6 September 2003	23 June 2014
429	Hassan Abdel-Fattah	Jordan	AFC	109	7 December 2002	13 October 2015
429	Niclas Alexandersson	Sweden	UEFA	109	10 November 1993	10 June 2008
429	Nohair Al-Shammari	Kuwait	AFC	109	16 March 1996	14 January 2009
429	Jean Beausejour	Chile	CONMEBOL	109	19 February 2004	17 November 2020
429	Jakub Błaszczykowski	Poland	UEFA	109	28 March 2006	16 June 2023
429	**André Carrillo**	Peru	CONMEBOL	109	12 July 2011	6 October 2026
429	Eric Davis	Panama	CONCACAF	109	11 August 2010	27 June 2026
429	Balázs Dzsudzsák	Hungary	UEFA	109	2 June 2007	20 November 2022
429	Alberto García Aspe	Mexico	CONCACAF	109	26 April 1988	17 June 2002
429	Chris Gunter	Wales	UEFA	109	26 May 2007	14 June 2022
429	Asamoah Gyan	Ghana	CAF	109	16 November 2003	8 July 2019
429	Wayne Hennessey	Wales	UEFA	109	26 May 2007	11 October 2023
429	Javier Hernández	Mexico	CONCACAF	109	30 September 2009	6 September 2019
429	**Lukas Hradecky**	Finland	UEFA	109	21 May 2010	12 November 2026
429	Dries Mertens	Belgium	UEFA	109	9 February 2011	1 December 2022
429	**Karol Mets**	Estonia	UEFA	109	19 November 2013	16 November 2026
429	Mark Schwarzer	Australia	OFC / AFC^{[1]}	109	31 July 1993	7 September 2013
429	Wael Sulaiman	Kuwait	AFC	109	1 October 1986	27 December 1998
429	Enner Valencia	Ecuador	CONMEBOL	109	12 February 2012	30 June 2026
429	Rafael van der Vaart	Netherlands	UEFA	109	6 October 2001	19 November 2013
449	Álex Aguinaga (Note: 1 unofficial FIFA match: Peru (1987).)	Ecuador	CONMEBOL	108	5 March 1987	13 July 2004
449	Odil Ahmedov	Uzbekistan	AFC	108	13 October 2007	15 June 2021
449	Maher Al-Sayed	Syria	AFC	108	17 October 1998	26 March 2013
449	Anas Bani Yaseen	Jordan	AFC	108	13 August 2008	25 January 2024
449	**Yoel Bárcenas**	Panama	CONCACAF	108	6 August 2014	12 November 2026
449	Daley Blind	Netherlands	UEFA	108	6 February 2013	2 July 2024
449	**Theerathon Bunmathan**	Thailand	AFC	108	11 August 2010	17 November 2026
449	Tim Cahill	Australia	OFC / AFC^{[1]}	108	30 March 2004	20 November 2018
449	Ricardo Gardner (Note: 3 unofficial FIFA matches: Guadeloupe (1999), French Guinea and Martinique (2012).)	Jamaica	CONCACAF	108	12 February 1997	12 December 2012
449	Thomas Helveg	Denmark	UEFA	108	20 April 1994	17 October 2007
449	Stern John (Note: 7 unofficial FIFA matches: Martinique (1996, 1997, 1998, 2002) and Guadeloupe (1999, 2003, 2008).)	Trinidad and Tobago	CONCACAF	108	15 February 1995	11 November 2011
449	Jürgen Klinsmann	West Germany; Germany	UEFA	108	12 December 1987	4 July 1998
449	**Kalidou Koulibaly**	Senegal	CAF	108	5 September 2015	12 November 2026
449	Stephan Lichtsteiner	Switzerland	UEFA	108	15 November 2006	15 November 2019
449	**Kylian Mbappé**	France	UEFA	108	25 March 2017	15 November 2026
449	**Aleksandar Mitrović**	Serbia	UEFA	108	7 June 2013	16 November 2026
449	Bobby Moore	England	UEFA	108	20 May 1962	14 November 1973
449	Joseph Musonda (Note: 1 unofficial FIFA match: Zanzibar (2006).)	Zambia	CAF	108	6 July 2002	6 June 2014
449	Francisco Rodríguez	Mexico	CONCACAF	108	18 February 2004	26 July 2015
449	Rui Patrício	Portugal	UEFA	108	17 November 2010	21 March 2024
449	Rashad Sadygov (Note: 3 unofficial FIFA matches: Bulgaria, Iran U23 (2002) and Palestine (2012).)	Azerbaijan	UEFA	108	7 October 2001	5 October 2017
449	Luis Tejada	Panama	CONCACAF	108	5 August 2001	28 June 2018
449	Fan Zhiyi	China	AFC	108	22 August 1992	4 June 2002
449	Zinedine Zidane	France	UEFA	108	17 August 1994	9 July 2006
473	**Fahad Al-Hajeri**	Kuwait	AFC	107	16 October 2012	29 September 2026
473	**Juan Barrera**	Nicaragua	CONCACAF	107	22 January 2009	17 November 2026
473	Ashley Cole	England	UEFA	107	28 March 2001	5 March 2014
473	Lee Dong-gook	South Korea	AFC	107	15 May 1998	5 September 2017
473	Giovani dos Santos	Mexico	CONCACAF	107	9 September 2007	23 June 2018
473	Jonny Evans	Northern Ireland	UEFA	107	6 September 2006	8 June 2024
473	Ahmed Hadid	Oman	AFC	107	28 January 2003	5 January 2013
473	Miroslav Karhan	Slovakia	UEFA	107	6 September 1995	7 October 2011
473	Gábor Király (Note: 1 unofficial FIFA match: Bulgaria (2003).)	Hungary	UEFA	107	25 March 1998	15 November 2016
473	Aaron Mokoena	South Africa	CAF	107	20 February 1999	10 October 2010
473	Marcelo Moreno (Note: 1 unofficial FIFA match: Latvia (2011).)	Bolivia	CONMEBOL	107	12 September 2007	21 November 2023
473	**Simon Msuva**	Tanzania	CAF	107	15 August 2012	17 November 2026
473	Jamal Mubarak	Kuwait	AFC	107	13 November 1994	11 October 2006
473	Muhsin Musabah	United Arab Emirates	AFC	107	12 April 1985	27 August 1999
473	Haruna Niyonzima (Note: 4 unofficial FIFA matches: Zanzibar (2007, 2010, 2011, 2012).)	Rwanda	CAF	107	27 November 2006	3 September 2022
473	**Moisés San Nicolás**	Andorra	UEFA	107	12 October 2012	16 November 2026
473	Kim Tae-young	South Korea	AFC	107	21 October 1992	19 July 2004
473	**Marc Vales**	Andorra	UEFA	107	26 March 2008	7 June 2026
473	Patrick Vieira	France	UEFA	107	26 February 1997	2 June 2009
473	Phil Younghusband	Philippines	AFC	107	12 November 2006	16 January 2019
493	Walid Abbas	United Arab Emirates	AFC	106	27 December 2008	13 January 2023
493	Imants Bleidelis	Latvia	UEFA	106	19 May 1995	21 November 2007
493	Bobby Charlton	England	UEFA	106	19 April 1958	14 June 1970
493	**Ben Davies**	Wales	UEFA	106	12 October 2012	17 November 2026
493	Aleksandr Dmitrijev	Estonia	UEFA	106	18 February 2004	27 March 2018
493	Mohamed Elneny	Egypt	CAF	106	3 September 2011	9 December 2025
493	Hao Haidong	China	AFC	106	22 August 1992	17 November 2004
493	**Jalal Hassan**	Iraq	AFC	106	16 July 2011	26 June 2026
493	Frank Lampard	England	UEFA	106	10 October 1999	24 June 2014
493	Henrik Larsson	Sweden	UEFA	106	13 October 1993	10 October 2009
493	Joel Lindpere	Estonia	UEFA	106	1 November 1999	1 June 2016
493	Mubarak Mustafa	Qatar	AFC	106	14 May 1992	16 December 2004
493	Ivan Rakitić	Croatia	UEFA	106	8 September 2007	13 October 2019
493	Guillermo Ramírez	Guatemala	CONCACAF	106	16 April 1997	25 May 2012
493	**Tarek Salman**	Qatar	AFC	106	23 August 2017	17 November 2026
493	Diego Simeone	Argentina	CONMEBOL	106	14 July 1988	7 June 2002
493	Óscar Sonejee	Andorra	UEFA	106	22 June 1997	12 November 2015
493	Giovanni van Bronckhorst	Netherlands	UEFA	106	31 August 1996	11 July 2010
493	Eric Wynalda	United States	CONCACAF	106	2 February 1990	19 February 2000
512	Khamis Al-Dosari	Saudi Arabia	AFC	105	1 October 1994	17 December 2004
512	**Jameel Al-Yahmadi**	Oman	AFC	105	16 March 2016	14 November 2026
512	Karim Ansarifard	Iran	AFC	105	5 July 2009	3 February 2024
512	Didier Drogba	Ivory Coast	CAF	105	8 September 2002	24 June 2014
512	**Achraf Hakimi**	Morocco	CAF	105	11 October 2016	17 November 2026
512	Héctor Herrera	Mexico	CONCACAF	105	16 October 2012	9 September 2023
512	Atiba Hutchinson	Canada	CONCACAF	105	18 January 2003	15 June 2023
512	**Elseid Hysaj**	Albania	UEFA	105	6 February 2013	15 November 2026
512	Sami Hyypiä	Finland	UEFA	105	7 November 1992	12 October 2010
512	Branislav Ivanović	Serbia and Montenegro; Serbia	UEFA	105	8 June 2005	22 June 2018
512	Radhi Jaïdi	Tunisia	CAF	105	2 June 1996	6 June 2009
512	Jonatan Johansson	Finland	UEFA	105	16 March 1996	7 September 2010
512	Abdul Kadir (Note: 6 unofficial FIFA matches: Thailand, India, Israel and Burma (1972) and 2 unspecified.)	Indonesia	AFC	105	11 August 1967	7 May 1979
512	Jürgen Kohler	West Germany; Germany	UEFA	105	24 September 1986	4 July 1998
512	Lúcio	Brazil	CONMEBOL	105	15 November 2000	5 September 2011
512	**Ryan Mendes** (Note: 1 unofficial FIFA match: Guadeloupe (2022).)	Cape Verde	CAF	105	11 August 2010	17 November 2026
512	Ignatiy Nesterov	Uzbekistan	AFC	105	21 August 2002	21 January 2019
512	Stiliyan Petrov	Bulgaria	UEFA	105	23 December 1998	11 October 2011
512	Tomáš Rosický	Czech Republic	UEFA	105	23 February 2000	17 June 2016
512	**Mathew Ryan**	Australia	AFC	105	5 December 2012	3 July 2026
512	Ahmed Shobair (Note: 2 unofficial FIFA matches: Tunisia Olympic (1987 twice).)	Egypt	CAF	105	17 December 1984	8 November 1996
512	Josip Šimunić	Croatia	UEFA	105	10 November 2001	19 November 2013
512	Islam Slimani	Algeria	CAF	105	26 May 2012	9 December 2025
512	Gabriel Torres	Panama	CONCACAF	105	8 October 2005	2 June 2022
512	Domagoj Vida	Croatia	UEFA	105	23 May 2010	3 June 2024
512	Billy Wright	England	UEFA	105	28 September 1946	28 May 1959
512	Mihails Zemļinskis	Latvia	UEFA	105	8 April 1992	8 October 2005
512	Yuri Zhirkov	Russia	UEFA	105	9 February 2005	12 June 2021
540	Fahad Al Ansari	Kuwait	AFC	104	20 January 2009	6 June 2022
540	Mohammed Al-Jahani	Saudi Arabia	AFC	104	1 October 1994	11 June 2002
540	**Henri Anier**	Estonia	UEFA	104	19 June 2011	9 September 2025
540	Gustavo Cabrera	Guatemala	CONCACAF	104	19 May 2000	25 April 2012
540	Héctor Chumpitaz	Peru	CONMEBOL	104	3 April 1965	6 September 1981
540	Nader El-Sayed	Egypt	CAF	104	20 November 1992	19 June 2005
540	Radamel Falcao	Colombia	CONMEBOL	104	7 February 2007	28 March 2023
540	Ahmed Khalil	United Arab Emirates	AFC	104	6 February 2008	29 November 2019
540	Adel Khamis	Qatar	AFC	104	15 March 1985	10 March 2000
540	Dirk Kuyt	Netherlands	UEFA	104	3 September 2004	4 September 2014
540	**Wu Lei**	China	AFC	104	14 February 2010	9 June 2026
540	Per Mertesacker	Germany	UEFA	104	9 October 2004	13 July 2014
540	Sayed Mohamed Adnan	Bahrain	AFC	104	21 March 2004	15 November 2016
540	Youssef Msakni	Tunisia	CAF	104	9 January 2010	14 October 2024
540	Erasto Nyoni (Note: 2 unofficial FIFA matches: Zanzibar (2012, 2017).)	Tanzania	CAF	104	25 November 2006	14 November 2021
540	Ioannis Okkas	Cyprus	UEFA	104	15 February 1997	11 October 2011
540	Ivica Olić	Croatia	UEFA	104	13 February 2002	13 October 2015
540	**Ferjani Sassi**	Tunisia	CAF	104	8 June 2013	17 November 2026
540	**Moses Simon**	Nigeria	CAF	104	25 March 2015	17 November 2026
540	Martin Škrtel	Slovakia	UEFA	104	9 July 2004	13 October 2019
540	Hwang Sun-hong	South Korea	AFC	104	6 December 1988	20 November 2002
540	Thorbjørn Svenssen	Norway	UEFA	104	11 June 1947	16 May 1962
540	Aidil Zafuan	Malaysia	AFC	104	18 June 2007	26 March 2022
563	Faouzi Aaish	Bahrain	AFC	103	23 December 2004	11 October 2016
563	Andrei Agius	Malta	UEFA	103	25 February 2006	25 March 2022
563	**Edson Álvarez**	Mexico	CONCACAF	103	8 February 2017	5 July 2026
563	Charles Aránguiz	Chile	CONMEBOL	103	4 November 2009	25 March 2025
563	Felipe Baloy	Panama	CONCACAF	103	23 May 2001	24 June 2018
563	Franz Beckenbauer	West Germany	UEFA	103	26 September 1965	23 February 1977
563	**Fedor Černych**	Lithuania	UEFA	103	14 November 2012	17 November 2025
563	Stéphane Chapuisat	Switzerland	UEFA	103	21 June 1989	17 June 2004
563	Vedran Ćorluka	Croatia	UEFA	103	16 August 2006	11 July 2018
563	Didier Deschamps	France	UEFA	103	29 April 1989	2 September 2000
563	Kamil Glik	Poland	UEFA	103	20 January 2010	4 December 2022
563	Andi Herzog	Austria	UEFA	103	6 April 1988	30 April 2003
563	**Pierre-Emile Højbjerg**	Denmark	UEFA	103	28 May 2014	17 November 2026
563	Anzur Ismailov	Uzbekistan	AFC	103	14 July 2007	5 September 2019
563	**Alex Iwobi**	Nigeria	CAF	103	8 October 2015	17 November 2026
563	Michael Laudrup (Note: 1 unofficial Olympic match: Finland (1983).)	Denmark	UEFA	103	15 June 1982	3 July 1998
563	Ibrahim Majid	Qatar	AFC	103	25 June 2007	13 June 2017
563	James McClean	Republic of Ireland	UEFA	103	29 February 2012	21 November 2023
563	Emad Mohammed	Iraq	AFC	103	31 January 2001	28 May 2012
563	Jaroslav Plašil	Czech Republic	UEFA	103	31 March 2004	21 June 2016
563	**Andy Robertson**	Scotland	UEFA	103	5 March 2014	16 November 2026
563	Dejan Stanković	Serbia and Montenegro; Serbia	UEFA	103	22 April 1998	11 October 2013
563	Elijah Tana	Zambia	CAF	103	10 June 1995	27 January 2009
563	Michael Umaña	Costa Rica	CONCACAF	103	4 June 2004	10 October 2017
563	Māris Verpakovskis (Note: 1 unofficial FIFA match: Bolivia (2011).)	Latvia	UEFA	103	9 June 1999	29 May 2014
563	Indrek Zelinski	Estonia	UEFA	103	7 May 1994	21 May 2010
589	Hosny Abd Rabo	Egypt	CAF	102	31 March 2004	10 September 2014
589	Ismail Al-Ajmi	Oman	AFC	102	28 January 2003	19 November 2013
589	Abdulwahab Al-Safi	Bahrain	AFC	102	23 March 2009	22 January 2019
589	Fahad Awadh	Kuwait	AFC	102	27 May 2005	13 October 2015
589	Warren Barrett (Note: 6 unofficial FIFA matches: Guadeloupe (1992), Martinique (1992, 1993), Sint Maarten (1993, 1994) and Saint Lucia (1997).)	Jamaica	CONCACAF	102	18 March 1990	14 February 2000
589	Dusit Chalermsan	Thailand	AFC	102	3 October 1994	9 June 2004
589	Kenny Dalglish	Scotland	UEFA	102	10 November 1971	12 November 1986
589	**Fidel Escobar**	Panama	CONCACAF	102	8 February 2015	27 June 2026
589	Jefferson Farfán	Peru	CONMEBOL	102	23 February 2003	16 November 2021
589	**José María Giménez**	Uruguay	CONMEBOL	102	10 September 2013	17 November 2026
589	Jóhann Berg Guðmundsson	Iceland	UEFA	102	20 August 2008	25 February 2026
589	**Aymen Hussein**	Iraq	AFC	102	26 August 2015	17 November 2026
589	Park Ji-sung	South Korea	AFC	102	5 April 2000	25 January 2011
589	Martin Jørgensen	Denmark	UEFA	102	25 March 1998	15 November 2011
589	Charles Kaboré	Burkina Faso	CAF	102	7 October 2006	5 June 2021
589	Rainford Kalaba	Zambia	CAF	102	11 June 2005	18 November 2018
589	Joseph Kamwendo (Note: 2 unofficial FIFA matches: Zanzibar (2012) and Tanzania (2014).)	Malawi	CAF	102	16 August 2003	29 April 2017
589	Christopher Katongo	Zambia	CAF	102	7 June 2003	4 June 2016
589	Kasey Keller	United States	CONCACAF	102	4 February 1990	2 July 2007
589	Bülent Korkmaz	Turkey	UEFA	102	17 October 1990	17 August 2005
589	Savo Milošević	Serbia and Montenegro; Serbia	UEFA	102	23 December 1994	19 November 2008
589	**Michael Amir Murillo**	Panama	CONCACAF	102	15 March 2016	15 November 2026
589	Mario Mutsch	Luxembourg	UEFA	102	8 October 2005	2 June 2019
589	Mohamed Omar	United Arab Emirates	AFC	102	14 August 1996	28 January 2009
589	Gerard Piqué	Spain	UEFA	102	11 February 2009	1 July 2018
589	Andriy Pyatov	Ukraine	UEFA	102	22 August 2007	11 June 2022
589	Raúl	Spain	UEFA	102	9 October 1996	6 September 2006
589	**Marcel Sabitzer**	Austria	UEFA	102	5 June 2012	2 July 2026
589	Birkir Már Sævarsson	Iceland	UEFA	102	2 June 2007	14 November 2021
589	Steve Staunton	Republic of Ireland	UEFA	102	19 October 1988	16 June 2002
589	Datsakorn Thonglao	Thailand	AFC	102	14 February 2003	8 October 2017
589	Yaya Touré	Ivory Coast	CAF	102	28 April 2004	29 March 2015
589	**Trézéguet**	Egypt	CAF	102	30 August 2014	17 November 2026
589	Robin van Persie	Netherlands	UEFA	102	4 June 2005	31 August 2017
589	Mario Yepes	Colombia	CONMEBOL	102	9 February 1999	4 July 2014
589	Cho Young-jeung (Note: 11 unofficial Olympic matches: Taiwan (1975, 1976), Japan (1976 twice, 1980), Israel (1976), Malaysia (twice), Philippines, Brunei and Indonesia (1980).)	South Korea	AFC	102	19 March 1975	5 October 1986
589	Michał Żewłakow	Poland	UEFA	102	19 June 1999	29 March 2011
626	Sergio Agüero	Argentina	CONMEBOL	101	3 September 2006	3 July 2021
626	Leonel Álvarez	Colombia	CONMEBOL	101	14 February 1985	7 September 1997
626	**Ali Ashfaq**	Maldives	AFC	101	25 March 2003	4 June 2026
626	Emre Belözoğlu	Turkey	UEFA	101	23 February 2000	11 October 2019
626	Yossi Benayoun	Israel	UEFA	101	18 November 1998	9 October 2017
626	Vasiliy Berezutskiy	Russia	UEFA	101	7 June 2003	9 October 2016
626	Oleg Blokhin (Note: 11 unofficial Olympic matches: Burma, Mexico, Morocco, Poland, Denmark (1972), East Germany (1972 & 1976), Canada, North Korea, Iran and Brazil (1976).)	Soviet Union	UEFA	101	16 July 1972	21 September 1988
626	László Bölöni (Note: 1 unofficial FIFA match: Czechoslovakia (1977).)	Romania	UEFA	101	24 September 1975	1 June 1988
626	**Yassine Bounou**	Morocco	CAF	101	15 August 2013	17 November 2026
626	Joe Brincat	Malta	UEFA	101	14 October 1987	14 February 2004
626	Boštjan Cesar	Slovenia	UEFA	101	12 February 2003	27 March 2018
626	Phillip Cocu	Netherlands	UEFA	101	24 April 1996	25 June 2006
626	Daniel da Mota	Luxembourg	UEFA	101	2 June 2007	6 June 2021
626	Ulises de la Cruz	Ecuador	CONMEBOL	101	28 May 1995	16 May 2010
626	Vincent Enyeama	Nigeria	CAF	101	4 May 2002	13 June 2015
626	Kamil Grosicki	Poland	UEFA	101	2 February 2008	31 March 2026
626	Thomas Häßler	West Germany; Germany	UEFA	101	31 August 1988	20 June 2000
626	**Alireza Jahanbakhsh**	Iran	AFC	101	5 October 2013	26 June 2026
626	Mahboub Juma'a	Kuwait	AFC	101	28 March 1976	9 March 1990
626	Jaba Kankava	Georgia	UEFA	101	4 September 2004	21 March 2024
626	Seydou Keita (Note: 1 unofficial FIFA match: South Africa (2000).)	Mali	CAF	101	4 October 1998	28 January 2015
626	Levan Kobiashvili	Georgia	UEFA	101	1 September 1996	11 October 2011
626	Alyaksandr Kulchy (Note: 1 unofficial FIFA match: Romania (2004).)	Belarus	UEFA	101	14 February 1996	11 September 2012
626	Saulius Mikoliūnas	Lithuania	UEFA	101	5 June 2004	16 November 2022
626	Carlos Pavón	Honduras	CONCACAF	101	17 July 1993	16 June 2010
626	Mohammed Rabia	Oman	AFC	101	31 October 1998	9 July 2011
626	Ronald Raldes	Bolivia	CONMEBOL	101	3 June 2001	9 June 2018
626	Cristian Riveros	Paraguay	CONMEBOL	101	4 May 2005	27 March 2018
626	Thomas Sørensen	Denmark	UEFA	101	17 November 1999	26 May 2012
626	Earnie Stewart	United States	CONCACAF	101	19 December 1990	18 August 2004
626	Park Sung-hwa	South Korea	AFC	101	29 July 1975	10 December 1984
626	Cláudio Taffarel	Brazil	CONMEBOL	101	7 July 1988	12 July 1998
626	Andranik Teymourian	Iran	AFC	101	24 August 2005	11 October 2016
626	**Jane Thabantso**	Lesotho	CAF	101	19 November 2014	29 March 2026
626	Vasilis Torosidis	Greece	UEFA	101	24 March 2007	5 September 2019
626	Harold Wallace	Costa Rica	CONCACAF	101	27 September 1995	12 August 2009
626	Joseph Yobo	Nigeria	CAF	101	24 March 2001	30 June 2014
626	**Sarach Yooyen**	Thailand	AFC	101	19 November 2013	17 November 2026
664	Mohamed Aboutrika	Egypt	CAF	100	19 March 2001	19 November 2013
664	Roberto Acuña	Paraguay	CONMEBOL	100	3 March 1993	11 June 2011
664	Hani Al-Dhabit	Oman	AFC	100	25 March 1997	14 November 2014
664	Abdulaziz Al-Muqbali	Oman	AFC	100	11 October 2011	12 October 2021
664	Angelos Basinas	Greece	UEFA	100	18 August 1999	1 April 2009
664	Henning Berg	Norway	UEFA	100	13 May 1992	27 May 2004
664	Roderick Briffa	Malta	UEFA	100	11 December 2003	17 November 2018
664	Denis Caniza	Paraguay	CONMEBOL	100	10 November 1996	7 September 2010
664	Luis Capurro	Ecuador	CONMEBOL	100	6 February 1985	9 February 2003
664	**Rohit Chand** (Note: 2 unrecognised FIFA matches: India Olympic (2009) and Northern Mariana Islands (2013).)	Nepal	AFC	100	26 March 2009	31 March 2026
664	Christian Cueva	Peru	CONMEBOL	100	1 June 2011	29 June 2024
664	Aleksandar Dragović	Austria	UEFA	100	6 June 2009	29 March 2022
664	Damien Duff	Republic of Ireland	UEFA	100	15 March 1998	18 June 2012
664	**Jóan Símun Edmundsson**	Faroe Islands	UEFA	100	12 August 2009	18 November 2025
664	**Khalid Eisa**	United Arab Emirates	AFC	100	6 October 2011	17 November 2026
664	Alexandru Epureanu	Moldova	UEFA	100	6 September 2006	31 March 2021
664	**Remo Freuler**	Switzerland	UEFA	100	25 March 2017	16 November 2026
664	**Lars Gerson**	Luxembourg	UEFA	100	26 March 2008	10 June 2025
664	Bojan Jokić	Slovenia	UEFA	100	28 February 2006	16 November 2019
664	Ulf Kirsten	East Germany; Germany	UEFA	100	8 May 1985	20 June 2000
664	Rúnar Kristinsson (Note: 4 unofficial Olympic matches: Netherlands, East Germany, Portugal (1988) and England (1991).)	Iceland	UEFA	100	28 October 1987	18 August 2004
664	Grzegorz Krychowiak	Poland	UEFA	100	14 December 2008	10 September 2023
664	Tony Meola	United States	CONCACAF	100	10 June 1988	11 April 2006
664	Joe-Max Moore	United States	CONCACAF	100	3 September 1992	14 June 2002
664	Peter Mponda (Note: 2 unofficial FIFA matches: Kenya (2000) and Guinea (2001).)	Malawi	CAF	100	3 January 1998	8 October 2011
664	Haitham Mustafa	Sudan	CAF	100	19 October 1998	14 October 2012
664	Nazri Nasir	Singapore	AFC	100	13 September 1990	12 July 2004
664	Carles Puyol	Spain	UEFA	100	15 November 2000	6 February 2013
664	Robinho	Brazil	CONMEBOL	100	13 July 2003	26 January 2017
664	Ruslan Rotan	Ukraine	UEFA	100	12 February 2003	27 March 2018
664	Noor Sabri	Iraq	AFC	100	22 July 2002	27 March 2018
664	Goce Sedloski	North Macedonia	UEFA	100	27 March 1996	29 May 2010
664	Dario Šimić	Croatia	UEFA	100	13 March 1996	20 August 2008
664	Santokh Singh (Note: 19 unofficial FIFA matches; 15 Olympic matches: Papua New Guinea, North Korea (1976), Singapore (1976, 1983), Indonesia (1976, 1983 twice), South Korea (twice), Brunei, Japan, Philippines (1980), India (twice), Saudi Arabia (1983), and 4 unspecified.)	Malaysia	AFC	100	19 May 1973	8 April 1984
664	Jorge Soto (Note: 1 unofficial FIFA match: Slovakia (1995).)	Peru	CONMEBOL	100	25 November 1992	12 October 2005
664	Igors Stepanovs	Latvia	UEFA	100	26 April 1995	10 August 2011
664	Taijo Teniste	Estonia	UEFA	100	9 November 2007	9 September 2025
664	Siaka Tiéné	Ivory Coast	CAF	100	9 April 2000	14 June 2015
664	Arda Turan	Turkey	UEFA	100	16 August 2006	6 October 2017
664	**Virgil van Dijk**	Netherlands	UEFA	100	10 October 2015	4 October 2026
664	**Matteo Vitaioli**	San Marino	UEFA	100	17 October 2007	18 November 2025

Notes
^{1} Australia joined the AFC from the OFC on 1 January 2006 when Mark Schwarzer had 36 caps and Tim Cahill had 14 caps. The most capped men's footballer from the OFC is Chris Wood of New Zealand with 97 caps.

Fandi Ahmad, Marvin Andrews, Lakhdar Belloumi, Jonathan Billie, József Bozsik, Durrant Brown, David Chabala, Jack Chamangwana, Young Chimodzi, Gilbert Chirwa, Godfrey Chitalu, Alex Chola, Hans-Jürgen Dörner, Falah Hassan, Ari Hjelm, Joevin Jones, Emmanuel Kundé, Grzegorz Lato, Borislav Mihaylov, Akhtam Nazarov, Mrisho Ngasa, Felix Nyirongo, Morten Olsen, Marvin Phillip, Kinnah Phiri, Piyapong Pue-on, Ahmed Radhi, Donovan Ricketts, Hussein Saeed, Choi Soon-ho, Joachim Streich, Jermaine Taylor, Andris Vaņins, Godfrey Walusimbi, Harry Waya, Lawrence Waya, Andy Williams and Rabie Yassin have all appeared in 100 or more matches for their nation, however some of these caps are not recognised as official by FIFA, and do not reach the 100 FIFA recognised caps' threshold required to be included in this table.

== Players by nations ==
As of 17 November 2026

Players	Nation	Confederation
19	Mexico	CONCACAF
18	Bahrain	AFC
18	Saudi Arabia	AFC
17	Egypt	CAF
17	Estonia	UEFA
17	United States	CONCACAF
16	South Korea	AFC
15	Germany / West Germany	UEFA
15	Oman	AFC
15	Qatar	AFC
14	Kuwait	AFC
14	Panama	CONCACAF
13	Spain	UEFA
13	United Arab Emirates	AFC
12	Costa Rica	CONCACAF
12	Croatia	UEFA
11	Denmark	UEFA
11	Iraq	AFC
11	Jordan	AFC
11	Netherlands	UEFA
11	Singapore	AFC
11	Sweden	UEFA
10	England	UEFA
10	France	UEFA
10	Iran	AFC
10	Peru	CONMEBOL
9	Brazil	CONMEBOL
9	Chile	CONMEBOL
9	Uruguay	CONMEBOL
8	Argentina	CONMEBOL
8	Belgium	UEFA
8	Italy	UEFA
8	Japan	AFC
8	Malaysia	AFC
8	Portugal	UEFA
8	Switzerland	UEFA
7	China	AFC
7	Colombia	CONMEBOL
7	Ecuador	CONMEBOL
7	Ivory Coast	CAF
7	Latvia	UEFA
7	Malta	UEFA
7	Paraguay	CONMEBOL
7	Poland	UEFA
7	Republic of Ireland	UEFA
7	Thailand	AFC
6	Andorra	UEFA
6	Honduras	CONCACAF
6	Turkey	UEFA
5	Austria	UEFA
5	Finland	UEFA
5	Greece	UEFA
5	Iceland	UEFA
5	Jamaica	CONCACAF
5	Liechtenstein	UEFA
5	Nigeria	CAF
5	Romania	UEFA
5	Russia / CIS	UEFA
5	Serbia / Serbia and Montenegro	UEFA
5	Slovakia	UEFA
5	Ukraine	UEFA
5	Uzbekistan	AFC
5	Zambia	CAF

Players	Nation	Confederation
4	Cameroon	CAF
4	Czech Republic	UEFA
4	Luxembourg	UEFA
4	Northern Ireland	UEFA
4	Venezuela	CONMEBOL
4	Wales	UEFA
3	Algeria	CAF
3	Australia	OFC / AFC
3	Gabon	CAF
3	Georgia	UEFA
3	Ghana	CAF
3	Guatemala	CONCACAF
3	Morocco	CAF
3	Norway	UEFA
3	Senegal	CAF
3	Tunisia	CAF
2	Bolivia	CONMEBOL
2	Bosnia and Herzegovina	UEFA
2	Cuba	CONCACAF
2	Hungary	UEFA
2	Lebanon	AFC
2	Lithuania	UEFA
2	Maldives	AFC
2	North Macedonia	UEFA
2	Malawi	CAF
2	Nepal	AFC
2	Nicaragua	CONCACAF
2	Scotland	UEFA
2	Slovenia	UEFA
2	Syria	AFC
2	Tanzania	CAF
2	Trinidad and Tobago	CONCACAF
1	Albania	UEFA
1	Armenia	UEFA
1	Azerbaijan	UEFA
1	Belarus	UEFA
1	Bulgaria	UEFA
1	Burkina Faso	CAF
1	Canada	CONCACAF
1	Cape Verde	CAF
1	Cyprus	UEFA
1	DR Congo	CAF
1	El Salvador	CONCACAF
1	Faroe Islands	UEFA
1	Hong Kong	AFC
1	India	AFC
1	Indonesia	AFC
1	Israel	UEFA
1	Lesotho	CAF
1	Mali	CAF
1	Moldova	UEFA
1	Mozambique	CAF
1	North Korea	AFC
1	Philippines	AFC
1	Rwanda	CAF
1	San Marino	UEFA
1	South Africa	CAF
1	Soviet Union	UEFA
1	Sudan	CAF
704	122	5

== Players by confederations ==
As of 17 November 2026

Players	Confederation	Nations
277	UEFA	52
203	AFC	26
84	CONCACAF	12
72	CONMEBOL	10
68	CAF	22
704	5	122

== See also ==
- List of men's footballers with 1,000 or more official appearances
- List of top international women's football goalscorers by country
- List of women's footballers with 100 or more international goals
- List of women's footballers with 100 or more international caps
- List of top international men's football goalscorers by country
- List of men's footballers with 50 or more international goals
- List of men's footballers with 500 or more goals
- Progression of association football caps record
