= 1980 CECAFA Cup =

Tournament details
- Host country: Sudan
- Dates: November 14–28
- Teams: 7 (from CECAFA confederations)

Final positions
- Champions: Sudan (1st title)
- Runners-up: Tanzania

Tournament statistics
- Matches played: 13
- Goals scored: 24 (1.85 per match)

The 1980 CECAFA Cup was the 8th edition of the tournament. It was held in Sudan, and was won by hosts. The matches were played between November 14–28.

== Group A ==
| Team | Pts | Pld | W | D | L | GF | GA | GD |
|---|---|---|---|---|---|---|---|---|
| Tanzania | 3 | 2 | 1 | 1 | 0 | 2 | 1 | +1 |
| Sudan | 2 | 2 | 1 | 0 | 1 | 2 | 1 | +1 |
| Somalia | 1 | 2 | 0 | 1 | 1 | 1 | 3 | –2 |

November 14, 1980

| Sudan | 0–1 | Tanzania |

Khartoum

November 17, 1980

| Tanzania | 1–1 | Somalia |

Khartoum

November 20, 1980

| Sudan | 2–0 | Somalia |
|---|---|---|
| Ammar; Aljili |

Khartoum

== Group B ==
| Team | Pts | Pld | W | D | L | GF | GA | GD |
|---|---|---|---|---|---|---|---|---|
| Zambia | 5 | 3 | 2 | 1 | 0 | 6 | 2 | +4 |
| Malawi | 4 | 3 | 2 | 0 | 1 | 4 | 3 | +1 |
| Zanzibar | 3 | 3 | 1 | 0 | 2 | 2 | 5 | –3 |
| Kenya | 1 | 3 | 0 | 1 | 2 | 1 | 3 | –2 |

November 16, 1980

| Malawi | 1–0 | Zanzibar |

Port Sudan

November 16, 1980

| Kenya | 0–0 | Zambia |

Port Sudan

November 19, 1980

| Malawi | 1–0 | Kenya |
|---|---|---|
| Dandize |

Port Sudan

November 19, 1980

| Zambia | 3–0 | Zanzibar |

Port Sudan

November 22, 1980

| Zambia | 3–2 | Malawi |
|---|---|---|
| | | Chamangwana; Waya |

Port Sudan

November 16, 1980

| Kenya | 1–2 | Zanzibar |

Port Sudan

== Semi-finals ==
November 24, 1980

| Tanzania | 1–0 | Malawi |

November 25, 1980

| Sudan | 2–1 | Zambia |
|---|---|---|
| Ammar; Sami |

== Third place match ==
November 27, 1980

| Malawi | 1–0 | Zambia |
|---|---|---|
| Gondwe |

== Final ==
November 28, 1980

| Sudan | 1–0 | Tanzania |
|---|---|---|
| Ebrahim 67' |
