= 1978 CECAFA Cup =

Tournament details
- Host country: Malawi
- Dates: November 1–19
- Teams: 5

Final positions
- Champions: Malawi (1st title)
- Runners-up: Zambia

Tournament statistics
- Matches played: 14
- Goals scored: 45 (3.21 per match)
- Top scorer: (Zambia) Godfrey Chitalu (11 goals)

The 1978 CECAFA Cup was the 6th edition of the tournament. It was held in Malawi, and was won by the hosts. The matches were played between November 1 and 19.

== Group stage ==
Team	Pts	Pld	W	D	L	GF	GA	GD
Zambia	6	4	3	0	1	16	3	+13
Malawi	6	4	3	0	1	6	4	+2
Uganda	5	4	2	1	1	6	4	+2
Kenya	2	4	1	0	3	1	11	–10
Somalia	1	4	0	1	3	3	10	–7

November 1, 1978

Malawi	1–0	Kenya
Kaimfa 79'

November 3, 1978

Malawi	3–1	Somalia
Phiri; Chikafa; Gondwe		Goal

November 5, 1978

Malawi	0–2	Uganda

November 7, 1978

Zambia	2–1	Uganda
Chitalu; Chola

November 9, 1978

Zambia	4–0	Somalia
Chitalu; Chola ?

November 9, 1978

Kenya	0–1	Uganda

November 11, 1978

Malawi	2–1	Zambia
Phiri; Chikafa		Chola

November 11, 1978

Kenya	1–0	Somalia

November 13, 1978

Kenya	0–9	Zambia
		Chitalu; Chola; Kalambo; Simulambo ?

November 13, 1978

Somalia	2–2	Uganda

== Semi-finals ==
November 17, 1978

Malawi	2–0	Kenya
Thewe 43'; Phiri 87'

November 17, 1978

Zambia	4–0	Uganda
Chitalu

== Third place match ==
November 19, 1978

Kenya	2–0	Uganda
Adero ?

== Final ==
November 19, 1978

Malawi	3–2	Zambia
Gondwe 3'; Billie 77'; Phiri 89'		Chitalu ?
