= Phiri =

Loya may refer to:mal

- Phiri, a clan of the Chewa people
- Phiri (surname), a surname
- Phiri, Soweto, a township in Soweto, Johannesburg, South Africa
