= Malambo East =

National Assembly constituency in Zambia

Malambo East is a constituency of the National Assembly of Zambia. It was created in 2026 when Malambo constituency was split into two constituencies (Malambo West and Malambo East). It covers the eastern part of Mambwe District.

== List of MPs ==
Election year	MP	Party
Malambo East
2026	Faith Lungu	Independent
