= Young Chimodzi =

Malawian footballer (born 1961)

Personal information
- Date of birth: 1 August 1961 (age 65)
- Position: Defender

Senior career*
Years	Team	Apps	(Gls)
?–1999	Silver Strikers FC		

International career
1979–1995	Malawi	159	(13)

Managerial career
- 1999–2000: Malawi
- 2014–2015: Malawi
- * Club domestic league appearances and goals

Young Chimodzi (born 1 August 1961) is a Malawian football manager and former player.

== Career ==
A defender, he made 159 appearances for the Malawi national team and won a bronze medal with Malawi at the 1987 All-Africa Games in Nairobi. At club level he played for Silver Strikers FC, captaining the team until 1999.

He later managed the Malawi national team between 1999 and 2000, and later again between January 2014 and June 2015.

== See also ==
- List of men's footballers with 100 or more international caps
