= Jack Chamangwana =

Malawian footballer (1957–2018)

Personal information
- Date of birth: 30 April 1957
- Date of death: 6 May 2018 (aged 61)
- Place of death: Blantyre, Malawi
- Position: Defender

Senior career*
Years	Team	Apps	(Gls)
1975–1986	Wanderers		
1986–1989	Kaizer Chiefs		

International career
1975–1985	Malawi	133	(10)

Managerial career
- 1998–1999: Malawi
- 2007: Young Africans
- * Club domestic league appearances and goals

Jack Chamangwana (30 April 1957 – 6 May 2018) was a Malawian footballer who played as a defender for Wanderers and South African club Kaizer Chiefs. He made 133 appearances for the Malawi national team, scoring 10 goals. He was nicknamed 'Africa' in Malawi and 'Black Stone' in South Africa.

== Career ==
Chamangwana made his debut for the Malawi national team against Kenya in an international friendly match on 10 July 1975 and made his final appearance was 16 April 1985 against Mozambique in a 1986 African Cup of Nations qualification game.

He was involved in the 1978 FIFA World Cup qualification and 1986 FIFA World Cup qualification campaigns. He also played in the 1984 African Cup of Nations tournament for Malawi and the 1979, 1980, 1982 and 1983 editions of the CECAFA Cup.

Between 1986 and 1989, he played for South African club Kaizer Chiefs.

In 2007, he coached Tanzanian team Young Africans.

He died on 6 May 2018.

== See also ==
- List of men's footballers with 100 or more international caps
