= Faith Lungu =

Member of Parliament
- Incumbent
- Assumed office 15 August 2026
- Preceded by: Constituency established
- Constituency: Malambo East

Personal details
- Party: Independent

Faith Lungu (also known as Faith Lungu Bury) is a Zambian politician who has served as the independent member of parliament for Malambo East constituency in Eastern Province since August 2026.

== Political career ==
=== 2026 parliamentary election ===
Lungu contested the Malambo East constituency in the 2026 general election as an independent candidate. She received 7,118 votes, defeating Mike Mposha of the United Party for National Development, a former member of parliament for Munali constituency in Lusaka District, who received 5,091 votes.

Malambo East was a newly created constituency in Mambwe District, Eastern Province, and Lungu became its first member of parliament also making her the first woman elected to represent the constituency.

=== Reported threats ===
Following the election, Lungu reported receiving threats against herself and her supporters and called on the Zambia Police Service to ensure their safety. She also said she intended to represent women and girls in Malambo East.
