= Peter Phiri =

Peter Phiri may refer to:

- Peter Phiri (footballer) (c.1938–2023), Zimbabwean footballer and later coach at Rio Tinto FC
- Peter Phiri (politician, born 1973), Zambian politician and MP for Mkaika
- Peter Phiri (politician, born 1974), Zambian politician and MP for Malambo
