= Peter Phiri (politician) =

Zambian politician

Provincial Minister for Eastern Province
- In office 7 September 2021 – 15 May 2026
- President: Hakainde Hichilema
- Preceded by: Makebi Zulu

Member of the National Assembly for Malambo
- In office August 2021 – 15 May 2026
- Preceded by: Makebi Zulu

Personal details
- Born: 18 February 1974 (age 52) Lusaka, Zambia
- Party: United Party for National Development
- Occupation: Politician

Peter Simon Phiri (born 18 February 1974) is a Zambian politician. He was the member of parliament for Malambo constituency from 2021 to 2026.

== Political career ==
Phiri stood as the United Party for National Development candidate at the August 2021 general election in Malambo constituency and was elected. The following month, President Hakainde Hichilema appointed him as the Provincial Minister for the Eastern Province.

Ahead of the 2026 general election, Malambo constituency was split into two constituencies, namely Malambo West and Malambo East. Phiri was adopted as the UPND candidate in Malambo West. At the election, he finished second to Patrick Mwale of the National Reconciliation Party for Unity and Prosperity.
