= Malambo (constituency) =

Constituency of the National Assembly of Zambia

Malambo was a constituency of the National Assembly of Zambia. It covered Mambwe and Mfuwe in Mambwe District of Eastern Province.

== List of MPs ==
Election year	MP	Party
1968	Raphael Sakala	United National Independence Party
1973	Whitson Banda	United National Independence Party
1978	Whitson Banda	United National Independence Party
1983	Morris Chulu	United National Independence Party
1988	Wezi Kaunda	United National Independence Party
1991	Wezi Kaunda	United National Independence Party
1996	Bertram Mmembe	Movement for Multi-Party Democracy
2001	Imange Phiri	United National Independence Party
2006	Maxwell Mwale	Movement for Multi-Party Democracy
2011	Maxwell Mwale	Movement for Multi-Party Democracy
2015 (by-election)	Jacob Shuma	Patriotic Front
2016	Makebi Zulu	Patriotic Front
2021	Peter Phiri	United Party for National Development
Seat abolished (split into Malambo East and Malambo West)
