= John Phiri =

John Phiri may refer to:

- John Phiri (footballer) (born 1962), Zimbabwean footballer
- John Phiri (politician), Zambian politician in the Ministry of Local Government
- John Phiri, Malawian weightlifter at the Weightlifting at the 2014 Commonwealth Games – Men's 69 kg
- John Phiri, Gaelic football player in the 2024 Irish National Football League
