= Malawi national football team =

Malawi
- Nickname: The Flames
- Association: Football Association of Malawi (FAM)
- Confederation: CAF (Africa)
- Sub-confederation: COSAFA (Southern Africa)
- Head coach: Callisto Pasuwa
- Captain: John Banda
- Most caps: Young Chimodzi (159)
- Top scorer: Kinnah Phiri (71)
- Home stadium: Bingu National Stadium
- FIFA code: MWI
| First colours | Second colours | Third colours |

FIFA ranking
- Current: 130 ▲1 (18 November 2026)
- Highest: 53 (December 1992)
- Lowest: 138 (December 2007, March 2008)

First international
- Nyasaland 0–5 Northern Rhodesia (Malawi; 1957)

Biggest win
- Malawi 8–1 Botswana (Malawi; 13 July 1968); Malawi 8–1 Djibouti (Blantyre, Malawi; 31 May 2008)

Biggest defeat
- Nyasaland 0–12 Gold Coast (Nyasaland; 15 October 1962)

Africa Cup of Nations
- Appearances: 3 (first in 1984)
- Best result: Round of 16 (2021)

COSAFA Cup
- Appearances: 19 (first in 1997)
- Best result: Runners-up (2002, 2003)
Medal record
COSAFA Cup
| Silver medal – second place | 2002 Southern Africa |
| Silver medal – second place | 2003 Southern Africa |
CECAFA Cup
| Gold medal – first place | 1978 Malawi |
| Gold medal – first place | 1979 Kenya |
| Gold medal – first place | 1988 Malawi |
| Silver medal – second place | 1975 Zambia |
| Silver medal – second place | 1984 Uganda |
| Silver medal – second place | 1989 Kenya |
| Bronze medal – third place | 1977 Somalia |
| Bronze medal – third place | 1980 Sudan |
| Bronze medal – third place | 1985 Zimbabwe |

The Malawi national football team (Chichewa: Timu ya dziko la Malawi) represents Malawi in association football and is controlled by the Football Association of Malawi. Before 1966, it was known as the Nyasaland national football team.

Known as the Flames, Malawi has qualified for three Africa Cup of Nations, in 1984, 2010 and 2021. They also won the CECAFA Cup in 1978, 1979 and 1988 and finished fourth in the 2024 Four Nations Football Tournament.

== History ==
=== Coaches ===
The first full-time coach of the Malawi national football team was Ron Meades. The British Council arranged for his appointment through the English Football Association to coach the team for the Republic Celebrations, playing Madagascar and Zambia. Ray Batchelor was coach for four years from 11 November 1967 to 10 October 1971, guiding the team in 23 friendly matches and two Olympic Games. Players during this time included future coaches in Henry Moyo, Brian Griffin, and Yasin Osman. Other coaches included Brazilian Wander Moreira, British Ted Powell, and the first locally-born coach, Alex Masanjala, who was appointed as an interim before Henry Moyo. Moyo was the first former national player to coach the Flames, and stayed in the position for five years. As of January 2019, only nine coaches had been in charge for more than 20 games. The most successful coaches were Powell, Moyo, and Kim Splidsboel (2000–2002) from Denmark.

=== Tournaments ===
Malawi first qualified for an African Cup of Nations in 1984, when only eight teams competed in the tournament in Ivory Coast. After a 3-0 defeat against Algeria, World Cup participants in 1982 and 1986, the Malawi drew 2-2 in the second game against eventual finalists Nigeria. With a 0–1 loss against Ghana, Malawi ended the group stage with 1 point at the bottom of the table and was eliminated from the tournament.

After 26 years, Malawi took part in an Africa Cup of Nations again in 2010. The team benefited from the fact that the continental elimination round for the 2010 FIFA World Cup also served as the qualifying round for AFCON. In the group matches of the third round, Malawi, third place behind Côte d'Ivoire and Burkina Faso and with a record of only four points and 4–11 goal difference, was enough to make it to the continental finals.

At the tournament in Angola, Kinnah Phiri's team caused a big surprise. In the first group game, Malawi defeated Algeria, which had qualified for the World Cup, 3-0. One of the goalscorers was striker Russel Mwafulirwa, who at the time was under contract for the Swedish first division club IFK Norrköping and was thus one of only two players in the 23-man squad active in Europe. Malawi lost the second game against hosts Angola, 2-0.

For Malawi to have reached the quarter-finals for the first time, a draw in the last group game would have been enough. However, the team lost 3-1 to Mali. After just three minutes, the Malawians were 2-0 down, a goal from Mwafulirwa did nothing to avert the team's elimination.

== Results and fixtures ==
The following is a list of match results in the last 12 months, as well as any future matches that have been scheduled.

Win Draw Loss Fixture

=== 2025 ===
| 15 November Friendly | Malawi | 0–0 | Lesotho | Bloemfontein, South Africa |
| 16:00 UTC+2 | | Report | | Stadium: Toyota Stadium |

| 18 November Friendly | Malawi | 1–0 | Lesotho | Bloemfontein, South Africa |
| 16:00 UTC+2 | Malango 25' | Report | | Stadium: Toyota Stadium |

=== 2026 ===
| 28 March 2026 Four Nations Tournament semi-final | Zambia | 0–0 (9–8 p) | Malawi | Francistown, Botsuana |
| 15:00 UTC+2 | | Report | | Stadium: Obed Itani Chilume Stadium; Referee: Keabetswe Dintwa (Botswana) |
| | Penalties |
| | | | (penalty missed) Mpinganjira; (penalty missed) Kondowe |

| 31 March 2026 Four Nations Tournament 3rd place match | Malawi | 0–1 | Botswana | Francistown, Botsuana |
| 15:00 UTC+2 | | Report | Moloi 66' | Stadium: Obed Itani Chilume Stadium; Referee: Owen Manenda (Zimbabwe) |

| 6 June Friendly | Ethiopia | 1–0 | Malawi | Dire Dawa, Ethiopia |
| 18:00 UTC+3 | Tilahun 1' | Report | | Stadium: Dire Dawa Stadium; Referee: Mohamed Diraneh (Djibouti) |

| 9 June Friendly | Ethiopia | 1–1 | Malawi | Dire Dawa, Ethiopia |
| 19:00 UTC+3 | Demte 42' | Report | Adepoju 19' | Stadium: Dire Dawa Stadium |

| 25 September 2027 AFCON qualification | Malawi | 2–1 | South Sudan | Lilongwe, Malawi |
| 18:00 UTC+2 | Adepoju 20'; Njaliwa 64' | Report | Dhata 48' | Stadium: Bingu National Stadium; Referee: Vincent Kaboré (Burkina Faso) |

| 6 October 2027 AFCON qualification | Angola | 3–1 | Malawi | Talatona, Angola |
| 20:00 UTC+1 | Milson 3'; Mabululu 38'; Miro 70' | Report | Gaspar 45+2' (o.g.) | Stadium: 11 November Stadium; Referee: Gerson Adolfo Micó Esono Angono (Equatorial Guinea) |

| 13 November 2027 AFCON qualification | Egypt | 5–0 | Malawi | Cairo, Egypt |
| 21:00 UTC+2 | Maher 6'; Marmoush 10'; Hany 39'; Salah 84', 90+5' (pen.) | Report | | Stadium: Cairo International Stadium; Referee: Abdelaziz Mohamed Bouh (Mauritania) |

| 17 November 2027 AFCON qualification | Malawi | 0–0 | Egypt | Lilongwe, Malawi |
| 14:00 UTC+2 | | Report | | Stadium: Bingu National Stadium; Referee: Lucky Razake Kasalirwe (Uganda) |

=== 2027 ===
| 24 March 2027 AFCON qualification | South Sudan | v | Malawi | TBD, South Sudan |
| TBD | | | | Stadium: TBD |

| 28 March 2027 AFCON qualification | Malawi | v | Angola | TBD, Malawi |
| TBD | | | | Stadium: TBD |

== Coaching staff ==
| Position | Name |
|---|---|
| Head Coach | (Zimbabwe) Callisto Pasuwa |
| 1st Assistant coach | (Malawi) Peter Mponda |
| 2nd Assistant coach | (Malawi) Macdonald Mtetemela |
| Goalkeeping coach | (Malawi) Simplex Nthala |
| Team manager | (Malawi) James Sangala |
| Fitness Coach | (Malawi) Peter Mgangira |
| Technical Adviser | (Malawi) Aubrey Nankhuni |
| Data Analyst | (Malawi) Taonga Chimodzi |
| Physiotherapist | (Malawi) Dexter Killi |
| Team Doctor | (Malawi) Dr. Levison Mwale |
| Kitmaster | (South Sudan) Richard Justin Lado |
| Media Manager | (Malawi) Gomegzani Zakazaka |
| Chaplain | (Malawi) Chancy Gondwe |
| Assistant Technical Manager | (Malawi) Steve Madeira |

=== Coaching history ===
Caretaker coaches are listed in italics

- (Malawi) Jack Chamangwana (1998–99)
- (Malawi) Young Chimodzi (1999–00)
- (Denmark) Kim Splidsboel (2000–02)
- (England) Alan Gillett (2003)
- (Malawi) Edington Ng'onamo (2003–04)
- (Malawi) John Kaputa (2004)
- (Malawi) Yassin Osman (2004–05)
- (England) Michael Hennigan (2005)
- (Germany) Burkhard Ziese (2005–06)
- (Malawi) Kinnah Phiri (2006–07)
- (England) Stephen Constantine (2007–08)
- (Malawi) Kinnah Phiri (2009–12)
- (Malawi) Edington Ng'onamo (2012–13)
- (Belgium) Tom Saintfiet (2013)
- (Malawi) Young Chimodzi (2014–15)
- (Malawi) Ernest Mtawali (2015–16)
- (Burundi) Ramadhan Nsanzurwimo (2016–17)
- (Malawi) Gerald Phiri Sr. (2017)
- (Belgium) Ronny Van Geneugden (2017–19)
- (Malawi) Meke Mwase (2019–2021)
- (Romania) Mario Marinică (2021–2023)
- (Malawi) Patrick Mabedi (2023–2024)
- (Zimbabwe) Kalisto Pasuwa (2024–present)

== Players ==
=== Current squad ===
The following players were named to the squad for the 2027 Africa Cup of Nations qualification matches South Sudan and Angola on 25 September and 5 October 2026; respectively.

Caps and goals correct as of 9 June 2026, after the match against Ethiopia.

| No. | Pos. | Player | Date of birth (age) | Caps | Goals | Club |
|---|---|---|---|---|---|---|
| | GK | William Thole | 2 October 1998 (age 28) | 12 | 0 | (Zimbabwe Football Association) Simba Bhora |
| | GK | George Chikooka | 4 April 1997 (age 29) | 8 | 0 | (Football Association of Malawi) Silver Strikers |
| | GK | Precious Masamba | | 0 | 0 | (Football Association of Malawi) Blue Eagles |
| | DF | Dennis Chembezi | 15 September 1997 (age 29) | 58 | 0 | (Iraq Football Association) North Refineries |
| | DF | Gomezgani Chirwa | 25 September 1996 (age 30) | 24 | 0 | (Zimbabwe Football Association) Ngezi Platinum |
| | DF | Emmanuel Nyirenda | 31 January 2000 (age 26) | 3 | 0 | (Football Association of Malawi) Mighty Wanderers |
| | DF | Blessings Mpokera | 2 April 2002 (age 24) | 2 | 0 | (Football Association of Malawi) Nyasa Big Bullets |
| | DF | Ajussa Kalowa | | 0 | 0 | (Football Association of Malawi) Blue Eagles |
| | DF | Peter N'Gambi | | 0 | 0 | (Football Association of Malawi) Mighty Wanderers |
| | DF | Macdonald Rameck | | 0 | 0 | (Zimbabwe Football Association) Hardrock |
| | MF | Charles Petro | 8 February 2001 (age 25) | 30 | 0 | (Romanian Football Federation) Botoșani |
| | MF | Lloyd Njaliwa | 24 May 1998 (age 28) | 18 | 0 | (Zimbabwe Football Association) CAPS United |
| | MF | Francisco Madinga | 11 February 2000 (age 26) | 14 | 0 | (Football Association of Zambia) Kansanshi Dynamos |
| | MF | Yankho Singo | 1 April 2000 (age 26) | 7 | 0 | (Football Association of Malawi) Nyasa Big Bullets |
| | MF | Blessings Singini | 19 July 1995 (age 31) | 2 | 0 | (Football Association of Malawi) Mighty Wanderers |
| | MF | Festus Duwe | 7 June 2003 (age 23) | 1 | 0 | (Football Association of Malawi) Silver Strikers |
| | MF | Mwisho Mhango | 15 September 2007 (age 19) | 1 | 0 | (German Football Association) Hannover 96 |
| | MF | Washali Jaziya | 12 February 2006 (age 20) | 0 | 0 | (Japan Football Association) Nankatsu |
| | MF | Blessings Kanowa | 6 May 2006 (age 20) | 0 | 0 | (Japan Football Association) Nankatsu |
| | MF | Oscar Petro | 2 September 2005 (age 21) | 0 | 0 | (Football Association of Malawi) Civil Service United |
| | FW | Richard Mbulu | 25 January 1994 (age 32) | 40 | 5 | (Mozambican Football Federation) Costa do Sol |
| | FW | Wisdom Mpinganjira | 8 July 2002 (age 24) | 18 | 0 | (Mozambican Football Federation) Black Bulls |
| | FW | Patrick Mwaungulu | 18 February 2002 (age 24) | 13 | 0 | (Congolese Association Football Federation) TP Mazembe |
| | FW | Chifundo Mphasi | 17 October 2004 (age 22) | 12 | 2 | (Football Association of Zambia) Power Dynamos |
| | FW | Mayele Malango | 25 February 1997 (age 29) | 7 | 1 | (United States Soccer Federation) Sacramento Republic |
| | FW | Gaddie Chirwa | 30 November 1997 (age 28) | 7 | 0 | (Football Association of Malawi) Mighty Wanderers |
| | FW | Babatunde Adepoju | 21 November 1995 (age 30) | 5 | 0 | (Mozambican Football Federation) Costa do Sol |
| | FW | Ephraim Kondowe | 2 January 2002 (age 24) | 1 | 0 | (Football Association of Malawi) Nyasa Big Bullets |
| | FW | Jorden Kananga | 3 October 2003 (age 23) | 0 | 0 | Free agent |
| | FW | Shaquille Gwengwe | 28 March 2001 (age 25) | 0 | 0 | (Football Association of Wales) Newport County |

=== Recent call-ups ===
The following players have been called up in 12 months preceding the above draft.

| Pos. | Player | Date of birth (age) | Caps | Goals | Club | Latest call-up |
|---|---|---|---|---|---|---|
| GK | Joshua Waka | 24 July 2004 (age 22) | 0 | 0 | (Malawi) Ekhaya | v. Botswana, 31 March 2026 |
| GK | Dalitso Khungwa | 7 August 1999 (age 27) | 0 | 0 | (Malawi) Mighty Wanderers | Mukuru 4 Nations Tournament ^{PRE} |
| DF | McDonald Lameck | 10 October 1998 (age 28) | 19 | 0 | (Malawi) Silver Strikers | v. Botswana, 31 March 2026 |
| DF | Maxwell Paipi | 20 November 2001 (age 24) | 9 | 0 | (Zimbabwe) Platinum | v. Botswana, 31 March 2026 |
| DF | Nickson Nyasulu | 3 March 1998 (age 28) | 8 | 0 | (Zimbabwe) Platinum | v. Botswana, 31 March 2026 |
| DF | Emmanuel Nyirenda | 31 January 2000 (age 26) | 5 | 0 | (Malawi) Mighty Wanderers | Mukuru 4 Nations Tournament ^{PRE} |
| DF | Alex Kambilinya | 14 May 2002 (age 24) | 0 | 0 | (Malawi) Mighty Tigers | Mukuru 4 Nations Tournament ^{PRE} |
| DF | Hermas Masinja | 19 February 2006 (age 20) | 0 | 0 | (Malawi) Ekhaya | Mukuru 4 Nations Tournament ^{PRE} |
| DF | Charles Mafaiti | | 0 | 0 | (Malawi) Ekhaya | Mukuru 4 Nations Tournament ^{PRE} |
| DF | Fanizo Mwansambo | 30 December 2000 (age 25) | 0 | 0 | (Malawi) Ekhaya | Mukuru 4 Nations Tournament ^{PRE} |
| DF | Dan Sandukira | 10 August 2001 (age 25) | 0 | 0 | (Malawi) Silver Strikers | Mukuru 4 Nations Tournament ^{PRE} |
| DF | Alick Lungu | 24 March 2002 (age 24) | 22 | 0 | (Malawi) Ekhaya | v. Lesotho; 18 November 2025 |
| DF | Jubril Okedina | 26 October 2000 (age 26) | 2 | 0 | (Republic of Ireland) Bohemian | v. Lesotho; 18 November 2025 |
| MF | Lloyd Aaron | 8 January 2003 (age 23) | 28 | 1 | (Libya) Al Sadaqa | v. Botswana, 31 March 2026 |
| MF | Robert Saizi | 5 July 2003 (age 23) | 17 | 1 | (Zambia) Zanaco | v. Botswana, 31 March 2026 |
| MF | Chawanangwa Gumbo | 25 March 2002 (age 24) | 8 | 0 | (Malawi) Nyasa Big Bullets | v. Botswana, 31 March 2026 |
| MF | Charles Nkhoma | 28 July 1998 (age 28) | 1 | 0 | (Malawi) MMoyale Barracks | Mukuru 4 Nations Tournament ^{PRE} |
| MF | Uchizi Vunga | 29 December 2000 (age 25) | 0 | 0 | (Malawi) Silver Strikers | Mukuru 4 Nations Tournament ^{PRE} |
| MF | Moses Banda | | 0 | 0 | (Malawi) Ekhaya | Mukuru 4 Nations Tournament ^{PRE} |
| FW | Chawanangwa Kawonga | 5 January 1995 (age 31) | 36 | 5 | (Zimbabwe) CAPS United | v. Botswana, 31 March 2026 |
| FW | Chikumbutso Salima | 27 December 2003 (age 22) | 9 | 0 | (Sudan) Al Merrikh | v. Botswana, 31 March 2026 |
| FW | Andrew Joseph | 1 August 2002 (age 24) | 0 | 0 | (Malawi) Silver Strikers | Mukuru 4 Nations Tournament ^{PRE} |
| FW | Allen Chihana | 6 April 2002 (age 24) | 0 | 0 | (Malawi) Ekhaya | Mukuru 4 Nations Tournament ^{PRE} |
| FW | Wallace Adam | | 0 | 0 | (Malawi) Mighty Wanderers | Mukuru 4 Nations Tournament ^{PRE} |
| FW | Gabadinho Mhango | 27 September 1992 (age 34) | 74 | 20 | (South Africa) Richards Bay | v. Lesotho; 18 November 2025 |
| FW | Lanjesi Nkhoma | 27 May 2002 (age 24) | 23 | 4 | (Democratic Republic of the Congo) TP Mazembe | v. Lesotho; 18 November 2025 |
| FW | Yann Kouakou | 17 August 1999 (age 27) | 0 | 0 | (North Macedonia) AP Brera | v. Lesotho; 18 November 2025 |

== Records ==
As of 8 September 2025
Players in bold are still active with Malawi.

=== Most appearances ===
| Rank | Player | Caps | Goals | Career |
|---|---|---|---|---|
| 1 | Young Chimodzi | 159 | 13 | 1979–1995 |
| 2 | Jack Chamangwana | 133 | 10 | 1975–1985 |
| 3 | Lawrence Waya | 129 | 28 | 1982–1996 |
| 4 | Harry Waya | 126 | 8 | 1977–1987 |
| 5 | Kinnah Phiri | 117 | 71 | 1973–1981 |
| 6 | Gilbert Chirwa | 112 | 4 | 1981–1993 |
| 7 | Jonathan Billie | 110 | 8 | 1978–1987 |
| 8 | Joseph Kamwendo | 104 | 6 | 2003–2017 |
| 9 | Felix Nyirongo | 103 | 2 | 1986–1997 |
| 10 | Peter Mponda | 102 | 1 | 1998–2011 |

=== Top goalscorers ===
| Rank | Player | Goals | Caps | Ratio | Career |
|---|---|---|---|---|---|
| 1 | Kinnah Phiri | 71 | 117 | 0.61 | 1973–1981 |
| 2 | Frank Sinalo | 28 | 75 | 0.37 | 1981–1989 |
| 2 | Lawrence Waya | 28 | 129 | 0.22 | 1982–1996 |
| 4 | Stock Dandize | 23 | 70 | 0.33 | 1977–1983 |
| 5 | Yasin Osman | 22 | 67 | 0.33 | 1966–1975 |
| 5 | Essau Kanyenda | 22 | 72 | 0.31 | 1999–2015 |
| 5 | Chiukepo Msowoya | 22 | 89 | 0.25 | 2006–2023 |
| 8 | **Gabadinho Mhango** | 20 | 75 | 0.27 | 2012–present |
| 9 | Peterkins Kayira | 18 | 68 | 0.26 | 1983–1989 |
| 10 | Barnet Gondwe | 17 | 66 | 0.26 | 1976–1981 |

== Competition records ==
=== FIFA World Cup ===
| FIFA World Cup record | | | | | | | | | | Qualification record | | | | | |
| Year | Round | Position | Pld | W | D | L | GF | GA | Squad | Pld | W | D | L | GF | GA |
|---|---|---|---|---|---|---|---|---|---|---|---|---|---|---|---|
| (England) 1966 | Not a FIFA member | | | | | | | | | Not a FIFA member | | | | | |
| (Mexico) 1970 | Did not enter | | | | | | | | | Did not enter | | | | | |
| (West Germany) 1974 | Did not enter | | | | | | | | | Did not enter | | | | | |
| (Argentina) 1978 | Did not qualify | | | | | | | | | 2 | 0 | 0 | 2 | 0 | 5 |
| (Spain) 1982 | Did not qualify | | | | | | | | | 2 | 0 | 1 | 1 | 1 | 4 |
| (Mexico) 1986 | Did not qualify | | | | | | | | | 4 | 2 | 1 | 1 | 5 | 2 |
| (Italy) 1990 | Did not qualify | | | | | | | | | 8 | 2 | 3 | 3 | 6 | 6 |
| (United States) 1994 | Withdrew | | | | | | | | | Withdrew | | | | | |
| (France) 1998 | Did not qualify | | | | | | | | | 2 | 0 | 0 | 2 | 0 | 4 |
| (South Korea) (Japan) 2002 | Did not qualify | | | | | | | | | 8 | 1 | 2 | 5 | 6 | 12 |
| (Germany) 2006 | Did not qualify | | | | | | | | | 12 | 2 | 4 | 6 | 15 | 27 |
| (South Africa) 2010 | Did not qualify | | | | | | | | | 12 | 5 | 1 | 6 | 18 | 16 |
| (Brazil) 2014 | Did not qualify | | | | | | | | | 6 | 1 | 4 | 1 | 4 | 5 |
| (Russia) 2018 | Did not qualify | | | | | | | | | 2 | 1 | 0 | 1 | 1 | 2 |
| (Qatar) 2022 | Did not qualify | | | | | | | | | 8 | 2 | 1 | 5 | 3 | 12 |
| (Canada) (Mexico) (United States) 2026 | Did not qualify | | | | | | | | | 10 | 4 | 1 | 5 | 11 | 10 |
| (Morocco) (Portugal) (Spain) 2030 | To be determined | | | | | | | | | To be determined | | | | | |
| (Saudi Arabia) 2034 | To be determined | | | | | | | | | To be determined | | | | | |
| Total | | 0/14 | | | | | | | | 76 | 20 | 18 | 38 | 70 | 105 |

=== Africa Cup of Nations ===
| Africa Cup of Nations record | | | | | | | | | | Qualification record | | | | | |
| Year | Round | Position | Pld | W | D* | L | GF | GA | Squad | Pld | W | D | L | GF | GA |
|---|---|---|---|---|---|---|---|---|---|---|---|---|---|---|---|
| (Tunisia) 1965 | Not affiliated to CAF | | | | | | | | | Not affiliated to CAF | | | | | |
| (Ethiopia) 1968 | Not affiliated to CAF | | | | | | | | | Not affiliated to CAF | | | | | |
| (Sudan) 1970 | Not affiliated to CAF | | | | | | | | | Not affiliated to CAF | | | | | |
| (Cameroon) 1972 | Not affiliated to CAF | | | | | | | | | Not affiliated to CAF | | | | | |
| (Egypt) 1974 | Did not enter | | | | | | | | | Did not enter | | | | | |
| (Ethiopia) 1976 | Did not qualify | | | | | | | | | 2 | 0 | 1 | 1 | 4 | 9 |
| (Ghana) 1978 | Did not qualify | | | | | | | | | 2 | 0 | 1 | 1 | 3 | 4 |
| (Nigeria) 1980 | Did not qualify | | | | | | | | | 4 | 1 | 0 | 3 | 6 | 7 |
| (Libya) 1982 | Did not qualify | | | | | | | | | 2 | 0 | 1 | 1 | 1 | 2 |
| (Ivory Coast) 1984 | Group stage | 7th | 3 | 0 | 1 | 2 | 2 | 6 | Squad | 4 | 3 | 1 | 0 | 6 | 2 |
| (Egypt) 1986 | Did not qualify | | | | | | | | | 2 | 0 | 2 | 0 | 2 | 2 |
| (Morocco) 1988 | Did not qualify | | | | | | | | | 2 | 0 | 0 | 2 | 1 | 4 |
| (Algeria) 1990 | Did not qualify | | | | | | | | | 4 | 1 | 2 | 1 | 5 | 4 |
| (Senegal) 1992 | Did not qualify | | | | | | | | | 4 | 0 | 1 | 3 | 3 | 9 |
| (Tunisia) 1994 | Did not qualify | | | | | | | | | 6 | 2 | 1 | 3 | 4 | 7 |
| (South Africa) 1996 | Did not qualify | | | | | | | | | 6 | 1 | 3 | 2 | 6 | 7 |
| (Burkina Faso) 1998 | Did not qualify | | | | | | | | | 6 | 3 | 0 | 3 | 9 | 10 |
| (Ghana) (Nigeria) 2000 | Did not qualify | | | | | | | | | 2 | 1 | 0 | 1 | 2 | 2 |
| (Mali) 2002 | Did not qualify | | | | | | | | | 2 | 0 | 0 | 2 | 2 | 5 |
| (Tunisia) 2004 | Did not qualify | | | | | | | | | 4 | 1 | 0 | 3 | 3 | 10 |
| (Egypt) 2006 | Did not qualify | | | | | | | | | 12 | 2 | 4 | 6 | 15 | 27 |
| (Ghana) 2008 | Did not qualify | | | | | | | | | 4 | 1 | 0 | 3 | 2 | 6 |
| (Angola) 2010 | Group stage | 11th | 3 | 1 | 0 | 2 | 4 | 5 | Squad | 6 | 4 | 0 | 2 | 14 | 5 |
| (Equatorial Guinea) (Gabon) 2012 | Did not qualify | | | | | | | | | 8 | 2 | 6 | 0 | 13 | 8 |
| (South Africa) 2013 | Did not qualify | | | | | | | | | 4 | 1 | 0 | 3 | 4 | 6 |
| (Equatorial Guinea) 2015 | Did not qualify | | | | | | | | | 6 | 2 | 1 | 3 | 5 | 9 |
| (Gabon) 2017 | Did not qualify | | | | | | | | | 6 | 2 | 1 | 3 | 5 | 9 |
| (Egypt) 2019 | Did not qualify | | | | | | | | | 6 | 1 | 2 | 3 | 2 | 6 |
| (Cameroon) 2021 | Round of 16 | 13th | 4 | 1 | 1 | 2 | 3 | 4 | Squad | 6 | 3 | 1 | 2 | 4 | 5 |
| (Ivory Coast) 2023 | Did not qualify | | | | | | | | | 6 | 1 | 2 | 3 | 4 | 10 |
| (Morocco) 2025 | Did not qualify | | | | | | | | | 6 | 1 | 1 | 4 | 6 | 11 |
| (Kenya) (Tanzania) (Uganda) 2027 | To be determined | | | | | | | | | To be determined | | | | | |
| 2029 | To be determined | | | | | | | | | To be determined | | | | | |
| Total | Round of 16 | 3/35 | 10 | 2 | 2 | 6 | 9 | 15 | | 122 | 33 | 31 | 58 | 131 | 186 |

=== African Games ===
| Year | Result | Pld | W | D | L | GF | GA |
|---|---|---|---|---|---|---|---|
| (Republic of the Congo) 1965 | Did not qualify | | | | | | |
| (Nigeria) 1973 | Did not qualify | | | | | | |
| (Algeria) 1978 | 4th | 5 | 0 | 0 | 5 | 2 | 11 |
| (Kenya) 1987 | 3rd | 5 | 3 | 1 | 1 | 8 | 4 |
| Total | 2/4 | 10 | 3 | 1 | 6 | 10 | 15 |

== Head-to-head record ==
As of 25 September 2026 after match against South Sudan

More wins than losses As many wins as losses Fewer wins than losses

| Opponent | Pld | W | D | L | GF | GA | GD |
|---|---|---|---|---|---|---|---|
| Algeria | 7 | 2 | 1 | 4 | 6 | 13 | −7 |
| Angola | 10 | 3 | 3 | 4 | 8 | 11 | −3 |
| Bangladesh | 1 | 0 | 1 | 0 | 1 | 1 | 0 |
| Benin | 2 | 1 | 0 | 1 | 1 | 1 | 0 |
| Botswana | 27 | 12 | 9 | 6 | 48 | 23 | +25 |
| Burkina Faso | 8 | 1 | 2 | 5 | 8 | 13 | −5 |
| Burundi | 5 | 0 | 3 | 2 | 6 | 9 | −3 |
| Cameroon | 11 | 1 | 4 | 6 | 6 | 19 | −13 |
| Chad | 6 | 3 | 1 | 2 | 15 | 10 | +5 |
| Comoros | 5 | 4 | 0 | 1 | 7 | 3 | +4 |
| Congo | 2 | 0 | 0 | 2 | 1 | 3 | −2 |
| Djibouti | 4 | 4 | 0 | 0 | 17 | 1 | +16 |
| DR Congo | 10 | 3 | 3 | 4 | 8 | 9 | −1 |
| Egypt | 12 | 3 | 2 | 7 | 8 | 20 | −12 |
| Eritrea | 1 | 1 | 0 | 0 | 3 | 2 | +1 |
| Eswatini | 28 | 11 | 12 | 5 | 41 | 22 | +19 |
| Ethiopia | 16 | 4 | 8 | 4 | 14 | 16 | –2 |
| Equatorial Guinea | 1 | 0 | 0 | 1 | 0 | 1 | –1 |
| Gabon | 1 | 1 | 0 | 0 | 2 | 0 | +2 |
| Ghana | 6 | 0 | 1 | 5 | 0 | 17 | −17 |
| Guinea | 10 | 1 | 4 | 5 | 9 | 14 | −5 |
| Ivory Coast | 8 | 1 | 1 | 6 | 8 | 17 | −9 |
| Kenya | 48 | 19 | 18 | 11 | 61 | 50 | +11 |
| Lesotho | 26 | 14 | 7 | 5 | 47 | 17 | +30 |
| Liberia | 5 | 1 | 2 | 2 | 3 | 4 | −1 |
| Libya | 3 | 0 | 1 | 2 | 3 | 5 | −2 |
| Madagascar | 10 | 2 | 1 | 7 | 12 | 21 | −9 |
| Mali | 5 | 1 | 1 | 3 | 5 | 8 | −3 |
| Mauritius | 21 | 12 | 5 | 4 | 33 | 19 | +14 |
| Morocco | 11 | 1 | 3 | 7 | 4 | 17 | −13 |
| Mozambique | 37 | 13 | 14 | 10 | 37 | 34 | +3 |
| Namibia | 19 | 5 | 5 | 9 | 18 | 23 | −5 |
| Nigeria | 8 | 0 | 2 | 6 | 9 | 20 | −11 |
| Réunion | 1 | 1 | 0 | 0 | 8 | 2 | +6 |
| Rwanda | 9 | 5 | 2 | 2 | 16 | 9 | +7 |
| São Tomé and Príncipe | 2 | 1 | 0 | 1 | 3 | 2 | +1 |
| Senegal | 7 | 1 | 1 | 5 | 6 | 14 | −8 |
| Seychelles | 2 | 2 | 0 | 0 | 5 | 0 | +5 |
| Sierra Leone | 4 | 3 | 1 | 0 | 14 | 5 | +9 |
| Somalia | 3 | 3 | 0 | 0 | 6 | 2 | +4 |
| South Africa | 14 | 1 | 4 | 9 | 5 | 20 | −15 |
| South Sudan | 4 | 3 | 0 | 1 | 4 | 3 | +1 |
| Sudan | 3 | 2 | 1 | 0 | 6 | 1 | +5 |
| Tanzania | 56 | 17 | 25 | 14 | 62 | 54 | +8 |
| Togo | 3 | 2 | 1 | 0 | 3 | 1 | +2 |
| Tunisia | 9 | 2 | 3 | 4 | 8 | 19 | −11 |
| Uganda | 32 | 9 | 9 | 14 | 33 | 39 | −6 |
| Yemen | 1 | 0 | 0 | 1 | 0 | 1 | −1 |
| Zambia | 82 | 20 | 17 | 45 | 70 | 173 | −103 |
| Zambia U23 | 1 | 0 | 1 | 0 | 0 | 0 | 0 |
| Zanzibar | 15 | 12 | 2 | 1 | 34 | 10 | +24 |
| Zimbabwe | 67 | 19 | 23 | 25 | 64 | 85 | −21 |
| Total | 689 | 227 | 204 | 258 | 796 | 883 | −87 |

== Honours ==
=== Continental ===
- African Games^{1}
  - (bronze) Bronze medal (1): 1987

=== Regional ===
- CECAFA Cup
  - (gold) Champions (3): 1978, 1979, 1988
  - (silver) Runners-up (3): 1975, 1984, 1989
  - (bronze) Third place (3): 1977, 1980, 1985
- COSAFA Cup
  - (silver) Runners-up (2): 2002, 2003

Notes

1. Competition organized by ANOCA, officially not recognized by FIFA.
