= Kinnah Phiri =

Malawian football player and manager

Personal information
- Date of birth: 30 October 1954 (age 72)
- Place of birth: Blantyre, Malawi
- Position: Striker

Senior career*
Years	Team	Apps	(Gls)
1973–1981	Big Bullets		
1982–1984	Manzini Wanderers		

International career
1973–1981	Malawi	117	(71)

Managerial career
- 2004–2005: Big Bullets
- 2006–2007: Malawi (caretaker)
- 2007–2008: Free State Stars
- 2008–2013: Malawi
- 2014: Free State Stars
- 2014–2015: Free State Stars
- 2017: Mochudi Centre Chiefs
- 2017–2020: Jwaneng Galaxy
- * Club domestic league appearances and goals

Kinnah Phiri (born 30 October 1954) is a Malawian football coach and former player who most recently coached Jwaneng Galaxy. He is the Deputy Director of Sports in the Ministry of Youth and Sports.

He is the all-time top goalscorer for the Malawi national team, having scored 71 goals in 117 games. He also managed the side twice, first as caretaker from 2006 to 2007 and then again from 2008 until he was sacked in 2013 following Malawi's failure to qualify for the 2013 Africa Cup of Nations.

== Playing career ==
Born in Blantyre, Kinnah began playing football for local side Big Bullets, and in 1982 was offered a contract by UAE club Sharjah SC. He was not allowed to leave the country, but he moved to Swaziland to play for Manzini Wanderers where he would finish his playing career.

Phiri was the inspiration behind the Malawi national team's finest hours in the late 1970s when Malawi twice won the East and Central Africa Challenge Cup. He scored 71 goals in 115 games.

In his club career, he stated that he had scored over 700 goals.

== Coaching career ==
- Bakili Bullets, Malawi (head coach)
- Free State Stars, South African Premier Soccer League (head coach)
- Malawi U23 (head coach)
- Malawi (head coach)

== Career statistics ==
Scores and results list Malawi's goal tally first, score column indicates score after each Phiri goal.

== See also ==
- List of top international men's football goalscorers by country
- List of men's footballers with 100 or more international caps
- List of men's footballers with 50 or more international goals
