= Malambo West =

National Assembly constituency in Zambia

Malambo West is a constituency of the National Assembly of Zambia. It was created in 2026. It covers the western part of Mambwe District, including the town of Mfuwe.

== List of MPs ==
Election year	MP	Party
2026	Patrick Mwale	National Reconciliation Party for Unity and Prosperity
