= Harry Waya =

Malawian former footballer

Personal information
- Place of birth: Malawi
- Position: Defender

Senior career*
Years	Team	Apps	(Gls)
1975-1987	Bata Bullets		

International career
1977–1987	Malawi	126	(8)
- * Club domestic league appearances and goals

Harry Waya is a Malawian former footballer who played as a defender for Bata Bullets and the Malawi national team. He made 126 appearances and scored 8 goals for Malawi.
