= Deaths in April 1993 =

The following is a list of notable deaths in April 1993.

Entries for each day are listed alphabetically by surname. A typical entry lists information in the following sequence:

- Name, age, country of citizenship at birth, subsequent country of citizenship (if applicable), reason for notability, cause of death (if known), and reference.

== April 1993 ==
=== 1 ===
- Infante Juan, Count of Barcelona, 79, Spanish royal, laryngeal cancer.
- Kristian Bjørn, 73, Norwegian cross-country skier and Olympian (1948).
- Andrée Brunin, 56, French author.
- Howard Scott Gentry, 89, American botanist.
- Kevin Gilbert, 59, Aboriginal Australian writer, activist, and visual artist.
- Jerry Hausner, 83, American radio and television actor.
- Alan Kulwicki, 38, American racing driver, plane crash.
- Fred Schwengel, 86, American politician, member of the United States House of Representatives (1955-1965, 1967-1973).
- Czesław Suszczyk, 71, Polish football player and Olympian (1952).
- Nicanor Zabaleta Zala, 86, Spanish harpist.
- Solly Zuckerman, Baron Zuckerman, 88, British public servant and zoologist, thrombosis.

=== 2 ===
- Edward Edinborough Chamberlain, 86, New Zealand plant pathologist.
- Hugh Fernando, 76, Sri Lankan politician.
- Thales Monteiro, 68, Brazilian basketball player and Olympian (1952).
- Masaichi Niimi, 106, Japanese naval admiral during World War II.
- Alexander Bell Patterson, 81, Canadian politician, MP (1953–1958, 1962–1968, 1972–1984).
- Asoka Ponnamperuma, 56, Sri Lankan actor, singer, and scriptwriter.
- Donald W. Reynolds, 86, American businessman and philanthropist.
- Sarban, 62, Afghan singer.
- Frank Sharp, 87, American land developer and stock fraudster.
- Ernst von Bodelschwingh, 86, German politician and member of the Bundestag.

=== 3 ===
- Red Allen, 63, American bluegrass singer and guitarist.
- Lydia Auster, 80, Estonian composer.
- Eduardo Caballero Calderón, 83, Colombian writer.
- Eugene Church, 55, American R&B singer and songwriter, cancer.
- Sali Herman, 95, Swiss-Australian artist.
- Pinky Lee, 85, American comedian and children's entertainer.
- Eugenie Leontovich, 93-100, Russian-American actress (The Rains of Ranchipur, Homicidal, Naked City), cardiac arrest and pneumonia.
- Alexandre Mnouchkine, 85, Russian-French film producer.
- Peter J. De Muth, 101, American politician, member of the United States House of Representatives (1937-1939).
- Leopoldo Nachbin, 71, Brazilian mathematician.
- Götz Dieter Plage, 56, German cinematographer, airship crash.
- Lazkao Txiki, 66, Basque bertsolari poet and musician.
- Bonifacio Zarcal, 73, Filipino Olympic boxer (1948).

=== 4 ===
- Alfred Mosher Butts, 93, American architect, inventor of Scrabble.
- Edera Cordiale, 73, Italian Olympic discus thrower (1948, 1952).
- Pierre de Cossé, 12th Duke of Brissac, 93, French memoirist.
- Charles Elworthy, Baron Elworthy, 82, British Royal Air Force marshal.
- Terje Rollem, 77, Norwegian resistance officer during World War II.
- Zdzisław Smoliński, 50, Polish Olympic hammer thrower (1964).
- Albert Fahmy Tadros, 78, Egyptian basketball player and Olympian (1936, 1948, 1952).

=== 5 ===
- Harbans Bhalla, 62, Indian poet.
- Divya Bharti, 19, Indian actress (Deewana, Shola Aur Shabnam, Vishwatma), fall.
- Joe Coscarart, 83, American baseball player (Boston Braves/Bees).
- Vernon McCain, 84, American football and basketball coach.

=== 6 ===
- Selma Andersson, 98, Swedish Olympic diver (1912, 1920).
- George Arceneaux, 64, American district judge (United States District Court for the Eastern District of Louisiana).
- Viktor Avbelj, 79, Slovenian politician.
- Charles Burkill, 93, English mathematician.
- Peter DeFeo, 91, American mobster belonging to the Genovese crime family.
- Miguel Ángel Gómez, 24, Spanish sprinter and Olympian (1992).
- Cecil B. Lyon, 89, American diplomat.
- Clarence McGeary, 66, American football player (Green Bay Packers).
- Frans Slaats, 80, Dutch cyclist.
- Inge von Wangenheim, 80, German actress and author.
- Chen Zaidao, 84, Chinese general.

=== 7 ===
- Edward Adamczyk, 71, Polish Olympic athlete (1948).
- Tonny Ahm, 78, Danish badminton champion.
- Bob Alexander, 70, Canadian baseball player (Baltimore Orioles, Cleveland Indians).
- Gerardo Chiaromonte, 68, Italian communist politician, journalist, and writer.
- Max Croiset, 80, Dutch actor (The Village on the River).
- Billy Griffith, 78, English cricketer.
- Heinz Hoppe, 69, German lyric tenor in opera, lied and operetta.
- Leo Lafrance, 90, Canadian ice hockey player (Montreal Canadiens, Chicago Black Hawks).
- Gladys Lehman, 101, American screenwriter, pneumonia.
- Howie McFarland, 83, American baseball player (Washington Senators).
- Vincent Perera, 74, Sri Lankan statesman.
- Terry Price, 47, Welsh rugby player, traffic collision.
- Hugh E. Rodham, 82, American businessman and father of politician Hillary Clinton, stroke.
- Arleen Whelan, 76, American actress (The Doughgirls), stroke.

=== 8 ===
- Marian Anderson, 96, American singer, congestive heart failure.
- Stole Aranđelović, 62, Serbian actor.
- Álida España, 68, Guatemalan activist and politician.
- Billy Gayles, 61, American drummer and singer, cancer.
- Bobby Mitchell, 68, Scottish football player.
- Aleksei Saltykov, 58, Soviet and Russian film director and screenwriter.
- Dave Shannon, 70, Australian bomber pilot during World War II.
- Konrad Srzednicki, 98, Polish painter.

=== 9 ===
- Morteza Avini, 45, Iranian documentary filmmaker and author, landmine explosion.
- Robert B. Claytor, 71, American railroad administrator, cancer.
- Les Cunningham, 79, Canadian ice hockey player (New York Americans, Chicago Black Hawks).
- Lindalva Justo de Oliveira, 39, Brazilian Roman Catholic nun, stabbed.
- Joseph B. Soloveitchik, 90, American Orthodox rabbi and philosopher.
- Adolf Vogl, 82, Austrian footballer.
- Jess Yates, 74, English television presenter (Stars on Sunday), stroke.

=== 10 ===
- Donald Broadbent, 66, English psychologist.
- Chris Hani, 50, South African politician, assassinated.
- Maxim Lieber, 95, American literary agent.
- Leo Metzenbauer, 83, Austrian art director.

=== 11 ===
- Fides Benini, 63, Italian Olympic swimmer (1952).
- Wacław Dworzecki, 82, Soviet film and theater actor.
- George Albert Hammes, 81, American Roman Catholic prelate, Bishop of Superior (1960–1985).
- Rahmon Nabiyev, 62, Tajik politician, president (1991, 1991–1992), infarction.
- C. William Johnson, 76, American Olympic skeleton racer (1948).
- Pietro Sessa, 65, Italian Olympic rower (1948).
- Malcolm Wiseman, 79, Canadian Olympic basketball player (1936).

=== 12 ===
- Hussein Kulmiye Afrah, 73, Somalian politician and Vice President.
- Liz Andrew, 45, Australian politician, MLA (1974–1977), cancer.
- Scotty Cameron, 71, Canadian ice hockey player (New York Rangers).
- Troy Dandridge, 88, American baseball player.
- Rafael Aguilar Guajardo, 43, Mexican drug lord, shot.
- George Frederick Ives, 111, Canadian supercentenarian.
- Andrew Johnston, 77, Scottish cricketer.
- Emil Synek, 89, Czech playwright, novelist, biographer, and film director

=== 13 ===
- Grigori Abrikosov, 60, Soviet theatre and film actor.
- Andronik Iosifyan, 87, Soviet aerospace engineers.
- Isaac Francisco del Ángel Rojas, 86, Argentine naval admiral and politician, vice president (1955–1958).
- Henning Schwarz, 64, German politician, leukemia.
- Prince Scott, 75, American football player.
- Wallace Stegner, 84, American novelist (Angle of Repose, The Spectator Bird, The Big Rock Candy Mountain), traffic collision.
- Ernesto Montagne Sánchez, 76, Peruvian politician.
- Rudolf Wetzer, 92, Romanian football player, manager, and Olympian (1924).

=== 14 ===
- Enrique Estébanez, 80, Spanish Olympic field hockey player (1948).
- John Golland, 50, English composer.
- Reuben Hecht, 83, Israeli industrialist.
- Walther Kohlhase, 85, German painter.
- Jim McDonnell, 70, American baseball player.
- Negussie Roba, 56, Ethiopian sprinter and Olympian (1956, 1960).
- Geza Szabo, 52, Romanian Olympic ice hockey player (1964, 1968).

=== 15 ===
- Harry Alexander, 87, Australian cricketer.
- William Bakewell, 84, American actor (All Quiet on the Western Front, Dance, Fools, Dance, Gold Diggers of Broadway), leukemia.
- Uwe Beyer, 48, German Olympic hammer thrower (1964, 1968, 1972).
- Leslie Charteris, 85, English author (The Saint).
- Bertie Crellin, 90, Australian rules footballer.
- Lucette Descaves, 87, French pianist and teacher.
- Alberto Giolitti, 69, Italian-American comic book artist.
- Georges Guillez, 83, French Olympic sprinter (1936).
- John Hunter, 84, Canadian politician, member of the House of Commons of Canada (1949-1957).
- Peter Pietras, 84, American soccer player and Olympian (1936).
- Herbert Dudley Purves, 84, New Zealand chemist, mathematician, and scientist.
- Eduard Rhein, 92, German writer.
- Robert Westall, 63, English author and teacher.
- John Tuzo Wilson, 84, Canadian geophysicist.
- Rafael Ávalos, 66, Mexican football player.

=== 16 ===
- Mac Cara, 78, American football player (Pittsburgh Pirates).
- Josef Greindl, 80, German opera singer.
- Ruby Hammond, 57, Australian indigenous rights campaigner.
- Sharon Herbaugh, 39, American journalist and war correspondent, helicopter crash.
- Aleksandr Kondratov, 55, Russian linguist, biologist, journalist and poet.
- Sutan Mohammad Amin Nasution, 89, Indonesian writer and politician.
- Geoff Organ, 74, Australian rules footballer.
- Malik Ram, 86, Indian poet and scholar.

=== 17 ===
- Joachim Karliczek, 78, Polish Olympic swimmer (1936).
- Nikolai Kryukov, 77, Soviet film and theater actor.
- Mario Maccaferri, 92, Italian luthier, classical guitarist, and inventor.
- Shahen Meghrian, 41, Armenian military commander and political activist, killed in action.
- Turgut Özal, 65, Turkish politician, president (since 1989), prime minister (1983–1989), heart attack.

=== 18 ===
- Isgender Aznaurov, 36, Azerbaijani military officer, killed in action.
- Elisabeth Frink, 62, English sculptor, cancer.
- Masahiko Kimura, 75, Japanese judoka, lung cancer.
- Reynold Higgins, 76, British lassical Archaeologist.
- Walter Lohmann, 81, German cyclist.
- Werner Pochath, 53, Austrian film actor, AIDS-related complications.
- Bernie Wayne, 74, American composer, heart failure.

=== 19 ===
- Steve Douglas, 54, American saxophonist (The Beach Boys, Bob Dylan, Dion DiMucci), heart failure.
- Blas Galindo, 83, Mexican composer (Sones de Mariachi).
- Tom Jamieson, 69, Canadian ice hockey player.
- David Koresh, 33, American cult leader (Branch Davidians), gunshot wound.
- Rabe Ferguson Marsh Jr., 87, American district judge (United States District Court for the Western District of Pennsylvania).
- George S. Mickelson, 52, American politician, governor of South Dakota (since 1987), plane crash.
- Barbara Stoler Miller, 52, American Indologist, cancer.
- Clifford Scott, 64, American saxophonist and flautist.
- Joseph A. Sellinger, 72, American Catholic priest and Jesuit, pancreatic cancer.

=== 20 ===
- Leonas Baltrūnas, 78, Lithuanian basketball player and coach.
- Antonio Bello, 58, Italian Catholic prelate, stomach cancer.
- Luiz Borracha, 72, Brazilian footballer.
- Cantinflas, 81, Mexican actor (Around the World in 80 Days, El bolero de Raquel, Pepe), lung cancer.
- Evelyne Hall, 83, American hurdler and Olympic medalist (1932).
- Frank Stubbs, 83, American Olympic ice hockey player (1936).
- Khairallah Talfah, 82, Iraqi Ba'ath Party official and father-in-law of Saddam Hussein.

=== 21 ===
- Galeazzo Benti, 69, Italian actor, heart attack.
- Paul G. Gassman, 57, American chemist, aortic dissection.
- Robert Dale Henderson, 48, American serial killer, execution by electrocution.
- Rowland Hilder, 88, English painter and book illustrator.
- William Curry Holden, 96, American historian and archaeologist.
- Lincoln Hurring, 61, New Zealand swimmer and Olympian (1952, 1956), heart attack.
- Niels Rohweder, 87, Danish architect.
- Hal Schumacher, 82, American baseball player (New York Giants), stomach cancer.
- Raymond Smillie, 89, Canadian Olympic boxer (1928).

=== 22 ===
- Bertus Aafjes, 78, Dutch poet.
- Luis Beltrán Prieto Figueroa, 91, Venezuelan politician, president of the Senate (1962–1967).
- Mark Koenig, 88, American baseball player (New York Yankees, Chicago Cubs, New York Giants), cancer.
- Pasang Lhamu Sherpa, 31, Nepalese mountain climber, climbing accident.
- Andries Treurnicht, 72, South African politician, complications during heart surgery.

=== 23 ===
- Bertus Aafjes, 78, Dutch poet, cancer.
- Lalith Athulathmudali, 56, Sri Lankan politician, MP (1977–1991), assassinated.
- Robert Bürchler, 77, Swiss sport shooter and Olympic medalist (1952).
- Guido Carli, 79, Italian banker, economist and politician.
- Cesar Chavez, 66, American labor leader and civil rights activist.
- Chaim Mordechai Aizik Hodakov, 91, Russian-American Chabad leader.
- Fernando Hurtado, 65, Chilean footballer.
- Daniel Jones, 80, Welsh composer.
- Séra Martin, 86, French middle-distance runner and Olympian (1928, 1932).
- John Nevius, 72, American lawyer and politician, member (1967-1969) and chairman (1972-1974) of the Council of the District of Columbia.
- Janina Skirlińska, 86, Polish Olympic gymnast (1936).
- DJ Subroc, 19, American hip-hop artist, traffic accident.

=== 24 ===
- Gustl Bayrhammer, 71, German actor, heart attack.
- Richard Donchian, 87, American commodities and futures trader.
- Everett F. Drumright, 86, American diplomat.
- Ian Jacob, 93, British Army officer.
- Ethel Magafan, 76, American painter.
- Jim McDonnell, 70, American baseball player (Cleveland Indians).
- Pierre Naville, 89, French surrealist writer and sociologist.
- Oliver Reginald Tambo, 75, South African politician, complications from a stroke.
- Tran Duc Thao, 75, Vietnamese philosopher.

=== 25 ===
- Geraldo Del Rey, 62, Brazilian actor, lung cancer.
- Hüseyin Erçetin, 81, Turkish Olympic wrestler (1936).
- Georges Favre, 87, French composer.
- Ferenc Klics, 69, Hungarian athlete and Olympian (1948, 1952, 1956, 1960).
- S. M. Koya, 70, Fijian politician and statesman.
- Rosita Moreno, 86, Spanish actress (Walls of Gold, Ladies Should Listen, The Scoundrel).
- Henri René, 86, American musician.

=== 26 ===
- Vivek Agarwal, 31, Indian cricketer and flight attendant, plane crash.
- Bob Broadbent, 68, English cricketer (Worcestershire).
- Floyd Chalmers, 94, Canadian editor, publisher and philanthropist.
- Desmond Crawley, 75, British diplomat.
- Darussalam, 72, Indonesian actor.
- Roger Miller, 38, American baseball player (Milwaukee Brewers), acetylene tank explosion.

=== 27 ===
- France Bezlaj, 82, Slovenian linguist.
- Hans Sahl, 90, German writer.
- Ilie Oană, 74, Romanian football player and manager.
- Victims of the 1993 Zambia national football team plane crash:
  - Patrick Banda, 19, Zambian footballer.
  - David Chabala, 33, Zambian footballer and Olympian (1988).
  - Whiteson Changwe, 28, Zambian footballer.
  - Wisdom Mumba Chansa, 29, Zambian footballer and Olympian (1988).
  - Moses Chikwalakwala, 23, Zambian footballer.
  - Godfrey Chitalu, 45, Zambian footballer, coach, and Olympian (1980).
  - Alex Chola, 36, Zambian footballer, coach, and Olympian (1980).
  - Samuel Chomba, 29, Zambian footballer and Olympian (1988).
  - Godfrey Kangwa, Zambian footballer.
  - Derby Makinka, 27, Zambian footballer and Olympian (1988).
  - Moses Masuwa, 21, Zambian footballer.
  - Eston Mulenga, 31, Zambian footballer and Olympian (1988).
  - Winter Mumba, Zambian footballer.
  - Kelvin Mutale, 23, Zambian footballer.
  - Richard Mwanza, 33, Zambian footballer and Olympian (1988).
  - Numba Mwila, 21, Zambian footballer.
  - Timothy Mwitwa, 24, Zambian footballer.
  - Kenan Simambe, 18, Zambian footballer.
  - John Soko, 24, Zambian footballer.
  - Robert Watiyakeni, 23, Zambian footballer.

=== 28 ===
- Jack Bighead, 63, American football player (Baltimore Colts, Los Angeles Rams).
- Enrique de Chávarri, 90, Spanish Olympic athlete (1928).
- Diva Diniz Corrêa, 74, Brazilian marine zoologist.
- Harold Darragh, 90, Canadian ice hockey player.
- Momčilo Gavrić, 86, Serbian soldier, youngest participant of World War I.
- Valentina Grizodubova, 84, Soviet aviator and Hero of the Soviet Union.
- Stefan Hajduk, 59, Polish Olympic wrestler (1960).
- Santiago Pi, 63, Spanish Olympic sailor (1960).
- Chon Sang-pyong, 63, South Korean writer.
- Ben Schwartzwalder, 83, American football player and Hall of Fame coach (Syracuse Orange).
- Jim Valvano, 47, American college basketball player (Rutgers) and coach (NC State, Iona), adenocarcinoma.
- Len Walsh, 80, Australian rules footballer.

=== 29 ===
- Kenneth Caskey, 89, American Olympic hammer thrower (1928).
- Michael Gordon, 83, American film director (Pillow Talk, Cyrano de Bergerac).
- Wilhelm Hanle, 92, German experimental physicist.
- Cy Howard, 77, American screenwriter (The Smothers Brothers Comedy Hour).
- Fernand Prudhomme, 76, French Olympic basketball player (1936).
- Mick Ronson, 46, English guitarist (The Spiders from Mars), liver cancer.
- Robert Bertram Serjeant, 78, British scholar, traveller, and Arabists.
- Leona E. Tyler, 86, American psychologist.

=== 30 ===
- Colin Emerson Bennett, 85, Canadian politician, member of the House of Commons of Canada (1949-1957).
- Tommy Caton, 30, English footballer, heart attack.
- Mario Evaristo, 84, Argentine football player.
- Enrique Inostroza, 80, Chilean long-distance runner and Olympian (1948).
- Waruhiu Itote, 71, Kenyan rebel leader during the Mau Mau rebellion, stroke.
- Kurt Kuhlmey, 79, German general during World War II.
- Árpád Lengyel, 78, Hungarian swimmer and Olympic medalist (1936).
- Eric Rowan, 83, South African cricket player.
- Dave Waymer, 34, American football player (New Orleans Saints, San Francisco 49ers, Los Angeles Raiders), heart attack.
- Daphne Young, 77, English badminton player.
- Frija Zoaretz, 85, Israeli politician.
