= 1992 CECAFA Cup =

Tournament details
- Host country: Tanzania
- Dates: November 15–28
- Teams: 9 (from CECAFA confederations)

Final positions
- Champions: Uganda (6th title)
- Runners-up: Tanzania (B)

Tournament statistics
- Matches played: 20
- Goals scored: 56 (2.8 per match)
- Top scorer: (Zambia) Kelvin Mutale (7 goals)

The 1992 CECAFA Cup was the 19th edition of the tournament. It was held in Tanzania, and was won by Uganda. The matches were played between November 15–28.

Tanzania sent two teams: Tanzania A and Tanzania B, with their B team finishing as runners-up.

== Group stage ==
=== Group A ===
Played in Arusha

Team	Pts	Pld	W	D	L	GF	GA	GD
Uganda	4	3	1	2	0	7	4	+3
Tanzania B	4	3	1	2	0	4	1	+3
Kenya	4	3	1	2	0	3	2	+1
Seychelles	0	3	0	0	3	3	10	–7

November 15, 1992

Kenya	1–1	Uganda
Nandwa		Sekalye

November 16, 1992

Tanzania B	3–0	Seychelles
Yousuf 24'; Michael 33'; Gonzalez 89' (o.g.)

November 18, 1992

Kenya	2–1	Seychelles
Magongo 40'; Bruse 42' (o.g.)		Muhidin 51'

November 19, 1992

Tanzania B	1–1	Uganda
Razak 48'		Ssimbwa 13'

November 21, 1992

Uganda	5–2	Seychelles
Mayanja 2'; Ssemogerere 48' (pen.); Chembe 51'; Ssekatawa 78'; Yassim 88'		Mosehl 11'; Rose 19'

November 22, 1992

Tanzania B	0–0	Kenya

=== Group B ===
Played in Mwanza

Team	Pts	Pld	W	D	L	GF	GA	GD
Malawi	7	4	3	1	0	7	3	+4
Zambia	6	4	3	0	1	13	4	+11
Tanzania A	3	4	1	1	2	4	5	–1
Ethiopia	2	4	1	0	3	7	7	0
Zanzibar	2	4	1	0	3	2	14	–12

November 15, 1992

Ethiopia	3–0	Zanzibar
Asnaka

November 16, 1992

Tanzania A	1–1	Malawi
Minde 71' (pen.)		Chimodzi 69'

November 17, 1992

Zambia	3–2	Ethiopia
Chikwalakwala 7'; Chomba 44' (pen.), 49'		Begashaw 44' (pen.), 79' (pen.)

November 18, 1992

Tanzania A	0–1	Zanzibar
		Lambo 48'

November 19, 1992

Malawi	1–0	Zambia
Mtawali 4'

November 20, 1992

Tanzania A	2–1	Ethiopia
Mwamba 4'; Minde 43'		Asnaka 56'

November 21, 1992

Zambia	8–0	Zanzibar
Mutale 8', 57', 58'; Banda 3', 75'; Makinka 44', 55'; Ibrahim 37' (o.g.)

November 22, 1992

Ethiopia	1–2	Malawi
Kebede 64'		Waya 21', 51'

November 23, 1992

Tanzania A	1–2	Zambia
Lunyamila 11'		Mutale 33', 56'

November 24, 1992

Malawi	3–1	Zanzibar
Mtawali 33'; Waya 70'; Lungu 89'		Chimodzi 30' (o.g.)

== Knockout stage ==
=== Semi-finals ===
November 25, 1992

Uganda	0–0 (a.e.t.)	Zambia
Penalties
	4–2

Mwanza
November 25, 1992

Tanzania B	1–0	Malawi
Chambua 60'

Arusha

=== Third place match ===
November 28, 1992

Zambia	4–0	Malawi
Banda; Mutale

Mwanza

=== Final ===
November 28, 1992

Uganda	1–0	Tanzania B
Sekatawa 77'

Mwanza
