= Kangwa =

Kangwa is a surname. Notable people with the surname include:

- Bruce Kangwa, Zimbabwean footballer
- Edward Kangwa, Zambian footballer
- Evans Kangwa, Zambian footballer
- Godfrey Kangwa, Zambian footballer
- Kings Kangwa, Zambian footballer
- Patrick K. Kangwa, Zambian civil servant
