= Steve Trittschuh =

American soccer coach and former player (born 1965)

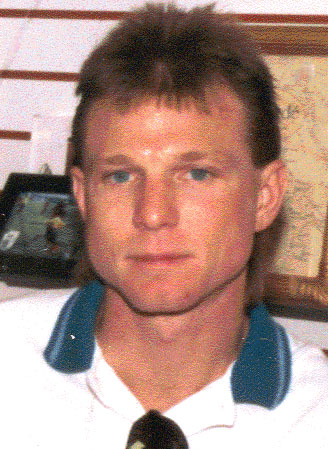

Personal information
- Full name: Stephen Trittschuh
- Date of birth: April 24, 1965 (age 61)
- Place of birth: Granite City, Illinois, U.S.
- Height: 6 ft 0 in (1.83 m)
- Position: Defender

College career
Years	Team	Apps	(Gls)
1983–1986	SIU Edwardsville Cougars		

Senior career*
Years	Team	Apps	(Gls)
1987–1988	St. Louis Steamers (indoor)	37	(5)
1988–1989	Busch Seniors		
1989–1990	Tampa Bay Rowdies		
1990–1991	Sparta Prague	13	(1)
1991–1992	Tampa Bay Rowdies	23	(2)
1992–1993	SVV Dordrecht		
1993	Tampa Bay Rowdies	23	(7)
1994	Fort Lauderdale Strikers		
1994–1995	St. Louis Ambush (indoor)	31	(1)
1995	Montreal Impact	22	(3)
1995–1996	Tampa Bay Terror (indoor)	6	(2)
1996–1999	Colorado Rapids	98	(11)
1999–2001	Tampa Bay Mutiny	64	(7)
Total		317	(39)

International career
1987–1995	United States	37	(2)

Managerial career
- 1989: SIU Edwardsville Cougars (assistant)
- 2002–2006: Colorado Rapids (assistant)
- 2015–2019: Colorado Springs Switchbacks
- 2020: Saint Louis FC
Medal record
Representing United States (as player)
Winner	CONCACAF Gold Cup	1991
Runner-up	CONCACAF Championship	1989
Men's Soccer
- * Club domestic league appearances and goals

Stephen "Steve" Trittschuh (born April 24, 1965) is an American soccer coach and former player who most recently served as head coach of USL Championship side Saint Louis FC. As a player, he played as a defender in the Major Indoor Soccer League, American Professional Soccer League and Major League Soccer. He also earned thirty-eight caps with the United States men's national soccer team including one game at the 1990 FIFA World Cup.

== Player ==
=== Youth ===
Trittschuh is a native of Granite City, Illinois. He played at Granite City High School North for the Steelers under former U.S. national coach Bob Kehoe. He earned All State honors his junior and senior year and was a Parade Magazine All American as a senior. Coming out of high school, he was heavily recruited by several top schools, but selected Southern Illinois University Edwardsville which he attended on a full ride soccer scholarship. He played for four years for SIUE, scoring 12 goals and assisting 11 others. He earned second-team All-American honors his junior year and first team his senior year. He was a 2011 inductee into the SIUE Athletic Hall of Fame.

=== Professional ===
In 1987, the St. Louis Steamers selected Trittschuh in the second round of the Major Indoor Soccer League draft. He played one season with the Steamers, then filed for free agency in April 1987 when the Steamers ceased operations.

That summer, he played for the U.S. national team as it prepared for and then played at the 1988 Summer Olympics. In October 1988, the United States Soccer Federation signed American players to the national team. Trittschuh was among fourteen players signed by the USSF.

From the spring of 1988 through the spring of 1989, Trittschuh played for the amateur Busch Seniors of St. Louis when not playing for the Olympic or national teams.

On May 4, 1989, he signed on loan with the Tampa Bay Rowdies of the American Soccer League. He continued with the Rowdies as the team played in the newly formed American Professional Soccer League.

In 1990, his career took an unexpected turn. Trittschuh played a single game for the United States men's national soccer team at the 1990 FIFA World Cup in a 5–1 loss to Czechoslovakia. While the national team was thrashed, Trittschuh caught the attention of the Czechoslovakia's assistant coach, the head coach of Czech powerhouse club Sparta Prague. Sparta Prague offered Trittschuh a contract, which he accepted. At the time the Soviet Union and its eastern bloc allies, including Czechoslovakia were transitioning from communism to democracy. This brought an exceptional level of turmoil which also affected professional soccer in the region. As a result, eastern teams were searching for talent to replace players who were moving to play in Western Europe. Trittschuh was one of just three foreign players in the Czechoslovak First League in the 1990–91 season, alongside Zambian Timothy Mwitwa, who also played for Sparta Prague, and Aleksandr Bokiy of the USSR, who played for Sigma Olomouc. While Trittschuh played only a single season for Sparta Prague, he helped them win their league championship. He also became the first U.S. player to play in the European Cup.

At the end of the season, he returned to the Rowdies for two seasons.

In the fall of 1992, Trittschuh signed with Dutch club SVV Dordrecht. As he recounts it, he was in competition with two Finnish players for a spot on the club and he won. He became a regular starter for the team, but towards the end of the season the club ran out of money and stopped paying Trittschuh, so he returned to the U.S.

In the spring of 1993, he rejoined the Tampa Bay Rowdies.

On April 6, 1994, he moved to the Fort Lauderdale Strikers of the American Professional Soccer League.

On November 30, 1994, he signed with the St. Louis Ambush of the National Professional Soccer League (NPSL). That year he earned another championship when the Ambush took the NPSL crown.

In 1995, he moved to the Montreal Impact of the APSL. In 1995, the new U.S. soccer league, Major League Soccer (MLS) approached Trittschuh about joining the league. He agreed but had to buy out the final year of his contract with the Impact, for $10,000. When he left the Impact, he finished his APSL (now USL First Division) as a 5 time all star.

In November 1995, he joined the Tampa Bay Terror of the NPSL.

In 1996, Trittschuh joined the new Colorado Rapids. In 1997, the team reached the 1997 MLS Cup, falling to 2–1 to D.C. United. He had a solid three seasons with the Rapids playing in the sweeper position. At the beginning of the 1999 season, Rapids coach Glenn Myernick moved Marcelo Balboa into the sweeper position. As a result, through the first 8 games of the 1999 season, Trittschuh never left the bench.

On June 14, 1999, the Rapids traded Trittschuh to the Tampa Bay Mutiny for midfielder/forward Guillermo Jara. Trittschuh would go on to play 64 regular and post-season games for the Mutiny.

In 2001, he retired from active playing and was hired by the Colorado Rapids as an assistant coach, serving for four years and leading the reserve team to the 2006 MLS reserve title.

As of 2013, he is the technical director of Denver's Colorado Storm youth team.

=== National team ===
Trittschuh also had a long and successful national team career. In 1987, he was selected to play for the U.S. national team. He made his national team debut against Egypt at the 1987 President's Cup. He also played for the national team at the 1987 Pan American Games.

In 1988, he was a member of the U.S. team which went 1–1–1 at the Seoul Olympics. As previously mentioned, he was a member of the U.S. team at the 1990 FIFA World Cup and played the full 90 minutes in their opening game against Czechoslovakia. He was also a member of the 1991 Gold Cup championship team. In 1995, he played his last game with the national team, against Saudi Arabia.

== Coach ==
In 1989, Trittschuh served as an assistant coach with the Southern Illinois University Edwardsville men's soccer team. In 2003, he became an assistant coach with the Colorado Rapids.

He was named head coach of USL's Colorado Springs Switchbacks FC in advance of their inaugural 2015 season.

In January 2020, Trittschuh was named head coach of Saint Louis FC.
