= Estébanez =

Estébanez is a surname. Notable people with the name include:

- Delio Morollón Estébanez (1937–1992), Spanish footballer
- Enrique Estébanez (1912–?), Spanish field hockey player
- Fabrice Estebanez (born 1981), French rugby player
- Rosa Estebanez (1927–1991), Cuban-born American sculptor
- Serafín Estébanez Calderón (1799–1867), Spanish author
