= Aleksandr Bokiy =

Russian footballer

Personal information
- Full name: Aleksandr Konstantinovich Bokiy
- Date of birth: 3 May 1957 (age 69)
- Place of birth: Lida, Belarusian SSR
- Height: 1.80 m (5 ft 11 in)
- Position: Defender

Youth career
- DYuSSh Shchuchin

Senior career*
Years	Team	Apps	(Gls)
1974–1975	Khimik Grodno	27	(1)
1976	Dynamo Stavropol	20	(0)
1978–1980	Dynamo Moscow	18	(0)
1981	Dynamo Stavropol	36	(2)
1982–1986	Lokomotiv Moscow	203	(11)
1987–1990	Spartak Moscow	41	(0)
1990–1992	Sigma Olomouc	48	(0)
1992	MFK Topoľčany		
1993	TJ Sigma Lutín		
1994–1997	Unex Uničov		

Managerial career
- 1992: MFK Topoľčany
- 1993: TJ Sigma Lutín
- 1994–1997: Unex Uničov
- 1997: LeRK Prostějov (assistant)
- 1998–1999: Chmel Blšany (academy)
- 2000: Ozeta Dukla Trenčín
- 2001: 1. HFK Olomouc
- 2003: Spartak Shchyolkovo
- 2004–2005: Zenit Saint Petersburg (scout)
- 2005–2006: Spartak Moscow (scout)
- 2006–2007: Zenit Saint Petersburg (scout)
- 2008: Zenit Saint Petersburg (director of sports)
- 2009: Khimki (assistant)
- 2009–2012: Dynamo Moscow (head scout)
- 2013–2015: SK Hranice
- 2016: Anzhi Makhachkala (assistant)
- * Club domestic league appearances and goals

Aleksandr Konstantinovich Bokiy (Russian: Александр Константинович Бокий; born 3 May 1957) is a Belarusian and Russian professional football coach and a former player.

Born in Lida, Belarusian SSR, Bokiy appeared in 57 Soviet Top League matches and was awarded Master of Sport of the USSR in 1979. He subsequently moved to Czechoslovakia to play for Sigma Olomouc, being one of just three foreign players to feature in the 1990–91 Czechoslovak First League, alongside Sparta Prague duo Steve Trittschuh and Timothy Mwitwa.

== Honours ==
- Soviet Top League champion: 1987, 1989.

== European club competitions ==
- UEFA Cup 1987–88 with FC Spartak Moscow: 4 games.
- UEFA Cup 1989–90 with FC Spartak Moscow: 2 games.
- UEFA Cup 1991–92 with SK Sigma Olomouc: 1 game.
