= Andrew Kamanga =

Zambian Football administrator

President of FAZ
- In office 19 March 2016 – 8 May 2025
- Vice President: Richard Kazala
- Preceded by: Kalusha Bwalya
- Succeeded by: Keith Mweemba

Personal details
- Born: Andrew Ndanga Kamanga; 21 December 1966 (age 59) Kabwe, Zambia
- Occupation: Sports administrator

Andrew Ndanga Kamanga (born 21 December 1966) is a Zambian football administrator and was president of the Football Association of Zambia (FAZ) from 2016 to 2025. Previously, he was the chairman of Kabwe Warriors F.C. and was elected president during the FAZ Annual General Meeting on 19 March 2016, replacing Kalusha Bwalya.

== Early life ==
Kamanga was born in Kabwe and attended Kalonga Secondary School, where he played football for the school team as a right winger and harboured ambitions of emulating his heroes by playing for Kabwe Warriors but his father advised him to concentrate on school instead.

Upon completion of his secondary school education, he proceeded to the University of Zambia branch in the Copperbelt Province (now known as the Copperbelt University) from 1986 to 1990 and obtained a Bachelor of Accountancy degree. He continued his management accountancy studies at London City University in England from 1992 to 1994 and later obtained an MSc degree in Energy and Environmental Technology and Economics from the same institution.

== Career ==
After finishing high school, Kamanga first worked as a clerk at Bank of Credit and Commerce in 1985 before proceeding to university. He joined accounting firm Price Waterhouse after graduation in 1991 and briefly worked for Meridian BIAO Bank in 1994 before crossing over to auditing firm KPMG. In 1996, he joined electrical engineering firm Asea Brown Boveri and two years later, joined the newly established Zambian Energy Regulation Board (ERB) as Head of Economic Regulation.

In 2001 Kamanga established ENFIN Solutions, which operates as an energy and financial advisory firm and in 2007 he founded North Western Energy, a private power utility company involved in distribution of electricity to Lumwana Mine, parts of Solwezi and Kalumbila Mine in the North-Western Province of Zambia.

=== Club administration ===
Kamanga first served as Kabwe Warriors Committee Member from 2008 to 2010 after which he took over as chairman. He then resigned his position three years later and served on the Power Dynamos F.C. executive from December 2013 to March 2015.

=== FAZ ===
==== 2011 FAZ Vote of No Confidence ====
Kamanga first attempted to ascend to the FAZ top post in 2010 when four members of the FAZ executive resigned and effectively dissolved the association's executive due to the inability to form a quorum.

In line with the FAZ constitution an interim executive headed by Kamanga was voted into office by two thirds of the association's affiliates in a meeting held in Lusaka and Bwalya's executive held its own meeting the following day in Kabwe which also garnered a two thirds majority and ratified the co-option of four new executive members.

Despite the National Sports Council of Zambia (NSCZ) ruling that Bwalya's executive was illegal, FIFA’s stance was that they only recognized Bwalya's executive but if the two factions did not resolve the matter, Zambia would be banned from international football.

With no resolution in sight, Zambian President Rupiah Banda, a keen soccer follower, appealed to FIFA President Sepp Blatter to help find a solution and the world soccer governing body arranged a meeting between the two camps at FIFA headquarters in Zurich on 20 December 2010. In the meeting chaired by Blatter and attended by General Secretary Jerome Valcke, the rival factions and CAF and NSCZ representatives, the world soccer governing body ruled that Bwalya was the legitimate FAZ president and in the event that some FAZ members wanted to table a motion of no confidence against Bwalya and his Executive Committee, such a motion would have to be presented at the next general council scheduled for 30 April 2011.

As the date of the Annual General Meeting drew nearer, FAZ Division II side Mazabuka United moved a motion to pass a vote of no confidence in Bwalya's executive which, if supported by two thirds of the FAZ affiliates, meant the end for Bwalya and his executive and the ushering in of an interim executive into office.

On the day of the meeting which was attended by two FIFA officials, preliminary issues were dealt with swiftly and when it came to the vote of no confidence, Kamanga's faction was stunned when FAZ General Secretary George Kasengele informed the councilors that Mazabuka United had written a letter to FAZ earlier that day to withdraw the motion to table the vote of no confidence and noise erupted. Kamanga's efforts to have the motion reinstated were in vain and Bwalya continued as FAZ President.

==== 2016 FAZ Elections ====
Zambia's 2012 AFCON triumph guaranteed Bwalya another four-year term and he easily romped to a landslide victory against his former Vice-president Emmanuel Munaile. Early in 2015, Kamanga signaled his intention to stand as FAZ President and mounted a spirited campaign based on his SCORE theme (Structure of the league, Coaches education, Organisation of the FAZ, Referee education, Everything else) which he espoused in his country-wide campaigns.

He promised accountability, transparency and the intention to share part of the proceeds of FIFA's annual grant with FAZ affiliates. He also pledged to introduce a league independent from the FAZ and to restore Zambia's football reputation.

With the odds heavily stacked against him, Kamanga emerged the winner in what turned out to be a very tight race, getting 163 votes against Bwalya's 156. In his victory speech, Kamanga spoke of turning a new page in the country's soccer history against the backdrop of change and reforms at the World stage and that Zambia would not be spared from these changes.

He called for a concerted effort from all stakeholders and stated that his administration would not practice retribution against Bwalya and other heroes but promised to uphold and promote the FAZ Constitution and FIFA regulations and most of all respect the law of the land.

==== Relationship with Kalusha Bwalya ====
On 15 June 2016, Kamanga attended a Press Freedom Committee discussion in Lusaka and was asked about his relationship with his predecessor. He responded that it was "very bad," and went on to describe what had transpired three days previously.

According to Kamanga, following an invitation by the Nigeria Football Association to the launch of a newly launched Under-13 football league with FIFA President Gianni Infantino as guest of honour as well as Nigeria's president, Major-General Muhammadu Buhari in attendance, a Bwalya fanatic called Godfrey Chikumbi who constantly insults Kamanga using social media posted on Facebook that Kamanga had been invited by Boko Haram while Bwalya had been invited by the UN to attend a football tournament in honour of football legends in New York City.

The link to the terrorist group provoked Kamanga into exchanging text messages with Chikumbi, telling him to keep what he termed as ‘Kalusha Bwalya nonsense’ to himself. Within minutes, Bwalya called Kamanga and verbally abused him.

==== Assault by political cadres ====
In August 2016, a fake video was circulated on social media with the claim that Kamanga had attended a press briefing by opposition United Party for National Development (UPND) leader Hakainde Hichilema. When it was brought to his attention, Kamanga denied being the person in the video and stated that he and FAZ were not partisan.

On 28 August 2016, Kamanga was at United Church of Zambia Saint Andrews Church in Lusaka for the reception of the Synod Bishop which Zambian President Edgar Lungu was also in attendance, and when he attempted to greet Lungu, Kamanga was attacked by about ten Patriotic Front cadres, forcing him to run back into the church for safety.

After being treated in hospital, Kamanga accused Bwalya of being one of those who were behind the attack, which the former FAZ President denied and threatened legal action.

Preceded by Kalusha Bwalya	FAZ President; 2016-2025	Succeeded by Keith Mweemba
