= Yveta Synek Graff =

Czech vocal coach and writer (died 2015)

- Born: November 18, 1933; Prague, Czechoslovakia
- Died: November 6, 2015 (aged 81); Montecito, California
- Occupations: Writer, Vocal Coach

Yveta Synek Graff (November 18, 1933, Prague, Czechoslovakia — November 6, 2015, Montecito, California) was a Czech-born American vocal and language coach and writer who helped popularize the performances of Czech operas internationally during the last quarter of the 20th century and early 21st century. Considered one of the world's leading authorities on Czech operas, she was described by The New York Times as the "secret weapon of Czech opera’s velvet revolution".

She was widely admired for her translations of Czech operas into English which were utilized in performances by companies like the Metropolitan Opera and the Lyric Opera of Chicago. She also coached artists for performances in Czech; including working on productions for the Glyndebourne Festival Opera, the Los Angeles Opera, the New York City Opera, the San Francisco Opera, and The Royal Opera in London among others.

== Life and career ==
The daughter of writer Emil Synek and actress Emilie Budlová, Yveta Synek was born in Prague on November 18, 1933. In 1947 she moved with her mother to Paris; joining her father in that country after they had been separated during World War II. She was trained as a singer at the Conservatoire de Paris, but never pursued a performance career. She moved to the United States in the 1950s; settling in New York City in 1956 where she married and had two children. She was a socialite in New York City, and after divorcing her first husband, married the banker Malcolm Graff.

Graff first worked as a vocal and diction coach in opera in 1977 for a concert version of Bedřich Smetana's Dalibor which was performed by the Opera Orchestra of New York (OONY) and conductor Eve Queler. While the principal singers were Czech and did not need assistance with the language, the chorus was American and Graff was brought in to prepare that ensemble in the Czech language. She later re-united with Queler and the OONY in 1986 to prepare the principle singers (this time non-Czech vocalists) and the chorus in the Czech language for the United States premiere of Smetana's Libuše.

With Robert T. Jones, Graff co-wrote an English-language translation of Leoš Janáček's The Cunning Little Vixen which was used by the New York City Opera (NYCO) for its 1981 production of that work with Gianna Rolandi in the title role. She and Jones collaborated on the English translation of a second opera by Janáček, From the House of the Dead, for that opera's first complete performance in America which was given in a concert version by the New York Philharmonic at Avery Fisher Hall in 1983. This translation was later re-used for a fully staged production of the opera given by the NYCO in 1990. For this same opera she wrote French-language supertitles when it was staged by the Paris Opera.

Graff wrote an English translation of Jenůfa for the Seattle Opera's spring 1985 production of the opera with Jones assisting in the editing of her translation. The Metropolitan Opera also used this translation for its production in its 1985-1986 season with Roberta Alexander in the title role. In 1986 she assisted the San Francisco Opera (SFO) for its production of Jenůfa performed in the original Czech; writing English-language supertitles for its production. This was the second time she had worked for the SFO on that opera; having previously prepared its singers in this work when the opera was given in 1980.

In 1988 the Spoleto Festival USA used her English-language translation of Antonín Dvořák's Rusalka with Mignon Dunn as the witch Jezibaba and Maria Spacagna in the title role. That same year she prepared the Los Angeles Opera's chorus and principal cast in the Czech language for the company's production of Káťa Kabanová.

Graff died in Montecito, California on November 6, 2015. Her son was the documentary film maker, writer, and academic Brett J. Love.
