= Aurangabad Airport =

Airport in Aurangabad, Maharashtra, India

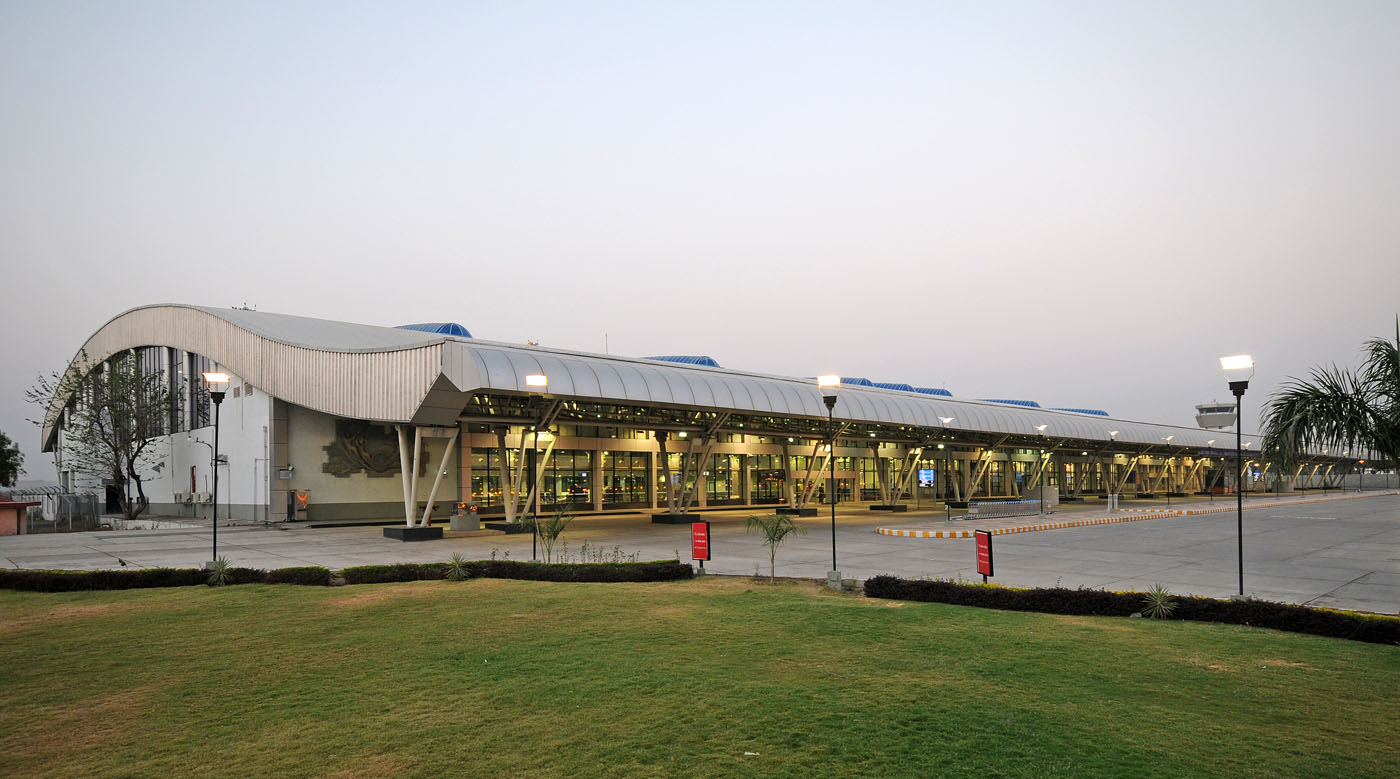
- IATA: IXU; ICAO: VAAU

Summary
- Airport type: Public
- Operator: Airports Authority of India
- Serves: Aurangabad
- Location: Chikalthana, Aurangabad, Maharashtra, India
- Elevation AMSL: 1,917 ft (584 m)
- Coordinates: 19°51′46″N 75°23′53″E
- Website: Aurangabad Airport

Map
- Location of airport in Maharashtra IXU (India)

Runways
Direction	Length		Surface
Direction	ft	m	Surface
09/27	9,300	2,835	Concrete/Asphalt

Statistics (April 2025 – March 2026)
- Passengers: 6,28,152 (▼10.3%)
- Aircraft movements: 5,360 (▼20.6%)
- Cargo tonnage: 1,362.6 (▲48.9%)
- Source: AAI

Aurangabad Airport (IATA: IXU, ICAO: VAAU) is a customs airport (Note: Airport with customs checking and clearance facility, and handles predominantly domestic traffic. A very limited number of international flights are allowed to operate from the airport.) serving the city of Aurangabad, Maharashtra, India. It is located at Chikalthana, about 5.5 km (3.4 mi) east of the city centre and 11 km from Aurangabad Railway Station, along the Aurangabad–Nagpur State Highway. The airport is owned and operated by the Airports Authority of India, with one passenger terminal covering 190,000 square feet of floor area and two aerobridges.

In March 2020, the Government of Maharashtra proposed to rename the airport as Chhatrapati Sambhaji Maharaj Airport after the Maratha ruler Sambhaji. In December 2025, the Government of India released an order for the airport to be renamed as Chhatrapati Sambhajinagar Airport. However, as it differed from the original proposal of the state government, and the renaming was later put on hold by the Airports Authority of India.

== Airlines and destinations ==
Airlines	Destinations
Air India	Delhi
Air India Express	Delhi
IndiGo	Bengaluru, Delhi, Goa–Dabolim, Hyderabad, Mumbai–Shivaji, Navi Mumbai,

== Accidents and incidents ==
- On 22 September 1988, A Vayudoot Dornier 228 (registered VT-EJT) was on a scheduled flight from Dr. Babasaheb Ambedkar International Airport, Nagpur to Aurangabad Airport. While landing at Aurangabad, it encountered bad weather and crashed at the undershoot of Runway 27. There were no fatalities. The aircraft was substantially damaged and written-off.
- On 26 April 1993, Indian Airlines Flight 491 (IC 491), a Boeing 737-2A8 (registered VT-ECQ) was on its connecting route from Delhi to Mumbai with en route stops at Jaipur, Udaipur and Aurangabad. The heavily laden aircraft started its takeoff from Aurangabad's runway 09 in hot and humid temperatures. After lifting off almost at the end of the runway, it impacted heavily with a lorry on a highway at the end of the runway. The left main landing gear and left engine bottom cowling and thrust reverser impacted the left side of the truck at a height of nearly seven feet above the road. Then the aircraft struck high-tension power lines nearly 3 km northeast of the runway and hit the ground. The aircraft was carrying 112 passengers and 6 crew members. 63 persons including the pilot, the co-pilot, and 2 other crew members survived. 53 passengers and 2 crew members died.

== See also ==
- List of airports in Maharashtra
- List of airports in India
- List of busiest airports in India
