= Fabian Fahl =

German politician (born 1993)

Member of the Bundestag
- Incumbent
- Assumed office 2025
- Constituency: North Rhine-Westphalia

Personal details
- Born: 20 March 1993 (age 33) Düsseldorf, Germany
- Party: The Left
- Education: RWTH Aachen University
- Occupation: Academic
- Website: fabian-fahl.de

Fabian Fahl (born 20 March 1993) is a German politician and member of the Bundestag. A member of The Left, he has represented North Rhine-Westphalia since 2025.

Fahl was born on 20 March 1993 in Düsseldorf. He has a Bachelor of Science degree in applied geography (2017) and a Master of Science degree in economic geography (2019) from RWTH Aachen University. He was a research analyst at the German Advisory Council on Global Change (WBGU) from January 2020 to October 2020. He has been a research assistant in the Economic Geography Department at RWTH since April 2020 and is currently studying for a Doctor of Philosophy degree.

Fahl was The Left's candidate in Aachen I (constituency 86) at the 2025 federal election but was not elected. He was however elected to the Bundestag on The Left's state list in North Rhine-Westphalia.
