= Eighteam =

- Directed by: Juan Rodriguez-Briso
- Written by: Juan Rodriguez-Briso
- Produced by: Juan Rodriguez-Briso; Ngosa Chungu (co-producer)
- Starring: Kalusha Bwalya
- Cinematography: Pablo García-Sanz
- Edited by: Leandro Tolchinsky
- Music by: Michael Nyman
- Production companies: Omnicorp Estudio; Purple Tembo Media
- Release date: 2015
- Running time: 70 minutes
- Countries: Spain; Zambia
- Language: English

Eighteam is a 2015 Spanish/Zambian documentary film written and directed by Juan Rodriguez-Briso. It is based on the true story of the Zambia national football team. The team are commonly known as Chipolopolo - the "copper bullets" and the film follows their journey from tragedy to glory.

== Plot ==
In the late 1980s and early 1990s, Chipolopolo were a very promising national football team and in the 1988 Olympic Games in Seoul they surprised the world, and thrashed Italy 4-0. Following this victory, they had their eyes on winning the Africa Cup of Nations trophy and qualifying for their first World Cup in 1994.

This was not meant to be. On 27 April 1993, a Zambian Air Force plane carrying the team, coaches and administrative staff, ditched into the Atlantic Ocean about 500 metres offshore from Libreville, Gabon. All passengers and crew, including 18 players, died in the accident. Chipolopolo's captain, Kalusha Bwalya was not aboard the ill-fated flight as he was in the Netherlands playing for PSV at that time and had made separate arrangements to make his own way to Senegal to take part in the match. Two other players, Charles Musonda and Johnson Bwalya also were not aboard. The Football Association of Zambia then put all their efforts into building a new team. The new team qualified for the 1994 Africa Cup of Nations and only lost to Nigeria in the final. Kalusha Bwalya, went on to become the national team coach and president of the Football Association of Zambia.

Eighteen years and 9 months later, Zambia won the 2012 Africa Cup of Nations in Gabon and Equatorial Guinea, with the finals taking place a short distance from the place of the 1993 crash. Zambia became African champions for the first time, beating the favourite Ivory Coast after a long penalty shoot-out.

The film's name is derived from the fact that 18 players perished in the crash, there were 18 penalties in the final and 18 years between the crash and the final match.

== Release ==
Eighteam premiered in Lusaka (Zambia) on the 50th anniversary of Zambia's independence. Since then, the film has been screened in several film festivals worldwide.

Year	Festival	Category
2014	Semana Internacional de Cine de Valladolid 2014 (Spain)	Castilla y León en Largo
2015	3rd Thinking Football Film Festival Bilbao (Spain)	Official Selection
2015	International Movie Awards (Indonesia)	Official Selection
2015	2nd Offside Fest Barcelona (Spain)	Official Selection
2015	12th 11mm Film Festival Berlin (Germany)	Official Selection
2015	Overtime Festival Mexicali (Mexico)	Official Selection
2015	Cannes Cinephile Film Festival (France)	
2015	5th Lights, Camera, Africa Film Festival (Nigeria)	Official Selection
2015	6th Silicon Valley African Film Festival (United States)	Official Selection
2015	2nd Lusaka International Film Festival (Zambia)	Official Selection
2015	6th African Film Festival (Nigeria)	Official Selection
2015	6th Cinefoot Film Festival (Brazil)	Official Selection
2015	1st Minuto90 Film Festival (Peru)	Official Selection

== Awards ==
Year	Award	Category	Result
2015	Offside Fest Barcelona	Audience Award	Winner
2015	Silicon Valley African Film Festival	Best Documentary	Winner
2015	African Film Festival Nigeria	Best Documentary	Winner
2015	International Movie Awards	Golden Award Best Documentary	Winner
2015	Minuto 90 Film Festival Peru	Best Documentary	Winner

== See also ==
- List of association football films
