= Düsseldorfer Jazz-Rally =

German annual music festival

Düsseldorfer Jazz-Rally is an annual jazz festival in Düsseldorf, Germany. This music festival began in 1993 on an early summer weekend and has continued to occur on the same weekend every year since. The festival has taken place in Pentecost since 2016. This is the most visited jazz festival in all of Germany.

== History ==
The music festival is based on the Jazz Rally of Brussels and was initially held during June 25 to 27 of 1993 under the name Brussels Jazz Rally. [1] [2]

The ninth edition of the Düsseldorfer Jazz Rally lasted from June 25 to July 1, 2001. During this specific edition of the music festival, the concerts began taking place partly outdoors, despite intermittent rains the festival had 280,000 people in attendance. [3] In recent years, the number of visitors is regularly a quarter of a million of people of more. [4]

=== Sparda Jazz Award ===
Since 2012, a Jazz Award has been annually awarded to a young, talented, jazz musician aged 18 to 28 years old. The sponsor of this award is the Foundation for Arts, Culture and Social Affairs of Sparda Bank West. [5] The three top finishers will receive, in addition to a live performance during the rally, a cash prize of $3435.97 for first place and a cash prize of $1717.99 for both second and third place. The panel of judges consists of either 4 or 5 judges that are generally musicians, jazz producers, music journalists, or the board of the Sparda-West-Stiftung. There are two permanent members of the judges panel and they are patron Klaus Doldinger and board of the foundation member, Ursula Wißborn. This competition has had several celebrity hosts, including: pianist Sebastian Gahler in 2013, jazz producer Rudiger Herzog in 2014, and WDR music journalist Karsten Mützelfeldt in 2014. Initially, this competition was intended to last for three years, but it was extended for two years until 2018. [5] Additionally, it will begin on June 6, 2019, and end on June 9, 2019. [7]

Schauinsland-Reisen acquired the naming rights of the festival from 2016 to 2020 as a part of a sponsorship agreement. This is why the festival is now called the Dusseldorf Jazz Rally. [6]

=== Procedure ===
Spectators are offered a selection of more than 80 concerts at approximately 30 venues from Thursday through Sunday. Transportation is an additional cost, so most people travel by foot. The quick foot travel was the inspiration for the Rally portion of the festival's name. Although the festival is predominately geared toward Jazz, it features a variety of music genres, ranging from pop to rock. [6]

== Ticketing Information ==
Visitors of the festival are able to see several concerts for free during each day of the festival. The festival requires a single ticket for an entire day of concerts, this is referred to as Tagesticket or a one-day ticket. Festival-goers are also welcome to purchase the Jazz Rally Button, which consists of a 3-day ticket and free transportation via the VRR. Additionally, the Dusseldorf Jazz Rally features optional concerts that require an additional ticket. [8]
