= National Sports Council of Zambia =

National Sports Council of Zambia (NSCZ) is a sports council based in Zambia. They have considerable power in sports policy in Zambia and were responsible for banning Faz president Kalusha Bwalya from all official sporting engagements.
