= Stanwood Duval =

American judge (born 1942)

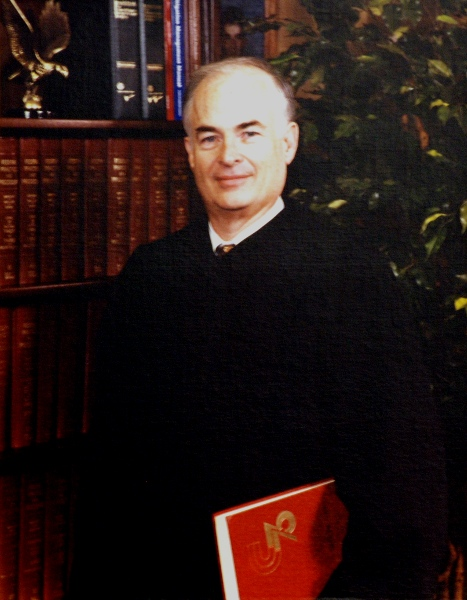

Senior Judge of the United States District Court for the Eastern District of Louisiana
- In office December 15, 2008 – January 31, 2017

Judge of the United States District Court for the Eastern District of Louisiana
- In office September 29, 1994 – December 15, 2008
- Appointed by: Bill Clinton
- Preceded by: George Arceneaux
- Succeeded by: Nannette Jolivette Brown

Personal details
- Born: Stanwood Richardson Duval Jr. February 8, 1942 (age 84) New Orleans, Louisiana
- Party: Democratic
- Education: Louisiana State University (BA); Louisiana State University Law School (LLB)

Stanwood Richardson Duval Jr. (born February 8, 1942) is a former United States district judge of the United States District Court for the Eastern District of Louisiana. He was appointed by U.S. President Bill Clinton in 1994.

== Early career ==
Duval was born to Stanwood Richardson Duval Sr. (1913–2001), and the former Bonnie Parker Faught. He was raised in Houma, the seat of Terrebonne Parish, where his father operated a successful insurance business and was prominent in community affairs. He graduated from Louisiana State University in Baton Rouge, in 1964 with a Bachelor of Arts degree, and from the Louisiana State University Law School in 1966 with a Bachelor of Laws. He practiced law from 1966 to 1994 in Houma eventually becoming a senior partner of Duval, Funderburk, Sundbery and Lovell, LP. At the age of 31, Duval served as an elected delegate to the 1973 Louisiana Constitutional Convention, where he served on committees for rules of procedure and for the executive branch. In 1994, he assumed his seat of the federal bench having been confirmed by the U.S. Senate on September 28, 1994. Duval succeeded Judge George Arceneaux, who was Duval's former law partner, who died in office in 1993. He was also the assistant city attorney of Houma from 1970 to 1972 and the attorney for the consolidated Terrebonne Parish government from 1988 to 1993.

== Federal judicial service ==
Duval was nominated by President Bill Clinton on July 15, 1994, to a seat vacated by Judge George Arceneaux He was confirmed by the United States Senate on September 28, 1994, and received commission on September 29, 1994. He served as a member of the Advisory Committee on Appellate Rules to the Judicial Conference of the United States Courts from 1997 to 2003, the Council of the Louisiana Law Institute from 1996 to 2000, and the Fifth Circuit Judicial Council from 2004 to 2007. Attorneys evaluating his time on the bench commented that he was "an extremely bright guy and he's very knowledgeable about complex litigation as well as complex business transactions." Some noted that he was "courteous, patient and approachable." "Lawyers who represent both plaintiffs and defendants in civil cases said Duval is neutral. . . . 'He has no leanings that are apparent.'" He assumed senior status on December 15, 2008. His service terminated on January 31, 2017, due to retirement.

== Family connections ==
A Democrat, Duval is a nephew of former state Senator Claude B. Duval, (1914–1986), a conservative Democrat who represented mostly Terrebonne and neighboring St. Mary Parish between 1968 and 1980 and ran unsuccessfully in 1964 for lieutenant governor. Stanwood Duval's brother, C. Berwick Duval II (born November 1, 1955), is a prominent Houma attorney.

== Notable rulings ==
Duval issued an injunction in 2000 which barred the State of Louisiana from issuing "Choose Life" vanity automobile license plates, as the legislature had approved in 1999. Duval ruled in favor of Planned Parenthood of America, which took the view that the choice of displaying the plates violated the First Amendment to the United States Constitution because there was no alternative display available for supporters of abortion. Duval's opinion was unanimously reversed by the Fifth Circuit Court of Appeals in New Orleans on April 13, 2005. A petition for rehearing en banc was filed by the plaintiffs and was denied by an eight to eight vote.

The judge became an object of political consideration in the 2003 gubernatorial campaign, when Republican candidate, Bobby L. Jindal, lashed out at "liberal" judges. According to WWL-TV's website: "A campaign mailing by supporters of . . . Jindal has a New Orleans–based federal judge and members of his Houma family seeing red. The literature, though it doesn't specifically name him, labels U.S. District Judge Stanwood Duval II, as a 'left-wing' jurist."

Most significantly, Duval presided over the litigation arising out of the Hurricane Katrina and the failure of the levee system. The court consolidated over 1,200 cases comprising hundred of thousands of claims and systematically adjudicated the lawsuits." Duval issued rulings in 2005 and 2006 in reference to the constitutional rights of victims of Hurricane Katrina. He extended the time that hurricane evacuees could continue receiving taxpayer-funded hotel stays. In addition to the Katrina rulings, on November 19, 2009, Duval ruled that the Army Corps of Engineers was negligent in maintaining flood protection that resulted in significant flooding during Katrina. On March 3, 2012, the Fifth Circuit Court of Appeals upheld Duval's ruling, agreeing that the Corps had failed to maintain the Mississippi River-Gulf Outlet.

== Notes ==
Legal offices
Preceded by George Arceneaux	Judge of the United States District Court for the Eastern District of Louisiana; 1994–2008	Succeeded by Nannette Jolivette Brown
