= Czesław Suszczyk =

Polish footballer

Personal information
- Full name: Czesław Gerard Suszczyk
- Date of birth: 4 January 1922
- Place of birth: Chorzów, Poland
- Date of death: 1 April 1993 (aged 71)
- Place of death: Chorzów, Poland
- Height: 1.69 m (5 ft 7 in)
- Position: Midfielder

Youth career
- 1936–1939: Azoty Chorzów

Senior career*
Years	Team	Apps	(Gls)
1946	Bamberg		
1946	Prezydent Chorzów		
1946–1959	Ruch Chorzów	233	(17)

International career
1949–1958	Poland	25	(0)

Managerial career
- 1957: Ruch Chorzów
- Dąb Katowice
- ROW Rybnik
- 1962: Stal Mielec
- * Club domestic league appearances and goals

Czesław Gerard Suszczyk (4 January 1922 – 1 April 1993) was a Polish footballer who played as a midfielder. He competed at the 1952 Summer Olympics.

== Honours ==
Ruch Chorzów

- Ekstraklasa: 1952, 1953
- Polish Cup: 1950–51
