= Moses Masuwa =

Zambian footballer (1971–1993)

Moses Masuwa (30 July 1971 – 27 April 1993) was a Zambian footballer and member of the national team. He was among those killed in the crash of the team plane in Gabon in 1993.
