= John Soko =

Zambian footballer (1968-1993)

Personal information
- Full name: John Soko
- Date of birth: 5 May 1968
- Place of birth: Zambia
- Date of death: 27 April 1993 (aged 24)
- Place of death: Atlantic Ocean, off Gabon
- Position: Defender

Senior career*
Years	Team	Apps	(Gls)
1988–1993	Nkana Red Devils		

International career
1988–1993	Zambia	26	(0)
- * Club domestic league appearances and goals

John Soko (5 May 1968 – 27 April 1993) was a Zambian football player and member of the national team. He was among those killed in the crash of the team plane in Gabon in 1993.

== Career ==
Soko played club football for Nkana F.C. in Zambia.

Soko made several appearances for the Zambia national football team and participated in the 1990 and 1992 African Cup of Nations finals.

== Career statistics ==
=== International ===
As of match played 25 April 1993.

Appearances and goals by national team and year
National team	Year	Apps	Goals
Zambia	1988	3	0
Zambia	1989	5	0
Zambia	1990	7	0
Zambia	1991	4	0
Zambia	1992	3	0
Zambia	1993	4	0
Total		26	0
