= George Arceneaux =

American judge

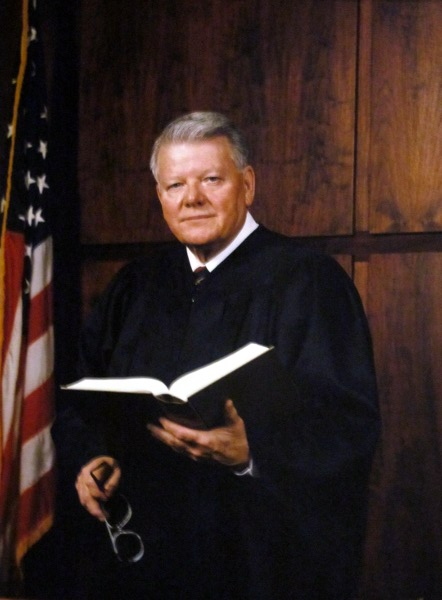

Judge of the United States District Court for the Eastern District of Louisiana
- In office September 26, 1979 – April 6, 1993
- Appointed by: Jimmy Carter
- Preceded by: Seat established by 92 Stat. 1629
- Succeeded by: Stanwood Duval

Personal details
- Born: George Arceneaux Jr. May 17, 1928 New Orleans, Louisiana
- Died: April 6, 1993 (aged 64) Houma, Louisiana
- Party: Democratic
- Education: Louisiana State University (BA); Washington College of Law (JD)

George Arceneaux Jr. (May 17, 1928 – April 6, 1993) was a United States district judge of the United States District Court for the Eastern District of Louisiana.

== Education and career ==
Born in New Orleans, Louisiana, Arceneaux received a Bachelor of Arts degree from Louisiana State University in 1949. He received a Juris Doctor from the Washington College of Law at American University in 1957. He was in the United States Army from 1951 to 1952. He was an administrative assistant to United States Senator Allen J. Ellender from 1952 to 1960. He was in private practice of law in Houma, Louisiana from 1960 to 1979.

== Federal judicial service ==
Arceneaux was nominated by President Jimmy Carter on June 12, 1979, to the United States District Court for the Eastern District of Louisiana, to a new seat created by 92 Stat. 1629. He was confirmed by the United States Senate on September 25, 1979, and received his commission on September 26, 1979. His service was terminated on April 6, 1993, due to his death in Houma.

== Notable case ==
In 1991, Arceneaux delivered the maximum sentence allowed on the conviction for multiple felonies of former Louisiana Insurance Commissioner Douglas D. "Doug" Green of Baton Rouge. Judge Arceneaux ordered Green to serve twenty-eight concurrent five-year terms on conviction of conspiracy and mail fraud and two concurrent 20-year terms for laundering campaign loans. A jury determined that Green conspired with John and Naaman Eicher of the Champion Insurance Company, his largest campaign donors, to keep the failing company intact, a decision which cost Louisiana taxpayers $150 million. According to prosecution evidence, Green received $2.7 million in bribes. Green ultimately served about half of his total 25-year sentence in the federal prison in Pensacola, Florida.

== Sources ==
Legal offices
Preceded by Seat established by 92 Stat. 1629	Judge of the United States District Court for the Eastern District of Louisiana; 1979–1994	Succeeded by Stanwood Duval
