= Vivek Agarwal =

Indian cricketer (1962–1993)

Personal information
- Born: 3 January 1962
- Died: 26 April 1993 (aged 31)

Vivek Agarwal (3 January 1962 – 26 April 1993) was an Indian cricketer. He was a right-handed batsman who played for Haryana. He was born in Meerut (Uttar Pradesh).

Agarwal made a single first-class appearance for the side, during the 1982–83 season, against Bengal. From the opening order, he scored 18 runs in the first innings in which he batted, and a duck in the second.

He worked as a flight purser for Indian Airlines and was on board Flight 491 which crashed on 26 April 1993, after take-off from Aurangabad. He was one of 55 people who died in the accident.
