= Niels Rohweder =

Danish architect

- Born: 15 March 1906; Svendborg, Denmark
- Died: 21 April 1993 (aged 87); Copenhagen, Denmark
- Occupation: Architect

Niels Rohweder (15 March 1906 – 21 April 1993) was a Danish architect. His work was part of the architecture event in the art competition at the 1932 Summer Olympics.
