= Numba Mwila =

Zambian footballer (1972-1993)

Personal information
- Full name: Numba Mwila
- Date of birth: 18 March 1972
- Place of birth: Mufulira, Zambia
- Date of death: 27 April 1993 (aged 21)
- Place of death: Atlantic Ocean, off Gabon
- Position: Midfielder

Senior career*
Years	Team	Apps	(Gls)
1992–1993	Nkana		

International career
1991–1993	Zambia	4	(1)
- * Club domestic league appearances and goals

Numba Mwila (18 March 1972 – 27 April 1993) was a Zambian footballer and member of the national team. He was among those killed in the crash of the team plane in Gabon in 1993.

== Career ==
Mwila played club football for Nkana F.C. in Zambia. He played for Zambia between 1991 and 1993.

== Personal life ==
His two brothers Mukuka and Mumamba also played international football for Zambia.

== Career statistics ==
=== International ===
As of match played 25 April 1993.

Appearances and goals by national team and year
National team	Year	Apps	Goals
Zambia	1991	1	0
Zambia	1992	0	0
Zambia	1993	3	1
Total		4	1

Scores and results list Zambia's goal tally first, score column indicates score after each Mwila goal.

List of international goals scored by Numba Mwila
No.	Date	Venue	Cap	Opponent	Score	Result	Competition	Ref.
1.	16 January 1993	CCM Kirumba Stadium, Mwanza, Tanzania	2	Tanzania	2–0	3–1	1994 FIFA World Cup qualification	
