= Moses Chikwalakwala =

Zambian footballer (1969–1993)

Personal information
- Full name: Moses Chikwalakwala
- Date of birth: 28 August 1969
- Place of birth: Mufulira, Zambia
- Date of death: 27 April 1993 (aged 23)
- Place of death: Atlantic Ocean, off Gabon
- Position: Right winger

Senior career*
Years	Team	Apps	(Gls)
1991–1992	Chambishi		
1993	Nkana		

International career
1992–1993	Zambia	7	(3)
- * Club domestic league appearances and goals

Moses Chikwalakwala (28 August 1969 – 27 April 1993) was a Zambian footballer and member of the national team. He was among those killed in the crash of the team plane in Gabon in 1993.

== Club career ==
He played for Chambishi in 1991 and 1992 before leaving to join Nkana in 1993.

== International career ==
He debuted for Zambia during a 2–0 win against Tanzania during 1994 FIFA World Cup qualifying on 11 October 1992. He also represented Zambia at the 1992 CECAFA Cup.

== Career statistics ==
=== International ===
As of match played 25 April 1993.

Appearances and goals by national team and year
National team	Year	Apps	Goals
Zambia	1992	4	3
Zambia	1993	3	0
Total		7	3

Scores and results list Zambia's goal tally first, score column indicates score after each Chikwalakwala goal.

List of international goals scored by Moses Chikwalakwala
No.	Date	Venue	Cap	Opponent	Score	Result	Competition	Ref.
1.	25 October 1992	Independence Stadium, Windhoek, Namibia	2	Namibia	1–0	4–0	1994 FIFA World Cup qualification	
2.	25 October 1992	Independence Stadium, Windhoek, Namibia	2	Namibia	4–0	4–0	1994 FIFA World Cup qualification	
3.	17 November 1992	CCM Kirumba Stadium, Mwanza, Tanzania	3	Ethiopia	1–0	3–2	1992 CECAFA Cup	
