= 1993 Zambia national football team plane crash =

Zambian Air Force plane crash off the coast of Gabon

Zambian Air Force AF-319
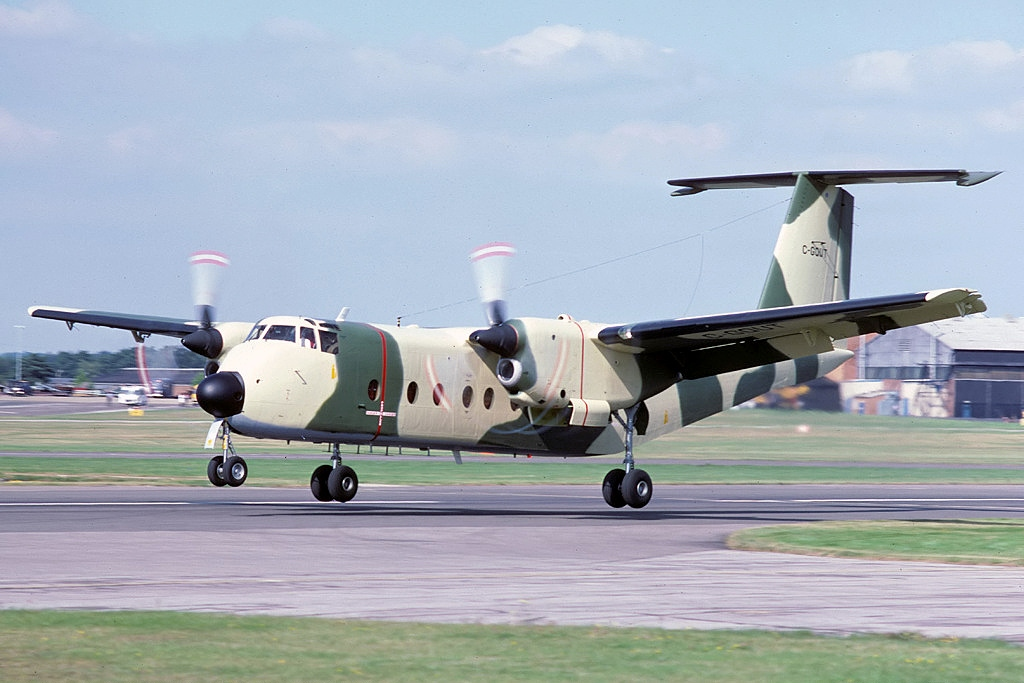
- A DHC-5D Buffalo similar to the accident aircraft

Accident
- Date: 27 April 1993
- Summary: Crashed after shut down of operational engine
- Site: Atlantic Ocean off Gabon; 0°37′05″N 9°18′46″E

Aircraft
- Aircraft type: de Havilland Canada DHC-5D Buffalo
- Operator: Zambian Air Force
- Registration: AF-319
- Flight origin: Lusaka, Zambia
- 1st stopover: Brazzaville, Republic of the Congo
- 2nd stopover: Libreville, Gabon
- Last stopover: Abidjan, Ivory Coast
- Destination: Dakar, Senegal
- Occupants: 30
- Passengers: 25
- Crew: 5
- Fatalities: 30
- Survivors: 0

On the evening of 27 April 1993, a de Havilland Canada DHC-5 Buffalo transport aircraft of the Zambian Air Force crashed into the Atlantic Ocean shortly after taking off from Libreville, Gabon. The flight was carrying most of the Zambia national football team to a 1994 FIFA World Cup Qualifier against Senegal in Dakar. All 25 passengers and five crew members were killed. The official investigation concluded that the pilot had shut down the wrong engine following an engine fire. It also found that pilot fatigue and a faulty instrument had contributed to the accident.

== Accident ==
The flight had been specially arranged by the Zambian Air Force for the football team. The journey was scheduled to make three refuelling stops; the first at Brazzaville, Congo, the second at Libreville, Gabon, and the third at Abidjan, Ivory Coast.

Flight route

At the first stop in Brazzaville engine problems were noted. Despite this, the flight continued and a few minutes after taking off from the second stop in Libreville the left engine caught fire and failed. The pilot, who had also flown the team from a match in Mauritius the previous day, then mistakenly shut down the right engine, causing the plane to lose all power during the climb out of Libreville Airport and fall into the water 500 metres (1,600 ft; 550 yd) offshore. A Gabonese report released in 2003 attributed the pilot's actions to a faulty warning light and fatigue.

== Aircraft ==
The aircraft entered service in 1975. The plane had been out of service for five months from late 1992 until 21 April 1993. Test flights were carried out on 22 and 26 April. Prior to the departure for Senegal, checks revealed defects in the engine: carbon particles in oil filters, disconnected cables and trace of heating. However, the flight went ahead as scheduled.

== Passengers ==
The Chipolopolo were the Zambia national team. At the 1988 Olympic Games in Seoul, their 4–0 victory over Italy included a hat-trick from Kalusha Bwalya, who won the African Footballer of the Year later that year. They aimed to win the 1994 Africa Cup of Nations trophy, having finished third in the 1990 edition, and to qualify for their first World Cup.

All 30 passengers and crew, including 18 players, as well as the national team coach and support staff, died in the accident.

Three players of the "Chipolopolo" were playing with UEFA clubs, and each made separate travel plans from their clubs in Europe to Senegal. Captain Kalusha Bwalya— later national team coach and president of the FAZ — was playing for PSV Eindhoven. Charles Musonda, a player for Anderlecht, was previously injured, staying in Belgium for rehabilitation at the time. Johnson Bwalya played for FC Bulle, and would have traveled from Switzerland. Bennett Mulwanda Simfukwe, who had been seconded to the FAZ by his employers (ZCCM) for 5 years and was supposed to be on this flight, wasn't on it because his employers demanded that he should immediately be removed from the list of those who were officially scheduled to travel to Senegal. Andrew Tembo and Martin Mumba almost boarded the flight, however they were asked not to board at the last minute.

== Investigation ==
A campaign to have the Gabonese crash investigation publicly released continued into the 2000s. In November 2003 a preliminary crash investigation report was released by the Gabonese government, which claimed that the left engine had caught on fire, and in an attempt to control the fire the pilot thought he had shut down that engine, when in reality he shut down the right engine due to a faulty warning light. Despite this, relatives of the victims continue to lobby the Zambian government to produce a report on how the aircraft was allowed to leave Zambia, and why the players were transported on a military plane.

In May 2002, $4 million was given to families of the deceased players in compensation.

== Aftermath ==
A week long period of mourning was declared by the government after the crash.

The members of the national team killed in the crash were buried in what became known as "Heroes' Acre", just outside the Independence Stadium in Lusaka.

A new side was quickly assembled, and led by Kalusha Bwalya, faced up to the difficult task of having to complete Zambia's World Cup qualifiers (narrowly missing qualification by finishing one point behind Morocco) and then prepare for the upcoming African Nations Cup which was only months away to be hosted in Tunisia.

The resurrected team defied the odds, and displaying an attacking playing style, reached the 1994 African Cup of Nations final against Nigeria. They took the lead in the first half, but the Super Eagles quickly equalised and followed up with the winner in the second half. In spite of the loss, the Zambian side returned home as national heroes.

In 2012, Zambia won the Africa Cup of Nations in Libreville, only a few hundred metres inland from the crash site; the victory was dedicated to the ones who lost their lives in the tragedy. Zambia beat Côte d'Ivoire 8–7 in a penalty shoot out after the game ended 0–0 after normal and added time.

The accident was the subject of the 2015 Spanish–Zambian documentary film Eighteam, directed by Juan Rodriguez-Briso.

== Victims ==
All thirty people on board died in the crash. 24 bodies were recovered, but only 13 could be identified.

=== Crew ===
- Colonel Fenton Mhone (pilot)
- Lt Colonel Victor Mubanga (pilot)
- Lt Colonel James Sachika (pilot)
- Major Edward Nhamboteh (flight engineer)
- Corporal Thomas Sakala

=== Coaching staff ===
- Godfrey "Ucar" Chitalu (coach)
- Alex Chola (assistant coach)

=== Footballers ===
No.	Pos.	Player	Date of birth (age)	Caps	Goals	Club
	GK	David Chabala	2 February 1960 (aged 33)	115	0	(Football Association of Zambia) Mufulira Wanderers
	GK	Richard Mwanza	5 May 1959 (aged 33)	8	0	(Football Association of Zambia) Kabwe Warriors
	DF	Whiteson Changwe	19 October 1964 (aged 28)	31	1	(Football Association of Zambia) Kabwe Warriors
	DF	John Soko	5 May 1968 (aged 24)	25	0	(Football Association of Zambia) Nkana
	DF	Samuel Chomba	5 January 1964 (aged 29)	21	2	(South African Football Association) Dynamos
	DF	Robert Watiyakeni	18 October 1969 (aged 23)	4	0	(South African Football Association) Dynamos
	DF	Winter Mumba	unknown	2	0	(Football Association of Zambia) Power Dynamos
	DF	Kenan Simambe	23 August 1974 (aged 18)	1	1	(Football Association of Zambia) Power Dynamos
	MF	Derby Makinka	5 September 1965 (aged 27)	98	10	(Saudi Arabian Football Federation) Al-Ettifaq
	MF	Wisdom Mumba Chansa	17 April 1964 (aged 29)	34	4	(South African Football Association) Dynamos
	MF	Eston Mulenga	7 August 1961 (aged 31)	34	1	(Football Association of Zambia) Nkana
	MF	Moses Chikwalakwala	28 August 1969 (aged 23)	7	3	(Football Association of Zambia) Nkana
	MF	Numba Mwila	18 March 1972 (aged 21)	4	1	(Football Association of Zambia) Nkana
	MF	Godfrey Kangwa	unknown	1	0	(Royal Moroccan Football Federation) Olympique de Casablanca
	FW	Timothy Mwitwa	21 May 1968 (aged 24)	16	2	(Football Association of Zambia) Nkana
	FW	Kelvin Mutale	20 September 1969 (aged 23)	10	12	(Saudi Arabian Football Federation) Al-Ettifaq
	FW	Patrick Banda	28 January 1974 (aged 19)	6	3	(Football Association of Zambia) Profund Warriors
	FW	Moses Masuwa	30 July 1971 (aged 21)	1	0	(Football Association of Zambia) Kabwe Warriors

== See also ==
- List of accidents involving sports teams
