= Konrad Srzednicki =

Polish painter

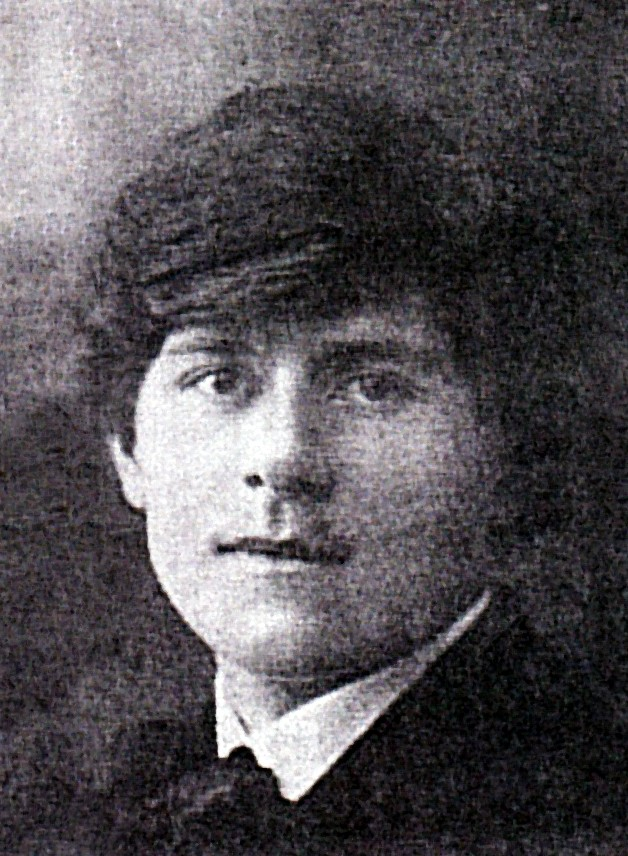
- Born: 1 November 1894; Wysokie Mazowieckie, Poland
- Died: 8 April 1993 (aged 98); Kraków, Poland
- Occupations: Painter; Printmaker

Konrad Srzednicki (1 November 1894 – 8 April 1993) was a Polish painter and printmaker. His work was part of the painting event in the art competition at the 1932 Summer Olympics.
