= Kalusha Bwalya =

Zambian footballer (born 1963)

President of Football Association of Zambia (FAZ)
- In office 2008–2016
- Preceded by: Teddy Mulonga
- Succeeded by: Andrew Kamanga

Personal details
- Born: 16 August 1963 (age 63) Mufulira, Northern Rhodesia
- Occupation: Footballer (retired); Football administrator
Association football career
- Positions: Forward; winger
Senior career*
Years	Team	Apps	(Gls)
1979–1980	Mufulira Blackpool		
1980–1985	Mufulira	32+	(22+)
1985–1989	Cercle Brugge	95	(30)
1989–1994	PSV Eindhoven	101	(25)
1994–1997	América	88	(21)
1997	Necaxa	17	(1)
1998	Al Wahda		
1998	León	13	(1)
1999	Irapuato	28	(9)
1999	Veracruz	18	(6)
2000	Correcaminos	13	(5)
International career
1983–2004	Zambia	87	(39)
Managerial career
- 2003–2006: Zambia
- * Club domestic league appearances and goals

Kalusha Bwalya (born 16 August 1963) is a Zambian former professional footballer. He is third on the list of all-time top goalscorers behind Godfrey Chitalu and Alex Chola. Kalusha was named African Footballer of the Year in 1988 by the magazine France Football and was nominated for the 1996 FIFA World Player of the Year where he was voted the 12th-best player in the world, the first to be nominated after playing the entire year for a non-European club.

His older brother Benjamin Bwalya played professional football, and his younger brother Joel Bwalya also played for Zambia. His cousin is former Cardiff City and Welsh national team member Robert Earnshaw.

His career as a player, coach and president of the Football Association of Zambia is partly shown in the documentary film "Eighteam".

On 20 March 2016, Kalusha lost the Football Association of Zambia (FAZ) elections in an upset to businessman-turned football official Andrew Kamanga by 163 to 156 votes.

In August 2018, the world football governing body FIFA banned Bwalya for a year from all football-related activities at both national and international level. The FIFA adjudicatory chamber of the independent Ethics Committee alleged he violated article 16 (Confidentiality) and article 20 (Offering and accepting gifts and other benefits) of the FIFA Code of Ethics. It is alleged that Bwalya received a bribe in the form of a gift from Mohammed Bin Hammam, a Qatari official. However, he was later cleared and found not guilty of any violation.

Kalusha is considered one of the greatest players in Zambian football history.

== Club career ==
Bwalya's career in Europe began at Cercle Brugge in Belgium. In his first season, he was the club's top scorer and was twice voted supporters' player of the year. Such was his impact that Dutch giants PSV Eindhoven took him to the Eredivisie, and he describes winning the championship twice in 1990/91 and 1991/92, under Bobby Robson, as a career highlight.

He jokingly adds that: "Most of the time we played in the opponents half, because the team was so good. You know, we had Romario, Gerald Vanenburg, Eric Gerets, Wim Kieft and Hans van Breukelen and just to be with that group, to train with them day in, day out, was an experience."

Bwalya's next stop was Club America, to whom he moved in 1994. The Mexican club's home ground is the legendary Azteca, an arena of which the Zambian icon has very fond memories. As he told FIFA.com: "I am privileged to have played in the best stadium in the world – and to have been able to call it my home ground." The Mexico experience in general was cherished by Bwalya, who devoted almost eight years of his career to the country and recalls his time there as "probably the best of my life". Despite his good performances at América and gaining a status of a fan favorite, Kalusha is also remembered for missing an empty net goal by striking the post against Cruz Azul.

On the international front, his earliest achievement was arguably one of the most remarkable hat-tricks in modern football history, with three-times World Cup champions Italy on the receiving end in a 4–0 win for the Zambians at the 1988 Olympics. Bwalya acknowledges that the result was a surprise, but adds: "Zambia is a sleeping giant in a way. It is a small country in terms of football, but we were the first African team to beat a European power as convincingly as that."

== International career ==
Bwalya was a member of the national squad that participated at the 1988 Olympic Games, making his mark with a famous hat-trick in a 4–0 victory against Italy. At the full international level, he appeared in 87 international matches and scored 39 goals from 1983 to 2004. He debuted against Sudan in April 1983 at Dag Hammarskjoeld Stadium in a Cup of Nations qualifier in Ndola, and scored his first goal against Uganda in a World Cup qualifier the following year at the same venue. He has appeared in multiple tournaments, including six editions of the African Cup of Nations.

Although he was captain of the national football team during the qualification matches for the 1994 World Cup, Kalusha was not on the ill-fated flight on 28 April 1993 when the entire team and its management were killed when the plane crashed into the Atlantic Ocean off Gabon. As he was playing for PSV Eindhoven, his schedule had him flying from the Netherlands to Senegal to join the team instead of being on the team plane. Kalusha took on the mantle of spearheading the revival of the national side the following year, captaining the side to the Runners-Up spot at the CAF African Nations Cup 1994 in Tunisia—where they succumbed to the Nigeria national team; this was to be the peak of his own career and Zambian football for a long time to come. The national team finished in 3rd place at the next edition of the Africa Cup in South Africa in 1996, with Kalusha winning the Golden Boot Award as the top scorer at the tournament.

He was a player-coach during the African 2006 World Cup qualification matches. On 5 September 2004, Kalusha came off the bench during the second half against Liberia to score from a trademark direct free kick to give Zambia a 1–0 victory and the lead of Africa's Group 1. In doing so at the age of 41 years and 19 days, he became the third-oldest international goalscorer in world football, only behind England's Stanley Matthews in 1956 (41y and 248d) and Cameroon's Roger Milla in 1994, aged 42. However, Zambia finished third and failed to qualify for the 2006 World Cup.

== Coaching and administrative career ==
Bwalya coached Zambia at the 2006 African Cup of Nations. Following their elimination in the first round, Bwalya resigned from his post. He then contributed to the 2006 World Cup as a member of FIFA’s Technical Study Group and later served as one of the ambassadors for the 2010 World Cup held in South Africa. Bwalya continued serving as vice president of the Football Association of Zambia until 2008, when he was elected president following strong pressure and support from FAZ members and the media. On 23 February 2008, he was elected to the CAF Executive Committee.

Bwalya served as a standing committee member of both FIFA and the Confederation of African Football. He was president of the Football Association of Zambia (FAZ) from 2008 to 2016, having previously served as vice president. In 2016, he unsuccessfully sought a third term as FAZ president, losing the election to Andrew Kamanga at the FAZ Annual General Meeting.

Bwalya's long-held ambition of winning the Africa Cup of Nations was realized in the 2012 Africa Cup of Nations, when the Zambia national team defeated the heavily favored Ivory Coast in the final. As president of the Football Association of Zambia, he joined the players in lifting the trophy in Gabon, the same country where members of the national team perished in the 1993 air disaster. This emotional journey is documented in the film Eighteam, directed by Juan Rodriguez-Briso.

== Career statistics ==
=== International goals ===
Scores and results list Zambia's goal tally first, score column indicates score after each Bwalya goal.

List of international goals scored by Kalusha Bwalya
No.	Date	Venue	Opponent	Score	Result	Competition	Ref.
1	29 July 1984	Ndola, Zambia	Uganda	3–0	3–0	1986 FIFA World Cup qualification	
2	8 March 1986	Alexandria Stadium, Alexandria, Egypt	Cameroon	2–2	2–3	1986 Africa Cup of Nations	
3	5 April 1987	Lusaka, Zambia	Malawi	–	3–1	1987 All-Africa Games	
4	17 January 1988	Independence Stadium, Lusaka, Zambia	Ghana	–	2–0	1988 Summer Olympics qualification	
5	17 September 1988	Daejeon Hanbat Sports Complex, Daejeon, South Korea	Iraq	2–1	2–2	1988 Summer Olympics	
6	19 September 1988	Gwangju Mudeung Stadium, Gwangju, South Korea	Italy	1–0	4–0	1988 Summer Olympics	
7	19 September 1988	Gwangju Mudeung Stadium, Gwangju, South Korea	Italy	2–0	4–0	1988 Summer Olympics	
8	19 September 1988	Gwangju Mudeung Stadium, Gwangju, South Korea	Italy	4–0	4–0	1988 Summer Olympics	
9	21 September 1988	Gwangju Mudeung Stadium, Gwangju, South Korea	Guatemala	2–0	4–0	1988 Summer Olympics	
10	21 September 1988	Gwangju Mudeung Stadium, Gwangju, South Korea	Guatemala	3–0	4–0	1988 Summer Olympics	
11	22 January 1989	Independence Stadium, Lusaka, Zambia	Zaire	4–1	4–2	1990 FIFA World Cup qualification	
12	25 June 1989	Independence Stadium, Lusaka, Zambia	Morocco	2–1	2–1	1990 FIFA World Cup qualification	
13	14 April 1991	Estádio da Cidadela, Luanda, Angola	Angola	1–0	2–1	1992 Africa Cup of Nations qualification	
14	14 July 1991	Independence Stadium, Lusaka, Zambia	Madagascar	2–0	2–1	1992 Africa Cup of Nations qualification	
15	13 January 1992	Stade Aline Sitoe Diatta, Ziguinchor, Senegal	Egypt	1–0	1–0	1992 Africa Cup of Nations	
16	16 January 1993	CCM Kirumba Stadium, Mwanza, Tanzania	Tanzania	1–0	3–1	1994 FIFA World Cup qualification	
17	30 January 1993	Independence Stadium, Lusaka, Zambia	Namibia	3–0	4–0	1994 FIFA World Cup qualification	
18	28 February 1993	Independence Stadium, Lusaka, Zambia	Madagascar	2–0	3–1	1994 FIFA World Cup qualification	
19	4 July 1993	Independence Stadium, Lusaka, Zambia	Morocco	1–1	2–1	1994 FIFA World Cup qualification	
20	11 July 1993	Independence Stadium, Lusaka, Zambia	South Africa	2–0	3–0	1994 Africa Cup of Nations qualification	
21	25 July 1993	National Sports Stadium, Harare, Zimbabwe	Zimbabwe	1–1	1–1	1994 Africa Cup of Nations qualification	
22	26 September 1993	Independence Stadium, Lusaka, Zambia	Senegal	4–0	4–0	1994 Africa Cup of Nations qualification	
23	6 April 1994	El Menzah Stadium, Tunis, Tunisia	Mali	3–0	4–0	1994 Africa Cup of Nations	
24	9 January 1995	Stade George V, Curepipe, Mauritius	Mauritius	1–0	3–0	1996 Africa Cup of Nations qualification	
25	9 January 1995	Stade George V, Curepipe, Mauritius	Mauritius	3–0	3–0	1996 Africa Cup of Nations qualification	
26	8 April 1995	Independence Stadium, Lusaka, Zambia	Gabon	1–0	1–0	1996 Africa Cup of Nations qualification	
27	20 January 1996	Free State Stadium, Bloemfontein, South Africa	Burkina Faso	2–0	5–1	1996 Africa Cup of Nations	
28	20 January 1996	Free State Stadium, Bloemfontein, South Africa	Burkina Faso	3–0	5–1	1996 Africa Cup of Nations	
29	24 January 1996	Free State Stadium, Bloemfontein, South Africa	Sierra Leone	1–0	4–0	1996 Africa Cup of Nations	
30	24 January 1996	Free State Stadium, Bloemfontein, South Africa	Sierra Leone	2–0	4–0	1996 Africa Cup of Nations	
31	24 January 1996	Free State Stadium, Bloemfontein, South Africa	Sierra Leone	3–0	4–0	1996 Africa Cup of Nations	
32	17 February 1998	Stade Général Aboubacar Sangoulé Lamizana, Bobo-Dioulasso, Burkina Faso	Mozambique	2–0	3–1	1998 Africa Cup of Nations	
33	1 February 2000	Lagos National Stadium, Lagos, Nigeria	Senegal	2–2	2–2	2000 Africa Cup of Nations	
34	31 July 2004	Independence Stadium, Lusaka, Zambia	Mauritius	3–1	3–1	2004 COSAFA Cup	
35	4 September 2004	Independence Stadium, Lusaka, Zambia	Liberia	1–0	1–0	2006 FIFA World Cup qualification	

== Honours ==
Mufulira Wanderers

- Zambian Challenge Cup: 1984

PSV

- Eredivisie: 1990–91, 1991–92
- KNVB Cup: 1989–90
- Dutch Supercup: 1992

Individual

- Pop Poll d'Echte Cercle Brugge K.S.V. Player of the Year: 1986–87, 1987–88
- African Footballer of the Year: 1988
- Africa Cup of Nations Team of the Tournament: 1986, 1996
- Africa Cup of Nations Top Scorer: 1996
