= Robert Watiyakeni =

Zambian footballer (1969–1993)

Personal information
- Date of birth: 18 October 1969
- Place of birth: Chingola, Zambia
- Date of death: 27 April 1993 (aged 23)
- Place of death: Atlantic Ocean, off Gabon
- Position: Defender

Senior career*
Years	Team	Apps	(Gls)
1989–1990	Nchanga Rangers		
1991–1992	Power Dynamos		
1993	Dynamos		

International career
1992–1993	Zambia	4	(0)
- * Club domestic league appearances and goals

Robert Watiyakeni (18 October 1969 – 27 April 1993) was a Zambian footballer and member of the national team. He was among those killed in the crash of the team plane in Gabon in 1993.

== Career ==
A centre-back, Watiyakeni played professional club football in South Africa for Dynamos.

Watiyakeni made several appearances for the Zambia national team and participated in the 1992 African Cup of Nations finals.
