= Troy Dandridge =

American baseball player

- Shortstop
- Born: April 22, 1904; Lucy, Tennessee
- Died: April 12, 1993 (aged 88); Los Angeles, California
- Threw: Right

Negro league baseball debut
- 1926, for the Dayton Marcos

Last appearance
- 1926, for the Dayton Marcos
- Stats at Baseball Reference

Teams
- Dayton Marcos (1926)

Troy Rassmussen Dandridge (April 22, 1904 – April 12, 1993) was an American Negro league shortstop in the 1920s.

A native of Lucy, Tennessee, Dandridge played for the Dayton Marcos in 1926. He died in Los Angeles, California in 1993 at age 88.
