= Emil Synek =

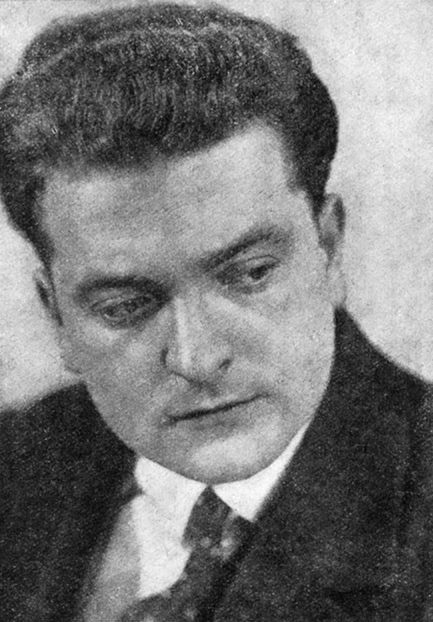
Synek in 1931

Emil Synek (7 September 1903 – 12 April 1993) was a Czech playwright, novelist, biographer, journalist and film director. He won two national literary prizes in Czechoslovakia before relocating to France in 1948. He lived in Paris for the rest of his life, dying there in 1993.

== Life and career ==
Synek was born on 7 September 1903 in Prague. He earned degrees from the Sorbonne in Paris and Charles University in Prague. His first wife was the actress Emilie Budlová. The author of more than 20 stage works, his first play was staged at the National Theatre in Prague when he was 24 years old. He also penned novels and biographies, and won a national literary prize in Czechoslovakia in 1934. He also worked as a film director for Barrandov Studios.

Synek was vocally opposed to Nazi Germany during World War II. He worked as a political journalist before fleeing Prague to France during the war and fought in that country as a member of the Czech militia. He was evacuated to Dunkirk and then London; serving in the Czechoslovak government-in-exile. After the war he returned to Czechoslovakia for a brief period during which time he won a second national literary prize for his novel The Running Shadow. Fearful of a communist regime coming to power, he left the country again for France; this time moving there with his wife and daughter. His daughter, Yveta Synek Graff, became a well known authority on Czech opera who had a long career on the staff of the Metropolitan Opera.

Synek retired in 1973 and lived in Paris until his death there on 12 April 1993 at age of 89. His second marriage was to Helena Janatkova.
