= Len Walsh =

Australian rules footballer, born 1912

Personal information
- Full name: Leonard Daniel Walsh
- Born: 24 July 1912; Kyneton, Victoria
- Died: 28 April 1993 (aged 80)
- Original team: East Malvern
- Height: 189 cm (6 ft 2 in)
- Weight: 89 kg (196 lb)

Playing career^{1}
Years	Club	Games (Goals)
1937, 1940, 1942	Hawthorn	15 (14)
- ^{1} Playing statistics correct to the end of 1942.

Leonard Daniel Walsh (24 July 1912 – 28 April 1993) was an Australian rules footballer who played with Hawthorn in the Victorian Football League (VFL).
