= Ernst von Bodelschwingh (politician) =

German politician (1906–1993)

Ernst von Bodelschwing
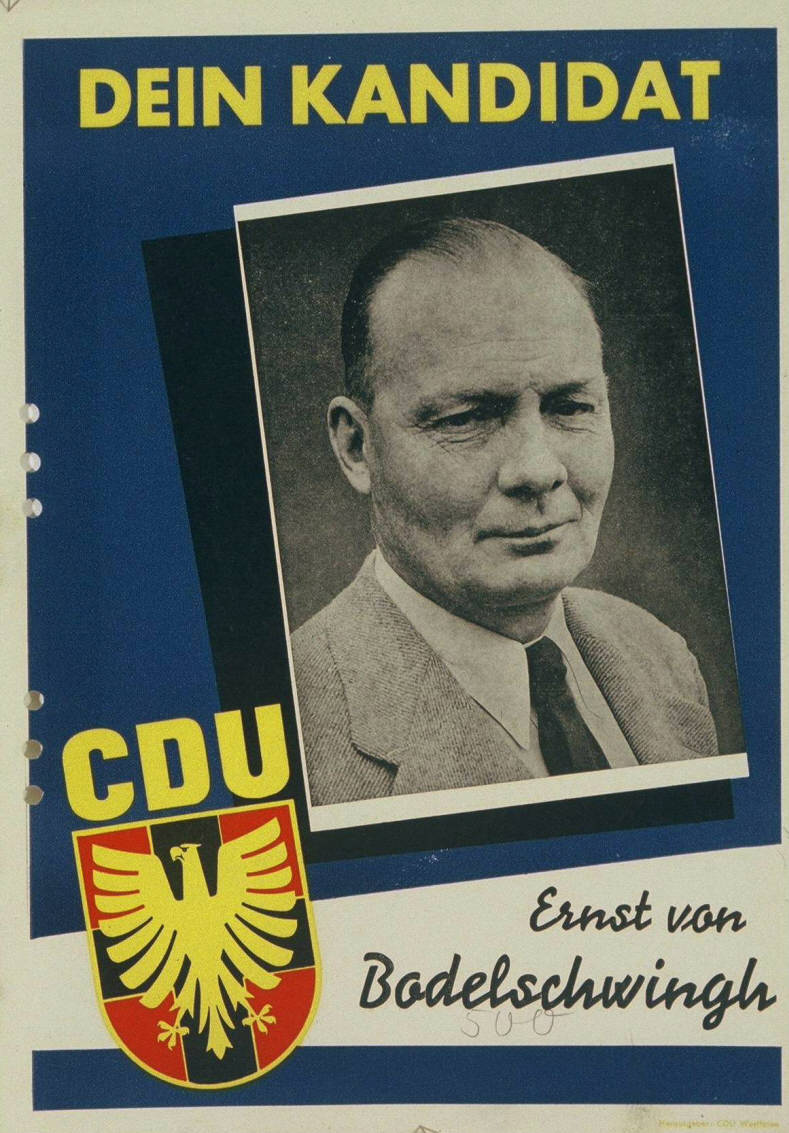
- Ernst von Bodelschwingh's candidate poster for the 1957 federal elections

Member of the Bundestag
- In office 6 October 1953 – 17 October 1965

Personal details
- Born: 8 September 1906 Bielefeld
- Died: 2 April 1993 (aged 86) Bielefeld, North Rhine-Westphalia, Germany
- Party: CDU

Ernst von Bodelschwingh (September 8, 1906 – April 2, 1993) was a German politician of the Christian Democratic Union (CDU) and former member of the German Bundestag.

== Life ==
Bodelschwingh joined the CDU in 1948. Bodelschwingh was a member of the Weddinghofen municipal council and the district council in the district of Unna. He was a member of the German Bundestag from 1953 to 1965, representing the constituency of Unna - Hamm.

== Literature ==
Herbst, Ludolf; Jahn, Bruno (2002). Vierhaus, Rudolf (ed.). Biographisches Handbuch der Mitglieder des Deutschen Bundestages. 1949–2002 [Biographical Handbook of the Members of the German Bundestag. 1949–2002] (in German). München: De Gruyter - De Gruyter Saur. p. 1715. ISBN 978-3-11-184511-1.
