= Indian Airlines Flight 491 =

1993 aviation accident in India

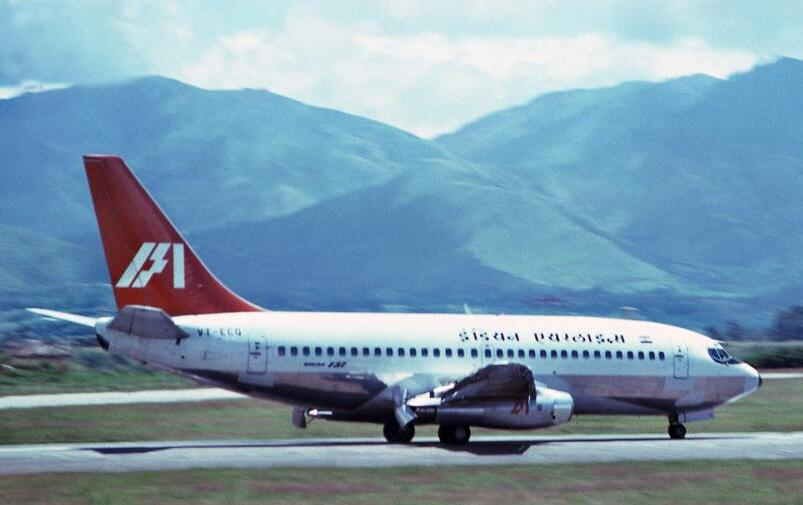
- VT-ECQ, the aircraft involved in the accident, seen in 1975

Accident
- Date: 26 April 1993
- Summary: Crashed due to delay of take-off rotation and poor technique
- Site: Near Aurangabad Airport, Aurangabad, Maharashtra, India; 19°52′30″N 75°26′19″E

Aircraft
- Aircraft type: Boeing 737-2A8
- Operator: Indian Airlines
- IATA flight No.: IC491
- ICAO flight No.: IAC491
- Call sign: INDAIR 491
- Registration: VT-ECQ
- Flight origin: Indira Gandhi International Airport, Delhi, India
- 1st stopover: Jaipur International Airport, Jaipur, Rajasthan, India
- 2nd stopover: Maharana Pratap Airport. Udaipur, Rajasthan, India
- Last stopover: Aurangabad Airport, Aurangabad, Maharashtra, India
- Destination: Sahar Airport, Bombay, Maharashtra, India
- Occupants: 118
- Passengers: 112
- Crew: 6
- Fatalities: 55
- Injuries: 19
- Survivors: 63

Indian Airlines Flight 491 was a scheduled domestic passenger flight from Aurangabad to Mumbai, operated by India's Flag carrier Indian Airlines. On 26 April 1993, the aircraft operating the flight, a Boeing 737-200 with a registration of VT-ECQ crashed shortly after take-off following the aircraft's impact with a Truck and a high tension power line. The crash killed 55 people and injured 63 others.

A formal investigation was launched by Ministry of Civil Aviation (India). The final report concluded that the crash was caused by the captain's false perception on take-off technique which ultimately led to the aircraft's impact with a lorry at the end of the runway. Subsequently, the report also blamed authorities for not regulating public vehicles near the airport's vicinity.

== Aircraft ==
The aircraft was an 18-year-old Boeing 737-2A8, manufactured with a serial manufacturer number of 20961. The aircraft was delivered to Indian Airlines in 1974 and was registered as VT-ECQ. It was configured with a sitting capacity of 126 passengers. The aircraft had accumulated a total of 43,887 flight hours and a total flight cycle of more than 50,000 cycles. It was equipped with 2 Pratt & Whitney Canada JT8D-9A with a total engine cycle of 34,238 cycles.

== Passengers and crews ==
Flight 491 was carrying 112 passengers. Most of the passengers were Indians. According to the spokesperson of Indian Airlines, Ashok Sharma, there were at least 10 westerners aboard the aircraft. It was confirmed that there were at least one Australian, one British, one German and one Japanese citizen on board the flight.

The flight had originated from India's capital of Delhi and would have ended in Bombay with stopovers in multiple cities in Rajasthan and Maharashtra. The route is described as a popular route for tourists as the stopover cities are known for its historic palaces while Mumbai is the economic capital of India.

There were 6 crew members on board, consisted of 2 flight crew and 4 cabin crew. The flight crew was consisted of Captain S.N Singh (38) and First Officer Manisha Mohan (30) while the cabin crew was consisted of Nim (33), Anita Dabas (27), Raman Yadav (31) and Vivek (31).

Captain Singh (38) was the pilot of Flight 491. He obtained his Boeing 737 flying license in 1986 as a co-pilot. His first command training for a Boeing 737 was in 1991. He was subsequently declared as fit to fly as a Captain of a Boeing 737 in 1992. As of March 1993. he had accrued a total flying experience of 4,963 hours, of which 1,720 hours were on the type.

First Officer Manisha Mohan (30) was the co-pilot of Captain Singh in the flight. She started training in Hyderabad's Central Training Establishment (CTE) in 1989 and obtained a Boeing 737 license on the same year. As of March 1993, she had accrued a total flying experience of 1,172 hours, of which 921 hours were on the type.

== Accident ==
Flight 491 was a domestic passenger flight from Aurangabad, a major town in Maharashtra known for its temples, and Mumbai, the economic centre of India. The flight had originated from the nation's capital of New Delhi. The crew was consisted of Captain Singh (38) and First Officer Mohan (30).

At Aurangabad, 18 passengers disembarked and 51 passengers boarded the aircraft, raising the total number of passengers to 112. The aircraft was refueled and the crew asked for start up clearance. Aurangabad controller cleared the crew to use Runway 09 for take-off. The aircraft taxied onto the apron and turned towards the beginning of the runway. The crew then initiated the take-off roll.

The aircraft didn't lift off until near the end of the 6,000-foot (1,800 m) runway at around 13:00 local time. A lorry carrying loads of cotton bales was being driven at a road near the runway end and the aircraft's left main landing gear and left engine collided with the lorry. The impact severed both the left main landing gear and the left engine's thrust reverser. The truck's cotton bales were strewn across a nearby field due to the collision. As the aircraft lifted off from the runway, the severed left landing gear and thrust reverser detached and collided with parts of the leading edge of the left horizontal stabilizer and left elevator, damaging both structures. Approximately 98 inches (2.5 m) of the outer portion of the aircraft's left horizontal stabilizer then detached, followed by a 115-inch (2.9 m) left elevator surface. The impact with the truck and the separation of the left thrust reverser caused the left engine to rotate at a low RPM.

Banking to the left, the aircraft then flew onto a set of three high tension electric wires, about three kilometres (1.9 mi) from the airport, and snapped all three wires. 500 metres (1,600 ft; 550 yd) from its collision with the wires, the aircraft descended and struck two babool trees. The impact uprooted both trees and severed the left flaps and engine. It then slammed onto the ground with its left engine first. It continued to slide and hit another babool tree with its right wing. The collision split the fuselage into two and the aircraft burst into flames.

As the fuselage split into two sections right at the aft of the 19th cabin window, the back portion became inverted. The fire immediately reached the rear galley and rear lavatory due to the forward motion of the fuselage. The interior was completely consumed by fire. The rear fuselage then rested with its right side. Meanwhile, the front portion continued to slide for another 190 meters before it finally stopped. The flight crew evacuated through the cockpit window while the cabin crew and the passengers evacuated through the left main forward entry door. The remaining front portion was later consumed by the ensuing fire.

The crash killed 53 passengers and 2 cabin crew. A total of 11 passengers were seriously wounded and 8 others received minor injuries. The other 44 people were unharmed in the crash. A total of 63 people, including Captain Singh, First Officer Mohan, and flight attendants Nim and Anita Dabas, had survived the crash. Those who were stationed at the rear part of the aircraft, Raman Yadav and Vivek, were killed. All except one passenger on the rear fuselage had perished.

== Response ==
Indian Minister of Civil Aviation and Tourism Ghulam Nabi Azad visited the crash site along with senior officials from Indian Airlines and the Ministry. Then-Chief Minister of Maharashtra Sharad Pawar also came over from Bombay. Multiple crisis centres were set up in Delhi, Udaipur, Jaipur, Aurangabad and Bombay and families of the victims will be flown to Aurangabad.

A public hearing on the crash of Flight 491 was held in the following days. Members of Lok Sabha complained that several aircraft in India were not airworthy and that there were insufficient maintenance while another parliament member accused ground technicians in Udaipur and other "smaller airports" of being inefficient. A member of parliament also asked then-Minister of Civil Aviation and Tourism Shri Ghulam Nabi Azad to resign. Dau Dayal Joshi from Kota argued on the lack of information regarding the crash and the presence of a lorry near the runway. There was speculation that the truck was actually on the runway and not outside on the road, but was subsequently clarified in the Lok Sabha.

Compensations will be given to the relatives, with the rate of Rs.500,000 rupees for adults and Rs.2,500,000 rupees for children to the next of kin.

== Investigation ==
Indian Ministry of Civil Aviation immediately launched an inquiry into the accident. A total of 28 witnesses were interviewed and 146 documents were examined. The flight recorders were retrieved from the wreckage in burnt condition.

=== Terrorism ===
The crash occurred exactly one day after the hijacking of an Indian Airlines Boeing 737 by a Muslim extremist in Amritsar. As such, there were concerns that Flight 491 had been bombed by terrorists. The Indian Bomb Detection and Disposal Squad was requested to determine whether the aircraft had been sabotaged or not. The investigation immediately ruled out terrorism from the possible cause of the accident as there were neither traces of explosives nor evidence that a bomb explosion had occurred on board.

=== Aircraft overload ===
There were indications that the aircraft had been overloaded. Initially, the load sheet of the flight suggested that the actual take-off weight (ATOW) was 54 kg less than the regulated take-off weight (RTOW). Further investigation revealed that the aircraft had been loaded with 118 kg more than its permitted take-off weight. An overloaded state of the aircraft would have required a longer speed build up, thus explaining the late lift off of Flight 491. However, investigators could not determine the exact weight of the aircraft during takeoff and the exact extent of the overloading due to lack of clear evidence. According to the final report, investigators had to resort to reasonings and guess work.

The investigation revealed that passengers' baggage were "serially numbered but not accounted". Some passengers carried heavy hand baggage into the overhead cabin. It was estimated that the total weight of the hand baggage inside the cabin had exceeded the "calculated in built passenger weight".

Investigators estimated that the aircraft had been overloaded by 1 ton. Indian Airlines argued that the overload wouldn't have exceeded 500 kg. However, First Officer Mohan claimed that the aircraft had been overloaded by 4.65 ton, including a 500 kg overload of cargo due to a 2 degree rise in temperature during the accident.

Three flight simulations were then conducted to confirm the theory. None of the simulations resulted in a crash. The second simulation, however, suggested that Flight 491 might have crashed had the pilot initiated a late rotation, suggesting that the late rotation was directly caused by the pilot rather than the overweight condition. Further calculations concluded that even if the aircraft had been overloaded, particularly in the forward section, the centre of gravity of the aircraft would not have significantly shifted.

Aircraft overload was then ruled out from the possible causes of the crash. However, it contributed to Captain's Singh misperception, which would later cause the crash.

=== Late rotation ===
Flight 491 attained its Vr speed within 32 seconds after the crew had initiated the take-off roll, approximately at 4,100 feet (1,200 m) from the beginning of the 6,000-foot (1,800 m) runway. The cockpit voice recorder revealed that the aircraft's rotation was initiated 5–7 seconds after the rotation call. Even though the take-off roll was smooth and the acceleration was normal, the aircraft's nose started to rise approximately at a distance of 500 ft of the runway end and it still didn't manage to lift off when it ran though the 1800 ft additional distance. This could be attributed to the pilot's late rotation or a sudden freak weather condition. As it was hot and clear at the time of the accident, freak weather was immediately ruled out.

When the aircraft overran the 6,000-foot (1,800 m) runway and started to run through the 1,800 feet (550 m) additional runway distance, investigators noted that both Captain Singh and First Officer Mohan didn't react to the abnormality. In fact, Captain Singh stated that it was normal for most of his flights. Investigators later concluded that Captain Singh had adopted a similar take-off pattern in his previous flights, where the take-off was late and the climb gradient was lower than expected.

According to the interview, at the time of the accident, Captain Singh concluded that the actual take-off weight of the aircraft was exceeding its regulated take-off weight. As he thought that an overloaded condition would require a longer time to build up speed, he thought that by delaying the aircraft's rotation, taking a slow rotation or even under-rotation, the speed would eventually build up and the aircraft would acquire greater take-off speed, thus easing the climb. The runway was 6,000 feet (1,800 m) long and the decision to delay the rotation would cause the aircraft's distance to be closer with the road, leading to the collision with the lorry.

When a flight crew had called for a rotation, they should have immediately initiated the rotation. The lorry was first seen approximately six seconds after the rotation call. Had the crew initiated the rotation at an earlier stage with a normal technique, the aircraft would have lifted off approximately 4–5 seconds later and it would have achieved a height of at least 35 ft above the runway. When the rotation was initiated at a late stage and the lorry suddenly came in view, Captain Singh didn't respond for 2 seconds until he finally initiated a fast over-rotation in order to evade a collision. He claimed that he was disoriented and panicked due to the presence of the lorry. He was later noted by investigators as lacking in professionalism.

While First Officer Mohan was initially noted for her lack of response, she was later noted for being aware of an abnormality during the later stage of the take-off roll when she instantaneously grabbed the control column. Captain Singh, however, prevented her, saying "Leave it, leave it".

=== Presence of lorry ===
Adjacent to the runway was a small public road connecting north–south. Prior to the accident, around 1975 - 1985, the road was gated and the gates would be closed whenever there was an aircraft movement in the airport. Since 1986, theses gates didn't exist anymore and thus vehicles could freely use the road at any time.

Traffic regulation for roads in the vicinity of the airport was one of the responsibilities of the Indian National Airport Authority (NAA). Investigators noted that there was communication gap between NAA officials on the traffic regulation, with each officials tried to pass the buck on to the others. It was clear that the NAA at Aurangabad had failed to maintain the airport's vicinity properly.

=== Conclusion ===
The final report was published on 25 December 1993. It concluded the cause of the crash as follow:

Causes of the accident were: (i) Pilots' error in initiating late rotation and following wrong rotation technique, and (ii) failure of the NAA to regulate the mobile traffic on the Beed road during the flight hours.

Investigators issued 25 recommendations to the NAA, Aurangabad airport and Indian Airlines. In the aftermath of the crash, the road was gated again. An additional distance of 3,000 ft was added to the runway's length. Captain Singh's Captain license was revoked and his co-pilot license was suspended. Other officials who were involved or deemed as contributing to the accident were ordered to receive "departmental actions". Subsequently, the report asked the senior fire crew, Gosavi, to be awarded due to his quick response on the crash of Flight 491.

== See also ==
- List of accidents and incidents involving commercial aircraft
- Dirgantara Air Service Flight 3130, similar crash which was caused by the pilot's false perception on take-off technique
