= Godfrey Kangwa =

Zambian footballer (died 1993)

Personal information
- Full name: Godfrey Kangwa
- Place of birth: Zambia
- Date of death: 27 April 1993
- Place of death: Atlantic Ocean, off Gabon
- Position: Midfielder

Senior career*
Years	Team	Apps	(Gls)
–1993	Olympique de Casablanca		

International career
1993	Zambia	1	(0)
- * Club domestic league appearances and goals

Godfrey Kangwa (died 27 April 1993) was a Zambian footballer and member of the national team. He was among those killed in the crash of the team plane in Gabon in 1993. He was married and had 3 children.

== International career ==
Godfrey Kangwa made his debut for Zambia on 25 April 1993 during a 3–0 win against Mauritius during 1994 Africa Cup of Nations qualification; he died in a plane crash two days later.

== Career statistics ==
=== International ===
As of match played 25 April 1993.

Appearances and goals by national team and year
National team	Year	Apps	Goals
Zambia	1993	1	0
Total		1	0
