= Kelvin Mutale =

Zambian footballer (1969-1993)

Personal information
- Full name: Kelvin Mutale
- Date of birth: 20 September 1969
- Place of birth: Zambia
- Date of death: 27 April 1993 (aged 23)
- Place of death: Atlantic Ocean, off Gabon
- Position: Forward

Senior career*
Years	Team	Apps	(Gls)
1988–1992	Nkana Red Devils		
1992–1993	Al-Ettifaq		

International career
1991–1993	Zambia	10	(12)
- * Club domestic league appearances and goals

Kelvin Mutale (20 September 1969 – 27 April 1993) was a Zambian footballer and member of the national team. He was among those killed in the crash of the team plane in Gabon in 1993.

== Career ==
Mutale played club football for NCZ F.C. in kafue before joining Nkana F.C. in Zambia and Ettifaq FC in Saudi Arabia.

Mutale made several appearances for the Zambia national football team, including four FIFA World Cup qualifying matches.
