= Patrick Banda =

Zambian footballer (1974-1993)

Personal information
- Full name: Patrick Banda
- Date of birth: 28 January 1974
- Place of birth: Zambia
- Date of death: 27 April 1993 (aged 19)
- Place of death: Atlantic Ocean, off Gabon
- Position: Forward

International career
Years	Team	Apps	(Gls)
1992	Zambia	6	(3)

Patrick Banda (28 January 1974 – 27 April 1993) was a Zambian footballer and member of the national team. He was among those killed in the crash of the team plane in Gabon in 1993.
