= Enrique Estébanez =

Spanish field hockey player (1912–1993)

Personal information
- Full name: Enrique Estébanez Vela
- Nationality: Spanish
- Born: 23 October 1912 Madrid, Spain
- Died: 14 April 1993 (aged 80) Madrid, Spain

Sport
- Sport: Field hockey

Enrique Estébanez Vela (23 October 1912 – 14 April 1993) was a Spanish field hockey player. He competed in the men's tournament at the 1948 Summer Olympics. Estébanez died in Madrid on 14 April 1993, at the age of 80.
