= Timothy Mwitwa =

Zambian footballer (1968-1993)

Personal information
- Full name: Timothy Mwitwa
- Date of birth: 21 May 1968
- Place of birth: Zambia
- Date of death: 27 April 1993 (aged 24)
- Place of death: Atlantic Ocean, off Gabon
- Position: Striker

Senior career*
Years	Team	Apps	(Gls)
1986–1990	Kabwe Warriors		
1990–1991	AC Sparta Prague	7	(0)
1991–1993	Nkana		
Total		7+	(0+)

International career
1988–1993	Zambia	17	(2)
- * Club domestic league appearances and goals

Timothy Mwitwa (21 May 1968 – 27 April 1993) was a Zambian professional footballer who played as a forward. He was a member of the Zambia national team. He was among those killed in the crash of the team plane in Gabon in 1993.

== Career ==
Timothy Mwitwa started his playing career at Kabwe Rangers FC, a club run by the Kabwe Municipal Council, before attending trials at the "Magnificent" Kabwe Warriors FC in 1986 and got picked under the tutelage of late Godfrey "Ucar" Chitalu as coach of the club. Mwitwa was part of the Kabwe Warriors team that won their first Zambian Super league championship in 15 years in the 1987 soccer season but got demoted the following year. The club also won the Champion of Champions Cup the same season under coach Bizwell Phiri.

Mwitwa featured for the Kabwe Warriors squad that participated in the African Cup of Champions Clubs in 1988, where they were knocked out in the second round by Al Hilal of Sudan. Mwitwa was sent off early on in the first half of the second leg tie in Omdurman, with Warriors going on to lose 3–1, having held Al Hilal 0–0 in the first leg in Kabwe.

Warriors played in the lower first division in the 1988 season, losing only one game to Monze Swallows and were promoted right back to the Super Division the following year. Most soccer pundits expected Warriors to lose most of their star players (including Mwitwa, goal keeper Richard Mwanza, defenders Whiteson Changwe, Samuel Chomba and James Chitalu among others) but the club managed to hold on to all their players, a feat that is attributed to their promotion at first attempt.

Mwitwa later played club football for Nkana F.C. in Zambia making only a few appearances in the 1993 season before the Gabon tragedy. He is regarded as one of the finest talents to have ever emerged from Kabwe town as well as Kabwe Warriors football club, hence his nicknames "Teacher" and Tim "Tiger". In 1990, he joined AC Sparta Prague where he appeared in seven Czechoslovak First League matches.

Mwitwa made several appearances for the Zambia national team and participated in the 1990 and 1992 African Cup of Nations finals.

== Career statistics ==
=== International ===
As of match played 25 April 1993.

Appearances and goals by national team and year
National team	Year	Apps	Goals
Zambia	1988	5	0
Zambia	1989	2	0
Zambia	1990	2	0
Zambia	1991	1	0
Zambia	1992	4	1
Zambia	1993	3	1
Total		17	3

Scores and results list Zambia's goal tally first, score column indicates score after each Mwitwa goal.

List of international goals scored by Timothy Mwitwa
No.	Date	Venue	Cap	Opponent	Score	Result	Competition	Ref.
1.	30 August 1992	FNB Stadium, Johannesburg, South Africa	14	South Africa	1–0	1–0	1994 Africa Cup of Nations qualification	
2.	28 February 1993	Independence Stadium, Lusaka, Zambia	15	Madagascar	3–0	3–1	1994 FIFA World Cup qualification	
