= 2024–25 Zambia Super League =

64th Season of the Zambia Super League

Zambia Super League
- Season: 2024–25
- Dates: 17 August 2024 – 17 May 2025
- Champions: Power Dynamos (8th title)
- Relegated: Forest Rangers; Indeni; Lumwana Radiants; Atletico Lusaka
- CAF Champions League: Power Dynamos
- CAF Confederation Cup: ZESCO United
- Matches: 288
- Goals: 538 (1.87 per match)
- Top goalscorer: Idris Illunga Mbombo (12 goals)
- Biggest home win: Green Buffaloes 4–0 Indeni (25 August); Nchanga Rangers 4–0 Lumwana Radiants (28 August)
- Biggest away win: Indeni 0–2 Zanaco (17 August); Lumwana Radiants 0–2 Mufulira Wanderers (12 September)
- Highest scoring: Forest Rangers 3–1 Atletico Lusaka (17 August); Green Buffaloes 4–0 Indeni (25 August); Nchanga Rangers 4–0 Lumwana Radiants (28 August); MUZA 3–1 Indeni (1 September)
- Longest winning run: 3 matches ZESCO United (1 September – 11 September)
- Longest unbeaten run: 4 matches Forest Rangers (17 August – 1 September); Power Dynamos (17 August – 8 September); ZESCO United (1 September – 11 September); 3 matches Kabwe Warriors (17 August – 31 August); Red Arrows (28 August – 8 September)
- Longest winless run: 4 matches Indeni (17 August – 31 August); Lumwana Radiants (17 August – 12 September); Mutondo Stars (17 August – 1 September)
- Longest losing run: 3 matches Lumwana Radiants (24 August – 12 September)
- All statistics correct as of 20 April 2025.

The 2024–25 Zambia Super League, known as the MTN Super League for sponsorship purposes, was the 64th season of the top-tier association football league in Zambia, which began on 17 August 2024. Red Arrows are the defending champions.

It was won by Power Dynamos, who earned their eighth league title.

== Teams ==
=== Changes from previous season ===
The league is composed of 18 teams; the 14 teams from the previous season and the promoted teams: Lumwana Radiants, Nchanga Rangers, Atletico Lusaka and Indeni.

▲ Promoted from 2023–24 National Division One	▼ Relegated to 2024–25 National Division One
Nchanga Rangers; Lumwana Radiants; Atletico Lusaka; Indeni	Trident; Kansanshi Dynamos; Prison Leopards; Konkola Blades

=== Stadiums and locations ===
Team	Location	Stadium	Capacity
Atletico Lusaka	Lusaka	Toyota Arena	5,000
Forest Rangers	Ndola	Levy Mwanawasa Stadium	49,800
Green Buffaloes	Lusaka	Independence Stadium	30,000
Green Eagles	Choma	Independence Stadium	30,000
Indeni FC	Ndola	Indeni Sports Complex	5,000
Kabwe Warriors	Kabwe	Godfrey Chitalu Stadium	10,000
Lumwana Radiants	Kalumbila District	Lumwana Football Pitch	3,000
Mufulira Wanderers	Mufulira	Shinde Stadium	10,000
Mutondo Stars	Kitwe		
Muza	Mazabuka	Nakambala Stadium	5,000
Napsa Stars	Lusaka	Nkoloma Stadium	5,000
Nchanga Rangers	Chingola	Nchanga Stadium	20,000
Nkana FC	Kitwe	Nkana Stadium	10,000
Nkwazi FC	Lusaka	Edwin Imboela Stadium	6,000
Power Dynamos	Kitwe	Arthur Davies Stadium	15,500
Red Arrows	Lusaka	Nkoloma Stadium	5,000
Zanaco	Lusaka	Sunset Stadium	5,100
ZESCO United	Ndola	Levy Mwanawasa Stadium	49,800

== Standings ==
Pos	Team	Pld	W	D	L	GF	GA	GD	Pts	Qualification or relegation
1	Power Dynamos (C)	34	20	8	6	54	22	+32	68	Qualification for 2025–26 Champions League
2	ZESCO United	34	17	12	5	34	20	+14	63	Qualification for 2025–26 Confederation Cup
3	Nkana	34	16	10	8	48	29	+19	58	
4	Red Arrows	34	15	11	8	32	24	+8	56	
5	Kabwe Warriors	34	13	12	9	38	27	+11	51	
6	Nkwazi	34	12	14	8	31	26	+5	50	
7	Green Buffaloes	34	11	12	11	34	35	−1	45	
8	Mufulira Wanderers	34	13	6	15	30	31	−1	45	
9	Napsa Stars	34	9	17	8	24	22	+2	44	
10	MUZA	34	11	11	12	33	34	−1	44	
11	Nchanga Rangers	34	9	15	10	29	28	+1	42	
12	Green Eagles	34	9	14	11	32	34	−2	41	
13	Mutondo Stars	34	10	11	13	26	34	−8	41	
14	Zanaco	34	9	12	13	34	41	−7	39	
15	Atletico Lusaka (R)	34	10	9	15	27	46	−19	39	Relegation to 2025–26 Zambian Division One
16	Forest Rangers (R)	34	7	17	10	31	34	−3	38	Relegation to 2025–26 Zambian Division One
17	Lumwana Radiants (R)	34	10	7	17	21	36	−15	37	Relegation to 2025–26 Zambian Division One
18	Indeni (R)	34	3	6	25	20	55	−35	15	Relegation to 2025–26 Zambian Division One

Source: ESPN RSSSF
Rules for classification: 1) points; 2) goal difference; 3) goals scored; 4) head-to-head points; 5) head-to-head goal difference
(C) Champions; (R) Relegated

== Results ==
Home \ Away	AOL	FOR	BUF	EAG	IDN	KAB	LUR	MUW	MUS	MUZ	NAP	NCR	NKA	NKW	POW	RED	ZAN	ZES
Atletico Lusaka	—			1–0				0–0			1–1	0–0	2–1	0–0				
Forest Rangers	3–1	—	0–0				2–1			2–2				0–2				2–2
Green Buffaloes	0–0		—		4–0		2–0			0–1							2–1	1–1
Green Eagles				—	2–1	1–1		1–0	1–1		1–1		2–1					
Indeni					—	0–1			0–1		1–1		0–3		0–0		0–2	
Kabwe Warriors	3–0	2–2	1–1			—				3–0		2–0				0–2		
Lumwana Radiants				0–1	2–1	0–1	—	0–2							0–2		0–0	
Mufulira Wanderers						0–0		—	0–2		1–0	2–0	1–3		1–2			
Mutondo Stars		2–1	1–4						—	0–1		1–1	1–1			3–1		
MUZA	2–0				3–1		2–1	0–0		—					0–1		2–2	
Napsa Stars		0–0	1–2								—	3–0	0–1			1–0		0–1
Nchanga Rangers				1–2			4–0			3–0		—		1–1		1–0		1–2
Nkana		2–0					0–0					0–0	—	0–0		3–1		0–1
Nkwazi				0–0	1–0			2–1	2–0		0–1			—			0–0	
Power Dynamos	5–0	1–1	1–2			2–1			1–0				1–1		—	0–0		
Red Arrows			1–0	1–1			0–0			1–0				1–0		—		2–0
Zanaco	0–1	1–1				0–2			1–1		0–1				1–1		—	
ZESCO United	3–2			1–0	1–0			2–0						1–1	2–0		0–0	—

Updated to match(es) played on 17 May 2025. Source: RSSSF BetExplorer
Legend: Blue = home team win; Yellow = draw; Red = away team win.
For upcoming matches, an "a" indicates there is an article about the rivalry between the two participants.

=== Positions by round ===
To preserve chronological order, any postponed matches are added to the round they were played, not when originally scheduled.

Team ╲ Round	1	2	3	4	5	6	7	8	9	10	11	12	13	14	15	16	17	18	19	20	21	22	23	24	25	26	27	28	29	30	31	32	33	34	35
ZESCO United	1	3	3	1	1	2	2	1	1	1	1	1	1	2	1	1	1	1	1	1	1	1	1	1	1	1	1	1	1	1	1	1	1	1	
Kabwe Warriors	6	1	2	2	3	3	3	3	3	3	3	3	2	1	2	2	2	2	2	2	2	2	2	2	2	2	2	2	2	2	2	2	2	2	
Nkana	8	11	10	7	7	7	6	7	7	5	3	3	3	3	3	3	3	3	3	3	3	3	3	3	3	3	3	3	3	3	3	3	3	3	
Power Dynamos	4	5	6	6	4	4	5	4	4	4	4	4	4	4	4	4	4	4	4	4	4	4	4	4	4	4	4	4	4	4	4	4	4	4	
Red Arrows	5	4	4	4	5	5	1	5	5	7	5	5	5	5	5	5	5	5	5	5	5	5	5	5	5	5	5	5	5	5	5	5	5	5	
Green Eagles	3	7	7	5	6	6	7	6	6	6	6	6	6	6	6	6	6	6	6	6	6	6	6	6	6	6	6	6	6	6	6	6	6	6	
Green Buffaloes	10	8	5	8	8	8	8	8	8	8	7	7	7	7	7	7	7	7	7	7	7	7	7	7	7	7	7	7	7	7	7	7	7	7	
Nkwazi	2	6	8	9	9	9	9	9	9	9	9	9	8	8	8	8	8	8	8	8	8	8	8	8	8	8	8	8	8	8	8	8	8	8	
Nchanga Rangers	1	2	1	3	2	1	3	2	2	2	2	2	1	2	1	2	2	4	3	3	7	7	7	7	7	7	7	7	7	7	7	7	7	9	
MUZA	12	10	12	12	12	12	12	12	12	12	12	12	12	12	12	12	12	12	12	12	10	10	10	10	10	10	10	10	10	10	10	10	10	10	
Mufulira Wanderers	11	12	11	10	10	10	10	10	10	10	10	10	11	11	11	11	11	11	11	11	11	11	11	11	11	11	11	11	11	11	11	11	11	11	
Atletico Lusaka	7	9	9	11	11	11	11	11	11	11	11	11	9	9	9	9	9	9	9	9	9	9	9	9	9	9	9	9	9	9	9	9	9	12	
Mutondo Stars	9	13	13	13	13	13	13	13	13	13	13	13	13	13	13	13	13	13	13	13	13	13	13	13	13	13	13	13	13	13	13	13	13	13	
Napsa Stars	14	14	14	14	14	14	14	14	14	14	14	14	14	14	14	14	14	14	14	14	14	14	14	14	14	14	14	14	14	14	14	14	14	14	
Zanaco	13	15	15	15	15	15	15	15	15	15	15	15	15	15	15	15	15	15	15	15	15	15	15	15	15	15	15	15	15	15	15	15	15	15	
Forest Rangers	16	16	16	16	16	16	16	16	16	16	16	16	16	16	16	16	16	16	16	16	16	16	16	16	16	16	16	16	16	16	16	16	16	16	
Lumwana Radiants	15	17	17	17	17	17	17	17	17	17	17	17	17	17	17	17	17	17	17	17	17	17	17	17	17	17	17	17	17	17	17	17	17	17	
Indeni	18	18	18	18	18	18	18	18	18	18	18	18	18	18	18	18	18	18	18	18	18	18	18	18	18	18	18	18	18	18	18	18	18	18	

Qualification for CAF Champions League
Qualification for CAF Confederation Cup
Relegation to Division One

Updated to match(es) played on 17 May 2025. Source: RSSSF

== Season statistics ==
=== Scoring ===
==== Top scorers ====
As of 18 September 2024

Rank	Player	Club	Goals
1	(Zambia) Maxwell Mulutula	Nchanga Rangers	5
2	(Zambia) Benjamin Chisala	Atletico Lusaka	3
3	(Zambia) Merlin Kapela	Green Buffaloes	2
3	(Zambia) Laurent Mwanza	Nchanga Rangers	2
3	(Zambia) Christopher Zulu	Nkwazi	2
3	(Zambia) Titus Chansa	Mutondo Stars	2
3	(Zambia) Stephen Mutama	Green Buffaloes	2
8	38 players tied	15 teams	1

==== Own goals ====
As of 18 September 2024

Rank	Player	Club	Own goals
1	(Zambia) Sydney Kasanda	Nchanga Rangers	1
1	(Zambia) Sharpy Chikondi	Nchanga Rangers	1

=== Hat-tricks ===
As of 18 September 2024

Player	For	Against	Result	Date
(Zambia) Maxwell Mulutula	Nchanga Rangers	Lumwana Radiants	4–1 (H)	28 August 2024

Note

(H) – Home; (A) – Away
