= List of football clubs in Zambia =

The following is an incomplete list of association football clubs based in Zambia. Clubs are grouped by their current league tier for clarity. The league system is organised by the Football Association of Zambia (FAZ), which administers the top three tiers of Zambian football. For a complete alphabetical listing, see Category:Football clubs in Zambia.

== Zambia Super League (2025–26) ==
The Zambia Super League is the highest division of football in Zambia. The teams that competed in this division in the 2025–26 season were:

- FC MUZA (Mazabuka)
- FC Leopards (Kabwe) Relegated
- Green Buffaloes F.C. (Lusaka)
- Green Eagles F.C. (Choma)
- Kabwe Warriors F.C.
- Kansanshi Dynamos F.C.
- Konkola Blades F.C.
- Mines United F.C. (Kabwe) Relegated
- Mufulira Wanderers F.C. (Mufulira)
- Mutondo Stars F.C. (Kitwe)
- NAPSA Stars F.C. (Lusaka)
- Nchanga Rangers F.C. (Chingola)
- Nkana F.C. (Kitwe)
- Nkwazi F.C. (Lusaka)
- Power Dynamos F.C. (Kitwe) Champions
- Red Arrows F.C. (Lusaka)
- Zanaco F.C. (Lusaka)
- ZESCO United F.C. (Ndola)

== FAZ National Division One (2024–25) ==
Also known as the National League — the second tier of Zambian football. Includes clubs that competed across provinces:

=== Central Province ===
- Aguila Stars
- Young Prison Leopards

=== Copperbelt Province ===
- Chambishi F.C.
- Kitwe United F.C.
- Ndola United F.C.

=== Lusaka Province ===
- Chirundu United
- City of Lusaka F.C.
- Kafue Eagles
- Young Green Buffaloes F.C.

=== Eastern Province ===
- Chipata United

=== Northern Province ===
- Mpulungu Harbour

=== North-Western Province ===
- Kalumbila Quattro
- Trident F.C.

=== Southern Province ===
- Riverplate F.C.

== Provincial and district leagues ==
These leagues represent the third and lower tiers of Zambian football. Clubs listed below have notable regional presence or history in the upper tiers.

=== Copperbelt Province ===
- Roan United F.C. (Luanshya)
- Kansanshi Warriors F.C. (Solwezi)

=== Lusaka Province ===
- Happy Hearts F.C. (Lusaka)
- Romeki F.C. (Lusaka)

=== Southern Province ===
- Mazabuka United F.C. (Mazabuka)
- Monze Swallows F.C. (Monze)

=== Central Province ===
- Titans F.C. (Kalomo)
- Maamba Energy Stars (Sinazongwe)
- TP Ezaloch (Chikankata)
- Mukuni Royal F.C. (Livingstone)
- Blue Arrows (Kalomo)

=== Other notable clubs ===
Clubs that have appeared in upper tiers or hold historical significance:

- Kalomo Jetters F.C. (Kalomo)
- Luanshya Blue Devils F.C. (Luanshya)
- Mufulira Blackpool F.C. (Mufulira)
- National Assembly F.C. (Lusaka)
- Parmalat F.C. (Lusaka)
- Profund Warriors F.C. (Lusaka)

== See also ==
- Zambia Super League
- Zambian Division One
- Football in Zambia
