= 2026 Zambian Transition League =

Zambia Super League
- Season: 2026
- Dates: 12 September – December 2026

The 2026 Zambian Transition League is an upcoming transitional football league for the 2026 Zambian football season, organised by FAZ and the Zambian Premier League. The league is part of the transition from the August–May football calendar to the old calendar-year format running from March to November. It is the second transitional league since 2019. The league will be divided into two streams, Stream A and Stream B. The winners of the two streams will play a one-off final, with the winner becoming the 2026 Transition League champion..

The CAF competitions beginning in 2026 are based on the 2025/26 season. Zambia will therefore be represented by Power Dynamos in the CAF Champions League and Red Arrows in the CAF Confederation Cup. The 2026 Transitional Season will not have the usual ABSA Cup. Instead, the KCM Cup will be played. The winner of the KCM Cup could take Zambia's CAF Confederation Cup place for the CAF competition beginning in 2027, as the domestic cup winner holds the Confederation Cup place. This qualification arrangement is subject to official confirmation.

After the Transitional Season, the new full domestic season will begin in March 2027 and is expected to run until around November or December 2027. The winner of that season will represent Zambia in the 2028 CAF competitions.

== Background ==
The ZPL Board approved the changes during a meeting on 24 July 2026. The transition competition will keep the top-flight clubs playing before the start of the full 2027 season. The competition will also affect the Zambian Premier League's other leagues. The Women's Super League, Men's National League and Women's National League will be divided into Northern and Southern sections during the transition. From the 2027 season, the Men's National League and Women's Super League will return to nationwide competitions, while the Women's National League will continue to use a regional format.

== Competition format ==
The MTN Super League clubs will be divided into two streams according to their final positions in the 2025–26 league standings. Clubs that finished in odd-numbered positions will form the Odd Positions Stream, while those that finished in even-numbered positions will form the Even Positions Stream.

=== Odd Positions Stream ===
- Power Dynamos
- FC MUZA
- Nchanga Rangers
- ZANACO FC
- Konkola Blades
- Kansanshi Dynamos
- Nkana FC
- NAPSA Stars
- FC Leopards
- Makeni All Stars
- Trident FC

=== Even Positions Stream ===
- Red Arrows
- Kabwe Warriors
- Green Eagles
- Mufulira Wanderers
- ZESCO United
- Green Buffaloes
- Nkwazi FC
- Mutondo Stars
- Chirundu United
- Roan United

The ZPL had not released the fixtures at the time the format was announced.

== League tables ==
=== Stream A ===
Pos	Team	Pld	W	D	L	GF	GA	GD	Pts	Qualification or relegation
1	Power Dynamos	0	0	0	0	0	0	0	0	Qualification for the Championship play-off
2	Zanaco	0	0	0	0	0	0	0	0	Qualification for the CAF Confederation Cup
3	Nchanga Rangers	0	0	0	0	0	0	0	0	
4	FC Muza	0	0	0	0	0	0	0	0	
5	Kansanshi Dynamos	0	0	0	0	0	0	0	0	
6	Nkana	0	0	0	0	0	0	0	0	
7	NAPSA Stars	0	0	0	0	0	0	0	0	
8	Konkola Blades	0	0	0	0	0	0	0	0	
9	Trident FC	0	0	0	0	0	0	0	0	Relegation to National Division One
10	Makeni All Stars	0	0	0	0	0	0	0	0	Relegation to National Division One

Source: FootyStats
Rules for classification: 1) points; 2) total wins; 3) total goal differential; 4) total goals scored; 5) disciplinary points; 6) away goal differential; 7) away goals scored; 8) home goals scored; 9) home goal differential; 10) coin toss or drawing of lots

=== Stream B ===
Pos	Team	Pld	W	D	L	GF	GA	GD	Pts	Qualification or relegation
1	Red Arrows	0	0	0	0	0	0	0	0	Qualification for the Championship play-off
2	Kabwe Warriors	0	0	0	0	0	0	0	0	Qualification for the CAF Confederation Cup
3	Green Eagles	0	0	0	0	0	0	0	0	
4	Mufulira Wanderers	0	0	0	0	0	0	0	0	
5	ZESCO United	0	0	0	0	0	0	0	0	
6	Green Buffaloes	0	0	0	0	0	0	0	0	
7	Nkwazi	0	0	0	0	0	0	0	0	
8	Mutondo Stars	0	0	0	0	0	0	0	0	
9	Chirundu United	0	0	0	0	0	0	0	0	Relegation to National Division One
10	Roan United	0	0	0	0	0	0	0	0	Relegation to National Division One

Source: FootyStats
Rules for classification: 1) points; 2) total wins; 3) total goal differential; 4) total goals scored; 5) disciplinary points; 6) away goal differential; 7) away goals scored; 8) home goals scored; 9) home goal differential; 10) coin toss or drawing of lots
