= 2019–20 Zambia Super League =

Zambia Super League
- Season: 2019–20
- Champions: Nkana (13th Title)
- Relegated: Mufulira Wanderers Nakambala Leopards Kabwe YSA
- Matches: 243
- Goals: 491 (2.02 per match)
- Top goalscorer: James Chamanga (16 goals)
- Biggest home win: Zanaco 5-1 Nakambala Leopards
- Biggest away win: Kabwe YSA 1-6 Green Eagles
- Highest scoring: Kabwe YSA 1-6 Green Eagles
- Longest unbeaten run: Nkana (8 Matches)
- Longest winless run: Mufulira Wanderers (15 matches)
- All statistics correct as of August 29,2020.

The 2019-20 Zambia Super League is the 59th season of the Zambia Super League, the top-tier football league in Zambia. This is the first Super League season that has a new format which conforms with the CAF calendar. The league kicked off on 31 August. Zesco United are the defending champions and KYSA and Kansashi Dynamos are the newly promoted sides into the super league.

On 19 March 2020, the season was temporarily suspended by FAZ due to the effects of the COVID-19 pandemic. On 26 June, after nearly four months of the league's suspension, the FAZ announced that the league would resume on 18 July 2020 behind closed doors. The rescheduled matches would be played first, then the league will fully resume on 1 August 2020 with Round 26 fixtures and is scheduled to be completed on 30 August 2020.

== Teams ==
Locations of the 2019–20 Zambian Super League teams

Team	Location	Stadium	Capacity
Buildcon FC	Ndola	Levy Mwanawasa Stadium	49800
Forest Rangers FC	Ndola	Levy Mwanawasa Stadium	49800
Green Buffaloes FC	Lusaka	Independence Stadium	30000
Green Eagles FC	Lusaka	Independence Stadium	30000
Kabwe Warriors FC	Kabwe	Godfrey Chitalu Stadium	10000
Kabwe YSA F.C.	Kabwe	Godfrey Chitalu Stadium	10000
Kansanshi Dynamos FC	Solwezi	Solwezi Stadium	5000
Lumwana Radiants FC	Solwezi	Lumwana Football Pich	3000
Lusaka Dynamos FC	Lusaka	Sunset Stadium	5100
Mufulira Wanderers FC	Mufulira	Shinde Stadium	10000
Nakambala Leopards FC	Mazabuka	Nakambala Stadium	5000
NAPSA Stars FC	Lusaka	Nkoloma Stadium	5000
Nkana FC	Kitwe	Nkana Stadium	10000
Nkwazi FC	Lusaka	Edwin Imboela Stadium	6000
Power Dynamos FC	Kitwe	Arthur Davies Stadium	15500
Red Arrows FC	Lusaka	Nkoloma Stadium	5000
Zanaco FC	Lusaka	Sunset Stadium	5100
ZESCO United FC	Ndola	Levy Mwanawasa Stadium	49800

== League table ==
Pos	Team	Pld	W	D	L	GF	GA	GD	Pts	Qualification or relegation
1	Nkana (C)	27	14	8	5	35	18	+17	50	Qualified for 2020–21 CAF Champions League
2	Forest Rangers	27	14	8	5	32	19	+13	50	Qualified for 2020–21 CAF Champions League
3	Green Eagles	27	13	9	5	34	19	+15	48	Qualified for 2020–21 CAF Confederation Cup
4	NAPSA Stars	27	14	6	7	36	22	+14	48	Qualified for 2020–21 CAF Confederation Cup
5	ZESCO United	27	13	8	6	38	23	+15	47	
6	Power Dynamos	27	12	8	7	34	19	+15	44	
7	Zanaco	27	12	8	7	37	26	+11	44	
8	Kabwe Warriors	27	12	5	10	29	29	0	41	
9	Lusaka Dynamos	27	11	7	9	33	28	+5	40	
10	Red Arrows	27	11	7	9	26	28	−2	40	
11	Green Buffaloes	27	10	8	9	28	27	+1	38	
12	Nkwazi	27	6	14	7	18	20	−2	32	
13	Buildcon	27	8	8	11	29	35	−6	32	
14	Lumwana Radiants	27	8	7	12	21	22	−1	31	
15	Kansanshi Dynamos	27	6	10	11	19	24	−5	28	
16	Mufulira Wanderers (R)	27	4	5	18	17	39	−22	17	Relegated to Zambia National League
17	Nakambala Leopards (R)	27	4	5	18	15	45	−30	17	Relegated to Zambia National League
18	Kabwe Youth Soccer Academy (R)	27	3	5	19	16	54	−38	14	Relegated to Zambia National League

Source: Soccerway
Rules for classification: 1) points; 2) goal difference; 3) goals scored; 4) head-to-head points; 5) head-to-head goal difference
(C) Champions; (R) Relegated

== Results ==
Home \ Away	NSFC	NKFC	BNFC	ZNFC	KDFC	LDFC	NWFC	RAFC	ZUFC	KWFC	GEFC	KYSA	FRFC	LRFC	NLFC	PDFC	GBFC	MWFC
NAPSA Stars	—				1–0													
Nkana		—		3–0													2–0	2–3
Buildcon		1–0	—															
Zanaco				—							2–0	2–0						
Kansanshi Dynamos					—											1–0	1–0	
Lusaka Dynamos	0–1					—		1–1						1–0				
Nkwazi				3–2			—						1–0					
Red Arrows								—							1–0	2–1		
ZESCO United				1–0		2–1			—									
Kabwe Warriors							1–0			—								
Green Eagles										1–1	—				3–2			
Kabwe YSA	1–3		1–2							2–2		—						
Forest Rangers	1–0		2–2								0–1	1–1	—					
Lumwana Radiants								0–1						—				
Nakambala Leopards							1–1		0–3						—			
Power Dynamos						2–0										—		
Green Buffaloes																	—	1–0
Mufulira Wanderers	0–2				0–2			3–0										—

Updated to match(es) played on unknown. Source: soccerway
Legend: Blue = home team win; Yellow = draw; Red = away team win.
For upcoming matches, an "a" indicates there is an article about the rivalry between the two participants.

== Season statistics ==
=== Top scorers ===
No	Player	Club	Goals
1	James Chamanga	Power dynamos	16
2	Chris Mugalu	Lusaka Dynamoes	15
3	Idris Ilunga Mbombo	Nkana F.C.	14
