= 2025 ABSA Cup =

18th edition of the Absa Cup

ABSA Bank Zambia Cup

Tournament details
- Country: Zambia
- Dates: 15 March – 10 May 2025
- Teams: 21

Final positions
- Champions: ZESCO United (7th title)
- Runners-up: Red Arrows

Tournament statistics
- Matches played: 19
- Goals scored: 55 (2.89 per match)
- Top goal scorer: Wilfred Sikanyika (3 goals) (Red Arrows)

The 2025 Absa Cup was the 18th edition of the annual knock-out competition in Zambian football, organized by FAZ. For the second time in the tournament’s history, the competition featured 21 teams. Following a format revamp approved by FAZ and Absa Bank Zambia in 2024, the Absa Cup included 10 provincial teams, seven MTN Super League teams, and four ZPL National League teams. This expanded format was designed to enhance nationwide participation and increase excitement in the tournament. Ten provincial teams competed in preliminary matches held on 15–16 March to determine which clubs advanced to the Round of 16. From that stage, the competition followed a single-elimination format, with knockout rounds played through the quarterfinals and semifinals, culminating in the final.

== Teams ==
The ABSA Cup is a single-elimination tournament featuring 21 teams in 2025, an expanded format introduced in the 2023 edition. It consisted of: 10 provincial representatives from Zambia’s ten provinces, who contested in a preliminary round. 7 MTN Super League clubs (top tier) and 4 National Division One teams (second tier), who entered in the Round of 16. All rounds were drawn randomly, with matches played at neutral venues across Zambia.

Round	Main date (weekends)	Number of fixtures	Clubs remaining	New entries this round	Winner prize money	Loser prize money	Divisions entering this round
Preliminary round	15–16 March 2025	5	21 → 16	10 provincial teams	K15,000	K10,000	10 Provincial Division One teams
Round of 16	5–6 April 2025	8	16 → 8	7 Super League teams 4 National Division One teams	K30,000	K20,000	MTN Super League; National Division One
Quarter-finals	12–13 April 2025	4	8 → 4	None	K75,000	K30,000	None
Semi-finals	26 April 2025	2	4 → 2	None	K200,000	K100,000	None
Final	10 May 2025	1	2 → 1	None	K1,000,000	K400,000	None

== Preliminary round ==
A total of 10 provincial teams played in the preliminary round, joined later in the Round of 16 by 7 MTN Super League clubs (tier 1) and 4 National Division One clubs (tier 2). Provincial clubs represented Zambia’s 10 provinces.

Number of teams per tier still in competition
MTN Super League (Note: Super League and National Division One teams joined in the Round of 16.)	National Division One	Provincial Division One	Total
7 / 7	4 / 4	10 / 10	21 / 21

=== Provincial Preliminary Round Matches ===
15 March 2025	Makeni All Stars	2–2 (Makeni won 5–4 pens)	Muchinga Blue Eagles	Lusaka
15:00 CAT	Kenani Phiri 45'; *Kenani Phiri 76'		Peter Katuma 33'; *Izukanji Simfukwe 86'	Stadium: Nkoloma Stadium; Attendance: 1,200; Referee: Joseph Bwalya

15 March 2025	Nangweshi Pirates	1–2	Air Power	Lusaka
15:00 CAT	Steve Lwesha 48'		Paul Mwachisema 43'; *Damiano Kola 49'	Stadium: Nkoloma Stadium; Attendance: 950; Referee: Felix Chibwe

15 March 2025	Roan United	1–0	Young Nkwazi	Kitwe
17:00 CAT	Robby Chifyalwa 19'			Stadium: Nkana Stadium; Attendance: 800; Referee: Andrew Zulu

16 March 2025	Solwezi Academy	1–0	Mathkat United	Kitwe
15:00 CAT	Enock Sachifula 38'			Stadium: Nkana Stadium; Attendance: 600; Referee: Patrick Lungu

16 March 2025	Barts FC	1–0	Teta FC	Kitwe
17:00 CAT	Martin Mweemba 82'			Stadium: Nkana Stadium; Attendance: 750; Referee: Brian Banda

== Round of 16 ==
The 16 winners from the preliminary round and National Division One clubs played in the Round of 16.

Number of teams per tier still in competition
Super League	National Division One	Provincial Teams	
7 / 16	4 / 4	5 / 10	16 / 21

5 April 2025	Kansanshi Dynamos	4–1	Green Buffaloes	Kabwe
13:00 CAT	Dalisto Lungu 11'; Mathews Mwale 31'; Brighton Kabamba 50'; Kizito Kezron 75'		Lyson Banda 21'	Stadium: Godfrey Ucar Chitalu Stadium; Attendance: 2,350; Referee: Martin Malama

5 April 2025	Mpulungu Harbour	1–6	Red Arrows	Kabwe
15:30 CAT	Kelvin Shamujompa 69'		Wilfred Sikanyika 18'; Paul Katema 33'; Saddam Yusuf Phiri 39'; Noris Mubanga 74'; Derrick Bulaya 76'; Angel Lubamba 85'	Stadium: Godfrey Ucar Chitalu Stadium; Attendance: 3,150; Referee: Andrew Banda

5 April 2025	Solwezi Academy	0–2	Konkola Blades	Kitwe
15:00 CAT			Progress Mukuka 41'; Mike Nyagu 76'	Stadium: Arthur Davies Stadium; Attendance: 1,800; Referee: Felix Chanda

5 April 2025	Roan United	1–1 (Nkana won 3–1 on penalties)	Nkana	Kitwe
17:30 CAT	Wilfred Chitbo 45' (pen.)		Idris Mbombo 75'	Stadium: Arthur Davies Stadium; Attendance: 4,000; Referee: Patrick Phiri
	Penalties
	(penalty missed) Robby Chifyalwa; (penalty scored) Kenani Phiri; (penalty missed) Chris Mulenga		(penalty scored) Idris Mbombo; (penalty scored) Kelvin Kampamba; (penalty scored) Duncan Mwape

6 April 2025	Prison Leopards	0–0 (Green Eagles won 4–2 on penalties)	Green Eagles	Lusaka
13:00 CAT				Stadium: Nkoloma Stadium; Attendance: 2,500; Referee: Brian Mwansa

6 April 2025	Air Power	0–3	Power Dynamos	Lusaka
15:30 CAT			Titus Chansa 3', 62'; Osmond Chita 37'	Stadium: Nkoloma Stadium; Attendance: 3,700; Referee: James Zulu

6 April 2025	Barts FC	1–3	ZESCO United	Kabwe
13:00 CAT	Semiwe Mwila 50'		Lindo Mkhota 21'; Peter Musukuma 29'; John Chingandu 59'	Stadium: Godfrey Ucar Chitalu Stadium; Attendance: 3,000; Referee: Steven Banda

6 April 2025	Makeni All Stars	0–2	Kabwe Warriors	Kabwe
15:30 CAT			David Obashi 11'; Saith Sakala 54'	Stadium: Godfrey Ucar Chitalu Stadium; Attendance: 2,800; Referee: Richard Phiri

== Quarter-finals ==
The eight winners from the Round of 16 played in the quarter-finals.

Number of teams per tier still in competition
Super League	National Division One	Provincial Teams	
6 / 16	2 / 4	0 / 10	8 / 21

12 April 2025	ZESCO United	2–0	Konkola Blades	Kitwe
13:00 CAT	Abraham Siankombo 2'; Lindo Mkhota 80'			Stadium: Arthur Davies Stadium; Attendance: 5,200; Referee: Patrick Phiri

12 April 2025	Kansanshi Dynamos	0–0 (Nkana won 3–2 on penalties)	Nkana	Kitwe
15:30 CAT				Stadium: Arthur Davies Stadium; Attendance: 6,100; Referee: James Banda
	Penalties
	(penalty scored) John Zulu; (penalty missed) Kizito Kezron; (penalty missed) Dalisto Lungu		(penalty scored) Idris Mbombo; (penalty scored) Kelvin Kampamba; (penalty scored) Duncan Mwape

13 April 2025	Red Arrows	3–1	Green Eagles	Lusaka
13:00 CAT	Wilfred Sikanyika 23'; Michee Malonga 71', 90+'		Simon Mulenga 25' (pen.)	Stadium: Nkoloma Stadium; Attendance: 7,000; Referee: Brian Mwansa

13 April 2025	Kabwe Warriors	0–2	Power Dynamos	Lusaka
15:30 CAT			Eddie Ankobo 23', 32'	Stadium: Nkoloma Stadium; Attendance: 5,500; Referee: Steven Chibwe

== Semi-finals ==
The four winners from the quarter-finals played in the semi-finals. All four teams remaining were MTN Super League sides. On 23 April 2025, the Football Association of Zambia (FAZ) and ABSA Bank Zambia reversed an earlier decision to relocate the 2025 ABSA Cup semi-finals. Initially scheduled for Kabwe’s Railway Stadium — due to crowd-safety concerns from a derby incident at Ndola—the matches will now proceed as originally planned at Levy Mwanawasa Stadium in Ndola FAZ explained the reversal followed widespread alarm over spectator safety after the Kitwe Derby between Nkana and Power Dynamos, during which over 500 stadium seats were damaged by Nkana supporters. In response, FAZ and ABSA reassessed the situation, concluding that full preparations at Ndola should continue.

Number of teams per tier still in competition
Super League	National Division One	Provincial Teams	
4 / 16	0 / 4	0 / 10	4 / 21

26 April 2025	Red Arrows	1–0	Power Dynamos	Ndola
15:00 CAT	Joseph Phiri 58'			Stadium: Levy Mwanawasa Stadium; Attendance: 10,800; Referee: Andrew Zulu

26 April 2025	ZESCO United	1–0	Nkana	Ndola
17:30 CAT	Peter Musukuma 55'			Stadium: Levy Mwanawasa Stadium; Attendance: 12,400; Referee: Felix Lungu

== Final ==
Number of teams per tier still in competition
Super League	National Division One	Provincial Teams	
2 / 16	0 / 4	0 / 10	2 / 21

10 May 2025	ZESCO United	1–1 (a.e.t.) (4–2 p)	Red Arrows	Ndola
15:00 CAT	Abraham Siankombo 28'		Joseph Phiri 53'	Stadium: Levy Mwanawasa Stadium; Attendance: 15,200; Referee: James Phiri
	Penalties
	(penalty scored) Peter Musukuma; (penalty scored) Lindo Mkhota; (penalty scored) Kelvin Kampamba; (penalty scored) John Chingandu		(penalty scored) Saddam Phiri; (penalty missed) Wilfred Sikanyika; (penalty scored) Derrick Bulaya; (penalty missed) Michee Malonga

== Top goalscorers ==
Rank	Player	Club	Goals
1	Wilfred Sikanyika	Red Arrows F.C.	3
2	Michee Malonga	Red Arrows F.C.	2
2	Titus Chansa	Power Dynamos F.C.	2
2	Eddie Ankobo	Power Dynamos F.C.	2
2	Lindo Mkhota	ZESCO United F.C.	2
2	Abraham Siankombo	ZESCO United F.C.	2
2	Angel Lubamba	Red Arrows F.C.	2
8	Joseph Phiri (footballer)	Red Arrows F.C.	1
8	Peter Musukuma	ZESCO United F.C.	1
8	Saddam Yusuf Phiri	Red Arrows F.C.	1
8	Dalisto Lungu	Kansanshi Dynamos	1
8	Brighton Kabamba	Kansanshi Dynamos	1
8	Kizito Kezron	Kansanshi Dynamos	1
8	Derrick Bulaya	Red Arrows F.C.	1
8	Noris Mubanga	Red Arrows F.C.	1
8	Mathews Mwale	Kansanshi Dynamos	1
8	Progress Mukuka	Konkola Blades F.C.	1
8	Mike Nyagu	Konkola Blades F.C.	1
8	Idris Mbombo	Nkana F.C.	1
8	Osmond Chita	Power Dynamos F.C.	1
8	John Chingandu	ZESCO United F.C.	1
