= 2022–23 Zambia Super League =

62nd Zambian top-flight football league season

Zambia Super League
- Season: 2022–23
- Dates: 20 August 2022 – 27 May 2023
- Champions: Power Dynamos
- Relegated: Nchanga Rangers; Lumwana Radiants; Chambishi; Buildcon
- CAF Champions League: Power Dynamos
- CAF Confederation Cup: Maestro United
- Matches: 306
- Goals: 641 (2.09 per match)
- Top goalscorer: Andy Boyeli (17 goals)

The 2022–23 Zambia Super League, known as the MTN Super League for sponsorship purposes, is the 62nd season of the top-tier association football league in Zambia which began on 20 August 2022. Red Arrows are the defending champions.

== Teams ==
The league is composed of 18 teams; the 14 teams from the previous season and the promoted teams: Muza, NAPSA Stars, Nchanga Rangers and Lumwana Radiants.

Team	Location	Stadium	Capacity
Buildcon	Ndola	Levy Mwanawasa Stadium	49,800
Chambishi	Chambishi	Chambishi Stadium	5,000
Forest Rangers	Ndola	Levy Mwanawasa Stadium	49,800
Green Buffaloes	Lusaka	Independence Stadium	30,000
Green Eagles	Choma	Independence Stadium	30,000
Kabwe Warriors	Kabwe	Godfrey Chitalu Stadium	10,000
Kansanshi Dynamos	Solwezi	Solwezi Stadium	5,000
Lumwana Radiants	Solwezi	Lumwana Football Pitch	3,000
Muza	Mazabuka	Nakambala Stadium	5,000
Napsa Stars	Lusaka	Nkoloma Stadium	5,000
Nchanga Rangers	Chingola	Nchanga Stadium	20,000
Nkana FC	Kitwe	Nkana Stadium	10,000
Nkwazi FC	Lusaka	Edwin Imboela Stadium	6,000
Power Dynamos	Kitwe	Arthur Davies Stadium	15,500
Prison Leopards	Kabwe	Godfrey Chitalu Stadium	10,000
Red Arrows	Lusaka	Nkoloma Stadium	5,000
Zanaco	Lusaka	Sunset Stadium	5,100
ZESCO United	Ndola	Levy Mwanawasa Stadium	49,800

Locations of the 2022–23 Zambia Super League teams

== Standings ==
Pos	Team	Pld	W	D	L	GF	GA	GD	Pts	Qualification or relegation
1	Power Dynamos (C)	34	17	14	3	48	19	+29	65	Qualification for Champions League
2	Maestro United	34	17	8	9	43	28	+15	59	Qualification for Confederation Cup
3	ZESCO United	34	15	10	9	46	27	+19	55	
4	Green Buffaloes	34	13	16	5	41	29	+12	55	
5	Napsa Stars	34	13	12	9	40	26	+14	51	
6	Red Arrows	34	12	14	8	44	36	+8	50	
7	Green Eagles	34	14	8	12	36	34	+2	50	
8	Forest Rangers	34	11	15	8	30	24	+6	48	
9	Nkana	34	12	12	10	32	27	+5	48	
10	Kansanshi Dynamos	34	12	12	10	33	31	+2	48	
11	Kabwe Warriors	34	10	16	8	37	27	+10	46	
12	Prison Leopards	34	10	15	9	35	36	−1	45	
13	Zanaco	34	10	11	13	32	32	0	41	
14	Nkwazi	34	9	12	13	30	33	−3	39	
15	Nchanga Rangers (R)	34	8	13	13	32	43	−11	37	Relegation to Zambian Division One
16	Lumwana Radiants (R)	34	7	13	14	32	40	−8	34	Relegation to Zambian Division One
17	Chambishi (R)	34	9	5	20	34	60	−26	32	Relegation to Zambian Division One
18	Buildcon (R)	34	2	4	28	16	89	−73	10	Relegation to Zambian Division One

Source: ESPN
Rules for classification: 1) points; 2) goal difference; 3) goals scored; 4) head-to-head points; 5) head-to-head goal difference
(C) Champions; (R) Relegated

== Results ==
Home \ Away	BUI	CHA	FOR	BUF	EAG	KAB	KAN	LUM	MUZ	NAP	NCH	NKA	NKW	POW	PRI	RED	ZAN	ZES
Buildcon	—	1–2	0–5	0–1	0–3	0–4	0–4	1–0	0–2	0–0	2–0	1–3	0–4	0–5	1–2	1–2	1–1	0–6
Chambishi	4–2	—	0–0	0–3	1–2	0–0	0–2	1–0	1–2	0–0	0–1	1–1	0–1	2–4	2–1	0–3	0–1	2–0
Forest Rangers	1–1	2–0	—	0–0	1–2	1–1	0–0	2–0	0–1	1–0	1–0	1–3	1–0	0–2	1–0	1–1	1–0	0–1
Green Buffaloes	1–0	2–0	1–1	—	0–1	2–2	2–2	2–1	1–2	2–0	0–0	1–0	3–3	0–0	2–2	1–1	2–1	2–1
Green Eagles	4–0	0–2	0–0	0–0	—	0–0	3–1	1–3	1–0	2–2	1–2	0–1	1–1	1–0	3–1	2–2	2–1	0–0
Kabwe Warriors	1–1	3–1	0–1	2–2	2–0	—	1–0	0–0	1–2	0–1	2–1	1–0	3–0	2–3	2–1	1–0	0–0	0–0
Kansanshi Dynamos	3–0	2–3	2–2	2–1	2–0	1–0	—	0–0	1–0	0–0	2–1	0–0	1–0	1–3	0–2	0–0	1–1	1–0
Lumwana Radiants	2–0	1–0	1–2	0–1	3–1	2–2	0–0	—	1–2	1–0	1–1	0–0	2–2	0–0	0–0	1–0	1–1	1–1
Maestro United	4–0	3–2	1–0	1–1	1–0	0–2	0–1	1–2	—	1–1	2–0	1–0	2–0	0–0	1–2	0–0	2–1	1–0
Napsa Stars	5–0	1–2	1–1	4–1	2–1	1–0	0–0	1–0	3–0	—	2–0	1–1	0–0	0–1	4–1	3–1	1–2	2–1
Nchanga Rangers	1–0	3–3	2–0	0–0	1–0	1–1	2–1	1–1	1–1	1–1	—	1–1	0–0	0–0	1–1	2–2	2–1	1–3
Nkana	2–1	1–2	1–1	1–1	0–1	0–0	2–0	2–1	1–0	1–0	3–1	—	2–1	0–1	1–1	0–0	1–2	1–0
Nkwazi	2–0	2–0	2–1	0–2	1–0	1–1	0–1	3–0	1–4	0–1	2–1	0–0	—	0–1	1–1	0–0	0–0	0–1
Power Dynamos	4–0	3–1	0–0	0–1	0–0	3–3	0–0	3–1	0–0	1–0	1–0	2–0	1–1	—	3–0	4–0	0–0	1–1
Prison Leopards	2–0	3–1	0–0	0–0	0–1	0–0	1–1	3–2	0–0	2–2	1–0	0–0	1–0	0–1	—	1–1	1–0	1–1
Red Arrows	2–1	5–1	1–1	1–0	0–1	1–0	3–0	3–3	0–3	0–0	3–1	0–1	2–1	5–1	3–1	—	0–0	0–3
Zanaco	4–0	2–0	0–1	0–0	1–2	0–0	1–0	1–0	3–2	0–1	1–2	3–2	0–1	0–0	0–2	1–1	—	1–0
ZESCO United	3–2	3–0	0–0	1–3	3–0	1–0	3–1	2–1	1–1	2–0	3–1	1–0	0–0	0–0	1–1	0–1	3–2	—

Source: BetExplorer
Legend: Blue = home team win; Yellow = draw; Red = away team win.
For upcoming matches, an "a" indicates there is an article about the rivalry between the two participants.

== Top goalscorers ==
Rank.	Player	Club	Goals
1	(Democratic Republic of the Congo) Andy Boyeli	Chambishi FC	16
2	(Zambia) Kennedy Musonda	Power Dynamos FC	11
3	(Zambia) Moyela Libanda	Forest Rangers FC	6
3	(Zambia) Andrew Phiri	Maestro United	6
3	(Zambia) Lubinda Mundia	Prison Leopards F.C.	6
