= 2020–21 Zambia Super League =

Zambia Super League
- Season: 2020–21
- Dates: 30 October 2020 – 27 June 2021
- Champions: ZESCO
- Matches: 306
- Goals: 646 (2.11 per match)
- Top goalscorer: Moses Phiri (17 goals)
- Biggest home win: Zanaco 6–1 Young Green Eagles
- Biggest away win: Buildcon 2–7 ZESCO United
- Highest scoring: Buildcon 2–7 ZESCO United
- Longest winning run: 9 matches ZESCO United
- Longest unbeaten run: 9 matches ZESCO United
- Longest losing run: 5 matches Kitwe United
- All statistics correct as of 16 June 2021.

The 2020–21 Zambia Super League is the 60th season of the Zambia Super League, the top-tier football league in Zambia. The league kicked off on 30 October 2020. ZESCO United are the champions. Indeni, Young Green Eagles, Kitwe United and Prison Leopards are the newly promoted sides into the super league.

== Teams ==
| TEAM | CITY | STADIUM | CAPACITY |
|---|---|---|---|
| Buildcon FC | Ndola | Levy Mwanawasa Stadium | 49800 |
| Forest Rangers FC | Ndola | Levy Mwanawasa Stadium | 49800 |
| Green Buffaloes FC | Lusaka | Independence Stadium | 30000 |
| Green Eagles FC | Lusaka | Independence Stadium | 30000 |
| Indeni FC | Ndola | Indeni Sports Complex | 1000 |
| Kabwe Warriors FC | Kabwe | Godfrey Chitalu Stadium | 10000 |
| Kitwe United FC | Kitwe | Arthur Davies Stadium | 15500 |
| Lumwana Radiants FC | Solwezi | Lumwana Football Pitch | 3000 |
| Lusaka Dynamos FC | Lusaka | Sunset Stadium | 5100 |
| NAPSA Stars FC | Lusaka | Nkoloma Stadium | 5000 |
| Nkana FC | Kitwe | Nkana Stadium | 10000 |
| Nkwazi FC | Lusaka | Edwin Imboela Stadium | 6000 |
| Power Dynamos FC | Kitwe | Arthur Davies Stadium | 15500 |
| Prison Leopards FC | Kabwe | Godfrey Chitalu Stadium | 10000 |
| Red Arrows FC | Lusaka | Nkoloma Stadium | 5000 |
| Young Green Eagles FC | Kafue | Khosa Stadium | 1000 |
| Zanaco FC | Lusaka | Sunset Stadium | 5100 |
| ZESCO United FC | Ndola | Levy Mwanawasa Stadium | 49800 |

== Standings ==
| Pos | Team | Pld | W | D | L | GF | GA | GD | Pts | Qualification or relegation |
|---|---|---|---|---|---|---|---|---|---|---|
| 1 | ZESCO United (C) | 34 | 22 | 5 | 7 | 54 | 26 | +28 | 71 | Qualification for the 2021–22 CAF Champions League |
| 2 | Zanaco | 34 | 15 | 10 | 9 | 50 | 36 | +14 | 55 | Qualification for the 2021–22 CAF Champions League |
| 3 | Red Arrows | 34 | 14 | 9 | 11 | 35 | 28 | +7 | 51 | Qualification for the 2021–22 CAF Confederation Cup |
| 4 | Kabwe Warriors | 34 | 14 | 9 | 11 | 37 | 34 | +3 | 51 | Qualification for the 2021–22 CAF Confederation Cup |
| 5 | Green Eagles | 34 | 12 | 14 | 8 | 39 | 30 | +9 | 50 | |
| 6 | Prison Leopards | 34 | 13 | 9 | 12 | 40 | 33 | +7 | 48 | |
| 7 | Lusaka Dynamos | 34 | 12 | 12 | 10 | 35 | 31 | +4 | 48 | |
| 8 | Nkwazi | 34 | 12 | 12 | 10 | 30 | 28 | +2 | 48 | |
| 9 | Green Buffaloes | 34 | 11 | 14 | 9 | 41 | 32 | +9 | 47 | |
| 10 | Power Dynamos | 34 | 12 | 11 | 11 | 29 | 26 | +3 | 47 | |
| 11 | Buildcon | 34 | 13 | 7 | 14 | 42 | 44 | −2 | 46 | |
| 12 | Forest Rangers | 34 | 11 | 12 | 11 | 36 | 35 | +1 | 45 | |
| 13 | Nkana | 34 | 13 | 6 | 15 | 42 | 46 | −4 | 45 | |
| 14 | Indeni | 34 | 9 | 14 | 11 | 39 | 43 | −4 | 41 | |
| 15 | Young Green Eagles | 34 | 9 | 13 | 12 | 23 | 38 | −15 | 40 | |
| 16 | NAPSA Stars (R) | 34 | 9 | 10 | 15 | 34 | 47 | −13 | 37 | Relegation to Zambia National League |
| 17 | Lumwana Radiants (R) | 34 | 7 | 12 | 15 | 23 | 42 | −19 | 33 | Relegation to Zambia National League |
| 18 | Kitwe United (R) | 34 | 3 | 11 | 20 | 15 | 45 | −30 | 20 | Relegation to Zambia National League |

Source: FAZ
Rules for classification: 1) points; 2) goal difference; 3) goals scored; 4) head-to-head points; 5) head-to-head goal difference
(C) Champions; (R) Relegated

== Top-scorers ==
| No. | Name | Team | Goals |
|---|---|---|---|
| 1 | Moses Phiri | Green Buffaloes | 17 |
| 2 | Friday Samu | Zanaco | 13 |
| 3 | Q. Kola | Forest Rangers | 9 |
| 4 | R. Kola | Zanaco | 8 |
| 5 | Mukeya | NAPSA Stars FC | 8 |
| 6 | D. Obash | Prison Leopards | 8 |
| 7 | Mathews Tembo | Green Eagles | 7 |
| 8 | A. Mwachiaba | Kabwe Warriors | 7 |
| 9 | Bornwell Mwape | NAPSA Stars FC | 6 |
| 10 | Brian Mwila | Buildcon FC | 6 |
| 11 | D. Kola | Young Green Eagles | 6 |
| 12 | A. Siankombo | Zanaco | 6 |
| 13 | J. Chamanga | Red Arrows | 6 |
| 14 | C. Mulenga | Indeni | 5 |
| 15 | C. Handavu | Indeni | 5 |
