= 2025–26 Zambia Super League =

Football season in Zambia

Zambia Super League
- Season: 2025–26
- Dates: 16 August 2025 – 24 May 2026
- Champions: Power Dynamos

The 2025–26 Zambia Super League was the 65th season of the Zambia Super League, the top-tier football league in Zambia, and the 20th season under the administration of the Football Association of Zambia (FAZ), in partnership with league sponsor MTN. The campaign began on 16 August 2025 and finished on 24 May 2026.

This season featured four promoted teams from the 2024–25 Zambia National Division One: Mines United F.C., Mutondo Stars F.C., Nkwazi F.C., and Nchanga Rangers F.C., replacing the relegated sides Forest Rangers, Indeni, Lumwana Radiants, and Atletico Lusaka.

Defending champions Power Dynamos defended their title, while Red Arrows finished second to qualify for the 2026–27 CAF Confederation Cup.

== Teams ==
Eighteen teams competed in the league: fourteen holdovers from the 2024–25 season and four newly promoted from the Zambia National Division One.

=== Changes from previous season ===
▲ Promoted from 2024–25 National Division One	▼ Relegated to 2025–26 National Division One
Konkola Blades; Mines United; Kansanshi Dynamos; Prison Leopards	Forest Rangers; Indeni; Lumwana Radiants; Atletico Lusaka

Note: Table lists in alphabetical order.

	Team	Location	Stadium	Capacity
1	Green Buffaloes	Lusaka	Woodlands Stadium	10,000
2	Green Eagles	Choma	Choma Independence Stadium	5,000
3	Kabwe Warriors	Kabwe	Godfrey Chitalu Stadium	15,000
4	Kansanshi Dynamos	Solwezi	Kansanshi Stadium	10,000
5	Konkola Blades	Chililabombwe	Konkola Stadium	25,000
6	Maestro United	Mazabuka	Nakambala Stadium	5,000
7	Mines United	Kabwe	President Stadium	6,000
8	Mufulira Wanderers	Mufulira	Shinde Stadium	5,000
9	Mutondo Stars	Kitwe	Levy Mwanawasa Stadium (temporary)	49,800
10	NAPSA Stars	Lusaka	Woodlands Stadium	10,000
11	Nchanga Rangers	Chingola	Nchanga Stadium	20,000
12	Nkana	Kitwe	Nkana Stadium	20,000
13	Nkwazi	Lusaka	Edwin Imboela Stadium	6,000
14	Power Dynamos	Kitwe	Arthur Davies Stadium	10,000
15	Prison Leopards	Kabwe	Godfrey Chitalu Stadium	15,000
16	Red Arrows	Lusaka	Nkoloma Stadium	5,000
17	ZESCO United	Ndola	Levy Mwanawasa Stadium	49,800
18	Zanaco	Lusaka	Sunset Stadium	10,000

== League table ==
Pos	Team	Pld	W	D	L	GF	GA	GD	Pts	Qualification or relegation
1	Power Dynamos (C)	34	23	9	2	53	18	+35	78	Qualification for the 2026–27 CAF Champions League
2	Red Arrows	34	17	12	5	44	22	+22	63	Qualification for the 2026–27 CAF Confederation Cup
3	MUZA	34	14	9	11	35	30	+5	51	
4	Kabwe Warriors	34	14	9	11	30	25	+5	51	
5	Nchanga Rangers	34	14	8	12	31	26	+5	50	
6	Green Eagles	34	13	11	10	29	25	+4	50	
7	Zanaco	34	14	8	12	30	30	0	50	
8	Mufulira Wanderers	34	14	7	13	22	25	−3	49	
9	Konkola Blades	34	11	15	8	32	28	+4	48	
10	ZESCO United	34	13	8	13	39	30	+9	47	
11	Kansanshi Dynamos	34	10	13	11	28	26	+2	43	
12	Green Buffaloes	24	9	4	11	27	34	−7	31	
13	Nkana	34	9	12	13	23	30	−7	39	
14	Nkwazi	34	8	13	13	21	28	−7	37	
15	NAPSA Stars	34	8	12	14	25	33	−8	36	
16	Mutondo Stars	34	7	14	13	23	34	−11	35	
17	Prison Leopards (R)	34	7	13	14	25	37	−12	34	Relegation to Zambia National Division One
18	Mines United (R)	34	3	9	22	19	55	−36	18	Relegation to Zambia National Division One

Source: Zambia Super League Standings
Rules for classification: 1) Points; 2) Goal difference; 3) Goals scored; 4) Head-to-head; 5) Playoff if needed
(C) Champions; (R) Relegated
