= 2021–22 Zambia Super League =

61st Zambia top-flight league season

Zambia Super League
- Season: 2021–22
- Dates: 11 September 2021 – 8 May 2022
- Champions: Red Arrows (2nd title)
- Relegated: Lusaka Dynamos; Kafue Celtic; Indeni; Konkola Blades
- CAF Champions League: Red Arrows
- CAF Confederation Cup: ZESCO United
- Matches: 306
- Goals: 592 (1.93 per match)
- Top goalscorer: Richard "Ricky" Banda (Red Arrows) (15 goals)
- Biggest home win: Buffaloes 5-0 Indeni (15 October 2021)
- Biggest away win: Kansanshi 0–5 Arrows (15 January 2022); Indeni 0–5 Dynamos (10 April 2022)
- Highest scoring: Buffaloes 2–5 Rangers (20 April 2022)

The 2021–22 Zambia Super League, known as the MTN/FAZ Super Division for sponsorship purposes, was the 61st season of the top-tier football league of Zambia which ran from 11 September 2021 to 8 May 2022.

ZESCO United were the defending champions, having won their 9th title the previous season, but they got succeeded by Red Arrows, who claimed their 2nd league title and first since 2004.

== Teams ==
The league consists of 18 teams, including 15 teams from the previous season and promoted teams, Kafue Celtic of Lusaka and Chambishi F.C.; the latter returning to the top flight after an 11-year absence.

Team	Location	Stadium	Capacity
Buildcon FC	Ndola	Levy Mwanawasa Stadium	49,800
Chambishi FC	Chambishi	Chambishi Stadium	5,000
Forest Rangers FC	Ndola	Levy Mwanawasa Stadium	49,800
Green Buffaloes FC	Lusaka	Independence Stadium	30,000
Green Eagles FC	Lusaka	Independence Stadium	30,000
Indeni FC	Ndola	Indeni Sports Complex	1,000
Kabwe Warriors FC	Kabwe	Godfrey Chitalu Stadium	10,000
Kafue Celtic FC	Kafue	Khosa Stadium	1,000
Kansanshi Dynamos FC	Solwezi	Solwezi Stadium	5,000
Konkola Blades FC	Chililabombwe	Estadio Konkola	20,000
Lusaka Dynamos FC	Lusaka	Sunset Stadium	5,100
Nkana FC	Kitwe	Nkana Stadium	10,000
Nkwazi FC	Lusaka	Edwin Imboela Stadium	6,000
Power Dynamos FC	Kitwe	Arthur Davies Stadium	15,500
Prison Leopards FC	Kabwe	Godfrey Chitalu Stadium	10,000
Red Arrows FC	Lusaka	Nkoloma Stadium	5,000
Zanaco FC	Lusaka	Sunset Stadium	5,100
ZESCO United FC	Ndola	Levy Mwanawasa Stadium	49,800

== Standings ==
Pos	Team	Pld	W	D	L	GF	GA	GD	Pts	Qualification or relegation
1	Red Arrows (C)	34	20	10	4	52	28	+24	70	Qualification for the 2022–23 CAF Champions League
2	ZESCO United	34	18	9	7	39	22	+17	63	Qualification for the 2022–23 CAF Confederation Cup
3	Green Eagles	34	14	15	5	34	22	+12	57	
4	Nkana	34	14	10	10	35	29	+6	52	
5	Power Dynamos	34	13	11	10	38	27	+11	50	
6	Zanaco	34	11	16	7	31	28	+3	49	
7	Kansanshi Dynamos	34	12	12	10	26	27	−1	48	
8	Kabwe Warriors	34	12	10	12	34	30	+4	46	
9	Prison Leopards	34	11	13	10	33	30	+3	46	
10	Buildcon	34	12	10	12	38	37	+1	46	
11	Forest Rangers	34	9	17	8	37	35	+2	44	
12	Green Buffaloes	34	11	11	12	46	46	0	44	
13	Nkwazi	34	10	8	16	25	31	−6	38	
14	Chambishi	34	10	8	16	23	38	−15	38	
15	Lusaka Dynamos (R)	34	6	13	15	27	38	−11	31	Relegation to the Zambia National League
16	Kafue Celtic (R)	34	6	13	15	27	40	−13	31	Relegation to the Zambia National League
17	Indeni (R)	34	7	10	17	20	46	−26	31	Relegation to the Zambia National League
18	Konkola Blades (R)	34	6	12	16	27	38	−11	30	Relegation to the Zambia National League

Source: Soccerway
Rules for classification: 1) points; 2) goal difference; 3) goals scored; 4) head-to-head points; 5) head-to-head goal difference
(C) Champions; (R) Relegated

== Results ==
Home \ Away	BUI	BUF	CEL	CHA	EAG	FOR	IND	KAB	KAN	KON	LUS	NKA	NKW	POW	PRI	RED	ZAN	ZES
Buildcon	—	1–2	0–1	2–0	2–0	2–0	1–0	1–1	0–1	2–1	3–1	1–2	0–0	0–0	1–0	0–0	2–0	2–3
Green Buffaloes	2–3	—	1–1	3–0	1–2	2–5	5–0	2–1	0–0	2–1	1–1	1–1	0–1	1–3	3–3	2–3	2–0	0–3
Kafue Celtic	1–1	0–1	—	0–0	1–1	2–2	1–2	0–1	1–0	1–0	0–1	0–1	3–1	1–0	1–1	0–1	0–1	2–0
Chambishi	2–1	0–2	2–1	—	0–1	1–1	1–1	2–2	0–0	0–1	2–1	1–0	1–0	2–3	2–0	0–2	0–1	0–1
Green Eagles	1–2	2–0	2–2	1–0	—	0–0	0–0	1–2	1–0	2–0	0–0	0–0	2–1	0–0	2–0	2–0	0–0	0–0
Forest Rangers	1–2	2–2	4–1	2–0	1–1	—	2–1	1–1	1–0	1–1	0–0	1–1	1–0	0–0	0–0	1–2	0–2	0–1
Indeni	1–1	1–2	2–1	1–0	0–0	1–0	—	0–0	0–1	1–1	0–3	1–1	0–2	0–5	0–1	1–3	1–0	0–2
Kabwe Warriors	2–0	1–0	2–0	0–1	1–2	1–1	1–1	—	0–0	2–1	2–0	0–1	2–0	1–0	2–0	1–1	1–2	0–2
Kansanshi Dynamos	0–0	1–0	3–2	0–0	0–0	1–2	1–2	1–0	—	1–0	1–0	1–0	0–0	1–1	1–1	0–5	1–1	2–0
Konkola Blades	2–2	0–0	3–0	0–0	1–2	0–1	2–1	0–2	0–2	—	2–0	1–1	0–1	1–0	1–2	1–1	1–1	1–1
Lusaka Dynamos	1–1	1–1	1–1	1–1	0–1	3–1	2–0	3–2	0–1	0–0	—	2–2	0–3	1–1	1–0	0–1	0–0	0–1
Nkana	2–0	2–2	2–0	0–1	2–2	2–0	1–0	1–0	0–0	1–0	2–1	—	2–3	2–0	0–2	1–0	1–1	1–0
Nkwazi	0–1	0–1	0–0	0–1	0–0	1–1	0–1	0–1	1–0	1–1	2–2	0–2	—	1–0	2–1	2–3	2–0	0–0
Power Dynamos	2–0	2–1	0–0	0–1	1–2	1–2	3–0	2–0	2–1	1–0	1–0	1–0	1–0	—	0–0	0–0	3–3	0–0
Prison Leopards	2–1	2–0	0–0	2–1	3–1	1–1	1–1	0–0	1–1	2–0	3–1	1–0	0–1	2–1	—	0–1	0–0	0–1
Red Arrows	3–1	1–2	2–2	4–1	1–0	1–1	0–0	1–0	0–3	2–2	1–0	3–0	1–0	1–1	2–1	—	1–1	1–0
Zanaco	1–1	1–1	1–0	2–0	1–1	0–0	1–0	2–2	2–1	0–2	0–0	1–0	2–0	2–1	0–0	1–2	—	1–1
ZESCO United	2–1	1–1	1–1	2–0	0–2	1–1	1–0	1–0	4–0	2–0	1–0	2–1	1–0	1–2	1–1	1–2	1–0	—

Updated to match(es) played on 08 May 2022. Source: Soccerway
Legend: Blue = home team win; Yellow = draw; Red = away team win.
For upcoming matches, an "a" indicates there is an article about the rivalry between the two participants.
