= 2023–24 Zambia Super League =

Zambia Super League
- Season: 2023–24
- Dates: 18 August 2023 – 18 May 2024
- Champions: Red Arrows 3rd Super League title
- Relegated: Trident; Kansanshi Dynamos; Prison Leopards; Konkola Blades
- CAF Champions League: Red Arrows
- CAF Confederation Cup: ZESCO United
- Matches: 306
- Goals: 571 (1.87 per match)
- Top goalscorer: Freddy Michael (11 goals)
- Biggest home win: Power Dynamos 5–0 Nkwazi; Mufulira Wanderers 5–0 Konkola Blades
- Biggest away win: Green Eagles 0–4 Prison Leopards; Green Eagles 0–4 Red Arrows
- Highest scoring: Green Eagles 3–4 Trident
- Longest winning run: Power Dynamos with 5 wins
- Longest unbeaten run: ZESCO United with 7 matches
- Longest winless run: Nkana with 8 matches
- Longest losing run: Trident with 5 losses
- Average attendance: 1,263
- All statistics correct as of 19 May 2024.

The 2023–24 Zambia Super League, known as the MTN Super League for sponsorship purposes, was the 63rd season of the top-tier association football league in Zambia, which began on 18 August 2023. Power Dynamos are the defending champions. Red Arrows were crowned champions this was the third title.

== League table ==
| Pos | Team | Pld | W | D | L | GF | GA | GD | Pts | Qualification or relegation |
|---|---|---|---|---|---|---|---|---|---|---|
| 1 | Red Arrows (C) | 34 | 21 | 8 | 5 | 45 | 16 | +29 | 71 | Qualification for CAF Champions League |
| 2 | ZESCO United | 34 | 15 | 14 | 5 | 46 | 30 | +16 | 59 | Qualification for CAF Confederation Cup |
| 3 | Power Dynamos | 34 | 14 | 14 | 6 | 43 | 24 | +19 | 56 | |
| 4 | Muza | 34 | 14 | 11 | 9 | 38 | 30 | +8 | 53 | |
| 5 | Nkwazi | 34 | 14 | 10 | 10 | 33 | 35 | −2 | 52 | |
| 6 | Kabwe Warriors | 34 | 14 | 10 | 10 | 33 | 26 | +7 | 52 | |
| 7 | Mufulira Wanderers | 34 | 11 | 10 | 13 | 32 | 32 | 0 | 43 | |
| 8 | Zanaco | 34 | 9 | 16 | 9 | 27 | 30 | −3 | 43 | |
| 9 | Nkana | 34 | 11 | 10 | 13 | 24 | 30 | −6 | 43 | |
| 10 | Forest Rangers | 34 | 9 | 15 | 10 | 33 | 34 | −1 | 42 | |
| 11 | Green Buffaloes | 34 | 10 | 12 | 12 | 31 | 35 | −4 | 42 | |
| 12 | Green Eagles | 34 | 11 | 9 | 14 | 35 | 41 | −6 | 42 | |
| 13 | Mutondo Stars | 34 | 11 | 7 | 16 | 30 | 33 | −3 | 40 | |
| 14 | Napsa Stars | 34 | 9 | 13 | 12 | 26 | 30 | −4 | 40 | |
| 15 | Konkola Blades (R) | 34 | 8 | 15 | 11 | 23 | 31 | −8 | 39 | Relegation to Zambian Division One |
| 16 | Prison Leopards (R) | 34 | 8 | 11 | 15 | 26 | 37 | −11 | 35 | Relegation to Zambian Division One |
| 17 | Kansanshi Dynamos (R) | 34 | 8 | 11 | 15 | 23 | 36 | −13 | 35 | Relegation to Zambian Division One |
| 18 | Trident (R) | 34 | 4 | 14 | 16 | 26 | 44 | −18 | 26 | Relegation to Zambian Division One |

Source: ESPN
Rules for classification: 1) points; 2) goal difference; 3) goals scored; 4) head-to-head points; 5) head-to-head goal difference
(C) Champions; (R) Relegated

== Results ==
| Home \ Away | FOR | BUF | EAG | KAB | KAN | KON | MUF | MUT | MUZ | NAP | NKA | NKW | POW | PRI | RED | TRI | ZAN | ZES |
|---|---|---|---|---|---|---|---|---|---|---|---|---|---|---|---|---|---|---|
| Forest Rangers | — | 2–0 | 1–1 | 1–0 | 1 Jun | 0–0 | 1–0 | 2–1 | 0–1 | 1–0 | 1–0 | 1–2 | 1–0 | 1–1 | 0–0 | 1–1 | 1–1 | 0–0 |
| Green Buffaloes | 26 May | — | 2–0 | 1–0 | 1–1 | 4–2 | 2–1 | 0–0 | 1–1 | 2–1 | 0–0 | 0–0 | 3–1 | 1–1 | 0–0 | 2–0 | 1–0 | 0–1 |
| Green Eagles | 2–1 | 1–3 | — | 1–1 | 4–1 | 0–1 | 0–0 | 0–0 | 0–4 | 3–0 | 1–0 | 0–1 | 0–4 | 4–0 | 25 May | 2–2 | 0–1 | 1–1 |
| Kabwe Warriors | 1–0 | 3–0 | 0–1 | — | 2–1 | 1–0 | 2–3 | 0–2 | 0–0 | 1–1 | 26 May | 1–1 | 2–0 | 0–0 | 1–0 | 2–1 | 0–1 | 0–0 |
| Kansanshi Dynamos | 0–0 | 0–0 | 0–2 | 2–0 | — | 0–1 | 0–0 | 1–0 | 26 May | 1–0 | 0–0 | 1–1 | 0–1 | 2–1 | 2–1 | 2–1 | 2–1 | 1–1 |
| Konkola Blades | 1–1 | 1–1 | 0–0 | 0–2 | 1–0 | — | 2–0 | 0–0 | 2–0 | 25 May | 1–2 | 2–1 | 0–0 | 1–1 | 1–1 | 0–1 | 0–0 | 1–1 |
| Mufulira Wanderers | 1–1 | 1–0 | 0–1 | 2–2 | 0–0 | 1–0 | — | 0–0 | 0–2 | 2–1 | 2–1 | 1–1 | 1–3 | 2–0 | 1–0 | 0–1 | 5–0 | 1 Jun |
| Mutondo Stars | 3–2 | 3–0 | 1–2 | 1–1 | 2–0 | 0–1 | 2–1 | — | 0–1 | 3–0 | 1–0 | 0–1 | 0–1 | 3–2 | 1 Jun | 0–1 | 1–0 | 1–2 |
| Muza | 2–2 | 0–0 | 1–0 | 1 Jun | 1–0 | 0–0 | 1–0 | 2–0 | — | 1–0 | 0–1 | ~~24 Apr~~ | 3–2 | 2–0 | 1–4 | 1–0 | 1–1 | 1–3 |
| Napsa Stars | 1–0 | 2–1 | 1–0 | 1–0 | 0–0 | 0–0 | 1–1 | 3–2 | 1–1 | — | 1–0 | 1–2 | 1 Jun | 1–0 | 0–1 | 0–0 | 3–0 | 0–1 |
| Nkana | 1–1 | 2–1 | 0–2 | 0–1 | 1–0 | 2–1 | 2–1 | 2–1 | 1–1 | 1–1 | — | 1–3 | 0–2 | 0–0 | 0–1 | 0–0 | 1 Jun | 0–0 |
| Nkwazi | 1–1 | 2–1 | 1 Jun | 1–0 | 0–0 | 1–0 | 0–1 | 2–0 | 2–1 | 0–2 | 0–0 | — | 0–3 | 25 May | 0–1 | 1–1 | 1–1 | 1–0 |
| Power Dynamos | 5–0 | 1–0 | 2–0 | 0–0 | 3–1 | 1–1 | 26 May | 2–0 | 1–1 | 1–1 | 0–2 | 2–1 | — | 1–0 | 0–1 | 0–0 | 1–1 | 2–2 |
| Prison Leopards | 2–1 | 1–0 | 2–0 | 1–2 | 2–1 | 1 Jun | 2–0 | 0–1 | 3–2 | 0–0 | 0–1 | 0–1 | 0–0 | — | 1–2 | 1–1 | 0–1 | 1–0 |
| Red Arrows | 2–0 | 4–1 | 1–2 | 1–1 | 1–0 | 2–0 | 0–0 | 3–1 | 1–1 | 1–0 | 1–0 | 4–0 | 1–1 | 2–0 | — | 2–0 | 1–0 | 2–0 |
| Trident | 1–3 | 1 Jun | 4–1 | 0–1 | 1–1 | 0–0 | 1–2 | 0–0 | 0–1 | 1–1 | 1–2 | 1–3 | 0–0 | 1–1 | 0–1 | — | 0–2 | 2–3 |
| Zanaco | 1–1 | 1–1 | 1–1 | 2–1 | 1–0 | 3–0 | 1–0 | 26 May | 0–0 | 0–0 | 0–1 | 1–1 | 0–0 | 0–0 | 1–2 | 2–1 | — | 1–1 |
| ZESCO United | 1–1 | 1–0 | 3–2 | 1–2 | 2–1 | 3–0 | 1–1 | 0–0 | 2–1 | 1–0 | 3–1 | 2–0 | 1–1 | 1–1 | 1–0 | 26 May | 2–2 | — |

Updated to match(es) played on 19 May 2024. Source: BetExplorer
Legend: Blue = home team win; Yellow = draw; Red = away team win.
For upcoming matches, an "a" indicates there is an article about the rivalry between the two participants.

== Top goalscorers ==
| Rank | Player | Team | Goals |
|---|---|---|---|
| 1. | Michael F. | Green Eagles | 11 |
| 1. | Phiri A. | MUZA | 11 |
| 3. | Banda R. | Red Arrows | 10 |
| 4. | Biyeta C. | Mufulira | 8 |
| 4. | Boyeli A. | Power Dynamos | 8 |
| 4. | Mutale J. | Power Dynamos | 8 |
| 4. | Ngoma G. | Green Buffaloes | 8 |
| 4. | Saddam Y. | Red Arrows | 8 |
| 9. | Chansa T. | Mutondo Stars | 7 |
| 9. | Mushure O. | Kabwe | 7 |
| 9. | Muwowo A. | Power Dynamos | 7 |
| 9. | Sakala E. | ZESCO | 7 |
| 9. | Zulu C. | Zanaco | 7 |
| 14. | Daka D. | Kansanshi | 6 |
| 14. | Mashata G. | Green Buffaloes | 6 |
| 14. | Mashimikilo M. | Nkwazi | 6 |
| 14. | Obashi D. | Prison Leopards | 6 |
| 18. | Chishimba l. | Forest Rangers | 5 |
| 18. | Kambole L. | ZESCO | 5 |
| 18. | Katema P. | Red Arrows | 5 |
| 18. | Kola Q. | Forest Rangers | 5 |
| 18. | Lungu D. | Mutondo Stars | 5 |
| 18. | Mutama S. | Nkwazi | 5 |
| 18. | Mwamba M. | Kabwe | 5 |
| 18. | Ngulube J. | Nkana | 5 |
| 18. | Ngwenya G. | Power Dynamos | 5 |
| 18. | Sondashi C. | MUZA | 5 |

== Attendances ==
| # | Football club | Average attendance |
|---|---|---|
| 1 | Mufulira Wanderers | 5,118 |
| 2 | Konkola Blades | 3,705 |
| 3 | Power Dynamos | 2,515 |
| 4 | ZESCO United | 2,234 |
| 5 | Nkana FC | 1,215 |
| 6 | Kabwe Warriors | 974 |
| 7 | Forest Rangers | 904 |
| 8 | Kansanshi Dynamos | 572 |
| 9 | Maestro United Zambia | 540 |
| 10 | Prison Leopards | 540 |
| 11 | Green Buffaloes | 536 |
| 12 | Trident FC | 516 |
| 13 | Green Eagles | 506 |
| 14 | Red Arrows FC | 505 |
| 15 | Zanaco FC | 499 |
| 16 | Nkwazi FC | 480 |
| 17 | Mutondo Stars | 464 |
| 18 | NAPSA Stars | 430 |
