= Zambian Division One =

Zambian Second Division
- Founded: 1975
- Country: Zambia
- Confederation: CAF
- Number of clubs: 64
- Level on pyramid: 4 Zones
- Relegation to: Zambian Third Division
- Domestic cup: Barclays Cup
- International cup(s): Champions League; Confederation Cup

The Zambian Division One, commonly referred to as Division One, was formerly the second tier of the football league system under the Football Association of Zambia (FAZ). It consisted of sixty-four teams, geographically split into four regional zones as follows:

- Zone One covering Lusaka and Eastern Provinces
- Zone Two covering Copperbelt, North-Western and Luapula Provinces
- Zone Three covering Muchinga, Central and Northern Provinces
- Zone Four covering Southern and Western Provinces

Before the 2019–20 season, the national league system was restructured and the FAZ adopted the CAF season calendar, aligning the competition schedule with that used across African club competitions. Following this reform, Division One was replaced as the second tier by the newly created Zambia National League.

== List of champions ==
Season	North	South
2009	Nchanga Rangers	National Assembly
2010	Kalewa	Nakambala Leopards
2011	Indeni	Profund Warriors
2012	Lime Hotspurs	Kabwe Warriors
2013	National Assembly	Green Eagles
2014	Forest Rangers	Lusaka Dynamos
2015	Lumwana Radiants	Kabwe Warriors

Season	Zone One	Zone Two	Zone Three	Zone Four
2016	City of Lusaka	Konkola Blades	Real Nakonde	AM Welding
2017	National Assembly	Kitwe United	Kabwe Youth Soccer Academy	New Monze Swallows
2018	Circuit City	Mufulira Wanderers	Prison Leopards	MUZA
2019	National Assembly	Kansanshi Dynamos	Kabwe Youth Soccer Academy	Young Green Eagles
