= James Chamanga =

Zambian footballer (born 1980)

Personal information
- Date of birth: 2 February 1980 (age 46)
- Place of birth: Luanshya, Zambia
- Height: 1.82 m (6 ft 0 in)
- Position: Striker

Senior career*
Years	Team	Apps	(Gls)
2000–2002	Makumbi Stars		
2002–2003	City of Lusaka		
2003–2004	National Assembly		
2005	→ Zanaco (loan)	27	(10)
2005–2006	Bush Bucks	24	(7)
2006–2007	Supersport United	23	(8)
2007–2008	Moroka Swallows	21	(14)
2008–2012	Dalian Shide	121	(30)
2013–2018	Liaoning Whowin	102	(41)
2019–2025	Red Arrows		
Total		318	(110)

International career
2005–2015	Zambia	58	(17)
- * Club domestic league appearances and goals

James Chamanga (born 2 February 1980) is a Zambian former professional footballer who played as a striker.

== Club career ==
Chamanga's goal against the South Africa national team earned him his first move abroad as the then South African Premier Soccer League side Bush Bucks signed him in 2005. After Bush Bucks were relegated in 2006, he signed with Supersport United where he was the club's top goalscorer for the 2006–07 season.

Chamanga scored a record-breaking five goals for Swallows in a 6–2 league win against Platinum Stars on 9 December 2007. This included a hat-trick between the 20th and the 24th minute.

In April 2008, Chamanga moved to Chinese Super League club Dalian Shide, after he scored 14 goals in ABSA Premier League for Moroka Swallows in the previous season.

On 6 May 2012, Chamanga made his 100th league appearance for Dalian in a 4–1 home win against Tianjin Teda. He scored a hat-trick in this match.

He scored 14 goals for Liaoning Whowin in 2016 Chinese Super League, tied second on the scorers' ranking table. He renewed his contract with Liaoning Whowin until 2018.

Chamanga suffered serious shoulder injuriy and fractured ribs when challenging for a header during the match against Guizhou Hengfeng on 8 July 2017, but he recovered and decided to stay with team after its relegation to the China League One.

On 6 July 2018, Liaoning Whowin announced that Chamanga would no longer playing for the team, but would participate in team management instead, indicating his retirement.

At the end of March 2019, Chamanga came out of retirement and signed a three-month contract with Red Arrows in Zambia.

== International career ==
Chamanga made his international debut on 26 February 2005 against Botswana and five months later he scored his first international goal in the COSAFA Cup semifinal against South Africa.

He was part of the Zambian 2006 African Nations Cup team which finished third in group C in the first round of competition, thus failing to secure qualification for the quarter-finals. He netted Zambia's opener against Sudan (2008 African Nations Cup) in the Chipolopolo's 3–0 win. Chamanga also scored Zambia's first goal at the 2006 African Nations Cup against Tunisia.

== Career statistics ==
=== Club ===
Appearances and goals by club, season and competition
Club	Season	League			National cup		League cup		Continental		Total	
Club	Season	Division	Apps	Goals	Apps	Goals	Apps	Goals	Apps	Goals	Apps	Goals
Zanaco (loan)	2005	Zambian Premier League	27	10	0	0	—		—		27	10
Bush Bucks	2005–06	South African Premiership	24	7	0	0	—		—		23	8
SuperSport United	2006–07	South African Premiership	23	8	0	0	—		—		23	8
Moroka Swallows	2007–08	South African Premiership	21	14	0	0	—		—		21	14
Dalian Shide	2008	Chinese Super League	18	4	—		—		—		18	4
Dalian Shide	2009	Chinese Super League	25	5	—		—		—		25	5
Dalian Shide	2010	Chinese Super League	28	9	—		—		—		28	9
Dalian Shide	2011	Chinese Super League	22	2	0	0	—		—		22	2
Dalian Shide	2012	Chinese Super League	28	10	0	0	—		—		28	10
Dalian Shide	Total		121	30	0	0	—		—		121	30
Liaoning Whowin	2013	Chinese Super League	25	9	2	0	—		—		27	9
Liaoning Whowin	2014	Chinese Super League	23	11	0	0	—		—		23	11
Liaoning Whowin	2015	Chinese Super League	6	2	0	0	—		—		6	2
Liaoning Whowin	2016	Chinese Super League	28	14	0	0	—		—		28	14
Liaoning Whowin	2017	Chinese Super League	14	5	0	0	—		—		14	5
Liaoning Whowin	2018	China League One	6	0	0	0	—		—		6	0
Liaoning Whowin	Total		102	41	2	0	—		—		104	41
Red Arrows	2019–20	Zambian Super League			—		—		—		18	4
Red Arrows	2020–21	Zambian Super League			—		—		—		5	1
Red Arrows	2020–21	Zambian Super League			—		—		—		5	1
Red Arrows	2021–22	Zambian Super League			—		5	1	—		5	1
Red Arrows	2022–23	Zambian Super League			—		1	0	—		1	0
Red Arrows	2023–24	Zambian Super League			—		—		—		1	0
Red Arrows	2024–25	Zambian Super League			—		2	0	—		1	0
Red Arrows	Total				—		8	1	—		8	1
Career total			318	110	2	0	8	1	0	0	328	111

=== International ===
Appearances and goals by national team and year
National team	Year	Apps	Goals
Zambia	2005	3	1
Zambia	2006	8	3
Zambia	2007	4	0
Zambia	2008	10	1
Zambia	2009	6	6
Zambia	2010	7	3
Zambia	2011	5	2
Zambia	2012	9	1
Zambia	2013	4	0
Zambia	2014	1	0
Zambia	2015	1	0
Total		58	17

Scores and results list Zambia's goal tally first, score column indicates score after each Chamanga goal.

List of international goals scored by James Chamanga
No.	Date	Venue	Opponent	Score	Result	Competition
1	13 August 2005	Mafikeng, South Africa	South Africa	1–0	2–2 (9–8 p)	2005 COSAFA Cup
2	22 January 2006	Alexandria, Egypt	Tunisia	1–0	1–4	2006 Africa Cup of Nations
3	23 July 2006	Windhoek, Namibia	Seychelles	1–0	2–0	2006 COSAFA Cup
4	3 September 2006	N'Djamena, Chad	Chad	1–0	2–0	2008 Africa Cup of Nations qualification
5	22 January 2008	Kumasi, Ghana	Sudan	1–0	3–0	2008 Africa Cup of Nations
6	21 November 2009	Lusaka, Zambia	North Korea	1–0	4–1	Friendly
7	21 November 2009	Lusaka, Zambia	North Korea	2–0	4–1	Friendly
8	21 November 2009	Lusaka, Zambia	North Korea	3–0	4–1	Friendly
9	21 January 2010	Benguela, Angola	Gabon	2–0	2–1	2010 Africa Cup of Nations
10	5 September 2010	Chililabombwe, Zambia	Comoros	3–0	4–0	2012 Africa Cup of Nations qualification
11	27 March 2011	Maputo, Mozambique	Mozambique	1–0	2–0	2012 Africa Cup of Nations qualification
12	4 February 2012	Bata, Equatorial Guinea	Sudan	3–0	3–0	2012 Africa Cup of Nations

== Honours ==
Zambia

- Africa Cup of Nations: 2012
