= Patrick Phiri =

Zambian footballer and coach (born 1956)

Personal information
- Date of birth: 3 May 1956 (age 70)
- Place of birth: Luanshya, Northern Rhodesia
- Position: Forward

Team information
- Current team: Lumwana Radiants (Manager)

Senior career*
Years	Team	Apps	(Gls)
1973–1974	Buseko FC		
1974–1975	Rokana United		(21)
1975–1986	Red Arrows		

International career
1976–1982	Zambia		

Managerial career
- 1986–1991: Red Arrows
- 1992–1994: Ndeke Rangers
- 1995–1997: Lusaka Dynamos
- 1997: Mochudi Centre Chiefs
- 1997–2002: Nkana F.C.
- 2002–2003: Zambia
- 2003–2005: Simba
- 2006–2008: Zambia
- 2008–2011: Simba
- 2012: NAPSA Stars
- 2013–2014: Green Buffaloes
- 2014–2015: Simba
- 2015–2016: Nakambala Leopards
- 2016–2017: Forest Rangers
- 2017–2018: Lusaka Dynamos
- 2018–2019: Nakambala Leopards
- 2019–: Lumwana Radiants
- * Club domestic league appearances and goals

Patrick Phiri (born 3 May 1956) is a Zambian football coach and former footballer. He featured for Zambian clubs Rokana United and Red Arrows as a striker and represented Zambia at the 1978 and 1982 African Cup of Nations tournaments. As a coach, Phiri led the Zambia U-20 national team to its first ever appearance at the 1999 FIFA World Youth Championship in Nigeria and was voted Zambian Coach of the Year at the end of the year. He was also in charge of Zambia at the 2008 African Cup of Nations in Ghana and has managed ten different club sides, with three of them more than once. He is currently in charge of Lumwana Radiants in the Zambian Premier League.

== Early life ==
Phiri was born in Luanshya's Mpatamatu township where his father Ackson Phiri was a miner. He was the fifth born in a family of three boys and four girls and went to Mpatamatu and Mwaiseni Primary Schools and later attended Mpatamatu Secondary. Not only was he a keen student but he excelled on the football pitch as well.

== Playing career ==
While still at primary school and barely into his teens, Phiri began following his two elder brothers to training sessions at Luanshya amateur side Buseko FC. At times, he would be asked to join in the sessions to make up the numbers. He was too young to play for the team in actual matches but the exposure at an early age made him better than his age-mates. Phiri began featuring for Buseko in 1973 and stayed with the team for two seasons until he was lured to Division I side Rokana United in 1974 by Zambian international star Bernard 'Bomber' Chanda, who also started his career at Buseko and at the time was courting Phiri's immediate elder sister Louisa whom he ended up marrying.

After a spell in the reserves, Phiri was promoted to the first team the following year and he made an immediate impact, more than holding his own among players like Chanda, Stone Chibwe, Brighton Sinyangwe, Moses Simwala and Mark Masumbuko. Sporting an afro hair-style like his brother-in-law, the teenager was Rokana's top scorer with 21 goals. One of the highlights of his season was a brace against Mufulira Wanderers in a 3–0 victory at Rokana's home ground Scrivener Stadium.

The skilful forward caught the eye of second division football club Zambia Air Force (ZAF) Football Club (later renamed Red Arrows) who enticed him to join them towards the end of the season, together with other Rokana players Johnston Katowando, Shadreck Chungu, and Bernard 'Tools' Mutale who had moved earlier in July. This caused some friction between the two clubs, but it proved to be a shrewd move as the team clinched the Division II title and won promotion to the top league.

At ZAF, he linked up with players like Ghost Mulenga, Aaron Njovu, Martin Besa, System Chilongo, Sandra Phiri, Fanny Hangunyu and John Zyambo and helped transform Arrows into a formidable outfit. He earned the nickname 'The Mathematician' in reference to his calculated passes and clinical finishing. He won the Heroes and Unity Cup in 1977 and 1979, and scored twice in the BP Shell Challenge Cup final, a 5–0 thrashing of Green Buffaloes in 1982. He also won the Champion of Champions cup in 1983 when Arrows beat favourites Power Dynamos by three goals to two in Ndola.

In July 1986, Arrows coach Boniface Simutowe was relieved of his duties after a poor run of results and Phiri was appointed player- coach. He continued picking himself for the rest of the season after which he retired to concentrate on coaching the team.

== National team ==
Phiri's performances at Arrows earned him a call-up to the national team under Ante Buselic at the age of 20, as Zambia prepared for the 1976 Montreal Olympics which Zambia pulled out of for political reasons. He scored on his debut, getting the winning goal when Zambia beat Botswana 3–2 in Gaborone to celebrate that country's independence in September of that year. He also featured at 1976 East and Central Africa (ECA) tournament in Zanzibar, making a substitute appearance in the final which Zambia lost to Uganda 2–0, and at the 1977 East and Central Africa where Zambia once again lost to Uganda but this time on penalties.

He was part of Brian Tiler's squad at CAN 1978 and scored the first goal in Zambia's 2–0 victory over Upper Volta. Unfortunately, Zambia bowed out in the group stage after losing to eventual winners Ghana and drawing with and Nigeria.

Phiri also featured prominently at CAN 1982 where he played his last game for Zambia.

== Coaching career ==
In 1986, Arrows went on a poor run and at the half-way stage, were rooted to the bottom of the 12 team table with 7 points from 11 matches, a situation which saw their fans riot in protest. The team's executive acted swiftly by appointing Phiri as player-coach, replacing Simutowe. Arrows performances improved under Phiri and they survived relegation at the end of the season. Phiri disclosed that he found being player-coach the best way to coach, as he was involved in the action on the pitch and could easily pass on instructions to other players. That same year, he was sent to West Germany for a basic coaching course.

The following season which spilled into the following year due to a dispute over an unfulfilled fixture involving Kabwe Warriors which went as far as the courts, Arrows took the league by storm, leading the table for a large part of the season and eventually finishing third, three points behind champions Warriors but scoring more goals than any other team.

He got his intermediate certificate in 1989 in Germany in 1991, the changing economic climate saw Arrows being demoted to Division I and the ZAF top brass made the decision to disband the team. Phiri therefore joined Zambia Airways sponsored FAZ Division I side Ndeke Rangers in 1992 which also went under following the liquidation of the national airline in 1994. Phiri found himself at Queensmead Stadium in 1994 first as Obby Kapita's assistant at Lusaka Dynamos before taking over the reins in 1995 and took them to second place on the Super Division log – their best performance ever. It was during this time that he doubled as head coach of the Under-20 national team and won the regional COSAFA Cup in Botswana. While in Gaborone, he made contact with Mochudi Centre Chiefs who offered him a job in 1997. However, he had managed to qualify the team to the Under-20 African Youth Championship in Morocco so FAZ recalled him after six months to take the team to North Africa where Zambia bowed out in the group stages.

On his return from Morocco, he was asked to take over at former club Nkana who had not won the league since 1992. Phiri obliged by turning the side into champions, with players such as Gift Kampamba, Freddie Mwila Jnr, and Emmanuel Msichili among others. He won two Super Division titles, the Mosi Cup and the BP Top 8 Cup three times in a row.

After a splendid performance at the African Youth Championship finals in Ghana where Zambia reached the semi-finals, Phiri made history by becoming the first Zambian coach to take the Under-20 side to the World Youth Cup where they beat Honduras 4–3, drew with Spain 1–1 but lost to Brazil 5–1 after taking an early lead.

He was appointed assistant coach to Ben Bamfuchile at the under-23 national team and the two took the team to the 1999 All Africa Games in South Africa where Zambia reached the final and they lost 1–0 to Cameroon. Following Zambia's poor showing at CAN 2002 where they were eliminated in the first round, the FAZ entrusted Phiri with the task of taking Zambia to Tunisia 2004 and he took over from Roald Poulsen who had taken temporary charge of the team when previous full-time coach Jan Brouwer was banned from the 2002 tournament by the Confederation of African Football (CAF).

Phiri made a winning start with a 3–0 COSAFA Cup win over Mozambique in Lusaka but Zambia lost to Malawi 1–0 in the next round of the same competition. Zambia then kicked off their CAN 2004 qualification campaign with a 1–0 away win to Sudan but two home draws against Benin and Sudan meant Zambia travelled to Cotonou needing a draw to progress to Tunisia. It was a trip fraught with difficulties.

When Zambia arrived in the West African country, their hosts had only arranged transportation for the players so the coaching and administrative staff had to hire scooters to ferry them to the hotel, which turned out to be sub-standard. Zambia turned up on match day in front of a packed stadium. With Benin hell-bent on qualifying to their first ever CAN tournament by any means, the team was urinated on by spectators who were above the walkway to the dressing room. On their way to the pitch, fans poured a white substance on the Zambian players which turned out to be itching powder, and also showered them with missiles so a number of them were injured and had to be attended to while the national anthems were being played. Some players wanted to boycott the match but Phiri reckoned that they would suffer a worse fate from the hostile crowd and convinced the players to carry on, that the important thing was to play the match and depart in one piece. The team's Administrative Manager Solly Pandor was detained at gunpoint by Benin authorities and did not even sit on the bench with his colleagues. Zambia lost 3–0 to goals by Omar Tchomogo who struck twice, and Moussa Latoundji and failed to qualify to a CAN tournament for the first time since 1988. Phiri accepted the blame though he did not like the reaction from the fans and administrators considering that the match was not played under normal sporting conditions, which he described as his 'worst experience in football.'

Although the FAZ appealed to the CAF, the continental soccer body only fined Benin a paltry amount and allowed them to proceed to the finals. He continued as coach but only for two games more for when Zambia lost a COSAFA Cup semi-final to Malawi on penalties in Blantyre, Phiri was fired and replaced by Kalusha Bwalya. In 15 games, he won 6, drew 6 and lost 3.

Phiri then Took charge of Tanzanian side Simba and won the league in 2004–5. }[bt] Phiri later resigned citing personal reasons before returning briefly in 2005 in a caretaker role following the resignation of South Africa Trott Moloto.

Zambia disappointed yet again at CAN 2006, exiting at the group stage after losing the first two games to Tunisia and Guinea before restoring some pride in the southern African derby against South Africa. When Bwalya resigned, the FAZ settled for Phiri once again and this time he had a much more successful stint as Chipolopolo coach. He led Zambia to the COSAFA Cup final in 2006, and when Zambia hosted favourites and three-time champions Angola in Lusaka, Zambia gave them no chance to settle, attacking from the first whistle and carried the day 2–0 through goals by Dube Phiri and Chaswe Nsofwa to win their third COSAFA trophy. The following year, Zambia then travelled to South Africa for a final CAN qualifying win needing an outright win to qualify having lost the home match 1–0 on an Aaron Mokoena goal. This time, Phiri delivered as Zambia shocked South Africa in Cape Town 3–1, thanks to a 20-minute hat-trick by Christopher Katongo and won the group despite tying on points, thanks to a better head-to-head record. The result left the Bafana Bafana coach Carlos Alberto Parreira shell-shocked.

After the defeat, the South Africans showed a misunderstanding of the rules by claiming that they had won their group due to their better goal difference and it was later clarified that their qualification was by virtue of being one of the three best-second placed teams. This same misinterpretation of the rules would come back to haunt them four years later but this time, with devastating consequences as they missed out on CAN 2012 completely.

Phiri who completed his coaching A licence in 2007 was not done as he led Zambia to a CECAFA cup victory in Ethiopia in November of that year and Zambia intensified preparations for CAN 2008. Preparations for the tournament were overshadowed by a power struggle in the FAZ. Phiri named his CAN team and left out star striker Collins Mbesuma who was unfit and when the team left for Tunisia, star defender Elijah Tana missed the flight to Ghana so Phiri had to decide whether to include him or replace him with someone else. However, the decision appeared to have been taken out of his hands by his boss FAZ President Teddy Mulonga who labelled Tana indisciplined and said he would leave it up to the coach to decide but if it were up to him, he would have dropped Tana from the team.

Although Tana was allowed to join up with the team, he was not on the final list of players submitted to the CAF and he consequently flew back home, infuriated by his futile trip. He called on politicians masquerading as football administrators to quit and said the decision by FAZ to fly him all the way to Ghana when they knew he was not part of the final team was 'rubbish.'

Without his star striker and his key defender, Phiri led the Chipolopolo to a 3–0 win over Sudan in the first game but a 5–1 debacle to Cameroun which was characterised by schoolboy defensive errors, put paid to Zambia's hopes of progressing from the group. A credible 1–1 draw in the last group match against Egypt was not enough to prevent Zambia bowing out. Soon after, Phiri was replaced by Herve Renard.

He returned to Nkana but left to rejoin Simba in January 2009, winning the league again in 2009/10 without losing a single game. The following season, Simba failed to retain the league title and finished second to bitter rivals Young Africans on just a single goal's difference. This was not enough and he was relieved of his duties in April 2011. Despite club officials pointing the finger at him for failing to retain the title, he was voted Vodacom premier League coach of the year for 2010/2011.

When the management of Zambian Premier League Promotion side NAPSA Stars (formerly Profund Warriors) approached Phiri, their vision for the club appealed to him and he signed up as coach with Peter Kaumba as his assistant. After a promising start, the team went through a rough patch after the mid-season break and with the team two places above the relegation sone, Phiri was fired, becoming the twelfth coach to be dismissed in the 16 team Zambian Premier League. His assistant Peter Kaumba took charge for the remaining three league matches. NAPSA managed to avoid relegation and won the Barclays Cup.

Phiri then joined Green Buffaloes in February 2013 and led them to a top six finish though he resigned the following season and had a brief stint as Namibia's Technical Advisor before returning to Simba in August 2014. Phiri only lasted a few months in his third stint at Simba and was fired on 31 December 2014. He aimed a parting shot at the club's officials for interfering in his duties as coach: "Unless some of the officials learn to draw a line between technical bench matters and their routine duties at the club, Simba will continue to experience a stuttering performance both locally and at international level," he said.

He returned to Zambia and took over at Premier League side Nakambala Leopards in July 2015 after the Mazabuka side suffered a string of losses and oversaw a climb from bottom to 12th position and safety with a dramatic final day victory over Konkola Blades. He quit Leopards in May 2016 to take over at Forest Rangers in Ndola, masterminding a climb from second bottom to 9th position by the end of the season.

He then quit Rangers in January 2017 to rejoin Lusaka Dynamos who had only survived relegation after the number of teams in the FAZ Super League were increased, but were under new management and had spent big on both local and foreign players in an ambitious project to dominate Zambian football. A fifth-place finish at the end of the season was viewed as not matching the club's ambition so Phiri parted company with Dynamos to return to Mazabuka in his 16th coaching appointment and announced that he was aiming to win the league title with Leopards.

== Personal life ==
Phiri is married to Cecilia Mutale and they have two children; Melesianiah and Patrick Jnr who has not followed in his father's famous footsteps.

== Honours ==
Playing Honours

- Heroes & Unity Cup: 1977 and 1979
- BP Challenge Cup: 1982
- Champion of Champions: 1983

Coaching Honours

- Zambian Premier League: 1999 and 2001
- Zambian Cup: 2000
- BP Top 8 Cup: 1997, 1998 and 2000
- Zambian Charity Shield: 2000
- Tanzanian Premier League: 2004/05 and 2009/10
- Tanzanian Tusker Cup: 2005
- COSAFA Cup: 2006
- CECAFA Cup: 2006

Individual Awards

- Zambian Coach of the Year: 1999
- Tanzanian Coach of the Year: 2009/10
