= Kitwe Derby =

Rivalry of two Zambian football teams

- Other names: El Kopala, Chibwe Derby
- Location: Kitwe, Copperbelt Province, Zambia
- Teams: Nkana; Power Dynamos
- First meeting: 1979 (top-flight league)
- Latest meeting: April 2025; Zambia Super League; Nkana 1–1 Power Dynamos
- Next meeting: 05 November 2025; 2025–26 Zambia Super League
- Stadiums: Nkana Stadium(Nkana); Arthur Davies Stadium (Power Dynamos)

Statistics
- Total meetings: 32 (since 2011)
- Most wins: Power Dynamos (16)
- Most player appearances: Data unavailable
- Top scorer: Data unavailable
- All-time series: Power Dynamos: 16; Drawn: 6 Nkana: 10
- Largest victory: Power Dynamos 4–0 Nkana (2011)

The Kitwe Derby is the meeting of the association football clubs Nkana and Power Dynamos, both of which are based in Kitwe, Copperbelt Province, Zambia. The two clubs are among the most prominent football teams in Kitwe, and their meetings are regarded as one of the notable rivalries in Zambian football. The derby is also known as the El Kopala and Chibwe Derby.

The rivalry developed after Power Dynamos were promoted to the Zambian top flight in 1979. Before then, Nkana's main local rivalry was with Kitwe United. Since Power Dynamos joined the top flight, the two clubs have regularly met in the Zambia Super League and domestic cup competitions.

As of April 2025, the two teams had recorded 32 meetings since 2011, with Power Dynamos winning 16, Nkana winning 10 and six matches ending in draws. Power Dynamos have scored 42 goals in those matches, compared with 28 by Nkana.

The two clubs play their home matches at Nkana Stadium in Wusakile and Arthur Davies Stadium in Ndeke respectively. Both stadiums are located in Kitwe and are used for meetings between the clubs.

The derby has also been marked by incidents involving supporters. In April 2025, a match at Nkana Stadium ended in a 1–1 draw after Power Dynamos were awarded a late penalty. The decision was followed by disturbances and damage to stadium seats, with reports stating that more than 500 seats were damaged.

== Origins and Significance ==
The rivalry gained prominence following Power Dynamos’ promotion to the Zambian top flight in 1979. Prior to that, local football rivalries in Kitwe mainly featured Nkana and Kitwe United. The Kitwe Derby is also affectionately known by names like "El Kopala" and "Chibwe Derby," reflecting local culture and the close-knit football community in the Copperbelt.

== Atmosphere ==
The derby is famous for its electrifying atmosphere, often drawing record-breaking crowds and generating massive interest across Zambia. Fans from across the Copperbelt and beyond travel to witness the match live, and local broadcasters and media provide extensive coverage.

== Recent Incidents ==
The 2025 edition of the Kitwe Derby ended in drama and controversy. A late penalty awarded to Power Dynamos led to outrage among Nkana supporters, resulting in crowd trouble and vandalism. Over 500 stadium seats were reportedly damaged, and the Zambian government publicly condemned the violence.

Despite the tension, the match ended 1–1 and was hailed for its competitive quality.

== Competitive record ==
Since 2011, Power Dynamos have held the advantage in the derby. They had won 16 of the 32 recorded meetings, compared with 10 wins for Nkana and six draws, before the 2025–26 season. The teams drew 1–1 on 8 November 2025 before Power Dynamos won 1–0 at home on 11 April 2026. Power Dynamos therefore have 17 wins to Nkana's 10, with seven draws in the recorded meetings since 2011.

=== Overall record ===
Team	League	Cups*	Total
Fixtures	31	1	32
Nkana	10	1	11
Power Dynamos	15	0	15
Draws	6	0	6

*Includes the 2014 Barclays Cup quarter-final. League record covers matches from 2011 through the 2025–26 season.

=== Win percentage ===
Team	League	Cup	Overall
Nkana	32.3%	100%	34.4%
Power Dynamos	48.4%	0%	46.9%
Draws	19.4%	0%	18.8%

=== All-time results ===
==== League ====
Season	Date	Venue	Fixture	Score
2025–26	11 April 2026	Arthur Davies Stadium	Power Dynamos vs Nkana	1–0
2025–26	8 November 2025	Nkana Stadium	Nkana vs Power Dynamos	1–1
2024–25	20 April 2025	Nkana Stadium	Nkana vs Power Dynamos	1–1
2024–25	7 December 2024	Arthur Davies Stadium	Power Dynamos vs Nkana	1–2
2023–24	20 April 2024	Arthur Davies Stadium	Power Dynamos vs Nkana	0–2
2023–24	12 November 2023	Nkana Stadium	Nkana vs Power Dynamos	0–2
2022–23	29 April 2023	Arthur Davies Stadium	Power Dynamos vs Nkana	2–0
2022–23	19 November 2022	Nkana Stadium	Nkana vs Power Dynamos	0–1
2021–22	23 April 2022	Arthur Davies Stadium	Power Dynamos vs Nkana	1–0
2021–22	12 December 2021	Nkana Stadium	Nkana vs Power Dynamos	2–0
2020–21	9 May 2021	Arthur Davies Stadium	Power Dynamos vs Nkana	0–2
2020–21	27 February 2021	Nkana Stadium	Nkana vs Power Dynamos	0–3
2019–20	22 December 2019	Arthur Davies Stadium	Power Dynamos vs Nkana	3–0
2019	20 April 2019	Arthur Davies Stadium	Power Dynamos vs Nkana	0–2
2019	16 February 2019	Nkana Stadium	Nkana vs Power Dynamos	0–2
2018	7 July 2018	Arthur Davies Stadium	Power Dynamos vs Nkana	2–2
2018	2 April 2018	Nkana Stadium	Nkana vs Power Dynamos	1–2
2017	21 October 2017	Arthur Davies Stadium	Power Dynamos vs Nkana	0–1
2017	17 June 2017	Nkana Stadium	Nkana vs Power Dynamos	1–2
2016	3 September 2016	Arthur Davies Stadium	Power Dynamos vs Nkana	1–0
2016	14 May 2016	Nkana Stadium	Nkana vs Power Dynamos	1–1
2015	29 August 2015	Arthur Davies Stadium	Power Dynamos vs Nkana	2–1
2015	3 May 2015	Nkana Stadium	Nkana vs Power Dynamos	1–0
2014	26 October 2014	Arthur Davies Stadium	Power Dynamos vs Nkana	1–2
2014	14 June 2014	Nkana Stadium	Nkana vs Power Dynamos	1–1
2013	9 November 2013	Arthur Davies Stadium	Power Dynamos vs Nkana	1–1
2013	3 July 2013	Nkana Stadium	Nkana vs Power Dynamos	2–0
2012	20 October 2012	Arthur Davies Stadium	Power Dynamos vs Nkana	2–0
2012	19 May 2012	Nkana Stadium	Nkana vs Power Dynamos	1–5
2011	6 August 2011	Arthur Davies Stadium	Power Dynamos vs Nkana	0–1
2011	9 April 2011	Nkana Stadium	Nkana vs Power Dynamos	0–0

==== Cup ====
Competition	Date	Venue	Fixture	Score
Barclays Cup	14 September 2014	Nkoloma Stadium	Nkana vs Power Dynamos	2–0

== Stadiums ==
- Nkana Stadium (Wusakile) – home of Nkana F.C.
- Arthur Davies Stadium (Ndeke) – home of Power Dynamos F.C.

== See also ==
- Zambian Super League
- Nkana F.C.
- Power Dynamos F.C.
- List of association football rivalries
