= Charles Muntanga =

Zambian footballer

Personal information
- Date of birth: 21 July 1995 (age 31)
- Place of birth: Maamba, Zambia
- Height: 1.87 m (6 ft 2 in)
- Position: Goalkeeper

Team information
- Current team: Nkwazi F.C.

Senior career*
Years	Team	Apps	(Gls)
2014–2015	Nchanga Rangers F.C.		
2016–	Nkwazi F.C.		
2019–	Zanaco F.C.		

International career
2019–	Zambia	1	(0)
- * Club domestic league appearances and goals

Charles Muntanga (born 21 July 1997) is a Zambian football goalkeeper who currently plays for Nkwazi F.C.
