= Brian Musonda =

Zambian footballer (born 1982)

Personal information
- Date of birth: 25 June 1982 (age 44)
- Place of birth: Chingola, Zambia
- Height: 1.79 m (5 ft 10 in)
- Position: Defender

Senior career*
Years	Team	Apps	(Gls)
2006–2010	Nkwazi F.C.		
2010–2012	Green Buffaloes F.C.		
2013–2016	Nkwazi F.C.		

International career
2010–2011	Zambia	5	(0)
- * Club domestic league appearances and goals

Brian Musonda (born 25 June 1982) is a retired Zambian football defender.
