= Aubrey Funga =

Zambian footballer (born 1990)

Personal information
- Date of birth: 28 June 1990 (age 36)
- Place of birth: Zambia
- Position: Forward

Senior career*
Years	Team	Apps	(Gls)
- Nkana F.C.
2012–2013	Nchanga Rangers F.C.→(loan)		
2013–2016	Zanaco F.C.		
2017	Ajax Cape Town F.C.	4	(1)
2017–	Lusaka Dynamos F.C.		
- * Club domestic league appearances and goals

Aubrey Funga (born 28 June 1990) is a Zambian professional footballer.

== Career ==
Starting out at Nkana F.C., Funga soon joined Nchanga Rangers F.C. before spending three seasons at Zanaco F.C. He performed well for the team, netting 24 goals in his last season there. Shortly after, the forward penned a four-year deal to play for Ajax Cape Town F.C. of the South African Premier Division. There, he satiated his goal ratio with a consolation strike in a 2–1 loss to Maritzburg United F.C. Finally, Funga was released by the club and resorted to Lusaka Dynamos of the Zambian Premier League in the mid-season window.
