= Dabwitso Nkhoma =

Zambian footballer (born 1977)

Personal information
- Date of birth: 8 July 1977 (age 49)
- Position: Forward

Senior career*
Years	Team	Apps	(Gls)
- Highlanders F.C.
- Motor Action F.C.
- Zanaco F.C.
- NAPSA Stars F.C.

International career
1995–1997	Zambia	7	(0)
- * Club domestic league appearances and goals

Dabwitso Nkhoma (born 8 July 1977) is a retired Zambian football striker.
