= Ndala Monga =

Congolese footballer

Personal information
- Full name: Fanfan Ndala Monga
- Date of birth: 11 April 1986 (age 40)
- Height: 1.76 m (5 ft 9 in)
- Position: Goalkeeper

Team information
- Current team: Lusaka Dynamos F.C.
- Number: 1

Senior career*
Years	Team	Apps	(Gls)
–2016	FC Saint-Éloi Lupopo		
2016	Kabwe Warriors F.C.		
2017–	Lusaka Dynamos F.C.		

International career
2009	DR Congo	1	(0)
- * Club domestic league appearances and goals

Fanfan Ndala Monga (born 11 April 1986) is a Congolese football goalkeeper who plays for Lusaka Dynamos F.C.
