= Roméo Otodjibaye =

Chadian footballer (born 1995)

Personal information
- Full name: Kandjidi Ningahar Otodjibaye
- Date of birth: 15 August 1995 (age 31)
- Place of birth: N'Djamena, Chad
- Height: 1.82 m (6 ft 0 in)
- Position: Midfielder

Team information
- Current team: Indeni

Senior career*
Years	Team	Apps	(Gls)
2013	Tourbillon FC		
2014–2018	Renaissance FC		
2018–2019	Aigle Royal Menoua		
2019	Yong Sports Academy		
2019–2020	Union Douala		
2020–	Indeni		

International career^{‡}
2019–	Chad	4	(0)
- * Club domestic league appearances and goals ‡ National team caps and goals as of 05:22, 31 October 2021 (UTC)

Kandjidi Ningahar Otodjibaye (born 16 August 1995), known as Roméo Otodjibaye, is a Chadian professional footballer who plays as a midfielder for Zambia Super League club Indeni and the Chad national team.

== Club career ==
Otodjibaye signed for Zambian side Indeni in October 2020.

== International career ==
On 5 September 2019, Otodjibaye made his debut for the Chad national team in a 3–1 loss to Sudan in FIFA World Cup qualification.
