= Stanley Nshimbi =

Zambian footballer (born 1992)

Personal information
- Date of birth: 19 August 1992 (age 34)
- Place of birth: Lusaka, Zambia
- Height: 1.70 m (5 ft 7 in)
- Position: Midfielder

Team information
- Current team: Red Arrows F.C.

Senior career*
Years	Team	Apps	(Gls)
2008–2009	Lusaka Dynamos F.C.		
2010	Red Arrows F.C.		
2011	ZESCO United F.C.		
2012–	Red Arrows F.C.		

International career
2012–2017	Zambia	5	(0)
- * Club domestic league appearances and goals

Stanley Nshimbi (born 19 August 1992) is a Zambian football midfielder who currently plays for Red Arrows F.C.
