= Zambia National League =

Male football division in Zambia

National League
- Founded: 2019
- Country: Zambia
- Confederation: CAF
- Number of clubs: 18
- Level on pyramid: 2
- Promotion to: Zambia Super League
- Relegation to: Provincial Division One
- Domestic cup(s): ABSA Cup; Eden University Charity Shield (Samuel 'Zoom' Ndhlovu Charity Shield) (top 2 clubs)
- Current champions: Makeni All Stars
- Most championships: Indeni, Konkola Blades, Lumwana Radiants, Trident FC, Nchanga Rangers, Makeni All Stars (1 title)
- Current: 2025/26

The Zambian National League (formerly the Zambian National Division One) is the second highest football division for men in Zambia and was introduced for the 2019/20 season with 18 teams. The league is administered by Zambian Premier League and is because of sponsorship reasons called Eden University National Division One League, as Eden University and FAZ signed a five year's agreement prior the inaugural season. The league operates on a system of promotion and relegation with Zambia Super League and Zambian Division One, and is played over 34 games.

On October 8, 2024, the Zambian National Division One was rebranded as the Zambian National League.

== Structure of the league ==
The league comprises 18 teams. Over the course of a season, each team plays twice against the others in the league, once at 'home' and once 'away', resulting in each team competing in 34 games in total. Three points are awarded for a win, one for a draw and zero for a loss. At the end of the season, the four top teams and the are promoted to the Super League and the bottom four teams are relegated to the provincial division one. The top two teams will compete in the Charity Shield ahead of next season while the top two after 17 games will join six teams from the top flight in the ABSA Cup.

== Sponsorship ==
On 24 November 2020, the Football Association of Zambia (FAZ) signed a tripartite broadcast sponsorship deal with Zambia National Broadcasting Corporation (ZNBC) and TopStar (StarTimes) that will see National Division One matches beamed live on TV.

== Qualification to the league ==
The teams placed 5-14 are automatically qualified for the next season. The four promoted teams will be replaced by four relegated teams from the Super League. The four relegated teams will be replaced by four teams that win the National Division One qualifier which consists of the ten provincial division one champions.

== Inaugural season ==
Teams that was qualified for the first season 2019–20 came from both the Zambia Super League and the old Zambian Division One. Four teams were relegated from the 2019 Zambian Super League, two from each stream (Kitwe United and Prison Leopards FC from Stream A and F.C MUZA and Circuit City F.C. (who were acquired by and absorbed into Nchanga Rangers F.C. from Provincial division one, and took over the spot) from Stream B). Losing teams of the qualifiers to the 2019–20 Zambian Super League (which was played between division one zone-winners) (National Assembly F.C. and Young Green Eagles FC) along with teams placed 2nd, 3rd and 4th from each of the four provincial division one zones. (Zone 1: Police College F.C, Zesco Malaiti Rangers FC, Kafue Celtic FC Zone 2: Gomes FC, Indeni, Chambishi F.C. Zone 3: Zambeef FC, Mpulungu Harbour FC, Chindwin Sentries FC Zone 4: Zesco Shockers F.C, Mumbwa Medics, Sinazongwe United)

== Promoted teams to Super League ==
Season	Winners	Runners-up	3rd place	4th place
2019–20	Indeni	Prison Leopards	Young Green Eagles	Kitwe United
2020–21	Konkola Blades	Kafue Celtic	Kansanshi Dynamos	Chambishi
2021–22	Lumwana Radiants	MUZA	NAPSA Stars	Nchanga Rangers
2022–23	Trident	Mutondo Stars	Mufulira Wanderers	Konkola Blades
2023–24	Nchanga Rangers	Lumwana Radiants	Atletico Lusaka	Indeni
2024–25	Konkola Blades	Kansanshi Dynamos	Mines United	Prison Leopards
2025–26	Makeni All Stars	Chirundu United	Trident F.C	Roan United
