= Atletico Lusaka F.C. =

Atletico Lusaka
- Full name: Atletico Lusaka Football Club
- Nickname: Bad Boys
- Founded: 2020; 6 years ago
- Ground: Toyota Arena Sports Complex
- Capacity: 5,000
- League: Zambia Super League
- 2024–25: 15th (relegated)

Atletico Lusaka Football Club is a professional football club based in Lusaka, Zambia. The club was founded in 2020 and played in the Zambia Super League.

In their single season in the top tier, the team was noted for playing entertaining football, but this came at the expense of results and the team was relegated on the final day of the 2024–25 Zambia Super League season. They led 2–1 with 17 minutes remaining, but ultimately lost 3–2 to fall into the relegation zone.

== Seasons ==
Atletico Lusaka gained promotion to the Zambian Super League for the 2024 - 2025 season from the National Division.

Seasons	League	Position	Points	Goals scored
2022–23	National Division	14th	42	48
2023–24	National Division	3rd	58	53
2024–25	Zambia Super League	15th	39	27
