= Mines United F.C. =

- Full name: Mines United Football Club
- Nickname: MineBola
- Ground: President Stadium
- Capacity: 6,000
- Chairman: Mathew Mohan
- Manager: Christopher "Gazza" Tembo
- League: National Division One (II)
- 2025-26: 17th, Zambia Super League (relegated)

Mines United Football Club, commonly known as Mines United or by the nickname MineBola, is a Zambian football club based in Makululu, a township in Kabwe. The team currently competes in the Zambia Super League, having earned their first-ever promotion to the top tier ahead of the 2025–26 season—marking a major milestone in the club’s development. However, the club is also facing contract uncertainties among players ahead of their Super League debut, which management is reportedly working to resolve.

== History ==
Mines United earned recognition in Zambian football through consistent performances in the lower leagues. During the 2024–25 campaign, the club played in the Zambia National Division One, finishing as high as 6th at one point in the season. One of their most notable results came in the Kabwe Derby, where they secured a win against local rivals thanks to a decisive goal from Progress Bwalya. Their promotion to the Super League was confirmed in mid-2025.

== Management and Structure ==
In July 2025, Mines United appointed Christopher Tembo, popularly known as "Gazza", as head coach. He replaced Geoffrey Hamakwenda, bringing with him experience from clubs in Zambia and Eswatini, including a title-winning spell with Malanti Chiefs.

== Future Plans and Infrastructure ==
Club chairman Mathew Mohan, who took over in 2024, thanked the players and technical staff for their efforts. Speaking on Sports Day on ZNBC Radio 4, he said: “We took over this team last year when it was in Division One, qualified them to the National League and within nine months they secured promotion to the Super League.”

As part of their long-term goals, Mines United announced plans to construct a 15,000-seater stadium at the current site of President Stadium in Kabwe. The club now manages the venue under a Memorandum of Understanding with the Zambian Army. The new stadium will also feature a shopping centre to help promote local business and economic activity.

Mohan stated: “Our target as Mines United is to actually win the Premier League for the 2025/26 season. We are not coming to joke around—we’re here to create value for our community.”

== Achievements ==
- Promotion to the Zambia Super League: 2025–26 season
