= Konkola Stadium =

Coordinates: 12°21′38″S 27°49′27″E

Konkola Stadium is a multi-purpose stadium in Chililabombwe, Zambia. Built in the 1950s, it is currently used mostly for football matches and serves as the home for Konkola Blades Football Club and Konkola Mine Police. The stadium holds 20,000 people.
