= Konkola Mine Police F.C. =

Zambian football club

Konkola Mine Police
- Full name: Konkola Mine Police Football Club
- Ground: Konkola Stadium, Chililabombwe
- Capacity: 20,000
- Chairman: Gideon Mwenya
- Manager: Mulenga Andrew
- League: Division one
- 2019/2020: 11th

Konkola Mine Police is a Zambian football club based in Chililabombwe that plays in the MTN/FAZ Super Division. The team plays its home games at Konkola Stadium in Chililabombwe.
