= Trident F.C. =

Football club in Zambia

Trident Football Club
- Full name: Trident Football Club
- Nickname: The Conquerors
- Founded: 2015; 11 years ago
- Ground: Solwezi Independence Stadium
- Capacity: 5,000
- Manager: Arnold Malisawa Interim head coach
- League: National Division One
- 2024–25: 5th

Trident Football Club, is a Zambian football club that competes since summer 2023 for the first time in the Zambia Super League. Founded in 2015, the club is based in the North Western region of Zambia and has steadily risen in prominence over recent years. Trident F.C. earned its position in the Zambia Super League following a successful campaign during the 2022/2023 FAZ National Division One League, where they clinched the championship with an impressive tally of 62 points. In March 2023 Trident FC reached for the first time the semi-finals of ABSA Cup with a 1–0 win against the Green Eagles thanks to a late Peter Musukuma goal.

== Home ground ==
The home ground for Trident F.C. is Sentinel Grounds, which serves as the team's primary venue for hosting matches and conducting training sessions. However, in light of efforts to enhance the facility to meet the minimum standards mandated for Super Division football, the club temporarily relocated its home matches to Nkana Stadium in order to provide its players and supporters improved conditions.
