= National Assembly F.C. =

Zambian football club

National Assembly
- Full name: National Assembly Football Club
- Ground: Edwin Imboela Stadium, Lusaka
- Capacity: 6,000
- League: Zambian Premier League
- 2018: 17th
Home colours

National Assembly Football Club is a Zambian football club based in Lusaka. They play in the top division in Zambian football. Their home stadium is Edwin Imboela Stadium.
