= Edwin Imboela Stadium =

Multi-use stadium in Lusaka, Zambia

Coordinates: 15.4247°S 28.3014°E

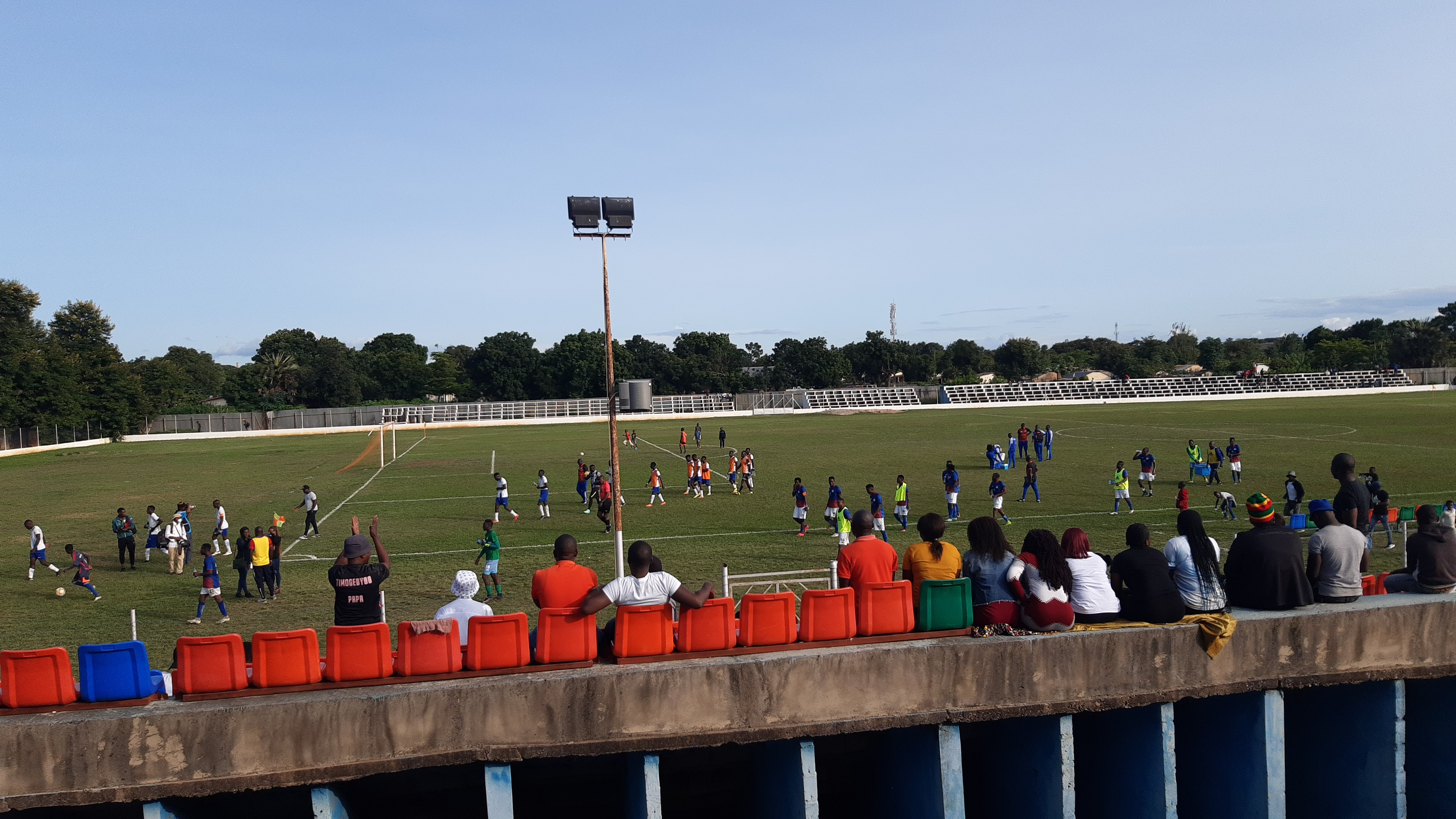
Edwin Imboela Stadium in 2022

Edwin Imboela Stadium is a multi-use stadium in Lusaka, Zambia. It is currently used mostly for football matches and serves as the home for Nkwazi F.C. and Green Buffaloes F.C.

The stadium holds 6,000 people. It was opened in 1959.
