= Mutondo Stars F.C. =

Football club in Zambia

Mutondo Stars Football Club
- Full name: Mutondo Stars Football Club
- Nickname: Evergreen
- Ground: Levy Mwanawasa Stadium
- Capacity: 49,800
- League: Zambia Super League
- 2025–26: 16th

Mutondo Stars Football Club, is a football club based in the city of Kitwe, Zambia. They were promoted to the Zambia Super League for the 2023/24 season.

The club was revived in 2020 by members of the Nkana football club. The club plays some of their matches in the top flight at Levy Mwanawasa Stadium, including their local rivalry with Nkana.
