= Lusaka Dynamos F.C. =

Zambian football club

Lusaka Dynamos
- Full name: Lusaka Dynamos Football Club
- Nickname: The Elite
- Founded: 1979; 46 years ago
- Ground: National Heroes Stadium; Lusaka, Zambia
- Capacity: 60,000
- League: Zambian Premier League
- 2021–22: 15th
Home colours	Away colours

Lusaka Dynamos Football Club is a Zambian football club based in Lusaka. Lusaka Dynamos Football Club is a Zambian football club based in Lusaka. The club's nickname is "The Elite" and it lives up to its billing by way of the profile it commands in the media and general public. Lusaka Dynamos plays in the top division of the Football Association of Zambia league, called the Zambia Super League. The club colours are: Home colours – Red with white highlighters and Away colours are White with red highlighter or Gray with crazy green highlighter or Orange with black. The kit brand is currently Umbro having been dressed by Macron for the last 2 seasons. Before that, the club was dressed by a local sports brand Yesu.

Lusaka Dynamos is renowned for its ability to nurture upcoming footballers into fully-fledged players. The club's president is Hanif Adam – a businessman and experienced administrator. All home games are played at National Heroes Stadium in Lusaka. The main sponsor of Lusaka Dynamos is businessman Bokani Soko.

== History ==
The club was formed in 1979 by Hanif Adam who was a popular DJ around Lusaka nightclubs. He was also a part time player at the club, which slowly evolved into one that focused on giving youths from different communities opportunities, and then later sell them on.

Lusaka Dynamos has sold players to destinations including Germany, Israel, and South Africa. A number of former Zambia National Team players trace their roots to the club.

Lusaka Dynamos has also given opportunities to footballers who arrived as refugees in Zambia to revive their careers at the club, with a number coming from Rwanda and Liberia. The club a few years ago decided to change its strategy in a bid to compete for honors. The club has recently signed several star players from across Africa, as well as identifying potential stars of the Zambian game. Of late, the club has made a name by signing up some of the great talent from around Africa and has even had layers from as far as Brazil on its rooster.

Lusaka Dynamos have yet to win a league title with its best position being 5th in 2017 while the club won its one and only trophy in the 2008 BP Top 8 Cup after beating Zesco United 1–0 in the final. LD remains the reigning BP Top 8 Champion as the competition has not been held since. LD also beat ZESCO in the final of the 2021 ABSA Cup (Zambia) champions.

== Achievements ==
- Zambian Challenge Cup: 1

2008

- ABSA Cup: 1

2021

== Club Officials ==
- President: (Zambia) Hanif Adams
- Club Patron: (Zambia) Patrick Kangwa
- Chief Executive Officer: (Zambia) Meeth Naik
- Club Secretary: (Zambia) Twambo Phiri
- Executive Committee Member: (Zambia) Richard Phiri
- Club Lawyer: (Zambia) Kennedy Mambwe
- Business Development Manager: (Zambia) Ntinda Kandeke
- Sales Executive: (Zambia) Stephen Tom Phiri

== Management Staff ==
- Senior Team Manager: (Zambia) Francis Bwalya
- Youth Team Manager: (Zambia) Brian Sapi
- Technical/Corporate Affairs Manager: (Zambia) Shalala Oliver Sepiso

== Technical Staff ==
- Head Coach: (Zambia) Patrick Phiri
- First Assistant Coach: (Zambia) Christopher 'Gazza' Tembo
- Assistant Coach: (Zambia) Ronald Mukosha
- Physical Trainer: (Zambia) Manchi Janza
- Goalkeeping Coach: (Zambia) Stephen Mwansa
- Head Youth Coach: (Zambia) Ian Bakala
- Youth Coach: (Zambia) Josphat Nkhoma

== Administrative and Support Staff ==
- Team Doctor: (Zambia) Komani Munthali
- Senior Physiotherapist: (Zambia) Gift Nyambe
- Physiotherapist: (Zambia) Sam Siatalimi
- Kit Master: (Zambia) Joseph Zeka Mbuti
- Assistant Kit Master: (Zambia) Kika Musimbi
- Transport Officer: (Zambia) Kennedy Zulu
- Security Officer: (Zambia) Peter Namusiya
- Fans Coordinator: (Zambia) Sosten Daka

== 2019 squad ==
Note: Flags indicate national team as defined under FIFA eligibility rules; some limited exceptions apply. Players may hold more than one non-FIFA nationality.

No.	Pos.	Nation	Player
22	GK	COD	Monga Ndala
21	GK	ZAM	Mulenga Zimba Mulenga
18	GK	CGO	Donald Mfoutou
15	DF	ZAM	Paul Banda
35	DF	ZAM	Michael Ng'ambi
3	DF	ZIM	Ocean Mushure
26	DF	ZAM	Mathews Ngoma
24	DF	ZAM	Boston Mwanza
13	DF	ZAM	Zimiseleni Moyo
44	DF	ZIM	Dauda Dennis
25	DF	ZAM	George Chilufya
2	DF	NAM	Tiberius Lombard
6	DF	COD	Kambo Alife Bienvenu
5	DF	ZAM	Benson Nzuma
12	MF	CMR	Walters
16	MF	ZAM	Sydney Kalume
40	MF	ZAM	Godfrey Chibanga
36	MF	ZAM	Ramsey Mwaka
31	MF	ZAM	Marvin Jere

No.	Pos.	Nation	Player
7	MF	ZAM	Fwayo Tembo
38	MF	COD	Lemisa Moussa
77	MF	ZAM	Aubrey Funga
4	MF	ZAM	Reuben Chansa
70	MF	COD	Keta Ilunga
19	MF	ZAM	Hosea Silwimba
23	MF	ZAM	Nelson Tembo
29	MF	ZAM	Mwaba Simpasa
9	FW	COD	Chris Mugalu
30	FW	NAM	Petrus Shitembi
10	FW	NAM	Willy Stephanus
14	FW	NAM	Hendrik Somaeb
17	FW	ZAM	Emmanuel Habasimbi
11	FW	ZAM	Conlyde Luchanga
32	FW	BFA	Kabore Omar
20	FW	ZAM	Mwansa Nsofwa
8	FW	COD	Tardelie Ilunga
39	FW	COD	Jonathan Yaya Mangala Litimba
33	FW	ZAM	Toffee Msarirwa
