= Lumwana Radiants F.C. =

Zambian football club

Lumwana Radiants
- Full name: Lumwana Radiants Football Club
- Founded: 2010
- Ground: Lumwana Grounds, Kalumbila District, Zambia
- Capacity: 3,000
- Owner: Lumwana Mining Company
- Chairman: Besa Kansumba
- Manager: Bilton Musonda
- Coach: Allan Kamwanga
- League: Zambian Premier League
- 2024–25: 17th (relegated)

Lumwana Radiants is a football team from Lumwana, Zambia, currently playing in the Zambian Premier League. They were the first team from northwestern Zambia to play in the Zambian top flight.

== History ==
Radiants won promotion to the Zambian Premier League in 2015 after winning the Division One North competition with a game to spare. The club upgraded their Lumwana Grounds before the 2016 season in order to participate.

Lumwana extended their top flight stay in the 2018 season after surviving relegation on the last round defeating Nchanga Rangers F.C. 2–0 to finish 16th, one spot out of the relegation spots.
