= Indeni F.C. =

Zambian football club

Indeni
- Full name: Indeni Football Club
- Nickname: Oilo
- Ground: Indeni Sports Complex, Ndeke Township Ndola
- Capacity: Unspecified but up to 2000
- League: Zambia Premier League
- 2025–26: 11th

Indeni is a Zambian football club based in Ndola that plays in the second division (National League) of the Zambian Premier League.

== Stadium ==
They play their home games at Indeni Sports Complex in Ndola.

== League participation ==
- Zambian Premier League: 2011–2012, 2013
- Zambian Second Division: 2012–2013
