= Konkola Blades F.C. =

Zambian football club

Konkola Blades
- Full name: Konkola Blades Football Club
- Nickname: Sharp Razor
- Founded: 1956; 70 years ago (as Bancroft North End)
- Ground: Konkola Stadium, Chililabombwe
- Capacity: 20,000
- Chairman: Davy Mubita
- Head coach: Beston Chambeshi
- League: Zambian Premier League
- 2025–2026: Zambian Premier League, 9th
Home colours	Away colours	Third colours

Konkola Blades is a Zambian professional football club based in Chililabombwe, that competes in the Zambian Premier League. They play their home games at the 20,000-capacity Konkola Stadium in Chililabombwe.

== Achievements ==
- Zambian Cup:

1983, 1998

- Zambian Division One North:

2005

=== Domestic ===
==== League ====
- Zambian National Division One (Second Tier)
  - Winners (4): 2005, 2016 (Zone 2), 2021, 2025
- Zambia Super League
  - Third Place: 2011

==== Cups ====
- Mosi Cup
  - Winners (2): 1983, 1998
  - Runners-up (3): 1982, 1996, 1999

=== Continental ===
Season	Competition	Round	Club	Home	Away	Aggregate
1999	African Cup Winners' Cup	First round	(Tanzania) Simba	2–1	1–1	3–2
1999	African Cup Winners' Cup	Second round	(Madagascar) AS Marsa	2–1	2–1	4–2
1999	African Cup Winners' Cup	Quarter-finals	(Tunisia) Club Africain	1–1	0–2	1–3

Notable former players

The following players have represented Konkola Blades and earned caps for the Zambia national football team:

- (Zambia) Mumamba Numba
- (Zambia) Lazarous Kambole
- (Zambia) Charles Lota
- (Zambia) Stanley Nshimbi

== Stadium ==
Konkola Stadium is one of Zambia's most architecturally unique sporting venues, located in the mining town of Chililabombwe in the Copperbelt Province. Known for its unusual "sunken" design, the stadium has long been a fortress for local football and a significant piece of Zambian sports history.

=== Key Facts & Features ===
- Capacity: Approximately 20,000 to 25,000 spectators.
- The "Sunken" Pitch: The stadium is famous because the pitch is situated about 15 metres (50 feet) below ground level. It was built in the 1950s, designed to mimic the depth of the nearby open-pit mines.
- Home Teams: It is the primary home ground for the Konkola Blades (nicknamed "Sharp Razor") and has also hosted Konkola Mine Police.
- National Significance: Particularly between 2002 and 2011, it served as a secondary home for the Zambian National Team (Chipolopolo), hosting high-profile international qualifiers due to the intense atmosphere created by its bowl-like structure.

=== Historical Context ===
Originally named the Kenneth Mackay Stadium (after an underground superintendent), the site was once a marshy area with a stream. Local lore suggests the area had to be drained—displacing a large population of frogs—to facilitate construction. Today, it stands as a symbol of the town's mining heritage, owned and maintained largely through the influence of Konkola Copper Mines (KCM).

=== International Significance ===
Between 2002 and 2011, Konkola Stadium became a primary venue for the Zambian National Team. This was largely necessitated by the closure or unfitness of other major venues, such as the Independence Stadium in Lusaka.

The stadium’s steep, sunken design created an intimidating environment for visiting teams. Notable international matches hosted at the venue include:

- Africa Cup of Nations Qualifiers: Matches against nations including Congo Brazzaville, South Africa, and Togo.
- FIFA World Cup Qualifiers: Several rounds for the 2006 and 2010 World Cup campaigns.

=== 2007 Stadium Tragedy ===
On June 2, 2007, the stadium was the site of a major tragedy following an Africa Cup of Nations qualifier between Zambia and Congo Brazzaville.

After Zambia secured a 3–0 victory, a massive stampede broke out as fans were exiting the venue. The disaster resulted in 12 deaths (nine men and three women) and at least 46 injuries. Several contributing factors were identified:

- Timing: The match started late due to the delayed arrival of the referee. By the time the match concluded, visibility was poor.
- Exit Congestion: Reports indicated that only one gate was open in the "open wing" section. As fans rushed to reach free transport provided for those traveling from other towns, the crowd surged, causing a gate to become unhinged and fall on spectators.
- Overcrowding: The stadium was reportedly packed beyond its official capacity.

The event led to significant changes in how the Football Association of Zambia manages crowd safety and stadium security for high-profile matches.

=== Current Status ===
As of early 2026, the stadium continues to host Zambian Premier League matches. There have been ongoing discussions regarding modernization and enhancements to meet CAF standards, it remains as a "cauldron" where the proximity of the fans to the pitch creates a unique matchday experience.
