= Arthur Davies Stadium =

Multi-use stadium in Kitwe, Zambia

- Interactive map of Arthur Davies Stadium
- Location: Ndeke, Kitwe, Zambia
- Coordinates: 12°50′38″S 28°13′58″E
- Owner: Power Dynamos F.C.
- Operator: Power Dynamos F.C.
- Surface: Grass

Construction
- Opened: 1977

Tenant
- Power Dynamos F.C.

Arthur Davies Stadium is a multi-use stadium in Kitwe, Zambia, named after Arthur Walter Davies who was a FIFA-accredited referee and active member of the Zambian FA. Whilst General Manager of the Copperbelt Power Corporation (now the Copperbelt Energy Corporation) which is based in Kitwe, he established the Power Dynamos F.C. and the stadium.

The stadium has an eight-lane running track and incorporates a main front building which houses a presidential suite, a large conference room, offices, a gymnasium, a clinic, physiotherapy room, a police post and a club-house.
