= FC Leopards =

Zambian football club

- Full name: Football Club Leopards
- Nicknames: Leopards, The Correction Boys, The Super Correct Boys
- Founded: 1974; 52 years ago
- Ground: Godfrey Chitalu Stadium, Kabwe
- Capacity: 10,000
- Chairman: Kennedy Sikota
- Manager: Chris Kaunda
- League: National Division One (II)
- 2025-26: 17th, Zambia Super League (relegated)
Home colours	Away colours

FC Leopards, called Prison Leopards Football Club before 2025, is a Zambian football club based in Kabwe, Zambia. The club plays its football in the Zambia Super League, the highest division in Zambian football. The club's kit manufacturer is Joma. The Club sponsored by the Zambia Correctional Service, reflecting its strong ties to the national correctional institution.

== History ==
The club was founded in 1974. The club is based in the city of Kabwe, and they play their matches at Godfrey Chitalu Stadium. It has played the majority of its seasons in the National Division One, but the club has enjoyed most of its success recently, being promoted to the Zambia Super League for the 2020–21 season, finishing 6th, before finishing 16th the next season.

== Current squad ==
As of 24 September 2022

=== Squad ===
As of 17 June 2022

Note: Flags indicate national team as defined under FIFA eligibility rules; some limited exceptions apply. Players may hold more than one non-FIFA nationality.

No.	Pos.	Nation	Player
1	GK	ZAM	Jeff Lungu
32	GK	ZAM	Patrick Chooma
23	DF	ZAM	Zacharia Chilongoshi
21	DF	ZAM	Zephania Phiri
2	DF	ZAM	Simon Nkandu
5	DF	ZAM	Garry Shamfwesa
3	DF	ZAM	Langson Kapumbu
15	DF	GHA	Francis Debrah
25	DF	ZAM	Fred Mushindi (captain)
—	MF	ZAM	Wilmore Haatembo
45	MF	ZAM	Osward Simpamba

No.	Pos.	Nation	Player
18	MF	ZAM	Joy Yolamu
27	MF	ZAM	Damiano Phiri
11	MF	ZAM	Francis Zulu
10	MF	ZAM	Landu Miete
8	FW	ZAM	Lubinda Mundia
—	FW	ZAM	Damiano Kola
37	FW	ZAM	Isaac Ngoma
77	FW	ZAM	Davies Sinyinza
—	FW	ZAM	Junior Zulu
—	FW	ZAM	Saviours Nkonkola
47	FW	ZAM	David Obashi

== Honours ==
- Zambia National Division One
  - Runners-up (1): 2019–20

== Rivalries ==
The club shares a rivalry with Kabwe city neighbours Kabwe Warriors, even sharing the same stadium. However, Kabwe Warriors has had much more success in its history, winning 5 Zambian League titles.
