= Nkana Stadium =

- Pa Chilata
- Interactive map of Nkana Stadium
- Location: Wusakile, Kitwe, Zambia
- Coordinates: 12°50′50″S 28°12′40″E
- Owner: Nkana F.C.
- Operator: Nkana F.C.
- Capacity: 10,000 (Football)
- Surface: Grass

Construction
- Renovated: 2013, 2017

Tenant
- Nkana F.C.

Nkana Stadium, previously known as Scrivener Stadium, is a multi-use stadium in Kitwe, Zambia. It serves as home stadium for MTN/FAZ Super League side Nkana F.C.

The stadium underwent extensive renovations in 2013, that were sponsored by Mopani Copper Mines.

In 1959, the stadium hosted a friendly between Northern Rhodesia and Bolton Wanderers.
