= Nchanga Rangers F.C. =

Zambian football club

Nchanga Rangers fc
- Full name: Nchanga Rangers Football Club
- Nickname: Brave Rangers
- Founded: 1960
- Ground: Nchanga Stadium, Chingola
- Capacity: 20,000
- League: MTN/FAZ Super Division
- 2025–26: 5th of 18
Home colours	Away colours

Nchanga Rangers is a Zambian football club based in Chingola that plays in the MTN/FAZ Super Division. They play their home games at Nchanga Stadium in Chingola.

The club is sponsored by Konkola Copper Mines.

== Achievements ==
- Zambian Premier League: 2

1980, 1998

- Independence Cup: 1

1978

- Zambian Challenge Cup: 3

1965, 1973, 1976

- Zambian Charity Shield: 2

1980, 2002

== Performance in CAF competitions ==
- CAF Champions League: 1 appearance

1999 – First Round

- African Cup of Champions Clubs: 1 appearance

1981 – Quarter-final

- CAF Confederation Cup: 1 appearance

2011 – First Round

- CAF Cup: 2 appearances

1998 – Semi-final
2000 – Quarter-final

- CAF Cup Winners' Cup: 2 appearances

1987 – Quarter-final
1997 – Second Round

== Managers ==
- (Zambia) Fighton Simukonda (2012–2016)
- (Zambia) Bruce Mwape (2016–2021)
- (Zambia) Israel Mwanza (2021– 2022, 2025 - 2027)
- (Zambia) Robert Tembo (2022–2024, 2024-2025)
- (Zambia) Aggrey Chiyangi (2024)
- (Zambia) George Lwandamina (2025–2027)
