= Nkwazi F.C. =

Zambian football club

Nkwazi
- Full name: Nkwazi Football Club
- Nickname: Highflying
- Founded: 1978
- Ground: Edwin Imboela Stadium, Lusaka, Zambia
- Capacity: 6,000
- Chairman: Jacob Mwewa
- Head coach: Gareth Chibulu
- League: Zambian Premier League
- 2025–26: 14th
Home colours

Nkwazi Football Club is a Zambian football club based in Lusaka. They play in the Zambian Premier League, after gaining promotion from Division One South in 2014. Their home stadium is Edwin Imboela Stadium. The club is sponsored by the Zambia Police Service and It has a parallel women's team by the name of Nkwazi Queens which is sponsored by the Zambia Police Service and a private company, Auto Zed Ltd. It has a mix of players that includes police officers and civilians.
