= Kansanshi Dynamos F.C. =

Zambian football club

- Full name: Kansanshi Dynamos
- Nickname: Mabanga Boys
- Short name: KDFC
- Founded: 1994
- Ground: Kansanshi Stadium, Solwezi, Zambia
- Capacity: 10,000
- Owner: First Quantum Mining Ltd
- Chairman: Stephen Kamwendo
- League: Super League (I)
- 2025–26: 11th, Super League

Kansanshi Dynamos Football Club is a Zambian football club based in Solwezi. It plays in the first division of Zambian football. Its home stadium is Solwezi Independence Stadium.
