= NAPSA Stars F.C. =

Association football club in Zambia

NAPSA Stars
- Napsa Stars FC
- Full name: National Pension Scheme Authority Stars Football Club
- Nickname: Pensioners
- Ground: REIZ Arena, Lusaka
- Capacity: 15,000
- Chairman: John Chundu
- Head coach: Perry Mutapa
- League: MTN/FAZ Super Division
- 2025–26: 15th
- Website: https://www.napsastarsfc.co.zm/
| Home colours | Away colours |

NAPSA Stars is a Zambian football club based in Lusaka that plays in the Zambia Super League. They play their home games at REIZ Arena in Lusaka.

Previously known as Profund Warriors, the club is named after and sponsored by the National Pension Scheme Authority (NAPSA).

== Honours ==
- Zambian Barclays Cup (1): 2012
- ABSA Cup 2022
- CAF Confederations qualification (1): 2020
