= Red Arrows F.C. =

Association football club in Zambia

Red Arrows Football Club
- Full name: Red Arrows Football Club
- Nickname: Airmen
- Founded: 1975
- Ground: Nkoloma Stadium, Chelstone, Lusaka
- Capacity: 15,000
- Chairman: Kennedy Sikota
- Manager: Chisi Mbewe
- League: Zambia Super League
- 2025–26: 2nd
Home colours

Red Arrows Football Club is a Zambian football club based in Lusaka that plays in the MTN/FAZ Super Division. They play their home games at Nkoloma Stadium in Chelstone, Lusaka.

== History ==
Red Arrows was established in 1972 as ZAF Lusaka Football. In its first season ZAF Lusaka won the amateur league being promoted to the Zambian second division. The team name changed in 1973 to Zambian Air Force Football Club. They were then promoted to the National League in the same year as the name change. They played the 1974 season under Yugoslav coach Dr. Bravo.

The 1975 season was the year the modern name Red Arrows Football Club was adopted. This name represents the team's philosophy, aiming for a swift and fluid play style.

Arrows qualified for the group stages of the 2026–27 CAF Confederation Cup for the first time by defeating South African giants Kaizer Chiefs in the second round. Arrows rewarded coach Chisi Mbewe with a staff vehicle.

== Honours ==
- Zambian Premier League: 3

2004, 2021–22, 2023–24

- Zambian Cup: 4

2007, 2013, 2023-24, 2026

- Zambian Challenge Cup: 1

1982
Runner-up : 1978, 1989

- Zambian Coca-Cola Cup: 0

Runner-up : 2003, 2004, 2005

- Zambian Charity Shield: 3

2005
2022
2024
2026

- Dar Port Kagame Cup: 1

2024

== Performance in CAF competitions ==
- CAF Champions League: 2 appearance

2005 – Second round
2022–23 - First round

- CAF Confederation Cup: 3 appearances

2009 – First round of 16
2012 – Preliminary round
2021–22 - Playoff round

== Sponsors ==
As of 2013, the side was sponsored by the Zambian Air Force. In 2021-22, Arrows signed a three-year deal with 10Bet.
