= Green Buffaloes F.C. =

Zambian football club

Green Buffaloes
- Full name: Green Buffaloes Football Club
- Nicknames: GBFC; Mboo; International Buffalo; Go, fight and Conquer
- Founded: 1965; 61 years ago (as Zambian Army F.C.)
- Ground: Independence Stadium, Lusaka
- Capacity: 30,000
- Chairman: Lt.Col Jack Mbewe
- Manager: Masauso Tembo
- League: Zambia Super League
- 2025–26: 12th
Home colours	Away colours

Green Buffaloes Football Club is a Zambian professional football club based in Lusaka that competes in the Zambia Super League, the top flight of Zambian football. Founded in 1965 as the Zambian Army Football Club, an association football extension of the Zambian Army, it plays its home matches at the Independence Stadium.

Having previously dominated Zambian football from the early 1970s until the late 1990s, it is one of the country's most successful club winning every single current and historic title on offer. This collection includes 5 League Cups, 4 Shield Challenge Cups, 3 Charity Shields, 2 Heroes and Unit Cups, 3 Champion of Champions Cups and one of the Zambian Challenge Cup, Mosi Cup and Barclays/ABSA Cup.

Green Buffaloes is among four Zambian teams to have won three league titles in a row. In 1975 and 1979, the club won the domestic treble of the League, Champion of Champions and Shield Challenge Cup titles.

== Honours ==
Competition	Year(s) Won
League	1973, 1974, 1975, 1977, 1979, 1981
Shell and BP Challenge Cup	1975, 1977, 1979, 1981
Charity Shield	1974, 1978, 1980
Champion of Champions Cup	1975, 1979, 1982
Heroes and Unity Cup	1978, 1986
BP Challenge Cup	1985
Mosi Cup	2005
Barclays/ABSA Cup	2015

== Performances in CAF competitions ==
- CAF Confederation Cup

2006 – preliminary round
2010 – first round
2017 – preliminary round
2018 – preliminary round
