= 2023 Zambian Charity Shield =

- Event: 2023 Zambian Charity Shield
Power Dynamos	Forest Rangers
1	3
- Date: 12 August 2023
- Venue: Levy Mwanawasa Stadium, Ndola
- Attendance: 1,784

The 2023 Zambian Charity Shield (also known as The 2023 Samuel ‘Zoom’ Ndhlovu Carling Black Label Charity Shield for sponsorship reasons) was the 58th Charity Shield match, an annual football match played between the winners of the previous season's Super League and the ABSA Cup winners. The Charity Shield match acts as the dress rehearsal for the Super League season. The match was played by Power Dynamos the league champions of the 2022/23 season and Forest Rangers winners of the 2023 ABSA Cup tournament. The match began with an early breakthrough as Andy Boyeli of Power Dynamos netted a goal in the 14th minute, setting an energetic tempo. Forest Rangers won the match as they mounted an impressive comeback with their direct style of play. Despite Boyeli's initial goal for Aba Yellow, Forest Rangers responded with goals from Libamba, Simusokwe, and Chishimba, clinching a 3-1 victory.

== Match ==
=== Summary ===
The match ignited with a burst of energy as Andy Boyeli of Power Dynamos found the net in the 14th minute, setting the tone for an intense showdown. Nevertheless, the reigning Super League champions appeared to succumb to complacency as Forest Rangers' more direct style of play began to reshape the course of the game. In the 24th minute, Quadri Kola orchestrated a remarkable sequence on the right wing, unfurling a sublime pass that found its mark as Moyela Libamba thrashed the ball into the net. The Ndola-based squad surged ahead at the 40-minute mark, as Eric Chomba's corner kick found its intended target in Gerald Simusokwe's head, who adeptly guided the ball beyond Mulenga's reach. Just moments before halftime, Forest Rangers fortified their lead when a shot from Libamba was mishandled by Zambian international Lawrence Mulenga, allowing Lazarus Chishimba to capitalize on the error with a meticulously executed strike.

The second half saw Power Dynamos facing a daunting task, requiring a performance that could eradicate the two-goal deficit. Power Dynamos introduced Cephas Mulombwa, Salusani Phiri, Fredrick Mulambia, and John Soko after the break, striving to reclaim control of the game. The late stages of the match witnessed the reigning Super League champions gaining ascendancy as Forest Rangers tactically retreated. Former Fore Malembe star Cephas Mulombwa emerged as a potent force for Power Dynamos, refusing to relinquish the Charity Shield to the very team he had guided to the final through their 2023 ABSA Cup triumph. However, the more Power Dynamos pressed forward, the greater the possibility loomed for Forest Rangers to exploit the transition and notch a fourth goal. In the culmination of the contest, the 2023 ABSA Cup Champions emerged as victors with a final scoreline of 3-1 against the defending Super League champions, Power Dynamos.

=== Details ===
12 August 2023
14:30 UTC+2

Power Dynamos	1-3	Forest Rangers
Boyeli 14'	Report	Chishimba 45'; Simusokwe 40'; Moyela 24'

Levy Mwanawasa Stadium, Ndola
Attendance: 1,784
