= 2023 ABSA Cup final =

- Event: 2023 ABSA Cup
Forest Rangers	Maestro United
2	0
- Date: 27 May 2023
- Venue: Woodlands Stadium, Lusaka
- Man of the Match: Moro Amenu
- Referee: Amin Mohamed Omar (Egypt)
- Attendance: 10,874
- Weather: Sunny

The 2023 ABSA Cup final was an association football match played at Woodlands Stadium in Lusaka, Zambia, on May 27, 2022. This highly anticipated match marked the debut appearance in the final for Forest Rangers and Maestro United. The Football Association of Zambia (FAZ) organizes the event and represents the 17th final of the annual knock-out competition in Zambian football. The tournament involved six teams from the Super League and the top two teams from the National Division One, following the conclusion of match day 17 of the 2022–23 season. Notably, this final also marked the fourth occasion that the competition was held under the ABSA Cup name. The match stood out as a groundbreaking moment for Zambian football, as it became the first-ever competitive game in the country to feature video assistant referee (VAR) technology. This milestone marked Zambia's introduction to VAR and established the nation as the pioneer of VAR implementation in Sub-Saharan Africa. Remarkably, Zambia joined the ranks of Morocco and Egypt as one of the only three African countries to successfully integrate VAR into their domestic matches.

Forest Rangers emerged victorious in the highly anticipated final, securing a 2-0 victory over the crowd's favourite, FC MUZA. The match saw Quadri Kola's goal and Chanda Chileshe's unfortunate own goal during the first half, which proved sufficient to secure the win for Forest Rangers.

== Road to the final ==
Forest Rangers		Round	Maestro United	
Opponent	Result	Knockout phase	Opponent	Result
Green Buffaloes	1–0	Quarter-finals	Red Arrows	2–0
Power Dynamos	2–1	Semi-finals	Trident FC	1–0

== Match ==
=== Details ===
27 May 2023
15:00 CAT (UTC+02:00)

Forest Rangers	2–0	Maestro United Zambia
15' Chanda Chileshe(o.g.); 62' Quadri Kola	Report

Woodlands Stadium, Lusaka
Attendance: 10,000
Referee: Amin Mohamed Omar (Egypt)
