= 2025 Zambian Charity Shield =

Power Dynamos	ZESCO United
0	2
- Date: 10 August 2025
- Venue: Levy Mwanawasa Stadium, Ndola
- Man of the Match: David Simukonda (ZESCO United)
- Attendance: 35,217

The 2025 Zambian Charity Shield was the 60th edition of the Zambian Charity Shield, an annual association football match contested by the winners of the previous season's Zambia Super League and the ABSA Cup. It was played at the Levy Mwanawasa Stadium in Ndola on 10 August 2025, and featured the 2024–25 Zambia Super League champions Power Dynamos and the 2025 ABSA Cup winners ZESCO United.

ZESCO United won the match 2–0, with goals from David Simukonda and Pascal Phiri, securing their sixth Charity Shield title.

== Background ==
Power Dynamos qualified for the 2025 Charity Shield as the winners of the 2024–25 Zambia Super League, while ZESCO United qualified as the winners of the 2025 ABSA Cup. It was the first meeting between the two teams in a Charity Shield final since 2021, and marked ZESCO United’s return to the fixture after missing out in the 2024 edition.

== Festival format ==
For the first time, the Zambian Charity Shield was held as a two-day football festival, with four matches on the final day (10 August 2025) at Levy Mwanawasa Stadium. Alongside the men’s main fixture, the day included two women’s matches and an additional curtain-raiser.

=== Women’s Charity Shield ===
- Green Buffaloes Women 3–2 ZESCO Ndola Girls – Hellen Chanda scored twice, and Evarine Katongo added a third for Buffaloes, ending ZESCO Ndola Girls’ 34-match unbeaten run. Green Buffaloes Women became the first team to successfully defend the.

== Match ==
=== Summary ===
ZESCO United took control early, opening the scoring through David Simukonda in the 23rd minute after a swift counterattack. Power Dynamos pressed for an equaliser but were held off by a resolute ZESCO defence. In the second half, Pascal Phiri doubled the lead with a powerful strike in the 68th minute, sealing the victory for the Ndola-based side. The win ended Power Dynamos’ hopes of securing back-to-back Charity Shield titles.

=== Details ===
10 August 2025
15:00 CAT

Power Dynamos	0–2	ZESCO United
		Simukonda 23'; Phiri 68'

Levy Mwanawasa Stadium, Ndola
Attendance: 20,000

== See also ==
- 2025 ABSA Cup
- 2024–25 Zambia Super League
