= List of football stadiums in Zambia =

This is a list of football stadiums in Zambia, ranked in descending order of capacity Some stadiums are football-specific and some are used for other purposes. A minimum capacity of 5,000 is required.

== Current stadiums ==
#	Image	Stadium	Capacity	City	Home team
1		National Heroes Stadium	60,000	Lusaka	National team
2		Levy Mwanawasa Stadium	49,800	Ndola	ZESCO United
3		Independence Stadium	30,000	Lusaka	Green Buffaloes F.C.
4		Nchanga Stadium	20,000	Chingola	Nchanga Rangers
5		Woodlands Stadium	15,000	Lusaka	City of Lusaka F.C.
6		Garden Park	10,000	Kitwe	Kitwe United Football Club
7		Nkoloma Stadium	10,000	Lusaka	Red Arrows F.C.
8		Nkana Stadium	10,000	Kitwe	Nkana F.C.

== Proposed stadiums ==
Stadium	Capacity	City	Home team	Status	Opening
New Lusaka Stadium	70,000	Lusaka	National team	Abandoned	N / A
New Livingstone Stadium	50,000	Livingstone	National team	Abandoned	N / A

== Razed stadiums ==
Stadium	Capacity	City	Home team
Dag Hammarskjöld Stadium	18,000	Ndola	Ndola United FC

== See also ==
- List of African stadiums by capacity
- List of association football stadiums by capacity
- List of association football stadiums by country
- List of sports venues by capacity
- List of stadiums by capacity
- Lists of stadiums
- Football in Zambia
