= 2023 ABSA Cup =

16th edition of the Absa Cup

2023 Absa Cup
Tournament details
- Country: Zambia
- Dates: 11 March – 25 April
- Teams: 8

Final positions
- Champions: Forest Rangers (1st title)
- Runners-up: Maestro United Zambia

Tournament statistics
- Matches played: 6
- Goals scored: 9 (1.5 per match)
- Top goal scorer: Cephas Mulombwa (3 goals) (Forest Rangers)

The 2023 Absa Cup was the 16th edition of the annual knock-out competition in Zambian football contested by the top 6 teams from the Super League and the top 2 teams from the National Division One following the conclusion of match day 17 of the 2022–23 season. It was also the 4th edition under the "Absa Cup" name following Absa's completed acquisition of the African assets and operations of Barclays in 2018.

NAPSA Stars were defending champions after defeating Red Arrows 1–0 to win the previous edition's title. but failed to qualify for this edition after finding themselves in 11th place in the standings mid-season.

The video assistant referee (VAR) was introduced to the competition and implemented on a pilot basis at this edition's final, which was a first in Zambian football and Sub-Saharan African football as a whole and thus put Zambia on the list as the 3rd African country after Morocco and Egypt to introduce and implement VAR in domestic football matches. Head of referees at FAZ, Aziph Banda, cited the inadequacy of FIFA-certified referees to operate it, with female referee Diana Chikotesha being the only exception having previously experienced its usage at the 2022 Women's Africa Cup of Nations and Janny Sikazwe having retired from professional refereeingas the reason why the association appointed foreign referees solely for that final, which was won by Forest Rangers

== Draw ==
At the conclusion of match day 17 of the 2022–23 Zambian football season, the Super League table's top 6 positions consisted of Forest Rangers, Red Arrows, Power Dynamos, Green Buffaloes, Green Eagles and Maestro United and the National Division One table's top 2 positions consisted of Mufulira Wanderers and Trident FC.

The draw was held at a relocated headquarters of Absa Bank Zambia in Lusaka on 1 March 2023. Green Buffaloes, Green Eagles, Red Arrows and Power Dynamos were seeded by virtue of their performances in the previous editions of the Absa Cup with Mufulira Wanderers, Trident FC, Maestro United and Forest Rangers being unseeded.

=== Bracket ===
Quarter-finals
11 March 13:00 Woodlands Stadium
Green Buffaloes	0
Forest Rangers	1
11 March 11:00 Woodlands Stadium
Power Dynamos	1
Mufulira Wanderers	0
12 March 13:00 Woodlands Stadium
Green Eagles	0
Trident FC	1
12 March 15:00 Woodlands Stadium
Red Arrows	0
Maestro United Zambia	2

Semi-finals
8 April Arthur Davies Stadium
Forest Rangers	2
Power Dynamos	1
9 April Arthur Davies Stadium
Trident FC	0
Maestro United Zambia	1

Final
20 May Woodlands Stadium
Forest Rangers	2
Maestro United Zambia	0

== Matches ==
Kick-off times listed are in CAT (UTC+02:00).

=== Quarter-finals ===
11 March 2023
13:00

Green Buffaloes	0–1	Forest Rangers
	Report	64' Cephas Mulombwa

Woodlands Stadium, Lusaka

11 March 2023
15:00

Power Dynamos	1–0	Mufulira Wanderers
39' Jacob Kaunda	Report

Woodlands Stadium, Lusaka

12 March 2023
15:00

Green Eagles	0–1	Trident FC
	Report	84' Peter Musukuma

Woodlands Stadium, Lusaka

12 March 2023
15:00

Red Arrows	0–2	Maestro United Zambia
	Report	4' Gift Simanansa; 22' Andrew Phiri (pen.)

Woodlands Stadium, Lusaka

=== Semi-finals ===
8 April 2023
15:00

Power Dynamos	1–2	Forest Rangers
6' Fredrick Mulambia	Report	70' Wisdom M. Libamba; 33' Cephas Mulombwa

Arthur Davies Stadium, Lusaka

9 April 2023
15:00

Trident FC	0–1	Maestro United Zambia
	Report	81' Whiteson Songwe (o.g.)

Arthur Davies Stadium, Lusaka

=== Final ===
20 May 2023
15:00

Forest Rangers	2–0	Maestro United Zambia
15' Chanda Chileshe (o.g.); 62' Quadri Kola	Report

Woodlands Stadium, Lusaka
Attendance: 10,000
Referee: Amin Mohamed Omar (Egypt)

== Prize allocation and logistics ==
Absa Bank Zambia announced a tournament prize and logistical monetary increment a day before the draw ceremony, i.e. on 28 February 2023 which are as follows:

Reason	Amount
Qualified teams	K20,000
Travel grant	K20,000 (home teams); K30,000 (away teams)
Champions	K700,000
Runners-up	K350,000
Top-scorer	K25,000
Golden Glove	K25,000
Player of the Tournament	K25,000
Coach of the Tournament	K25,000
Man of the Match	K25,000
