= Football cup competitions in Zambia =

According to records from the RSSSF, there were many association football cup competitions organized in Zambia since 1962, some of which are the Independence Cup, the Zambian Challenge Cup (both organized in 1961), the Champion of Champions Cup (organized in 1974) and Zambian Coca-Cola Cup, the latter which began in 2001. These competitions are either inactive or were played no more as of 2009.

== Independence Cup ==
The Northern Rhodesia Castle Cup, rebranded two years later as the Independence Cup due to the independence of Zambia, was launched in 1962 by the Football Association of Zambia as the top knockout tournament in Zambian football. Until 1965, the winners of this competition were pitted against the winners of the cup competition in Southern Rhodesia (now Zimbabwe) in the "Super Castle Cup" (the equivalent of today's super cups).

Its winners did not always enter the African Cup Winners' Cup; an entry was often reserved for the winners of the African Cup of Champions Clubs (now the CAF Champions League) which usually contested between four clubs.

It got rebranded as the Mosi Cup in 1993 and has not been played or organized since its last edition in 2007.

=== Northern Rhodesia Castle Cup ===
- 1961 : City of Lusaka
- 1962 : Roan United
- 1963 : Mufulira Blackpool

=== Independence Cup ===
- 1964 : City of Lusaka
- 1965 : Mufulira Wanderers
- 1966 : Mufulira Wanderers
- 1967 : Kabwe Warriors
- 1968 : Mufulira Wanderers
- 1969 : Kabwe Warriors
- 1970 : Ndola United
- 1971 : Mufulira Wanderers
- 1972 : Kabwe Warriors
- 1973 : Mufulira Wanderers
- 1974 : Mufulira Wanderers
- 1975 : Mufulira Wanderers
- 1976 : Mufulira Blackpool
- 1977 : Roan United
- 1978 : Nchanga Rangers
- 1979 : Power Dynamos
- 1980 : Power Dynamos
- 1981 : Vitafoam United
- 1982 : Power Dynamos
- 1983 : Konkola Blades
- 1984 : Kabwe Warriors
- 1985 : Strike Rovers
- 1986 : Nkana Red Devils
- 1987 : Kabwe Warriors
- 1988 : Mufulira Wanderers
- 1989 : Nkana Red Devils
- 1990 : Power Dynamos
- 1991 : Nkana Red Devils
- 1992 : Nkana

=== Mosi Cup ===
- 1993 : Nkana
- 1994 : Roan United
- 1995 : Mufulira Wanderers
- 1996 : Roan United
- 1997 : Power Dynamos
- 1998 : Konkola Blades
- 1999 : Zamsure
- 2000 : Nkana
- 2001 : Power Dynamos
- 2002 : Zanaco
- 2003 : Power Dynamos
- 2004 : Lusaka Celtic
- 2005 : Green Buffaloes
- 2006 : ZESCO United
- 2007 : Red Arrows

== Champion of Champions Cup ==
The Champion of Champions Cup was a cup competition in Zambian football active from 1974 to 1993. It was played by the teams who finished in the top 4 places in the country's football league system (the equivalence of the "GHALCA Top 4" in Ghana). It was named under various sponsorships; Cadbury Schweppes (1974-1975), the Zambian State Lottery (1976–78) and the Zambia Railways (1979). The winners of this competition occasionally get invited to compete in the African Cup Winners' Cup.

- 1974: Mufulira Wanderers
- 1975: Green Buffaloes
- 1976: Mufulira Wanderers
- 1977: Mufulira Wanderers
- 1978: Mufulira Wanderers
- 1979: Green Buffaloes
- 1980: Power Dynamos
- 1981: Power Dynamos
- 1982: Green Buffaloes
- 1983: Red Arrows
- 1984 Power Dynamos
- 1985 Mufulira Wanderers
- 1986 Vitafoam United or Nkana Red Devils
- 1987 Kabwe Warriors
- 1988 Mufulira Wanderers
- 1989 Kabwe Warriors
- 1990 Power Dynamos
- 1991 Kabwe Warriors
- 1992 Mufulira Wanderers
- 1993 Nkana Red Devils

== Zambian Challenge Cup ==
The Northern Rhodesian Challenge Cup is a currently-defunct knockout tournament in Zambian football created in 1962 and originally played by teams featuring all-white teams. Following Northern Rhodesia's independence as Zambia and the competition's rebranding as the Zambian Challenge Cup in 1964, it included teams featuring black people in the country.

The competition was contested by the top 8 teams of the country's league system (the equivalence of South Africa's MTN 8).

It was known by sponsorship names; the BAT Challenge Cup (1962–68), the Shell Challenge Cup (1969–1981) and the BP Challenge Cup/BP Top Eight Cup (since 1982) as sponsors withdrew from the country.

- 1962 : City of Lusaka
- 1963 : City of Lusaka
- 1964 : Rhokana United
- 1965 : Nchanga Rangers
- 1966 : Rhokana United
- 1967 : Mufulira Wanderers
- 1968 : Mufulira Wanderers
- 1969 : Mufulira Wanderers
- 1970 : Kabwe Warriors
- 1971 : Kitwe United
- 1972 : Kabwe Warriors
- 1973 : Nchanga Rangers
- 1974 : Roan United
- 1975 : Green Buffaloes
- 1976 : Nchanga Rangers
- 1977 : Green Buffaloes
- 1978 : Mufulira Wanderers
- 1979 : Green Buffaloes
- 1980 : Ndola United
- 1981 : Green Buffaloes
- 1982 : Red Arrows
- 1983 : Roan United
- 1984 : Mufulira Wanderers
- 1985 : Green Buffaloes
- 1986 : Mufulira Wanderers
- 1987 : Zanaco
- 1988 : Zanaco
- 1989 : Kabwe Warriors
- 1990 : Power Dynamos
- 1991 : Kabwe Warriors
- 1992 : Nkana
- 1993 : Nkana
- 1994 : Mufulira Wanderers
- 1995 : Roan United
- 1996 : Mufulira Wanderers
- 1997 : Mufulira Wanderers
- 1998 : Nkana
- 1999 : Nkana
- 2000 : Nkana
- 2001 : Power Dynamos
- 2002 : Kabwe Warriors
- 2003 : Kabwe Warriors
- 2004 : Kitwe United
- 2005 : Kabwe Warriors
- 2006 : Zanaco
- 2007 : Kabwe Warriors
- 2008 : Lusaka Dynamos

== Zambian Coca-Cola Cup ==
The Zambian Coca-Cola Cup is a Zambian seasonal association football club tournament sponsored by Coca-Cola which was active from 2001 to 2007. It is succeeded by the Barclays Cup (now the ABSA Cup).

- 2001: Zanaco
- 2002: Chambishi Blackburn
- 2003: Power Dynamos
- 2004: Zanaco
- 2005: Forest Rangers
- 2006: Kabwe Warriors
- 2007: ZESCO United

== Sources ==
- History of the Zambian football cup competitions 1962–2008 via RSSSF
