= 2026 Zambian Charity Shield =

2026 Samuel ‘Zoom’ Ndhlovu Charity Shield
- Event: Zambian Charity Shield
| Power Dynamos | Red Arrows |
| 0 | 1 |
- Date: 20 September 2026
- Venue: Nkoloma Stadium, Lusaka

The 2026 Samuel ‘Zoom’ Ndhlovu Charity Shield was the 61st Samuel ‘Zoom’ Ndhlovu Charity Shield, an annual association football match contested by the winners of the previous season's Zambian Super League and ABSA Cup competitions. It was played between Power Dynamos and Red Arrows on 20 September 2026 at Nkoloma Stadium in Lusaka, Zambia.

Power Dynamos qualified for the fixture as the winners of the 2025–26 Zambian Super League, while Red Arrows qualified as the winners of the 2026 ABSA Cup. The two teams had also met in the ABSA Cup final earlier in 2026, with Red Arrows winning 2–0 at Levy Mwanawasa Stadium in Ndola.

Red Arrows won the match 1–0, with Ackim Mumba scoring the only goal from a free-kick in the 80th minute. Power Dynamos were awarded a penalty in stoppage time, but Charles Kalumba saved Ronel Manyanga's attempt to preserve Red Arrows' lead. The victory gave Red Arrows the Charity Shield title.

== Match ==
The match was played at Nkoloma Stadium in Lusaka. The official Zambian Premier League website listed the fixture for 15:00 on 20 September 2026. Power Dynamos had several opportunities during the first half. Red Arrows goalkeeper Charles Kalumba made a save in the opening stages, while Joshua Mutale came close to scoring shortly before half-time. Red Arrows made changes at half-time, with Yusuf Saddam Phiri and Angel Lubamba introduced for Paul Katema and Mumba Phiri.

The only goal of the match came in the 80th minute when Ackim Mumba scored from a free-kick to give Red Arrows the lead. Power Dynamos were awarded a penalty during stoppage time after Linos Makwaza was brought down inside the penalty area. Ronel Manyanga took the penalty, but Kalumba saved the attempt to preserve Red Arrows' lead. Red Arrows won the match 1–0 and were crowned Charity Shield winners.

=== Details ===
20 September 2026
15:00

| Power Dynamos | 0–1 | Red Arrows |
|---|---|---|
| | | Ackim Mumba 80' |

Nkoloma Stadium, Lusaka

== Women's Charity Shield ==
The 2026 Charity Shield programme also included a women's match between ZESCO Ndola Girls and Green Buffaloes Women. ZESCO Ndola Girls won the match 2–1. Elizabeth Mupeso opened the scoring for ZESCO Ndola Girls in the 13th minute. Fridah Kabwe doubled their lead in the 26th minute, before Ethel Chinyerere scored for Green Buffaloes in the 85th minute. The result gave ZESCO Ndola Girls their first Samuel ‘Zoom’ Ndhlovu Charity Shield title.

=== Details ===
20 September 2026
12:00

| ZESCO Ndola Girls | 2–1 | Green Buffaloes Women |
|---|---|---|
| Elizabeth Mupeso 13'; Fridah Kabwe 26' | Report | Ethel Chinyerere 85' |

Nkoloma Stadium, Lusaka

== See also ==
- Zambian Charity Shield
- ABSA Cup
- Zambian Super League
- Samuel Ndhlovu
