= Adhunogor Union =

Union in Chattogram Division, Bangladesh

Adhunagar Union আধুনগর
- Union Council
- Location in Bangladesh
- Coordinates: 21°58′51″N 92°4′47″E
- Country: Bangladesh
- Division: Chittagong Division
- District: Chittagong District Lohagara Upazila

Government
  - Chairman: Alhaj Mohammad Nazim Uddin

Area
  - Total: 18.51 km^{2} (7.15 sq mi)

Population (1991)
  - Total: 20,575
  - Density: 1,112/km^{2} (2,879/sq mi)
- Time zone: UTC+6 (BST)
- Postal code: 4398

Adhunagar Union (Bengali: আধুনগর ইউনিয়ন) is a union parishad of Lohagara Upazila, Chittagong District, Bangladesh. It is surrounded by rivers, hills, green ornaments and natural reservoirs. The Dolu River, Uzir Deba and the nearby Kazir Deba and the adjacent Rafiya Mura, both sides of the Cox's Bazar highway, are very interesting.

In spite of being near Rafiya Mura habitat, there are porcupine, foxes, rabbit, monkeys, wild cat and moorfowl/wild cock and occasionally the deer's free behavior is seen. Any kind of hunting is here totally forbidden.

== History ==
This area was named Adunagar under the name of Mughal Subadar Adu Khan. Later it became known as Adhunagar.

== Geography ==
The area of the Adhunagar union is 4,574 acres (18.51 km^{2}).

The location of the Adhunogor Union in the western part of Lohagara Upazila. The distance of the union from Lohagara upazila headquarters is about 2 kilometers. Chunati Union on the south of the union; Putibila Union and Lohagara Union before; Amirabad Union on the north, Sonakania Union of Satkania Upazila and Barhatia Union of Lohagara Upazila and Chambal Union of Banskhali Upazila on the west. Note that the hills and Tila with red soil of Chittagong-Cox's Bazar highway are visible from the Hazir rastar matha (a road circle name) in this area...

Dolu River and Tonkaboti River pass through the mid-union. Also flowing through it are the river Adhunagar, and the Adhunagar Kulpagali canal, Hangor Canal and Hatia Canal also.

== Population ==
According to the 2011 figures, 20,575 people of the union parishad. Males constitute 10,143 and females 10,432.

== Economy ==
Until 1991, the vast majority of people in this area were dependent on agriculture. This area is now known as the businessman and Saudi Arab expatriate area. Currently the main source of income in this region is foreign currency. This area is suitable for fish farming because of this many fisheries farms have been developed.

=== Agriculture ===
All fertile crops are cultivated due to the fertile soil being close to the higher land and hills.

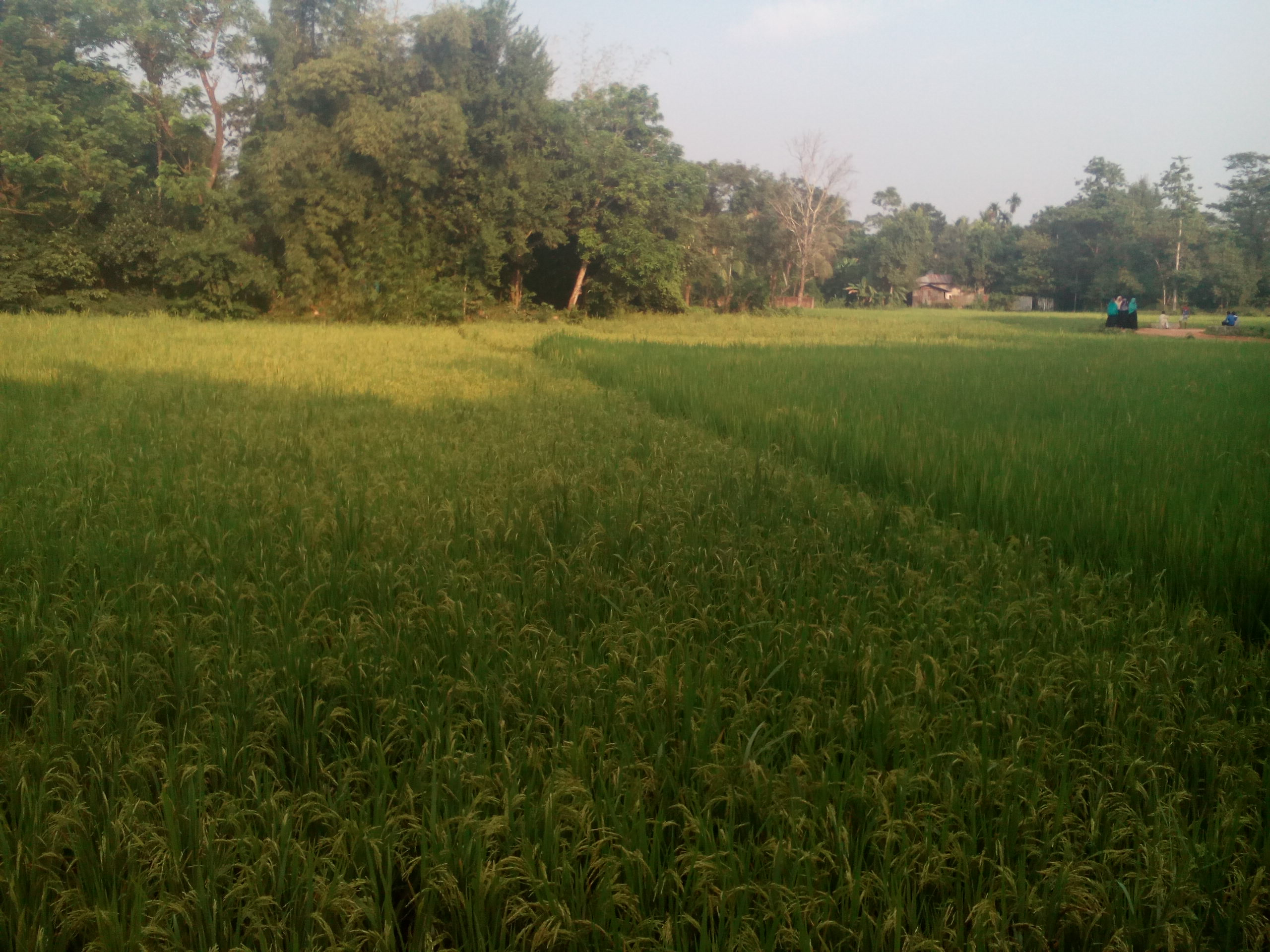
The Paddy Farm

Besides the major crops, rice is famous for its use of sugarcane, watermelon, fennel pulses and chilli. Winter varieties of vegetables are cultivated here in the winter season.

=== Village market ===
The main hats / markets of the Adhunagar Union are the Adhunagar Khan Hat Market and the Adhunagar Hatiar Kul Market. Also in the month of Baishakh a village fair called 'Surjykola' has existed for more than hundred years.

== Points of interest ==
- Ujir Deba (Lake)
- Kazir Deba (Lake)

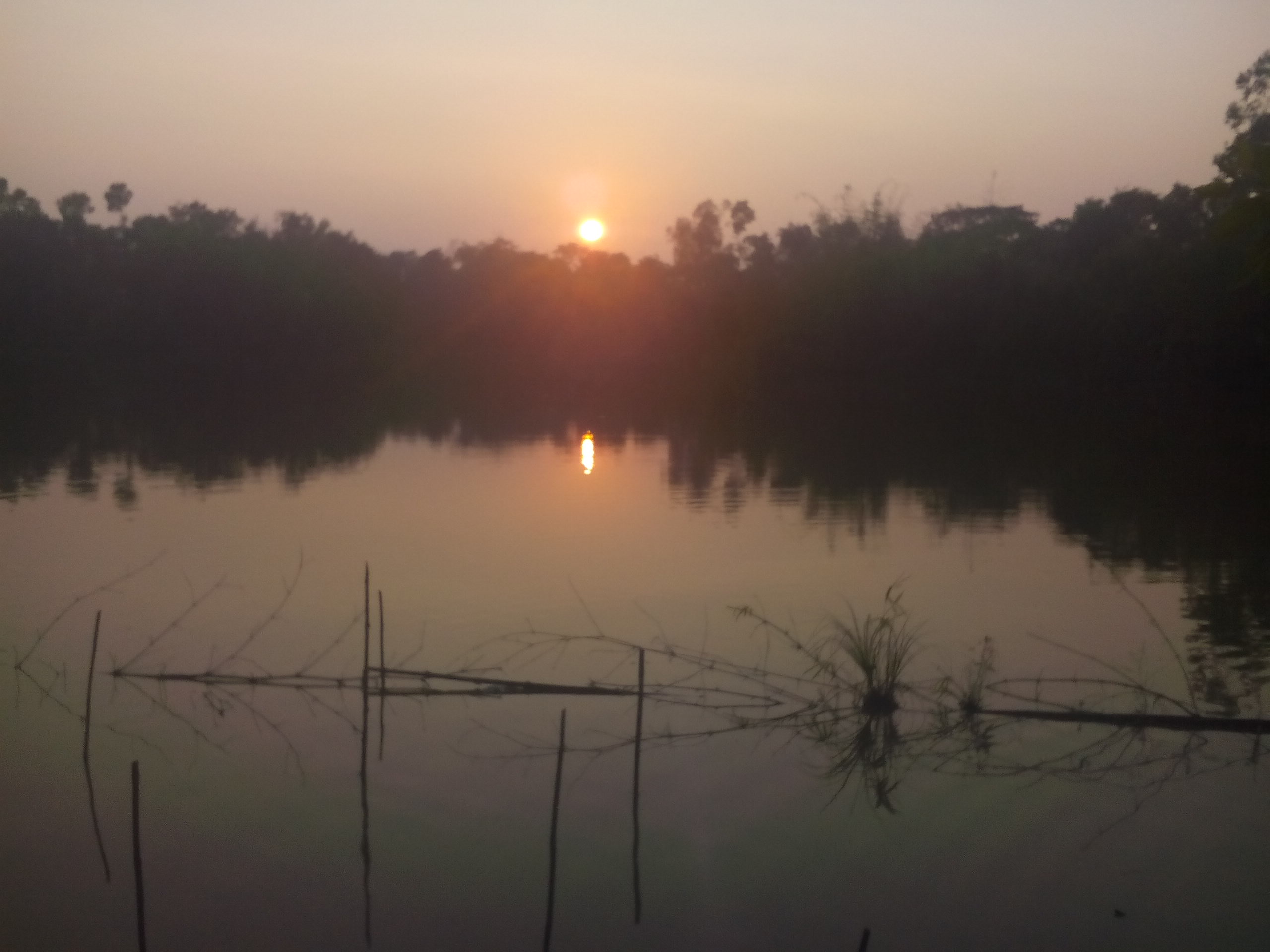
Sunset in Kazi Deva

- Rafiya Mura (Raiksha Mura)

=== Religious place of worship ===
There are 49 mosques, 3 temples and 3 Buddhist monasteries in the Adhunagar Union.

== Administration ==
The Adhunagar Union Parishad No 9 under the control of Lohagara Upazila. The administrative activities of the union are under the control of Lohagara Police Station. This section of the constituency Chittagong-15 of 292 constituencies of the Union Jatiya Sangsad (National Parliament of Bangladesh).. This union is divided into 3 mouzas and 9 wards.

The villages of the ward-based union are:

Ward No	Name Of Villages
No 1	Adhunagar, Horina
No 2	Satgarh
No 3	Masdia
No 4	Petan Para, Nur Mohammad Para
No 5	Mianzi Para
No 6	Jan Mohammad Sikdar Para, Hazir Para
No 7	Noapara
No 8	Uttar Para
No 9	Khan Mohammad Para

=== Local government ===
- Current chairman: Mohammad Nazim Uddin

List of Chairmen

Serial number	List of Chairmen	Duration
01	Moulavi Siddiq Ahmad Chy	1971-1973
02	Nurul Hoque Chy	1973-1984
03	Moulana Shafiq Ahmad	1984-1992
04	Mohammad Ayub Mia	1902-1998
05	Abu Zafar Chy	1998-2008
06	Sirajul Islam	2008-2013
07	Alhaz Mohammad Ayub Mia	2013-2020
08	Alhaz Mohammad Nazim Uddin	2020–present

== Communication system ==
The main road of communication between Adhunagar Union is Chittagong-Cox's Bazar Highway. All types of vehicles can be contacted.

== Education ==
The literacy rate of the Adhunagar Union is 47.73%. There are 1 Fazil Madrasa, 3 Secondary Schools, 1 Dakhil Madrasa, 1 Quami Madrasa, 1 Lower Secondary School, 9 Primary Schools and 4 Ebtedayi Madrasa in the Union.

Madrasa

- Adhunagar Islamia Fazil Madrasa
- Adhunagar Akhtaria Dakhil Madrasa
- Adhunagar Hafezia Sharifia Latifia Madrasa & Yatimkhana

Secondary school

- Adhunagar High School
- Adhunagar Gul-A-Zar Girls High School
- Rashider Ghona High School

Lower secondary school

- Hazi Mostaq Ahmad Chy High School

Primary school

- Adhunagar Damir Pukur Par Govt Primary School
- Adhunagar Govt Primary School
- Uttar Adhunagar Govt Primary School
- Uttar Horina Govt Primary School
- Dakshin Adhunagar Govt Primary School
- Dakshin Horina Govt Primary School
- Masdia Govt Primary School
- Rashider Ghona Govt Primary School
- Hazi Shamsul Islam Govt Primary School

Ebtedayi madrasa

- Dakshin Horina Darul Falah Shah Rashidia Ebtedayi Madrasa
- Rashider Ghona Shah Hafezia Rahmania Ebtedayi Madrasa
- Satgarh Shah Ataullah Ebtedayi Madrasa
- Hazrat Abu Huayra (R) Ebetedayi Madrasa

== See also ==
- Chunati Union
- Lohagara Upazila, Chittagong
- Chittagong District
