= Andrew Phiri =

Zambian footballer

Personal information
- Full name: Andrew James Phiri
- Date of birth: 21 May 2001 (age 25)
- Position: Forward

Team information
- Current team: FC MUZA

Senior career*
Years	Team	Apps	(Gls)
2021–	FC MUZA		

International career^{‡}
2022–2023	Zambia U23		
2023–	Zambia	1+	(0+)
- * Club domestic league appearances and goals as of 30 June 2025 ‡ National team caps and goals as of 2025

Andrew James Phiri (born 21 May 2001) is a Zambian professional footballer who plays as a forward for FC MUZA and the Zambia national football team.

== Club career ==
Phiri rose to prominence during the 2021–22 Zambian Division One season, scoring 16 goals for FC MUZA. He was the league’s *Newcomers Top Goalscorer* and also received the club’s *Player of the Year* award sponsored by Byta FM. Official statistics recorded 16 goals and 13 assists, with ten goals scored with his right foot, three with his left, and three headers. He finished one goal behind top scorer Christian Saile of the Democratic Republic of the Congo, helping MUZA earn promotion to the top flight

In the 2022–23 MTN Super League, Phiri scored 14 goals, finishing as MUZA’s second-highest scorer behind Andy Boyeli. His performances helped the club secure second place and qualify for the 2023–24 CAF Confederation Cup.

He also featured in the 2023 ABSA Cup final, having scored a penalty in the quarter-finals, before MUZA lost 2–0 to Forest Rangers. At the MTN Super League awards, he was named *Young Player of the Year*.

His performances attracted interest from foreign clubs, including Azam FC of Tanzania and TP Mazembe of the DR Congo.

== International career ==
Phiri represented the Zambia U23s in the qualifiers for the 2023 U-23 Africa Cup of Nations. Initially omitted from the provisional list, he was later added to the final 18-man squad. Zambia were eliminated by Egypt U23 in March 2023.

He received his first senior call-up in May 2023 for the AFCON 2024 qualifier against Ivory Coast, though he did not play. He later made his senior debut in the 2023 COSAFA Cup against Seychelles, coming on as a substitute in the 68th minute and receiving a yellow card in the 87th minute.

== Honours ==
=== FC MUZA ===
- Zambian Division One: runners-up (promotion) 2021–22
- MTN Super League: runners-up 2022–23
- ABSA Cup: runners-up 2023

=== Individual ===
- Zambia Division One Newcomers Top Goalscorer: 2021–22.
- FC MUZA Player of the Year: 2021–22.
- Zambian Super League Young Player of the Year: 2023
- Zambia Super League joint second top scorer: 2023–24 (11 goals)
