= Dola =

Dola may refer to:

- Dola (mythology), protective spirits in Polish mythology
- Dola, Ohio, United States
- Dola, Shahdol, India
- Dola, Gabon, a department of Gabon
- Dola, Burkina Faso
- Dola Dunsmuir (1903–1966), Canadian socialite
- DOLA, the Department of Land Administration
- Dola, the international version of Doubao

== See also ==
- Dola Hill Stadium, Zambia
- Doli (disambiguation)
