= 2022 Zambian Charity Shield =

Lusaka Dynamos	Red Arrows
0	1
- Date: 13 August 2022
- Venue: Nkoloma Stadium, Lusaka

The 2022 Zambian Charity Shield (also known as The 2022 Atlas Mara Samuel ‘Zoom’ Ndhlovu Charity Shield for sponsorship reasons) was the 57th Charity Shield, an annual football match played between the winners of the previous season's Super League and the ABSA Cup winners. The match was played by Red Arrows the champions of the 2021–22 season and the winners of the 2021 ABSA Cup, Lusaka Dynamos. Joseph Phiri's first-half strike won the match securing a notable 1–0 over Lusaka Dynamos for Red Arrows.

== Final ==
13 August 2022
15:00

Lusaka Dynamos	0–1	Red Arrows
		Joseph Phiri 31'

Nkoloma Stadium, Lusaka
