= Doli =

Doli may refer to:

- Doli (character), recurring character in Lloyd Alexander's fantasy series The Chronicles of Prydain
- Doli (musical instrument), a type of drum
- Doli, Croatia, a village near Dubrovnik, Croatia
- Doli (vehicle), a type of litter used in South Asia
- Doli (film), a 1969 Indian Hindi-language film starring Rajesh Khanna and Babita
- Doli (1982 film), a 1982 Indian Hindi-language film
- Doli Akhter, a Bangladeshi swimmer
- Shkelzen Doli, an Albanian violinist
- Dolu, Azerbaijan, a village in Astara District, Azerbaijan
- Doli, Jodhpur, a large village located in Luni Tehsil of Jodhpur district, Rajasthan

== See also ==
- Dola (disambiguation)
