= Dolu =

Dolu may refer to:

- Dolu, Azerbaijan, village in Astara District
- Dulu, Razavi Khorasan, village in Iran
- Dolu, Romania, village in Zimbor, Romania
- Dolu (Almaș), a tributary of the river Almaș in Romania
- Dolu River, a river in Bangladesh
- Dolu (film), 2012 Azerbaijani war film
- Musa Dolu (born 1993), Turkish footballer
