= Winter Mumba =

Zambian footballer (died 1993)

Personal information
- Place of birth: Zambia
- Date of death: 27 April 1993
- Place of death: Atlantic Ocean, off Gabon
- Position: Defender

Senior career*
Years	Team	Apps	(Gls)
–1993	Power Dynamos		

International career
1991–1993	Zambia	2	(0)
- * Club domestic league appearances and goals

Winter Mumba (died 27 April 1993) was a Zambian footballer and who played as a defender for Power Dynamos and the Zambia national team.

== International career ==
Winter Mumba made two appearances for Zambia during 1992 Africa Cup of Nations qualification and 1994 FIFA World Cup qualification.

== Death ==
He was among those killed in the crash of the team plane in Gabon on 27 April 1993.

== Career statistics ==
=== International ===
As of match played 16 January 1993.

Appearances and goals by national team and year
National team	Year	Apps	Goals
Zambia	1991	1	0
Zambia	1992	0	0
Zambia	1993	1	0
Total		2	0

== Honours ==
Power Dynamos

- Zambian Independence Cup
  - Champions (1): 1990
- Zambian Challenge Cup
  - Champions (1): 1990
- African Cup Winners Cup
  - Champions (1): 1991
