= 2021 Zambian Charity Shield =

Lusaka Dynamos	Zesco United
0	4
- Date: 28 August 2021
- Venue: Woodlands stadium
- Man of the Match: Mukaka Chanda

The 2021 Zambian Charity Shield (also known as The Atlas Mara Samuel ‘Zoom’ Ndhlovu Charity Shield for sponsorship reasons) was the 56th Charity Shield, an annual football match played between the winners of the previous season's Super League Zesco United and ABSA Cup Lusaka Dynamos. The match was set to be played on 21 August and was later postponed to 28 August at Woodlands stadium. Nkana were the defending champions as winners of the 2020 Zambia Charity Shield, but did not qualify for this edition, as they failed to win either the Super League or the ABSA Cup. Due to the COVID-19 pandemic the match was played behind closed doors and televised live on Supersport 229, Variety 4 and GOtv Zambia platform. Zesco won the match 4–0, Zesco's club record scorer Jesse Jackson scored brace while Edward Lungu and Mukaka Chanda scored one goal each. The funds raised during the match will be given to St Lawrence Home for Vulnerable Children.

== Match ==
=== Summary ===
Zesco took the lead in the 5 minutes through Jesse Were when he headed Samson Mkandawire's cross at the far post. Mukuka increased the advantage after intercepting Duncan Otieno's pass to Moussa Lemisa inside the area in the 40th minute, Were made his brace in the 44th minute to give Zesco United 3-0 lead at the break. After the break Edward Lungu who made his competitive debut for Zesco when he came off the bench to score in the 89th minute.

=== Details ===
28 August 2021
15:00 CAT

Lusaka Dynamos	0–4	Zesco United
	Report	Jesse Were; Mukaka Chanda; Edward Lungu

Woodlands stadium, Lusaka
