= 2021 ABSA Cup =

Tournament details
- Country: Zambia
- Dates: 13 March – 25 April
- Teams: 8

Final positions
- Champions: Lusaka Dynamos
- Runners-up: ZESCO United

Awards
- Best player: Kelvin Mubanga Kampamba (ZESCO United)

The 2021 ABSA Cup was the 14th edition of the annual knock-out competition in Zambian football contested by teams from its top tiers and the second to be sponsored by Absa Group Limited following its completed acquisition of the African assets and operations of Barclays in 2018.

The top six teams from the Super League and the top two teams from the National Division One, after 17 games of the 2020/21 season qualified for the tournament. As the 2020 edition was cancelled due to the COVID-19 pandemic, the 2019 champions, ZESCO United are defending champions.

== Knockout stage ==
The qualified teams were Forest Rangers, Kabwe Warriors, Lusaka Dynamos, Prison Leopards, Zanaco F.C., ZESCO United from the Super League together with Kansanshi Dynamos and Konkola Blades from National Division One.

The draw was held at the Radisson Blu Hotel in Lusaka on 4 March:

=== Bracket ===
Quarter-finals
12:30 on 13th of March at Woodlands Stadium
Forest Rangers	0
Konkola Blades	1
15:00 on 13th of March at Woodlands Stadium
ZESCO United (p)	1(5)
Kansanshi Dynamos	1(4)
12:30 on 14th of March at Woodlands Stadium
Lusaka Dynamos (p)	1(3)
Prison Leopards	1(1)
15:00 on 14th of March at Woodlands Stadium
Zanaco F.C. (p)	2(6)
Kabwe Warriors	2(5)

Semi-finals
15:00 on 17th of April at Arthur Davies Stadium
Konkola Blades	0
ZESCO United	4
12:30 on 17th of April at Arthur Davies Stadium
Lusaka Dynamos	3
Zanaco F.C.	0

Final
15:00 on 24th of April at Woodlands Stadium
ZESCO United	0(1)
Lusaka Dynamos (p)	0(3)

== Final ==
24 April 2021
15:00

ZESCO United	0–0	Lusaka Dynamos
	Report
Penalties
Chama (penalty scored); Rusike (penalty missed); Kapumbu (penalty missed); Musakanya (penalty missed)	1-3	Tady Etekiama (penalty scored); Sikombe (penalty scored); Chabula (penalty missed); Mushure (penalty missed); Ndala (penalty scored)

Woodlands Stadium, Lusaka

== Prize awards ==
Best player of the tournament was awarded to Kelvin Mubanga Kampamba from ZESCO United.

Best coach of the tournament was awarded to Wedson Nyirenda from Lusaka Dynamos.

Reason	Amount
Qualified teams	20.000 Kwacha
Champions	600.000 Kwacha
Runners-up	250.000 Kwacha
Player of the Tournament	25.000 Kwacha
Coach of the Tournament	25.000 Kwacha
Man of the Match	15.000 Kwacha
