= Sipho Mumbi =

Zambian footballer

Personal information
- Date of birth: 20 February 1979 (age 47)
- Place of birth: Lusaka, Zambia
- Height: 5 ft 11 in (1.80 m)
- Position: Midfielder

Youth career
- 1998–1999: Tazara Express
- 2000–2002: Stratford Academy

Senior career*
Years	Team	Apps	(Gls)
2002–2004	Zanaco		
2005	Ajax Orlando Prospects	5	(2)
2006	Lusaka Dynamos		
2007	City of Lusaka		
2008	Petro do Huambo		
2009	Atlético do Namibe		
2010	Zamsure		
2010	Dolo Mando		
2010	Progresso		
2011	Académica Lobito		
2012–2014	NAPSA Stars		

International career
2003–2004	Zambia	2	(0)
- * Club domestic league appearances and goals

Sipho Mumbi (born 20 February 1983) is a Zambian former professional footballer who played as a midfielder.

== Club career ==
Born and raised in Zambia, Mumbi started his career at local club Tazara Express in Kapiri Mposhi before relocating to the United States, playing college soccer for Stratford Academy. After two years he returned to Zambia, joining Zanaco and winning the Zambian Premier League title in his second season with the club. Mumbi helped his team to win the Zambian Charity Shield as well as the Zambian Coca-Cola Cup a year later, earning his first caps for the Zambian national team in the process.

In 2005, Mumbi returned to the United States to compete in the USL Premier Development League playing for Ajax Orlando Prospects, the farm team of Dutch club Ajax Amsterdam. He made five league appearances while scoring twice in one season with Ajax, before returning to Zambia and joining Lusaka Dynamos. Playing in the Zambian Premier League once more, Mumbi remained with the Dynamos for one season, before joining crosstown rivals City of Lusaka.

In 2008, Mumbi joined Petro do Huambo competing in the Girabola, the top flight of football in Angola. After one season he returned to Zambia, playing for Zamsure for six months. He then joined Dolo Mando in India for six months, before returning to Angola to join Progresso.

In 2012, Mumbi joined NAPSA Stars in Zambia, competing in the CAF Champions League, and helping his team to win the 2012 Barclays Cup.

== International career ==
Mumbi played for Zambia at various youth levels. He has also played for the senior team on several occasions, playing in the Africa Cup of Nations qualifying matches against Botswana and Rwanda.

== Honours ==
Zanaco

- Zambian Premier League: 2003
- Zambian Coca-Cola Cup: 2004
- Zambian Charity Shield: 2003

NAPSA Stars

- Barclays Cup: 2012
