= 2024 Zambian Charity Shield =

- Event: 2024 Zambian Charity Shield
Red Arrows	Kabwe Warriors
4	1
- Date: 10 August 2024
- Venue: Levy Mwanawasa Stadium, Ndola
- Man of the Match: Ricky Banda

The 2024 Zambian Charity Shield (also known as The 2024 Samuel ‘Zoom’ Ndhlovu Carling Black Label Charity Shield for sponsorship reasons) was the 59th Charity Shield match, an annual football event played between the winners of the previous season's Super League and the ABSA Cup winners. The Charity Shield match served as the dress rehearsal to kick off the 2024/25 Super League. The match was contested by Red Arrows, the league champions of the 2023/24 season, and Kabwe Warriors, the 2024 ABSA Cup tournament and was played at the Levy Mwanawasa Stadium in Ndola. Red Arrows emerged victorious with a 4-1 win over Kabwe Warriors.

== Match ==
=== Summary ===
Kabwe Warriors began the match strongly, creating an early chance when Akakulubelwa Mwachiaba's header forced Red Arrows' goalkeeper Charles Kalumba into a save just 30 seconds into the game. Warriors continued to press but were unable to convert their opportunities, with Francis Banda and Ackim Mumba both missing chances. Red Arrows came close to scoring in the first half when James Chamanga's shot hit the post. Kabwe Warriors also threatened, but Kalumba made a crucial save to keep the match level at halftime.

In the second half, Red Arrows made a triple substitution, introducing Onyumbe, Alassane Diara, and Lazarus Chishimba. This tactical change soon paid off as Red Arrows were awarded a penalty in the 51st minute, which Ricky Banda converted to give them a 1-0 lead. Banda then scored his second goal in the 64th minute, extending the lead to 2-0. Red Arrows continued to dominate, with new signing Angel Lubamba scoring their third goal in the 71st minute. Michee Malonga Gesimo added a fourth with a long-range strike in the 81st minute. Kabwe Warriors managed to pull one goal back in the 85th minute through Mwamba Mutombo, but it was not enough to change the outcome.

=== Details ===
11 August 2024
15:00 UTC+2

Red Arrows	4-1	Kabwe Warriors
R. Banda 51' pen' (64); A. Lubamba 74'; M. Gesimo 81'	Report	M. Mutombo 85'

Levy Mwanawasa Stadium, Ndola
Attendance: 12,784
