= Tenant Chilumba =

Zambian footballer and manager (born 1972)

Personal information
- Date of birth: 22 August 1972 (age 54)
- Place of birth: Mufulira, Zambia
- Position: Midfielder

Senior career*
Years	Team	Apps	(Gls)
–	Kabwe Warriors		
1994	Power Dynamos		
1996–1998	AmaZulu		
1998	Al Taawon		

International career
1990–1998	Zambia	24+	(3)

Managerial career
- 2004: Prison Leopards
- 2006: Young Arrows
- 2010–2012: Hwange Colliery
- 2013: F.C. Platinum
- 2014–2016: Power Dynamos
- 2016–2017: NAPSA Stars
- 2018–2019: Kabwe Warriors
- 2019-: Forest Rangers
- * Club domestic league appearances and goals

Tenant Chilumba (born 22 August 1972) is a Zambian football manager and former player currently coaching mufulira wanderers.

== Playing career ==
Born in Mufulira, Chilumba played football in the local league with Kabwe Warriors and Power Dynamos. He played professionally in South Africa and Saudi Arabia, with AmaZulu and Al Taawon.

Chilumba played for the Zambia national football team from 1990 to 1998. He was part of Zambia's African Cup of Nations teams in 1994 and 1998, helping the team reach the 1994 final in Tunisia and scoring a goal as they were eliminated in the 1998 group stage in Burkina Faso.

== Managerial career ==
After he retired from playing, Chilumba began a coaching career. He enjoyed success managing clubs in Zimbabwe, winning the 2012 ZIFA coach of the year with Hwange Colliery. More recently, he has managed in his native Zambia, leading Power Dynamos F.C., NAPSA Stars, and Kabwe Warriors F.C. He is currently managing Forest Rangers F.C.

== Career statistics ==
=== International ===
Scores and results list Zambia's goal tally first, score column indicates score after each Chilumba goal.

List of international goals scored by Tenant Chilumba
No.	Date	Venue	Opponent	Score	Result	Competition
1	27 August 1994	Cairo International Stadium, Cairo, Egypt	Egypt	1–0	4–0	Friendly
2	27 August 1994	Cairo International Stadium, Cairo, Egypt	Egypt	2–0	4–0	Friendly
3	9 February 1998	Stade Omnisports, Bobo-Dioulasso, Burkina Faso	Morocco	1–1	1–1	1998 Africa Cup of Nations
