= 2019–20 Zambian Charity Shield =

Zanaco	Zesco United
1	0
- Date: 17 August 2019
- Venue: Woodlands Stadium, Lusaka
- Man of the Match: Ziyo Tembo

The 2019–20 Zambian Charity Shield (also known as The Samuel ‘Zoom’ Ndhlovu Memorial Charity Shield) was the 54th Charity Shield, an annual football match played between the winners of the previous season's Super League and ABSA Cup. This was the second editions in 2019 due to the transitional from a calendar year season to a spring-fall season. This seasons’ Charity Shield match puts 2019 transitional Super League and ABSA Cup winners Zesco United against ABSA Cup runners up Zanaco. Before the 2019-20 Charity Shield final Zesco United featured in the previous 2019 final against Nkana, Zesco lost that match 5–4 on penalties. Zanaco defeated Zesco 1–0 with the only goal being scored by Ziyo Tembo. That defeat for Zesco United was the third consecutive season they have failed to win the Charity Shield, having lost the two previous to Nkana. The match was played at Woodlands Stadium on 17 August 2019.

== Match ==
=== Summary ===
Zesco made a bright start dominating the first ten minutes before Zanaco found their rhythm. Zanaco's first warning shot came from winger Charles Zulu who saw his 22nd minute free kick land on the roof of Zesco's net. Zanaco got it right on the next set-piece in the 39th minute when Lawrence Chungu floated the ball into the box and Ziyo was there to meet it and turn it past Zesco goalkeeper Dieudonne Ntibahezwa. But Zanaco were fortunate to have gone into the break leading after Jesse Were’s 43rd minute shot from a fine through ball from John Chingandu was flapped-out by Zanaco goalkeeper Mangani Banda. The second half then saw a flurry of changes on both sides but Zanaco again still looked the most likely to score. Ziyo was denied the opportunity of a brace in the 66th minute when he headed Tafadzwa Rusike’s free kick onto the post while Moussa Souleymanou saw his 69th minute long-range effort take a bounce and go wide.

=== Details ===
18 August 2019
15:00 CAT

Zanaco	1–0	ZESCO United
Ziyo Tembo 39'	Report

Woodlands, Lusaka
