= Lohagara Upazila =

Lohagara Upazila may refer to:

- Lohagara Upazila, Chittagong, Bangladesh
- Lohagara Upazila, Narail, Bangladesh
