= Chunati Government Women's College =

Degree college in Bangladesh

Location
- Chunati Union, Lohagara Upazila, Chittagong; Bangladesh; 21.9695°N 92.0721°E

Information
- Type: Degree College
- Established: 1989
- Principal: Muhammad Abu Naeem Azad

Chunati Government Women's College (Bengali: চুনতি সরকারি মহিলা কলেজ) is an educational institute from Chittagong in Bangladesh.

== Location ==
The college is located at Chunati Union of Lohagara Upazila, Chittagong.

== History ==
The college was established in 1989 but it becomes under government on 20 April 2017.

== Teaching staff ==
The head teacher of the institute is Muhammad Abu Naeem Azad.

== Education ==
It is an undergraduate level educational institution for only girls. It operates under National University. At present, besides the graduation (pass) course, honors course is also in this college.
