= 2024 ABSA Cup final =

- Event: 2024 ABSA Cup
Kabwe Warriors	Red Arrows
1	2
- Date: 12 May 2024
- Venue: Heroes Stadium, Lusaka
- Attendance: 35,000

The 2024 ABSA Cup final was an association football match played at Heroes Stadium in Lusaka, Zambia on May 12, 2024. The match was played between Red Arrows and Kabwe Warriors at Heroes Stadium. The event was organized by the Football Association of Zambia (FAZ) and represented the 18th final of the annual knock-out competition in Zambian football.The tournament involved six teams from the Super League and the top two teams from the National Division One, following the conclusion of match day 17 of the 2023–24 season. The Match was won by Red Arrows securing them a third title of the Absa Cup.

== Match ==
Heading into the final, Red Arrows were the favorites, needing only one point from their remaining four games to clinch the MTN Super League title. Kabwe Warriors, despite being underdogs, had shown excellent form in the ABSA Cup tournament. The match began with Red Arrows taking an early lead in the second minute, thanks to Ricky Banda’s goal from Ackim Mumba’s precise cross. Kabwe Warriors fought back, creating numerous chances but failing to convert. In the 42nd minute, Alassane Diarra doubled Red Arrows' lead, again assisted by Mumba.

Kabwe Warriors started the second half with renewed determination, and in the 52nd minute, Godfrey Binga scored to make it 2-1. The match intensified as Warriors pushed for an equalizer, but Red Arrows held firm, securing a 2-1 victory. Despite the loss, Kabwe Warriors' defender Killian Kanguluma was named Man of the Match. Alassane Diarra received the Best Player of the Tournament award, and Ricky Banda won the Golden Boot with four goals. Nchanga Rangers’ Victor Chabu earned the Golden Glove Award.

=== Details ===
12 May 2024
15:00 CAT (UTC+02:00)

Kabwe Warriors	1–2	Red Arrows
52' Godfrey Binga	Report	1' Ricky Banda; 42' Allasane Diarra

Heroes Stadium, Lusaka
Attendance: 35,000
