= Bara Aulia Degree College =

Degree college in Bangladesh

Location
- Amirabad Union, Lohagara, Chittagong; Bangladesh; 22.0416°N 92.1034°E

Information
- Type: Degree College
- Established: 1980
- Principal: Israt Armin (acting)
- Enrollment: 1500+
- Website: www.badc.edu.bd

Bara Aulia Degree College (Bengali: বার আউলিয়া ডিগ্রি কলেজ) is an educational institution in Chittagong District, Bangladesh.

== Location ==
The college is located in Amirabad Union of Lohagara Upazila of Chittagong District.

== History ==
It was established in 1980. It was founded by Alhaj Mohammad Aman Alam.

== Education ==
It is a graduate level educational institution.
