= Perphias Malekano =

Zambian footballer (born 1986)

Personal information
- Date of birth: 2 February 1986 (age 40)
- Position: Defender

Senior career*
Years	Team	Apps	(Gls)
2004–2007	Lusaka Celtic F.C.		
2008	City of Lusaka F.C.		

International career
2004	Zambia	2	(0)
- * Club domestic league appearances and goals

Perphias Malekano (born 2 February 1986) is a retired Zambian football defender. He played for Lusaka Celtic F.C and City of Lusaka F.C. He retired in 2008.
