= Lohagara Upazila, Chittagong =

Upazila in Chittagong Division, Bangladesh

Lohagara লোহাগাড়া
- Upazila
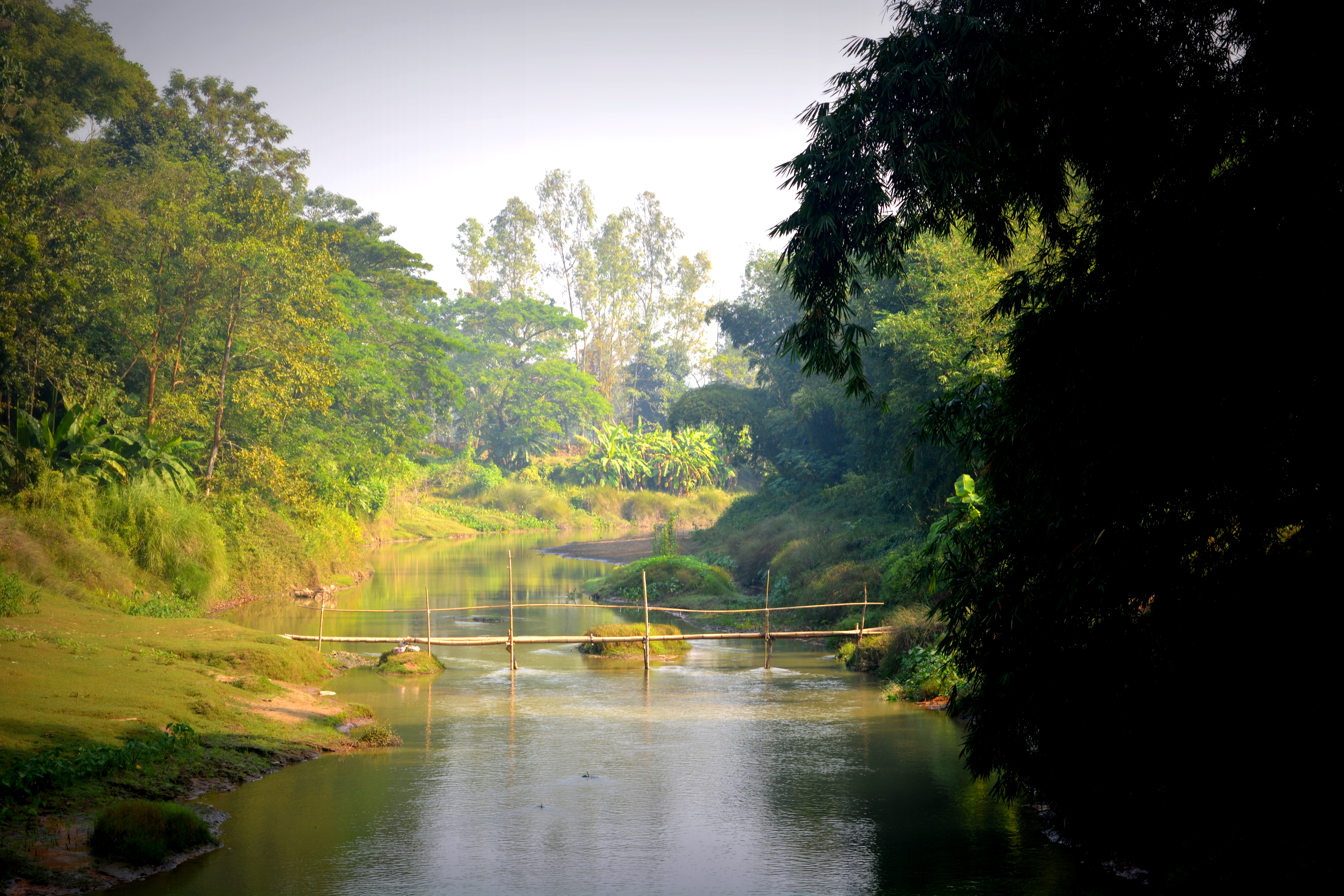
- Tonkaboti canal

- Coordinates: 22°0.5′N 92°6.3′E
- Country: Bangladesh
- Division: Chittagong
- District: Chittagong
- Jatiya Sangsad constituency: Chittagong-15
- Headquarters: Lohagara

Government
  - Body: Upazila Council
  - Chairman: Vacant

Area
  - Total: 258.87 km^{2} (99.95 sq mi)

Population (2022)
  - Total: 328,220
  - Density: 1,267.9/km^{2} (3,283.8/sq mi)
- Time zone: UTC+6 (BST)
- Postal code: 4396
- Website: lohagara.chittagong.gov.bd

Lohagara (Bengali: লোহাগাড়া) is an upazila of Chittagong District in Chittagong Division, Bangladesh. Lohagara is situated between Chittagong and Cox's Bazar. It is one of the largest and most densely populated upazilas of Bangladesh. It has headquarters in Lohagara.

== Etymology ==
In 1660, Mughal prince Shah Shuja took shelter in the Kingdom of Arakan to escape from Mir Jumla II. While heading to Arakan, he stayed in a beautiful hilly place (present-day Chunati) between Chittagong and Cox's Bazar for a few days. At the time of departure, he engraved an iron bar in that place as a sign. It is thought that because of engraving iron bar by Shah Shuja the area is called 'Lohagara' since 'Loha' means 'iron'.

== History ==
Lohagara was once under Satkania Upazila. Lohagara thana was formed in 1981 and it was turned into an upazila in 1983.

== Geography ==
Lohagara is located at 22.0083°N 92.1056°E. It has a total area of 258.87 square kilometres (99.95 sq mi). It is bordered by Satkania Upazila on the north, Chakaria and Lama Upazilas on the south, Bandarban Sadar and Lama Upazilas on the east and Banshkhali Upazila on the west. The noted canals are Tonkaboti, Dolu and Hangor.

=== Parks and greenery ===
- Chunati Wildlife Sanctuary
- Padua Forest Range
- Nasim Park, Putibila
- Chambi Lake, Chunati

== Demographics ==
Historical population
Year	Pop. (000)	±%
1981	165	—
1991	206	+24.8%
2001	267	+29.6%
2011	280	+4.9%
2022	328	+17.1%
Source: Bangladesh Bureau of Statistics

Religions in Lohagara Upazila (2022)
Religion	Percent
Islam	90.93%
Hinduism	7.22%
Buddhism	1.83%
Other or not stated	0.02%

According to the 2022 Bangladeshi census, Lohagara Upazila had 71,711 households and a population of 328,220. 11.97% of the population were under 5 years of age. Lohagara had a literacy rate (age 7 and over) of 82.41%: 84.22% for males and 80.83% for females, and a sex ratio of 89.66 males for every 100 females. 100,052 (30.48%) lived in urban areas.

As of the 2011 Census of Bangladesh, Lohagara upazila had 52,873 households and a population of 279,913. 74,420 (26.59%) were under 10 years of age. Lohagara had an average literacy rate of 49.19%, compared to the national average of 51.8%, and a sex ratio of 1062 females per 1000 males. 30,815 (11.01%) of the population lived in urban areas.

== Points of interest ==
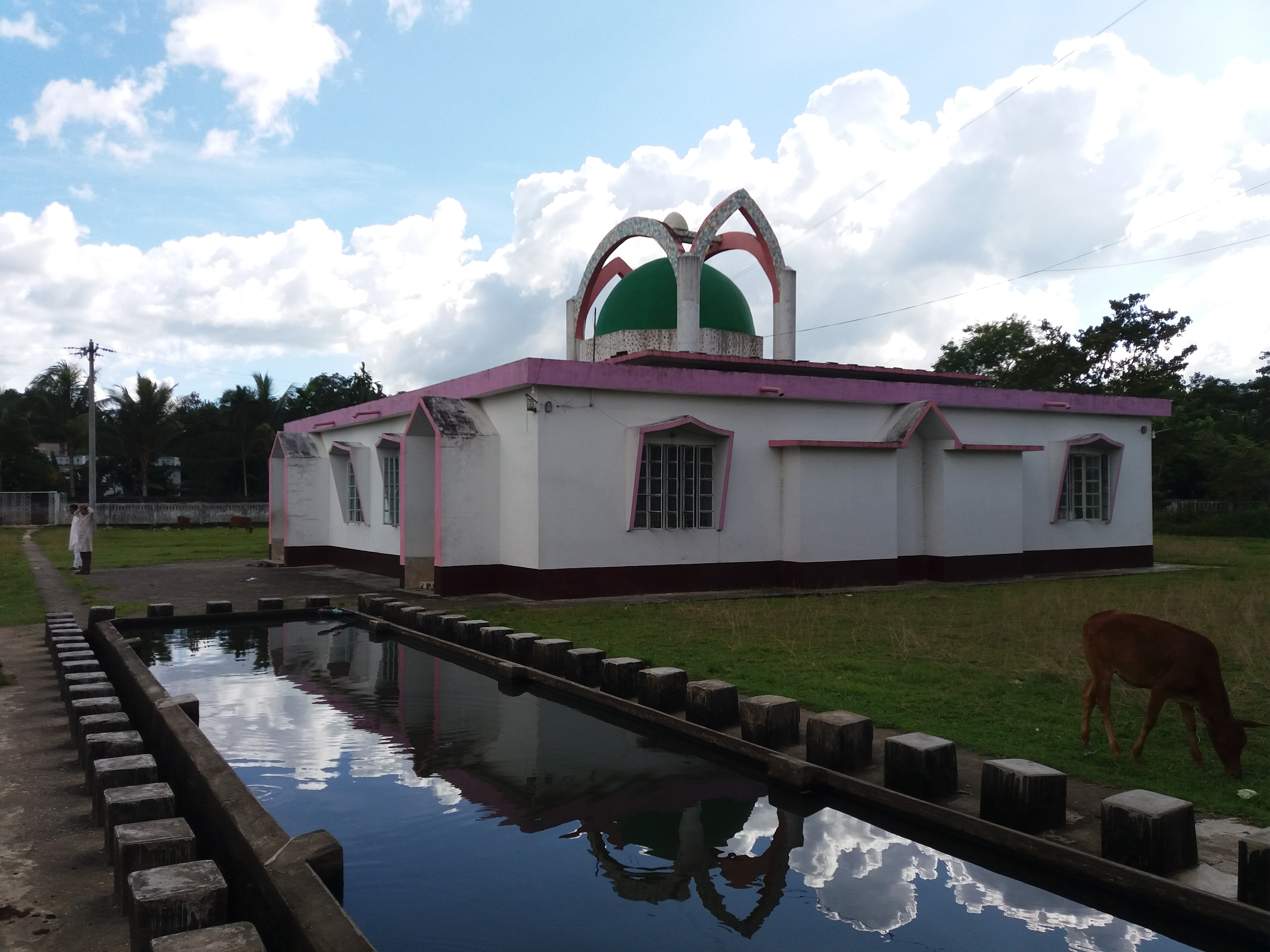
Shrine at Hafez Ahmad Shah Saheb

- Chunati Khan Mosque
- Upazila Memorial Museum
- Central Mosque
- Hafez Para Jame Mosque, Putibila
- Gupta Landlord House (Padua)
- Gupta Landlord House (Aduonagor)

== Administration ==
Lohagara thana was turned into an upazila in 1983.

Lohagara Upazila is divided into nine union parishads: Adhunagar, Amirabad, Putibila, Barahatia, Charamba, Chunati, Kalauzan, Lohagara, and Padua. The union parishads are subdivided into 40 mauzas and 43 villages.

== Education ==
There are three kamil madrasas, two degree colleges (two honors courses), one mohila College (the only government college in Lohagara Upazila), nine fazil madrasas, one technical college, one school and college, 1 alim madrasas, 25 secondary schools (1 govt), 18 dakhil madrasas, two quami madrasas, 10 lower secondary schools, 105 primary schools, 43 ebtedi madrasas, and 30 kindergartens.

=== Colleges and universities ===
- Alhaj Mostafizur Rahman University College
- Bara Aulia Degree College
- Mostafa Begum Girls Business Management College
- Chunati Government Women's College
- Ayub Foundation Technical College

=== Schools ===
- Lohagara Shahpir Pilot High School (1966)
- South Satkania [Amirabad] Golambari Government Model High School (1937)
- Amirabad Janakalyan High School (1970)
- North Amirabad M B High School (1932)
- Charamba High School(1968)
- Lohagara Suckchuri Uzir vita
- Putibila High School (1968)
- Gourstan High School, Putibila
- M. H. Nurul Alam Chowdhury Ideal High School (1994)
- Kalauzan Sukchari Gorsundar High School (1945)
- Adhunagar High School (1961)
- Padua A.C.M. High School (1963)
- Mustafa Begum Girls High School
- Chunati High School
- B G Senerhat High School
- Sukchari High School (1986)
- Kalauzan Dr. Yakub Bazlur Rahman Sikder High School
- Uttar Padua High School (1996)
- Lohagara Ideal School & College
- Iqra Abdul Jabbar High School (1988)
- Rashiderghona High School
- Barahatia Adarsha High School.(1973)
- M.M.S.H government primary school

=== Madrashas ===
- Amirabad Sufia Aliya Madrasah
- Rajghata Hossainia Azizul Uloom Madrasah, Amirabad
- Lohagara Islamia (Degree) Madrasah (1945)
- Adhunagor Islamia Kamil Madrasha, Adhunagor
- Barahatia Malpukuria Miaskatul Ulum Madrasah (1941)
- Chunati Hakimia Kamil (M.A) Madrasah
- Charamba jame ul ulom dakil Madrasha(1989)
- Al-Ihsan Academy, Lohagara (1997)
- South Sukchari Shah Abdul Khalek Fazil (degree) Madrasah
- Kalauzan Shah Rashidia Fazil (degree) Madrasah
- Barohatia Darul Quran Academy (2015)
- Putibila Hamedia Fazil (degree) Madrasah
- Allama Fazlullah (RAH.) Ideal Dhakil Madrasah Narischa (2001)
- Darul Arquam Academy (Dakhil Madrasah charamba) 2001
- Noarbila Kaderia Adarsha Dakhil Madrasah, Charamba

== Notable residents ==
- Mia Mohammad Zainul Abedin, Military Secretary to the Prime Minister (2011-2019), was born at Chunti village in 1960.
- Bulbul Chowdhury, pioneer of modern dance in Bangladesh, born in Chunati in 1919
- Major Nazmul Huq, Sector Commander, 7th sector of Bangladesh Liberation War (March to August 1971), born at Amirabad village in 1938
- Niaz Ahmed Khan, 30th vice-chancellor of the University of Dhaka, (September 28, 1966), born at Chunati village in 1966
