= Lohagara, Chittagong =

Lohagara লোহাগড়া
- Town
- Location in Bangladesh
- Coordinates: 22.0181°N 92.0974°E
- Country: Bangladesh
- Division: Chittagong Division
- District: Chittagong District
- Upazila: Lohagara Upazila

Area
  - Total: 9.78 km^{2} (3.78 sq mi)

Population (2011)
  - Total: 30,815
  - Density: 3,150/km^{2} (8,160/sq mi)
- Time zone: UTC+6 (BST)

Lohagara (Bengali: লোহাগড়া) is a town in Chittagong District in the division of Chittagong, Bangladesh. It is the administrative headquarters and urban centre of Lohagara Upazila.
