= New Livingstone Stadium =

Proposed stadium in Livingstone, Zambia

New Livingstone Stadium was a proposed multi-purpose stadium in Livingstone, Zambia, that was in the planning stages until Zambia backed out of hosting the 2011 All-Africa Games in December 2008, citing a lack of funds. It would have been used mostly for football matches and would have hosted some events for the 2011 All-Africa Games. The stadium would have had a capacity of 50,000 people. It was to be built along with new stadiums in Ndola (New Ndola Stadium) and Lusaka (New Lusaka Stadium).
