= Lawrence Mulenga =

Zambian footballer (born 1998)

Personal information
- Birth name: Tresford Lawrence Mulenga
- Date of birth: August 21, 1998 (age 28)
- Place of birth: Lusaka, Zambia
- Height: 1.95 m (6 ft 5 in)
- Position: Goalkeeper

Team information
- Current team: Power Dynamos
- Number: 1

Youth career
- Blue Bullets FC

Senior career*
Years	Team	Apps	(Gls)
2014–2018	Kabwe Warriors		
2018–	Power Dynamos		

International career^{‡}
2018–	Zambia	25	(0)
- * Club domestic league appearances and goals ‡ National team caps and goals as of 21 August 2026

Tresford Lawrence Mulenga (born 21 August 1998) is a Zambian professional footballer who plays as a goalkeeper for Power Dynamos and the Zambia national team.

== Career ==
Mulenga began his senior career with Kabwe Warriors in the Zambia Super League in 2014. In 2018, he moved to Power Dynamos. In 2023, he helped Power Dynamos win the 2022–23 Zambia Super League, and extended his contract with the club for 2 more seasons.

== International ==
Mulenga debuted with the senior Zambia national team in a 1–0 friendly win over Gabon on 211 September 2018. He was the backup goalkeeper for the Zambia teams that won the 2019 and 2022 COSAFA Cup. He was called up to the national team for the 2023 Africa Cup of Nations, where he was Zambia's starting goalkeeper.

On 10 December 2025, Mulenga was called up to the Zambia squad for the 2025 Africa Cup of Nations.

== Career statistics ==
=== International ===
As of match played 16 December 2025

Appearances and goals by national team and year
National team	Year	Apps	Goals
Zambia	2018	1	0
Zambia	2019	2	0
Zambia	2020	–	
Zambia	2021	–	
Zambia	2022	2	0
Zambia	2023	6	0
Zambia	2024	10	0
Zambia	2025	4	0
Total		25	0

== Honours ==
=== Club ===
Power Dynamos

- Zambia Super League: 2022–23

=== International ===
Zambia

- COSAFA Cup: 2019, 2022
