= Salulani Phiri =

Zambian footballer (born 1994)

Personal information
- Full name: Salulani Phiri
- Date of birth: 10 April 1994 (age 32)
- Place of birth: Lusaka, Zambia
- Height: 1.78 m (5 ft 10 in)
- Position: Midfielder

Team information
- Current team: Power Dynamos F.C.
- Number: 8

Senior career*
Years	Team	Apps	(Gls)
2012–2016	Zanaco		
2017–2021	Polokwane City	95	(13)
2021-2023	Zanaco F.C.	8	(0)
2023-	Power Dynamos F.C.	3	(0)

International career^{‡}
2015	Zambia U23	2	(0)
2012–	Zambia	29	(0)
- * Club domestic league appearances and goals as of 22/6/25 @ 15:51(AEST) ‡ National team caps and goals as of 03:39, 21 July 2018 (UTC)

Salulani Phiri (born 10 April 1994) is a Zambian international footballer who plays for Polokwane City, as a midfielder.

== Club career ==
Phiri began his career at Zambian Premier League club Zanaco in 2012, winning two Zambian Premier League titles during his time with the club.

In December 2016, after weeks of rumours, Phiri agreed a deal to sign with South African Premier Division club Polokwane City at the end of his contract with Zanaco.

== International career ==
On 5 December 2012, Phiri made his debut for Zambia in a 2–1 loss against Saudi Arabia.

In November 2015, Phiri was called up by Zambia U23 manager Fighton Simukonda for the 2015 Africa U-23 Cup of Nations in Senegal.

=== International goals ===
Scores and results list Zambia goal tally first.

No.	Date	Venue	Opponent	Score	Result	Competition
1.	8 June 2021	Stade de l'Amitié, Cotonou, Benin	Benin	1–1	2–2	Friendly

== Honours ==
Zanaco

- Zambian Premier League: 2012, 2016
