= 2020 Zambian Charity Shield =

Nkana	Indeni
2	0
- Date: 24 October 2020
- Venue: Arthur Davies Stadium, Kitwe
- Man of the Match: Idris Mbombo

The 2020 Zambian Charity Shield (also known as The Atlas Mara Samuel ‘Zoom’ Ndhlovu Charity Shield for sponsorship reasons) was the 55th edition of the Charity Shield, that took place on 24 October 2020 in Kitwe, Zambia. The annual football match is played between the winners of the Super League and the ABSA Cup. However, owing to the COVID-19 pandemic, the 2019–20 ABSA Cup did not take place. Consequently, the Football Association of Zambia had to select the winners of the second-tier league champions, Indeni, to participate in the event.

Nkana, winners of the Super League, made their 17th appearance in the Charity Shield final, while Indeni made their second appearance since 2000. The game took place at Arthur Davies Stadium, and owing to COVID-19 restrictions, it was played behind closed doors. However, the match was televised live on SuperSport for fans to enjoy.

Zanaco, the defending champions as winners of the 2019–20 Zambian Charity Shield, did not qualify for this edition as they failed to win the Super League. Nkana emerged victorious, winning 2–0, with both goals scored by Idris Mbombo. Mbombo was also named man of the match for his impressive performance.

== Background ==
The 2020–21 Charity Shield only featured the Super League champions, Nkana and the National Division One League champions, Indeni since the 2019–20 ABSA cup did not take place due to COVID-19.

== Match ==
=== Summary ===
The match started on a cagey note, with Indeni looking more enterprising but the first chance would fall to Nkana when Ramadhan Singano saw his effort come off the woodwork in the 17th minute. Four minutes later, Nkana broke the deadlock, with Idris Mbombo tapping home from close range from an assist by Patrick Gondwe after Indeni failed to clear a cross by Liaison Thole. Mbombo was again on hand to net his second of the match with an acrobatic effort from a rebound after goalkeeper Charles Lawu failed to deal with a Gondwe shot.

=== Details ===
24 October 2020
15:00 CAT

Nkana	2–0	Indeni
Idris Mbombo 21', 33'	Report

Arthur Davies Stadium, Kitwe
