= New Lusaka Stadium =

Planned multi-purpose stadium in Lusaka, Zambia

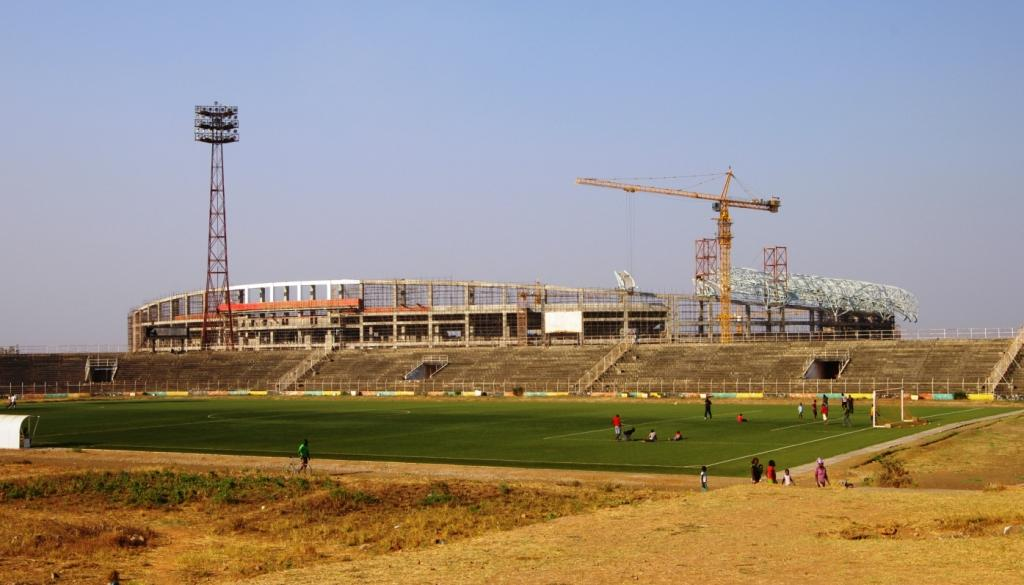
New Lusaka Stadium-Alex

New Lusaka Stadium was a planned multi-purpose stadium in Lusaka, Zambia that would have been used mostly for football matches and would have hosted some events for the 2011 All-Africa Games. The stadium would have had a capacity of 70,000 people. It would have replaced the Independence Stadium. It would have been built along with new stadiums in Ndola (New Ndola Stadium) and Livingstone (New Livingstone Stadium).

In December 2008, Zambia withdrew its hosting duties, citing a lack of funds.
