= Sipiyyəd =

- Village
- Location within Azerbaijan
- Country: Azerbaijan
- Rayon: Astara
- Municipality: Dolu
- Time zone: UTC+4 (AZT)
  - Summer (DST): UTC+5 (AZT)

Sipiyyəd is a village in the municipality of Dolu in the Astara Rayon of Azerbaijan.
