= 2025 ABSA Cup final =

2025 ABSA Cup Final
- Event: 2025 ABSA Cup
ZESCO United	Red Arrows
1	1
- ZESCO United won 4–2 on penalties
- Date: 10 May 2025
- Venue: Levy Mwanawasa Stadium, Ndola
- Referee: James Phiri
- Attendance: 30,425
- Weather: Sunny

The 2025 Absa Cup final was a football match played at Levy Mwanawasa Stadium in Ndola, Zambia, on 10 May 2025, between ZESCO United and Red Arrows to determine the winners of the 2025 Absa Cup. It was the 18th final of Zambia's premier domestic cup competition, organised by the Football Association of Zambia (FAZ).

This was ZESCO United's eighth appearance in the final, a tournament record, while Red Arrows, the defending champions, were seeking their third overall cup win. ZESCO won the match 4–2 on penalties after a 1–1 draw in regulation time, with goalkeeper Gregory Sanjase making two crucial saves in the shootout.

A first-half goal from Abraham Siankombo gave ZESCO the lead, but Red Arrows equalised early in the second half through Joseph Phiri. The victory earned ZESCO their seventh Absa Cup title, extending their record as the most successful club in the competition's history. For Red Arrows, this was their second consecutive Absa Cup final appearance.

== Route to the final ==
=== Zesco United ===
Zesco United's route to the final
Round	Opposition	Score
1/8 Finals	Barts FC (A)	3–1
Quarterfinals	Konkola Blades (N)	2–0
Semifinals	Nkana (N)	1–0
Key: (H) = Home venue; (A) = Away venue; (N) = Neutral venue

Zesco United entered the competition in the Round of 16. They began their campaign with a 3–1 victory over Barts FC in Kabwe, with goals from Lindo Mkhota, Peter Musukuma, and John Chingandu. In the quarterfinals, Zesco United defeated Konkola Blades 2–0 at a neutral venue in Kitwe, thanks to goals from Abraham Siankombo and Lindo Mkhota. In the semifinals at Levy Mwanawasa Stadium, a second-half goal from Peter Musukuma secured a narrow 1–0 win over Nkana to send Zesco into the final.

=== Red Arrows ===
Red Arrows' route to the final
Round	Opposition	Score
1/8 Finals	Mpulungu Harbour (A)	6–1
Quarterfinals	Green Eagles (H)	3–1
Semifinals	Power Dynamos (N)	1–0
Key: (H) = Home venue; (A) = Away venue; (N) = Neutral venue

Red Arrows also joined the tournament in the Round of 16, where they thrashed Mpulungu Harbour 6–1 with goals from Wilfred Sikanyika, Paul Katema, Saddam Yusuf Phiri, Noris Mubanga, Derrick Bulaya, and Angel Lubamba. In the quarterfinals at Nkoloma Stadium, Red Arrows secured a 3–1 win against Green Eagles, with goals by Sikanyika and Michee Malonga (who scored twice). A tight semifinal saw Joseph Phiri net the decisive goal in a 1–0 victory over Power Dynamos, sending Red Arrows into the final.

== Match ==
=== Summary ===
ZESCO United took the lead in the 28th minute through Abraham Siankombo, but Red Arrows equalized in the 53rd minute with a goal from Joseph Phiri. Both teams created chances but failed to break the deadlock, sending the game to penalties. ZESCO United converted all four of their spot-kicks, while Red Arrows missed two.

=== Details ===
10 May 2025
15:00 CAT
Final

ZESCO United	1–1 (4–2 pen.)	Red Arrows
Abraham Siankombo 28'		Joseph Phiri 53'
Penalties
(penalty scored) Peter Musukuma; (penalty scored) Lindo Mkhota; (penalty scored) Kelvin Kampamba; (penalty scored) John Chingandu	4–2	(penalty scored) Saddam Phiri; (penalty missed) Wilfred Sikanyika; (penalty scored) Derrick Bulaya; (penalty missed) Michee Malonga

Levy Mwanawasa Stadium, Ndola
Attendance: 30,425
Referee: James Phiri

== See also ==
- 2025 ABSA Cup
- ZESCO United F.C.
- Red Arrows F.C.
