= Chunati =

Coordinates: 21.9691°N 92.0734°E

Chunati is a small village located near the Asian Highway (old Arakan Road) in southeastern Bangladesh between Chittagong and Cox's Bazar in Lohagara Upazila, Bangladesh. The distance from Chittagong is about 70 km. The population was 20,364 in 2011. Chunati Wildlife Sanctuary is an IUCN Category IV protected area located around Chunati.
