= Dola, Shahdol =

Dola
- Census town
- Location in Madhya Pradesh, India Dola (India)
- Coordinates: 23°13′6″N 82°7′42″E
- Country: India
- State: Madhya Pradesh
- District: Shahdol

Population (2001)
  - Total: 10,377

Languages
  - Official: Hindi
- Time zone: UTC+5:30 (IST)
- PIN: 484446
- ISO 3166 code: IN-MP
- Vehicle registration: MP

Dola is a census town in Shahdol district in the state of Madhya Pradesh, India.

== Demographics ==
As of 2001 India census, Dola had a population of 5,860. Males constitute 55% of the population and females 48%. Dola has an average literacy rate of 85%, higher than the national average of 59.5%: male literacy is 70% and, female literacy is 53%. In Dola, 14% of the population is under 6 years of age. In Dola, there is a village called New Dola.
