= Doli, Jodhpur =

Village in Rajasthan, India

Coordinates: 26°10′24″N 72°53′15″E

- Village
- Location in Rajasthan, India Doli, Jodhpur (India)
- Country: India
- State: Rajasthan
- District: Balotra district

Government
  - Type: Democratic
  - Body: Tehsil

Population (2011)
  - Total: 5,163

Languages
  - Official: Hindi/Marwadi
- Time zone: UTC+5:30 (IST)
- Nearest city: Jodhpur, Balotra

Doli is a large village located in Luni Tehsil of Jodhpur district, Rajasthan, with a total of 851 families residing. The Doli village has population of 5163 of which 2616 are males while 2547 are females as per Population Census 2011.
