= Shkëlzen Doli =

Albanian violinist

Shkëlzen Doli (born August the 9th, 1971 in Elbasan, Albania, and grew up in Gjakova, Kosovo) is an Albanian violinist. He began to play the violin in 1980. From 1987 to 1991, he studied at the music school in Novi Sad under Ewgenia Tschugueva. In 1989, he won his first prize at the Yugoslavian youth music contest in Sarajevo.

Doli began music studies at University of Music and Performing Arts in Vienna in 1992. While there, he studied under Dora Schwarzberg, Michael Frischenschlager, and Josef Hell. After starting studies in Vienna, he became a substitute for the Vienna State Opera Orchestra, and ultimately, a member of the second violin section. Since 1995, he has played with the Vienna Philharmonic Orchestra.

Solo has embedded himself in Vienna’s musical life by taking part in various Philharmonic chamber music ensembles, such as the “Toyota Master Players”, the “Vienna Virtuosen,” and René Staar’s “Ensemble Wiener Collage.” Professionally, he has toured as a soloist and as an ensemble member in numerous European countries as well as in North America, Africa, Israel and, Japan.

Recently, he became a founding member of the chamber music ensemble, “The Philharmonics”.
