= Dola Hill Stadium =

Multi-use stadium in Ndola, Zambia

Coordinates: 12.9623°S 28.5926°E

Dola Hill Stadium is a multi-use stadium in Ndola, Zambia. It is currently used mostly for football matches and serves as the home for Forest Rangers F.C.. The stadium holds 2,300 people. It is located in a township called Dola Hill.
