= Chunati Union =

Chunati Union চুনতি
- Union Council
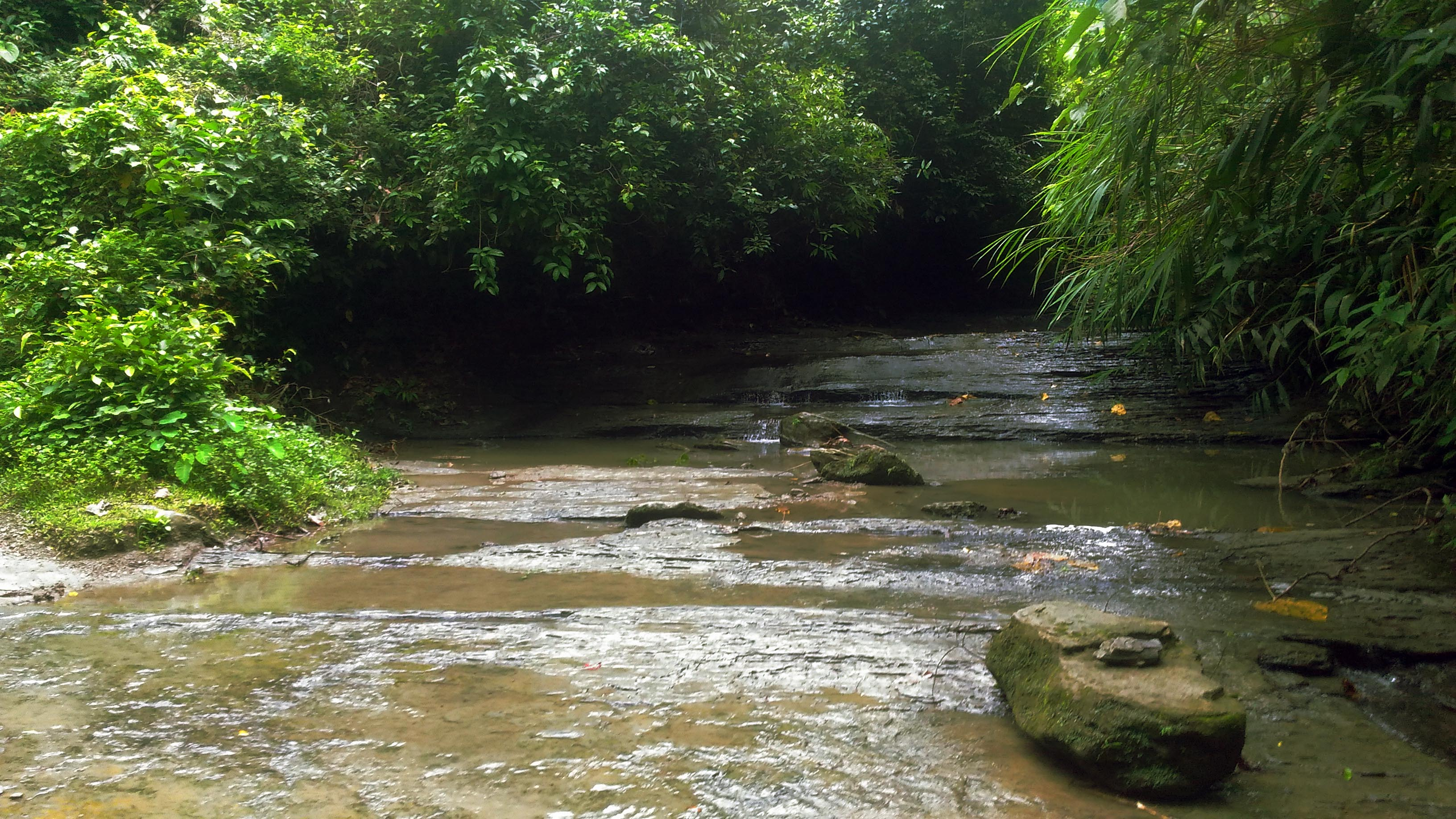
- Chunati Wildlife Sanctuary, Bangladesh

- Location in Bangladesh
- Coordinates: 21°54′0″N 92°08′0″E
- Country: Bangladesh
- Division: Chittagong Division
- District: Chittagong District Lohagara Upazila

Government
  - Chairman: Mohammad Joynul Abedin

Area
  - Total: 61.22 km^{2} (23.64 sq mi)

Population (1991)
  - Total: 33,415
  - Density: 545.8/km^{2} (1,414/sq mi)
- Time zone: UTC+6 (BST)
- Postal code: 4398
- Website: chunatiup.chittagong.gov.bd

Chunati Union (Bengali: চুনতি ইউনিয়ন) is a union parishad of Lohagara Upazila, Chittagong District, Bangladesh.

== Local government ==
Chairman

- Mohammad Zoynul Abedin

== Area ==
The union total area is 61.22km

== Points of interest ==
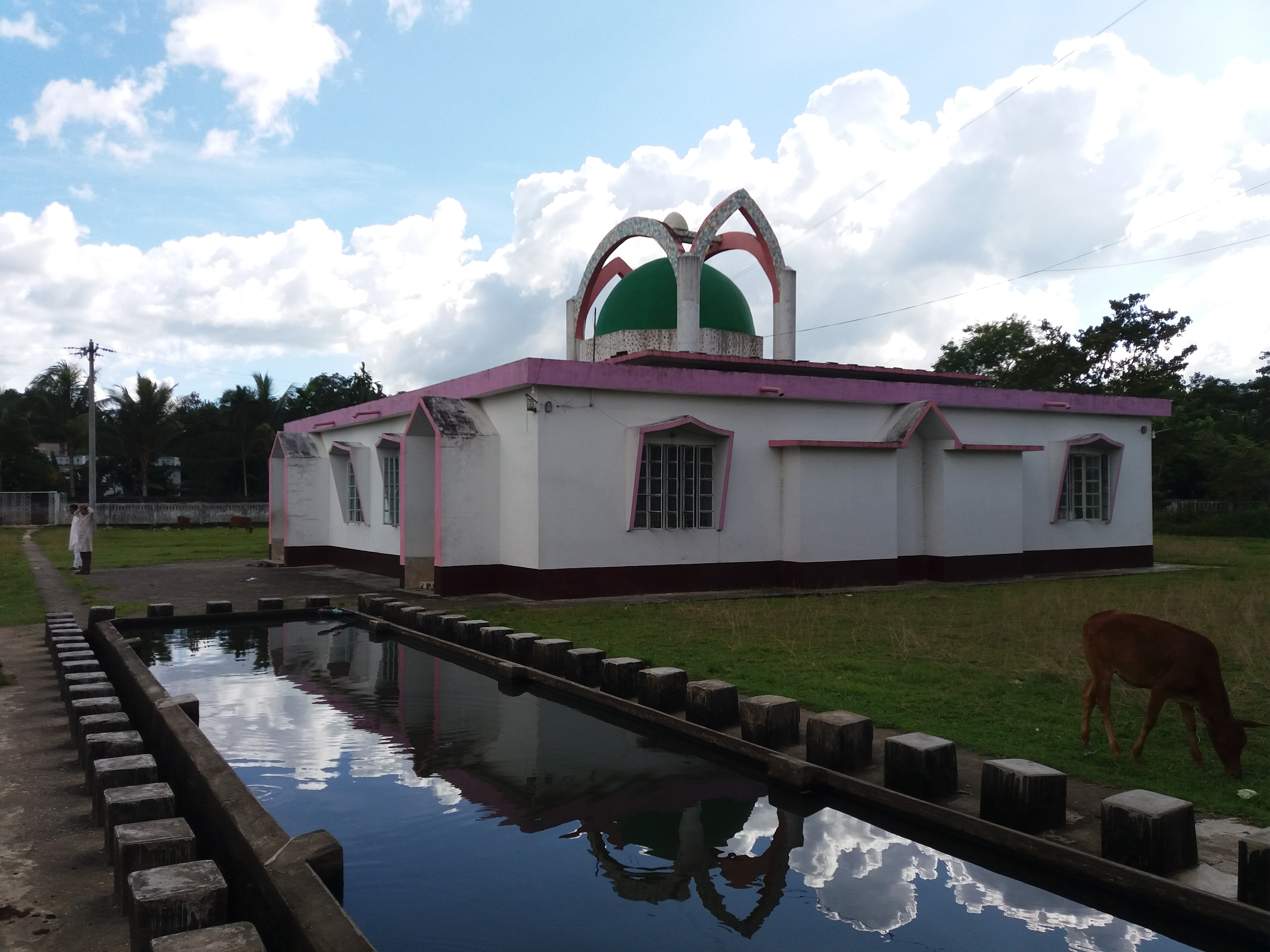
Dargah of Hafez Ahamd Shah Saheb Chunati

- Chunati Wildlife Sanctuary
