= 2024 ABSA Cup =

2024 Absa Cup
Tournament details
- Country: Zambia
- Dates: 23 March – 12 May
- Teams: 24

Final positions
- Champions: Red Arrows (3rd title)
- Runners-up: Kabwe Warriors

Tournament statistics
- Matches played: 19
- Goals scored: 56 (2.95 per match)
- Top goal scorer: Ricky Banda (5 goals) (Red Arrows)

The 2024 Absa Cup was the 17th edition of the ABSA Cup, the annual knock-out competition in Zambian football contested by 10 provincial representatives the top 7 teams from the Super League and the top 4 teams from the National Division One following the conclusion of match day 17 of the 2022–23 season. It was also the 5th edition under the "Absa Cup" name following Absa's completed acquisition of the African assets and operations of Barclays in 2018.

== Matches ==
=== Preliminary stage ===
The first round saw the provincial matches a total of 5 matches.

- Mwaimwena Strikers 2-2 Ndola United (Mwaimwena Strikers won 9–8 on penalties)
  - Scorers: James Pule (14), Paul Chishimba (64); Chipasha Bwalya (5), Shadreck Phiri (81)
- Malalo Police 1-0 Muchinga Blue Eagles
  - Scorer: Obed Simutenda (67)
- Mines United 2-3 River Plate
  - Scorers: Nisa Mphande (65, 90); Boyd Kauya (16), Charles Chabala (75, 85)
- Chirundu United 3-0 Katete Rangers
  - Scorers: George Mwape (32), Lufalo Banda, Laston Mayongwe
- Barotse Crocs 1-0 Young Kansanshi Dynamos
  - Scorer: Gilpin Shemi (82, own goal)

=== Second Round ===
- Nkwazi 0-0 Indeni (Indeni won 4–3 on penalties)
- Power Dynamos 5-0 Mwaimwena Strikers
  - Scorers: John Soko (2), Joshua Mutale (26, 55pen), Francis Zulu (34), Austin Muwowo (40)
- Red Arrows 7-1 Malalo Police
  - Scorers: Ricky Banda (24, 49), George Chaloba (43, 55), James Chamanga (62), Brian Chilimina (82, 90); Pempelo Mwanza (87)
- Nchanga Rangers 0-0 River Plate (Nchanga Rangers won 6–5 on penalties)
- MUZA 3-0 Chirundu United
  - Scorers: Kelvin Mwanza (21), Biston Banda (42), Andrew Phiri (70)
- Green Eagles 2-1 Atletico Lusaka
  - Scorers: Tapson Kaseba (24), Aaron Musore (69pen); Samson Malaya (85)
- Kabwe Warriors 1-0 Lumwana Radiants
  - Scorer: Frederick Mwimanzi (57)
- Zesco United 4-0 Barotse Crocs
  - Scorers: John Chingandu (29), David Simukonda (60), Chanda Mukuka (83), Pascal Phiri (90)

==== Quarterfinals ====
- Indeni 0-5 Kabwe Warriors
  - Scorers: Mathews Topola (35, 49), Mundia Phiri (69), Akakulubelwa Mwachiaba (82), Kenny Phiri (90, own goal)
- Power Dynamos 0-1 MUZA
  - Scorer: Andrew Phiri (85)
- Zesco United 0-0 Nchanga Rangers (Nchanga Rangers won 3–4 on penalties)
- Red Arrows 2-1 Green Eagles
  - Scorers: Ciel Ebengo (6), Saddam Yusuf Phiri (16); Derrick Bulaya (52)

==== Semifinals ====
- Kabwe Warriors 2-1 MUZA
  - Scorers: Godfrey Binga (3), Ocean Mushure (88pen); Kelvin Mwanza (75)
- Nchanga Rangers 1-2 Red Arrows
  - Scorers: Angle Lubamba (39); Ricky Banda (42), Allasane Diarra (84)

=== Details ===
12 May 2024
15:00 CAT (UTC+02:00)

Kabwe Warriors	1–2	Red Arrows
52' Godfrey Binga	Report	1' Ricky Banda; 42' Allasane Diarra

Heroes Stadium, Lusaka
Attendance: 35,000
