= Independence Stadium (Zambia) =

Stadium

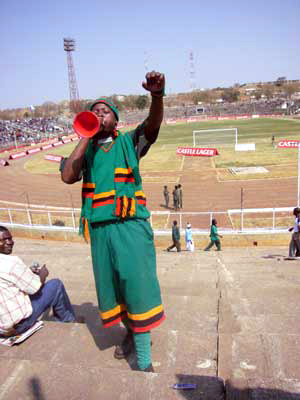
- A Zambian fan at the stadium
- Interactive map of Independence Stadium
- Former names: 7 April Stadium
- Location: Lusaka, Zambia
- Coordinates: 15°22′16″S 28°16′11″E
- Owner: Nationally owned
- Operator: Government
- Capacity: 30,000

Construction
- Built: 1964
- Opened: 1964

Tenant
- Zambia national football team

Independence Stadium is a multi-purpose stadium in Lusaka, Zambia. It was originally built in the mid-1960s for use in hosting the country's independence celebrations. It is currently used mostly for football matches. The stadium holds 30,000 people. It is located adjacent to the National Heroes Stadium.

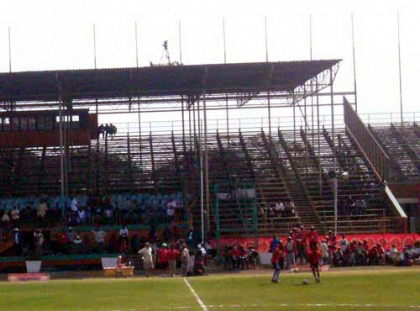
Independence Stadium

In 2004, the stadium was closed by the then national sports minister citing safety concerns due to the age and status of the building. The order was repealed in 2005, though safety concerns remained. As of 2007, the aging stadium is slated to undergo renovations to bring its structure and facilities up to internationally accepted standards as well as deal with its various safety issues. The stadium's west grandstand was demolished in late 2007.

A new 70,000-seat stadium, currently referred to as New Lusaka Stadium, would have been built next to the Independence Stadium for Lusaka's hosting of the 2011 All-Africa Games before Lusaka withdrew its hosting duties in December 2008 due to lack of funds. The hosting rights were given to Maputo.
