= Dolu River =

Dolu River ডলু নদী

Location
- Country: Bangladesh
- Districts: Bandarban; Chittagong

Physical characteristics
- Source
  - location: Tonkabati
  - coordinates: 21.9091°N 92.1720°E
- Mouth
  - location: Sangu River
  - coordinates: 22.1474°N 92.0187°E
- Length: 53 km (33 mi)
- Discharge
  - average: Annual average

Basin features
- River system: Hillside River System

The Dolu (Bengali: ডলু) is a local river in part of Sangu River Bangladesh. Dolu River or Tangkabati River is a river in the eastern hills of Bandarban and Chittagong Districts. The length of the river is 53 kilometers, the average width is 16 meters, and the nature of the river is spiral. The Bangladesh Water Development Board gave the name Dalu.
