= Chunati Wildlife Sanctuary =

Wildlife sanctuary in Bangladesh

- IUCN category IV (habitat/species management area)
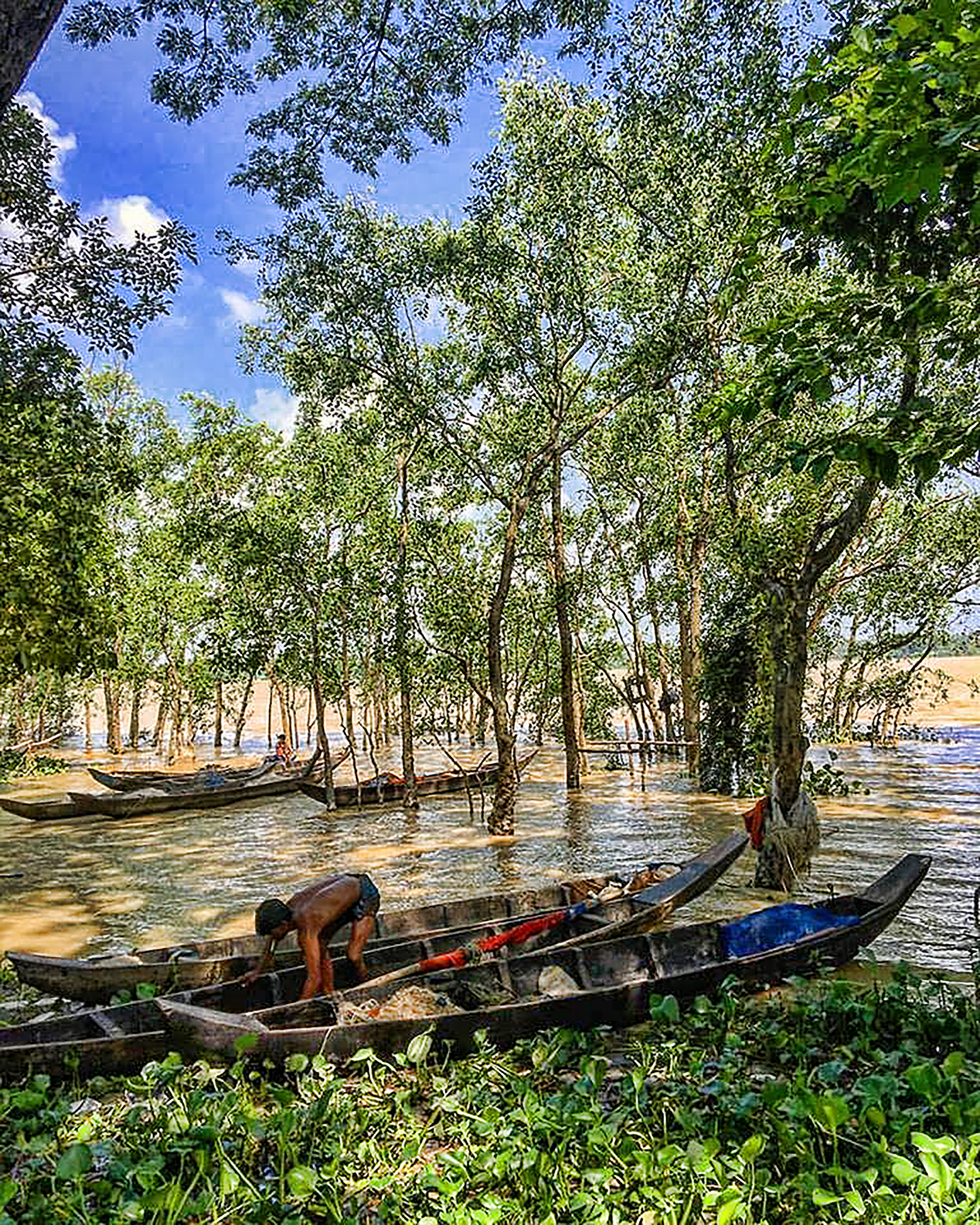

- Location within Bangladesh
- Location: Bangladesh
- Nearest city: Chittagong
- Coordinates: 21°54′0″N 92°08′0″E
- Area: 7,763.94 ha (19,185.1 acres)
- Established: 1986
- Governing body: Bangladesh Forest Department

Chunati Wildlife Sanctuary is an IUCN Category IV protected area located close to the village of Chunati in the Chittagong District of the Chittagong Division in southeastern Bangladesh.

== History ==
The Sanctuary was established in 1986 through Gazette Notification XII/For-I/84/174. Covering nearly 7764 hectares, the predominant vegetation was originally garjan forest, but illegal logging and encroachment for cultivation resulted in a fragmented and degraded habitat. By 2003, secondary scrub covered approximately 44% of the Sanctuary, but various replanting projects have been undertaken with donor support. This was the first wildlife sanctuary in Bangladesh. There are 15 villages in and around the Sanctuary. The Sanctuary is home to several endangered timber species.

== Wildlife ==
Chunati Wildlife Sanctuary is a major corridor for the movement of Asian elephant between Bangladesh and Myanmar. There are 20 key elephant crossing points in and around the sanctuary. It is a major habitat for Asian elephants and home to at least 372 species of birds, mammals and amphibians. Mammal species in the Sanctuary include muntjac deer, fishing cat, wild boar and Malayan porcupine. Birds include the black-rumped flameback, coppersmith barbet, chestnut-headed bee-eater, Asian green bee-eater, greater coucal, house swift, spotted dove, black drongo, jungle myna and Asian pied starling

== Administration and protection ==
The park is under the jurisdiction of Bangladesh Forest Department of the Ministry of Environment and Forest (MoEF)(Now known as Ministry of Environment, Forest and Climate Change or MoEF&CC), and is managed by them in cooperation with local communities. The community patrols are led by women in green saris. They are from the local community and are funded by U.S. Agency for International Development and Germany's development agency GTZ. They receive stipends of $50 for their service.
