= Dolu, Azerbaijan =

Dolu
- Municipality
- Location within Azerbaijan
- Coordinates: 38°32′N 48°37′E
- Country: Azerbaijan
- Rayon: Astara

Population
  - Total: 343
- Time zone: UTC+4 (AZT)

Dolu (or Doli) is a village and municipality in the Astara Rayon of Azerbaijan. It has a population of 343. The municipality consists of the villages of Dolu and Sipiyyəd.
