= Maestro United Zambia F.C. =

Maestro United Zambia
- Full name: Maestro United Zambia Football Club
- Nickname: The Elegant Dynamites
- Founded: 2007; 19 years ago
- Ground: Nakambala Stadium
- Capacity: 5,000
- Chairman: Keith Bebeto Mweemba
- Manager: Nowell Phiri
- League: Zambia Super League
- 2025–26: 3rd of 18

Maestro United Zambia Football Club or simply MUZA FC is a professional football club based in Mazabuka, Zambia. The club was founded in 2007 as Manchester United Zambian Academy Football Club and was later renamed Maestro United Zambia Academy Football Club in 2019. The club was established by Lusaka lawmaker Keith Bebeto Mweemba.

== 2007–present ==
Maestro United, made its debut in the country's top-tier football league during the 58th season in 2019. However, their initial stint in the league was short-lived, as they were subsequently relegated to division one within the same season.

The club earned promotion a second time and was able to compete in the 62nd season of the Zambian Super League in the 2022–23 season. They achieved the 2nd place during their second season in the top flight. The club participated in the ABSA Cup in the same season and reached for the first time the grand final. They lost the final against Forest Rangers 0–2, after beating Red Arrows in the quarter-finals 2-0 and Trident F.C. in the semi-finals 1–0.

=== CAF Confederation Cup ===
MUZA made its inaugural appearance in continental competition by securing a spot in the 2023–24 CAF Confederation Cup qualifying rounds after clinching second place in Zambia's Super league. In their opening round of fixtures, they faced off against Equatorial Guinea's Cano Sport, emerging victorious with a 4–1 aggregate score.
