= Amirabad Union, Lohagara =

Union in Chittagong Division

Coordinates: 22°54′18″N 91°27′32″E

Amirabad is a union in Chittagong Division, Bangladesh. It is located at 22°54'18N 91°27'32E at an altitude of 0 metres.

== Demography ==
As of 2011, the population of Amirabad Union was 37,303.
