= Zambian Charity Shield =

Samuel ‘Zoom’ Ndhlovu Charity Shield
- Organiser(s): FAZ
- Founded: 1967; 59 years ago
- Region: Zambia
- Teams: 2
- Current champions: Red Arrows (4th title)
- Most championships: Nkana (18 titles)
- 2024 Zambian Charity Shield

The Zambian Charity Shield officially called Samuel ‘Zoom’ Ndhlovu Charity Shield since 2003 is a season opener match between the champions of the previous Super League season and the holders of the ABSA Cup. If the Super League champions also won the ABSA Cup then the league runners-up provide the opposition. The fixture was first played in the 1967 season. The current holders are Red Arrows, who defeated Kabwe Warriors 2-1 in the 2024 match.

== Records ==
- The most successful teams in the competition are Nkana (18 outright wins), Kabwe Warriors (7 outright wins), Power Dynamos (5 outright wins)
- The highest scoring game was Nkana 4-0 win against INDENI in 2000.

== Winners ==
=== By number of wins (clubs) ===
Team	Wins	Years
Nkana	18	1982, 1983, 1984, 1985, 1987, 1989, 1990, 1991, 1993, 1994, 1995, 1996, 1997, 2000, 2014, 2018, 2019, 2020
Kabwe Warriors	7	1969, 1970, 1971, 1972, 1973, 1988, 1992
Power Dynamos	6	1998, 2004, 2009, 2012, 2013, 2016
Green Buffaloes	5	1974, 1978, 1980, 2008, 2010
Zesco United	5	2007, 2011, 2015, 2017, 2021
Mufulira Wanderers	4	1967,1968, 1976, 1977
Zanaco	4	2001, 2003, 2006, 2019
Red Arrows	4	1975, 2005, 2022, 2024
Nchanga Rangers	3	1979, 1999, 2002
Ndola United	1	1981
Vitafoam United	1	1986
