= City of Lusaka F.C. =

Zambian football club

City of Lusaka F.C..
- Full name: City of Lusaka Football Club
- Nickname: City Yamoto
- Founded: 1937
- Ground: Woodlands Stadium, Lusaka, Zambia
- Capacity: 10,000
- Chairman: Chomba Mumba
- Manager: Hassam Adams
- League: Zambian National Division One League
Home colours

City of Lusaka F.C. is a football club based in Lusaka, Zambia founded in 1937. They are a member of the Football Association of Zambia. They play their home games at Woodlands Stadium.

The club plays in black and white colours.

== History ==
City of Lusaka played in the Zambian Premier League in 2002–03, 2007-10, and 2017. The team is currently playing in the second tier of Zambian league, or the FAZ National Division One.

== Honours ==
- Old First Division Champions (1964,1970)
- Zambian Premier League Champions (2016)
- FAZ Provincial Cup Champions (2020)

== Notable former coaches ==
- (Zambia) Chris Tembo (2015)
- (Zambia) Davy Musole (2015)
- (Zambia) Elijah Chikwanda (2017)
- (Zambia) Hector Chilombo (2017)
- (Italy) Roberto Randi (2017)
- (Zambia) George Kapembwa (2018)
- (Serbia) Vaselin Velusic (2020)
- (Spain) Jordi Rovira (2021)
- (Zambia) Isaac Chansa (2021)
- (Zambia) Albert Mphande (2022)
- (Poland) Slawomir Cisakowski (2022–2023)

== Club officials/Technical team ==
- Chairman: (Zambia) Chomba Mumba
- Vice Chairman: (Zambia) Justin Zulu
- Technical director/Head coach : (Poland) Sławomir Cisakowski
- Goalkeeping coach: (Zambia) Donald Phiri
- Youth Head coach: (Zambia) Bruce Lumino
- Physiotherapist: (Zambia) Matthews Kabundi
- Team manager: (Zambia) Hassan Adams
- Media Manager: (Zambia) Innocent Mwansa
- Kit manager: (Zambia) Oswald Sichinga
- Match Organizer: (Zambia) George B Njovu
