= ABSA Cup =

Zambian knockout football competition

- Logo since 2019
- Organiser(s): FAZ
- Founded: 2007
- Region: Zambia
- Teams: 8 teams (6 from Super League and 2 from National Division One)
- Current champions: Red Arrows F.C.
- Most championships: ZESCO United F.C (6 titles)
- Broadcaster: SuperSport
- 2026 ABSA Cup

The ABSA Cup, formerly the Barclays Cup, is the current branding for an association football cup competition launched in 2007 by the Football Association of Zambia.

Participants are decided half-way through current season (match day 17) and are picked from the two highest divisions in Zambia. Since the inaugural season of National Division One in the 2019–20 season, 2 teams are picked from that division and 6 are from the Super League to enter the competition each year.

Following the full acquisition of the assets and operations of Barclays in Africa, including Zambia, by South Africa-based ABSA (now Absa Group Limited) in 2018, the competition's next edition in 2019 was rebranded as the Absa Cup.

The video assistant referee (VAR) was introduced to the competition and implemented on a pilot basis at the final of the 2023 edition, a first in Zambian football and Sub-Saharan African football as a whole. Thus, this put Zambia on the list as the 3rd African country after Morocco and Egypt to introduce and implement VAR in domestic football matches. Head of referees at FAZ, Aziph Banda, cited the inadequacy of FIFA-certified referees to operate the VAR, with female referee Diana Chikotesha being the only exception having previously experienced its usage at the 2022 Women's Africa Cup of Nations and Janny Sikazwe having retired as the reason why the association appointed foreign referees solely for that final.

== New format ==
As of the 2024–25 season, 21 teams from Zambia's three highest leagues (10 provincial league, 4 National division one, 7 super league) will qualify at the halfway point of the season.

== Winners ==
As Barclays Cup
2007	ZESCO United	0–0 (aet, 4–2 pen.)	Chambishi
2008	ZESCO United	1–0	Power Dynamos
2009	Power Dynamos	2–1	Green Buffaloes
2010	ZESCO United	2–0	Zanaco
2011	Power Dynamos	2–1	Konkola Blades
2012	NAPSA Stars	4–4 (a.e.t., 4–2 pen.)	Power Dynamos
2013	Red Arrows	3–1	Nchanga Rangers
2014	ZESCO United	3–0	Nkana
2015	Green Buffaloes	2–0	Nkwazi
2016	ZESCO United	1–0	Zanaco
2017	Zanaco	2–1 (a.e.t.)	NAPSA Stars
2018	Nkana	3–0	Young Buffaloes
As Absa Cup
2019	ZESCO United	4–1	Zanaco
2020	Cancelled due to the COVID-19 pandemic in Zambia		
2021	Lusaka Dynamos	0–0 (3–1 pen.)	ZESCO United
2022	Napsa Stars	1–0	Red Arrows
2023	Forest Rangers	2–0	Maestro United Zambia
2024	Red Arrows	2–1	Kabwe Warriors
2025	ZESCO United	1–1 (4–2 pen.)	Red Arrows
2026	Red Arrows	2–0	Power Dynamos

== Performances by club ==
Club	Location	Winners	Losing finalists
ZESCO United	Ndola	7	1
Red Arrows	Lusaka	3	2
Power Dynamos	Kitwe	2	3
NAPSA Stars	Lusaka	2	1
Zanaco	Lusaka	1	3
Green Buffaloes	Lusaka	1	1
Nkana	Kitwe	1	1
Lusaka Dynamos	Lusaka	1	0
Forest Rangers	Ndola	1	0
Chambishi	Chambishi	0	1
Kabwe Warriors	Kabwe	0	1
Konkola Blades	Chililabombwe	0	1
Maestro United Zambia F.C.	Mazabuka	0	1
Nchanga Rangers	Chingola	0	1
Nkwazi	Lusaka	0	1
Young Buffaloes		0	1

== Records ==
- Shadreck Malambo set a competition record by winning all 3 ABSA Cup finals he has featured in, each with 3 different clubs; 2013 with Red Arrows, 2018 with Nkana and 2023 with Forest Rangers.
