= Woodlands Stadium (Lusaka) =

Multi-use stadium in Lusaka, Zambia

Coordinates: 15.4459°S 28.3475°E

- Interactive map of Woodlands Stadium
- Location: Lusaka, Zambia
- Capacity: 10,000
- Surface: Grass

Tenant
- City of Lusaka

Woodlands Stadium is a multi-use stadium in Lusaka, Zambia. It is currently used mostly for football matches and serves as the home for City of Lusaka F.C. of the Zambian National Division One. The stadium holds about 10,000.
