= Levy Mwanawasa Stadium =

Stadium in Ndola, Zambia

- Levy
- Interactive map of Levy Mwanawasa Stadium
- Full name: Levy Mwanawasa Stadium
- Location: T3 Highway, Ndola, Zambia
- Coordinates: 12°58′30″S 28°36′41″E
- Owner: Government of Zambia
- Operator: Various Zambian clubs
- Capacity: 49,800
- Surface: Grass
- Record attendance: 49,800 (Zambia vs. Ivory Coast, 15 November 2024)
- Field size: 104 yd × 68 yd (95 m × 62 m)

Construction
- Built: 2010
- Opened: 2 June 2012
- Architect: Shanghai Construction Group

Tenants
- ZESCO United F.C. (2012–present); Zambia national football team (selected matches)

The Levy Mwanawasa Stadium is a multi-purpose stadium in Ndola, Zambia. It is used mostly for football matches and is the home for ZESCO United. Other Ndola-based clubs like Forest Rangers F.C. and Buildcon F.C. occasionally use the stadium as well. The stadium has a capacity of 49,800 people. It is located on the T3 road at the start of the Ndola-Kitwe Dual Carriageway.

In 2010, the Chinese government announced that the stadium will be built. The first international game that was played in the stadium was held on 9 June 2012. It was a world cup qualifier between the host nation Zambia and Ghana which had a result of 1–0 in favour of Zambia.

The stadium is named after Levy Mwanawasa, the third President of Zambia, who served from 2002 to his death in 2008.

== See also ==
- List of football stadiums in Zambia
- Lists of stadiums
