= Football in Zambia =

- Country: Zambia
- Governing body: Football Association of Zambia
- National teams: Men's national team Women's national team
- Nicknames: Chipolopolo; Copper Queens
- First played: at least 1929 (men); at least 1983 (women)

National competitions
- FIFA World Cup (m); FIFA Women's World Cup (w); Olympic Games; Africa Cup of Nations (m); Women's Africa Cup of Nations (w); COSAFA Cup (m); COSAFA Women's Championship (w)

Club competitions
- Zambian Premier League (m); Women Super Division (w); ABSA Cup (m)

International competitions
- CAF Champions League (m); CAF Women's Champions League (w); CAF Confederation Cup (m); CAF Super Cup (m)

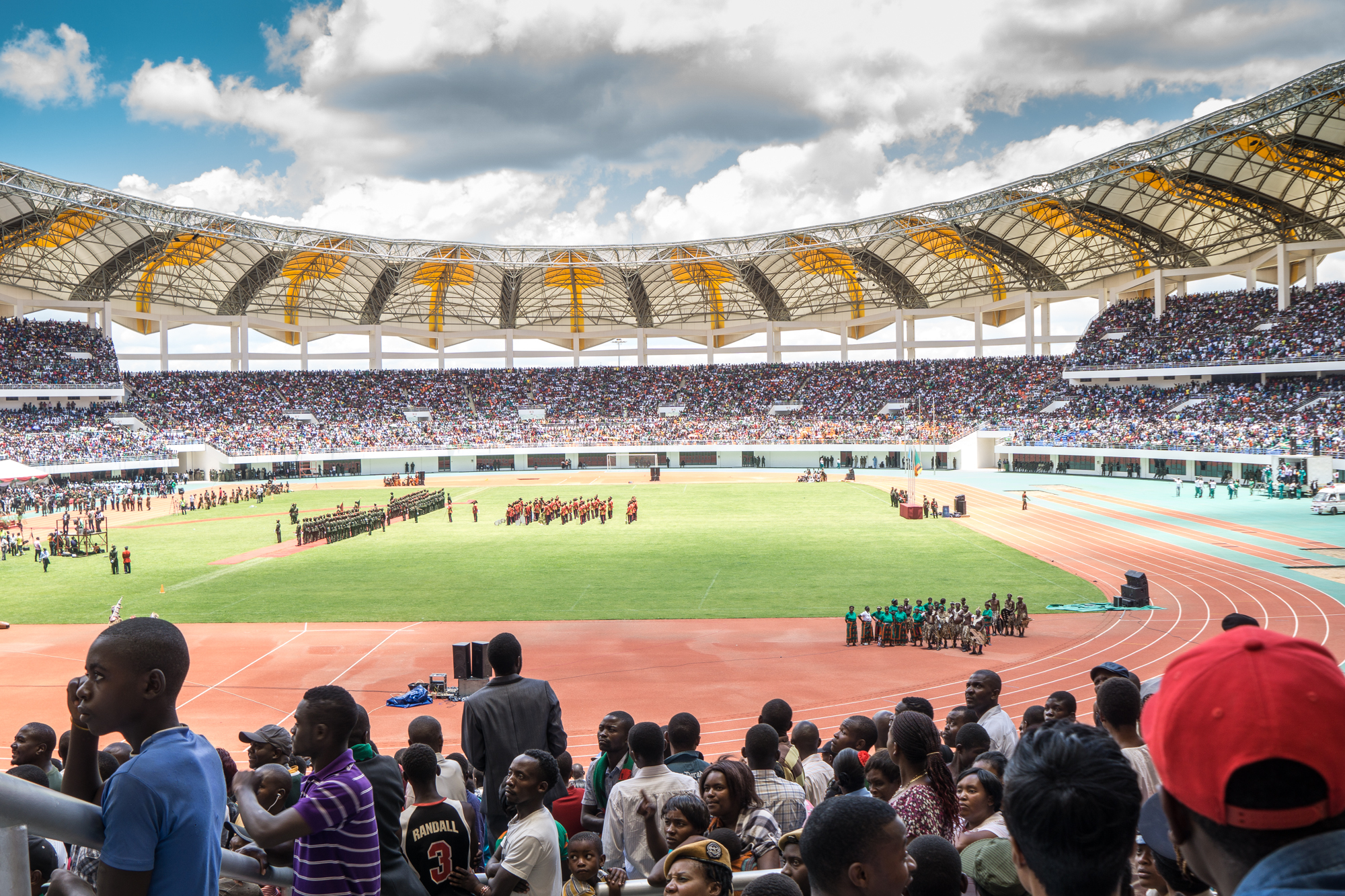
The National Heroes Stadium is the largest sports venue by capacity in Zambia.

Association football is the most popular sport in Zambia. The sport of football in the country of Zambia is run by the Football Association of Zambia. The association administers the men's and women's national teams, as well as the Premier League, and the Women Super Division.

== History ==
Football was introduced to what is now Zambia during the colonial period. The Football Association of Zambia was founded in 1929, when the territory was still known as Northern Rhodesia, and a men's representative team was established around the same time. After independence in 1964, President Kenneth Kaunda supported the development of football and investment in sporting infrastructure.

Organised women's football developed several decades later, particularly in the Copperbelt. A Zambian women's representative team was organised in 1983 and played an exhibition match in Ndola before a men's international between Zambia and Uganda. The match attracted considerable interest, and a national women's league was established in 1984, with teams from towns including Kitwe, Mufulira, Ndola, Luanshya and Chingola. Among the leading clubs of the period were the Kitwe Flying Angels, who dominated the women's game during the second half of the 1980s. The decline of financial support from the mining industry contributed to the weakening of these structures around the beginning of the 1990s, while new women's football programmes subsequently developed in Lusaka.

The men's national team became one of Zambia's most prominent sporting institutions, but suffered a major tragedy in 1993 when an aircraft carrying the team to a World Cup qualifying match crashed off the coast of Gabon. Eighteen players and five team officials were among those killed in the 1993 Zambia national football team air disaster. A rebuilt national team reached the final of the 1994 African Cup of Nations the following year and Zambia later won the tournament for the first time in 2012.

Women's football was reorganised nationally during the late 1990s and subsequently became increasingly integrated into the structures of the Football Association of Zambia. Zambia's women's national team made its first appearance at the African Women's Championship in 2014 and later qualified for the 2020 Olympic Games, becoming the first Zambian women's team to compete at the Olympics. Zambia finished third at the 2022 Women's Africa Cup of Nations and qualified for its first FIFA Women's World Cup in 2023. The expansion of the domestic women's game also led to the establishment of a national top-flight competition, now known as the FAZ Women's Super Division.

== Men's national team ==
The men's national team won the Africa Cup of Nations for the first time in 2012, defeating Ivory Coast in the final.

Godfrey Chitalu is often considered to be the greatest Zambian player ever. He was Zambian Football of the Year five times, won the

Its former captain Godfrey Chitalu has been described as "the greatest Zambian player ever". The Football Association of Zambia claims that he holds the world record for the most official goals in a year.

== Women's national team ==
The women's national team qualified for their first world cup at the 2023 FIFA Women's World Cup, by reaching the semi-finals of 2022 Women's Africa Cup of Nations. It won the COSAFA Women's Championship in 2022.

The top-striker of the most successful period of the team, Barbra Banda, was named Africans Women's Footballer of the Year and BBC Women's Footballer of the Year in 2024.

== Support ==
Twitter research from 2015 found that the most popular English Premier League club in Zambia was Manchester United, with 30% of Zambian Premier League fans following the club, followed by Arsenal (27%) and Chelsea (18%).

== Attendances ==
The average attendance in the men's top-flight football league by season and the club with the highest average attendance:

| Season | League average | Best club | Best club average |
|---|---|---|---|
| 2023-24 | 1,236 | Mufulira Wanderers | 5,118 |

Source: League page on Wikipedia

== See also ==
- List of football stadiums in Zambia
