= Forest Rangers F.C. =

Zambian football club

Forest Rangers Football Club
- Full name: Forest Rangers Football Club
- Nickname: Fole Malembe
- Founded: 1975; 51 years ago
- Ground: Dola Hill Stadium, Ndola, Northern Zambia
- Capacity: 2,300
- Manager: Boyd Mulwanda
- League: Zambian National League
- 2025–26: 5th
Home colours

Forest Rangers F.C. is a football club from Ndola, Zambia, currently playing in the second division of the Zambia Premier League Zambia National League.

== History ==
In 1975, Forest Rangers Football Club started as Community Football Team at Dola Hill Forest Station in Ndola and joined the Ndola District Amateur League in 1976. After a period of 3 years, the club was promoted to Division 3 under the Copperbelt Amateur League up to the end of the 1988 soccer season. The club played Division 1 football from 1989 to 1991.

During the 1991 soccer season, the club finished as runners up in the Independence Cup Competition after losing 5–1 to Nkana Football Club. This was after the club had eliminated Mufulira Wanderers in the semi-final by a lone goal at Nkana Stadium. At the end of the same soccer season, the club won promotion to the Super League Division.

The club stayed in the Super League Division up to the end of the 1994 soccer season. During the 1994 season, the club finished among the top eight clubs of the Super League Division.

In 1995, the sponsors (ZAFFICO Limited) under the cost saving measures policy disbanded the team.

In 1998, the team was revamped through social football. In 1999, the team merged with Strike Rovers Football club and played Division 1 Football under the club name of Forest Strikes Football Club up to 2000.

In 2001, the club retained the name of Forest Rangers Football Club when ZAFFICO Limited became the sole sponsors of the club.

The club's Premier League Football performance since 2002 has been as follows:

| Year | Competition | Notes |
|---|---|---|
| 2002 | Super League | |
| 2003 | Division 1 | |
| 2004 | Super League | |
| 2005 | Division 1 | |
| 2006 | Super League | Top 8 |
| 2007 | Super League | |
| 2008 | Division 1 | |
| 2009 | Super League | Top 8 |
| 2010 | Super League | |
| 2011 | Super League | |
| 2012 | Super League | |
| 2013 | Super League | |
| 2014 | Division 1 | |
| 2015 | Super League | |

- In 2020, Forest Rangers finished the FAZ Super League in second position, losing the title to Nkana Football Club on goal difference. As a result, they qualified for the CAF Champions League 2020/2021 season. This was the first time the club had finished as runners up since its inception in 1975 and the first time it had qualified for the CAF Champions League.

== Colors ==
Traditionally, the club has always worn yellow and green home kits, with green and white as their away and third colors respectively.

== Achievements ==
- Zambian Coca-Cola Cup: 1 (2005)
- FAZ MTN Super League - runners-up in 2020
- CAF Champions league - 2020/2021 qualifiers
- ABSA Cup: 1 (2023)

== Squad ==
As of 13 June 2021

Note: Flags indicate national team as defined under FIFA eligibility rules; some limited exceptions apply. Players may hold more than one non-FIFA nationality.

| No. | Pos. | Nation | Player |
|---|---|---|---|
| 2 | DF | ZAM | Ian Sindaye |
| 3 | DF | ZAM | Enock Bwanga |
| 4 | FW | NGR | Quadri Aladeokun |
| 5 | MF | COD | Dieugo Apanane |
| 13 | MF | ZAM | Clement Mulenga |
| 14 | GK | ZAM | Daniel Mutahinuemu |
| 16 | GK | CMR | Leopold Kamguia |
| 18 | FW | GHA | Amenu Moro |
| 23 | DF | ZAM | Jackson Chirwa |

| No. | Pos. | Nation | Player |
|---|---|---|---|
| 25 | DF | CMR | Cédric Djeugoué |
| 30 | FW | ZAM | Eric Chomba |
| 33 | DF | ZAM | Geral Simusokwe |
| 39 | DF | NIG | Wasiu Oluwasegun Jimoh |
| 70 | FD | ZAM | Emmanuel Mwiinde |
