= Power Dynamos F.C. =

Association football club in Zambia

Power Dynamos
- Full name: Power Dynamos Football Club
- Nicknames: Power 90; Aba Yellow
- Founded: 1971; 55 years ago
- Ground: Arthur Davies Stadium, Kitwe
- Capacity: 12,000
- League: MTN/FAZ Super Division
- 2025–26: 1st
- Website: www.powerdynamos.co.zm
| Home colours | Away colours |

Power Dynamos Football Club is a Zambian professional football club based in Kitwe that plays in the MTN/FAZ Super Division. They play their home games at Arthur Davies Stadium in Kitwe.

The club is currently sponsored by Copperbelt Energy Corporation.

Power Dynamos' main rivals are Nkana FC and Zesco United FC. Games involving Power Dynamos and any of these two clubs are always well-attended by the soccer fans.

In 1991, Power Dynamos became the first southern African club, and so far, the only Zambian club, to win a continental trophy after they won the African Cup Winners' Cup.

== Honours ==
=== National ===
- Zambian Premier League: 9

1984, 1991, 1994, 1997, 2000, 2011, 2022–23, 2024–25, 2025–26

- Zambian Cup: 7

1979, 1980, 1982, 1990, 1997, 2001, 2003
Finalist : 2002

- Zambian Charity Shield: 6

1998, 2004, 2009, 2012, 2013, 2016

- Zambian Challenge Cup: 2

1990, 2001

- ABSA Cup: 2

2009, 2011
Finalist : 2008, 2012

- Zambian Coca-Cola Cup: 1

2003

- Zambian Barclays Cup: 2

2009, 2011

=== International ===
- African Cup Winners' Cup: 1

1991
Finalists:1982

- Rothmans International Cup:1 *Champions 1983
- CAF Champions League *Quarter finalists 1985 *Second Round 1998, 2001 & 2012 *First Round 1995

== Performance in CAF competitions ==
- CAF Champions League: 4 appearances

1998 – Second Round
2001 – First Round
2012 – Second Round
2023/24 - Second Round

- African Cup of Champions Clubs: 2 appearances

1985 – Second Round
1995 – First Round

- CAF Cup Winners' Cup: 10 appearances

1981 – Quarter-finals
1982 – Finalist
1986 – Quarter-finals
1988 – Second Round

1989 – Second Round
1991 – Champion
1992 – Second Round
1994 – First Round

1999 – Quarter-finals
2003 – Quarter-finals

== Coaches ==
- (Zambia) Fred Mwila Sr (Coach)
- (Zambia) Ben Bamfuchile (Coach) (late)
- (Zambia) Aggrey Chiyangi (Coach)
- (Zambia) Jones Mwewa (Assistant) (late)
- (Zambia) Fordson Kabole (Coach)
- (Zambia) Alex Chola (Coach) (late) (1985–90), (1992–93)
- (Scotland) Jimmy Bone (Coach) (1988–91)
- (Zambia) Gaston Mutobo (Coach) (1999–2000)
- (Egypt) Mohamed Fathy (Coach) (2009)
- (Zambia) Tenant Chilumba (Coach) (2014–16)
- (Zambia) Dan Kabwe (Coach) (2016–18)
- (Zambia) Kelvin Kaindu (Coach) (2018–19)
- (Zambia) Fordson Kabole (Coach) (2019)
- (Zambia) Gaston Mutobo (Coach) (2019)
- (Zambia) Perry Mutapa (Coach) (2020–2021
- (Zambia) Masautso Tembo
- (Zambia) Mwenya Chipepo (2022-2024)
- (Zambia) Osward Mutapa

== See also ==
- Kitwe Derby
