= 2008 Africa Cup of Nations squads =

This article lists the official squads for the 2008 Africa Cup of Nations, held in Ghana in January and February 2008.

== Group A ==
=== Ghana ===
Head coach: Claude Le Roy

No.	Pos.	Player	Date of birth (age)	Caps	Club
1	GK	Sammy Adjei	1 September 1980 (aged 27)	34 (0)	(Israel) Ashdod
2	DF	Hans Sarpei	28 June 1976 (aged 31)	17 (0)	(Germany) Bayer Leverkusen
3	FW	Asamoah Gyan	22 November 1985 (aged 22)	23 (12)	(Italy) Udinese
4	DF	John Paintsil	15 June 1981 (aged 26)	33 (0)	(England) West Ham United
5	DF	John Mensah	29 November 1982 (aged 25)	44 (0)	(France) Rennes
6	MF	Anthony Annan	21 July 1986 (aged 21)	6 (0)	(Norway) Start
7	MF	Laryea Kingston	7 November 1980 (aged 27)	19 (4)	(Scotland) Heart of Midlothian
8	MF	Michael Essien	3 December 1982 (aged 25)	31 (5)	(England) Chelsea
9	FW	Junior Agogo	1 August 1979 (aged 28)	9 (4)	(England) Nottingham Forest
10	FW	Kwadwo Asamoah	12 September 1988 (aged 19)	0 (0)	(Ghana) Liberty Professionals
11	MF	Sulley Muntari	27 August 1984 (aged 23)	31 (8)	(England) Portsmouth
12	FW	André Ayew	17 December 1989 (aged 18)	5 (0)	(France) Marseille
13	FW	Baffour Gyan	2 July 1980 (aged 27)	28 (5)	(Russia) Saturn Ramenskoye
14	MF	Bennard Yao Kumordzi	21 March 1985 (aged 22)	3 (1)	(Greece) Panionios
15	MF	Ahmed Barusso	26 December 1984 (aged 23)	4 (1)	(Italy) Roma
16	GK	Abdul Fatawu Dauda	6 April 1985 (aged 22)	0 (0)	(Ghana) Ashanti Gold
17	DF	Nana Akwasi Asare	11 July 1986 (aged 21)	2 (0)	(Belgium) KV Mechelen
18	DF	Eric Addo	12 November 1978 (aged 29)	17 (0)	(Netherlands) PSV
19	DF	Illiasu Shilla	26 October 1982 (aged 25)	13 (0)	(Russia) Saturn Ramenskoye
20	FW	Quincy Owusu-Abeyie	15 April 1986 (aged 21)	0 (0)	(Spain) Celta Vigo
21	DF	Harrison Afful	24 June 1986 (aged 21)	0 (0)	(Ghana) Asante Kotoko
22	GK	Richard Kingson (c)	13 June 1978 (aged 29)	47 (0)	(England) Birmingham City
23	FW	Haminu Dramani	1 April 1986 (aged 21)	17 (2)	(Russia) Lokomotiv Moscow

=== Guinea ===
Head coach: Robert Nouzaret

No.	Pos.	Player	Date of birth (age)	Caps	Club
1	GK	Naby Diarso	31 December 1976 (aged 31)		(Guinea) Satellite
2	MF	Pascal Feindouno (c)	27 February 1981 (aged 26)		(France) Saint-Étienne
3	DF	Ibrahima Camara	1 January 1985 (aged 23)		(France) Le Mans
4	MF	Mohamed Cisse	10 February 1982 (aged 25)		(Turkey) Bursaspor
5	DF	Bobo Baldé	5 October 1975 (aged 32)		(Scotland) Celtic
6	DF	Kamil Zayatte	7 March 1985 (aged 22)		(Switzerland) Young Boys
7	FW	Fodé Mansaré	3 September 1981 (aged 26)		(France) Toulouse
8	MF	Kanfory Sylla	7 July 1980 (aged 27)		(Turkey) Sivasspor
9	FW	Victor Correia	12 January 1985 (aged 23)		(France) Cherbourg
10	FW	Ismaël Bangoura	2 January 1985 (aged 23)		(Ukraine) Dynamo Kyiv
11	FW	Souleymane Youla	29 November 1981 (aged 26)		(France) Lille
12	DF	Alsény Camara	4 November 1986 (aged 21)		(France) Rodez
13	MF	Mohamed Sakho	5 August 1988 (aged 19)		(Tunisia) Étoile du Sahel
14	MF	Naby Soumah	22 April 1988 (aged 19)		(Tunisia) Sfaxien
15	DF	Oumar Kalabane	8 April 1981 (aged 26)		(Turkey) Manisaspor
16	GK	Kémoko Camara	5 April 1975 (aged 32)		Unattached
17	DF	Mamadou Alimou Diallo	2 December 1984 (aged 23)		(Turkey) Sivasspor
18	MF	Samuel Johnson	25 January 1984 (aged 23)		(Egypt) Ismaily
19	FW	Karamoko Cisse	14 November 1988 (aged 19)		(Italy) Hellas Verona
20	DF	Habib Jean Balde	8 February 1985 (aged 22)		(France) Reims
21	DF	Daouda Jabi	10 April 1981 (aged 26)		(Turkey) Trabzonspor
22	GK	Naby Yattara	12 January 1984 (aged 24)		(Belgium) Couillet
23	DF	Mamadou Bah	25 April 1988 (aged 19)		(France) Strasbourg

=== Morocco ===
Head coach: Henri Michel

No.	Pos.	Player	Date of birth (age)	Caps	Club
1	GK	Nadir Lamyaghri	13 February 1976 (aged 31)		(Morocco) Wydad Casablanca
2	DF	Michaël Chrétien Basser	10 July 1984 (aged 23)		(France) Nancy
3	DF	Hicham Mahdoufi	5 August 1984 (aged 23)		(Ukraine) Metalist Kharkiv
4	DF	Abdeslam Ouaddou	1 November 1978 (aged 29)		(France) Valenciennes
5	DF	Talal El Karkouri	8 July 1976 (aged 31)		Qatar SC
6	DF	Amin Erbati	3 September 1981 (aged 26)		(United Arab Emirates) Dhafra
7	FW	Soufiane Alloudi	1 July 1983 (aged 24)		(United Arab Emirates) Al-Ain
8	MF	Abdelkarim Kissi	5 May 1980 (aged 27)		(Cyprus) Enosis Neon Paralimni
9	FW	Bouchaib El Moubarki	12 January 1978 (aged 30)		(France) Grenoble
10	FW	Tarik Sektioui	13 May 1977 (aged 30)		(Portugal) Porto
11	FW	Moncef Zerka	31 August 1981 (aged 26)		(France) Nancy
12	GK	Khalid Fouhami	15 December 1972 (aged 35)		(Morocco) Raja Casablanca
13	MF	Houssine Kharja	9 November 1982 (aged 25)		(Italy) Piacenza
14	DF	Abdessamad Chahiri	17 May 1982 (aged 25)		(Morocco) Difaa El Jadida
15	MF	Youssef Safri (c)	3 January 1977 (aged 31)		(England) Southampton
16	FW	Youssef Mokhtari	5 March 1979 (aged 28)		(Qatar) Al-Rayyan
17	FW	Marouane Chamakh	10 January 1984 (aged 24)		(France) Girondins de Bordeaux
18	MF	Abderrahman Kabous	24 April 1983 (aged 24)		(Bulgaria) CSKA Sofia
19	DF	Jamal Alioui	6 February 1982 (aged 25)		(Switzerland) Sion
20	FW	Youssouf Hadji	3 June 1980 (aged 27)		(France) Nancy
21	DF	Badr El Kaddouri	31 January 1981 (aged 26)		(Ukraine) Dynamo Kyiv
22	GK	Abdelillah Bagui	17 February 1978 (aged 29)		(Morocco) Maghreb Fez
23	FW	Hicham Aboucherouane	2 April 1981 (aged 26)		(Tunisia) Espérance de Tunis

=== Namibia ===
Head coach: Arie Schans

No.	Pos.	Player	Date of birth (age)	Caps	Club
1	GK	Athiel Mbaha	5 December 1976 (aged 31)		(Namibia) Orlando Pirates
2	DF	Jeremiah Baisako	13 July 1980 (aged 27)		(South Africa) Free State Stars
3	DF	Hartman Toromba	2 November 1984 (aged 23)		(South Africa) Black Leopards
4	DF	Maleagi Ngarizemo	20 June 1979 (aged 28)		(South Africa) FC Cape Town
5	DF	Richard Gariseb	3 February 1980 (aged 27)		(South Africa) Wits University
6	DF	Franklin April	18 April 1984 (aged 23)		(Namibia) Civics
7	MF	Collin Benjamin	3 August 1978 (aged 29)		(Germany) Hamburger SV
8	MF	Oliver Risser	17 September 1980 (aged 27)		(Germany) Hannover 96 II
9	FW	Levis Swartbooi	18 March 1984 (aged 23)		(Angola) Primeiro de Agosto
10	MF	Abraham Shatimuene	2 April 1986 (aged 21)		(Angola) Primeiro de Agosto
11	MF	Sydney Plaatjies	25 November 1981 (aged 26)		(South Africa) Jomo Cosmos
12	FW	Muna Katupose	22 February 1988 (aged 19)		(Namibia) Oshakati City
13	DF	Michael Pienaar (c)	10 October 1982 (aged 25)		(South Africa) Free State Stars
14	MF	Brian Brendell	7 September 1986 (aged 21)		(Namibia) Civics
15	FW	Rudolph Bester	19 July 1983 (aged 24)		(Namibia) Eleven Arrows
16	GK	Abisai Shiningayamwe	3 August 1978 (aged 29)		(South Africa) Jomo Cosmos
17	MF	Quinton Jacobs	21 January 1979 (aged 28)		(Norway) Bryne
18	DF	Gottlieb Nakuta	8 May 1988 (aged 19)		(Namibia) Blue Waters
19	FW	Lazarus Kaimbi	12 August 1988 (aged 19)		(South Africa) Jomo Cosmos
20	FW	Pineas Jacob	29 October 1985 (aged 22)		(South Africa) Free State Stars
21	MF	Wycliff Kambonde	10 January 1988 (aged 20)		(South Africa) Jomo Cosmos
22	MF	Jamuovandu Ngatjizeko	28 December 1984 (aged 23)		(Namibia) Civics
23	GK	Ephraim Tjihonge	23 May 1986 (aged 21)		(South Africa) Black Leopards

== Group B ==
=== Benin ===
Head coach: Reinhard Fabisch

No.	Pos.	Player	Date of birth (age)	Caps	Club
1	GK	Rachad Chitou	18 September 1976 (aged 31)		(Nigeria) Wikki Tourists
2	MF	Djiman Koukou	14 November 1980 (aged 27)		(Benin) Soleil FC
3	DF	Khaled Adénon	28 July 1985 (aged 22)		(France) Le Mans
4	DF	Bio Ai Traore	9 June 1985 (aged 22)		(Benin) Panthères FC
5	DF	Damien Chrysostome	24 May 1982 (aged 25)		(Italy) Casale
6	MF	Jonas Okétola	27 August 1983 (aged 24)		(South Africa) Thanda Royal Zulu
7	MF	Romauld Boco	8 July 1985 (aged 22)		(England) Accrington Stanley
8	FW	Razak Omotoyossi	8 October 1985 (aged 22)		(Sweden) Helsingborg
9	FW	Abou Maiga	20 September 1985 (aged 22)		(France) Créteil
10	FW	Oumar Tchomogo	7 January 1978 (aged 30)		(Portugal) Portimonense
11	MF	Oscar Olou	16 November 1987 (aged 20)		(France) Rouen
12	DF	Achille Rouga	10 June 1987 (aged 20)		(France) Rennes
13	DF	Noël Séka	3 September 1984 (aged 23)		(Denmark) FC Fyn
14	DF	Alain Gaspoz	16 May 1970 (aged 37)		(Switzerland) FC Bagnes
15	DF	Anicet Adjamonsi	15 March 1984 (aged 23)		(France) Créteil
16	GK	Yoann Djidonou	17 May 1986 (aged 21)		(France) Red Star Saint-Ouen
17	MF	Stéphane Sessègnon	1 June 1984 (aged 23)		(France) Le Mans
18	DF	Séïdath Tchomogo	13 August 1985 (aged 22)		(Bahrain) East Riffa Club
19	MF	Jocelyn Ahouéya	19 December 1985 (aged 22)		(Switzerland) Sion
20	FW	Wassiou Oladipikpo	17 December 1983 (aged 24)		(Algeria) JS Kabylie
21	MF	Sosthène Soglo	3 July 1986 (aged 21)		(Benin) Energie FC
22	GK	Valere Amoussou	13 March 1987 (aged 20)		(Benin) Mogas 90 FC
23	FW	Abdoulaye Ouzerou	24 October 1985 (aged 22)		(Benin) Buffles FC

=== Ivory Coast ===
Head coach: Gérard Gili

No.	Pos.	Player	Date of birth (age)	Caps	Club
1	GK	Boubacar Barry	30 December 1979 (aged 28)		(Belgium) Lokeren
2	DF	Constant Djakpa	17 October 1986 (aged 21)		(Romania) Pandurii Târgu Jiu
3	DF	Arthur Boka	2 April 1983 (aged 24)		(Germany) VfB Stuttgart
4	DF	Kolo Touré	19 March 1981 (aged 26)		(England) Arsenal
5	MF	Didier Zokora	14 December 1980 (aged 27)		(England) Tottenham Hotspur
6	DF	Steve Gohouri	8 February 1981 (aged 26)		(Germany) Borussia Mönchengladbach
7	MF	Emerse Faé	24 January 1984 (aged 23)		(England) Reading
8	FW	Salomon Kalou	15 August 1985 (aged 22)		(England) Chelsea
9	FW	Arouna Koné	11 November 1983 (aged 24)		(Spain) Sevilla
10	FW	Gervinho	27 May 1987 (aged 20)		(France) Le Mans
11	FW	Didier Drogba (c)	11 March 1978 (aged 29)		(England) Chelsea
12	DF	Abdoulaye Méïté	6 October 1980 (aged 27)		(England) Bolton Wanderers
13	MF	Romaric	4 June 1983 (aged 24)		(France) Le Mans
14	FW	Bakari Koné	17 September 1981 (aged 26)		(France) Nice
15	FW	Aruna Dindane	26 November 1980 (aged 27)		(France) Lens
16	GK	Stephan Loboué	23 August 1981 (aged 26)		(Germany) Greuther Fürth
17	DF	Siaka Tiéné	22 February 1982 (aged 25)		(France) Saint-Étienne
18	FW	Kader Keïta	6 August 1981 (aged 26)		(France) Lyon
19	MF	Yaya Touré	13 May 1983 (aged 24)		(Spain) Barcelona
20	FW	Boubacar Sanogo	12 December 1982 (aged 25)		(Germany) Werder Bremen
21	DF	Emmanuel Eboué	4 June 1983 (aged 24)		(England) Arsenal
22	DF	Marco Zoro	27 December 1983 (aged 24)		(Portugal) Benfica
23	GK	Tiassé Koné	17 October 1987 (aged 20)		(Ivory Coast) Africa Sports

=== Mali ===
Head coach: Jean-François Jodar

No.	Pos.	Player	Date of birth (age)	Caps	Club
1	GK	Mahamadou Sidibé	8 October 1978 (aged 29)		(Greece) PAS Giannina
2	DF	Boubacar Koné	21 August 1984 (aged 23)		(Morocco) Maghreb Fez
3	DF	Adama Tamboura	18 May 1985 (aged 22)		(Sweden) Helsingborgs IF
4	DF	Adama Coulibaly	10 September 1980 (aged 27)		(France) Lens
5	DF	Souleymane Diamoutene	30 January 1983 (aged 24)		(Italy) Lecce
6	MF	Mahamadou Diarra (c)	18 May 1981 (aged 26)		(Spain) Real Madrid
7	FW	Mamady Sidibé	18 December 1979 (aged 28)		(England) Stoke City
8	MF	Bassala Touré	21 February 1976 (aged 31)		(Greece) Levadikos
9	MF	Amadou Sidibé	19 February 1986 (aged 21)		(Mali) Djoliba AC
10	FW	Dramane Traoré	17 June 1982 (aged 25)		(Russia) Lokomotiv Moscow
11	MF	Djibril Sidibé	23 March 1982 (aged 25)		(France) Châteauroux
12	MF	Seydou Keita	16 January 1980 (aged 28)		(Spain) Sevilla
13	FW	Mamadou Diallo	17 April 1982 (aged 25)		Qatar SC
14	MF	Drissa Diakité	18 February 1985 (aged 22)		(France) Nice
15	DF	Cédric Kanté	6 July 1979 (aged 28)		(France) Nice
16	GK	Soumaila Diakite	25 August 1984 (aged 23)		(Mali) Stade Malien
17	DF	Sammy Traoré	25 February 1976 (aged 31)		(France) Auxerre
18	MF	Souleymane Dembélé	3 September 1984 (aged 23)		(Mali) Djoliba AC
19	FW	Frédéric Kanouté	2 September 1977 (aged 30)		(Spain) Sevilla
20	MF	Mohamed Sissoko	27 January 1985 (aged 22)		(England) Liverpool
21	FW	Mahamadou Dissa	18 May 1979 (aged 28)		(Belgium) Roeselare
22	GK	Oumar Sissoko	13 September 1987 (aged 20)		(France) Metz
23	DF	Moussa Coulibaly	19 May 1981 (aged 26)		(Algeria) MC Algiers

=== Nigeria ===
Head coach: Berti Vogts

No.	Pos.	Player	Date of birth (age)	Caps	Club
1	GK	Vincent Enyeama	29 August 1982 (aged 25)		(Israel) Hapoel Tel Aviv
2	DF	Joseph Yobo	6 September 1980 (aged 27)		(England) Everton
3	DF	Taye Taiwo	16 April 1985 (aged 22)		(France) Marseille
4	FW	Nwankwo Kanu (c)	1 August 1976 (aged 31)		(England) Portsmouth
5	DF	Obinna Nwaneri	19 March 1982 (aged 25)		(Switzerland) Sion
6	DF	Danny Shittu	2 September 1980 (aged 27)		(England) Watford
7	FW	John Utaka	8 January 1982 (aged 26)		(England) Portsmouth
8	FW	Yakubu	22 November 1982 (aged 25)		(England) Everton
9	FW	Obafemi Martins	28 October 1984 (aged 23)		(England) Newcastle United
10	MF	Mikel John Obi	22 April 1987 (aged 20)		(England) Chelsea
11	FW	Peter Odemwingie	15 July 1981 (aged 26)		(Russia) Lokomotiv Moscow
12	GK	Austin Ejide	8 April 1984 (aged 23)		(France) Bastia
13	DF	Rabiu Afolabi	18 April 1980 (aged 27)		(France) Sochaux
14	MF	Seyi Olofinjana	12 June 1980 (aged 27)		(England) Wolverhampton Wanderers
15	FW	Ikechukwu Uche	5 January 1984 (aged 24)		(Spain) Getafe
16	MF	Dickson Etuhu	8 June 1982 (aged 25)		(England) Sunderland
17	FW	Stephen Makinwa	26 July 1983 (aged 24)		(Italy) Lazio
18	FW	Victor Obinna	25 March 1987 (aged 20)		(Italy) Chievo
19	DF	Ifeanyi Emeghara	24 March 1984 (aged 23)		(Romania) Steaua București
20	MF	Onyekachi Okonkwo	13 May 1982 (aged 25)		(Switzerland) Zürich
21	MF	Richard Eromoigbe	26 June 1984 (aged 23)		(Bulgaria) Levski Sofia
22	DF	Onyekachi Apam	30 December 1985 (aged 22)		(France) Nice
23	GK	Dele Aiyenugba	20 November 1983 (aged 24)		(Israel) Bnei Yehuda

== Group C ==
=== Cameroon ===
Head coach: Otto Pfister

No.	Pos.	Player	Date of birth (age)	Caps	Club
1	GK	Carlos Kameni	18 February 1984 (aged 23)		(Spain) Espanyol
2	DF	Gilles Binya	29 August 1984 (aged 23)		(Portugal) Benfica
3	DF	Bill Tchato	14 May 1975 (aged 32)		Qatar SC
4	DF	Rigobert Song (c)	1 July 1976 (aged 31)		(Turkey) Galatasaray
5	DF	Timothée Atouba	17 February 1982 (aged 25)		(Germany) Hamburger SV
6	DF	Benoît Angbwa	1 January 1982 (aged 26)		(Russia) Krylya Sovetov
7	MF	Modeste M'bami	9 October 1982 (aged 25)		(France) Marseille
8	MF	Geremi	20 December 1978 (aged 29)		(England) Newcastle United
9	FW	Samuel Eto'o	10 March 1981 (aged 26)		(Spain) Barcelona
10	MF	Achille Emaná	5 June 1982 (aged 25)		(France) Toulouse
11	MF	Jean Makoun	29 May 1983 (aged 24)		(France) Lille
12	MF	Alain N'Kong	6 April 1979 (aged 28)		(Mexico) Atlante
13	MF	Landry N'Guémo	28 November 1985 (aged 22)		(France) Nancy
14	MF	Joël Epalle	20 February 1978 (aged 29)		(Germany) VfL Bochum
15	MF	Alex Song	9 September 1987 (aged 20)		(England) Arsenal
16	GK	Souleymanou Hamidou	22 November 1973 (aged 34)		(Turkey) Denizlispor
17	FW	Mohamadou Idrissou	8 March 1980 (aged 27)		(Germany) MSV Duisburg
18	FW	Bertin Tomou	8 August 1978 (aged 29)		(Belgium) Mouscron
19	MF	Stéphane Mbia	20 May 1986 (aged 21)		(France) Rennes
20	DF	Paul Essola	13 December 1981 (aged 26)		(Ukraine) Arsenal Kyiv
21	FW	Joseph-Désiré Job	1 December 1977 (aged 30)		(France) Nice
22	GK	Janvier Charles Mbarga	27 September 1985 (aged 22)		(Cameroon) Canon Yaoundé
23	DF	André Bikey	8 January 1985 (aged 23)		(England) Reading

=== Egypt ===
Head coach: Hassan Shehata

No.	Pos.	Player	Date of birth (age)	Caps	Club
1	GK	Essam El-Hadary	15 January 1973 (aged 35)		(Egypt) Al Ahly
2	DF	Mahmoud Fathallah	13 February 1982 (aged 25)		(Egypt) Al-Zamalek
3	DF	Ahmed Elmohamady	9 September 1987 (aged 20)		(Egypt) ENPPI
4	DF	Ibrahim Said	16 October 1979 (aged 28)		(Turkey) Ankaragücü
5	DF	Shady Mohamed	29 November 1977 (aged 30)		(Egypt) Al Ahly
6	DF	Hany Said	22 April 1980 (aged 27)		(Egypt) Ismaily
7	DF	Ahmed Fathy	10 November 1984 (aged 23)		(Egypt) Al Ahly
8	MF	Hosny Abd Rabo	1 November 1984 (aged 23)		(Egypt) Ismaily
9	FW	Mohamed Zidan	11 December 1981 (aged 26)		(Germany) Hamburger SV
10	FW	Emad Moteab	20 February 1983 (aged 24)		(Egypt) Al Ahly
11	MF	Mohamed Shawky	5 October 1981 (aged 26)		(England) Middlesbrough
12	MF	Omar Gamal	16 September 1982 (aged 25)		(Egypt) Ismaily
13	DF	Tarek El-Sayed	9 October 1978 (aged 29)		(Egypt) Al-Zamalek
14	DF	Sayed Moawad	25 February 1979 (aged 28)		(Egypt) Ismaily
15	MF	Ahmed Shaaban	10 October 1978 (aged 29)		(Egypt) Petrojet
16	GK	Mohamed Abdel Monsef	6 February 1977 (aged 30)		(Egypt) Al-Zamalek
17	MF	Ahmed Hassan(c)	2 May 1975 (aged 32)		(Belgium) Anderlecht
18	FW	Mohamed Fadl	21 July 1981 (aged 26)		(Egypt) Ismaily
19	FW	Amr Zaki	1 April 1983 (aged 24)		(Egypt) Al-Zamalek
20	DF	Wael Gomaa	3 August 1975 (aged 32)		(Qatar) Al-Siliya
21	MF	Hassan Mostafa	20 November 1979 (aged 28)		(Saudi Arabia) Al-Wehda
22	MF	Mohamed Aboutrika	7 November 1978 (aged 29)		(Egypt) Al Ahly
23	GK	Mohamed Sobhy	30 August 1981 (aged 26)		(Egypt) Ismaily

=== Sudan ===
Head coach: (Sudan) Mohamed Abdallah

No.	Pos.	Player	Date of birth (age)	Caps	Club
1	GK	Akram El Hadi Salim	27 February 1987 (aged 20)		(Sudan) Al-Merrikh SC
2	DF	Omer Mohamed Bakhit	24 November 1984 (aged 23)		(Sudan) Al-Hilal Club
3	DF	Mousa El Tayeb	15 June 1984 (aged 23)		(Sudan) Al-Merrikh SC
4	DF	Mohammed Ali El Khider	1 January 1985 (aged 23)		(Sudan) Al-Merrikh SC
5	MF	Ala'a Eldin Yousif	3 January 1982 (aged 26)		(Sudan) Al-Hilal Club
6	DF	Richard Justin Lado	5 October 1979 (aged 28)		(Sudan) Al-Hilal Club
7	MF	Alaaeldin Jebril Katoul	7 December 1978 (aged 29)		(Sudan) Al-Hilal Club
8	MF	Haitham Mustafa	19 July 1977 (aged 30)		(Sudan) Al-Hilal Club
9	MF	Hamouda Bashir	3 January 1984 (aged 24)		(Sudan) Al-Hilal Club
10	FW	Haytham Tambal	28 November 1978 (aged 29)		(Sudan) Al-Merrikh SC
11	FW	Alaaeldin Babeker	16 December 1984 (aged 23)		(Sudan) Al-Merrikh SC
12	MF	Bader Eldin Abdalla Galag	1 April 1981 (aged 26)		(Sudan) Al-Merrikh SC
13	MF	Muhannad El Tahir	3 December 1982 (aged 25)		(Sudan) Al-Hilal Club
14	MF	Mujahed Ahmed	14 August 1981 (aged 26)		(Sudan) Al-Merrikh SC
15	DF	Amir Damar Koku	8 December 1979 (aged 28)		(Sudan) Al-Merrikh SC
16	GK	El Muez Mahgoub	14 August 1978 (aged 29)		(Sudan) Al-Hilal Club
17	FW	Faisal Agab	24 August 1978 (aged 29)		(Sudan) Al-Merrikh SC
18	DF	Khaled Jolit	3 January 1981 (aged 27)		(Sudan) Al-Hilal Club
19	DF	Ahmed El-Basha	2 January 1982 (aged 26)		(Sudan) Al-Merrikh SC
20	FW	Abdelhamid Amari	20 August 1984 (aged 23)		(Sudan) Al-Merrikh SC
21	GK	Bahaeddine Rihan	1 January 1979 (aged 29)		(Sudan) Al Neel SC (Al-Hasahisa)
22	MF	Saif Eldin Ali Idris Farah	27 October 1984 (aged 23)		(Sudan) Al-Hilal Club
23	MF	Hassan Karongo	28 February 1985 (aged 22)		(Sudan) Al-Hilal Club

=== Zambia ===
Head coach: Patrick Phiri

No.	Pos.	Player	Date of birth (age)	Caps	Club
1	GK	Mike Poto	15 January 1981 (aged 27)		(Zambia) Green Buffaloes
2	FW	Jacob Mulenga	12 February 1984 (aged 23)		(France) Strasbourg
3	DF	Kennedy Nketani	25 November 1984 (aged 23)		(Zambia) Zanaco
4	DF	Joseph Musonda	30 May 1977 (aged 30)		(South Africa) Golden Arrows
5	DF	Hichani Himoonde	15 June 1985 (aged 22)		(Zambia) Lusaka Dynamos
6	MF	Francis Kasonde	28 December 1979 (aged 28)		(Zambia) Power Dynamos
7	MF	Clifford Mulenga	5 August 1987 (aged 20)		(Israel) Maccabi Petach Tikva
8	MF	Isaac Chansa	23 March 1984 (aged 23)		(Sweden) Helsingborgs IF
9	FW	Felix Sunzu	2 May 1989 (aged 18)		(Zambia) Konkola Blades
10	MF	Ian Bakala	1 November 1980 (aged 27)		(Angola) Primeiro de Agosto
11	FW	Chris Katongo	31 August 1982 (aged 25)		(Denmark) Brøndby
12	FW	Dube Phiri	16 January 1983 (aged 25)		(Angola) Primeiro de Agosto
13	DF	Willy Chinyama	19 April 1984 (aged 23)		(Zambia) ZESCO United
14	FW	Emmanuel Mayuka	21 November 1990 (aged 17)		(Zambia) Kabwe Warriors
15	DF	Kampamba Chintu	28 December 1980 (aged 27)		(South Africa) Free State Stars
16	GK	Kennedy Mweene	11 December 1984 (aged 23)		(South Africa) Free State Stars
17	MF	Rainford Kalaba	14 August 1986 (aged 21)		(Zambia) ZESCO United
18	DF	Billy Mwanza	21 January 1983 (aged 24)		(South Africa) Golden Arrows
19	DF	Clive Hachilensa	17 September 1979 (aged 28)		(Zambia) ZESCO United
20	MF	Felix Katongo	18 April 1984 (aged 23)		(Angola) Petro Atlético
21	FW	James Chamanga	2 February 1980 (aged 27)		(South Africa) Moroka Swallows
22	GK	Kalililo Kakonje	1 June 1985 (aged 22)		(South Africa) AmaZulu
23	MF	William Njovu	27 April 1987 (aged 20)		(Zambia) Lusaka Dynamos

== Group D ==
=== Angola ===
Head coach: Oliveira Gonçalves

No.	Pos.	Player	Date of birth (age)	Caps	Club
1	GK	Lamá	1 February 1981 (aged 26)	9	(Angola) Petro Atlético
2	DF	Marco Airosa	6 August 1984 (aged 23)	2	(Portugal) Fátima
3	DF	Jamba	10 July 1977 (aged 30)	38	(Angola) ASA
4	DF	Manuel Machado	24 December 1985 (aged 22)		(Portugal) Anadia
5	DF	Kali	11 October 1978 (aged 29)	25	(Switzerland) Sion
6	DF	Yamba Asha	31 July 1978 (aged 29)	49	(Angola) Petro Atlético
7	MF	Paulo Figueiredo (c)	28 November 1972 (aged 35)	28	(Sweden) Öster
8	MF	André Macanga	4 May 1978 (aged 29)	35	Al-Kuwait
9	FW	Mateus	19 June 1984 (aged 23)	7	(Portugal) Boavista
10	MF	Maurito	24 June 1981 (aged 26)	16	Al-Kuwait
11	MF	Gilberto	21 July 1982 (aged 25)		(Egypt) Al Ahly
12	GK	Nuno	5 April 1983 (aged 24)		(Angola) ASA
13	MF	Edson	2 March 1980 (aged 27)	8	(Portugal) Paços de Ferreira
14	MF	António Mendonça	9 October 1982 (aged 25)	37	(Portugal) Belenenses
15	DF	Rui Marques	3 September 1977 (aged 30)	3	(England) Leeds United
16	FW	Flávio	30 December 1979 (aged 28)	47	(Egypt) Al Ahly
17	MF	Zé Kalanga	12 October 1983 (aged 24)	26	(Portugal) Boavista
18	FW	Love	14 March 1979 (aged 28)	36	(Angola) Primeiro de Agosto
19	MF	Dedé	4 July 1981 (aged 26)		(Portugal) Paços de Ferreira
20	DF	Locó	25 December 1984 (aged 23)	14	(Angola) Primeiro de Agosto
21	DF	Delgado	1 November 1979 (aged 28)	20	(France) Metz
22	GK	Mário	1 June 1985 (aged 22)	1	(Angola) Interclube
23	FW	Manucho	7 March 1983 (aged 24)	10	(Angola) Petro Atlético

=== Senegal ===
Head coach: Henryk Kasperczak, then Lamine N'Diaye

No.	Pos.	Player	Date of birth (age)	Caps	Club
1	GK	Tony Sylva	17 May 1975 (aged 32)		(France) Lille
2	DF	Ibrahima Sonko	22 January 1981 (aged 26)		(England) Reading
3	MF	Guirane N'Daw	24 April 1984 (aged 23)		(France) Sochaux
4	DF	Mohamed Sarr	23 December 1983 (aged 24)		(Belgium) Standard Liège
5	DF	Souleymane Diawara	24 December 1978 (aged 29)		(France) Bordeaux
6	DF	Ibrahima Faye	22 October 1979 (aged 28)		(France) Troyes
7	FW	Henri Camara	10 May 1977 (aged 30)		(England) West Ham United
8	FW	Mamadou Niang	13 October 1983 (aged 24)		(France) Marseille
9	FW	Babacar Gueye	2 March 1986 (aged 21)		(France) Metz
10	MF	Ousmane N'Doye	21 March 1978 (aged 29)		(Portugal) Académica de Coimbra
11	FW	El Hadji Diouf (c)	15 January 1981 (aged 27)		(England) Bolton Wanderers
12	DF	Moustapha Bayal Sall	30 November 1985 (aged 22)		(France) Saint-Étienne
13	DF	Lamine Diatta	2 July 1975 (aged 32)		(Turkey) Beşiktaş
14	MF	Papa Waigo	20 January 1984 (aged 24)		(Italy) Genoa
15	MF	Diomansy Kamara	8 November 1980 (aged 27)		(England) Fulham
16	GK	Cheikh N'Diaye	15 February 1985 (aged 22)		(France) Créteil
17	FW	Modou Sougou	18 December 1984 (aged 23)		(Portugal) União de Leiria
18	MF	Frédéric Mendy	6 November 1981 (aged 26)		(France) Bastia
19	MF	Papa Bouba Diop	28 January 1980 (aged 27)		(England) Portsmouth
20	MF	Abdoulaye Faye	26 February 1978 (aged 29)		(England) Newcastle United
21	DF	Habib Beye	19 October 1977 (aged 30)		(England) Newcastle United
22	DF	Papa Malick Ba	11 November 1980 (aged 27)		(Switzerland) Basel
23	GK	Bouna Coundoul	4 March 1982 (aged 25)		(United States) Colorado Rapids

=== South Africa ===
Head coach: Carlos Alberto Parreira

No.	Pos.	Player	Date of birth (age)	Caps	Club
1	GK	Rowen Fernández	28 February 1978 (aged 29)		(Germany) Arminia Bielefeld
2	DF	Bevan Fransman	31 October 1983 (aged 24)		(South Africa) Moroka Swallows
3	DF	Tsepo Masilela	5 May 1985 (aged 22)		(Israel) Maccabi Haifa
4	MF	Aaron Mokoena	25 November 1980 (aged 27)		(England) Blackburn Rovers
5	DF	Nasief Morris	16 April 1981 (aged 26)		(Greece) Panathinaikos
6	MF	Lance Davids	11 April 1985 (aged 22)		(Sweden) Djurgårdens IF
7	DF	Tumelo Nhlapo	20 January 1988 (aged 20)		(South Africa) Bloemfontein Celtic
8	MF	Siphiwe Tshabalala	25 September 1984 (aged 23)		(South Africa) Kaizer Chiefs
9	MF	Surprise Moriri	20 March 1980 (aged 27)		(South Africa) Mamelodi Sundowns
10	MF	Steven Pienaar	17 March 1982 (aged 25)		(England) Everton
11	MF	Elrio van Heerden	11 July 1983 (aged 24)		(Belgium) Club Brugge
12	MF	Teko Modise	22 December 1982 (aged 25)		(South Africa) Orlando Pirates
13	DF	Benson Mhlongo	9 November 1980 (aged 27)		(South Africa) Mamelodi Sundowns
14	MF	Lerato Chabangu	15 August 1985 (aged 22)		(South Africa) Mamelodi Sundowns
15	FW	Sibusiso Zuma	23 June 1975 (aged 32)		(Germany) Arminia Bielefeld
16	GK	Moeneeb Josephs	19 May 1980 (aged 27)		(South Africa) Bidvest Wits
17	FW	Katlego Mphela	29 November 1984 (aged 23)		(South Africa) Supersport United
18	FW	Excellent Walaza	8 April 1987 (aged 20)		(South Africa) Orlando Pirates
19	DF	Bryce Moon	6 April 1986 (aged 21)		(South Africa) Ajax Cape Town
20	DF	Brett Evans	8 March 1982 (aged 25)		(South Africa) Ajax Cape Town
21	FW	Thembinkosi Fanteni	2 February 1984 (aged 23)		(Israel) Maccabi Haifa
22	MF	Kagiso Dikgacoi	24 November 1984 (aged 23)		(South Africa) Golden Arrows
23	GK	Itumeleng Khune	20 June 1987 (aged 20)		(South Africa) Kaizer Chiefs

=== Tunisia ===
Head coach: Roger Lemerre

No.	Pos.	Player	Date of birth (age)	Caps	Club
1	GK	Hamdi Kasraoui	18 January 1983 (aged 25)		(Tunisia) Espérance de Tunis
2	DF	Saïf Ghezal	30 June 1981 (aged 26)		(Switzerland) Young Boys
3	DF	Karim Haggui	20 January 1984 (aged 24)		(Germany) Bayer Leverkusen
4	DF	Wisam El-Abdy	4 February 1979 (aged 28)		(Egypt) Al-Zamalek
5	DF	Wissam El Bekri	16 June 1984 (aged 23)		(Tunisia) Espérance de Tunis
6	DF	Radhouène Felhi	28 March 1984 (aged 23)		(Tunisia) Étoile du Sahel
7	MF	Chaouki Ben Saada	1 July 1984 (aged 23)		(France) Bastia
8	MF	Mehdi Nafti	28 November 1978 (aged 29)		(England) Birmingham City
9	MF	Yassine Chikhaoui	22 September 1986 (aged 21)		(Switzerland) Zürich
10	MF	Kamel Zaïem	25 May 1983 (aged 24)		(Tunisia) Espérance de Tunis
11	FW	Francileudo Silva dos Santos	20 March 1979 (aged 28)		(France) Toulouse
12	MF	Jaouhar Mnari	8 November 1976 (aged 31)		(Germany) 1. FC Nürnberg
13	DF	Saber Ben Frej	3 July 1979 (aged 28)		(Tunisia) Étoile du Sahel
14	MF	Chaker Zouaghi	10 January 1985 (aged 23)		(Russia) Lokomotiv Moscow
15	DF	Radhi Jaïdi	30 August 1975 (aged 32)		(England) Birmingham City
16	GK	Aymen Mathlouthi	14 September 1984 (aged 23)		(Tunisia) Étoile du Sahel
17	FW	Issam Jomaa	28 January 1984 (aged 23)		(France) Caen
18	DF	Yassin Mikari	9 January 1983 (aged 25)		(Switzerland) Grasshoppers
19	DF	Mehdi Meriah	5 June 1979 (aged 28)		(Tunisia) Étoile du Sahel
20	FW	Mehdi Ben Dhifallah	6 May 1983 (aged 24)		(Tunisia) Étoile du Sahel
21	MF	Mejdi Traoui	13 December 1983 (aged 24)		(Tunisia) Étoile du Sahel
22	GK	Adel Nefzi	16 March 1974 (aged 33)		(Tunisia) Club Africain
23	FW	Mohamed Amine Chermiti	26 December 1987 (aged 20)		(Tunisia) Étoile du Sahel
