= Wycliffe (name) =

Wycliffe is a given name and surname.

== John Wycliffe ==
A most notable holder of the name was John Wycliffe (also spelled Wyclif, Wycliff, Wiclef, Wicliffe, Wickliffe) (c. 1320s – 31 December 1384) who was an English scholastic philosopher, theologian, Biblical translator, reformer, and seminary professor at Oxford. He was an influential dissident within the Roman Catholic priesthood during the 14th century. Among other things, Wycliffe Hall, Oxford; Wycliffe College, Toronto; Wycliffe College, Gloucestershire; and the 1841 ship John Wickliffe are named after him.

== People with the given name ==
- Wycliffe Gordon (born 1967), American musician
- Wyc Grousbeck, Wycliffe Grousbeck (born 1961), American entrepreneur
- Wycliffe Bubba Morton (1931–2006), American baseball player
- Wycliffe Juma Oluoch (born 1980), Kenyan footballer
- Wycliff Kambonde (born 1988), Namibian footballer
- Wycliffe Ochomo (born 1990), Kenyan footballer
- Wycliffe Oparanya (born 1956), Kenyan politician
- Wycliff Palu (born 1982), Australian rugby player
- Charles Wycliffe Joiner (1916–2017), American judge

=== People with given names "John Wycliffe" ===
- John Wycliffe Black (1862–1951), an English shoe manufacturer and politician
- John Wycliffe Lowes Forster (1850–1938), a Canadian artist
- John Wycliffe Linnell (1878–1967), an English physician

== People with the surname ==
- Elizabeth Wycliffe (born 1983), Canadian swimmer

== Other people ==
- H. Bedford-Jones (1887–1949), a Canadian writer, used the penname John Wycliffe

== See also ==
- Wyclef Jean (born 1969), Haitian rapper
- Wycliffe (disambiguation)
- Wickliffe (disambiguation)
- Wiglaf
- John Wycliffe: The Morning Star, a 1984 film
