= Stéphane Sessègnon =

Beninese footballer (born 1984)

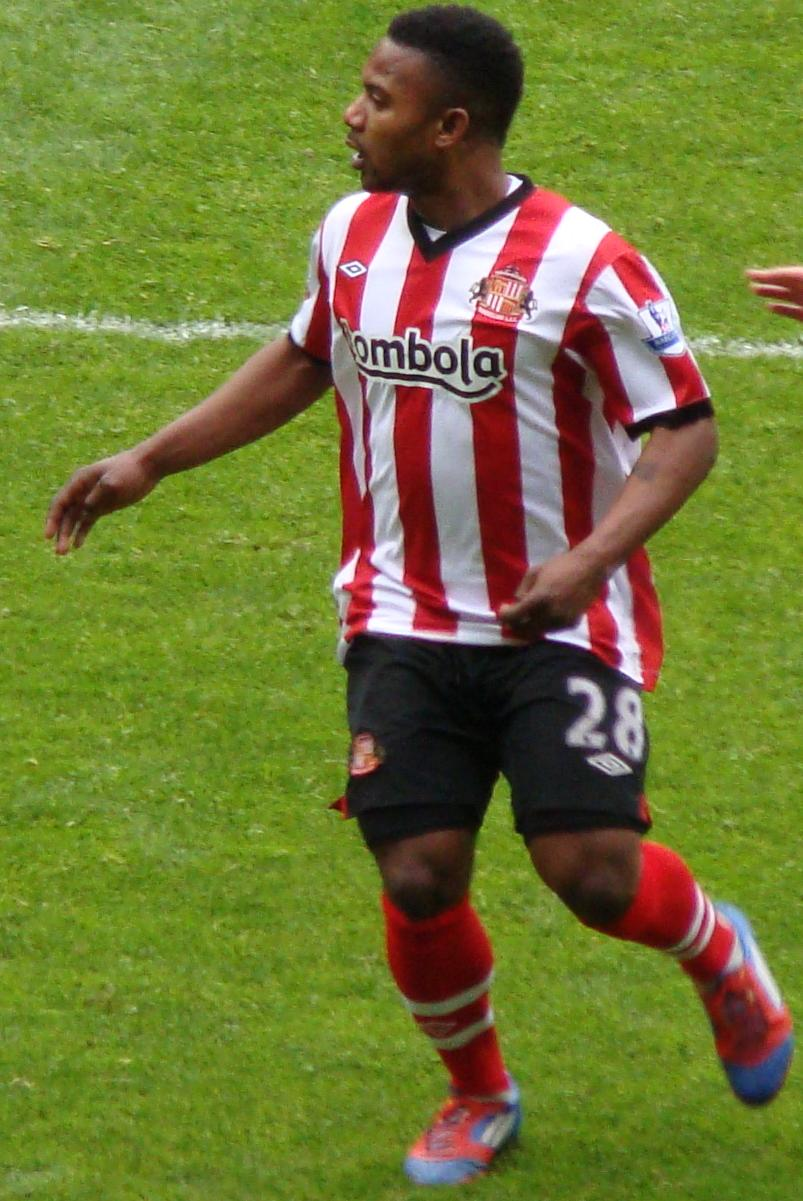
- Sessègnon playing for Sunderland AFC in 2012

Personal information
- Date of birth: 1 June 1984 (age 42)
- Place of birth: Allahé, Benin
- Height: 1.68 m (5 ft 6 in)
- Position: Midfielder

Youth career
- 2000–2003: Requins de l'Atlantique

Senior career*
Years	Team	Apps	(Gls)
2003–2004	Requins de l'Atlantique		
2004–2006	Créteil	68	(10)
2006–2008	Le Mans	61	(6)
2008–2011	Paris Saint-Germain	77	(9)
2011–2013	Sunderland	87	(17)
2013–2016	West Bromwich Albion	79	(8)
2016–2018	Montpellier	43	(3)
2018–2020	Gençlerbirliği	76	(10)
2022	Göçmenköy	0	(0)
2022–2023	Sirens	19	(0)

International career
2004–2023	Benin	89	(24)
- * Club domestic league appearances and goals

Stéphane Sessègnon (born 1 June 1984) is a Beninese former professional footballer. He represented Benin at the 2008, 2010 and 2019 editions of the Africa Cup of Nations. Sessègnon played in a variety of positions as a forward, a winger and as a midfield offensive playmaker. He is Benin's all-time top scorer and appearance maker with 24 international goals in 89 matches.

== Club career ==
=== Early career ===
Sessègnon began his career in Cotonou with Benin Premier League side Requins de l'Atlantique, which means the Sharks of the Atlantic in French. After spending only a year in the club's senior team, he moved to France to join Créteil, based in the Parisian suburbs, where he joined fellow international Noël Séka. Sessègnon made his debut on the opening match day of the 2004–05 Ligue 2 season against Stade Reims as a substitute in a 2–1 defeat. He scored his first goals on 14 January 2005, a brace in a span of four minutes, in a 3–0 win over Gueugnon. Though Créteil finished in 15th position, Sessègnon was labelled a revelation as he was the primary bright spot in helping the club escape relegation.

=== Le Mans ===
Keen on a move to Ligue 1, Sessègnon signed a three-year deal with Le Mans on 19 May 2006. He made his debut for the club in a league match against Troyes, appearing as a substitute in a 2–2 draw. After featuring as a substitute in his first five appearances, and receiving a straight red card in a match against Sedan, he earned his first start on 4 November 2006 against Auxerre. Two weeks later, he scored his first career goal for Le Mans in a 1–1 draw with Rennes.

Initially used as a holding midfielder at Le Mans, Sessègnon was given a more advanced role for the 2007–08 season, often starting on the right side of the midfield or as an attacker. In this new role, he scored both goals in the club's 3–2 defeat to giants Lyon on 1 September 2007. He scored again the following week in a 1–0 victory over Valenciennes. Sessègnon also helped the club reach the semi-finals of the Coupe de la Ligue that season although they lost to Lens in a thrilling 5–4 defeat in extra time, Sessègnon playing the entire 120 minutes.

=== Paris Saint-Germain ===
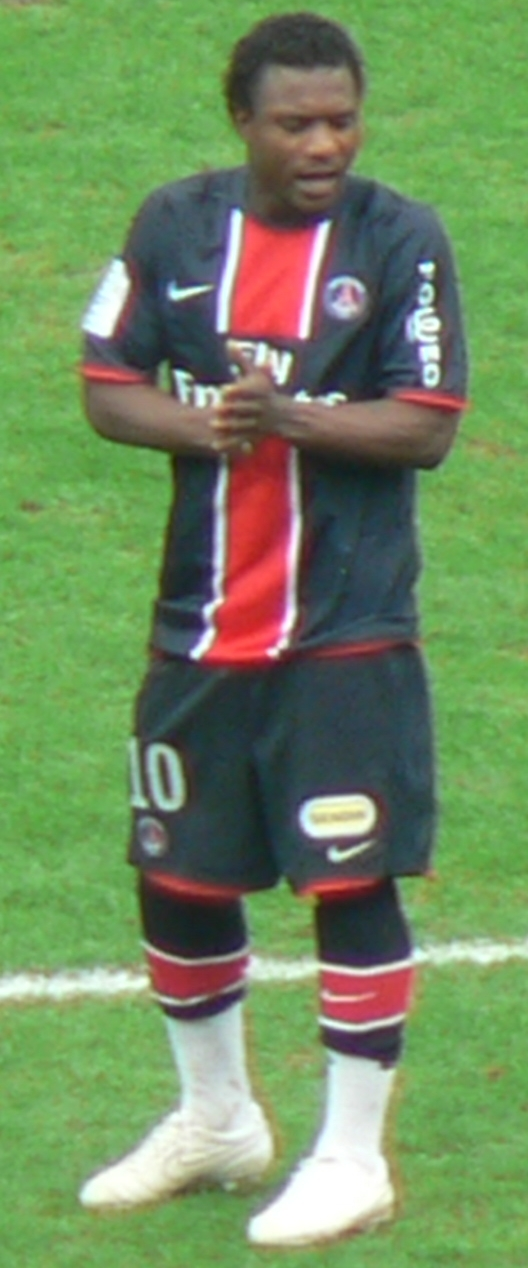
Sessègnon playing a match for PSG against Nice.

Due to his success at Le Mans, Sessègnon was scouted by larger clubs such as Premier League sides Arsenal and Newcastle United. However, he remained in France by signing a four-year deal with Paris Saint Germain. The fee was said to be in the range of €8–10 million.

Sessègnon made his league debut with the club on 16 August 2008, starting in the 1–0 win against Bordeaux. The following match day, he scored his first goal for PSG in a 1–1 draw with Sochaux. On 13 December 2008, Sessègnon scored his third career brace against Auxerre in a 2–1 victory. For his positive performances, he was named the UNFP Player of the Month for December. Sessègnon also appeared in nine matches in the UEFA Cup, scoring one goal against Dutch club Twente.

Several clubs contacted PSG in the off-season to discuss Sessègnon's availability, with Premier League clubs Chelsea, Liverpool, Arsenal, Everton and Manchester City being the primary suitors. Taking advantage of the considerable interest in him, Sessègnon issued a public demand on 23 June that his parent club give him a pay raise, stating, "I think I am one of the best performers in the club." The firing of PSG manager Paul Le Guen also played a role in his demands, and two weeks later, Sessègnon and the club reached an agreement on a contract extension with the player set to receive a substantial pay raise.

In the 2010–11 season, Sessègnon struggled to make an impact with the first team after manager Antoine Kombouaré relegated him to a substitute's role. Friction between player and manager reached its zenith in December 2010, when Sessègnon accused Kombouaré of insulting him during a one-on-one interview ahead of the team's match against Nancy on 19 December. Sessègnon subsequently confirmed his desire to leave the club in the January window and, as a sign of his intent, refused to join Paris Saint-Germain on its winter training camp in Morocco.

=== Sunderland ===
==== 2010–11 season ====
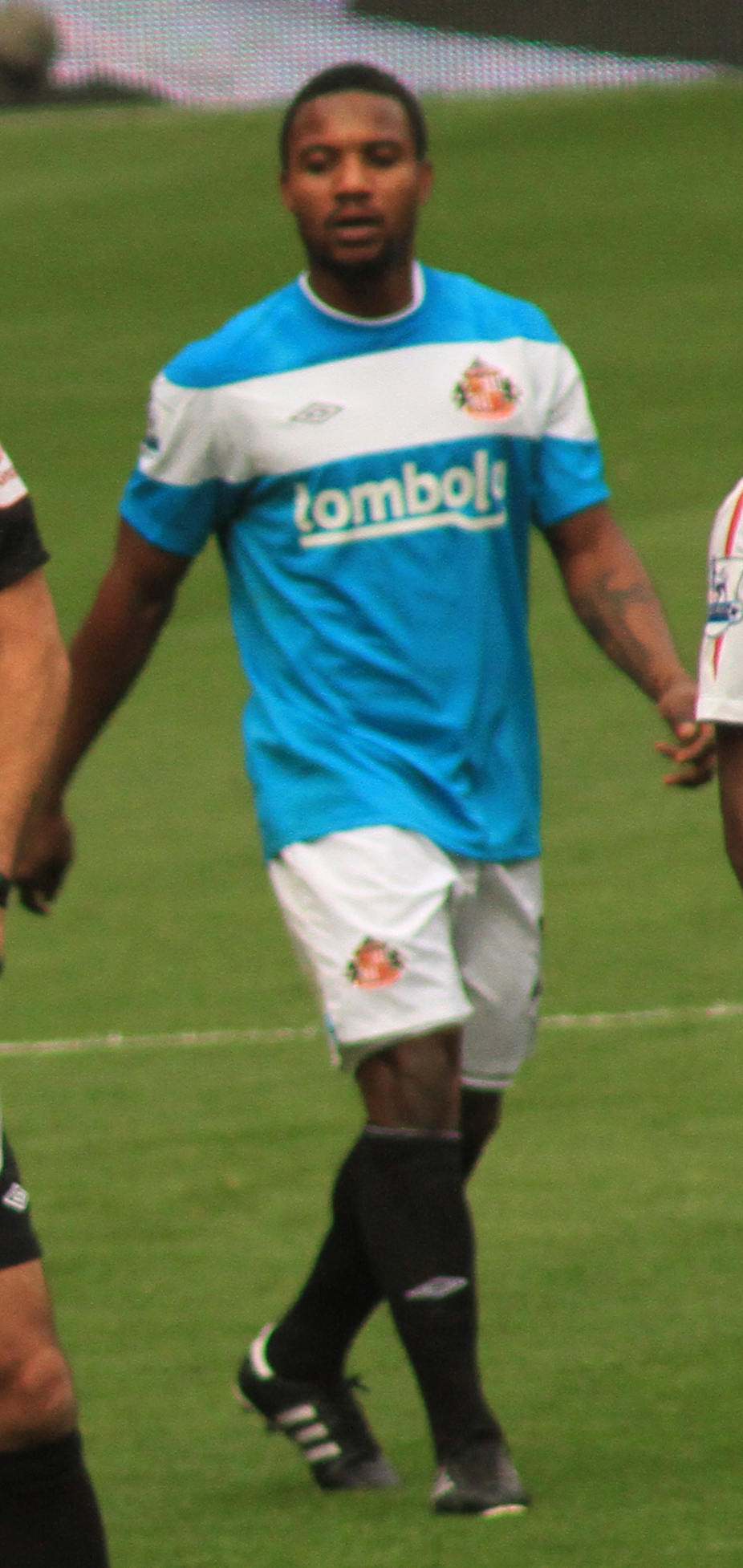
Sessègnon playing for Sunderland in 2011.

On 29 January 2011, Sessègnon departed Paris Saint-Germain to join English club Sunderland. He signed a three-and-a-half-year contract and the transfer fee was priced at £6 million, and made his debut on 1 February against Chelsea. He made his second start for the Black Cats in 3–2 away loss against Stoke City on 5 February 2011. His first real successful moment as a Sunderland player after a disappointing start came on 23 April, where he scored his first goal for the club in the 4–2 win over Wigan Athletic. He converted a penalty of his own making in the 73rd minute, beating Ali Al-Habsi after being tripped by Antolín Alcaraz. Sessègnon had been forced to play in an unfamiliar role as a lone striker, after injuries to strikers Danny Welbeck and Asamoah Gyan during the match.

Sessègnon scored in Sunderland's home defeat against Wolverhampton Wanderers, and again in the final match of the season, a 0–3 win at West Ham United.

==== 2011–12 season ====
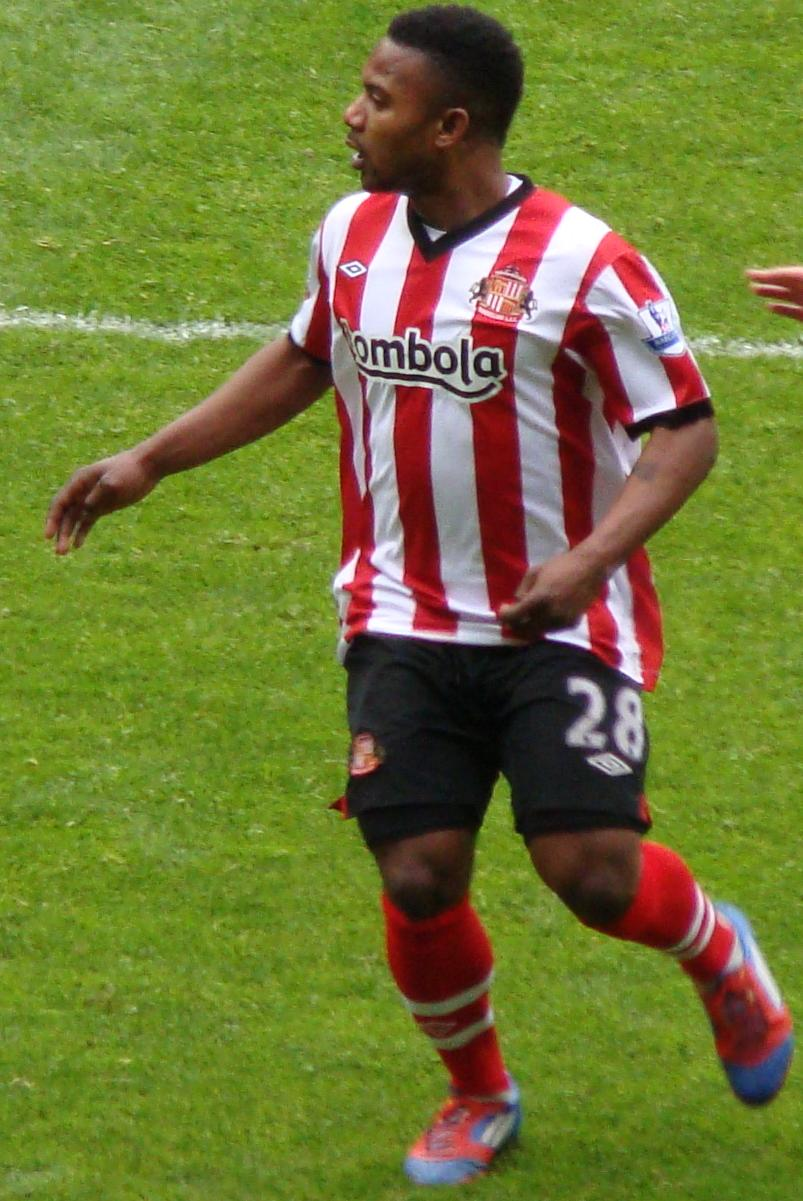
Sessègnon playing for Sunderland in 2012

In his second season at Sunderland, Sessègnon scored his first goal of the season against Bolton Wanderers on 22 October 2011. He followed this up with an 89th-minute equaliser against Aston Villa a week later, also providing an assist and winning man of the match.

On 8 February 2012, in a FA Cup fourth round replay, Sessègnon scored a dramatic late winner against Middlesbrough in the 113th minute during extra time to take Sunderland into the fifth round again Arsenal. On 4 March, he was sent-off in the match against Newcastle United for an elbow to the chest of Cheick Tioté, with Sunderland leading the Tyne-Wear derby 1–0. Newcastle went on to equalise in stoppage time. Sessègnon served a three-match ban returning to score the third goal in Sunderland's 3–1 win against Queens Park Rangers at the Stadium of Light on 24 March. Against Manchester City, although he did not score in the match, he set up two assists, one for a Sebastian Larsson opener in the 31st minute and the second for a Nicklas Bendtner header deep in the first half of injury time to make the match 2–1 for Sunderland at half time. The match finished in a 3–3 draw, with Larsson in the 55th minute scoring to put Sunderland 3–1 ahead after Sessègnon started that attack, then in the 85th minute, Mario Balotelli scored to make the score 3–2 and Aleksandar Kolarov scored Manchester City's equalising goal in the 86th. Sessègnon won the Player of the Season award for the season.

==== 2012–13 season ====
On 30 August 2012, Sessègnon signed a new contract that would keep him at the Stadium of Light until 2015.

In Paolo Di Canio's second match as Sunderland manager, on 14 April 2013, Sessègnon scored against Sunderland's fiercest rivals Newcastle to put Sunderland 1–0 up. Sunderland went on to win the encounter with their rivals 3–0, with Sessègnon assisting David Vaughan for the third goal. The following week, Sessègnon scored the only goal as Sunderland defeated Everton 1–0 at home. His season ended prematurely after he was sent off during Sunderland's 6–1 defeat against Aston Villa. He played 2 games of the 2013–14 season, but due to a falling out with Paolo Di Canio and a drink driving incident, his time at the club was all but over.

=== West Bromwich Albion ===
On 2 September 2013, Sessègnon joined West Bromwich Albion for a club record fee of £5.5 million, rising to £6 million with extras. On 21 September, Sessègnon scored the first goal in a 3–0 win on his debut for West Bromwich Albion against Sunderland, his previous club. On 9 November, he scored against Chelsea in controversial 2–2 draw at Stamford Bridge. On 15 March 2014, Sessegnon scored the first Albion goal of a 1–2 away victory against Swansea City at the Liberty Stadium, helping Pepe Mel gain his first win as head coach. Sessègnon, thus far, has been a fan favourite at the club and his substitution in matches has often lead to a negative reaction from the fans. He scored his first goal of his second season at the club against Manchester United with a well-taken strike in a 2–2 draw at The Hawthorns.

After almost leaving the club at the end of the season after falling out with manager Tony Pulis over selection issues, Sessegnon would return to the first team in the 2015–16 season with consistent performances.

On 18 May 2016, it was announced that Sessègnon and Victor Anichebe would leave the club.

=== Montpellier ===
On 26 September 2016, Sessègnon signed for Ligue 1 side Montpellier on a two-year deal.

=== Gençlerbirliği ===
On 23 January 2018, Sessègnon signed a one-and-a-half-year contract with Süper Lig side Gençlerbirliği.

=== Sirens F.C. ===
In the summer of 2022, Sirens F.C. of the Maltese Premier League managed to sign Stéphane Sessègnon.

== International career ==
Sessègnon made his debut for Benin on 6 June 2004 in a 2006 World Cup qualification match against Cameroon starting in the team's 2–1 loss.

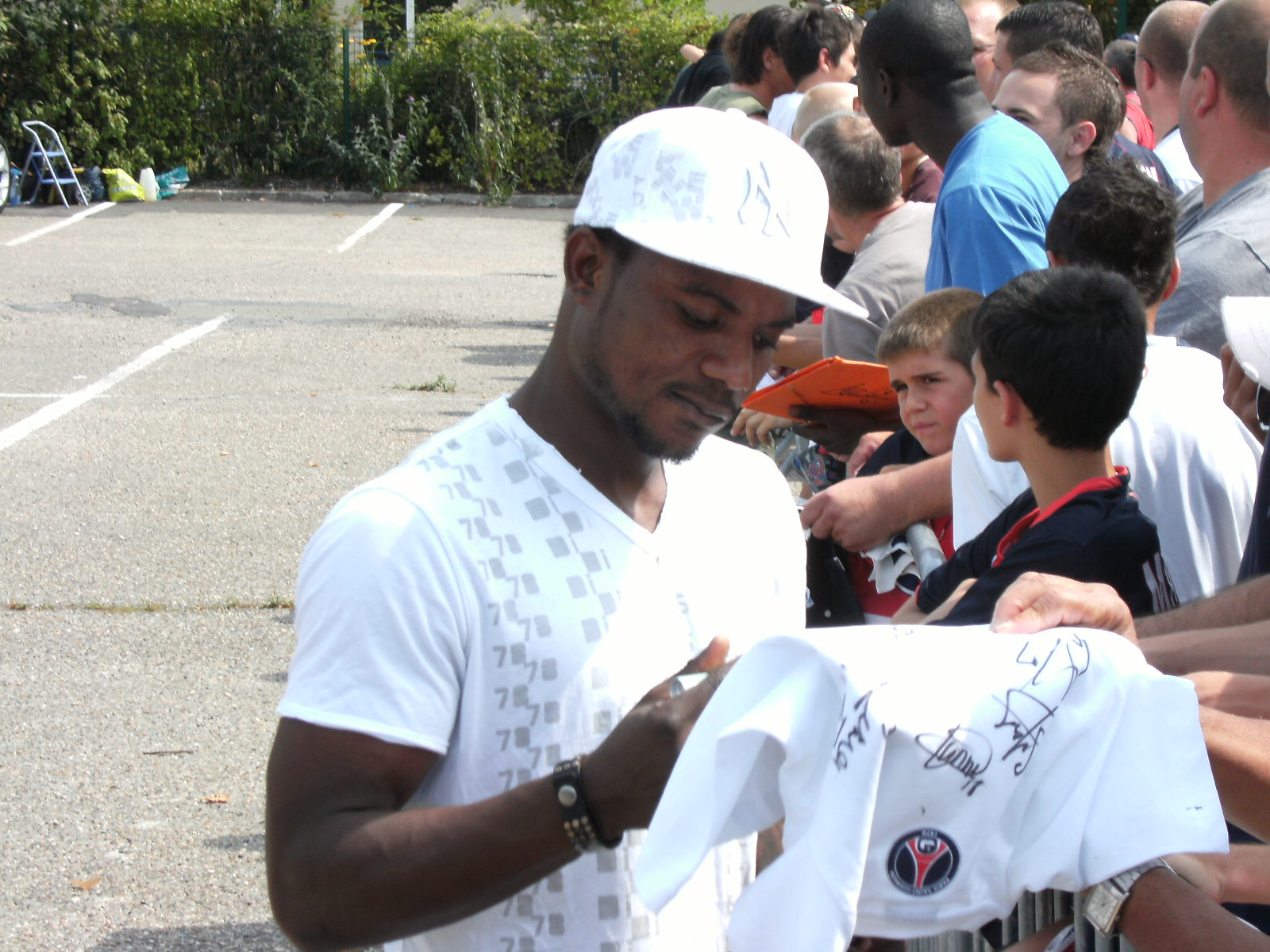
Sessègnon signing autographs in 2009

Sessègnon was the captain of Benin's successful 2019 Africa Cup of Nations campaign, where his side reached the quarter-finals.

== Retirement ==
On 27 May 2025, Stéphane Sessègnon officially announced his retirement from professional football during an interview with Benin national television. At 40 years old, the former captain of the Benin national team concluded a distinguished career marked by passion, talent, and dedication.

== Style of play ==
Upon signing for Sunderland, manager Steve Bruce described Sessègnon as a player who "can play on the left, on the right, through the middle – he's lightning quick and he's a match-winner." Bruce also went on to say, "Stéphane's a little powerhouse with a low centre of gravity, some great dribbling skills and a good shot."

== Personal life ==
He is a distant cousin of twin brothers Ryan, who plays for Fulham and Steven, who plays for AFC Wimbledon.

== Career statistics ==
=== Club ===
Appearances and goals by club, season and competition
Club	Season	League			National cup		League cup		Other		Total	
Club	Season	Division	Apps	Goals	Apps	Goals	Apps	Goals	Apps	Goals	Apps	Goals
Créteil	2004–05	Ligue 2	35	5	0	0	0	0	0	0	35	5
Créteil	2005–06	Ligue 2	33	5	0	0	0	0	0	0	33	5
Créteil	Total		68	10	0	0	0	0	0	0	68	10
Le Mans	2006–07	Ligue 1	31	1	0	0	0	0	0	0	31	1
Le Mans	2007–08	Ligue 1	30	5	0	0	0	0	0	0	30	5
Le Mans	Total		61	6	0	0	0	0	0	0	61	6
Paris Saint-Germain	2008–09	Ligue 1	34	6	2	1	4	0	9 (Note: Appearances in UEFA Europa League)	1	49	8
Paris Saint-Germain	2009–10	Ligue 1	29	3	4	0	0	0	0	0	33	3
Paris Saint-Germain	2010–11	Ligue 1	14	0	0	0	2	0	7 (Note: Six appearances in UEFA Europa League, One appearance in Trophée des Champions)	0	23	0
Paris Saint-Germain	Total		77	9	7	1	6	0	16	1	105	11
Sunderland	2010–11	Premier League	14	3	0	0	0	0	0	0	14	3
Sunderland	2011–12	Premier League	36	7	5	1	1	0	0	0	42	8
Sunderland	2012–13	Premier League	35	7	1	0	3	0	0	0	39	7
Sunderland	2013–14	Premier League	2	0	0	0	0	0	0	0	2	0
Sunderland	Total		87	17	6	1	4	0	0	0	97	18
West Bromwich Albion	2013–14	Premier League	26	5	1	0	1	0	0	0	28	5
West Bromwich Albion	2014–15	Premier League	28	1	3	0	2	0	0	0	33	1
West Bromwich Albion	2015–16	Premier League	25	2	5	0	1	0	0	0	31	2
West Bromwich Albion	Total		79	8	9	0	4	0	0	0	92	8
Montpellier	2016–17	Ligue 1	27	2	1	0	2	0	0	0	30	2
Montpellier	2017–18	Ligue 1	16	1	0	0	0	0	0	0	16	1
Montpellier	Total		43	3	1	0	2	0	0	0	46	3
Gençlerbirliği	2017–18	Süper Lig	16	3	1	0	0	0	0	0	17	3
Gençlerbirliği	2018–19	Süper Lig	30	4	0	0	0	0	0	0	30	4
Gençlerbirliği	2019–20	Süper Lig	30	3	0	0	0	0	0	0	30	3
Gençlerbirliği	Total		76	10	1	0	0	0	0	0	77	10
Sirens	2022-23	Maltese Premier League	19	0	2	0					21	0
Career total			510	63	26	2	16	0	16	1	568	66

=== International ===
Appearances and goals by national team and year
National team	Year	Apps	Goals
Benin	2004	7	0
Benin	2005	4	1
Benin	2006	1	0
Benin	2007	7	2
Benin	2008	9	1
Benin	2009	6	0
Benin	2010	5	2
Benin	2011	4	2
Benin	2012	5	0
Benin	2013	2	1
Benin	2014	6	4
Benin	2015	5	3
Benin	2016	4	3
Benin	2017	5	2
Benin	2018	3	0
Benin	2019	10	3
Benin	2022	2	0
Benin	2023	4	0
Total		89	24

Scores and results list Benin's goal tally first, score column indicates score after each Sessègnon goal.

List of international goals scored by Stéphane Sessègnon
No.	Date	Venue	Opponent	Score	Result	Competition
1	4 September 2005	Arab Contractors Stadium, Cairo, Egypt	Egypt	1–2	1–4	2006 FIFA World Cup qualification
2	17 June 2007	Stade de l'Amitié, Cotonou, Benin	Togo	2–0	4–1	2008 Africa Cup of Nations qualification
3	21 November 2007	Ohene Djan Stadium, Accra, Ghana	Ghana	1–0	2–4	Ghana Four Nations Tournament (Friendly)
4	8 June 2008	Stade de l'Amitié, Cotonou, Benin	Uganda	3–1	4–1	2010 FIFA World Cup qualification
5	6 January 2010	Stade de Kégué, Lomé, Togo	Libya	1–0	1–0	Friendly
6	9 October 2010	Amahoro Stadium, Kigali, Rwanda	Rwanda	3–0	3–0	2012 Africa Cup of Nations qualification
7	5 June 2011	Stade de l'Amitié, Cotonou, Benin	Ivory Coast	1–3	2–6	2012 Africa Cup of Nations qualification
8	5 June 2011	Stade de l'Amitié, Cotonou, Benin	Ivory Coast	2–3	2–6	2012 Africa Cup of Nations qualification
9	16 June 2013	Stade du 26 Mars, Bamako, Mali	Mali	1–0	2–2	2014 FIFA World Cup qualification
10	17 May 2014	Estádio Nacional 12 de Julho, São Tomé, São Tomé and Príncipe	São Tomé and Príncipe	1–0	2–0	2015 Africa Cup of Nations qualification
11	17 May 2014	Estádio Nacional 12 de Julho, São Tomé, São Tomé and Príncipe	São Tomé and Príncipe	2–0	2–0	2015 Africa Cup of Nations qualification
12	1 June 2014	Stade de l'Amitié, Cotonou, Benin	São Tomé and Príncipe	2–0	2–0	2015 Africa Cup of Nations qualification
13	20 July 2014	Stade de l'Amitié, Cotonou, Benin	Malawi	1–0	1–0	2015 Africa Cup of Nations qualification
14	14 June 2015	Estadio de Bata, Bata, Equatorial Guinea	Equatorial Guinea	1–0	1–1	2017 Africa Cup of Nations qualification
15	6 September 2015	Stade de l'Amitié, Cotonou, Benin	Mali	1–1	1–1	2017 Africa Cup of Nations qualification
16	12 November 2015	Stade de l'Amitié, Cotonou, Benin	Burkina Faso	1–0	2–1	2018 FIFA World Cup qualification
17	27 March 2016	Stade de l'Amitié, Cotonou, Benin	South Sudan	1–0	4–1	2017 Africa Cup of Nations qualification
18	27 March 2016	Stade de l'Amitié, Cotonou, Benin	South Sudan	4–1	4–1	2017 Africa Cup of Nations qualification
19	4 September 2016	Stade du 26 Mars, Bamako, Mali	Mali	2–5	2–5	2017 Africa Cup of Nations qualification
20	11 June 2017	Stade de l'Amitié, Cotonou, Benin	Gambia	1–0	1–0	2019 Africa Cup of Nations qualification
21	12 November 2017	Stade de l'Amitié, Cotonou, Benin	Tanzania	1–0	1–1	Friendly
22	11 June 2019	Stade de Marrakech, Marrakesh, Morocco	Guinea	1–0	1–0	Friendly
23	6 September 2019	Stade Michel d'Ornano, Caen, France	Ivory Coast	1–0	1–2	Friendly
24	13 November 2019	Godswill Akpabio International Stadium, Uyo, Nigeria	Nigeria	1–0	1–2	2021 Africa Cup of Nations qualification

== Honours ==
PSG

- Coupe de France: 2009–10

Benin

- Ghana Four Nations Tournament runner-up: 2007

Individual

- Special Award for services to the national team
- Ligue 1 Team of the Season: 2008–09
