= Sosthene =

Sosthene is a given name. Notable people with the name include:

- Sosthène Fernandez (1923–2006), Cambodian general
- Sosthène Léopold Bayemi Matjei (born 1964), Cameroonian bishop
- Sosthene Moguenara (born 1989), German-Chadian long jumper
- Sosthène Soglo (born 1986), Beninese footballer
- Sosthène Weis (1872–1941), Luxembourgian artist
- Sosthene Yao (born 1987), Ivorian footballer
- Claude Sosthene Grasset d'Orcet (1828–1900), French archaeologist
- Sosthènes I de La Rochefoucauld (1785–1864), French politician
- Sosthène II de La Rochefoucauld (1825–1908), French politician
