= Chinyama =

Chinyama is a surname. Notable people with the surname include:

- James Ralph Nthinda Chinyama, president of the Nyasaland African Congress
- Takesure Chinyama, a Zimbabwean footballer
- Willy Chinyama, a Zimbabwean footballer
