= Bekri =

Bekri may refer to:

== People with the forename ==
- Bekri Mustafa Pasha (d. 1690), Ottoman official

== People with the surname ==
- Hafsa Bekri (born 1948), Moroccan poet
- Nur Bekri (born 1961), Chinese politician
- Sara El Bekri (born 1987), Moroccan swimmer
- Tahar Bekri (born 1951), Tunisian poet
- Wissam El Bekri (1984), French-Tunisian football player
