= Désiré Segbé Azankpo =

Beninese footballer

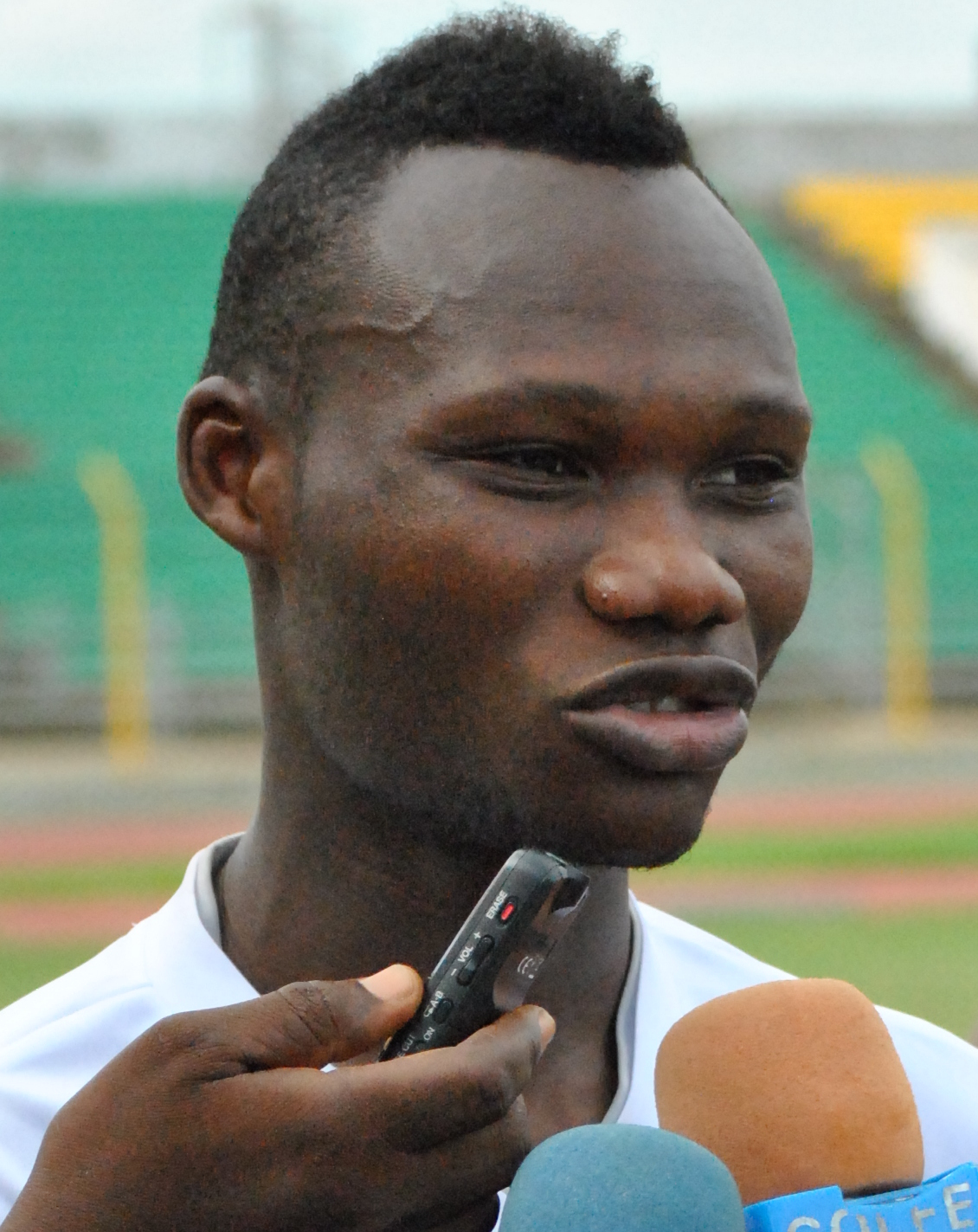
- Segbé Azankpo with Benin in 2014

Personal information
- Full name: Désiré Segbé Azankpo
- Date of birth: 6 May 1993 (age 33)
- Place of birth: Allahé, Benin
- Height: 1.80 m (5 ft 11 in)
- Position: Centre forward

Team information
- Current team: Cannes

Senior career*
Years	Team	Apps	(Gls)
2010–2012	Génération Foot		
2012–2013	Metz B	28	(1)
2013–2014	Jeunesse Esch	11	(6)
2014–2015	Le Puy	19	(7)
2015–2017	Pagny-sur-Moselle	21	(12)
2017–2018	Épinal	22	(11)
2018–2019	Senica	25	(4)
2019–2020	Oldham Athletic	28	(4)
2020–2021	Villefranche	20	(6)
2021–2022	Dunkerque	17	(1)
2022	→ Dinamo București (loan)	2	(1)
2022–2023	Bayern Munich II	28	(12)
2023–2024	Seraing	11	(2)
2024–2025	Kotwica Kołobrzeg	6	(2)
2025–	Cannes	0	(0)

International career
2014–2022	Benin	16	(0)
- * Club domestic league appearances and goals as of 16:39, 18 January 2025 (UTC)

Désiré Segbé Azankpo (born 6 May 1993) is a Beninese professional footballer who plays as a centre-forward for French club Cannes.

== Club career ==
Born in Allahé, Segbé Azankpo has played club football for Génération Foot, Metz B, Jeunesse Esch, Le Puy, Pagny-sur-Moselle, and Épinal.

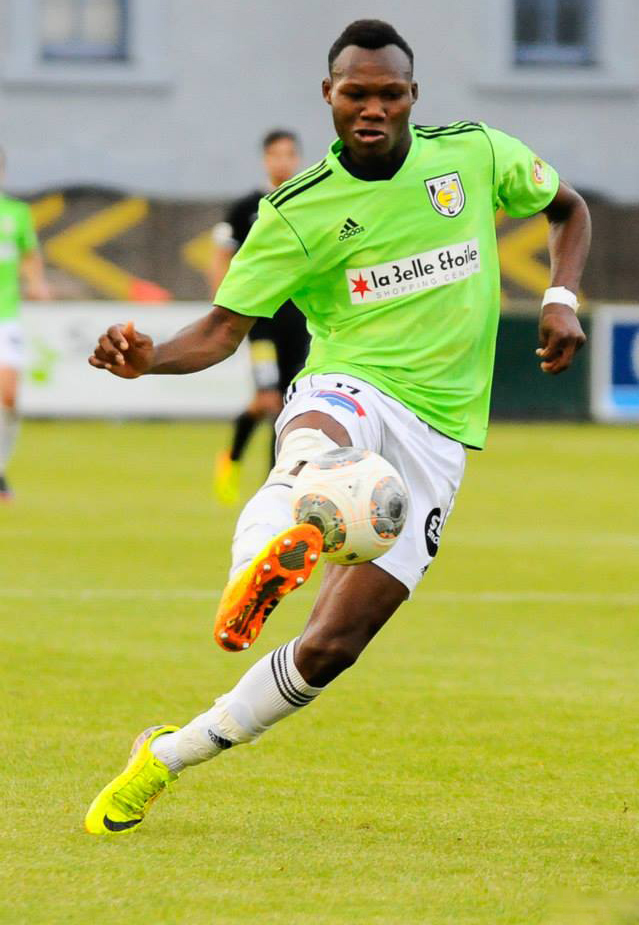
Segbé Azankpo playing for Jeunesse Esch in 2014.

Segbé Azankpo signed for Slovak club FK Senica in July 2018. He signed a one-year contract with English club Oldham Athletic on 23 July 2019, with the option of a further year. He was released by Oldham at the end of the 2019–20 season.

In October 2020, Segbé Azankpo signed for FC Villefranche in the French Championnat National.

On 22 June 2021, he signed a two-year contract with Dunkerque. He was loaned to Liga I club Dinamo București on 1 February 2022.

On 31 July 2022, Segbé Azankpo signed for German club Bayern Munich II, on a two-year contract.

On 7 September 2023, he joined Seraing in Belgium on a one-season contract.

On 27 September 2024, he signed with Polish second-tier club Kotwica Kołobrzeg. He made his debut two days later, entering the pitch in the 64th minute and opening the scoring seven minutes later in a 1–1 away draw with Miedź Legnica.

On 31 January 2025, Segbé Azankpo returned to France to join Cannes.

== International career ==
Segbé Azankpo made his international debut for Benin in 2014, and was part of the squad for the 2019 African cup of Nations.

== Career statistics ==
=== International ===
Appearances and goals by national team and year
National team	Year	Apps	Goals
Benin
Benin	2014	2	0
Benin	2018	4	0
Benin	2019	1	0
Benin	2020	1	0
Benin	2021	6	0
Benin	2022	2	0
Total		16	0
