= Mbarga =

Mbarga is a surname. Notable people with the surname include:

- Prince Nico Mbarga, (1950–1997), Nigerian musician
- Joséphine Mbarga-Bikié (born 1979), Cameroonian long jumper
- Janvier Charles Mbarga (born 1985), Cameroonian footballer
- Franck Mbarga, Cameroonian footballer
