= Alsény Camara =

Alsény Camara is the name of:

- Alsény Camara (footballer, born 1986), Guinean footballer who played as a defender
- Alsény Camara (footballer, born 1995), a.k.a. Alsény Camara Agogo, Guinean footballer who played as a forward
- Alsény Camara (footballer, born 1996), a.k.a. Alsény Camara Cantona, Guinean footballer who played as a defender
