= Kennedy Nketani =

Zambian footballer (born 1984)

Kennedy Nketani (born 25 December 1984) is a Zambian football defender. He currently plays for Zanaco F.C. in Zambia; he formerly played for Makumbi Stars and City of Lusaka F.C. He has 30 international Caps for Zambia.

== Early career ==
Nketani began his career with division two side UNZA (Makumbi) stars under the tutorship of Simataa Simataa. At stars, Zambia international strikers James Chamanga and Adubelo Phiri were his teammates. He then moved to City of Lusaka and within months at Woodlands Stadium he forced his way into ‘City Ya Moto’ back four.

In 2003, the then ZANACO coach, Fighton Simukonda snapped the 19-year-old centre back. Nkhetani helped ZANACO claim the FAZ Premier League title in 2003. The tall defender won the Coca-Cola Cup and played in the final of BP top Eight although ZANACO lost in 2004.

His progress at ZANACO saw him called to the Kalusha Bwalya drilled Chipolopolo Boys and earned his international bow against Emmanuel Adebayor's rampaging Togo in 2005. Nkhetani and goalkeeper Kalililo Kakonje were blamed for the 4–1 loss to Togo that ended Zambia's hopes of a maiden appearance at the World Cup. But that did not hinder the rigid (nicknamed Concrete) defender as he saw off the challenge from Billy Mwanza and Sashi Chalwe to win the right to partner ageing Elijah Tana at centre back.

Nketani played for the Zambia national football team at the 2006 Africa Cup of Nations finals. He also participated in the 2008 Africa Cup of Nations finals.
