= Wycliffe =

Wycliffe may refer to:

== People ==
- John Wycliffe (and other spellings) (c.1320s – 1384), English theologian and Bible translator
- Wycliffe (name), includes a list of other people with the name

== Places ==
- Wycliffe, British Columbia, a village
- Wycliffe, County Durham, a village (historically in Yorkshire)
- Wycliffe, Modesto, California, a neighborhood of Modesto

== Schools and colleges ==
- Wycliffe College, Gloucestershire, an English independent school
- Wycliffe College, Toronto, a Canadian graduate theological school
- Wycliffe Christian School, an Australian independent school in New South Wales
- Wycliffe Hall, Oxford, an English theological college of the University of Oxford

== Arts and entertainment ==
- Wycliffe (TV series), a British television detective series
  - Charles Wycliffe, a fictional detective created by W. J. Burley, on whose books the television series is based

== Other uses ==
- Wycliffe Global Alliance, an alliance of Bible translating organisations
  - Wycliffe Bible Translators (UK & Ireland)
  - Wycliffe USA
- Wycliffe's Bible, a group of Bible translations into Middle English under John Wycliffe
- John Wickliffe (ship), 1841

== See also ==
- Wickliffe (disambiguation)
- Wiglaf
- John Wycliffe: The Morning Star, a 1984 film
- Wyclef Jean (born 1969), Haitian rapper, musician and actor
