= Abou Maïga =

Beninese footballer (born 1985)

Personal information
- Full name: Abou Gariga Maïga
- Date of birth: 20 September 1985 (age 41)
- Place of birth: Allahé, Benin
- Height: 1.84 m (6 ft 0 in)
- Position: Forward

Senior career*
Years	Team	Apps	(Gls)
2003–2004	Requins		
2004–2009	Créteil	56	(8)
2006–2007	→ Louhans-Cuiseaux (loan)	25	(5)
2009–2010	Changé		
2010–2011	Al-Mesaimeer		
2011	Changé	12	(3)
2011–2012	Locminé	16	(14)
2012–2016	Saint-Malo	106	(36)
2017	Châteaubriant	12	(2)
2017–2018	Vitré	19	(7)
2018–2019	Cannes	17	(4)
2019	La Tamponnaise	11	(1)

International career
2004–2013	Benin	33	(4)
- * Club domestic league appearances and goals

Abou Gariga Maïga (born 20 September 1985) is a Beninese former professional footballer who played as a forward.

== Club career ==
Maïga was born in Allahé, Benin and came to France in 2004. His Beninese club was Requins de l'Atlantique FC.

== International career ==
Maïga played at the 2005 FIFA World Youth Championship, scoring one goal.
