= Fodé Mansaré =

Guinean footballer (born 1981)

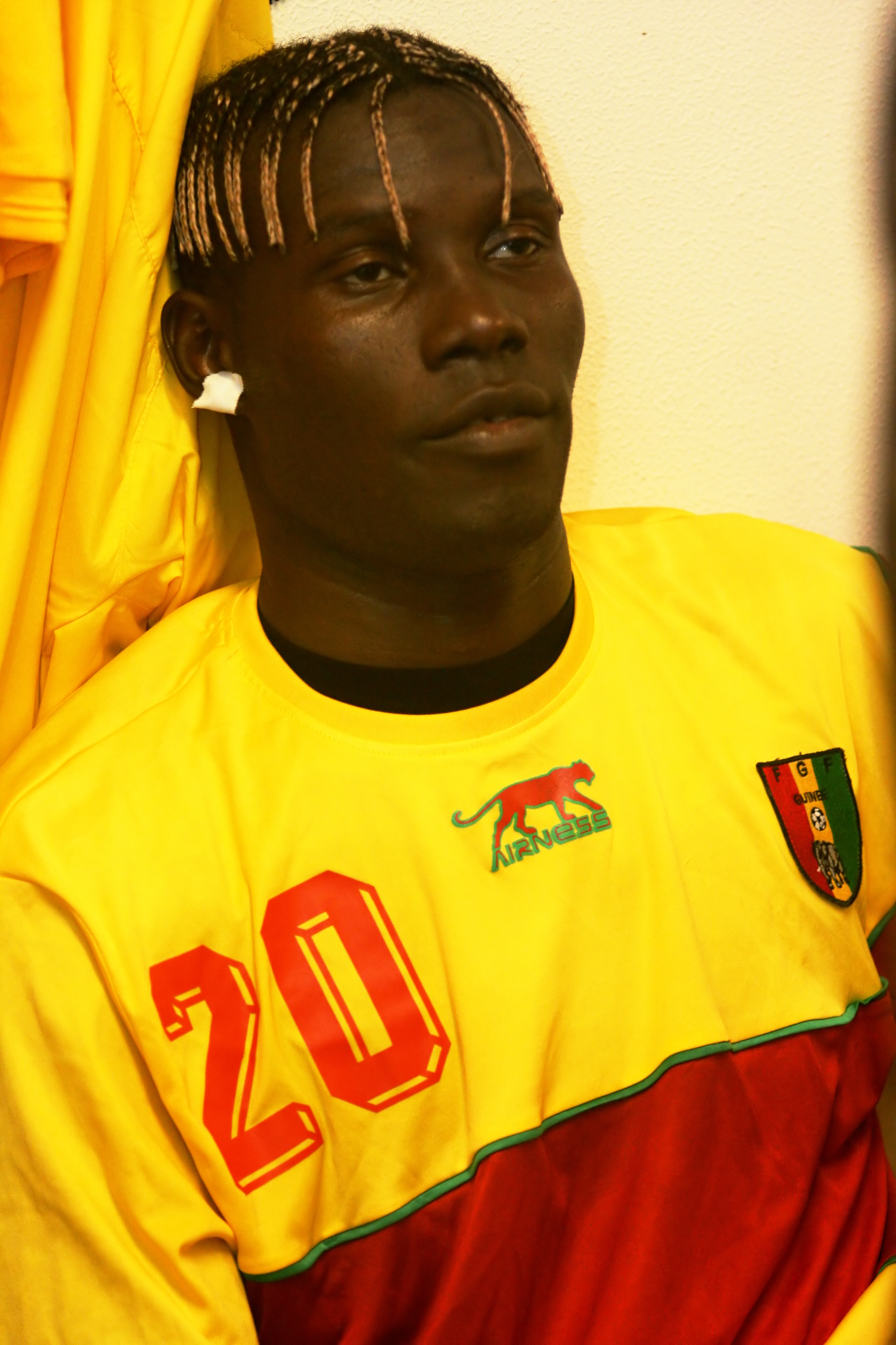
- Mansaré in 2006 with Guinea

Personal information
- Date of birth: 3 September 1981 (age 45)
- Place of birth: Conakry, Guinea
- Height: 1.75 m (5 ft 9 in)
- Position: Winger

Youth career
- 1997–1998: Atlético Coléah
- 1998–1999: Gazélec Ajaccio
- 1999–2001: Montpellier

Senior career*
Years	Team	Apps	(Gls)
2001–2005	Montpellier	121	(14)
2005–2011	Toulouse	135	(7)
2013	Cacereño	1	(0)
Total		257	(21)

International career
2002–2010	Guinea	60	(8)
- * Club domestic league appearances and goals

Fodé Mansaré (born 3 September 1981) is a Guinean former professional footballer who played as a winger. Between 2001 and 2011 made over 100 appearances each for both Montpellier HSC and Toulouse FC. In 2013, after being without a club for two years he joined Spanish third-tier side CP Cacereño but only played one match before being released. He played for the Guinea national team between 2002 and 2010.

== Club career ==
Mansaré was born in Conakry, Guinea. He began his career with the Championnat National side Gazélec Ajaccio before moving to Montpellier HSC in 2001. He stayed at the Ligue 1 side until the end of the 2004–05 season when his side were relegated to Ligue 2.

=== Toulouse ===
In June 2005 Mansaré moved to French top-flight outfit Toulouse FC for €9m, where he has appeared in various UEFA Champions League and UEFA Cup matches. Mansaré made his debut for Toulouse against AC Ajaccio where he assisted Toulouse's only goal of the match. Mansare scored his first goal against Nantes.

Due to Mansaré's impressive performances in 2008, many European teams such as Liverpool, Valencia, Sevilla, Werder Bremen and Hamburger SV were rumoured to be interested in purchasing him, and Sevilla offered €4 million for Mansaré. Toulouse declined the offer as Mansaré was a key player in the starting line-up playing as right winger.

Mansaré was released in 2011 after six years at the French club.

=== Cacereño ===
After two years without a club, Mansaré signed for Spanish Segunda División B side CP Cacereño in August 2013. His short stay there was blighted by injuries and he played just four minutes in two matches against La Hoya Lorca and Xerez before being released in December.

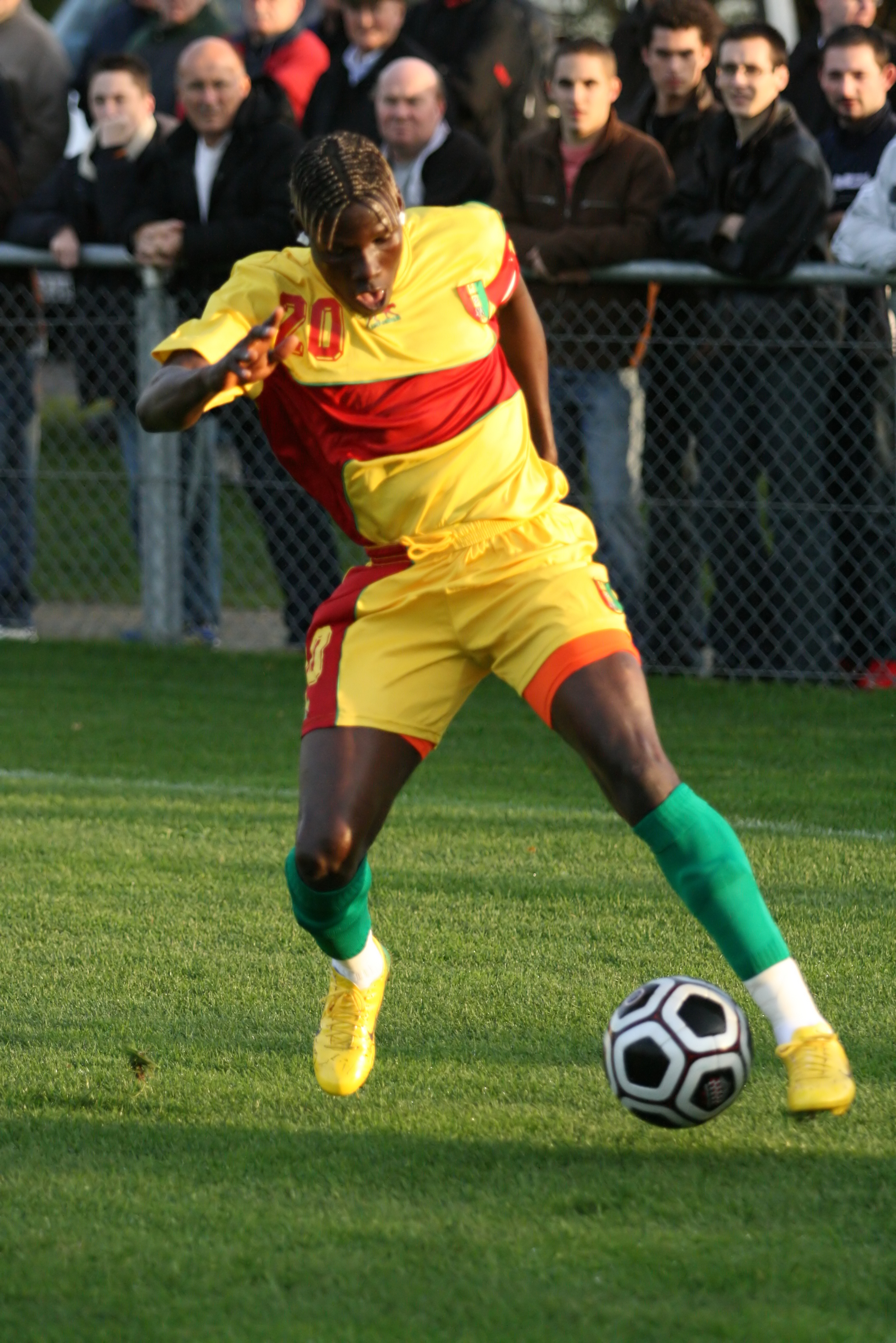

== International career ==
Mansaré was a regular for the Guinea national side. He was part of the Guinean 2004 African Cup of Nations team, who finished second in their group in the first round of competition, before losing in the quarter-finals to Mali. He has at least played 66+ games and scored eight goals for the Guinea. He was also nominated best midfielder of the African Cup of Nations of 2006.

He was part of the Guinea squad for the 2008 African Cup of Nations but missed the first game against host nation Ghana due to suspension. He was restored to the starting eleven however for the match against Morocco and was replaced in the 78th minute by young defensive midfielder Mohamed Sakho following the sending-off of captain Pascal Feindouno.
