= Athiel Mbaha =

Namibian footballer (born 1976)

Personal information
- Date of birth: 5 December 1976 (age 49)
- Place of birth: Windhoek, South West Africa
- Height: 1.93 m (6 ft 4 in)
- Position: Goalkeeper

Senior career*
Years	Team	Apps	(Gls)
1998–2003	African Stars		
2003–2006	Blue Waters		
2006–2007	Black Leopards	8	(0)
2007–2008	Orlando Pirates Windhoek		
2008–2009	Maritzburg United	3	(0)
2009–2010	Orlando Pirates Windhoek		
2010–2012	Ramblers		
2012–2013	United Africa Tigers		
2013–2016	African Stars		

International career
2005–2014	Namibia	36	(0)
- * Club domestic league appearances and goals

Athiel Mbaha (born 5 December 1976) is a Namibian former footballer who played as a goalkeeper for the Namibia national football team. He also played for Namibian sides African Stars, Blue Waters, Orlando Pirates, Ramblers and United Africa Tigers and South African sides Black Leopards and Maritzburg United. A member of the Namibia national football team, Mbaha competed at the 2008 Africa Cup of Nations, playing against Ghana and Guinea, and was capped 36 times by Namibia. Mbaha has been deaf since the age of seven. He also plays chess.

== Club career ==
Having started his career at African Stars in 1998, Mbaha joined fellow Namibia Premier League side Blue Waters in 2003, where he won the Namibia Premier League in his first season at the club. Following a further two years at the club, Mbaha joined South African Premier Division side Black Leopards in 2006, and became a regular player at the club in the early parts of the season. However, he left Black Leopards in January 2007 when his contract with the club was not renewed, having made 8 appearances for the club.

In the summer of 2007, he returned to Namibia, signing for Namibia Premier League side Orlando Pirates. He remained at Orlando Pirates for a year and won the Namibia Premier League with the club, the club's first ever title. In August 2008, Mbaha joined South African side Maritzburg United. However, his appearances at the club were limited and he was back-up to American goalkeeper Hunter Gilstrap for most of the season, and made just 3 league appearances as a result. Mbaha would eventually return to Orlando Pirates in the summer of 2009. Mbaha joined Ramblers in the summer of 2010, and remained at the club for two years, before joining United Africa Tigers in 2012.

Mbaha rejoined his first club African Stars in 2013, where he would remain until the end of his career. Mbaha won the Namibia Premier League for the third time in the 2014–15 season, and he also won the Best Goalkeeper of the Season award for that season. He left the club at the end of the 2015–16 season.

== International career ==
Mbaha made his debut for the Namibia national football team on 19 March 2005 in an international friendly match against Lesotho, in which Namibia won 2–1. His first competitive international appearance came the following month in a COSAFA Cup match against Botswana where despite a penalties defeat to Botswana, Mbaha was praised for his performance. He would become a regular player for Namibia, appearing in the 2006 and 2007 COSAFA Cup tournaments, as well as the 2008 Africa Cup of Nations qualification, as Namibia qualified for only their second major tournament of their history, alongside multiple international friendlies.

Mbaha was part of the Namibia squad at the 2008 Africa Cup of Nations, and though he missed the opening game of the tournament as they were defeated 5–1 by Morocco, he appeared in their 1–0 defeat to Ghana and a 1–1 draw with Guinea as Namibia were eliminated in the group stage. During 2008, Mbaha went on to appear in the 2008 COSAFA Cup as well as Namibia's failed 2010 FIFA World Cup qualification bid. Mbaha would remain a regular player for Namibia until 2011, where he would be displaced from his regular place in Namibia's team by Ephraim Tjihonge. He would make one final appearance for Namibia in 2014, in a 1–0 friendly defeat at home to Ghana, where he would fail to control a back-pass, resulting in a Namibia defeat.

== Personal life ==
Mbaha has been deaf since the age of seven. He usually communicated with his teammates through screaming at them, whilst fellow Namibia goalkeeper Ephraim Tjihonge often helped him to communicate. Mbaha plays chess, having first taken up the board game in 2013, and is a member of the Namibia Chess Federation. Since retiring from football, Mbaha has taught chess to young people in his community.
