= Wickliffe =

Wickliffe may refer to:

== People ==
- Charles A. Wickliffe (1788—1869), a U.S. Representative from Kentucky
- Dean Wickliffe, a New Zealander convicted of murder
- Gustavus Woodson Wickliffe (1869–1921) American lawyer
- John Wickliffe or John Wycliffe (c. 1320–1384), English philosopher, theologian, preacher, translator, reformer and teacher
- Letty M. Wickliffe (1902-2001), African-American educator
- Robert C. Wickliffe, (1819—1895), Lieutenant Governor and Governor of Louisiana
- Robert Charles Wickliffe, (1874–1912, grandson of Charles A. Wickliffe and cousin of John Crepps Wickliffe Beckham), a U.S. Representative from Louisiana

== Places ==
in Australia

- Wickliffe, Victoria

in the United States

- Wickliffe, Indiana
- Wickliffe, Kentucky
- Wickliffe (New Roads, Louisiana), listed on the National Register of Historic Places in Pointe Coupee Parish, Louisiana
- Wickliffe, Ohio
- Wickliffe, Oklahoma
- Wickliffe, Virginia

== See also ==
- Wycliffe (disambiguation)
