= El Muez Mahgoub =

Sudanese footballer

Elmuez Mahjoub
Personal information
- Full name: Elmuez Mahjoub Abdallah Elhadi
- Date of birth: August 14, 1978 (age 48)
- Place of birth: Omdurman, Khartoum State, Sudan
- Height: 1.90 m (6 ft 3 in)
- Position: Goalkeeper

Senior career*
Years	Team	Apps	(Gls)
1996–1997	Al-Ahrar SC (Omdurman)		
1998–2002	Al-Mourada SC		
2003–2014	Al-Hilal Club		
2015–2016	Al-Merrikh SC		
2017–2018	Al Rabita Kosti		
2018–2020	Hay Al Wadi SC (Nyala)		

International career
1998–2001	Sudan U23	3	(0)
2002–2015	Sudan	78	(0)
Medal record
Men's football
Representing Sudan
CECAFA Cup
Winner	2006 Ethiopia
Third place	2011 Tanzania
- * Club domestic league appearances and goals

Elmuez Mahjoub (born 14 August 1978) is the goalkeeper of the Sudanese football club Hay Al Wadi SC (Nyala) in the Sudan Premier League. He is also a member of the Sudan national football team.

== Honours ==
Sudan

- CECAFA Cup: 2006; 3rd place, 2011
