= Amir Damar Koku =

Sudanese footballer

Personal information
- Full name: Amir Damar Koku
- Date of birth: 8 December 1979 (age 46)
- Place of birth: Khartoum, Sudan
- Height: 1.79 m (5 ft 10 in)
- Position: Defender

Senior career*
Years	Team	Apps	(Gls)
1999–2001	Hay Al-Arab SC		
2002–2009	Al-Merreikh SC		

International career
2003–2008	Sudan	34	(0)
- * Club domestic league appearances and goals

Amir Damar Koku (born 8 December 1979) is a Sudanese footballer who plays central defender.

== International career ==
Koku played for the Sudan for the 2008 African Cup of Nations and World Cup qualifications 2010.
