= Abisai Shiningayamwe =

Namibian footballer (born 1978)

Personal information
- Date of birth: 16 May 1978 (age 48)
- Place of birth: Walvis Bay, South Africa
- Height: 1.89 m (6 ft 2 in)
- Position: Goalkeeper

Senior career*
Years	Team	Apps	(Gls)
2000–2005	Blue Waters		
2005–2006	Civics		
2006–2013	Jomo Cosmos	22	(0)
2013–2017	Orlando Pirates Windhoek		
Total		22+	(0+)

International career
2006–2008	Namibia	11	(0)
- * Club domestic league appearances and goals

Abisai Shiningayamwe (born 16 May 1978) is a Namibian former footballer who played as a goalkeeper.

== Career ==
Shiningayamwe is a permanent resident of South Africa and plays for ABSA Premier League side Jomo Cosmos.

Shiningayamwe played in Namibia's first group stage match of the 2008 African Nations Cup finals, a 5–1 loss to Morocco.
