= Franklin April =

Namibian footballer (1984-2015)

Personal information
- Date of birth: 18 April 1984
- Place of birth: Windhoek, South West Africa
- Date of death: 18 October 2015 (aged 31)
- Height: 1.78 m (5 ft 10 in)
- Position: Defender

Youth career
- Diamond United
- 2000–2001: Civics

Senior career*
Years	Team	Apps	(Gls)
2001–2014	Civics		

International career
2003–2008	Namibia	20	(0)
- * Club domestic league appearances and goals

Franklin April (18 April 1984 – 18 October 2015) was a Namibian football defender who played for FC Civics and the Namibia national football team.

== Club career ==
Nicknamed Piele, April was born in Khomasdal, Windhoek, and started playing football as a striker and he was called up for the national Olympic team in 2000. He was spotted and subsequently signed by Civics, winning three back-to-back Premiership titles with the club between 2005 and 2007. He remained at the club for the entirety of his career, retiring after the 2013/14 season.

== International career ==
He was a part of the Namibia squad at the 2008 African Cup of Nations and earned 20 caps, scoring no goals.

== Personal life ==
April died from an asthma attack in October 2015. He was survived by his fiancée Blanche Wimmert and three daughters. He was self-empoyed and worked in the retail business.

== Honours ==
Civics

- Namibia Premier Football League: 2005, 2006, 2007
- NFA Cup: 2003, 2008
