= Gottlieb Nakuta =

Namibian footballer (born 1988)

Gotllieb Nakuta (born 8 May 1988) is a Namibian football (soccer) defender with Blue Waters F.C. and the Namibia national football team. He has 14 caps for Namibia and was on the squad which appeared at the 2008 Africa Cup of Nations, though he did not appear. He made his debut with Namibia in 2006 in a friendly against Zimbabwe.
