= Noël Séka =

Beninese footballer

Personal information
- Date of birth: 3 September 1984 (age 42)
- Place of birth: Allahe, Benin
- Height: 1.84 m (6 ft 0 in)
- Position: Central defender

Senior career*
Years	Team	Apps	(Gls)
2004	Requins		
2004–2005	US Créteil-Lusitanos	1	(0)
2005–2009	FC Fyn	35	(3)
2009–2011	Al-Nasr		
Total		36	(3)

International career
2004–2008	Benin	13	(0)
- * Club domestic league appearances and goals

Noël Séka (born 3 September 1984) is a Beninese former professional footballer who played as a central defender.

== Career ==
Born in Allahe, Benin, Séka played club football for Requins, US Créteil-Lusitanos, FC Fyn and Al-Nasr.

He earned 12 caps for the Benin national team.
