= Wycliffe, Modesto, California =

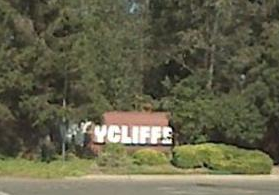

Wycliffe is a neighborhood in east Modesto, California. It is located on Wycliffe Drive: north of the Dry Creek and south of Scenic Drive. Wycliffe is situated in the 95355 zip code of Modesto that encompasses a population of approximately 49,379 residents. Some of the homes in the neighborhoods are enclaved in the cliffs of the nearby stream, across the stream the McClure Country Place and Dry Creek Regional Park and bike/walk trail are located.
