= Abraham Shatimuene =

Namibian footballer

Personal information
- Full name: Abraham Letu Shatimuene
- Date of birth: 2 April 1986 (age 40)
- Place of birth: Windhoek, South West Africa
- Height: 6 ft 0 in (1.83 m)
- Position: Attacking midfielder

Team information
- Current team: United Africa Tigers
- Number: 10

Youth career
- 1995–1996: SK Windhoek
- 1997–2003: United Africa Tigers

Senior career*
Years	Team	Apps	(Gls)
2003–2006	United Africa Tigers	21	(3)
2007–2009	1º de Agosto	49	(2)
2010	CD Huila	9	(0)
2011–	United Africa Tigers		

International career
2006–2008	Namibia	14	(1)
- * Club domestic league appearances and goals

Abraham Letu Shatimuene (born 2 April 1986 in Windhoek) is a Namibian footballer, who currently plays for United Africa Tigers.

== Career ==
On 1 July 2007, Shatimuene left United Africa Tigers to sign for Angolan side Primeiro de Agosto.

== International career ==
He competed for Namibia at the 2008 Africa Cup of Nations.
