= Tiassé Koné =

Ivorian footballer

Personal information
- Full name: Tiassé Koné
- Date of birth: 11 October 1981 (age 45)
- Place of birth: Touba, Ivory Coast
- Height: 1.85 m (6 ft 1 in)
- Position: Goalkeeper

Team information
- Current team: ASEC Mimosas

Senior career*
Years	Team	Apps	(Gls)
2004–2007	Africa Sports	?	(0)
2008	Spartak Nalchik	0	(0)
2008	UR Namur	1	(0)
2009	Africa Sports	7	(0)
2010–2011	Issia Wazy	22	(1)
2012	ASEC Mimosas		

International career
2008	Ivory Coast	1	(0)
- * Club domestic league appearances and goals

Tiassé Koné (born 11 October 1981) is a former Ivorian international footballer, who played as a goalkeeper.

== Career ==
Koné was born in Touba, Ivory Coast. In 2007, he won the Ivory Coast Premier Division with Africa Sports for the first time since 1999. In January 2008, he made the step to Spartak Nalchik. After six months in Russia, he moved to Belgian Second Division team UR Namur in July 2008, where he played until November. Being unable to find his way into the starting eleven, he then was released from his contract. For the 2009 season, he went back to his home squad Africa Sports, where he had to compete with young keeper Okoua for the role as main keeper. In 2010, he left Africa Sports to join Issia Wazy.

== International career ==
He was called up to the Ivory Coast national football team for the 2008 Africa Cup of Nations, being the only locally based player in the Ivorian squad.
