= Samuel Johnson (footballer, born 1984) =

Guinean footballer

Personal information
- Date of birth: 25 January 1984 (age 42)
- Place of birth: Guinea
- Height: 1.78 m (5 ft 10 in)
- Position: Midfielder

Team information
- Current team: El Geish

Senior career*
Years	Team	Apps	(Gls)
2004–2005	Baladeyet Al-Mahalla	26	(1)
2006–2008	Ismaily SC	13	(0)
2009	Kazma (loan)	14	(0)
2009–2010	El Geish	21	(5)

International career
2005–2009	Guinea	7	(0)
- * Club domestic league appearances and goals

Samuel Johnson (born 25 January 1984) is a Guinean footballer.

== Career ==
Johnson played from 2004 to 2010 in Egypt for Baladeyet Al-Mahalla, Ismaily SC and El Geish. He also was a half year 2009 on loan in Kuwait by Kazma Sporting Club.

== International career ==
Johnson was one of the twenty-three (23) players of the Syli National ("National Elephant") who participated at the 2008 26th African Nations Cup (CAN) in Ghana, West Africa, where the National Elephant reached the quarter final for the third consecutive time in six (6) years (2004 in Tunisia, 2006 in Egypt, and 2008 in Ghana).
