= Hamouda Bashir =

Sudanese football midfielder

Personal information
- Full name: Hamouda Bashir Mohamed Jameel
- Date of birth: 3 January 1984 (age 42)
- Place of birth: Sennar, Sinnar State, Sudan
- Position: Midfielder

Senior career*
| Years | Team | Apps | (Gls) |
| 2000 | Al-Aamil SC (Sennar) | | |
| 2001–2004 | Al-Merrikh SC | | |
| 2005–2011 | Al-Hilal Club | | |
| 2011–2015 | Al-Ahly Shendi | | |
| 2015–2017 | Al-Hilal SC (Al-Ubayyid) | | |
| 2017 | Al-Ahly Shendi | | |
| 2018 | Wad Hashim SC (Sennar) | | |

International career
| 2003–2013 | Sudan | 48 | (0) |
Medal record
Men's football
Representing Sudan
CECAFA Cup
| Winner | 2006 Ethiopia |
| Runner-up | 2013 Kenya |
- * Club domestic league appearances and goals

Hamouda Bashir (born 3 January 1984) is a Sudanese former footballer who played as a midfielder. He was a member of the Sudan national football team.

== Honours ==
Sudan

- CECAFA Cup: 2006; runner-up, 2013
