= Mike Poto =

Zambian footballer (born 1981)

Personal information
- Full name: Michael Poto
- Date of birth: 15 January 1981 (age 45)
- Place of birth: Mufulira, Zambia
- Position: Goalkeeper

Team information
- Current team: Green Buffaloes FC
- Number: 16

Senior career*
Years	Team	Apps	(Gls)
2007–2015	Green Buffaloes FC	?	(?)

International career
2007-2008	Zambia	2	(0)
- * Club domestic league appearances and goals as of May 1, 2007

Mike Poto (born 15 January 1981) is a Zambian former football goalkeeper who played for Green Buffaloes in Zambia. He has played for the Zambia national team.
