= Alsény Camara (footballer, born 1986) =

Guinean footballer

Personal information
- Date of birth: November 4, 1986 (age 40)
- Place of birth: Conakry, Guinea
- Height: 1.85 m (6 ft 1 in)
- Position: Defender

Senior career*
Years	Team	Apps	(Gls)
2004–2005	Friguiagbé FC	24	(3)
2005–2008	Toulouse B	40	(0)
2007–2008	→ Rodez AF (loan)	25	(2)
2008–2009	LB Châteauroux	12	(0)
2009–2010	Châteauroux B	11	(0)
2010–2013	Vendée Poiré sur Vie	22	(0)
2013–2015	Rodez AF	42	(2)
2016	Avoine	11	(0)
2016–2017	Oissel	26	(1)
2017–2018	CS Louhans-Cuiseaux	7	(0)
2018–2022	AS La Châtaigneraie	45	(0)

International career
2006–2009	Guinea	14	(0)
- * Club domestic league appearances and goals

Alsény Camara (born 4 November 1986) is a Guinean former footballer who played as a defender.

== Career ==
Born in Conakry, Camara moved to France as a football trainee for Toulouse FC at age 17. He never appeared for Toulouse's senior side, and after a brief loan spell at Rodez, Camara transferred to LB Châteauroux in the Ligue 2, where he would play sparingly before going without a club for six months.
