= Wycliff Kambonde =

Namibian footballer

Wycliff Mathou Kambonde (born 10 January 1988) is a Namibian football midfielder with the Jomo Cosmos of the Premier Soccer League in South Africa.

He previously played for Blue Waters in Namibia.

Kambonde played for the Namibia national football team at the 2008 Africa Cup of Nations, where he appeared in one match.
