= Sosthène Soglo =

Beninese footballer (born 1986)

Personal information
- Date of birth: 3 July 1986 (age 40)
- Place of birth: Cotonou, Benin
- Height: 1.84 m (6 ft 0 in)
- Position: Midfielder

Youth career
- 2000–2003: Requins

Senior career*
Years	Team	Apps	(Gls)
2004	Requins		
2005	Panthères FC		
2006–2010	Energie Sports FC		

International career
2007	Benin U23	4	(0)
2007–2008	Benin	2	(0)
- * Club domestic league appearances and goals

Sosthène Soglo (born 3 July 1986) is a Beninese former footballer who played as a midfielder.

== International career ==
Soglo represented the Benin national team at 2007 UEMOA Tournament in Burkina Faso. He played his debut for the Benin on 21 August 2007 in a friendly match against Gabon in France and played his second game in the Qualification for the 2008 Africa Cup of Nations.
