= Ephraim Tjihonge =

Namibian footballer

Ephraim Tjihonge (born 23 May 1986) is a Namibian football goalkeeper who currently plays for South African National First Division club Milano United.

He previously played for South African clubs African Warriors and Black Leopards. In Namibia he played for SK Windhoek, Civics FC and Black Africa.

He was a part of the Namibian squad at the 2008 African Cup of Nations. He also represented Namibia in a March 2011 friendly against Botswana.
