= Willy Chinyama =

Zambian footballer (born 1984)

Personal information
- Full name: William Chinyama
- Date of birth: 18 April 1984 (age 42)
- Place of birth: Lusaka, Zambia
- Height: 1.75 m (5 ft 9 in)
- Position: Defender

Youth career
- GVM soccer academy

Senior career*
Years	Team	Apps	(Gls)
2003-2006	Forest Rangers		
2007-2011	ZESCO United		
2012-2013	Lime Hotspurs		

International career
2007-2008	Zambia MNT	14	(0)
- * Club domestic league appearances and goals

William Chinyama (born 18 April 1984) is a Zambian defender with ZESCO United F.C. in Zambia. He has 3 international caps for Zambia.

== Career ==
Chinyama is a product of the GVM soccer academy which was founded by 1997 COSAFA Castle Cup, winning coach, the late George Mungwa. But it was at FAZ Division one side Forest Rangers that he started to realize his potential.

With ZESCO United, Chinyama started slowly but as season progressed he grew in stature and he earned a call up to the national team in 2007.

The right footed defender made his international debut in the Ghana 2008 African Cup of nations qualifiers in 1–1 draw against Chad at Chililabombwe's Konkola Stadium. His impressive display at left full back won him praise from many soccer pundits and fans. The Lusaka born was dropped from the starting XI in the final match against South Africa as long serving Joseph Musonda was preferred.

Learned from full backs; Clive Hachilensa and Musonda

In 2007, Chinyama helped ZESCO united win a domestic treble as they won the KCM/FAZ Premier League title, Coca-Cola Cup and inaugural Barclays Cup. 'Team Ya Ziko' also won the season opener; the Samuel 'Zoom' Ndhlovu Charity shield and lost to Red Arrows in the MOSI cup final.

== Honours ==
ZESCO United

- Champions
  - Zambia Super League: 2007
  - Barclays Cup: 2007
  - Zambian Charity Shield: 2007
