= Wissam El Bekri =

Association footballer (born 1984)

Personal information
- Date of birth: 16 June 1984 (age 42)
- Place of birth: Thiais, France
- Height: 1.79 m (5 ft 10 in)
- Position: Left-back

Youth career
- 2000–2003: Châteauroux

Senior career*
| Years | Team | Apps | (Gls) |
| 2003–2005 | Châteauroux | 18 | (0) |
| 2005–2009 | ES Tunis | 64 | (0) |
| 2009–2010 | Dijon | 5 | (0) |
| 2011 | CS Hammam-Lif | 8 | (0) |
| Total | | 95 | (0) |

International career
| 2005–2008 | Tunisia | 13 | (0) |
- * Club domestic league appearances and goals

Wissam El Bekri (born 16 June 1984) is a former professional footballer who played as a left-back. Born in France, he represented Tunisia at international level.
