= Billy Mwanza =

Zambian footballer (born 1983)

Personal information
- Full name: Billy Mwanza
- Date of birth: 21 January 1983 (age 43)
- Place of birth: Chililabombwe, Zambia
- Height: 1.76 m (5 ft 9 in)
- Position: Defender

Senior career*
Years	Team	Apps	(Gls)
2002–2005	Power Dynamos	55	(1)
2006–2008	Golden Arrows	43	(1)
2008	African Warriors	1	(0)
2009	Changsha Ginde	22	(0)
2010–2012	Zesco United		
2012–2014	Nkana		

International career
2004–2010	Zambia	43	(0)
- * Club domestic league appearances and goals

Billy Mwanza (born 21 January 1983) is a Zambian former footballer who played as a defender.
