= Mohamed Sakho =

Guinean footballer

Personal information
- Full name: Mohamed Sakho
- Date of birth: August 5, 1988 (age 38)
- Place of birth: Conakry, Guinea
- Height: 1.71 m (5 ft 7 in)
- Position: Midfielder

Team information
- Current team: Olympique Safi
- Number: 13

Youth career
- Lionceaux de Matam

Senior career*
Years	Team	Apps	(Gls)
2004–2006	Horoya AC	40	(10)
2006–2007	Hafia FC	17	(5)
2007–2009	ES Sahel	55	(13)
2009–2010	Olympique Béja	13	(0)
2010–2011	AS Gabès	24	(2)
2011–2013	Denizlispor	19	(0)
2013–	Olympique Safi	16	(0)

International career^{‡}
2007–	Guinea	22	(0)
- * Club domestic league appearances and goals as of 1 April 2014 ‡ National team caps and goals as of 31 October 2013

Mohamed Sakho (born 5 August 1988 in Conakry), is a Guinean footballer, who currently plays for the Moroccan side Olympique Safi.

== Career ==
At the end of 2007, Mohamed Sakho played for Étoile du Sahel at the World Club Championship in Japan, having won the CAF Champions League and the Tunisian league title. Additionally, Sacko won the bronze medal at the World Club Championship in Japan and subsequently won the CAF Super Cup with Etoile Sportive du Sahel at the end of February 2008 and signed in July 2009 for Olympique Beja.

== International career ==
Sacko was one of the twenty-three players of the Syli National ("National Elephant") who participated at the 2008 26th African Nations Cup (CAN) tournament in Ghana, West Africa, where the National Elephant reached the quarter-final for the third consecutive time in six years (2004 in Tunisia, 2006 in Egypt, and 2008 in Ghana). Along with Mohamed Dioulde Bah of Strasbourg football club (a French 1st Division team), Sacko was one of the young Syli National players that impressed at the 2008 CAN.

Sacko was one of several players who featured in all four matches played by the National Elephant at the 2008 CAN.
