= Kalililo Kakonje =

Zambian footballer (born 1985)

Personal information
- Date of birth: 1 June 1985 (age 41)
- Place of birth: Lusaka, Zambia
- Height: 1.80 m (5 ft 11 in)
- Position: Goalkeeper

Senior career*
Years	Team	Apps	(Gls)
2003	Lusaka Dynamos		
2004–2005	Power Dynamos		
2005–2007	Golden Arrows	14	(0)
2007–2008	Nathi Lions	6	(0)
2007–2010	AmaZulu	46	(0)
2010	Nkana		
2011	TP Mazembe		
2011	Mining Rangers		
2012–2013	NAPSA Stars		

International career
2004–2012	Zambia	19	(0)
- * Club domestic league appearances and goals

Kalililo Kakonje (born 1 June 1985 in Lusaka) is a Zambian former professional footballer who played as a goalkeeper. He serves as goalkeeper coach for Red Arrows FC in Zambia.

== International career ==
Kakonje played for the Zambia national team since 2004.

== Honours ==
Zambia

- Africa Cup of Nations: 2012
