= Janvier Charles Mbarga =

Cameroonian footballer (born 1985)

Janvier Mbarga
Personal information
- Full name: Janvier Charles Mbarga
- Date of birth: September 27, 1985 (age 41)
- Place of birth: Yaoundé, Cameroon
- Height: 1.85 m (6 ft 1 in)
- Position: Goalkeeper

Senior career*
Years	Team	Apps	(Gls)
2007–2009	Canon Yaoundé		
2009	FC Botosani		
2009–2010	Cotonsport Garoua		
2010–2011	Union Douala		
2011–2013	Salalah SC		
2013–2014	Apejes De Mfou		

International career
2007	Cameroon	0	(0)
- * Club domestic league appearances and goals as of 22 December 2007

Janvier Charles Mbarga (born September 27, 1985 in Yaoundé, Cameroon) is a professional Cameroonian footballer who plays as goalkeeper.

== Career ==
Mbarga began his career with Canon Yaoundé and was 2007 promoted to the senior team, in September 2009 signed for Cotonsport Garoua.
