= 2018 Zambia Super League =

57th Zambian top-flight league season

Zambia Super League
- Dates: 11 March 2018 – 28 October 2018
- Champions: ZESCO United (7th title)
- Relegated: National Assembly; Nchanga Rangers; Kabwe YSA; New Monze Swallows
- CAF Champions League: ZESCO United; Nkana
- CAF Confederation Cup: Green Buffaloes; Green Eagles
- Matches: 380
- Goals: 422 (1.11 per match)
- Top goalscorer: Idris Mbombo (Nkana) (20 goals)

The 2018 Zambia Super League, known as the MTN/FAZ Super Division for sponsorship purposes, was the 57th season of the top-tier association football league in Zambia which ran from 17 March to 28 October 2018. ZESCO United claimed their 7th league title and thus retained it having won it the previous season.

== Standings ==
Pos	Team	Pld	W	D	L	GF	GA	GD	Pts	Qualification or relegation
1	ZESCO United (C)	38	24	8	6	53	22	+31	80	Qualification for the 2018–19 CAF Champions League
2	Nkana	38	22	10	6	66	27	+39	76	Qualification for the 2018–19 CAF Champions League
3	Green Buffaloes	38	21	11	6	39	19	+20	74	Qualification for the 2018–19 CAF Confederation Cup
4	Green Eagles	38	20	11	7	52	29	+23	71	Qualification for the 2018–19 CAF Confederation Cup
5	Zanaco	38	21	4	13	53	40	+13	67	
6	Power Dynamos	38	17	11	10	48	33	+15	62	
7	Kabwe Warriors	38	15	13	10	31	27	+4	58	
8	Buildcon	38	16	8	14	44	37	+7	56	
9	Red Arrows	38	13	14	11	34	31	+3	53	
10	Nkwazi	38	12	15	11	31	29	+2	51	
11	Lusaka Dynamos	38	15	6	17	47	48	−1	51	
12	Forest Rangers	38	14	9	15	38	39	−1	51	
13	Kitwe United	38	11	13	14	36	37	−1	46	
14	NAPSA Stars	38	10	15	13	29	30	−1	45	
15	Nakambala Leopards	38	12	7	19	18	32	−14	43	
16	Lumwana Radiants	38	9	14	15	24	40	−16	41	
17	National Assembly (R)	38	9	12	17	38	55	−17	39	Relegation to Zambian Division One
18	Kabwe YSA (R)	38	5	12	21	28	59	−31	27	Relegation to Zambian Division One
19	Nchanga Rangers (R)	38	6	8	24	16	47	−31	26	Relegation to Zambian Division One
20	New Monze Swallows (R)	38	3	9	26	16	60	−44	18	Relegation to Zambian Division One

Source: Bari91.com
Rules for classification: 1) points; 2) goal difference; 3) goals scored; 4) head-to-head points; 5) head-to-head goal difference
(C) Champions; (R) Relegated

== Top scorers ==
No.	NAME	TEAM	GS
1	Idris Mbombo	Nkana FC	20
2	Tapson Kaseba	Green Eagles	19
3	Jesse Were	Zesco United	17
4	Chris Mugalu	Lusaka Dynamos	14
5	Rahim Osumanu	Buildcon	13
6	Lazarous Kambole	Zesco United	11
6	Peter Mwangali	National Assembly	11
6	Alex NGONGA	Power Dynamos	11
9	Walter Bwalya	Nkana FC	10
9	Emmanuel Chabula	Kitwe United	10
9	Ronald KAMPAMBA	Nkana FC	10
9	Anos Tembo	Green Eagles	10
13	George Chaloba	National Assembly	9
13	Ernest MBEWE	Zanaco	9
15	Diamond Chikwekwe	Green Buffaloes	8

Source: FIFA.com
