= 2019 Zambia Super League =

2019 season of the top-tier football league in Zambia

Zambia Super League
- Season: 2019
- Matches: 28
- Goals: 58 (2.07 per match)
- Top goalscorer: Laudit Mavugo Austin Muwowo Zikuru Adams (10 goals each)
- Biggest home win: Zanaco 4-1 Red Arrows (27 January 2019)
- Biggest away win: Lusaka Dynamos 2-5 Zanaco; 3 February 2019
- Highest scoring: Lusaka Dynamos 2-5 Zanaco; 3 February 2019; Zanaco 4-1 Red Arrows (27 January 2019)
- Longest winning run: 3 matches Zanaco
- Longest winless run: 3 matches Kitwe United
- Longest losing run: 3 matches Kitwe United
- All statistics correct as of 11 February 2019.

The 2019 Zambia Super League is the 58th season of the Zambia Super League, the top-tier football league in Zambia. Due to the transitional calendar of the CAF competitions in 2018–19, the 20 teams in the league will be divided into two groups of ten teams stream A and stream B, one of teams from the north and one of teams from the south, Nkana leading one and Zesco United heading the other. The teams top two with the most points will qualify for the CAF Champions League then the other two will play the CAF Confederations Cup. The League will return to normal for the 2019–20 season. The league is set to kick off on 27 January, A day after the Charity Shield.

== Teams ==
The season will be contested by 20 teams in two groups, the 16 teams which qualified from the 2018 Zambia Super League and four promoted clubs. After the season, only 18 teams will remain in the Super League. The promoted clubs include Circuit City (debut), Mufulira Wanderers (returning after one season), Real Nakonde (returning after one season) and Manchester United Zambia Academy. National Assembly, Nchanga Rangers, Kabwe YSA and New Monze Swallows were relegated from the 2018 Zambia Super League.

Confirmed promoted teams

- Circuit City
- Mufulira Wanderers
- Maestro United Zambia (name changed from Manchester United Zambia Academy before season started)
- Prison Leopards

=== Prison Leopards' promotion ===
Prison Leopards got promoted to the Super League weeks after the 2018 Division One season came to an end which resulted that Real Nakonde be demoted back to Division one the team that was confirmed to have won promotion earlier at the end of the season with a better goal difference but finished level on points with Prison Leopards. Leopards launched complained against their opponents Tazara Express from matchweek 23 to have ineligible players. The match was forfeited and three points plus a three nil scoreline was awarded to Prison Leopards. Tazara Express was hence fined K5000.

== League restructuring ==
The Super League will adopt a new format starting in August 2019. At the end of the transitional season in June the Super League will have a reduced number to 18 as the Association looks to increase competitiveness.

The start of a new league season in August 2019 will also see the start of the National Division One which will have 18 teams just like the top tier and will be a sponsored league. The two bottom teams from each zone of the transitional Super League will be relegated to the National Division One.

For promotion to the Super League after the end of the transitional season in June the four top teams from the zones will face each other in playoffs with the two winners (top teams) qualifying to the Super League while the other two will drop to the National Division one.

The National Division One will have six teams at this point. To make the total number of teams reach 18 the teams that will finish from 2nd to fourth in each zone will be promoted to the National Division one to make it 18 teams.

== League tables ==
In this transitional season, it will be played in two streams A and B. The Stream winners will play-off for the title, the Stream runners-up qualify for CAF Confederation Cup, two clubs will be relegated from each stream while only two clubs will be promoted as the top-level league is reduced to 18 clubs for 2020 season.

=== Stream A ===
Pos	Team	Pld	W	D	L	GF	GA	GD	Pts	Qualification or relegation
1	ZESCO United	18	9	6	3	35	20	+15	33	Qualification for Championship final and Champions League
2	Zanaco	18	10	3	5	40	28	+12	33	Qualification for Third place match and Confederation Cup
3	Red Arrows	18	9	6	3	25	15	+10	33	
4	Kabwe Warriors	18	7	10	1	22	13	+9	31	
5	Lusaka Dynamos	18	9	7	2	23	15	+8	28 (Note: Lusaka Dynamos had 6 points deducted for failing to pay former players Abdul Latif Mohammed and Sheriff Deen.)	
6	Green Buffaloes	18	4	8	6	16	16	0	20	
7	Mufulira Wanderers	18	4	6	8	15	27	−12	18	
8	Nakambala Leopards	18	4	5	9	12	24	−12	17	
9	Kitwe United	18	2	5	11	14	25	−11	11	Relegation to National Division One
10	Prison Leopards	18	1	6	11	10	29	−19	9	Relegation to National Division One

Source: FAZ
Rules for classification: 1) points; 2) total wins; 3) total goal differential; 4) total goals scored; 5) disciplinary points; 6) away goal differential; 7) away goals scored; 8) home goals scored; 9) home goal differential; 10) coin toss or drawing of lots

=== Stream B ===
Pos	Team	Pld	W	D	L	GF	GA	GD	Pts	Qualification or relegation
1	Green Eagles	18	10	6	2	22	10	+12	36	Qualification for Championship final and Champions League
2	Buildcon	18	8	7	3	21	12	+9	31	Qualification for Third place match and Confederation Cup
3	Nkwazi	18	7	8	3	15	12	+3	29	
4	Forest Rangers	18	7	5	6	27	24	+3	26	
5	NAPSA Stars	18	5	9	4	21	19	+2	24	
6	Power Dynamos	18	6	6	6	19	20	−1	24	
7	Nkana	18	5	8	5	26	27	−1	23	
8	Lumwana Radiants	18	3	7	8	14	19	−5	16	
9	Circuit City	18	4	4	10	17	27	−10	16	Relegation to National Division One
10	Maestro United Zambia	18	2	6	10	8	20	−12	12	Relegation to National Division One

Source: FAZ
Rules for classification: 1) points; 2) total wins; 3) total goal differential; 4) total goals scored; 5) disciplinary points; 6) away goal differential; 7) away goals scored; 8) home goals scored; 9) home goal differential; 10) coin toss or drawing of lots

== Results ==
=== Stream A ===
Home \ Away	GB	KW	KU	LD	MW	NL	PLD	RA	ZAN	ZU
Green Buffaloes	—	1–1				3–0				0–1
Kabwe Warriors		—		1–1						
Kitwe United		1–2	—		2–0					
Lusaka Dynamos				—			1–0		2–5	
Mufulira Wanderers				0–0	—		3–0			
Nakambala Leopards		1–1	1–0			—				
Prison Leopards	0–0		1–1				—			
Red Arrows	1–0				1–1			—		
Zanaco		4–3				1–0		4–1	—	
ZESCO United									0–0	—

Updated to match(es) played on 25 February 2019. Source: soccerway
Legend: Blue = home team win; Yellow = draw; Red = away team win.
For upcoming matches, an "a" indicates there is an article about the rivalry between the two participants.

=== Stream B ===
Home \ Away	BUI	CC	FR	GE	NAP	MUZA	NKA	NKW	PD	LR
Buildcon	—	2–0			1–1					4–1
Circuit City		—	2–1							1–0
Forest Rangers			—	1–0			2–2			1–1
Green Eagles	1–0			—				0–1	2–0	
NAPSA Stars		1–1			—			2–0		
Maestro United Zambia	1–1					—	p-p			
Nkana							—		0–2	
Nkwazi			1–0					—		
Power Dynamos		2–1				2–0		0–1	—	
Lumwana Radiants					0–1		2–2			—

Updated to match(es) played on 27 January 2019. Source: soccerway
Legend: Blue = home team win; Yellow = draw; Red = away team win.
For upcoming matches, an "a" indicates there is an article about the rivalry between the two participants.

== Third place match ==
29 June 2019
12:30

Zanaco	1–3	Buildcon

National Heroes Stadium

== Championship final ==
29 June 2019
15:00

Green Eagles	0–0	ZESCO United
Penalties
	1–3

National Heroes Stadium

== Top scorers ==
Rank	Player	Club	Goals
1	(Burundi) Laudit Mavugo	Napsa Stars	10
1	(Zambia) Austin Muwowo	Forest Rangers	10
1	(Ghana) Zikuru Adams	Forest Rangers	10
4	(Republic of the Congo) Chrispine Mugalu	Lusaka Dynamos	9
5	(Zambia) Rodger Kola	Zanaco	8
5	(Zimbabwe) Rusike Tafadzwa	Zanaco	8
5	(Kenya) Jesse Were	Zesco Utd	8
5	(Zambia) Lazarous Kambole	Zesco Utd	8
