= 2015 Zambia Super League =

Zambia Super League
- Season: 2015
- Dates: 14 March 2015 – 18 November 2015
- Champions: ZESCO United
- Runner up: Zanaco
- Relegated: Konkola Blades; National Assembly
- Champions League: ZESCO United
- Confederation Cup: Zanaco

The 2015 Zambia Super League was the 54th season of the top tier of Zambian football. The season began on 14 March 2015, and finished on 18 November 2015. ZESCO United won the league on 67 points, four points ahead of runners-up Zanaco, with ZESCO United qualifying for the 2016 CAF Champions League and Zanaco qualifying for the 2016 CAF Confederation Cup as a result.

== League table ==
| Pos | Team | Pld | W | D | L | GF | GA | GD | Pts | Qualification or relegation |
|---|---|---|---|---|---|---|---|---|---|---|
| 1 | ZESCO United (C) | 30 | 20 | 7 | 3 | 52 | 24 | +28 | 67 | Qualified for 2016 CAF Champions League |
| 2 | Zanaco | 30 | 18 | 9 | 3 | 49 | 20 | +29 | 63 | Qualified for 2016 CAF Confederation Cup |
| 3 | Power Dynamos | 30 | 17 | 6 | 7 | 36 | 21 | +15 | 57 | |
| 4 | Green Buffaloes | 30 | 14 | 9 | 7 | 32 | 25 | +7 | 51 | |
| 5 | Mufulira Wanderers | 30 | 13 | 7 | 10 | 31 | 32 | −1 | 46 | |
| 6 | Red Arrows | 30 | 10 | 13 | 7 | 30 | 28 | +2 | 43 | |
| 7 | Nkwazi | 30 | 11 | 10 | 9 | 30 | 28 | +2 | 43 | |
| 8 | Nkana | 30 | 11 | 8 | 11 | 30 | 26 | +4 | 41 | |
| 9 | Green Eagles | 30 | 9 | 9 | 12 | 31 | 33 | −2 | 36 | |
| 10 | Forest Rangers | 30 | 11 | 3 | 16 | 20 | 33 | −13 | 36 | |
| 11 | Nchanga Rangers | 30 | 8 | 8 | 14 | 28 | 32 | −4 | 32 | |
| 12 | NAPSA Stars | 30 | 8 | 8 | 14 | 17 | 28 | −11 | 32 | |
| 13 | Nakambala Leopards | 30 | 6 | 13 | 11 | 17 | 23 | −6 | 31 | |
| 14 | Lusaka Dynamos | 30 | 7 | 8 | 15 | 27 | 41 | −14 | 29 | |
| 15 | Konkola Blades (R) | 30 | 6 | 10 | 14 | 25 | 31 | −6 | 28 | Relegated to Zambian Division One |
| 16 | National Assembly (R) | 30 | 5 | 4 | 21 | 20 | 50 | −30 | 19 | Relegated to Zambian Division One |

Source: RSSSF, Soccerway
Rules for classification: 1) points; 2) goal difference; 3) goals scored; 4) head-to-head points; 5) head-to-head goal difference
(C) Champions; (R) Relegated

== Statistics ==
=== Top scorers ===
| Rank | Player | Club | Goals |
|---|---|---|---|
| 1 | Winston Kalengo | ZESCO United | 18 |
| 2 | Fred Tshimanga | Nkana | 11 |
| 3 | Jimmy Ndhlovu | Nkana | 10 |
