= Fackson Kapumbu =

Zambian footballer (born 1990)

Personal information
- Date of birth: 6 October 1990 (age 36)
- Place of birth: Chingola, Zambia
- Height: 1.78 m (5 ft 10 in)
- Position: Left-back

Team information
- Current team: ZESCO United

Senior career*
Years	Team	Apps	(Gls)
2010–2012	National Assembly		
2013–2016	Zanaco		
2017–	ZESCO United		

International career^{‡}
2013–	Zambia	29	(2)
- * Club domestic league appearances and goals as of 19:00, 20 July 2018 (UTC) ‡ National team caps and goals as of 19:00, 20 July 2018 (UTC)

Fackson Kapumbu (born 6 October 1990) is a Zambian international footballer who plays for ZESCO United, as a left-back.

== Club career ==
Kapumbu began his career in 2010 with Lusaka-based side National Assembly, before signing for Zanaco in time for the 2013 Zambian Premier League season. Kapumbu later signed for ZESCO United ahead of the 2017 Zambian Premier League season.

On 1 November 2017, Kapumbu was nominated for the domestic African Footballer of the Year award by the Confederation of African Football.

== International career ==
On 28 April 2013, Kapumbu made his debut for Zambia in a 2–0 win against Zimbabwe. On 16 July 2017, Kapumbu scored his first goal for Zambia in a 4–0 win against Swaziland.

== Personal life ==
Kapumbu is the brother of the Zambian footballer Kelvin Kapumbu, who is also his teammate at Zesco and the national team.

=== International goals ===
Scores and results list Zambia's goal tally first.

#	Date	Venue	Opponent	Score	Result	Competition
1	31 May 2017	Somhlolo National Stadium, Lobamba, Swaziland	Swaziland	4–0	4–0	2018 African Nations Championship qualification
2	14 January 2018	Marrakesh Stadium, Marrakesh, Morocco	Uganda	3–1	3–1	2018 African Nations Championship

== Honours ==
Zanaco

- Zambian Premier League: 2016

ZESCO United

- Zambian Premier League: 2017
