= Kelvin Kapumbu =

Zambian footballer (born 1996)

Personal information
- Date of birth: April 6, 1996 (age 30)
- Place of birth: Lusaka, Zambia
- Height: 1.78 m (5 ft 10 in)
- Position: Defensive midfielder

Team information
- Current team: Hapoel Petah Tikva

Youth career
- Zanaco

Senior career*
Years	Team	Apps	(Gls)
2016–2017	Zanaco		
2017–2019	Lumwana Radiants		
2019–2022	Zanaco		
2022–2024	Zesco United		
2024–	Hapoel Petah Tikva		

International career
2019–	Zambia	30	(0)
- * Club domestic league appearances and goals

Kelvin Kapumbu (born 6 April 1996) is a Zambian professional footballer who plays as a defensive midfielder for Hapoel Petah Tikva and the Zambia national team.

== Career ==
Kapumbu began his senior career with Zanaco in the Zambia Super League in 2016, and after a season moved to Lumwana Radiants for 2 seasons, before returning to Zanaco. On 3 August 2022, he moved to Zesco United on a 2-year contract. He was named player of the season for Zesco United for the 2022–23 season.

== International ==
He debuted with the senior Zambia national team in a 1–0 2020 African Nations Championship qualification win over Eswatini on 22 September 2019. He was part of the Zambia team that won the 2022 COSAFA Cup. He was called up to the national team for the 2023 Africa Cup of Nations.

== Personal life ==
Kapumbu is the brother of the Zambian footballer Fackson Kapumbu, who is also his teammate at Zesco and the national team.

== Honours ==
=== Club ===
Zanaco

- Zambia Super League: 2016

=== International ===
Zambia

- COSAFA Cup: 2022
