= 2019 Kagame Interclub Cup =

CECAFA Kagame Cup

Tournament details
- Host country: Rwanda
- Dates: July 7– 21
- Teams: 16
- Venues: 2 (in 2 host cities)

Final positions
- Champions: (Uganda) KCCA (1st title)
- Runners-up: (Tanzania) Azam
- Third place: (Zambia) Green Eagles
- Fourth place: (Democratic Republic of the Congo) AS Maniema Union

Tournament statistics
- Matches played: 32
- Goals scored: 70 (2.19 per match)

The 2019 Kagame Interclub Cup was the 42nd edition of the Kagame Interclub Cup, a football competition for clubs in East and Central Africa, which is organised by CECAFA. It took place in Rwanda from 7 July to 21 July 2019.

All times shown are in East Africa Time (UTC+3).

== Participants ==
The following 16 clubs took part in the competition:

Group A

- (Democratic Republic of the Congo) TP Mazembe
- (Rwanda) Rayon Sports
- (South Sudan) Atlabara
- (Tanzania) Kinondoni MC

Group B

- (Uganda) KCCA
- (Rwanda) Mukura Victory Sports
- (Tanzania) Azam
- (Kenya) Bandari

Group C

- (Rwanda) A.P.R.
- (Uganda) Proline
- (Somalia) Heegan
- (Zambia) Green Eagles

Group D

- (Kenya) Gor Mahia
- (Zanzibar) KMKM
- (Democratic Republic of the Congo) AS Maniema Union
- (Democratic Republic of the Congo) Motema Pembe (Withdrew from the tournament)
- (Djibouti) AS Port

== Officials ==
Referees

- Hassan Eĺ Hagi (Somalia)
- Jean Claude Ishimwe (Rwanda)
- Nsoro Ruzindana (Rwanda)
- Samwel Uwikunda (Rwanda)
- Israel Mpaima (Kenya)
- Anthony Ogwayo (Kenya)
- William Oloya (Uganda)
- Ali Sabilla (Uganda)
- Elly Ally Sasii (Tanzania)
- Ali Mfaume Nassoro (Zanzibar)
- Mohamed Diraneh Guedi (Djibouti)
- (Democratic Republic of the Congo) Pierre Kibingo (DR Congo)

Assistant Referees

- Bashir Sheikh Suleiman (Somalia)
- Mohamed Nour Abdi (Somalia)
- Ambroise Hakizimana (Rwanda)
- Raymond Nonati Bwiliza (Rwanda)
- Oliver Odhiambo (Kenya)
- Tony Kidiya (Kenya)
- Isa Masembe (Uganda)
- Liban Abdirazack Ahmed (Djibouti)
- Romeo Kasengele (Zambia)
- Gasim Madir Dehiya (South Sudan)
- Frank Komba (Tanzania)
- Ferdinand Chacha (Tanzania)

== Group stage ==
Tie-breaking criteria for group play
The ranking of teams in each group was based on the following criteria:
1. Number of points obtained in games between the teams involved
2. Goal difference in games between the teams involved
3. Goals scored in games between the teams involved
4. Away goals scored in games between the teams involved
5. Goal difference in all games
6. Goals scored in all games
7. Drawing of lots

The group stage featured sixteen teams, with 4 teams in Group A, Group B, Group C, and D. Two teams from Group A and B and Group C and Group D advanced to the knockout stage.

=== Group A ===
Team	Pld	W	D	L	GF	GA	GD	Pts	Qualification
(Rwanda) Rayon Sports	3	2	0	1	3	1	+2	6	Qualified for Quarterfinals
(Democratic Republic of the Congo) TP Mazembe	3	2	0	1	7	2	+5	6	Qualified for Quarterfinals
(Tanzania) Kinondoni MC	3	1	1	1	2	2	0	4	
(South Sudan) Atlabara	3	0	1	2	2	9	−7	1	

7 July 2019
13:00

Kinondoni MC (Tanzania)	1–1	(South Sudan) Atlabara
Aiyee 46'		Sunday 67'

Amahoro Stadium, Kigali
Referee: Mohamed Diraneh Guedi (Djibouti)
7 July 2019
15:30

Rayon Sports (Rwanda)	1–0	(Democratic Republic of the Congo) TP Mazembe
Ulimwengu 3'

Amahoro Stadium, Kigali
Referee: Hassan Eĺ Hagi (Somalia)

9 July 2019
17:00

Kinondoni MC (Tanzania)	0–1	(Democratic Republic of the Congo) TP Mazembe
		Mondeko 61'

Amahoro Stadium, Kigali
Referee: Anthony Ogwayo (Kenya)
9 July 2019
19:00

Atlabara (South Sudan)	0–2	(Rwanda) Rayon Sports
		Ulimwengu 12', 79'

Amahoro Stadium, Kigali
Referee: Elly Ally Sasii (Tanzania)

13 July 2019
15:30

TP Mazembe (Democratic Republic of the Congo)	6–1	(South Sudan) Atlabara
Muleka 3', 52'; Koffi 15'; Likonza 46'; Kalaba 65', 88'		Obeyond 5'

Amahoro Stadium, Kigali
Referee: Ali Mfaume Nassoro (Zanzibar)
13 July 2019
18:00

Rayon Sports (Rwanda)	0–1	(Tanzania) Kinondoni MC
		Kabunda 38'

Amahoro Stadium, Kigali
Referee: Israel Mpaima (Kenya)

=== Group B ===
Team	Pld	W	D	L	GF	GA	GD	Pts	Qualification
(Uganda) KCCA	3	2	1	0	4	2	+2	7	Qualified for Quarterfinals
(Tanzania) Azam	3	1	1	1	1	1	0	4	Qualified for Quarterfinals
(Kenya) Bandari	3	0	3	0	3	3	0	3	
(Rwanda) Mukura Victory Sports	3	0	1	2	3	5	−2	1	

7 July 2019
13:00

Bandari (Kenya)	1–1	(Uganda) KCCA
Hassan 2'	Report	Juma 60'

Stade Huye, Butare
Referee: Ali Mfaume Nassoro (Zanzibar)
7 July 2019
15:30

Azam (Tanzania)	1–0	(Rwanda) Mukura Victory Sports
Selemani 77'

Stade Huye, Butare
Referee: Israel Mpaima (Kenya)

9 July 2019
13:00

Bandari (Kenya)	2–2	(Rwanda) Mukura Victory Sports
Kenga 23'; Muama 90'		Nyirinkindi 83'; Ntwali 83'

Stade Huye, Butare
Referee: Hassan Eĺ Hagi (Somalia)
9 July 2019
15:00

KCCA (Uganda)	1–0	(Tanzania) Azam
Anaku 49'

Stade Huye, Butare
Referee: Mohamed Diraneh Guedi (Djibouti)

12 July 2019
15:30

Azam (Tanzania)	0–0	(Kenya) Bandari

Stade Huye, Butare
Referee: Pierre Kibingo (DR Congo)
12 July 2019
18:00

KCCA (Uganda)	2–1	(Rwanda) Mukura Victory Sports
Mutyaba 6'; Okello 41'		Duhayindavyi 89' (pen.)

Stade Huye, Butare
Referee: Hassan Eĺ Hagi (Somalia)

=== Group C ===
Team	Pld	W	D	L	GF	GA	GD	Pts	Qualification
(Rwanda) A.P.R.	3	3	0	0	6	0	+6	9	Qualified for Quarterfinals
(Zambia) Green Eagles	3	2	0	1	4	2	+2	6	Qualified for Quarterfinals
(Uganda) Proline	3	1	0	2	3	3	0	3	
(Somalia) Heegan	3	0	0	3	0	8	−8	0	

6 July 2019
13:00

Heegan (Somalia)	0–2	(Zambia) Green Eagles
	Report	Musonda 55'; Sautu 34'

Amahoro Stadium, Kigali
Referee: Elly Ally Sasii (Tanzania)
6 July 2019
16:00

A.P.R. (Rwanda)	1–0	(Uganda) Proline
Manzi 90+4'	Report

Amahoro Stadium, Kigali
Referee: Anthony Ogwayo (Kenya)

8 July 2018
13:00

Proline (Uganda)	2–0	(Somalia) Heegan
Okiror 61'; Mujuzi 75' (pen.)	Report

Amahoro Stadium, Kigali
8 July 2018
15:30

Green Eagles (Zambia)	0–1	(Rwanda) A.P.R.
		Sunzu 59' (o.g.)

Amahoro Stadium, Kigali
Referee: Ali Sabilla (Uganda)

11 July 2018
13:30

Proline (Uganda)	1–2	(Zambia) Green Eagles
Kiwanuka 52'		Musonda 13', 47'

Amahoro Stadium, Kigali
Referee: Ali Mfaume Nassoro (Zanzibar)
11 July 2018
15:30

A.P.R. (Rwanda)	4–0	(Somalia) Heegan
Usengimana 1', 3'; Niyomugabo 15'; Mugunga 84'

Amahoro Stadium, Kigali
Referee: Ali Sabilla (Uganda)

=== Group D ===
Team	Pld	W	D	L	GF	GA	GD	Pts	Qualification
(Kenya) Gor Mahia	3	3	0	0	5	1	+4	9	Qualified for Quarterfinals
(Democratic Republic of the Congo) AS Maniema Union	3	2	0	1	5	3	+2	6	Qualified for Quarterfinals
(Djibouti) AS Port	3	1	0	2	3	4	−1	3	
(Zanzibar) KMKM	3	0	0	3	0	5	−5	0	

8 July 2019
14:00

KMKM (Zanzibar)	0–2	(Djibouti) AS Port
		Dadzie 25', 74'

Umuganda Stadium, Gisenyi
Referee: William Oloya (Uganda)
8 July 2019
16:30

Gor Mahia (Kenya)	2–1	(Democratic Republic of the Congo) AS Maniema Union
Ochieng 22'; Omondi 50'		Likwera 82'

Umuganda Stadium, Gisenyi
Referee: Jean Claude Ishimwe (Rwanda)

10 July 2019
13:30

Gor Mahia (Kenya)	2–0	(Djibouti) AS Port
Omondi 70'; Owalo 90+3'

Umuganda Stadium, Gisenyi
Referee: Samwel Uwikunda (Rwanda)
10 July 2019
15:30

KMKM (Zanzibar)	0–2	(Democratic Republic of the Congo) AS Maniema Union
	Report	Likwera 50'; Ali 64' (o.g.)

Umuganda Stadium, Gisenyi
Referee: Nsoro Ruzindana (Rwanda)

14 July 2019
13:30

Gor Mahia (Kenya)	1–0	(Zanzibar) KMKM
Ombija 87'

Umuganda Stadium, Gisenyi
Referee: William Oloya (Uganda)
14 July 2019
15:30

AS Maniema Union (Democratic Republic of the Congo)	2–1	(Djibouti) AS Port
Kilangalanga 10'; Lutonadio 13'		Dadzie 71'

Umuganda Stadium, Gisenyi
Referee: Jean Claude Ishimwe (Rwanda)

== Quarterfinals ==
16 July 2019
17:00

TP Mazembe (Democratic Republic of the Congo)	1–2	(Tanzania) Azam
Ipamy 21'		Selemani 27'; Chirwa 69'

Amahoro Stadium, Kigali
Referee: Jean Claude Ishimwe (Rwanda)
16 July 2019
19:30

KCCA (Uganda)	2–1	(Rwanda) Rayon Sports
Kizza 33'; Nunda 66'		Rugwiro 48'

Amahoro Stadium, Kigali
Referee: Hassan Eĺ Hagi (Somalia)
17 July 2019
17:00

Gor Mahia (Kenya)	1–2	(Zambia) Green Eagles
Kipkirui 2'		Kaseba 8'; Mulungwe 69'

Amahoro Stadium, Kigali
Referee: Mohamed Diraneh Guedi (Djibouti)
17 July 2019
19:30

APR (Rwanda)	0–0 (a.e.t.)	(Democratic Republic of the Congo) AS Maniema Union
Penalties
	3–4

Amahoro Stadium, Kigali
Referee: Anthony Ogwayo (Kenya)

== Semifinals ==
19 July 2019
16:00

KCCA (Uganda)	4–3 (a.e.t.)	(Zambia) Green Eagles
Okello 2', 76'; Mutyaba 98'; Anaku 101'		Shamende 32', 52'; Chola 119'

Amahoro Stadium, Kigali
Referee: Israel Mpaima (Kenya)
17 July 2019
19:00

Azam (Tanzania)	0–0 (a.e.t.)	(Democratic Republic of the Congo) AS Maniema Union
Penalties
	5–4

Amahoro Stadium, Kigali
Referee: Hassan Eĺ Hagi (Somalia)

== Third place ==
21 July 2019
15:00

AS Maniema Union (Democratic Republic of the Congo)	0–2	(Zambia) Green Eagles
		Mwamba 28'; Shamende 69'

Amahoro Stadium, Kigali
Referee: Ali Sabilla (Uganda)

== Final ==
21 July 2019
18:00

Azam (Tanzania)	0–1	(Uganda) KCCA
		Kizza 62'

Amahoro Stadium, Kigali
Referee: Jean Claude Ishimwe (Rwanda)

== Top scorers ==
1 goal

- (Burundi) Jules Ulimwengu
- (Kenya) Hassan Abdallah
- (Rwanda) Thierry Manzi
- (Uganda) Ibrahim Juma
- (Zambia) Kennedy Musonda
- (Zambia) Spencer Sautu
