= Isaac Chansa =

Zambian footballer (born 1984)

Personal information
- Full name: Isaac Chansa
- Date of birth: 23 March 1984 (age 42)
- Place of birth: Mansa Luapula Province, Zambia
- Height: 1.70 m (5 ft 7 in)
- Position: Midfielder

Team information
- Current team: Forest Rangers

Senior career*
Years	Team	Apps	(Gls)
–2002	Chambishi		
2002–2004	Power Dynamos	45	(16)
2004–2007	Orlando Pirates	43	(7)
2007–2009	Helsingborgs IF	40	(4)
2010–2012	Orlando Pirates	44	(12)
2012	Henan Jianye	16	(2)
2013–2014	Zanaco	25	(5)
2014–2015	Shillong Lajong	0	(0)
2014	→ NorthEast United FC (loan)	8	(0)
2015–2017	Zanaco		(8)
2017–2019	Zakho	5	(0)
2019–	Forest Rangers		

International career^{‡}
2004–2016	Zambia	69	(3)
Medal record
Men's football
Representing Zambia
Africa Cup of Nations
Winner	2012 Equatorial Guinea-Gabon
- * Club domestic league appearances and goals as of 08:54, 19 August 2020 (UTC) ‡ National team caps and goals as of 08:54, 19 August 2020 (UTC)

Isaac Chansa (born 23 March 1984), popularly known as "Zife", is a Zambian professional footballer who plays as a midfielder for Forest Rangers in the Zambia Super League.

== Club career ==
=== Chambishi and Power Dynamos ===
Chansa was born in Kitwe and began his professional club career at Chambishi, but he didn't find his place in the first squad and later moved to Power Dynamos. With Dynamos, he appeared in 45 league matches, scoring 16 goals between 2002 and 2004. He was in Dynamos' 2003 Zambian Cup, 2003 Zambian Coca-Cola Cup and 2004 Zambian Charity Shield winning squad. He has also appeared in 2002 African Cup Winners' Cup.

=== Orlando Pirates ===
From 2004 to 2007, he moved to South Africa and played for Premier Soccer League side Orlando Pirates, where he scored 7 goals in 43 league matches. He was in Pirates' Premier Soccer League 2004–05 and 2005–06 Runners-up squad. With Pirates, he won the friendly tournament Vodacom Challenge in 2005.

In 2020, the then Orlando manager Milutin Sredojevic, identified Chansa as one of the best players he has ever coached, thanks to the player's discipline and general personality.

=== Helsingborgs ===
He later joined Swedish Superettan team Helsingborgs IF for the 2007–08 season to team up with former South Africa national team coach Stuart Baxter. Chansa played there until 2009. In late 2006, while still playing for Pirates, Chansa was banned by the PSL for three months (nine suspended) after he was found guilty of assaulting an assistant referee during Pirates’ clash against Jomo Cosmos.

With Helsingborgs IF, he appeared in UEFA Cup matches in 2007 and UEFA Europa League qualifying matches in 2009.

=== Second stint with Orlando ===
After the end of his contract in Sweden with Helsingborgs IF, he returned on 1 February 2010 to his former club Orlando Pirates. He signed a pre-contract with Pirates' Soweto rivals Kaizer Chiefs to join the club in July 2012. He played for the team, where he had already used to play earlier, a season and a half and featured in 41 matches, where he scored 12 goals.

He also won the Premier Soccer League title in 2010 with Orlando and he is still considered as Pirates legend.

=== Henan Jianye ===
In June 2012, Orlando Pirates confirmed that he moved to Chinese club Henan Jianye F.C. for a transfer fee of 700,000 US Dollars.

Chansa, who scored a spectacular goal against Golden Arrows at Orlando Stadium to wrap up Pirates' league title on the final day of the season two years ago, joined the Henan Jianye, which is based in Zhengzhou in the province of Henan. The club was promoted to the Chinese Super League in 2006. They finished third in 2009. Chansa joined Zambia teammate and former Jomo Cosmos star Chris Katongo at Henan.

It was not a suitable move for him and after an even more chaotic and the unsatisfying season of Chinese Super League in 2012, the club was relegated to the second division and he came back to Zambia.

=== Zanaco F.C. ===
In 2013, after the end of the Chinese Super League season, Chansa became a free agent after his Chinese club Henan Jianye offloaded him. He then came back to Zambia and hired by Zanaco until he get a new club. It was announced that, Chansa has joined FAZ/MTN Super league defending champions Zanaco as a guest player. He scored 5 goals in 25 Zambia Super League matches from 2013 to 2014.

=== Shillong Lajong ===
On 8 August 2014, it was confirmed that, Indian I-League club Shillong Lajong FC have completed the signing of Zambian International and African Cup of Nations 2012 winner Isaac Chansa as their 3rd foreigner.

On his new contract, Chansa said that "I am happy and look forward to this new challenge. I will do my best to contribute in the team’s success in any way I can and repay the faith shown in me by the team management."

He played only few 2014–15 Indian Federation Cup matches for Lajong and have not appeared in any I-League match.

=== NorthEast United ===
After signing a short-term contract with Shillong Lajong, he loaned out to their affiliated Indian Super League side NorthEast United FC in 2014.

He made his Indian Super League debut on 16 October against giants Atlético de Kolkata in a 2–0 loss match. With the NorthEast, he appeared in 8 league matches.

=== Mitra Kukar ===
In 2015, he moved to Liga 2 (Indonesia) outfit PS Mitra Kukar and appeared in few league matches but lifted the General Sudirman Cup in 2015.

=== Back to Zanaco ===
He returned to Zambia and signed with his previous club Zanaco F.C. for 2 seasons. He played there until 2017 and won the 2016 Zambian Super League.

=== Royal Eagles ===
Chansa after his stint with Zambian champions Zanaco FC, returned to South Africa to reunite with Royal Eagles F.C. coach Kosta Papic. The Serbian manager was at the helm at Pirates during Chansa's first stint with "the Buccaneers" from 2004 to 2007.

"Chansa is already training with the club and has signed but is waiting the issuing of his work permit", Papic told to kickoff.com on 8 March 2017. Eagles were chasing promotion this season and feel the experience of the Zambian midfielder helped them with that target.

== International career ==
Chansa made his senior international debut for Zambia on 1 May 2004 against Zimbabwe in a 1–1 draw match, where he scored a goal. Chansa was part of the Zambian 2006 African Nations Cup team, which finished third in group C in the first round of competition, thus failing to secure qualification for the quarter-finals. Then he also represented his country in numerous FIFA World Cup qualification matches alongside the main rounds of later African Nations Cup.

Chansa's biggest achievement is winning the African Cup of Nations for his country in February 2012, defeating Ivory Coast. He was also part of the 2014 Zambia national team that took on Japan in the Pre-World Cup International Friendly in the USA.

Between 2004 and 2016, he earned 69 international caps, representing Zambia and scoring 3 goals.

== Career statistics ==
=== International goals ===
Scores and results list Zambia's goal tally first.

No	Date	Venue	Opponent	Score	Result	Competition
1.	1 May 2004	Independence Stadium, Lusaka, Zambia	Zimbabwe	1–0	1–1	Friendly
2.	9 February 2011	Mavuso Sports Centre, Manzini, Swaziland	Swaziland	3–0	4–0	Friendly
3.	19 January 2016	Umuganda Stadium, Gisenyi, Rwanda	Zimbabwe	1–0	1–0	2016 African Nations Championship

== Honours ==
Zambia

- Africa Cup of Nations: 2012

Orlando Pirates

- MTN 8 Cuup: 2010
- Premier Soccer League: 2010–11, 2011–12
- Nedbank Cup: 2011–12

Zanaco

- Zambia Super League: 2016

== See also ==
- Zambia international footballers
