= Isaac Shamujompa =

Zambian footballer (born 1994)

Personal information
- Date of birth: 12 October 1994 (age 32)
- Place of birth: Kapiri Mposhi, Zambia
- Height: 1.87 m (6 ft 2 in)
- Position: Center-back

Team information
- Current team: Zanaco

Senior career*
Years	Team	Apps	(Gls)
2013–2014	Nkana F.C.		
2014–2016	Kalulushi Modern Stars		
2016–2018	Nchanga Rangers F.C.		
2018–2021	Buildcon F.C.		
2021–	Zanaco		

International career^{‡}
2017–	Zambia	20	(0)
- * Club domestic league appearances and goals ‡ National team caps and goals as of 20 July 2022

Isaac Shamujompa (born 12 October 1994) is a Zambian footballer who plays as a defender for Zanaco and the Zambia national football team.

== Career ==
=== Zanaco ===
In August 2021, Shamujompa joined Zambia Super League club Zanaco, signing a three-year contract.
