= Young Arrows F.C. =

Zambian football club

- Full name: Young Arrows Football Club
- Ground: Nkoloma Stadium, Lusaka, Zambia
- Capacity: 15,000
- League: Zambian Division One

Young Arrows F.C. is football club from Zambia in Lusaka. They were members of the Zambia Super League and Zambian Division One, and played their home games at Nkoloma Stadium.

The club was promoted from Division Two in 2001, and further from Division One in 2003. After finishing ninth in the 2004 Zambia Super League, a relegation followed in 2005 after the 15th place. Young Arrows won straight re-promotion, and finished 5th, 7th and 16th in the 2007, 2008 and 2009 Zambia Super League respectively.

Notably, Young Arrows led the Super League for a prolonged time in 2008.

== Zambia international players ==
- Steward Chikandiwa
- Owen Kaposa
- Shaft Katuka
- Chiwanki Lyainga
- Judge Mkandawire
- Moffat Mtonga
- Kasongo Mwepya
- Dube Phiri
- Lottie Phiri
- Derrick Shapande
- Whiteson Simwanza
