= David Smallboy Korbah =

Ghanaian footballer

Personal information
- Date of birth: 4 March 1993 (age 33)
- Place of birth: Aflao, Ghana
- Positions: Defender; midfielder

Youth career
- 2006–2007: Black Panthers FC
- 2007–2008: Bayern Babies
- 2009–2008: Future Stars FC
- 2009–2010: Shooting Stars FC
- 2010–2011: Precious Academy

Senior career*
Years	Team	Apps	(Gls)
2011–2012	Heart of Lions	22	(4)
2015–2016	Dreams F.C.	16	(3)
2016–2017	Asante Kotoko	17	(8)
2017–2019	Buildcon F.C	20	(3)

International career^{‡}
2013	Ghana U20	2	(0)
- * Club domestic league appearances and goals as of 12:58, May 4, 2018 (UTC) ‡ National team caps and goals as of September 30, 2013

David Smallboy Korbah (born 4 March 1993) is a Ghanaian footballer who plays as a defender and midfielder. He formerly played professionally for Zambian Premier League team Buildcon F.C. He has represented Ghana U20 in international youth squads.

== Club career ==
On 5 July 2011, Korbah signed his first professional contract by agreeing to a year contract with Premier League side Heart of Lions. In late July 2012, Korbah joined Asante Kotoko. He represented the club in the Ghanaian Premier League and CAF Champions League competition. In summer 2015 he signed a one-year deal with Ghana Premier League club Dreams F.C.

On 22 February 2017, it was announced that Korbah had signed a two-year deal with Zambian Premier League club Buildcon F.C, completing his move from his former club Dreams F.C. and was given the jersey number fifteen.

== International career ==
Korbah was a member of the 23 players selected by Ghana under-20's coach Maxwell Konadu during the 2013 African U-20 Championship qualification against Morocco U-20 for the 2013 African U-20 Championship.
