= Judge Mkandawire =

Zambian footballer (born 1986)

Personal information
- Full name: Elson Judge Mkandawire
- Date of birth: 25 November 1986 (age 39)
- Place of birth: Lusaka, Zambia
- Position: Forward

Senior career*
| Years | Team | Apps | (Gls) |
| 2007–2008 | Young Arrows F.C. | | |
| 2009 | Red Arrows F.C. | | |
| 2010–2013 | Zanaco F.C. | | |
| 2014 | NAPSA Stars F.C. | | |
| 2015–2018 | Nakambala Leopards F.C. | | |

International career
| 2007–2008 | Zambia | 3 | (0) |
- * Club domestic league appearances and goals

Judge Mkandawire (born 25 November 1986) is a retired Zambian football striker.
