= Luka Tembo =

Zambian footballer (born 1989)

Personal information
- Date of birth: 25 September 1989 (age 37)
- Position: Defender

Senior career*
Years	Team	Apps	(Gls)
2007	Lusaka Dynamos		
2008–2010	Zanaco		
2011–2013	Kabwe Warriors		
2014–2016	Nakambala Leopards		
2017–2018	Lusaka Dynamos		
2019	MUZA		

International career
2008	Zambia	1	(0)
- * Club domestic league appearances and goals

Luka Tembo (born 25 September 1989) is a Zambian football defender.
