= 2017 Zambia Super League =

Zambia Super League
- Season: 2017
- Champions: ZESCO United
- Champions League: ZESCO United; Zanaco
- Confederation Cup: Nkana; Green Buffaloes
- Matches: 380

The 2017 Zambia Super League was the 56th season of the Zambian top-tier football league. The season began on 8 April 2017.

== League table ==
| Pos | Team | Pld | W | D | L | GF | GA | GD | Pts | Qualification or relegation |
|---|---|---|---|---|---|---|---|---|---|---|
| 1 | ZESCO United (C) | 38 | 21 | 11 | 6 | 51 | 27 | +24 | 74 | Qualification for 2018 CAF Champions League |
| 2 | Zanaco | 38 | 20 | 13 | 5 | 57 | 28 | +29 | 73 | |
| 3 | Nkana | 38 | 21 | 8 | 9 | 53 | 29 | +24 | 71 | |
| 4 | Green Buffaloes | 38 | 20 | 10 | 8 | 47 | 26 | +21 | 70 | |
| 5 | Lusaka Dynamos | 38 | 17 | 12 | 9 | 44 | 33 | +11 | 63 | |
| 6 | Power Dynamos | 38 | 15 | 17 | 6 | 50 | 30 | +20 | 62 | |
| 7 | NAPSA Stars | 38 | 16 | 10 | 12 | 43 | 34 | +9 | 58 | |
| 8 | Lumwana Radiants | 38 | 15 | 11 | 12 | 39 | 30 | +9 | 56 | |
| 9 | Buildcon | 38 | 14 | 13 | 11 | 33 | 28 | +5 | 55 | |
| 10 | Red Arrows | 38 | 12 | 16 | 10 | 42 | 36 | +6 | 52 | |
| 11 | Forest Rangers | 38 | 13 | 10 | 15 | 37 | 39 | −2 | 49 | |
| 12 | Nkwazi | 38 | 11 | 14 | 13 | 34 | 39 | −5 | 47 | |
| 13 | Green Eagles | 38 | 10 | 14 | 14 | 31 | 36 | −5 | 44 | |
| 14 | Nakambala Leopards | 38 | 8 | 20 | 10 | 24 | 34 | −10 | 44 | |
| 15 | Kabwe Warriors | 38 | 8 | 19 | 11 | 32 | 35 | −3 | 43 | |
| 16 | Nchanga Rangers | 38 | 10 | 13 | 15 | 35 | 45 | −10 | 43 | |
| 17 | Mufulira Wanderers (R) | 38 | 9 | 12 | 17 | 38 | 53 | −15 | 39 | Relegation to Zambian Division One |
| 18 | Konkola Blades (R) | 38 | 6 | 10 | 22 | 24 | 52 | −28 | 28 | Relegation to Zambian Division One |
| 19 | Real Nakonde (R) | 38 | 6 | 10 | 22 | 17 | 53 | −36 | 28 | Relegation to Zambian Division One |
| 20 | City Of Lusaka (R) | 38 | 3 | 7 | 28 | 30 | 73 | −43 | 16 | Relegation to Zambian Division One |

Source: Soccerway
Rules for classification: 1) points; 2) goal difference; 3) goals scored; 4) head-to-head points; 5) head-to-head goal difference.
(C) Champions; (R) Relegated
