= Musamali =

Musamali is a surname. Notable people with the surname include:

- Paul Musamali (born 1994), Ugandan footballer
- Rita Musamali (born 1999), Ugandan cricketer
