= Steward Chikandiwa =

Zambian footballer (born 1984)

Personal information
- Date of birth: 9 September 1984 (age 42)
- Place of birth: Lusaka, Zambia
- Position: Forward

Team information
- Current team: Nakambala Leopards F.C.

Senior career*
Years	Team	Apps	(Gls)
–2004	Young Arrows F.C.		
2004–	Lusaka Celtic F.C.		
2013–2017	Nkwazi F.C.		
2018	Green Buffaloes F.C.		
2019	Nkwazi F.C.		
2019–	Nakambala Leopards F.C.		

International career
2016	Zambia	1	(0)
- * Club domestic league appearances and goals

Steward Chikandiwa (born 9 September 1984) is a Zambian football striker who currently plays for Nakambala Leopards F.C.
