= 2018 Zambian Charity =

2018 Zambian Charity Shield
Nkana	Zesco
4	3
- Date: 10 March 2018
- Venue: Nkoloma Stadium, Lusaka

The 2018 Zambian Charity Shield was a football match between the previous Super League champions Zesco United and the holders of the ABSA Cup, Nkana. Nkana defeated Zesco United 4-3 in a high-scoring final to claim the 2018 Charity Shield title. The match was a repeat of the 2017 Charity Shield final, where Zesco United had defeated Nkana. In the 2018 edition, Nkana's Ronald 'Sate-Sate' Kampamba and Idris Ilunga Mbombo both scored braces to lead their team to victory over the defending champions Zesco United.
