= Mtonga (surname) =

Family name

Mtonga is a surname of Zambian origin. Notable people with the surname include:

- Kondwani Mtonga (born 1986), Zambian footballer
- Moffat Mtonga (born 1983), Zambian footballer
