= Prince Owusu =

Prince Owusu may refer to:

- Prince Owusu (footballer, born January 1997), Ghanaian football forward for CF Montréal.
- Prince Owusu (footballer, born February 1997), Ghanaian football winger for Al-Hedaya.
