= Kabwe Youth Soccer Academy F.C. =

Zambian football club

Kabwe YSA F.C.
- Full name: Kabwe Youth Soccer Academy
- Founded: 2015
- Ground: Godfrey Chitalu Stadium, Kabwe, Zambia
- Capacity: 10000
- Manager: Chewe Mulenga
- League: Zambia Super League
- 2018: 18th
colours	colours

Kabwe Youth Soccer Academy (abbreviated as KYSA) is a Zambian football club based in Kabwe. The club was founded in 2015 and won promotion to the Zambia Super League in the 2018 season and got relegated that very season but after the transition league of 2019, the club won back promoted to the back to the Super League 6 months after the end of the 2019 season.
