= Walter Bwalya =

Congolese footballer (born 1995)

Personal information
- Full name: Walter Binene Sabwa Bwalya
- Date of birth: 5 May 1995 (age 31)
- Place of birth: Lubumbashi, Zaire
- Height: 1.80 m (5 ft 11 in)
- Position: Striker

Youth career
- –2010: Corboux FC

Senior career*
Years	Team	Apps	(Gls)
2010–2011	Corboux FC		
2011–2013	FC Lubumbashi Sport		
2013–2015	Forest Rangers FC		
2015–2019	Nkana FC	69	(31)
2019–2021	El Gouna FC	35	(16)
2021–2023	Al Ahly SC	20	(3)
2021	→ Yeni Malatyaspor (loan)	8	(0)
2022	→ Al-Sailiya SC (loan)	4	(0)
2022–2023	→ Al-Qadsiah FC (loan)	28	(5)
2023	Wydad AC	0	(0)
2024	Al-Nahda Club	13	(6)
2024–2025	JS Kabylie	13	(2)

International career^{‡}
2021–	DR Congo	1	(0)
- * Club domestic league appearances and goals as of 17 August 2025 ‡ National team caps and goals as of 22:00, 11 June 2021 (UTC)

Walter Binene Sabwa Bwalya (born 5 May 1995), commonly called Walter Bwalya, is a Congolese professional footballer who plays as a striker.

== Career ==
On 15 July 2022, Bwalya joined Saudi Arabian club Al-Qadsiah FC, on loan from Al Ahly SC.

In August 2024, Bwalya signed a three-year contract, with JS Kabylie. In August 2025, he left JSK.

== International career ==
Bwalya made his debut for DR Congo national football team, on 11 June 2021, in a friendly against Mali.

== Honours ==
Nkana FC

- ABSA Cup: 2018
- Zambian Charity Shield: 2018

Al Ahly SC

- Egyptian Premier League: 2022–23
- CAF Champions League: 2020–21
- CAF Super Cup: 2021 (May)
- FIFA Club World Cup third-place: 2020

Al-Sailiya SC

- Qatari Stars Cup: 2021–22

Al-Nahda Club

- Sultan Qaboos Cup runner-up: 2023–24

Individual

- Zambia Super League top scorer: 2016
