= Aggrey Chiyangi =

Zambian footballer (born 1964)

Personal information
- Date of birth: 5 June 1964 (age 62)
- Place of birth: Kitwe, Zambia
- Position: Defender

Team information
- Current team: Green Eagles (manager)

Senior career*
Years	Team	Apps	(Gls)
1984–1997	Power Dynamos		

International career
1993–1997	Zambia	28	(1)

Managerial career
- Green Buffaloes
- Power Dynamos
- Lobtrans Gunners
- Chambishi
- 2014–2015: Zanaco
- 2015–2017: Nkana
- 2017–: Green Eagles
- 2019–2020: Zambia (caretaker)
- * Club domestic league appearances and goals

Aggrey Chiyangi (born 5 June 1964) is a Zambian former football player and current manager of Green Eagles.

== Club career ==
Born in Kitwe, Chiyangi attended Kitwe Boys Secondary School, playing for the school team. Upon leaving school, Chiyangi signed for Power Dynamos, playing for the club between 1984 and 1997.

== International career ==
Chiyangi made his debut for Zambia on 23 May 1993, in a 1–0 loss against Malawi. On 11 July 1993, Chiyangi scored his first, and only, goal for Zambia in a 3–0 win against South Africa. In total, Chiyangi made 28 appearances for Zambia, scoring once.

=== International goals ===
Scores and results list Zambia's goal tally first.

#	Date	Venue	Opponent	Score	Result	Competition
1	11 July 1993	Independence Stadium, Lusaka, Zambia	South Africa	1–0	3–0	1994 African Cup of Nations qualification

== Managerial career ==
Following his playing career, Chiyangi moved into management, managing Green Buffaloes, Power Dynamos, Chambishi as well as Botswana Premier League club Lobtrans Gunners. In March 2014, Chiyangi was appointed manager of Zanaco. In 2015, Chiyangi joined Nkana as manager, before his sacking in January 2017. In June 2017, Chiyangi was named manager of Green Eagles. Between 2019 and 2020, Chiyangi was caretaker manager of the Zambia national team.
