= David Nshimirimana =

Burundian footballer

Personal information
- Full name: David Shukuru Nshimirimana
- Date of birth: 2 January 1993 (age 33)
- Place of birth: Bujumbura, Burundi
- Position: Centre-back

Team information
- Current team: Sofapaka

Senior career*
Years	Team	Apps	(Gls)
2013–2015	Flambeau de l'Est		
2015–2017	Vital'O		
2017–2019	Mukura Victory Sports		
2019–2021	Buildcon		
2021–	Sofapaka		

International career^{‡}
2014–	Burundi	30	(0)
- * Club domestic league appearances and goals as of 13:30, 26 April 2020 (UTC) ‡ National team caps and goals as of 13:30, 26 April 2020 (UTC)

David Shukuru Nshimirimana (born 2 January 1993) is a Burundian footballer who plays as a centre back for Kenyan club Sofapaka and the Burundi national team.

== Club career ==
In March 2019, Nshimirimana joined Zambia Super League club Buildcon from Rwandan club Mukura Victory Sports.

== International career ==
Nshimirimana made his international debut in 2014.

Nshimirimana was included in Burundi's squad for the 2019 Africa Cup of Nations, and appeared in Burundi's 1–0 defeat to Nigeria.
