= Idehen =

Idehen is a surname. Notable people with the surname include:

- Duncan Idehen (born 2002), English footballer
- Osas Idehen (born 1990), Nigerian footballer
- Faith Idehen (born 1973), Nigerian sprinter
