= Prince Owusu (footballer, born February 1997) =

Ghanaian footballer

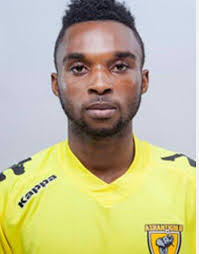

Personal information
- Full name: Prince Kwabena Owusu
- Date of birth: 28 April 1997 (age 29)
- Place of birth: Kumasi, Ghana
- Height: 1.74 m (5 ft 9 in)
- Position: Winger

Youth career
- Atoplans FC
- GoldenStars Academy
- Unistar Soccer Academy

Senior career*
Years	Team	Apps	(Gls)
2016	Mpuasuaman United	15	(3)
2017–2018	Ashanti Gold	17	(4)
2018–2019	Bibiani Gold Stars		
2020–2021	KYSA FC		
2021–2022	Trident FC		
2022–2024	Bibiani Gold Stars		
2024–2025	Al-Hedaya		
- * Club domestic league appearances and goals

Prince Kwabena Owusu (born 28 February 1997) is a Ghanaian professional footballer who plays as a winger.

== Early life ==
In 2016, he played with Unistar Soccer Academy.

== Club career ==
Owusu began his senior career with second-tier side Mpuasuaman United.

In 2017, he joined Ghana Premier League club Ashanti Gold. In April 2017, he scored on his club debut. After the 2017 season, there was interest from the Elmina Sharks in signing him, however, he ultimately decided to remain with Ashanti Gold.

In 2018, he joined Bibani Gold Stars.

In 2020, he joined Zambian club KYSA FC.

In August 2021, he joined Zambian Division One side Trident FC. In May 2022, he departed the club.

He later returned to Ghana and played with the Bibabi Gold Stars. In January 2024, he was set to join Asante Kotoko, however, that deal fell through.

On 14 September 2024, Owusu joined Saudi Third Division club Al-Hedaya.

== Career statistics ==
As of 16 July 2020

Club	Season	League			Cup		Continental		Total	
Club	Season	Division	Apps	Goals	Apps	Goals	Apps	Goals	Apps	Goals
Mpuasuaman United	2016–17	Division One League, Ghana	15	3	1	0	—		16	3
Ashanti Gold	2017–18	Ghanaian Premier League	12	4	1	0	—		13	4
Ashanti Gold	2018–19	Ghanaian Premier League	5	0	0	0	—		5	0
Ashanti Gold	Total		17	4	1	0	—		17	4
KYSA FC	2019–20	Zambia Super League	5	0	0	0	—		5	0
Career total			37	7	2	0	—		39	7
