= 2016 Zambia Super League =

Zambia Super League
- Season: 2016
- Champions: Zanaco
- Relegated: Lusaka Tigers; Mufulira Blackpool; Nakambala Leopards
- Champions League: Zanaco
- Matches: 302
- Goals: 597 (1.98 per match)
- Top goalscorer: Walter Bwalya (24 goals)
- Biggest home win: Zanaco 6-0 Mufulira Blackpool (25 June 2016)
- Biggest away win: Lusaka Dynamos 1-6 Zanaco (13 August 2016)
- Highest scoring: Nkana 6-3 Nakambala Leopards (22 October 2016)
- Longest winning run: Zanaco (8)
- Longest unbeaten run: ZESCO United (15)
- Longest winless run: Mufulira Blackpool (33)
- Longest losing run: Mufulira Blackpool (9)
- All statistics correct as of 10 December 2016.

The 2016 Zambia Super League was the 55th season of the Zambian Top League. The season began on 12 March 2016. ZESCO United were the defending champions, coming off their second consecutive title and fifth overall, all in the last nine years. Zanaco won the league, finishing seven points ahead of defending champions ZESCO United.

== Teams locations ==
Locations of the 2016 Zambian Premier League teams

Zambian Premier League expanded from 16 to 18 teams for the 2016 season with two clubs relegated to Division One and four promoted. Konkola Blades and National Assembly were both relegated to Division One after finishing 15th and 16th, respectively, in the 2015 season. Kabwe Warriors, Lumwana Radiants, Lusaka Tigers and Mufulira Blackpool were each promoted from Division One.

== League table ==
Pos	Team	Pld	W	D	L	GF	GA	GD	Pts	Qualification or relegation
1	Zanaco (C)	34	25	6	3	71	16	+55	81	Qualification to 2017 CAF Champions League
2	ZESCO United	34	21	9	4	57	19	+38	72	Qualification to 2017 CAF Confederation Cup
3	Nkana	34	21	7	6	58	31	+27	70	
4	Power Dynamos	34	18	7	9	47	29	+18	61	
5	Green Buffaloes	34	15	8	11	38	32	+6	53	
6	Kabwe Warriors	34	13	11	10	33	28	+5	50	
7	Red Arrows	34	11	13	10	27	30	−3	46	
8	Nkwazi	34	10	15	9	40	39	+1	45	
9	Forest Rangers	34	12	7	15	26	33	−7	43	
10	NAPSA Stars	34	10	12	12	28	30	−2	42	
11	Mufulira Wanderers	34	7	18	9	26	33	−7	39	
12	Nchanga Rangers	34	10	9	15	28	36	−8	39	
13	Green Eagles	34	9	11	14	26	30	−4	38	
14	Lumwana Radiants	34	9	11	14	23	31	−8	38	
15	Lusaka Dynamos	34	9	9	16	28	50	−22	36	Relegation to Zambian Division One
16	Nakambala Leopards (R)	34	8	11	15	24	39	−15	35	Relegation to Zambian Division One
17	Lusaka Tigers (R)	34	5	10	19	18	49	−31	25	Relegation to Zambian Division One
18	Mufulira Blackpool (R)	34	0	12	22	9	52	−43	12	Relegation to Zambian Division One

Source: RSSSF
Rules for classification: 1) points; 2) goal difference; 3) goals scored; 4) head-to-head points; 5) head-to-head goal difference
(C) Champions; (R) Relegated

== Positions by round ==
Leader
Relegation to Elite Two

Team ╲ Round	1	2	3	4	5	6	7	8	9	10	11	12	13	14	15	16	17	18	19	20	21	22	23	24	25	26	27	28	29	30	31	32	33	34
Zanaco	8	4	2	3	5	10	12	4	3	2	3	3	2	2	1	1	1	1	1	1	1	1	1	1	1	1	1	1	1	1	1	1	1	1
ZESCO United	8	14	8	12	15	9	6	2	2	3	2	2	3	3	3	3	6	3	4	4	5	5	5	5	4	4	5	5	4	4	4	4	3	2
Nkana	1	1	1	1	1	1	1	1	1	1	1	1	1	1	2	2	2	2	2	2	2	2	2	2	2	2	2	2	2	2	2	2	2	3
Power Dynamos	1	6	9	13	7	6	4	7	6	5	5	6	4	5	5	4	3	4	3	3	3	3	3	3	3	3	3	3	3	3	3	3	4	4
Green Buffaloes	3	5	6	6	10	11	8	6	4	4	4	5	6	4	4	5	4	5	5	5	4	4	4	4	5	5	4	4	5	5	5	5	5	5
Kabwe Warriors	8	12	12	15	9	13	9	10	11	12	7	10	7	7	8	8	5	6	6	6	6	6	6	6	6	6	7	7	7	7	6	6	6	6
Red Arrows	8	10	11	14	16	11	13	10	9	8	9	8	12	11	13	11	10	10	8	7	7	7	8	8	7	7	6	6	6	6	8	8	7	7
Nkwazi	14	17	16	9	4	5	3	3	5	6	6	4	5	6	7	7	8	9	9	9	10	10	11	11	12	9	9	9	10	10	7	9	9	8
Forest Rangers	6	9	14	8	11	14	16	16	17	11	13	7	9	8	6	6	7	8	10	11	11	12	9	10	11	12	8	8	8	8	9	7	8	9
NAPSA Stars	14	15	15	16	18	17	17	14	15	13	12	16	15	16	15	13	13	15	15	16	16	15	14	14	10	8	10	11	9	9	10	10	10	10
Nchanga Rangers	16	7	10	5	2	4	5	9	7	9	10	11	10	12	10	9	9	7	7	8	9	9	10	9	8	10	11	14	12	12	13	11	11	11
Lumwana Radiants	8	10	5	11	14	8	11	13	13	16	17	17	17	17	16	16	16	17	17	15	15	16	16	16	15	13	14	13	14	14	14	12	12	
Mufulira Wanderers	6	2	4	4	8	7	10	12	12	14	15	13	8	10	11	12	12	11	11	12	12	11	12	12	14	15	15	15	15	15	15	15	13	
Green Eagles	16	18	17	18	13	16	15	15	14	15	16	15	15	13	14	15	15	14	13	13	14	13	13	13	13	14	13	12	13	13	11	13	14	
Nakambala Leopards	8	12	12	7	6	2	2	5	8	7	8	9	11	9	9	10	11	12	12	10	8	8	7	7	9	11	12	10	11	11	12	14	15	
Lusaka Dynamos	3	3	7	10	12	14	14	17	16	17	14	12	14	15	17	17	17	13	14	14	13	14	15	15	16	16	16	16	16	16	16	16	16	
Lusaka Tigers	3	8	3	2	3	3	7	8	10	10	11	14	13	14	12	13	14	16	16	17	17	17	17	17	17	17	17	17	17	17	17	17	17	17
Mufulira Blackpool	16	16	18	17	17	18	18	18	18	18	18	18	18	18	18	18	18	18	18	18	18	18	18	18	18	18	18	18	18	18	18	18	18	18

Updated to match(es) played on 10 December 2016. Source: Soccerway

== Top scorers ==
Rank	Goalscorer	Team	Goals
1	(Zambia) Walter Bwalya	Nkana	24
2	(Kenya) Jesse Were	ZESCO United	16
3	(Zambia) Felix Nyaende	Forest Rangers	11
4	(Zambia) Patson Daka	Power Dynamos	10
4	(Zambia) Roderick Kabwe	Zanaco	10
4	(Democratic Republic of the Congo) Idris Mbombo	ZESCO United	10
4	(Zambia) Fashion Sakala	Zanaco	10
8	(Zambia) Aubrey Funga	Zanaco	9
8	(Zambia) Saith Sakala	Zanaco	11
10	(Zambia) Isaac Chansa	Zanaco	8
10	(Zambia) Stewart Chikandiwa	Nkwazi	8
10	(Zambia) Jacob Phiri	Kabwe Warriors	8

=== Hat-tricks ===
Player	For	Against	Result	Date
Stewart Chikandiwa	Nkwazi	Lumwana Radiants	0-4	7 April 2016
Jesse Were^{4}	ZESCO United	Mufulira Blackpool	5-0	30 April 2016
Justin Shonga^{4}	Nkwazi	Kabwe Warriors	4-1	21 May 2016
Aubrey Funga	Zanaco	Mufulira Blackpool	6-0	25 June 2016
Saith Sakala	Zanaco	Lusaka Tigers	0-4	24 July 2016
Walter Bwalya	Nkana	Nkana	6-3	22 October 2016

^{4} Player scored 4 goals.
