= Cyril Chibwe =

Zambian footballer (born 1993)

Personal information
- Full name: Cyril Mwenya Chibwe
- Date of birth: 17 June 1993 (age 33)
- Place of birth: Rustenburg, South Africa
- Height: 1.80 m (5 ft 11 in)
- Position: Goalkeeper

Senior career*
Years	Team	Apps	(Gls)
2013–2018	Platinum Stars	1	(0)
2014–2015	→ Garankuwa United (loan)	18	(0)
2018–2019	Jomo Cosmos	20	(0)
2019–2021	Polokwane City	27	(0)
2021–2022	Baroka	0	(0)
2022–2024	ZESCO United		
2024–2025	Black Leopards	16	(0)
2025	ZESCO United	0	(0)

International career^{‡}
2019–	Zambia	11	(0)
- * Club domestic league appearances and goals as of 11 November 2022 ‡ National team caps and goals as of 11 November 2022

Cyril Mwenya Chibwe (born 17 June 1993) is a Zambian footballer who plays as a goalkeeper for the Zambia national team. He was most recently at Zambian club ZESCO United, and has previously played in South Africa with Platinum Stars, Garankuwa United, Jomo Cosmos, Polokwane City, Baroka and Black Leopards.

== Club career ==
=== Platinum Stars ===
Chibwe was born on 17 June 1993 in Rustenburg, South Africa, to a Zambian parents. Chibwe's father Paul was also a professional footballer, playing for Nchanga Rangers and Power Dynamos in Zambia and Manning Rangers in South Africa. Three of his four siblings also played the sport. He grew up in Rustenburg, and attended Karlien Primary School and Tlhabane Technical and Commercial High School. He enrolled at Damelin Correspondence College but dropped out after six months to pursue a footballing career.

He joined Rustenburg-based club Platinum Stars after starring in Nedbank Ke Yona, a reality TV series scouting talented amateur footballers to form a team to face the 2012–13 Nedbank Cup winners. He spent the 2014–15 season on loan with Garankuwa United in the National First Division, and was promoted to the Platinum Stars first team in summer 2015. He made one league appearance for the first team, which came during the 2016–17 season.

=== Jomo Cosmos ===
Chibwe joined National First Division club Jomo Cosmos in summer 2018, and played 23 times for the club across the 2018–19 season.

=== Polokwane City ===
On 3 June 2019, Polokwane City signed Chibwe on a three-year deal. Though initially back-up to George Chigova when he signed for the club, he gradually established himself as the club's first-choice goalkeeper. The club were relegated to the National First Division at the end of the 2019–20 season, and following the club's failure to get promoted during the 2020–21 season, Chibwe agreed to terminate his contract in summer 2021. He made 27 league appearances across two seasons at the club.

=== Baroka ===
Following the termination of his contract at Polokwane City, Chibwe signed for Baroka. Upon signing for the club, Chibwe told The Sowetan that Baroka have "two quality goalkeepers" in Elvis Chipezeze and Oscarine Masuluke, "so it is for me to work extra triple harder to start playing". He failed to make a league appearance for the club during the 2021–22 season, and was released by the club in early 2022.

=== ZESCO United ===
In June 2022, Chibwe joined Zambian club ZESCO United on a two-year contract. He suffered a knee injury in October 2022, which kept him out until February 2023. He left the club in summer 2024 after two seasons there.

=== Black Leopards ===
He returned to South Africa in summer 2024, signing for Black Leopards in the National First Division. He made 16 league appearances over the 2024–25 season.

=== Return to ZESCO United ===
In August 2025, he returned to Zambia Super League club ZESCO United, on a two year contract. However, his contract was terminated in December 2025, after failing to play for the club. Chibwe told Kick Off that he was left without a salary and training alone during his time at ZESCO United.

== International career ==
Prior to accepting a call-up to the Zambia national team, Chibwe had never been to Zambia. He accepted a call-up to the Zambia national team in October 2019, and made his senior international debut on 13 October 2019, coming on as an 86th-minute substitute for Sebastian Mwange in a 2-2 friendly draw with Benin. He was part of the Zambia team who won the 2022 COSAFA Cup, making two appearances at the tournament.

== Honours ==
Zambia

- COSAFA Cup: 2022
