= Lottie Phiri =

Zambian footballer (born 1988)

Personal information
- Full name: Lottie Phiri
- Date of birth: 3 November 1988 (age 37)
- Place of birth: Lusaka, Zambia
- Height: 1.70 m (5 ft 7 in)
- Position: Striker

Youth career
- Petauke United

Senior career*
Years	Team	Apps	(Gls)
2007	Young Arrows		
2008–2010	ZESCO United		
2010–2011	Mpumalanga Black Aces	7	(0)
2011	Power Dynamos		
2011–2012	Mpumalanga Black Aces		
2012–2013	ZESCO United		
2014	Power Dynamos		
2015–2017	Green Buffaloes		
2018	NAPSA Stars		

International career^{‡}
2008–2009	Zambia	2	(0)
- * Club domestic league appearances and goals as of 2020 ‡ National team caps and goals as of 2020

Lottie Phiri (born 3 November 1988 in Lusaka) is a Zambian footballer who plays as a striker. He played in the Zambian Premier League, South African Premier Soccer League, and the Zambia national football team.
