= Chambishi Stadium =

Stadium in Chambishi, Zambia

Chambishi Stadium is a multi-use stadium in Chambishi, Zambia. It is currently used mostly for football matches, but also hosts charity and corporate events. The stadium holds 5,000 people.

== Home of Chambishi F.C. ==
Chambishi Stadium serves as the home for Chambishi F.C.

In 2022, disruptive behaviour by Chambishi F.C. fans at the stadium caused the abandonment of a MTN Super League match between Chambishi and Red Arrows F.C. The team was fined K50,000 by the Football Association of Zambia for failure to control their supporters and banned from having home supporters attend for five matches.
