= Garden Park =

Multi-use stadium in Kitwe, Zambia

Coordinates: 12°47′29″S 28°13′11″E

Garden Park is a multi-use stadium in Kitwe, Zambia. It is currently used mostly for football matches and serves as the home for Kitwe United Football Club. The stadium holds 10,000 people.
