= Winston Kalengo =

Zambian footballer (born 1985)

Personal information
- Date of birth: 29 August 1985 (age 41)
- Place of birth: Livingstone, Zambia
- Height: 1.70 m (5 ft 7 in)
- Positions: Forward; winger

Senior career*
| Years | Team | Apps | (Gls) |
| 2004–2011 | Zanaco | | (28) |
| 2011–2012 | ZESCO United | | |
| 2012 | Zanaco | | |
| 2013–2015 | ZESCO United | | |
| 2016–2018 | AC Léopards | 8 | (14) |
| 2018–2022 | ZESCO United | | |

International career
| 2006–2016 | Zambia | 22 | (8) |
- * Club domestic league appearances and goals

Winston Kalengo (born 29 August 1985) is a Zambian former footballer who played as a forward. He played club football for Zanaco and ZESCO United in Zambia, and for AC Léopards in the Republic of Congo, totaling 11 seasons in the Zambia Super LeagueZambia Super League and scoring 103 goals in the process. Kalengo also played 22 times for the Zambia national team, and scored 8 goals for them.

== Club career ==
=== Early career ===
Kalengo was born on 29 August 1985 in Livingstone, the tourist capital of Zambia, in southern Africa.

=== Zanaco FC ===
In 2003 a young striker scored twice for Zanaco as they over came Roan United 2–1 in a Week 13 match first goals for Zanaco in a Week 13 match. That young striker was Winstone Kalengo, and the brace goal were his first goal in the ZSL. Winston went on to score 9 goals in the 2003 season as a young striker with competition from the big name Zanaco strikers of Rotson Kilambe, Edward Kangwa and Cosmas Banda.

In 2004 with increased competition he only scored 4 goals for Zanaco.

He surprisingly he did not get much of a run in 2005 and didn't score a goal though he still ended up a champion as Zanaco ran out winners of the Primera Division de Zambia.

Winstone Kalengo's break out year was in 2006 when he scored 28 goals in all competitions with 16 league goals to become the Primera Division de Zambia top scorer and take Zanaco to another title and also his second straight title.

After that feat Kalengo did not have it that easy as he averaged 5 goals a season between 2007 and 2010. Kalengo still managed to win one more title with Zanaco in 2009.

=== Zesco United FC ===
In 2011 Kalengo joined fierce rivals Zesco United, by this time he had scored 52 goals in 7 seasons with Zanaco.

Kalengo hit the ground running at Zesco United scoring on debut in Week 1 in a 2–0 win over Kabwe Warriors. Kalengo went to finish the season on 8 goals though Zesco United did not win the Primera Division de Zambia title.

=== Return to Zanaco FC ===
In 2012 Kalengo hit a snag as he went back to his Zanaco days where he struggled for goals, scoring only 5 that season.

=== Return to Zesco United FC ===
2013 was an outstanding year for Kalengo, Scoring 13 ZSL goals which is his second highest goal scoring feat. Zesco United couldn't win the title though as Nkana won it in an enthralling title race that lasted till the last day. Kalengo's last goal of that season was against Nkana in Week 29 which took him to 78 goals which is an unprecedented goal tally since 2004.

2014 and 2015 saw Kalengo win back to back Primera Division de Zambia titles with Zesco United. He finished as top scorer in the league in the 2015 season scoring 18 goals, meaning he would leave Zesco United for A.C. Leopards on a high.

==== A.C. Leopards ====
In December 2015, A.C. Leopards confirmed that they had signed Kalengo on a 1-year contract from Zesco United.

=== Return to Zesco United (2017) ===
Winston Kalengo has made it clear that he intends to return to Zesco United after his contract with A.C. Leopards ends.

Kalengo retired at the end of the 2021–22 season, after winning the club's player of the season award for 2021–22.

== After football ==
He was appointed as a physical trainer by ZESCO United in June 2022.

== Style of play ==
Kalengo is particularly noted for his strength, acceleration, and ability to retain possession of the ball. Being effective both with the ball at his feet and in the air, allows him to be a prolific goalscorer. He has been known to strike the ball with force, being clinically effective in one on one situations with goalkeepers.

Specializing in central positions, Kalengo's style revolves around beating the goalkeeper with speed and depth. However, he occasionally drifts to the wings, leaving his team with no options in the middle, and, at times, lacks the ability to track back.

== Career statistics ==
Scores and results list Zambia's goal tally first.

| No | Date | Venue | Opponent | Score | Result | Competition |
|---|---|---|---|---|---|---|
| 1. | 21 June 2015 | Independence Stadium, Windhoek, Namibia | Namibia | 1–0 | 1–2 | 2016 African Nations Championship qualification |
| 2. | 4 July 2015 | Nkoloma Stadium, Lusaka, Zambia | Namibia | 2–1 | 2–1 (6–5 p) | 2016 African Nations Championship qualification |
| 3. | 6 September 2015 | Nyayo National Stadium, Nairobi, Kenya | Kenya | 1–1 | 2–1 | 2017 Africa Cup of Nations qualification |
| 4. | 17 October 2015 | Levy Mwanawasa Stadium, Ndola, Zambia | Mozambique | 1–0 | 3–0 | 2016 African Nations Championship qualification |
| 5. | 11 November 2015 | Karima Stadium, Karima, Sudan | Sudan | 1–0 | 1–0 | 2018 FIFA World Cup qualification |
| 6. | 15 November 2015 | Levy Mwanawasa Stadium, Ndola, Zambia | Sudan | 2–0 | 2–0 | 2018 FIFA World Cup qualification |
| 7. | 23 March 2016 | Levy Mwanawasa Stadium, Ndola, Zambia | Congo | 1–0 | 1–1 | 2017 Africa Cup of Nations qualification |
| 8. | 27 March 2016 | Stade Alphonse Massemba-Débat, Brazzaville, Republic of Congo | Congo | 1–1 | 1–1 | 2017 Africa Cup of Nations qualification |

== Records ==
Kalengo is the leading scorer in ties between Zesco United and Zanaco. He has scored 12 times in these ties with 6 goals for each team. Another statistic about Kalengo is that he has only lost in 3 matches that he has scored in. In a career stretching over 9 years. And Kalengo's teams have won 52 matches in which he has scored in and drawn 6 matches.

If Kalengo scored, his team had an approximately 85% chance of winning. His first loss in a match in which he scored came against Forest Rangers in 2005, ending Zanaco's 40-match unbeaten league record that stretched back to 2004.

Kalengo finished the 2015 Primera Division de Zambia season as top scorer with 18 goals, helping Zesco United to the league title.

== Nicknames ==
Zesco United's Colombian fans nicknamed him 'Kalengoal'.

== Honours ==
Zanaco

Winner

- Zambian Premier League: 2005, 2006, 2009

ZESCO United

Winner

- Zambian Premier League: 2014, 2015

Individual

- Zambia Super League Top scorer: 2006
