= Shaft Katuka =

Zambian footballer (born 1979)

Personal information
- Date of birth: 31 March 1979 (age 47)
- Place of birth: Lusaka, Zambia
- Height: 1.79 m (5 ft 10 in)
- Position: Midfielder

Senior career*
Years	Team	Apps	(Gls)
2004–2006	Red Arrows F.C.		
2007–2009	Young Arrows F.C.		
2010–2016	Forest Rangers F.C.		

International career
2007	Zambia	1	(0)
- * Club domestic league appearances and goals

Shaft Katuka (born 31 March 1979) is a retired Zambian football midfielder.
