= Jimmy Ndhlovu =

Zambian footballer (born 1992)

Personal information
- Date of birth: 18 December 1992 (age 33)
- Place of birth: Lusaka, Zambia
- Height: 1.68 m (5 ft 6 in)
- Position: Forward

Team information
- Current team: Kabwe Warriors F.C.

Senior career*
Years	Team	Apps	(Gls)
2008–2012	Red Arrows F.C.		
2013	ZESCO United F.C.		
2013	Nkana F.C.		
2014–2018	Power Dynamos F.C.		
2019–	Kabwe Warriors F.C.		

International career
2009–2015	Zambia	5	(0)
- * Club domestic league appearances and goals

Jimmy Ndhlovu (born 18 December 1992) is a Zambian football striker who currently plays for Kabwe Warriors F.C. in the Zambian Premier League
