= Whiteson Simwanza =

Zambian footballer (born 1984)

White Simwanza
Personal information
- Date of birth: 11 December 1984 (age 41)
- Place of birth: Zambia
- Height: 1.86 m (6 ft 1 in)
- Position: Midfielder

Senior career*
Years	Team	Apps	(Gls)
- Young Arrows F.C.
- Red Arrows F.C.
2009	RoPS	21	(0)

International career
2007–	Zambia	9	(0)
- * Club domestic league appearances and goals as of 14 October 2009

Whiteson Simwanza (born 11 December 1984), also known as White Simwanza, is a Zambian football midfielder who played last time for RoPS. Simwanza had a contract with RoPS until the end of season 2011. But it was terminated at the end of season 2009.

Simwanza came to RoPS and Rovaniemi before Finnish Premier Division season 2009 started. He signed with RoPS 3-years long contract, until end of season 2011. Due his playing style, he was leading the charts of collecting yellow cards in Finnish Premier Division season 2009. Currently he has collected seven yellow cards in eleven games and later at the end of season he was on the top of table after collecting 10 yellow cards. After his first season with RoPS, the team was relegated to Finnish Ykkönen and Simwanza was released on a free.

Simwanza has played in Zambia's national football team. According to the RoPS official site he has played nine games.
