= Chiwanki Lyainga =

Zambian footballer (c. 1983 – 2014)

Personal information
- Date of birth: c. 1983
- Place of birth: Lusaka, Zambia
- Date of death: 3 February 2014 (aged 30)
- Place of death: Lusaka, Zambia
- Position: Midfielder

Senior career*
Years	Team	Apps	(Gls)
2006	Power Dynamos F.C.		
2007–2008	Young Arrows F.C.		
2009–2014	Red Arrows		

International career^{‡}
2008	Zambia	2	(1)
- * Club domestic league appearances and goals as of 5 February 2014 ‡ National team caps and goals as of 5 February 2014

Chiwanki Lyainga (c. 1983 – 3 February 2014) was a Zambian football player from Lusaka, Zambia.

== Club career ==
Lyainga played for Zambian football clubs Red Arrows and Power Dynamos.

== International career ==
Lyainga earned two caps for Zambia in 2008, scoring one goal in a friendly match against Libya. He was a member of Zambia's squad for the 2008 COSAFA Cup.

== Death ==
Lyainga, aged 30, died in a Lusaka hospital after being stabbed in Chawama Township. Police believe he got into an argument with a bar patron and was killed in retaliation.
