= Paul Musamali =

Ugandan footballer (born 1994)

Musamali Paul
Personal information
- Full name: Musamali Paul
- Date of birth: 20 October 1994 (age 32)
- Place of birth: Mbale District, Uganda
- Height: 1.76 m (5 ft 9 1/2 in)
- Position: Left back

Team information
- Current team: Buildcon F.C.
- Number: 29

Youth career
- 2010: Mbale Heroes
- 2012–2013: Kampala University

Senior career*
Years	Team	Apps	(Gls)
2012–2014	Villa SC		
2014–2015	Western Stima		
2015–2017	Kampala City Council	47	(1)
2018–	Buildcon F.C		

International career^{‡}
2017	Uganda	3	(0)
- * Club domestic league appearances and goals as of 15:23, 28 November 2018 (UTC) ‡ National team caps and goals as of 28 November 2018

Paul Musamali (born 20 October 1994) is a Ugandan international footballer who plays as a left back for Buildcon F.C in the Zambian Premier League and for the Uganda national team.

== Club career ==
=== SC Villa ===
Musamali joined SC Villa in 2012. Made his debut against Express FC and scored his first goal for SC Villa against Ndejje University FC in the Uganda Cup.

=== Western Stima ===
He joined Western Stima in 2014, making his debut against Nakumatt FC and scored his first goal against Kakamega Homeboyz

=== K.C.C.A ===
In 2016, Musamali joined Kampala City Council making his debut against Vipers and scoring his first goal for Kampala City Council against Onduparaka.

=== Buildcon F.C. ===
Musamali joined Buildcon F.C on a two-year contract. He made his debut against Kabwe Warriors.

== International career ==
Musamali made his debut for the Uganda national team on 14 July 2017 against South Sudan Chan 2018 qualifiers.

== Honours ==
Kampala University FC

- University Football League (UFL) : 1
  - 2013,

Kampala Capital City Authority FC

- Ugandan Super League: 1
  - 2017
- Uganda Cup: 2
  - 2017, 2018

== Personal honors ==
Kampala University FC

- Best player UFL :2013

Kampala Capital City Authority FC

- Most Displined Player : 2017
