= Owen Kaposa =

Zambian footballer (born 1983)

Personal information
- Date of birth: 26 August 1983 (age 43)
- Position: Midfielder

Senior career*
Years	Team	Apps	(Gls)
2003	Young Arrows F.C.		
2004–2008	ZESCO United F.C.		
2009–2014	Forest Rangers F.C.		

International career
2004–2005	Zambia	3	(1)
- * Club domestic league appearances and goals

Owen Kaposa (born 26 August 1983) is a retired Zambian football midfielder.
