= Benjamin Nenkavu =

Namibian footballer

Personal information
- Full name: Benjamin Kangau Nenkavu
- Date of birth: 14 June 1993 (age 33)
- Place of birth: Ongwediva, Namibia
- Height: 1.78 m (5 ft 10 in)
- Position: Defender

Team information
- Current team: Buildcon

Senior career*
Years	Team	Apps	(Gls)
2013–2018	United Africa Tigers		
2018–	Buildcon		

International career^{‡}
2015–	Namibia	12	(2)
- * Club domestic league appearances and goals as of 15:22, 13 July 2020 (UTC) ‡ National team caps and goals as of 15:22, 13 July 2020 (UTC)

Benjamin Kangau Nenkavu (born 14 June 1993) is a Namibian footballer who plays as a defender for Zambian side Buildcon and the Namibia national football team.

== Club career ==
He signed for Zambian side Buildcon in November 2018.

== Career statistics ==
=== International career ===
As of 13 July 2020

Appearances and goals by national team and year
National team	Year	Apps	Goals
Namibia
Namibia	2015	3	2
Namibia	2017	6	0
Namibia	2018	3	0
Total		12	2
