= Derrick Shapande =

Zambian footballer

Personal information
- Place of birth: Ndola, Zambia
- Position: Defender

Senior career*
Years	Team	Apps	(Gls)
- Ndola Wanderers F.C.
–2003	Young Arrows F.C.		
2004–2007	Red Arrows F.C.		

International career
2004	Zambia	1	(0)
- * Club domestic league appearances and goals

Derrick Shapande is a retired Zambian football defender.
