= Austin Muwowo =

Zambian footballer (born 1996)

Personal information
- Full name: Austin Kaunda Muwowo
- Date of birth: 26 September 1996 (age 30)
- Place of birth: Zambia
- Height: 1.67 m (5 ft 6 in)
- Position: Right winger

Team information
- Current team: Power Dynamos F.C.
- Number: 26

Senior career*
Years	Team	Apps	(Gls)
2016–2019	Nkana F.C.		
2018–2019	→ Forest Rangers (loan)		
2019–2022	Orlando Pirates F.C.	9	(0)
2022-2023	ZESCO United	2	(0)
2023-	Power Dynamos F.C.	1	(0)

International career^{‡}
2019–	Zambia	3	(1)
- * Club domestic league appearances and goals as of 19 October 2019 ‡ National team caps and goals as of 19 October 2019

Austin Kaunda Muwowo (born 26 September 1996) is a Zambian footballer who plays as a forward for Orlando Pirates F.C. and the Zambia national football team.

== Career ==
=== International ===
==== International Goals ====
Scores and results list Zambia's goal tally first.

Goal	Date	Venue	Opponent	Score	Result	Competition
1.	2 June 2019	Princess Magogo Stadium, KwaMashu, South Africa	Malawi	1–2	2–2 (4–2 p)	2019 COSAFA Cup

== Honours ==
=== Individual ===
- Zambia Super League Top scorer: 2019
