= Sebastian Mwange =

Zambian footballer (born 1991)

Personal information
- Date of birth: 18 December 1991 (age 34)
- Place of birth: Mufulira, Zambia
- Height: 1.89 m (6 ft 2 in)
- Position: Goalkeeper

Team information
- Current team: Green Eagles F.C.
- Number: 1

Senior career*
Years	Team	Apps	(Gls)
2011	Mufulira Blackpool		
2012	Nchanga Rangers		
2013–2015	Roan United		
2015	National Assembly		
2016	Gomes		
2017	Nchanga Rangers		
2018–	Green Eagles		

International career^{‡}
2019–	Zambia	11	(0)
- * Club domestic league appearances and goals ‡ National team caps and goals as of 14 June 2021

Sebastian Mwange (born 18 December 1991) is a Zambian footballer who plays as a goalkeeper for Green Eagles F.C. and the Zambia national football team.

== Honours ==
=== Individual ===
- COSAFA Cup Golden Glove: 2019
