= Osas Idehen =

Nigerian footballer

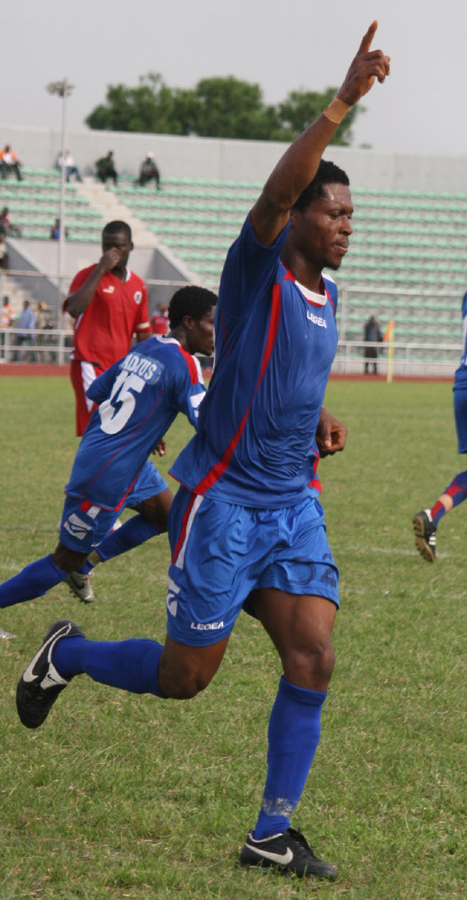

Personal information
- Full name: Phillip Osamudienwen Idehen
- Date of birth: 13 May 1990 (age 36)
- Place of birth: Umuahia, Nigeria
- Height: 1.80 m (5 ft 11 in)
- Position: Striker

Team information
- Current team: Buildcon F.C.

Youth career
- 2006–2007: Akwa United

Senior career*
Years	Team	Apps	(Gls)
2007	Akwa United		
2008–2010	Enyimba		
2010-2011	Haiphong FC		
2012–2014	Sunshine Stars		
2014–2017	Abia Warriors F.C.		
2017	Buildcon F.C.		
2018	Sunshine Stars		

International career
2010–	Nigeria	1	(2)
- * Club domestic league appearances and goals

Phillip Osamudienwen "Osas" Idehen (born 13 May 1990) is a Nigerian former professional footballer who plays as a striker.

== International career ==
He made his international debut for Nigeria on 3 March 2010, scoring a brace against Congo DR in a friendly match.
