= Tapson Kaseba =

Zambian footballer (1992–2025)

Personal information
- Date of birth: 8 December 1992
- Place of birth: Lusaka, Zambia
- Date of death: September 2025 (aged 32)
- Place of death: Lusaka, Zambia
- Height: 1.80 m (5 ft 11 in)
- Position: Forward

Senior career*
Years	Team	Apps	(Gls)
2011–2012	Kansanshi Dynamos		
2013–2017	Konkola Blades		
2018–2019	Green Eagles		
2020–2025	NAPSA Stars		

International career
2019–2020	Zambia	8	(1)
- * Club domestic league appearances and goals

Tapson Kaseba (8 December 1992 – September 2025) was a Zambian footballer who played as a forward for NAPSA Stars and the Zambia national team.

Kaseba died in September 2025, at the age of 32, following a short illness.

== Career statistics ==
Scores and results list Zambia's goal tally first, score column indicates score after each Kaseba goal.

List of international goals scored by Tapson Kaseba
No.	Date	Venue	Opponent	Score	Result	Competition
1	8 June 2019	Moses Mabhida Stadium, Durban, South Africa	Botswana	1–0	1–0	2019 COSAFA Cup
