= Moffat Mtonga =

Zambian footballer (born 1983)

Personal information
- Date of birth: 10 April 1983 (age 43)
- Place of birth: Lusaka, Zambia
- Height: 1.70 m (5 ft 7 in)
- Position: Midfielder

Senior career*
Years	Team	Apps	(Gls)
1999	Nkwazi F.C.		
2000–2001	Zamsure F.C.		
2002	Red Arrows F.C.		
2003–2004	Young Arrows F.C.		
2005–2006	Red Arrows F.C.		
2007–2009	Young Arrows F.C.		

International career
2006	Zambia	1	(0)
- * Club domestic league appearances and goals

Moffat Mtonga (born 10 April 1983) is a Zambian retired football midfielder.
