= Amity Shamende =

Zambian footballer (born 1993)

Personal information
- Date of birth: 4 August 1993 (age 33)
- Place of birth: Mwanachilenga, Zambia
- Height: 1.66 m (5 ft 5 in)
- Position: Attacking midfielder

Team information
- Current team: Green Eagles

Senior career*
Years	Team	Apps	(Gls)
2014–2016	Nampundwe		
2017	National Assembly		
2018–	Green Eagles		

International career^{‡}
2019–	Zambia	14	(2)
- * Club domestic league appearances and goals as of 11 October 2021 ‡ National team caps and goals as of 11 October 2021

Amity Shamende (born 4 August 1993) is a Zambian professional footballer who plays as an attacking midfielder for Green Eagles and the Zambia national football team.
