= Dube Phiri =

Zambian footballer (born 1983)

Adubelo "Dube" Phiri (born 16 January 1983) is a retired Zambian footballer. He appeared for the Zambian national team from 2005 to 2010. His club career was from 2002 to 2017.

== Career ==
During his career he mostly played for Red Arrows F.C. in Lusaka and associated teams, except for spending 2007 at Clube Desportivo da Huíla in Lubango, 2008-2009 at Primeiro de Agosto in Luanda, and 2017 at the Lusaka Dynamos F.C..

== International career ==
He was a part of the Zambian squad at the 2008 African Cup of Nations and 2008 African Cup of Nations.

== Honours ==
- Zambia Super League Top scorer: 2005
