= Idris Mbombo =

Congolese football player

Idris Ilunga Mbombo
Personal information
- Full name: Idris Ilunga Mbombo
- Date of birth: 22 August 1996 (age 30)
- Place of birth: Lubumbashi, Zaire
- Height: 1.82 m (6 ft 0 in)
- Position: Striker

Team information
- Current team: Nkana F.C.
- Number: 20

Senior career*
Years	Team	Apps	(Gls)
–2015	Kabwe Warriors F.C.		
2015–2017	ZESCO United F.C.		
2017–2018	Al-Shabab	0	(0)
2017	KF Laçi→(loan)	1	(0)
2018	Nkana F.C.		(20)
2018–2019	Al-Hilal Club	14	(7)
2019-	Nkana F.C.		
- * Club domestic league appearances and goals

Idris Ilunga Mbombo (born 1 June 1996 in Lubumbashi, DR Congo) is a Congolese professional footballer who currently plays for Nkana in the Zambia Super League.

== Zambia ==
Netting over 33 goals to aid Kabwe Warriors in their quest for promotion in 2015, Mbombo gained cult hero status at the club despite staying for only one season.

Earning a reported salary of 17000 Zambian kwacha a month with ZESCO United, the Congolese forward once gave an impertinent gesture to ZESCO fans after scoring for them, later apologizing for his conduct.

Was recalled to Kabwe warriors from ZESCO United in winter 2016.

He was set to join Tanzanian Club Yanga in 2020 but the deal fell through before he joined the Egyptian Club Gouna FC.

== Honours ==
=== Individual ===
- Zambia Super League Top scorer: 2018, 2024–25
