= Kitwe United F.C. =

Zambian football club

Kitwe United
- Full name: Kitwe United Football Club
- Ground: Garden Park; Kitwe, Zambia
- Capacity: 15,000
- League: Zambian Division One
- 2018: 13th

Kitwe United Football Club is a Zambian football club based in Kitwe. They play in the first division of Zambian football. Their home stadium is Garden Park. Returned to premier League in 2018, winning Coach Ghanaian born Ernest Kofi, Captain Moses Lolozi, Technical Director Andrew C Katebe. Demoted to national League during the transitional league 2019 and returned to premier league in 2020 winning coach Steven Mwansa, Captain Moses Lolozi, Technical Directed Andrew C Katebe.

== Achievements ==
- Zambian Challenge Cup: 2: 1971
