= Chambishi F.C. =

Zambian football club

- Full name: Chambishi Football Club
- Nickname: Mauzu
- Ground: Chambishi Stadium, Chambishi, Zambia
- Capacity: 5,000
- Manager: Keegan Chibuye
- League: Zambian National League (2026 Transitional Season)

Chambishi F.C. is football (soccer) club from Zambia based in Chambishi. They are playing in the Zambia National Division One. They play their home games at Chambishi Stadium.

== Overview ==
Chambishi Football Club is based in small town of Chambishi, several kilometres from Kitwe.n teams, apart from the national team.

Moses Chikwalakwala, who died in the Gabon air crash which killed the entire Zambia National Soccer Team en route to Senegal for World Cup qualifiers, played for Chambishi, as did Webster Chikabala (Master Mukishi), who was once Zambia's best midfielder. The team also has had Emmanuel Siwale, the Bunda Mwaba, Ziko Chanda Makasa Kalipinde, and Charles 'Pops' Mutale.

Chambishi were promoted to the 2021/22 Zambia Premier League after spending 11 years outside the top division. They were also promoted in 2007.
