= Buildcon F.C. =

Zambian association football club based in Ndola

- Full name: Buildcon Football Club
- Nickname(s): Team Kopala
- Founded: 2012
- Ground: Levy Mwanawasa Stadium, Ndola
- Capacity: 49,800
- Owner: Moses Mubanga
- Manager: Tenant Chambo
- League: MTN/FAZ Super Division

Buildcon FC is a Zambian football club based in Ndola that played in the MTN/FAZ Super Division. It is known for having an African multi-national squad.

== History ==
Buildcon were founded in Choma as AM Welding in 2012.

Buildcon were promoted to the Zambian Premier League in 2017 after winning the Division One. Before the 2017 season the club changed its name and city, relocating north to Ndola. The club had been sold to Buildcon Investments, a Ndola building company, after the start of the 2016 season. Buildcon had originally petitioned to change their name after the first game of the 2016 season, but were not allowed.

After their promotion, Buildcon developed a reputation as heavy spenders. They were the first team in the Zambian league to register more than 25 foreign players on their books and frequently fielded teams of 11 non-Zambian players. The non-Zambian influence helped Buildcon avoid immediate relegation, finishing ninth on their debut 2017 Premier League season.

Buildcon dropped 14 foreign players and added more Zambian players for the 2018 season including international Chisamba Lungu.

== Players ==
=== First-team players ===
Note: Flags indicate national team as defined under FIFA eligibility rules; some limited exceptions apply. Players may hold more than one non-FIFA nationality.

No.	Pos.	Nation	Player
—	GK	(Guinea) GUI	Abdul Aziz Keita
—	GK	(Zambia) ZAM	Scott Mwanza
—	DF	(Uganda) UGA	Paul Musamali
—	DF	(Burundi) BDI	David Nshimirimana
—	DF	(Namibia) NAM	Benjamin Nenkavu
—	DF	(Zambia) ZAM	Isaac Shamujompa
—	DF	(Democratic Republic of the Congo) COD	Mbengela Bosandja
—	DF	(Ghana) GHA	Masawudu Basit
—	DF	(Zambia) ZAM	Emmanuel Gora

No.	Pos.	Nation	Player
—	MF	(Nigeria) NGA	Sulaimon Akinyemi
—	MF	(Zambia) ZAM	Lazarous Chishimba
—	MF	(Ghana) GHA	Mutawakil Abubakar
—	MF	(Ghana) GHA	Najeeb Abass
—	FW	(Uganda) UGA	Paul Musamali
—	FW	(Zambia) ZAM	Emmanuel Kalala
—	FW	(Nigeria) NGA	Osas Idehen
—	FW	(Zambia) ZAM	Brian Mwila
—	FW	(Zambia) ZAM	Biston Banda

==== Notable former players ====
- (Uganda) Isaac Isinde
- (Uganda) Kezron kizito
- (United Kingdom) Suleiman Bolatsa Bakalandwa
