= Green Eagles F.C. =

Zambian football club

Green Eagles FC
- Full name: Green Eagles Football Club
- Nicknames: The Stubborn, Tonka Tweende
- Founded: 1997; 29 years ago
- Ground: Choma Independence Stadium; Choma, Zambia
- Capacity: 3,000
- Chairman: Jim K. Kafumukache
- Coach: Aggrey Chiyangi
- League: Zambia Super League
- 2025–26: 6th

Green Eagles Football Club is a Zambian football club based in Choma, Zambia. It is sponsored by the Zambia National Service (ZNS). The club was founded in 1997 as Choma Eagles Football Club and currently plays in the MTN/FAZ Super Division.

For much of its early history, Green Eagles was a mid-table or relegation-threatened side. However, in the late 2010s the club experienced a notable resurgence, transforming itself into a consistent contender for the league title. This rise has been attributed to strong backing from ZNS, focused leadership at the Service, and the tactical discipline instilled by head coach Aggrey Chiyangi, who has also served as caretaker coach of the Zambia national team.

In 2018, Eagles finished 4th in the Super Division, earning qualification to the CAF Confederation Cup. Their best finish came in the 2019 season, when they placed 2nd and qualified for the CAF Champions League. In July 2019, Eagles debuted at the CECAFA Kagame Cup in Rwanda and won bronze after beating AS Maniema Union of DR Congo 2–0 in the third-place playoff. Edward Mwamba and Amity Shamende scored in each half to secure the win.

On 24 August 2019, Green Eagles achieved a historic milestone by eliminating Orlando Pirates of South Africa from the CAF Champions League. Eagles won the first leg 1–0 at Nkoloma Stadium in Lusaka and drew 1–1 away at Orlando Stadium in Soweto to advance 2–1 on aggregate.

== Stadium ==
Green Eagles plays its home matches at the Choma Independence Stadium, which initially had a capacity of about 1,000. Following their qualification for continental competitions, the stadium underwent renovations to increase its capacity to 3,000.

== Former players ==
Players in bold have been capped internationally.

- Kebby Hachipuka
- Tapson Kaseba
- Venacious Mapande
- Bonny Muchindu
- Adamson Mulao
- Kennedy Musonda
- Gozon Mutale
- Sebastian Mwange
- Francis Tindi Mwanza
- Mwansa Nsofwa
- Martin Phiri
- Mwila Phiri
- Amity Shamende
- Spencer Sautu
