= Nakambala Leopards F.C. =

Zambian football club

Nakambala Leopards
- Full name: Nakambala Leopards Football Club
- Nickname(s): Sugar Boys, Sweet Boys
- Ground: Nakambala Stadium, Mazabuka
- Capacity: 5,000
- Manager: Dick Ngwenya
- League: MTN/FAZ Super Division
- 2018: 15th
Home colours	Away colours

Leopards is a Zambian football club based in Mazabuka that plays in the Mazabuka Amateur District League. They play their home games at Nakambala Stadium in Mazabuka.

The club's main sponsor is Zambia Sugar.

The team won promotion to the Zambia Premier League for the 2009 season after coming in second position during the 2008 season, they were relegated in 2009. The club was promoted to the country's top flight league for the 2014 season. However the club pulled out of the Zambian Premier League following the outbreak of the COVID-19 Pandemic as the team's benefactor's Zambia Sugar Company could not allow the team to travel for away games or play home games to help stop the spread of the disease. They were subsequently demoted to the Eden University National League which is the second tier of the Zambian Professional Soccer League but opted to drop to the district developmental league for the very reasons they opted out of the league. Their place was subsequently taken up by Trindent of North Western Province.
