= Zanaco F.C. =

Zambian association football club

Zanaco FC
- Full name: Zanaco Football Club
- Nicknames: The bullets Sensational, Los Banqueros
- Founded: 1978
- Ground: Sunset Stadium, Lusaka
- Capacity: 5,000
- Chairman: Edward Mutale
- Manager: Roy Mutombo (acting)
- League: MTN/FAZ Super Division
- 2025–26: 7th
Home colours

Zanaco FC is a Zambian football club based in Lusaka that plays in the MTN/FAZ Super Division. They play their home games at Sunset Stadium in Lusaka. Zanaco Football Club was formed in 1972 as a social team by management trainees of Zambia National Commercial Bank. The team was launched at LOTUS INN in Lusaka. The founding members were Lloyd Choongo, Ben Banda, Nathan Lupupa and John Kasengele. Starting from the 1980s, Zanaco started growing steadily from a mere social club to becoming one of the most successful and decorated club in Zambian football history. Over the years the Sunset Stadium-based team has won 4 Super League trophies, 4 Charity Shields, 1 Coca-Cola Cup, 1 Mosi Cup and 3 BP Cups. Zanaco are the only team outside of Zambia's Copperbelt Province to have not only won but also defended the Super League Trophy.

Zanaco stands for Zambia National Commercial Bank.

== Achievements ==
- Zambian Premier League: 7
  - 2002, 2003, 2005, 2006, 2009, 2012, 2016
  - Runner up : 2001, 2015, 2017, 2021
- Zambian Cup: 1
  - 2002
  - Finalist : 1998
- ABSA Cup: 1
  - 2017
  - Finalist : 2010, 2016, 2019
- Zambian Charity Shield: 4
  - 2001, 2003, 2006, 2019
- Zambian Challenge Cup: 3
  - 1987, 1988, 2006
- Zambian Coca-Cola Cup: 2
  - 2001, 2004

== Performance in CAF competitions ==
- CAF Champions League: 8 appearances

2003 – First Round
2004 – Second Round
2006 – First Round
2007 – First Round
2010 – Last 16
2017 – Group Stage (Top 16)
2018 – First Round (Relegated to the Confederation Cup)
2022 -

- CAF Confederation Cup: 4 appearances

2010 – Group stage (Top 8)
2016 – Second Round
2018 – Pre-Group Stage
2020 – Quarter Final

- CAF Cup: 2 appearances

2001 – First Round

- CAF Cup Winners' Cup: 1 appearance

2002 – First Round

== Former managers ==
- (Zambia) Dan Kabwe
- (Zambia) George Mungwa(late)
- (Zambia) Wedson Nyirenda
- (Zambia) Fighton Simukonda(late) (2004–07)
- (Zambia) Wesley Mondo(late) (2007–08)
- (Zambia) Keagan Mumba (late) (2012–13)
- (Zambia) Aggrey Chiyangi
- (Zambia) Mumamba Numba
- (Zambia) Chris Kaunda
- (Zambia) kelvin Kaindu
