= Zambia Super League =

Zambian association football league

- Organising body: FAZ
- Founded: 1962; 64 years ago
- Country: Zambia
- Confederation: CAF
- Number of clubs: 18
- Level on pyramid: 1
- Relegation to: National League
- Domestic cup: ABSA Cup
- League cup: Samuel Ndhlovu Charity Shield
- International cups: CAF Champions League; CAF Confederation Cup
- Current champions: Power Dynamos (9th title) (2025–26)
- Most premierships: Nkana (13 titles)
- Broadcaster: SuperSport
- Current: 2026 Zambian Transition League

The Zambia Super League, known as the MTN Super League for sponsorship purposes, is a professional association football league in Zambia and the highest level of the Zambian football league system. Organised by the Football Association of Zambia (FAZ), it is contested by 20 clubs and operates on a system of promotion and relegation with the National League. The league was established in 1962. The 2026 season is being played as a transition competition as Zambian football moves from the August–May calendar to a calendar-year season from 2027.

The league was established as the country's top national football competition in 1962, with Roan United winning the inaugural championship. The competition was originally played within the calendar year, with the season running from March to December. In 2018, the league moved to an August–May schedule following changes to the calendar of CAF club competitions. In 2026, the Zambian Premier League introduced a transition season to allow the competition to return to a calendar-year schedule in 2027. The league was expanded from 18 to 20 clubs as part of the restructuring.

Each club normally plays every other club twice during a full season, once at home and once away. The 2026 transition competition uses a temporary format in which the 20 clubs are divided into two streams of 10 teams. The winners of the two streams meet in a final to determine the transition-season champion.

The Zambia Super League is one of the country's principal football competitions and has produced clubs that have represented Zambia in CAF and CAF Confederation Cup competitions. Nkana are the most successful club in the competition's history, with 13 league titles, while Power Dynamos are the reigning champions from the 2025–26 season.

== History ==
The national football league in Zambia was established in 1962 as the Northern Rhodesia National Football League. Its first annual meeting was held in Ndola on 4 February 1962, where 13 clubs were registered for the inaugural competition. The first matches were played on 4 March 1962. Roan United won the first championship, finishing ahead of City of Lusaka.

The league developed alongside the growth of organised football in the country. In 1966, a second division was introduced, with promotion and relegation between the two divisions. The Charity Shield was introduced the following year. Mufulira Wanderers became the first club to win three consecutive league championships, doing so from 1965 to 1967.

In 1974, the government dissolved the national league as part of a restructuring of football administration. The competition was subsequently reorganised and returned in a new form. In 1982, the Super League was introduced as the country's top division, with Nkana winning the championship that year. Nkana later became the most successful club in the competition, winning a record 13 league titles. The league entered a period of commercial sponsorship in 1993 when Finance Bank became its sponsor. Sponsorship arrangements later changed, and the competition became known as the MTN Super League after MTN Zambia became the title sponsor.

The competition used a calendar-year season for most of its history. In 2019, the league underwent a transition to move from the calendar-year system to an August–May season, following changes to the CAF club competition calendar. The 2019 Zambia Super League was contested by 20 clubs divided into two streams of 10. Each club played 18 matches in its stream, with the winners of the two streams meeting in a championship play-off. ZESCO United and Green Eagles won their respective streams, with ZESCO United defeating Nkana on penalties in the championship play-off. The transition reduced the league from 20 to 18 clubs for the new August–May season.

The 2019–20 season became the first full season played under the new August–May calendar. However, the competition was interrupted by the COVID-19 pandemic and was ended after 27 matches. FAZ declared Nkana champions, as they were leading the table when the season was stopped.

The league continued under the August–May calendar through the 2025–26 season. Power Dynamos won the championship, securing their ninth league title. In 2026, the league underwent another transition, this time to return to a calendar-year season. The 2026 Transition League was introduced as a temporary competition between the August–May and calendar-year systems. The competition consists of 20 clubs divided into two streams of 10, with the clubs allocated according to their positions in the 2025–26 Super League. The transition season is scheduled to be followed by the first full calendar-year season in 2027.

== Format ==
The league is contested by 18 teams every season. Until 2018, it was scheduled to run within the calendar year from March to December. Since then, owing to the decision by CAF on 20 July 2017 to switch from their traditional across-year runtime/schedule of their club competitions to align with that of the UEFA/European calendar, it currently runs from August to May.

After each season and assuming Zambia is among the top 12 countries in the current CAF 5-year ranking system, the top 4 teams will qualify for CAF competitions; the top 2 qualify for the CAF Champions League and the two teams finishing below the top 2 positions on the league table qualifies for the CAF Confederation Cup. The teams who finish in the final 3 positions of the table are relegated to the National League and replaced with the teams who finish in the top 3 positions of the National League table.

== Broadcasting ==
From 2007 to 2025, South Africa-based SuperSport held the international broadcast rights to the Zambia Super League. The partnership began with an agreement signed in 2007 ahead of the 2008 season and continued for 18 years. SuperSport announced in March 2025 that it would not seek to renew the agreement beyond the end of the 2024–25 season.

In August 2025, the Zambian Premier League signed a five-year broadcasting agreement with TopStar, replacing SuperSport as the league's broadcast partner. The agreement covers the MTN Super League and provides for matches to be shown through several television and digital platforms, including the TopStar mobile application, Sun Sport, ZNBC TV3, Sports Focus and StarTimes.

During the 2025–26 season, broadcasts were temporarily suspended following a dispute between the Zambian Premier League and TopStar. The two parties reached an agreement in April 2026, allowing live broadcasts of league matches to resume from the 28th week of the season. For the 2026 transition season, TopStar remains the league's broadcast partner and is televising selected matches live. Some fixtures may be changed to accommodate television scheduling.

== Sponsorship ==
In 2018, FAZ struck a deal with the MTN Group of South Africa to sponsor the league being worth initially $4 million (ZMW 7,571,280) for 5 years which has since been extended till date. Via telecasting the league on SuperSport, the prize money given to each league team is ZMW300,000 ($ 15,848.52). The league runners-up receives ZMW 350,000 ($ 18,489.94) and the other 16 teams receive ZMW 200,000 ($ 10,565.68).

Position	Team	Prize money (ZMW/K)	Telecast prize	Total
1	ZESCO United	500,000	300,000	800,000
2	Green Eagles	350,000	300,000	650,000
3	Buildcon	200,000	300,000	500,000
4	Zanaco	200,000	300,000	500,000

== Champions ==
The previous league winners are as follows:

Club	Winners	Runners-up	Winning seasons
Nkana	13		1982, 1983, 1985, 1986, 1988, 1989, 1990, 1992, 1993, 1999, 2001, 2013, 2019–20
Mufulira Wanderers	9		1963, 1965, 1966, 1967, 1969, 1976, 1978, 1995, 1996
Power Dynamos	9		1984, 1991, 1994, 1997, 2000, 2011, 2022–23, 2024–25, 2025–26
ZESCO United	9		2007, 2008, 2010, 2014, 2015, 2017, 2018, 2019, 2020–21
Zanaco	7		2002, 2003, 2005, 2006, 2009, 2012, 2016
Green Buffaloes	6		1973, 1974, 1975, 1977, 1979, 1981
Kabwe Warriors	5		1968, 1970, 1971, 1972, 1987
Red Arrows	3		2004, 2021–22, 2023–24
Nchanga Rangers	2		1980, 1998
City of Lusaka	1		1964
Roan United	1		1962

Italics indicate clubs that are no longer competing in the Zambia Super League.

== Qualification for CAF competitions ==
=== Association ranking for the 2026–27 CAF club season ===
The association ranking for the 2026–27 CAF Champions League and the 2026–27 CAF Confederation Cup are based on results from each CAF club competition from 2021–22 to the 2025–26 season with the 2026–27 season currently underway.

Legend

- CL: CAF Champions League
- CC: CAF Confederation Cup
- **Associations in bold** are still active in 2026–27 CAF club competitions.
Associations ranked 1–12 are eligible to enter two teams in each CAF club competition.

Rank			Association	2021–22 (× 1)		2022–23 (× 2)		2023–24 (× 3)		2024–25 (× 4)		2025–26 (× 5)		Total
2026	2025	Mvt	Association	CL	CC	CL	CC	CL	CC	CL	CC	CL	CC	Total
1	1	—	**Egypt**	7	4	8	2.5	7	7	10	4	6	6	190
2	2	—	**Morocco**	9	5	8	2	2	4	5	5	9	5	162
3	4	+1	**Algeria**	7	1	6	5	2	3	5	5	3	8	140
4	3	-1	**South Africa**	5	4	4	3	4	1.5	9	3	6	2	127.5
5	5	—	**Tanzania**	0	2	3	4	6	0	2	4	3	1.5	80.5
6	6	—	**Tunisia**	5	1	4	2	6	1	3	0.5	4	0	73
7	7	—	**Angola**	5	0	2	0	3	1.5	2	2	2	0	48.5
8	8	—	**DR Congo**	0	3	1	2	4	0	2	0	1	2	44
9	9	—	**Sudan**	3	0	3	0	2	0	3	0	3	0	42
10	13	+3	**Mali**	0	0	0	1	0	2	1	0.5	3	1	34
11	10	-1	**Ivory Coast**	0	1	0	3	3	0	1	2	0	0.5	30.5
12	12	—	**Nigeria**	0	0	0	2	0	2	0	1	1	0	19
13	11	-2	Libya	0	5	0	0.5	0	3	0	0	0	0	15
14	19	+5	**Congo**	0	1	0	1	0	0.5	0	0	0	2	14.5
15	24	+9	**Zambia**	0	0.5	0	0	0	0	0	0	2	0.5	13
16	14	-2	Ghana	0	0	0	0	1	3	0	0	0	0	12
17	15	-2	Guinea	1	0	2	0	0	0.5	0	0	0	0	6.5
18	16	-2	Botswana	1	0	0	0	1	0	0	0.5	0	0	6
18	18	—	Mauritania	0	0	0	0	2	0	0	0	0	0	6
20	17	-3	Senegal	0	0	0	0	0	0	0	1	0	0	4
21	—	new	**Kenya**	0	0	0	0	0	0	0	0	0	0.5	2.5
21	20	-1	Cameroon	0	0.5	1	0	0	0	0	0	0	0	2.5
23	23	—	Mozambique	0	0	0	0	0	0	0	0.5	0	0	2
23	21	-2	Togo	0	0	0	1	0	0	0	0	0	0	2
23	22	-1	Uganda	0	0	1	0	0	0	0	0	0	0	2
26	25	-1	Eswatini	0	0.5	0	0	0	0	0	0	0	0	0.5
26	25	-1	Niger	0	0.5	0	0	0	0	0	0	0	0	0.5

== Top goalscorers ==
Season	Goalscorer	Club	Goals
2002	(Zambia) Rotson Kilambe	Zanaco	17
2002	(Zambia) Zachariah Simukonda	Red Arrows	17
2003	(Zambia) Francis Kombe	Power Dynamos	18
2003	(Zambia) John Lomani	Power Dynamos	18
2003	(Zambia) Musonda Mweuke	Kabwe Warriors	18
2004	(Zambia) Jimmy Mumba	Green Buffaloes	15
2005	(Zambia) Dube Phiri	Red Arrows	28
2006	(Zambia) Winston Kalengo	Zanaco	28
2007	(Zambia) Rainford Kalaba	Zesco United	23
2008	(Zambia) Rodgers Kola	Zanaco	13
2013	(Zambia) Reynold Kampamba	Nkana	18
2014	(Zambia) Jackson Mwanza	ZESCO United	15
2015	(Zambia) Winston Kalengo	ZESCO United	18
2016	(Democratic Republic of the Congo) Walter Bwalya	Nkana	24
2017	(Democratic Republic of the Congo) Chris Mugalu	Lusaka Dynamos	21
2018	(Democratic Republic of the Congo) Idris Mbombo	Nkana	20
2019	(Burundi) Laudit Mavugo	NAPSA Stars	10
2019	(Zambia) Austin Muwowo	Forest Rangers	10
2019–20	(Zambia) James Chamanga	Power Dynamos	16
2020–21	(Zambia) Moses Phiri	Green Buffaloes	17
2021–22	(Zambia) Ricky Banda	Red Arrows	15
2022–23	(Democratic Republic of the Congo) Andy Boyeli	Chambishi	16
2023–24	(Zambia) Freddy Michael	Green Eagles	11
2024–25	(Democratic Republic of the Congo) Idris Mbombo	Nkana	14
