= Ginger Pensulo =

Zambian footballer (1934–2021)

Personal information
- Full name: John Pensulo
- Birth name: John Mulenga
- Date of birth: 1 June 1934
- Place of birth: Mansa, Northern Rhodesia
- Date of death: 18 April 2021 (aged 86)
- Place of death: Luanshya, Zambia
- Position: Midfielder

Youth career
- 1950–1952: Mikomfwa Youth Club
- 1952–1954: Roan Youth Club

Senior career*
Years	Team	Apps	(Gls)
1954–1956	Roan Antelope Amateur Club		
1961	Ndola Black Follies		
1961–1962	Roan Antelope Amateur Club		
1962–1972	Roan United		

International career
1957–1964	Northern Rhodesia		
1964–1968	Zambia		

Managerial career
- 1965–1972: Roan United (player-coach)
- 1972–1981: Roan United
- 1981–1986: Roan United (Technical Advisor)
- 1987–1988: Zamefa
- 1989–1991: Luanshya Mine Police
- 1991–1997: Luanshya United
- 2009–2011: Luanshya United (Technical Advisor)
- * Club domestic league appearances and goals

John "Ginger" Pensulo (born John Mulenga; 1 June 1934 – 18 April 2021) was a Zambian footballer and coach. A key player for Roan United, he led the club to the Zambian league title in its inaugural season in 1962 and was one of the men behind the team's fluid style of play, being involved in various coaching roles.

Regarded as one of his country's greatest players, Pensulo played for the Northern Rhodesian African national team and was selected for the Zambian team when his country gained independence in October 1964. He scored a significant goal in one of the first ever inter-racial football matches in April 1961, which not only heralded multi-racial football but also helped to usher in Zambia's independence.

== Early life ==
Pensulo was born in a village near Mansa and though all his official documents show his birth of date as 1 June 1937, his actual year of birth is 1934. He later explained that he adjusted his age on the advice of a welfare officer at Roan Antelope Copper Mines called Bennie Evans, so that he could stand a good chance of being selected for one of the mine football teams.

The family moved to Luanshya when he was four months old though his parents divorced not long afterwards and his mother later married Pensulo Mwaba, a first-aid instructor at Roan Antelope Mine's Shaft number 14 in, whose name he adopted. When Pensulo and his mother moved to Roan Antelope Mine township to join his step father, he started playing football on the streets with other boys in the neighbourhood using tennis balls or balls made from rags, and when youth competitions were introduced between the various sections in the mine townships he began harbouring ambitions of playing for the Roan Antelope and Northern Rhodesia football teams.

Pensulo attended Central and Roan schools but only as far as what was then Standard Four, owing to lack of support from his parents so he concentrated on playing football. In 1949 he went to stay with an aunt in Mikomfwa township and started playing for Mikomfwa Youth Team and by the time he rejoined his parents in Roan township in 1952 and joined Roan Youth Club, he was a promising young player. Two years later, he joined Roan Antelope Amateur Football Club's second team after being recruited by the chairman Joseni Malama, who with Welfare Officer Evans, had started the team.

== Playing career ==
Pensulo got promoted to the first team In 1956 and made his debut soon after when regular players Apple Musengule and Peter Bwembya were away in Lusaka scouting for players. Pensulo and Samuel Yaza were brought in to take their places against Kitwe Tigers and playing on the right wing, Pensulo scored three goals in an 11–1 victory.

On the strength of this showing, Pensulo and Yaza remained in the first team. In 1960, he joined Ndola Black Follies but only spent four months there and was enticed back to Roan by Evans, who offered him a job in the mines as a Welfare Assistant.

1962 saw the formation of the National Football League (NFL) and the two Roan clubs in Luanshya - Pensulo's which was all African and another Roan Antelope for whites were instrumental in pushing for a multi-racial football league. The two teams decided to merge and the new club was called Roan United.

In the first season of the NFL, Pensulo earned the nickname ‘Ginger’ owing to his wing play which resembled that of Nchanga Sports winger Ginger Stevenson who had ginger-coloured hair. In a league match between Roan and Nchanga at Roans’ Kafubu Stadium in April 1962, Pensulo had a great game leading his team to a 4–2 victory. After the game, Roan supporters chanted the name Ginger and bestowed it on Pensulo, in recognition of his performance. His surname was the vernacular of the word pencil so he was also called ‘Ginger Pencil’ by white reporters who covered matches in the early years of the league.

With former Portuguese international Tony Castella as player-coach, who Pensulo later described as ‘the best coach the country ever had,’ Roan won the league championship and the Castle Cup, beating Nchanga Sports 4–3 in the final. They however failed to win the inter-Rhodesia Castle Cup final, losing 1–0 against Bulawayo Rovers in Salisbury. The 1962 triumph remains Roan's only title to date but their style of play won many admirers.

The following year, Roan lost the title, finishing second to Mufulira Wanderers. Castella had been suspended indefinitely for attacking a referee and Wanderers came into their own as the dominant team in the league. Pensulo and club-mate Kenny Banda became the first Zambian players to attend trials with an English side when they travelled to Second division Leeds United in October 1963 for a six-week trial after being spotted by British coaches Ian Greaves and Phil Woosnam who had coached in Northern Rhodesia earlier in the year. The duo were however not signed and they returned home.

Pensulo stopped playing in international and cup competitions in 1968 and restricted himself to league matches. He announced his retirement at the end of the 1970 season, as he felt he was growing old and was stepping back in order to give chance to young players. He later stressed that it was not just that his age that had convinced him to retire from playing but also his religious conviction which had made him quit drinking and refrain from worldly things. Although his work as a youth organizer entailed arranging recreational activities for youths, Pensulo did not like the boxing and wrestling part of it as he felt fighting was against his religion. Newspaper stories of boxers dying in the ring had strengthened his resolve to focus on the word of God and he became a part-time lay preacher with the Seventh-day Adventist Church in Luanshya.

He however returned to the pitch the following year until 1972 when he finally stopped playing. In his time at Roan, he won the league, the Castle Cup, the Challenge Cup and the Heinrich Cup.

== Multi-racial match in 1961 ==
Pensulo grew up and began his career during a time of racial segregation and football not only helped to break racial barriers but also played a vital part in the push for independence. There were parallel leagues for whites and blacks and as the fight for independence gained momentum, proposals were floated for inter-racial matches and one such match saw a multi-racial in which Pensulo was one of the African players invited to feature for the Roan select team against the all-white Mufulira United.

The match took place in Mufulira which was a political hotbed at the time, and was played under maximum security because ANC cadres had planned to disrupt the game. Pensulo had a good game, scoring the only goal of the match to the applause of the predominantly white crowd and afterwards, the Mufulira manager requested him to remain behind for a surprise that turned out to be a large slice of roast pork but he was too shy to eat and ended up taking it home with him. This was one of the matches that led to the formation of a multi-racial NFL in 1962 and independence from Britain followed two years later.

== National team ==
In 1957, Pensulo attended trials and attracted the attention of selectors for the Copperbelt African side, which was a representative of Northern Rhodesia as a whole at the time. He made the team which went to play in Salisbury in Southern Rhodesia. The match against Southern Rhodesia ended in a 3–3 draw with Pensulo scoring a hat-trick. Thereafter, Pensulo became a regular in the Copperbelt African XI which played teams from the Congo, Southern Rhodesia and South Africa.

When the Northern Rhodesia affiliated to FIFA in anticipation of the country's independence, Pensulo was named in the mixed national team that travelled to Malawi for the Ufulu Cup in July 1964 and scored the final goal in the first game against Tanzania, which Northern Rhodesia won 3–0. He also featured strongly in the final game against Malawi, as Jackie Sewell’s hat-trick and Willie Kunda's brace led Northern Rhodesia to the trophy with a 5-0 victory.

Later in October of the same year, he featured for Zambia in the country’s independence tournament where they lost all their games against Kenya and Uganda and a second string Ghanaian side, which proved too strong and easily won the trophy.

In June 1967, while playing against the touring John Charles XI, Pensulo suffered a knee injury, which dogged him throughout the remaining years of his career. It was also during this year that he started getting more involved in the Seventh Day Adventist Church after switching from the Roman Catholic Church.

His last game for Zambia came during a two-match tour of Tanzania in for Saba Saba anniversary matches in July 1967, in which he also served as the coach. He played in both games as Zambia drew the first game 2-2 and lost the second game 2-1.

== Coaching career ==
Two years after the Leeds trip Pensulo had become player-coach besides being captain. In July 1967, Samuel Ndhlovu was unable to travel to Tanzania with the national team so Pensulo was appointed player-coach for the trip and took charge of the team alongside team manager Albert Musakanya. Zambia drew with Tanzania 2-2 and won the second game 2-1.

The following year, Pensulo was named player-manager to assist Ndhlovu when Zambia travelled to play Uganda for the Uganda Independence Cup trophy which Zambia won 3-2. The two teams also played a friendly which was drawn 1-1. Pensulo became full-time Roan coach in 1974, taking over from Willie Chifita and he ended Roan’s silverware drought when they beat Zambia Army 2-1 after extra-time to lift the Challenge Cup. In 1975, Roan lost the Heroes and Unity Cup final 1-0 to Nchanga Rangers after extra-time but won the hearts of soccer fans and the team was nicknamed “Stylish" Roan United.

Pensulo was also a respected goalkeeping coach. He played a role in the development some of the best goalkeepers that have represented Zambia such as Happy Malama, Emmanuel Mwape, Vincent Chileshe, Kenny Mwape, Ghost Mulenga and Richard Mwanza, who all passed through his hands at Roan.

Although he did not win the league title at the helm of Roan, Pensulo won the Independence Cup in 1977. When Dickson Makwaza took over as coach in 1981, Pensulo continued as part of the technical bench until 1986 when he retired from the mines. He moved to 3rd division Zamefa in 1987 but his stay was short-lived as the team disbanded the following year. In 1989, another division 3 side Mine Police of Luanshya enlisted his services and he helped them win promotion to Division II in 1990. However, he was not happy with the management of the team and left soon afterwards.

A year later he was appointed head coach of Division III side Luanshya United and he led a major transformation as the club won promotion from Division II to I between 1991 and 1997. He stepped back after this only to resurface in 2005 when he was appointed Roan's administrative manager with Paul Mulenga as coach and Makwaza as Technical Advisor. The trio oversaw Roan's return to the Super Division in 2007 but Pensulo fell out of favour with the establishment because of his absence from the team on Fridays and Saturdays due to him observing the Sabbath, and was relieved of his duties. Two years later, Luanshya United asked him to help out coach Nicholas Bwalya towards the end of the 2009 season and the team won promotion to Division I in 2011 but got relegated at after one season. Changes in the team's executive saw Pensulo sidelined while and Kalusha Bwalya’s younger brother Joel came in as coach.

== Personal life ==
Pensulo had ten children with his late wife, of which four also passed away.

He started his working career in the mines with the job of lashing underground then became a Welfare Assistant in the Roan African Welfare department. He then became a Youth Organizer for the Mpatamatu Mine township management board in 1971 and later, a Community Development Assistant based at Roan United's home ground Kafubu Stadium, and was a Sports Officer for the mines till his retirement in 1986. His last employer was the Luanshya Municipal Council, where he worked when he coached Luanshya United.

In March 2020, an article which appeared on The Fitted In Project website revealed that Pensulo was living in reduced circumstances. Due to his advanced age, the Zambian legend was in need of proper care and medical treatment but had been neglected.

== Death ==
Pensulo died on 18 April 2021 in Luanshya after complications brought about by old age. He was survived by seven children and 16 grandchildren.
