= Mwape =

Mwape may refer to:

== As surname ==
- Davies Mwape, Zambian footballer
- Emmanuel Mwape, Zambian footballer
- Kenny Mwape, Zambian footballer
- Lupando Mwape, Zambian politician

== As given name ==
- Mwape Mialo, Congolese footballer
- Mwape Miti, Zambian footballer
