= Collins Mbesuma =

Zambian footballer (born 1984)

Personal information
- Full name: Collins Mbesuma
- Date of birth: 3 February 1984 (age 42)
- Place of birth: Luanshya, Zambia
- Height: 1.83 m (6 ft 0 in)
- Position: Striker

Team information
- Current team: Pretoria Callies

Youth career
- 2001–2002: Wild Antelopes

Senior career*
Years	Team	Apps	(Gls)
2003–2004	Roan United	25	(11)
2004–2005	Kaizer Chiefs	33	(35)
2005–2007	Portsmouth	4	(0)
2006–2007	→ Maritimo (loan)	23	(7)
2007–2008	Bursaspor	6	(0)
2008–2009	Mamelodi Sundowns	16	(4)
2009–2010	Moroka Swallows	14	(2)
2010–2012	Golden Arrows	43	(18)
2012–2014	Orlando Pirates	13	(4)
2014–2016	Mpumalanga Black Aces	58	(20)
2016–2018	Highlands Park	15	(4)
2018–2019	Maccabi FC	28	(10)
2019–2021	University of Pretoria	51	(15)
2021–	Pretoria Callies		

International career^{‡}
2003–2017	Zambia	65	(22)
Medal record
Men's football
Representing Zambia
Africa Cup of Nations
Winner	2012 Equatorial Guinea-Gabon
- * Club domestic league appearances and goals as of 00:33, 30 August 2020 (UTC) ‡ National team caps and goals as of 10 June 2017

Collins Mbesuma (born 3 February 1984) is a Zambian professional footballer who plays for South African club Pretoria Callies. He is nicknamed The Hurricane or Ntofontofo.

== Club career ==
Mbesuma was born in Luanshya. His father, Francis Kajiya, was also a football player who played as a midfielder for Zambian clubs; Green Buffaloes FC and Ndola United FC as well as the country's national team from the late 1970s to the early 1980s.

The surname "Mbesuma" is adopted from his step father who raised him as he was not brought up by his biological father Kajiya.

Mbesuma made his debut for Zambia in 2003 and had won four caps by the end of that year, while at the same time being a key member of Zambia's under-23 side that almost qualified for the Athens Olympics.

His performances for the Olympic team caught the attention of Kaizer Chiefs who bought him in January from Roan United in Zambia, where he averaged a goal every other game.

He scored on his debut in South Africa's Premier Soccer League in 2004 against the Black Leopards but injured himself in the process and spent several weeks on the sidelines.

Mbesuma was named PSL Player of the Season in 2005 after scoring a sensational 35 goals in one season with Kaizer Chiefs. After such an achievement a move to a more prestigious league looked assured, and indeed it was enough to catch the eye of Sam Allardyce, manager of Bolton Wanderers (Le Mans UC72 looked to sign him but administrative problems didn't allow Mbesuma to join France). However, Mbesuma was reluctant to take a trial at the club, feeling his quality was already proven, and so this allowed then-Portsmouth manager Alain Perrin to snap him up on a three-year contract in the summer of 2005. Work permit problems due to the low ranking of his country meant he was not given clearance to join the club until late into pre-season.

It was noted that he appeared overweight early in the season when playing for the reserve team. Mbesuma never started a match for Portsmouth; he only came on for a total of four brief substitute appearances, all in the first half of the 2005–06 season. In July 2006, he began a season long loan with CS Marítimo where he appeared to be regaining his form – netting in vital goals early in the season and receiving the Swan d'Or, an auspicious monthly Portuguese football award. However his form soon dipped and his goal tally climaxed at a total of just seven goals. He returned to Portsmouth in June 2007 after playing 23 games for the Portuguese team.

His transfer from Kaizer Chiefs to Portsmouth in August 2005 is one of those about which the Stevens inquiry report in June 2007 expressed concerns, because of the involvement of agent Willie McKay.

On 4 August 2007, it was announced that Bursaspor signed Mbesuma for an undisclosed amount.

On 17 September 2007, Mbesuma was fined 5000 Euros by Bursaspor for failing to return on time to his Turkish base after helping Zambia to beat South Africa in an African Cup of Nations qualifier. This kind of behaviour by Mbesuma was condemned and described as irresponsible by the Zambian FA (FAZ). Mbesuma has a long-standing reputation of poor timekeeping. This problem dates back to his time at Zambian outfit Roan United. In January 2008, Mbesuma was left off the Zambian national squad at the 2008 African Cup of Nations after being declared unfit. On 23 May 2008, Mbesuma mutually terminated his contract with Bursaspor and signed with Mamelodi Sundowns. After an unimpressive stints at Mamelodi Sundowns and then Moroka Swallows FC his contract was terminated at the end of the June 2010. After being clubless for several months he joined Golden Arrows on 20 December 2010 for a six-month deal. He scored his first goals (a brace) against Amazulu on 16 January 2011.

On 16 August 2012, Mbesuma joined Orlando Pirates on a three-year contract, but in July 2014 moved to Mpumalanga Black Aces.

In September 2016, he became only the fifth player in the PSL-era to score 100 league goals.

== Career statistics ==
Scores and results list Zambia's goal tally first.

No	Date	Venue	Opponent	Score	Result	Competition
1.	27 July 2003	Independence Stadium, Lusaka, Zambia	Mozambique	4–2	4–2	2003 COSAFA Cup
2.	10 October 2004	Stade Alphonse Massemba-Débat, Brazzaville, Congo	Congo	1–0	3–2	2006 FIFA World Cup qualification
3.	10 October 2004	Stade Alphonse Massemba-Débat, Brazzaville, Congo	Congo	2–0	3–2	2006 FIFA World Cup qualification
4.	10 October 2004	Stade Alphonse Massemba-Débat, Brazzaville, Congo	Congo	3–0	3–2	2006 FIFA World Cup qualification
5.	26 March 2005	Konkola Stadium, Chililabombwe, Zambia	Congo	2–0	2–0	2006 FIFA World Cup qualification
6.	18 June 2005	Konkola Stadium, Chililabombwe, Zambia	Mali	2–1	2–1	2006 FIFA World Cup qualification
7.	11 July 2005	Independence Stadium, Lusaka, Zambia	Swaziland	1–0	3–0	2005 COSAFA Cup
8.	11 July 2005	Independence Stadium, Lusaka, Zambia	Swaziland	2–0	3–0	2005 COSAFA Cup
9.	12 June 2015	Independence Stadium, Lusaka, Zambia	Malawi	1–1	3–3	2005 CECAFA Cup
10.	12 June 2015	Independence Stadium, Lusaka, Zambia	Malawi	2–1	3–3	2005 CECAFA Cup
11.	16 June 2007	Konkola Stadium, Chililabombwe, Zambia	Chad	1–1	1–1	2008 Africa Cup of Nations qualification
12.	28 December 2009	Arthur Block Park, Johannesburg, South Africa	Mozambique	1–0	1–0	Friendly
13.	9 February 2011	Mavuso Sports Centre, Manzini, Swaziland	Swaziland	2–0	4–0	Friendly
14.	4 June 2011	Nkoloma Stadium, Lusaka, Zambia	Mozambique	3–0	3–0	2012 Africa Cup of Nations qualification
15.	14 November 2012	FNB Stadium, Johannesburg, South Africa	South Africa	1–0	1–0	Friendly
16.	21 January 2013	Mbombela Stadium, Nelspruit, South Africa	Ethiopia	1–0	1–1	2013 Africa Cup of Nations
17.	24 March 2013	Setsoto Stadium, Maseru, Lesotho	Lesotho	1–0	1–1	2014 FIFA World Cup qualification
18.	8 June 2013	Levy Mwanawasa Stadium, Ndola, Zambia	Lesotho	4–0	4–0	2014 FIFA World Cup qualification
19.	6 September 2015	Nyayo National Stadium, Nairobi, Kenya	Kenya	2–1	2–1	2017 Africa Cup of Nations qualification
20.	4 June 2016	Estádio 24 de Setembro, Bissau, Guinea-Bissau	Guinea-Bissau	1–1	2–3	2017 Africa Cup of Nations qualification
21.	9 October 2016	Levy Mwanawasa Stadium, Ndola, Zambia	Nigeria	1–2	1–2	2018 FIFA World Cup qualification
22.	12 November 2016	Limbe Stadium, Limbe, Cameroon	Cameroon	1–0	1–1	2018 FIFA World Cup qualification

== Honours ==
Kaizer Chiefs

- Premiership: 2004–05
- Coca-Cola Cup: 2004–05
- Macufe Cup: 2005

CS Marítimo

- AF Madeira Cup: 2006–07

Mamelodi Sundowns

- Nedbank Cup: 2007–08

Moroka Swallows

- Nedbank Cup: 2008–09

Zambia

- Africa Cup of Nations: 2012

Individual

- PSL Player of the Season: 2005
- Lesley Manyathela Golden Boot: 2005, 2016
