= Boniface Simutowe =

Zambian footballer and coach (1949-2014)

Personal information
- Date of birth: 13 October 1949
- Place of birth: Luanshya, Northern Rhodesia
- Date of death: 23 December 2014 (aged 65)
- Height: 5 ft 5 in (1.65 m)
- Position: Midfielder

Youth career
- 1958–1965: Roan Youth Team

Senior career*
Years	Team	Apps	(Gls)
1966	Roan United		
1967–1975	Broken Hill Warriors		
1975–1979	Red Arrows		

International career
1967–1978	Zambia	68	(15)

Managerial career
- 1975–1986: Red Arrows
- 1989–2005: Profund Warriors
- * Club domestic league appearances and goals

Boniface Simutowe (13 October 1949 – 23 December 2014) was one of Zambia's greatest midfielders who also had a long career as a coach. Nicknamed 'Chest Master,' he was the first footballer to be named Zambian Footballer of the Year and Sportsman of the Year in the same season and was part of the great Kabwe Warriors side that swept all the silverware on offer in 1972. He later took to coaching and was involved with the national team for several years.

== Early years ==
Simutowe was born in Luanshya where his father Kenan was a miner. He was the second born in a family of 12, eight of whom were boys who all played soccer. He grew up in Roan Township and went to Makoma Primary School after which he began his career under Bennie Evans' Roan Youth Team in 1958 along with future Zambian internationals Sandy Kaposa, Happy Malama and Henry Kasongo. Simutowe made his debut for Roan while he was still a schoolboy at Roan Trust School in 1966, and he played regularly alongside players like Ginger Pensulo, Fordson Kabole, Emmanuel Mwape, Ken Banda and Kaposa.

== Playing career ==
Simutowe won his first piece of silverware at the age of 17 when Roan beat Rokana United 2–1 to win the Heinrich Cup before being lured to Broken Hill Warriors (now Kabwe Warriors together with Kaposa by his cousin, former Roan player Dyson Mugala in January 1967. Simutowe's and Kaposa's move to Broken Hill was controversial with Roan reporting Warriors to the Zambian National Football League (NFL) for featuring the two in a friendly match against City of Lusaka in January 1967 despite them still being on the books of Roan who contended that the duo had signed professional contracts which would only expire after the 1968 season. Warriors' response was that Simutowe and Kaposa were amateurs who only required club clearances. Roan were not prepared to release the duo and warned that if Simutowe was admitted to the Broken Hill Railways (Warriors' sponsors) School as a trainee, he would either travel to Luanshya for NFL fixtures or 'watch the game from the touchline.' When all attempts to persuade the duo to return to Luanshya failed, Roan agreed to a double transfer for a reported of only £100 each which would prove to be the most astute signing by Warriors and was called their transfer deal of the decade.

At Warriors, Simutowe came into his own, cementing a regular place despite still being a teenager. He won the Castle Cup with Warriors that same year with a 1–0 victory over his former club. The following season, Warriors won the league title for the first time in their history. Simutowe, who was constantly in trouble with referees played primarily as a midfielder but he could play all forward positions.

Although Warriors lost their crown to Mufulira Wanderers the following year, Simutowe had an outstanding season, finishing third on the scoring charts with 53 goals, 1 behind club-mate Kaposa and 11 behind top scorer Robertson Zulu of Wanderers. He was rewarded with the footballer of the year award and became the youngest man to lift the trophy, two months past his 20th birthday. This record would stand for 17 years until Johnson Bwalya won the award in 1986 aged 19.

Simutowe also won the Sportsman of the Year award, the second footballer to do so after Samuel 'Zoom' Ndhlovu. The announcement that he had won stunned the young midfielder who disclosed that he never imagined he would win the award, and that he had learned from his mistakes in the past so he had stopped making trouble on the advice of soccer fans and officials who advised him against wrecking a promising career.

The following season, Warriors regained the league title and added the Challenge Cup to their trophy cabinet. Simutowe ended the season with 55 goals and was runner-up to Kaposa who scored 58. Warriors would go on to scoop two more league titles on the trot, including the fantastic 1972 season when they swept all the silverware on offer.

Simutowe played a key role in luring Godfrey Chitalu to Warriors in 1971 and in January 1973 he experienced barbarianism in football when Warriors travelled to Madagascar for an African Club Champions Cup second leg tie against Fortier Majunga at the National Stadium in Antananrivo. Warriors were leading 4–1 from the first leg in that was played in Lusaka and had just scored the fourth goal for an 8–1 aggregate lead when the hostile crowd turned on them and showered them with all sorts of missiles and Simutowe got hit on the head in a hail of stones. He still bears the scars of that attack to this day, hence the ever-present hat that he spots.

Later that year, Warriors surrendered their league title to Zambia Army (now Green Buffaloes) and at the beginning of the 1975 season, Simutowe walked out on Warriors, got a job in Luanshya and announced that he would be rejoining his former club Roan United. He then changed his mind and decided to join Division II side Zambia Air Force (now Red Arrows) although it was not a straightforward move as Warriors demanded a transfer fee of K8,000, which was double the record fee of K4,000 which Rhokana United had paid Mufulira Wanderers for Bernard Chanda the previous season. As Arrows did not believe in paying a transfer fee for a player who wanted to leave, this wrangle would keep Simutowe out of action until August when it was resolved and in the meantime, he played for and coached amateur side Buseko FC. It was during this time that he came across goalkeeper Ghost Mulenga, striker Peter Kaira, defender Sales Mwangula and winger System Chilongo whom he later took to Arrows when his move was finalised, which turned out to be a free transfer. At the end of the season, Warriors finished second bottom and were only saved from demotion when the number of teams in the division were increased.

Simutowe set about transforming Arrows into a formidable outfit as player-coach. The skilful and experienced midfielder also used trickery to gain an advantage. At times, he would pull down the opposing goalkeeper's shorts during a corner enabling his team to score, and he would also con unsuspecting defenders into believing the referee had blown the whistle and the poor opponent would pick up the ball in the box only to give away a penalty.

Nicknamed "Chitapochimo" (meaning 'do something') and "Fu Manchu" after the wise emperor in the early seventies movie The Castle of Fu Manchu, Simutowe continued his top drawer performances, and once scored 9 goals when Arrows beat FAZ Division II side Luanshya United 16–0 in a cup match in 1976. He played on until 1979 when he quit playing to concentrate on coaching.

== National team ==
Simutowe was only 17 when he played for Zambia against the John Charles XI in June 1967 which Zambia lost 2–1 in his home town Luanshya. He made his full international debut against Tanzania in a friendly in Dar es Salaam and he scored Zambia's first goal in a 2–2 draw.

Simutowe who usually played as a deep lying midfielder but could play all forward positions was one of the longest serving Zambian players. He was on the score-sheet when Zambia beat Ethiopia 4–2 in a World cup qualifier in Lusaka in February 1973 and he helped Zambia qualify to their first ever CAN tournament. He played all the games at CAN 1974 where Zambia finished as runners-up.

In 1976, Simutowe captained Zambia in 3–1 friendly loss to Nigeria in Chingola and the following year, he played for Zambia against Uganda in a World cup qualifier in Kampala. Upon their return, he left camp without permission and was consequently dropped from the squad and suspended from all football related activities for three months. In July that same year, Simutowe once again skipped camp when Zambia was preparing for a World Cup qualifier against Egypt after which he wrote to the Football Association of Zambia (FAZ) and asked them not to consider him for national team selection but the FAZ disciplinary committee suspended him for one year. On appeal, the FAZ executive committee threw out his appeal and doubled the suspension period due to his previous discpilnary record.

As a consequence, he missed Zambia's trip to CAN 1978 in Ghana though he was fortunate to have his suspension lifted and he returned to the national team in June though he got a red card on his comeback, a 0–0 draw with Malawi in Lusaka. His last game for Zambia came at that year's CECAFA tournament where Zambia lost the final to Malawi 3–2.

== Coaching career ==
Simutowe began coaching at an early age when he assisted Warriors coach Lasky Mwandu and was made player-coach in 1969. He quit playing to focus on coaching in 1979 though he still continued to have tiffs with referees. He continued in this role at Arrows and attended a 6-month coaching course in Bonn, West Germany. With Arrows, he won the Heroes & Unity and Cup in 1977, 1979 and 1981 and BP Challenge Cup in 1982 and the Champion of Champions Cup in 1983.

His long involvement with the national team began in 1982 when he was named assistant to Brightwell Banda at CAN 1982 where Zambia finished third. He was also part of the coaching bench when Zambia won their maiden CECAFA trophy in 1984.

In 1986, Arrows went on a poor run and at the half-way stage, were rooted to the bottom of the 12 team table with 7 points from 11 matches, a situation which saw their fans riot in protest. The team's executive acted swiftly by appointing Patrick Phiri as player-coach, replacing Simutowe who was transferred to Livingstone by the Air Force but as fate would have it, the newly promoted Super Division Profund Warriors asked for his services so he quit the Air force and took over the reins at Profund.

Simutowe's Profund career was initially bumpy as the team was relegated to Division I but he quickly re-organised the team and they bounced back after a season. In 1992, Profund had a storming season and finished third in the league, their best ever position.

He also served as assistant to Samuel 'Zoom' Ndhlovu and when Ndhlovu resigned in 1992, Simutowe took over the reins with Jochen Figge as Technical Advisor. When Zambia struggled to defeat Mauritius 2–1 in a CAN qualifier, Figge surprisingly resigned and simply said he was a professional who did not want to be associated with 'suspicious activities' in camp. Simutowe soldiered on and led Zambia to a 1–0 over South Africa in another CAN qualifier in Johannesburg, but the performances in the two matches saw the return of Ndhlovu as coach and Simutowe reverted to his former role. The duo were however dismissed when Zambia failed to beat Madagascar in a World Cup qualifier in December 1992 so he was not with the team that perished in the Gabon Air Disaster of April 1993. He was however one of the coaches appointed to constitute a new team after the crash.

Simutowe was also a goalkeeping coach and he served as assistant under Roald Poulsen as well. He also took charge of Zambia's U-17 team in 1997. He coached Profund Warriors up until 2005 when management sidelined him for a younger coach.

In 2010, Simutowe advised Zambian clubs to be patient with their clubs which he said had been infiltrated by politicians and supporters who had 'never kicked a ball in their lives.

== Personal life ==
Simutowe was married to Grace Daka with whom he had 6 children. Boniface Junior played for Profund Warriors while Aaron played as a left-back for Zanaco, the Zambia U-20 national team and later played professional soccer in the United States. Boyd and Hope also played but did not reach their father's heights. Simutowe's brother Levy played for Ndola United while his nephew is chess Grandmaster Amon Simutowe. On 23 December 2014, zambianfootball.co.zm reported that Simutowe had died.

== Honours ==
=== As player ===
- Zambian League Title: 1968, 1970, 1971 and 1972
- Charity Shield: 1967 and 1968
- Castle Cup/Independence Cup: 1967, 1969, 1972
- Zambian Challenge Cup: 1970, 1972
- Heinrich Cup/Chibuku Cup: 1971, 1972, 1977, 1979
- Jamhuri Cup: 1967 in Kenya
- Heroes Cup:1968 against Uganda
- Uganda Independence Cup: 1968
- Independence Cup: 1968 against Tanzania
- Peter Stuyvesant Trophy:1969 (3 match series with Malawi)
- BAT Independence Trophy: 1969 (3 match series with Daring Falcons of Congo DR)

Individual

- Zambian Footballer of the Year: 1969
- Zambian Sportsman of the Year: 1969

=== As coach ===
- Zambian Challenge Cup (Shell Challenge Cup/BP Challenge Cup/ BP Top Eight Cup): 1982
- Champion of Champions Cup: 1983
