= Chileshe =

Chileshe is a Zambian name. Notable people with this sname include:

- Chileshe Kapwepwe, Zambian politician
- Jack Chileshe (born 1983), Zambian football player
- Lwamba Chileshe (born 1999), Zambian-born New Zealand squash player
- Rhoda Chileshe (born 1998), Zambian football player
- Temwa Chileshe (born 2000), New Zealand squash player
- Vincent Chileshe, Zambian football player
