= Emment Kapengwe =

Zambian footballer (1943-1988)

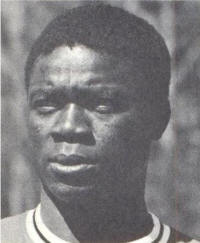

Personal information
- Date of birth: 27 April 1943
- Place of birth: Broken Hill, Northern Rhodesia
- Date of death: 17 September 1988 (aged 45)
- Place of death: Lusaka, Zambia
- Position: Midfielder

Senior career*
Years	Team	Apps	(Gls)
1957–1962	Kitwe Boma Tigers		
1963	Kitwe Lions		
1963–1966	Kitwe United		
1967–1969	Atlanta Chiefs	48	(16)
1969–1970	Aston Villa	3	(0)
1970–1972	Kitwe United		
1973	City of Lusaka		
1973	Atlanta Apollos	13	(0)
1973–1976	City of Lusaka		

International career
1963–1972	Zambia	42	(15)

Managerial career
- 1975–1976: City of Lusaka
- * Club domestic league appearances and goals

Emment Kapengwe (27 April 1943 – 17 September 1988) was one of Zambia's leading footballers in the '60s and he represented the country at independence in October 1964. He was Kitwe United's key player and among the first Zambians to play professional football abroad when he was signed by Atlanta Chiefs in the United States of America in 1967 together with Howard Mwikuta and Freddie Mwila. Two years later, he became the first Zambian to play for English club when he moved to Aston Villa together with Mwila.

== Early years ==
Kapengwe was born in Broken Hill in 1943. He lost his father at an early age but his mother got married again to Mr. Njalili Kapengwe whose surname young Emment adopted. He first went to the Catholic School in Broken Hill from 1949 to 1951 and when his father joined the mines on the Copperbelt, the family moved to Kitwe where he got interested in football and like many of Zambia's soccer stars, learned the game the hard way. Due to lack of facilities, Kapengwe and his friends used to play on a bare ground at Bwafwano community centre in Kamitondo Township with tennis balls and home-made footballs. In 1956, his father was transferred to Bancroft (Chililabombwe) and so began Kapengwe's induction in organised sport.

== Club career ==
Kapengwe first played in goal for amateur side Kitwe Boma Tigers in 1957 together with some great names of that time such as Protasio Makofi and Adriano Musa. At the same time, he did a bit of boxing at Chililabombwe Welfare Hall but he soon settled on football as his hobby. He featured prominently for Tigers and alternated between the goal and the right wing, gaining vast experience by playing with, and against players like Samuel 'Zoom' Ndhlovu, Willie Chifita and Ginger Pensulo. Of all these, Kapengwe idolised Pensulo and would always try to imitate his style.

He absorbed all he saw while in action and developed into such a good footballer that he was soon at the centre of a tug-of-war between two Kitwe clubs: the Tigers and the Lions. Kapengwe was keen on joining Lions as they were paying £1 for a game win or lose. The issue was finally settled when the Senior Community Development Officer for Kitwe Municipal Council intervened saying she saw no reason for him to join the Lions if it would help him earn a living.

Unfortunately for Kapengwe, Lions paid him only a few pounds before they were dissolved. He joined them in January 1963 and a month later with the formation of the Zambian National Football League, the team merged with Tigers to form Kitwe United. He went straight into the first team where he was one of the youngest players though by this time, he had grown into a big lad with a lethal shot. Standing at 1.95m tall, he was a gentle and intelligent player and as United's key player and captain, his loyalty was never in question, his prime concern being to develop the club into a formidable team. And when a young Godfrey Chitalu joined United in 1965, it was Kapengwe who encouraged him to take up football as a career.

In 1966, Kapengwe, Freddie Mwila of Rhokana United and Howard Mwikuta from Kabwe Warriors were picked by English football coach Phil Woosnam for Atlanta Chiefs of the American Professional Soccer League of which Woosnam was team manager. However, the trip met with several hitches before the three players finally flew out the following year.

After trials involving a total of 40 players from all over the world, the three made the cut and soon made headlines with their impressive performances for the Chiefs. Kapengwe points to America as one place where he made his biggest contribution to football. There were only five men from the "dark continent": Kapengwe, Mwila, Mwikuta, Willy Evans of Ghana and South African Kaizer Motaung who incidentally, underwent his trial by featuring for Mufulira Blackpool in Zambia. These were the only Africans in the North American Soccer League in 1967. Apart from playing, they conducted clinics in colleges, universities and the communities, the theme being to make Americans play football.

Chiefs finished the season in 5th place during that season but won the NASL championship in the next season. In his first year in the States, Kapengwe was voted the second most active player in the league, a special prize for the player who remained on his toes all the time during the season. He also made the NASL All-Star First Team in 1967 and 1968.

Kapengwe enjoyed his stay in the States and his most memorable moment was when Chiefs played against Brazil's top club Santos who featured the great Pelé in August 1968. Chiefs scored a goal after 19 seconds to stun Santos as described by Kapengwe: "We won the toss and our captain Vic chose the kick-off. Our number nine put the ball to Fred who flicked it back to Vic at four. Then Vic passed a long ball to me on the Santos goal mouth. I fed the ball back to Fred who blasted home the opener under a minute. Santos had never been scored like that before and they cheered for us." However, Chiefs got carried away by the early goal and lost 6–2 after a Pelé hat-trick.

Another important game for Kapengwe came earlier that year in June. Chiefs famously beat Manchester City twice after the English Division I side's Manager Malcolm Allison described the local talent as "fourth division" standard. Kapengwe contributed a goal in their 3–2 victory in the first match with Mwila scoring the other two, who also scored a goal in the next game, a 2–1 victory.

Kapengwe points at another Brazilian player called Vavá as someone who changed his approach to football. He made an impression with his style and tactics and was admired by everyone at the club.

At the end of the 1969 season, Kapengwe quit Chiefs who had by then changed their name to the Atlanta Apollos because of a switch in management following losses due to the unpopularity of the game in its infancy in the country. Kapengwe and Mwila were lured to English Division II side Aston Villa under Tommy Docherty who had noticed the duo when Chiefs played Villa during the 1968 season and signed them on two-year deals. At Villa, who were battling for survival at the bottom of the division II table, they met an energetic central defender called Brian Tiler who would later coach Zambia.

After a spell in the reserves, Kapengwe's first match for the first team was against Carlisle United which Villa won 1–0. He became the first African to play for Villa and his debut in English soccer attracted major interest among British newspapers with Denis Shaw writing in one of London's newspapers stating: "In nearly 30 years of watching football I have never seen a player make such an impact in his first football league appearance. He showed more natural talent than any other player on the field and remember he was in the company of Bruce Rioch who cost a six-figure fee."

In the end, it was not much of an impact as Kapengwe made only three league appearances. His spell in England was short-lived as Villa were demoted to the third division at the end of the 1969–70 season. Docherty called Kapengwe and Mwila aside and said "Look, I am going away elsewhere but if you want to stay, you are at liberty to do so." The two however decided to head back to Zambia as their cause was not helped by the weather conditions and the racial tension.

Kapengwe returned home in 1970 to impart the knowledge he had acquired abroad at Kitwe United. He had attended a two-week coaching course in Lilleshall coaching school with Mwila and his contribution to the building of Kitwe United was soon realised when United beat Kabwe Warriors 1–0 to win the 1971 Challenge Cup.

Kapengwe was the heart and soul of United and his philosophy as player-coach was to fashion the team into an attacking force and it paid off as Kitwe consistently remained at the top of the league for most part of the season and scooped the Challenge Cup. He became known as 'Father Kitwe United' as he was the only player who was in the original team in 1963. In 1973, he decided on a move and picked on Lusaka for his new home. He had several offers from teams in the capital including Green Buffaloes but he settled for City of Lusaka F.C. He had only played 13 games for City when he flew out to America again.

Atlanta Apollos offered Kapengwe an attractive contract but City of Lusaka stood in his way, demanding $20,000 as a condition for giving him an international release. The US club offered to sponsor him on a six-month coaching course in Britain at the end of the season which he explained to City would be of great benefit in the future but they would not budge. So he came back and though City officials smiled at him, showing him 'their beautiful teeth,' he was bitter.

When he left for the United States, City had nine points on the league table. On his return in August, he found them still stuck there. In his own modest way, he strived hard and brought a spirit of new determination to the team. City survived relegation as a result and ended the season with 22 points.

Despite the big disappointment with city, Kapengwe remained with the club until the middle of the 1976 season when he quietly fizzled out of the limelight without word. In his last days with the club, he was training the team and it was mainly due to frustration in this capacity which finally forced him out and he lost interest in soccer.

== International career ==
Kapengwe hit the soccer limelight in 1963 when his club picked him to play against a visiting Southern Rhodesian side Magula FC. He played so well that he caught the eye of national team selectors. He was part of the national team that travelled to Lubumbashi in the Congo later that year, drawing the first game with the hosts 2–2. The following day, he was told he would replace his hero Pensulo at outside right in the game against Congo Brazzaville and though he had no confidence at first, he scored on his international debut for Northern Rhodesia with a thunderous strike from somewhere near the centre-line. As he was much younger and more active than Pensulo, he left no doubt that he was a sure-fit for the national team. He was used primarily as a right winger but at times played at inside-left.

Kapengwe was in the team that played against Tanzania and Malawi in July 1964 and when Zambia attained independence in 1964, he was one of the first players to wear the Zambian colours. He represented Zambia against Uganda, Kenya and Ghana in the disastrous independence celebration tournament where Zambia lost all of their three matches.

For a winger, Kapengwe was regularly on the score-sheet, scoring twice in an 8–2 victory over Kenya when Zambia won the Republic Cup in Nairobi in December 1964, two in the Malawi Republic Cup in 1966 and four more during the Kenyan Jamhuri Cup series a year later. He was recalled from Atlanta in October 1968 and he scored twice over two legs when Zambia were eliminated from the World Cup race by Sudan.

With the national team, he won the Mufulu Cup and the Kenya Republic Cup in 1964, the 1966 Rothmans and Malawi Republic trophies and the Jamhuri Cup in 1967 against Kenya. His last match for Zambia came in a goalless draw with Lesotho in April 1972 in a World Cup qualifier in Maseru. From July 1964 he made over 40 appearances for Zambia and scored 15 goals.

== Personal life ==
When he was not on the pitch, Kapengwe spent most of his time with his wife Alice and their five children. His job as a Recreational Officer for Kitwe City Council gave him wide opportunities to train and coach future soccer Zambian internationals. Although Kapengwe would return to Zambia for holidays between seasons, his three years in Atlanta cost him his first wife who could not endure his long absences from home.

== Death ==
Kapengwe died on 17 September 1988 in Lusaka after suffering from a stroke.
