= Ben Mwanza =

Zambian footballer (born 1984)

Personal information
- Date of birth: 22 May 1984 (age 42)
- Place of birth: Luanshya, Zambia
- Position: Forward

Senior career*
Years	Team	Apps	(Gls)
2003–2011	Roan United F.C.		
2012	Konkola Blades F.C.		
2013–2015	Roan United F.C.		

International career
2005–2007	Zambia	5	(0)
- * Club domestic league appearances and goals

Ben Mwanza (born 22 May 1984) is a retired Zambian football striker.
