= Ntokozo =

- Gender: Unisex
- Language: Nguni languages

Other gender
- Feminine: Nontokozo

Other names
- Variant forms: Thokozile, Thokozani, Mthokozisi

Ntokozo is a given name meaning "joy." Notable people with the name include:

- Ntokozo Hlonyana, South African politician
- Ntokozo Mbambo (born 1985), South African musician
- Ntokozo Mbuli, South African presenter
- Ntokozo Mdluli (born 1980), South African musician
- Ntokozo Qwabe (born 1991), South African student activist
- Ntokozo Sikhakhane (born 1983), South African soccer player
