= Fiwale Hill =

Landmark in Zambia

- Location within Zambia

Highest point
- Coordinates: 14°00′S 28°00′E

Geography
- Location: Central Province, Zambia

Fiwale Hill is a distinctive hill located in Zambia, notable as a geographical landmark and the namesake for significant community infrastructure, including Fiwale Hill Hospital, Fiwale Hill School, and Fiwale Hill Church.

== Current infrastructure and facilities ==
The area immediately surrounding Fiwale Hill is home to community facilities that serve the local population.

=== Fiwale Hill Hospital ===
The Fiwale Hill Hospital see in the photo was built in 1954 by Harold Creasey. The hospital then developed into the Fiwale Hill Leprosy Settlement, which officially opened in 1956. By 1960, it had become the primary facility for the treatment of all leprosy patients in Zambia. A training course for leprosy control officers was also opened at Fiwale Hill in 1963. Today, the hospital provides for services for the residents of and surrounding communities. The hospital provides access to medical attention (e.g. general healthcare, maternal and child health services, outpatient care, emergency services, etc.) in the region.

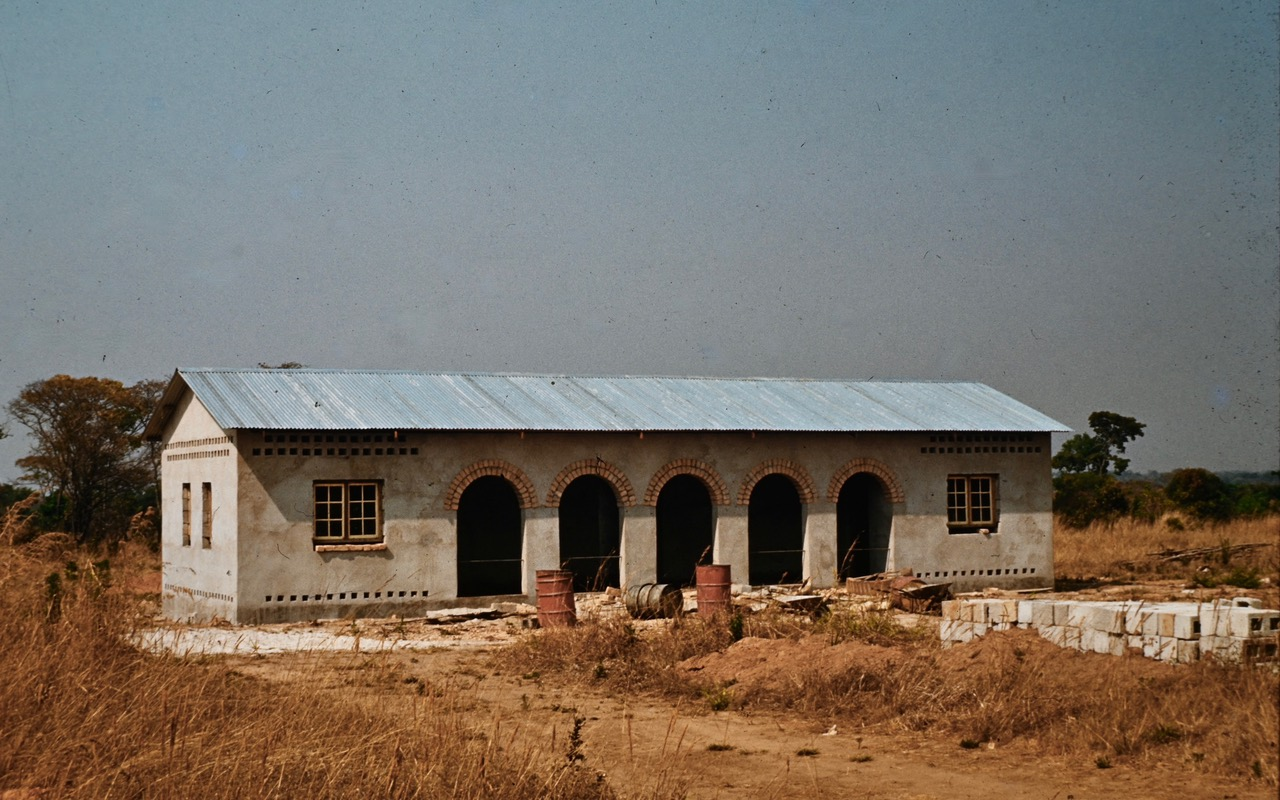
Fiwale Hill Hospital Zambia

=== Fiwale Hill School ===
Adjacent to the hospital is the Fiwale Hill School, an educational institution that caters to the local youth. The school, which opened in 1958, provided primary education and by 1963 had 200 pupils. Currently, the school provides for students from Fiwale Hill and surrounding villages.

=== Fiwale Hill Church ===
The Fiwale Hill Church serves as the spiritual center of the Fiwale Hill Mission. Established as part of the initial mission station in 1954, it has been instrumental in the religious life of the community. Notably, the church incorporates Norman architecture elements, including its distinctive rounded arches, which are a characteristic feature of this style of construction, as seen in structures like St Swithun's Church, Nately Scures in England. The use of such arches in building provides structural support and allows for wide, durable openings, contributing to the church's stability and design. The church has historically played a significant role in training and equipping local church leaders and evangelists, working alongside resident missionaries.

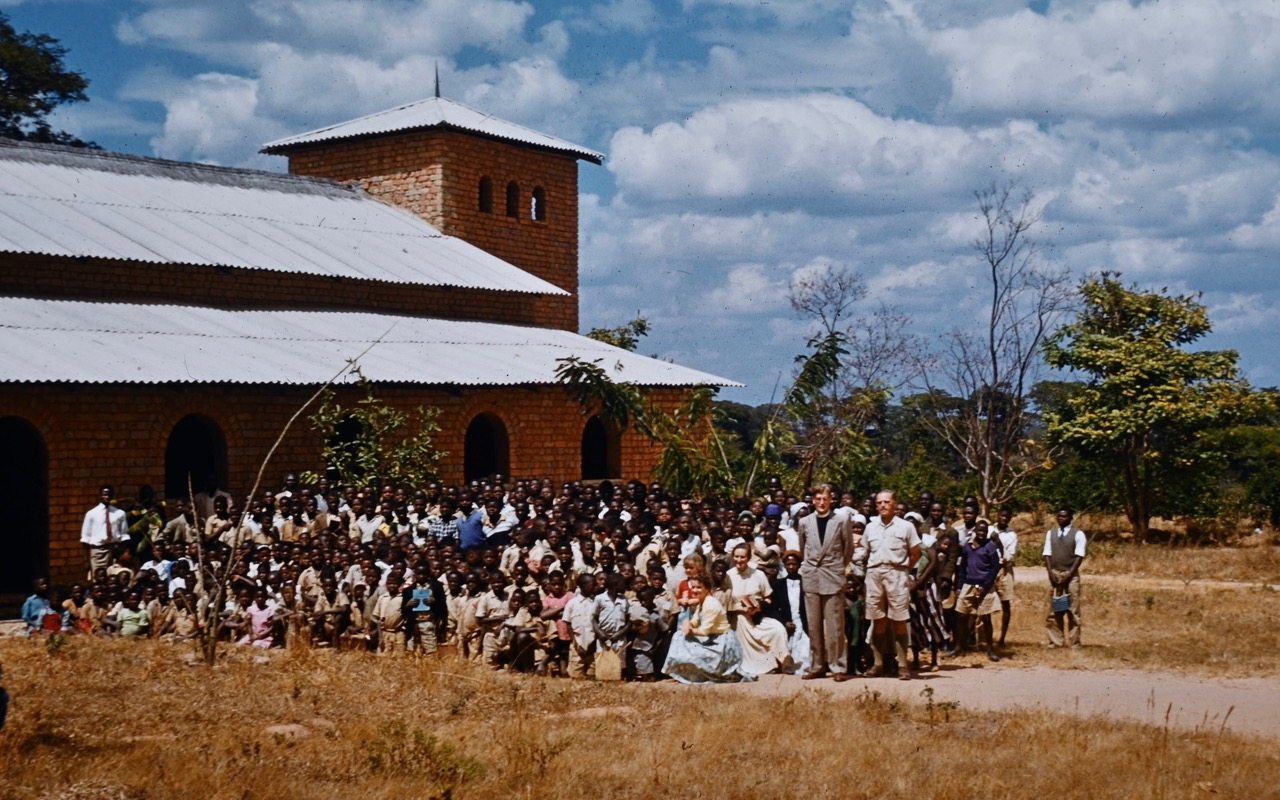
Fiwali Hill Church Zambia

== History and development ==
The development of Fiwale Hill as a center for community services was advanced in 1954, when the Baptist Missionary Society (BMS) agreed to support the mission station there. This initiative was intended as a rural centre for leprosy work, general medical services, and education. The subsequent infrastructure development of the mission was led by Harold Creasey, a London businessman with considerable engineering skills. During the 13 years Creasey lived at Fiwale Hill, he continued to campaign in Britain for the development of Fiwale Hill in what was then Northern Rhodesia.

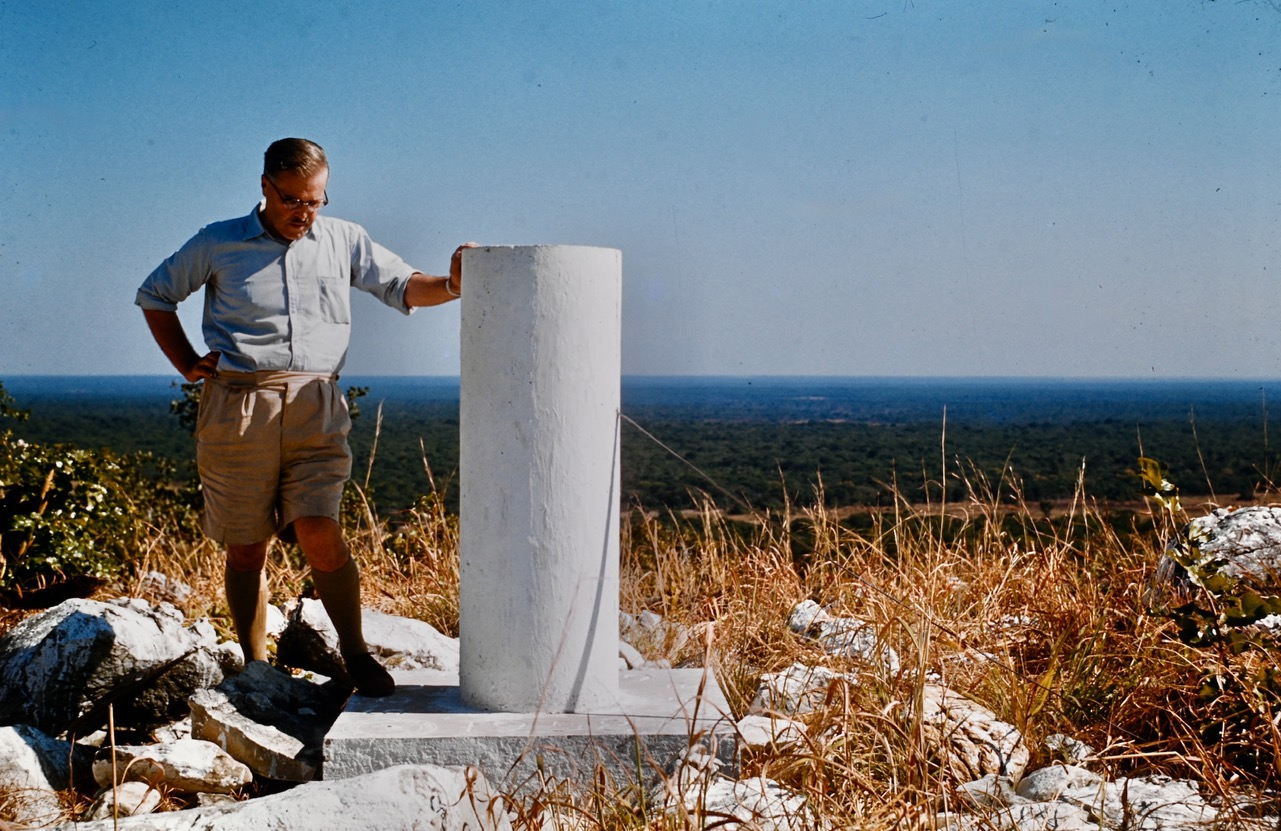
Fiwali Hill Marker Zambia

== Notable people from Fiwale Hill ==
Fiwale Hill and its surrounding area have been associated with individuals who have achieved broader recognition.

One such figure is Howard Mwikuta (1941–2022), a prominent Zambian international footballer and coach. Mwikuta, born near Fiwale Hill in 1941, went on to have a distinguished career playing for the Zambia national team and notable clubs such as Mufulira Wanderers F.C. in Zambia and the Atlanta Chiefs in the North American Soccer League (NASL) in the United States. Following his playing career, he transitioned into football coaching.

Also associated with the Fiwale Hill Mission were:

- Revd Paul Kasongo, described as a prominent local church leader involved in training and equipping local church leaders and evangelists alongside missionaries at Fiwale Hill Mission.
- Anasi Lupunga, also a prominent local church leader who contributed to the training and equipping efforts at the Fiwale Hill Mission.
- Bob Litana, another prominent local church leader involved in the Fiwale Hill Mission's work of training and equipping local church leaders and evangelists alongside missionaries.

== See also ==
- Geography of Zambia
- Howard Mwikuta
- Healthcare in Zambia
- Education in Zambia
