= Kenny Mwape =

Zambian footballer and coach (1955-2007)

Personal information
- Full name: Kenneth Mwape
- Date of birth: 1955
- Place of birth: Luanshya, Northern Rhodesia
- Date of death: 2007 (aged 51–52)
- Place of death: Gaborone, Botswana
- Position: Goalkeeper

Youth career
- 1970–1971: Roan United

Senior career*
| Years | Team | Apps | (Gls) |
| 1972 | Luanshya Blue Devils | | |
| 1973 | Mufulira Blackpool | | |
| 1974 | City of Lusaka | | |
| 1975–1978 | Green Buffaloes | | |
| 1978–1981 | Power Dynamos | | |
| 1982 | Lusaka Tigers | | |

International career
| 1980–1981 | Zambia | 21 | (0) |

Managerial career
- Notwane
- Mochudi Centre Chiefs
- LCS Gunners
- Botswana
- * Club domestic league appearances and goals

Mirade “Kenny” Mwape (1955–2007) was a Zambian goalkeeper and coach. He was Zambia's goalkeeper at the Moscow Olympic Games in 1980 and played for several Zambian clubs including Power Dynamos. Mwape's elder brother Emmanuel also played in goal for Zambia.

== Playing career ==
Mwape was born in Luanshya and he started out in Roan United's youth team in 1970, following in the footsteps of his elder brother Emmanuel Mwape who was the first choice goalkeeper at Roan and the national team. Mwape stayed at Roan for two seasons but due to limited first-team opportunities, he was loaned to Division II side Luanshya Blue Devils in 1972 but left the following year to join Mufulira Blackpool where he stayed for a season before moving to City of Lusaka.

In the 1975 soccer season, Mwape moved to Green Buffaloes where he would stay for four seasons. On 26 February 1977, in a game against Mufulira Blackpool at Kamuchanga Stadium in Mufulira, Mwape was involved in a fracas which led to a suspension and court charges for him and four team-mates Obby Kapita, Francis Kajiya, Peter Tembo and Chris Kaoma.

The riot started immediately the match ended and was caused by a disputed winning goal for Blackpool, scored from a corner kick in the last minute of the match which Buffaloes disputed as offside and as soon as the match ended, Buffaloes players surrounded the referee and kicked him around. This caused policemen to rush onto the pitch but Buffaloes players turned on them forcing the police to fire teargas and as the crowd fled, a stampede ensued. The police ran out of teargas canisters and Buffaloes players turned on the crowd, beating and kicking everyone in sight and this led to two infants, a youth, a woman and two policemen being admitted to hospital and many more fans treated for injuries.

Two weeks later the case was brought before the Football Association of Zambia FAZ disciplinary committee and the five players were suspended for 12 months each but when Buffaloes appealed, the FAZ executive committee quashed the suspensions and ordered a second hearing of the case which did not take place. The Mufulira Magaistrate courts however found the five guilty of committing a breach of the peace and assault and they were fined K10 each. The four were freed when Kapita's father paid the fines for all of them.

Mwape who was a Seargent in the Zambia Army, the sponsors of Buffaloes, quit to join Power Dynamos in 1979. He won the Independence Cup with Dynamos in his first season, saving a penalty during a 7–6 shoot-out win over Ndola United. He followed in his brother's footsteps when he was called to the national team and he made his debut in April 1980 in a 2–0 win over Tanzania in a tournament to celebrate Zimbabwe's independence, and this gave the siblings a unique record . The following month, Mwape was in goal for Zambia in 1–1 draw in a friendly match against Malawi in Lusaka, with his elder brother Emmanuel on the bench as the reserve goalkeeper.

He was in goal at the 1980 Olympics where Zambia lost all their group stage matches. Later that year, he helped Dynamos retain the Independence Cup with a 2–0 victory over his former club Buffaloes. This qualified Dynamos to represent Zambia in the African Cup Winners Cup.

In October 1981, Dynamos announced that Mwape had been expelled from the club and would never play for them again. It later transpired that Mwape had been accused of taking a bribe during an African Cup Winners Cup tie against Sekondi Hasaacas of Ghana in Accra on 20 September which they lost 3–1 to bow out on a 3–2 aggregate. He was accused of letting in two easy goals and further accused of insubordination during a league fixture against Red Arrows on 13 September which Dynamos lost 2–0.

Mwape's response was "I have been playing for the national team for a long time and never have I ever let the team down. On that fateful day, I had a bad day and God is the only one that knows the truth apart from me." He said he was upset by the accusations and this prompted him to stop playing on his own accord and only then did the club see it fit to suspend him. On the insubordination charges, Mwape disclosed that it had not been easy for him to concentrate on football because two of his children were critically ill and hospitalised in Lusaka. A request to be excused at half-time was rejected with Dynamos coach Freddie Mwila telling him there was no one else to replace him. Mwila confirmed that he had had no suitable replacement for Mwape but had helped him onto the Arrows plane to Lusaka to see his children.

He resigned from Copperbelt Power Company who were Dynamos' sponsors and headed to Lusaka where he was linked to Division I promotion side Profund Warriors but the club made an about-turn when they found out that Mwape was on an indefinite suspension from Dynamos, a suspension which also prevented him from featuring for the country and effectively ended his international career.

He then joined Lusaka Tigers in the 1982 season and the following season crossed over to Botswana where he coached club sides Notwane, Centre Chiefs and LCS Gunners.

Mwape died in 2007 in Gaborone after illness.
