= Davies Mwape =

Zambian footballer (born 1986)

Personal information
- Full name: David Robby Mwape
- Date of birth: 5 December 1986 (age 39)
- Place of birth: Kitwe, Zambia
- Height: 1.70 m (5 ft 7 in)
- Position: Striker

Youth career
- Nkwiza FC
- Police Tigers

Senior career*
Years	Team	Apps	(Gls)
2004–2005	Chambishi		
2005–2006	Orlando Pirates	8	(0)
2006–2007	FC AK		
2007–2008	Jomo Cosmos		
2009	Zanaco		
2010	Konkola Blades		
2010–2012	Young Africans		
2012	Roan United		
2013	Zanaco		
2014	Petrojet SC	6	(0)
2014	Zanaco		
2004–2005	NAPSA Stars		

International career
2004–2005	Zambia	6	(0)
- * Club domestic league appearances and goals

Davies Mwape (born 5 December 1986) is a Zambian football striker. He has played for clubs in Zambia, South Africa, Tanzania and Egypt.

== Playing career ==
Mwape was born in Kitwe, Mwape began playing club football for local side Chambishi F.C. After two seasons with the senior side, he moved to South Africa to play for Orlando Pirates. He joined FC AK the following season. A spell with Jomo Cosmos followed.

Mwape returned to Zambia to play for Zanaco F.C. and Konkola Blades F.C. before moving to Tanzania to play for Young Africans S.C.

Mwape has made several appearances for the senior Zambia national football team, including three FIFA World Cup qualifying matches, and he participated in the 2005 COSAFA Cup.

The former Chipolopolo striker, who last played for the national soccer team on 3 September 2005, signed a contract with the Egyptian Premier league side Petrojet Suez Football Club on 7 October 2013. Mwape's contract clause has no market valuation and contract period.
