= Dale Studzinski =

South African soccer player

Personal information
- Full name: Dale Evan Studzinski
- Date of birth: 6 August 1979 (age 47)
- Place of birth: Durban, South Africa
- Height: 1.94 m (6 ft 4 in)
- Position: Striker

Senior career*
Years	Team	Apps	(Gls)
2003–2004	Manning Rangers		
2004–2007	Supersport United		
2006–2007	→ Silver Stars (loan)		
2007–2009	Bidvest Wits		
2009–2010	Thanda Royal Zulu		
2010	Nathi Lions		
- * Club domestic league appearances and goals as of 31 August 2011 ‡ National team caps and goals as of 31 August 2011

Dale Studzinski (born 6 August 1979 in Durban, KwaZulu-Natal) is a retired South African football striker.
