= Phelelani Mpangase =

South African soccer player

Personal information
- Full name: Phelelani Innocent Mpangase
- Date of birth: 30 December 1983 (age 42)
- Place of birth: Durban, South Africa
- Positions: Left-back; central defender

Youth career
- Mpofane Swallows
- Real Madrid (South Africa)
- UKZN

Senior career*
Years	Team	Apps	(Gls)
–2008	Nathi Lions		
2008–2009	Mamelodi Sundowns		
2009–2010	Supersport United	4	(0)
2010–2013	Platinum Stars	36	(1)
2013–2014	Thanda Royal Zulu	3	(0)
- * Club domestic league appearances and goals

Phelelani Mpangase (born 30 December 1983 in Durban) is a South African soccer player who plays as a defender for Platinum Stars.
