= Mthokozisi =

Mthokozisi is a masculine given name. Notable people with the name include:

- Mthokozisi Dube (born 1992), South African footballer
- Mthokozisi Selby Khumalo (born 1971), South African politician, civil servant and preacher
- Malachi Tyrese Mthokozisi Napa (born 1999), English footballer
- Mthokozisi Nxumalo (1989–2021), South African politician
- Mthokozisi Shezi (born 1987), South African cricketer and umpire
- Mthokozisi Yende (born 1984), South African footballer
