= 2004 Coca-Cola Cup =

2004 Coca-Cola Knockout
Tournament details
- Country: South Africa
- Teams: 16

Final positions
- Champions: Kaizer Chiefs
- Runners-up: SuperSport United

The 2004 Coca-Cola Cup was the 23rd edition of the Coca-Cola Cup, a South African cup competition comprising the 16 teams in the Premiership. Kaizer Chiefs defended their title, defeating SuperSport United 1–0.

The competition was the second last under the sponsorship of Coca-Cola, and was renamed the Telkom Knockout in 2006.

== Results ==
=== Final ===
18 December 2004

| Kaizer Chiefs | 1–0 | SuperSport United |
|---|---|---|
| Mbesuma 79' |
