= Kafubu Stadium =

Sports venue in Luanshya, Zambia

- Interactive map of Kafubu Stadium
- Full name: Kafubu Stadium
- Location: Luanshya, Zambia
- Coordinates: 13.1399°S 28.3808°E
- Capacity: 8,000

Tenant
- Roan United F.C.

Kafubu Stadium is a multi-use stadium in Luanshya, Zambia. It is currently used mostly for football matches, on club level by Roan United F.C. of the Zambia Super League. The stadium has a capacity of 8,000 spectators.
