= Yebo Yes United F.C. =

South African football club

Yebo Yes United
- Full name: Yebo Yes United Football Club
- Nickname(s): The Soweto Starlings
- Founded: 1999; 26 years ago (as Yebo Yes United)
- Ground: Arthur Block Park, Mayfair Johannesburg
- League: SAB Regional League

Yebo Yes United is a South African fourth division football club. The club currently plays in the SAB Regional League and is the Development and Feeder Club to Orlando Pirates Football Club. The relationship works in two ways Yebo Yes United develops players for Orlando Pirates and in exchange Orlando Pirates sponsors transport and on field equipment. The club is a fully competitive entity and can be classed as semi professional in nature. The club's home venue is Arthur Block Park in Mayfair, Johannesburg.

== History ==
Yebo Yes United was established in 1999 as a development and feeder club to Orlando Pirates. The original club name and logo were conceptualised to reflect an association with South African telecommunications companies that sponsored the club at the time.

== Rebranding ==
On 18 August 2015, the club rebranded to usher in a new era of professionalism. The club moved away from its initial branding concept of The Yes Men to become The Soweto Starlings. The Soweto Starlings concept reflects a tribal greater blue-eared starling bird, above a three dimensional ball framed within a two tone interlinking crest which represents unity.

== Graduates ==
List of players that have come through the ranks at Yebo Yes United:

- (South Africa) Senzo Meyiwa, Goalkeeper
- (South Africa) Brighton Mhlongo, Goalkeeper
- (South Africa) Ntando Nkala, Goalkeeper
- (South Africa) Thabang Khasu, Goalkeeper
- (South Africa) Mbongeni Gumede, Defender
- (South Africa) Mthokozisi Dube, Defender
- (South Africa) Michael Morton, Defender
- (South Africa) Daniel Cardoso, Defender
- (South Africa) Tlou Segolela, Midfielder
- (South Africa) Benedict Vilakazi, Midfielder
- (South Africa) Gift Leremi, Midfielder
- (South Africa) William Twala, Midfielder
- (South Africa) Sipho Jembula, Midfielder
- (South Africa) Marco Jose De Silva, Midfielder
- (South Africa) Peter Manaka, Midfielder
- (South Africa) Lindokuhle Mkhwanazi, Midfielder
- (South Africa) Mduduzi Nyanda, Midfielder
- (South Africa) Raymond Maluleke, Forward

== Honours ==
- ABC Motsepe League (Gauteng Stream) Champions: 2005–06, 2006–07
- SAFA Nedbank Cup (Gauteng Stream) Champions: 2007, 2008

== Sponsors ==
- Professional Football Club: Orlando Pirates
- Gym Facility Company: Zone Fitness
- Internet Service Provider: Afrihost
- Bottled Still and Flavoured Water Company: aQuellé
- Digital Design Company: Brown Productions
