= 2008 Nedbank Cup =

ke yona (the one)

Tournament details
- Country: South Africa
- Teams: 32

Final positions
- Champions: Mamelodi Sundowns

Tournament statistics
- Matches played: 5
- Goals scored: 13 (2.6 per match)

Nedbank Cup is a South African club football (soccer) tournament. The knockout tournament, based on the English FA Cup format, was one of a weak opponent facing a stronger one. The competition was sponsored by ABSA until 2007, after which Nedbank took over sponsorship.

== Format ==
The 16 Premiership clubs, 8 National First Division teams, as well as 8 teams from the amateur ranks competed for the prize money of R6 million. The winner also qualified for the CAF Confederation Cup.

The teams are not seeded at any stage, and the first 16 sides drawn out of the hat received home-ground advantage. There were no longer any replays in the tournament, and any games which ended in a draw after 90 minutes were subject to 30 minutes extra time followed by penalties if necessary.

== Teams ==
The 32 teams competing in the Nedbank Cup competition are: (listed according to the league that they are playing in).

=== Premiership ===
1. Ajax Cape Town
2. AmaZulu
3. Bidvest Wits
4. Black Leopards
5. Bloemfontein Celtic
6. Free State Stars
7. Golden Arrows
8. Jomo Cosmos
9. Kaizer Chiefs
10. Mamelodi Sundowns
11. Moroka Swallows
12. Orlando Pirates
13. Platinum Stars
14. Santos
15. Supersport United
16. Thanda Royal Zulu

=== National First Division ===
1. FC Cape Town
2. Nathi Lions
3. Ikapa Sporting
4. Mpumalanga Black Aces
5. Winners Park
6. Durban Stars
7. FC AK
8. Vasco Da Gama

=== Vodacom League ===
1. Yebo Yes United
2. Matatiel Professionals
3. Peace Lovers
4. African Warriors
5. Inspection FC
6. Bloemfontein Young Tigers
7. North West Shining Stars
8. Young Ones

== Results ==
=== Bracket ===
Round of 32
FC Cape Town	1
Durban Stars	0
Bidvest Wits	1 (4)
Winners Park	1 (5)
Kaizer Chiefs	2
Ajax Cape Town	0
Supersport United	1
Mamelodi Sundowns	2
Inspection FC	0
Black Leopards	3
Matatiel Professionals	4
Bloemfontein Young Tigers	3
Peace Lovers	2
Vasco Da Gama	3
AmaZulu	14
Young Ones	0
Mpumalanga Black Aces	2
Thanda Royal Zulu	0
Yebo Yes United	2 (3)
FC AK	2 (4)
Golden Arrows	1 ()
Jomo Cosmos	1 ()
Nathi Lions	1
North West Shining Stars	0
Free State Stars	1 (4)
Platinum Stars	1 (3)
Ikapa Sporting	3
Bloemfontein Celtic	2
African Warriors	0
Moroka Swallows	3
Santos	2 (5)
Orlando Pirates	2 (4)

Round of 16
FC Cape Town	1
Winners Park	0
Kaizer Chiefs	1
Mamelodi Sundowns	1
Black Leopards	2
Matatiel Professionals	0
Vasco Da Gama	0
AmaZulu	5
Mpumalanga Black Aces	1
FC AK	0
Jomo Cosmos	0
Nathi Lions	0
Free State Stars	8
Ikapa Sporting	1
Moroka Swallows	1
Santos	3

Quarter-finals
FC Cape Town	0
Mamelodi Sundowns	2
Black Leopards	2
AmaZulu	3
Mpumalanga Black Aces	2
Nathi Lions	0
Free State Stars	1
Santos	0

Semi-finals
Mamelodi Sundowns	1
AmaZulu	0
Mpumalanga Black Aces	1
Free State Stars	0

Finals
Mamelodi Sundowns	1
Mpumalanga Black Aces	0

== First round (round of 32) ==
Tie no	Home team	Score	Away team
1	Bidvest Wits; Premiership	1 (4) – 1 (5)	Winners Park; National First Division
2	Kaizer Chiefs; Premiership; Phil Evans	2 – 0	Ajax Cape Town; Premiership
3	FC Cape Town; National First Division	1 – 0	Durban Stars; National First Division
4	Yebo Yes United; Vodacom League	2 (3) – 2 (4)	FC AK; National First Division
5	Golden Arrows; Premiership	1 – 1	Jomo Cosmos; Premiership
6	Matatiel Professionals; Vodacom League	4 – 3	Bloemfontein Young Tigers; Vodacom League
7	Supersport United; Premiership	1 – 2	Mamelodi Sundowns; Premiership
8	Nathi Lions; National First Division	1 – 0	North West Shining Stars; Vodacom League
9	Ikapa Sporting; National First Division	3 – 2	Bloemfontein Celtic; Premiership
10	Peace Lovers; Vodacom League	2 – 3	Vasco Da Gama; National First Division
11	Mpumalanga Black Aces; National First Division	2 – 0	Thanda Royal Zulu; Premiership
12	Free State Stars; Premiership	1 (4) – 1 (3)	Platinum Stars; Premiership
13	Santos; Premiership	2 (5) – 2 (4)	Orlando Pirates; Premiership
14	AmaZulu; Premiership	14 – 0	Young Ones; Vodacom League
15	African Warriors; Vodacom League	0 – 3	Moroka Swallows; Premiership
16	Inspection FC; Vodacom League	0 – 3	Black Leopards; Premiership

=== Matches ===
12 March 2008	Wits University	1–1 (a.e.t.) (4–5 p)	Winners Park	Johannesburg
	P.Evans 72'		M.Shivambu 52'

14 March 2008	Kaizer Chiefs	2–0 (a.e.t.)	Ajax Cape Town	FNB Stadium; Jo'burg
	F.McCarthy 102 pen' M.Khenyeza 112'

15 March 2020	FC Cape Town	1–0	Durban Stars	Cape Town, Western Cape
	T.Moleshane 4'

15 March 2020	Supersport United	1–2	Mamelodi Sundowns	Peter Mokaba Stadium, Pretoria, Gauteng
	K.Mashego 68'		S.Moriri 49'; R.Johannes 58'

15 March 2020	Ikapa Sporting	3–2	Bloemfontein Celtic	Cape Town
	S.Walters 59 og' B.August 66'; Kurt Lentjies 89'		M.Spandeel 8' 82'

15 March 2020	Golden Arrows	0–1	Jomo Cosmos	Durban
			Nkosinathi Nhleko 44'

15 March 2020	Peace Lovers	2–3	Vasco da Gama

15 March 2020	Yebo Yes United	2–2 (a.e.t.) (3–4 p)	FC AK
	S.Khali 40'; M.Nyanga 58'		LA.da Cunha 32'; A.Bunjira 89'

==== Teams Qualified for Second round ====
1. Kaizer Chiefs (Premiership)
2. Jomo Cosmos (Premiership)
3. Mamelodi Sundowns (Premiership)
4. Free State Stars (Premiership)
5. Santos (Premiership)
6. AmaZulu (Premiership)
7. Moroka Swallows (Premiership)
8. Black Leopards (Premiership)
9. Winners Park (NFD)
10. FC Cape Town (NFD)
11. FC AK (NFD)
12. Nathi Lions (NFD)
13. Ikapa Sporting (NFD)
14. Vasco Da Gama (NFD)
15. Mpumalanga Black Aces (NFD)
16. Matatiel Professionals (Vodacom League)

== Second round (round of 16) ==
Tie no	Home team	Score	Away team
1	Free State Stars; Premiership	8 – 1	Ikapa Sporting; National First Division
2	Kaizer Chiefs; Premiership	1 (4) – 1 (5)	Mamelodi Sundowns; Premiership
3	Vasco Da Gama; National First Division	0 – 5	AmaZulu; Premiership
4	Mpumalanga Black Aces; National First Division	1 – 0	FC AK; National First Division
5	Moroka Swallows; Premiership	1 – 3	Santos; Premiership
6	FC Cape Town; National First Division	1 – 0	Winners Park; National First Division
7	Jomo Cosmos; Premiership	0 (3) – 0 (5)	Nathi Lions; National First Division
8	Black Leopards; Premiership	2 – 0	Matatiel Professionals; Vodacom League

=== Teams Qualified for Quarter-finals ===
1. AmaZulu (Premiership)
2. Black Leopards (Premiership)
3. Free State Stars (Premiership)
4. Mamelodi Sundowns (Premiership)
5. Santos (Premiership)
6. FC Cape Town (NFD)
7. Mpumalanga Black Aces (NFD)
8. Nathi Lions (NFD)

== Quarter-finals ==
Tie no	Home team	Score	Away team
1	FC Cape Town; National First Division	0 – 2	Mamelodi Sundowns; Premiership
2	Mpumalanga Black Aces; National First Division	2 – 0	Nathi Lions; National First Division
3	Free State Stars; Premiership	1 – 0	Santos; Premiership
4	Black Leopards; Premiership	2 – 3	AmaZulu; Premiership

=== Teams Qualified for Semi-finals ===
1. Mamelodi Sundowns (Premiership)
2. Free State Stars (Premiership)
3. AmaZulu (Premiership)
4. Mpumalanga Black Aces (NFD)

== Semi-finals ==
Tie no	Home team	Score	Away team
1	Mamelodi Sundowns; Premiership	1 – 0	AmaZulu; Premiership
2	Mpumalanga Black Aces; National First Division	1 – 0	Free State Stars; Premiership

=== Teams Qualified for Finals ===
1. Mamelodi Sundowns (Premiership)
2. Mpumalanga Black Aces (NFD)

=== Finals ===
Tie no	Home team	Score	Away team
1	Mamelodi Sundowns; Premiership	1 – 0	Mpumalanga Black Aces; National First Division

NEDBANK CUP
2008 champions

3rd title
