= Francis Kajiya =

Zambian footballer (1954-2013)

Personal information
- Date of birth: 1954
- Date of death: 28 August 2013 (aged 59)
- Place of death: Lusaka, Zambia
- Position: Right winger

Senior career*
| Years | Team | Apps | (Gls) |
| 1972–1985 | Green Buffaloes | | |
- Ndola United

International career
- Zambia
- * Club domestic league appearances and goals

Francis Kajiya (1954 – 28 August 2013) was a Zambian footballer who played as a right winger.

== Career ==
Kajiya played club football for Green Buffaloes and Ndola United, as well as the Zambian national team.

== Personal life ==
Kajiya had 11 children, including fellow player Collins Mbesuma.
