= Howard Mwikuta =

Zambian footballer and coach (1941–1988)

- Mwikuta in 1967

Personal information
- Date of birth: 20 June 1941
- Place of birth: Ndola, Northern Rhodesia
- Date of death: 26 February 1988 (aged 46)
- Place of death: Chililabombwe, Zambia
- Position: Defender

Senior career*
Years	Team	Apps	(Gls)
1958–1964	Bancroft North End (later Bancroft Blades)		
1965–1966	Broken Hill Warriors (later Kabwe Warriors)		
1967	Atlanta Chiefs	22	(1)
1969–1970	Dallas Tornado	11	(0)
1974	Toronto Hungaria		

International career
1964–1966	Zambia	17	(0)
- * Club domestic league appearances and goals

Howard Simon Mwikuta (20 June 1941 – 26 February 1988) was a Zambian footballer and coach who featured in the first Zambia national team at independence in October 1964. He was named Zambian captain in 1966 and at the end of the season was voted Zambian Sportsman of the Year. Mwikuta was one of the first Zambians to play professional football abroad when he signed for American club Atlanta Chiefs in 1967, together with Emment Kapengwe and Freddie Mwila. He became the first player born and raised in Africa to play in the NFL when he featured for the Dallas Cowboys in the 1970 pre-season as a placekicker.

== Playing career ==
Mwikuta was born in Ndola on 20 June 1941 and was brought up by his elder brother after losing both parents at the age of two. He went to Chimoto and Fiwale Mission Schools for his primary education before moving to Bancroft (Chililabombwe) in 1957 where he joined the mine. He first played schools football and then joined Bancroft Blades, graduating to the first-team by 1958 as a full-back or half-back. In the same season, he was chosen to represent the Rest of Northern Rhodesia against Katanga in Elizabethville in Congo and from then on was a permanent fixture in the Northern Rhodesian or Zambian sides.

The determined tackler was part of the first-team that played under the name Zambia, winning the Mufulu (Freedom) Cup in Malawi in July 1964 with wins over Tanganyika (Tanzania) and the hosts. He also featured in the Zambian team that hosted Kenya, Uganda and Ghana during Zambia's independence celebrations in October of the same year.

The powerfully built Mwikuta not only had the stamina to keep running for 90 minutes and beyond, he was also famous for his long throw-ins and packed a powerful shot. In 1965, he switched to Broken Hill Warriors and the following year he was made captain of the club. He led the team to the Castle Cup final and to third position in the league after a second from bottom finish in 1965.

He also captained Zambia in Malawi in a tournament staged by the hosts to celebrate the country's achievement of republic status in July 1966, which Zambia won after beating Madagascar 3–0 and the hosts 6–0. He also led Zambia to a Rothmans Cup triumph over Kenya in September 1966.

He made 17 international appearances from July 1964 to the end of 1966. When Phil Woosnam, coach of Atlanta Chiefs in the newly introduced Professional Soccer League in America came to Zambia for the second time in December 1966, he approached Mwikuta, Mwila and Kapengwe on behalf of Chiefs. Mwikuta's deal was rushed through club, National Football League (NFL) and Football Association of Zambia (FAZ) executives in less than a week. Woosnam made the most attractive offer made to Zambian players at the time: close to £200 per month plus bonuses, with one-year contracts upon successful conclusion of a two-month trial. Mwikuta accepted the offer and promised to return to Zambia to pass on what he would learn to the younger generation. In fact, he had been saving up for a trip to Britain later in the year where he hoped to see some top class European football and all of a sudden, he found himself with an all expenses paid trip and the chance of a lifetime.

After clarification of FIFA's recognition of the American league, Mwikuta left for Atlanta with Kapengwe, Mwila and Chief's scout Doug Sammons on 22 February 1967, becoming the first Zambian players to play professional soccer abroad. Mwikuta impressed Chiefs' coaching staff with his fitness, often waiting for the rest of the players to catch up during training runs. Chief's assistant coach Vic Crowe once told him "We will have to start you running an hour ahead of time so that everyone is even when training begins."

He missed some early season games for illness and the last few with an ankle injury, playing 22 games for Chiefs and scoring one goal against Toronto. At the end of the season, Kapengwe and Mwila were re-signed so Mwikuta again left Zambia on 22 December 1967 for the US, sponsoring himself for a course in physical education and soccer coaching because he realised that Zambia badly needed professional coaches. In Atlanta, he found that the youngsters soccer skills far behind their Zambian age-mates so he starting coaching. "In my country, kids begin to play soccer at the age of five," he told his American friends. It pained him to see kids idling about, when they could do something in their spare time – like play soccer – but he also saw there was need for qualified help.

He worked for the city of Atlanta Recreation Department. He coached soccer and football in Atlanta. Howard Long stated the employee organized programs and that participants learned from him.

In mid-1969, Topic, an American monthly, carried an article covering Mwikuta's contribution to Atlanta and youth since moving there in February 1968. Mwikuta would later spend most of his time coaching in local schools and around the state of Georgia. He also conducted clinics for referees and linesmen and attended a mass Boy Scout Jamboree at Pine Mountain where he lectured on soccer and Zambia.

In 1969, he signed with Dallas Tornado for two seasons (69–70) before trying his hand at American football with the Dallas Cowboys and became the first born and raised African to feature in the NFL when he appeared in the 1970 preseason. However, he was released before the regular season began. Mwikuta coached the men's varsity soccer team at Southern Methodist University (SMU) from 1974 to 1979. Because of his contribution to community work and the development of youth in the US, Mwikuta met at the White House US President Jimmy Carter. He eventually completed his studies with degrees in physical education and soccer coaching and came back to Zambia after a 12-year absence. Mwikuta settled in Zaire (now Congo DR) where he began coaching Tshikuku United in Shaba Province. In 1974, he played in Canada with Toronto Hungaria in the National Soccer League.

== Death ==
In February 1988, he travelled to Zambia to visit friends and relatives and on the morning of 26 February 1988, Mwikuta was at his brother's house in Chililabombwe when he collapsed and died of a heart attack.
