= Kurt Lentjies =

South African soccer player

Personal information
- Full name: Kurt Heino Lentjies
- Date of birth: 17 February 1985 (age 41)
- Place of birth: Cape Town, South Africa
- Height: 1.72 m (5 ft 7 1/2 in)
- Position: Attacking midfielder

Youth career
- Bayhill United
- FC Fortune

Senior career*
Years	Team	Apps	(Gls)
2002–2006	FC Fortune		
2006–2008	Ikapa Sporting		
2008–2010	Mamelodi Sundowns	22	(1)
2009–2010	→ Maritzburg United (loan)	6	(1)
2010–2012	Maritzburg United	47	(4)
2012–2013	Bloemfontein Celtic	11	(0)
2013–2014	SuperSport United	7	(0)
2014–2017	Maritzburg United	91	(17)
2017–2021	Chippa United	59	(2)

Managerial career
- 2021: Chippa United
- * Club domestic league appearances and goals as of 00:58, 2 January 2020 (UTC)

Kurt Lentjies (born 17 February 1985) is a South African professional soccer coach and former player who both played for and coached Chippa United in the Premier Soccer League.

== Honours ==
- 2007/08 NFD Coastal Stream Player of the Year
