= Freddie Mwila =

Zambian football player and coach (1946–2026)

Fred Mwila
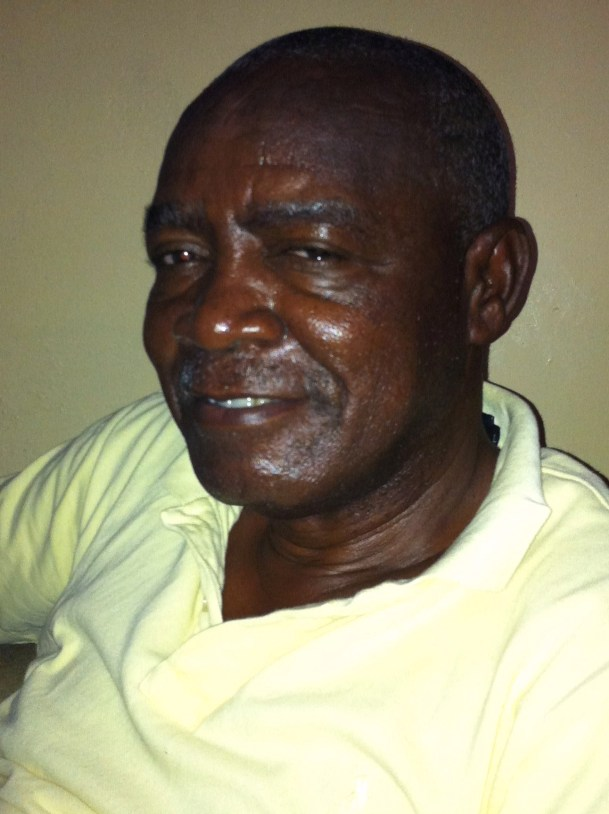
- Mwila in 2012

Personal information
- Date of birth: 6 July 1946
- Place of birth: Kasama, Northern Rhodesia
- Date of death: 2 November 2026 (aged 80)
- Place of death: Lusaka, Zambia
- Position: Midfielder

Youth career
- 1960–1963: Wusakile Youth Club

Senior career*
Years	Team	Apps	(Gls)
1964–1966	Rhokana United		
1967–1969	Atlanta Chiefs	72	(17)
1969–1970	Aston Villa F.C.	1	(0)
1970	Rhokana United		
1971	Atlanta Chiefs	22	(5)
1971–1973	Rhokana United		
1973	Atlanta Apollos	19	(3)
1973–1977	Ndola United		

International career
1965–1974	Zambia	36	(15)

Managerial career
- 1973–1977: Ndola United
- 1978: Nkwazi F.C.
- 1978–1979: TAFIC
- 1979–1985: Power Dynamos
- 1986: Ziscosteel F.C.
- 1987–1990: Circuit Chiefs F.C.
- 1990–1992: Power Dynamos
- 1992–1993: Township Rollers
- 1992–1993: Botswana
- 1993: Zambia
- 1994–1996: Township Rollers
- 1994–1996: Botswana
- 1996–1997: Zambia
- 1997–1998: Qwa Qwa Stars
- 1998–1999: Zanaco
- 2000: Lusaka Dynamos F.C.
- * Club domestic league appearances and goals

Freddie Mwila (6 July 1946 – 2 November 2026) was a Zambian association football player and coach. Rated as one of the country's greatest players and coaches, he featured for Rhokana United and was one of the first Zambians to play professional football abroad when he joined American side Atlanta Chiefs in 1967. Mwila also played for Aston Villa in England and made an impact as a coach, leading Power Dynamos to the 1991 African Cup Winners' Cup and coached several other club sides as well as the Zambia and Botswana national teams.

== Early life ==
Mwila was born in Kasama and was raised by his grandparents because his father Dismas Chilufya and mother Senefa Chola were working in Southern Rhodesia (Zimbabwe) and moved to Kitwe in 1952 when his grandfather decided to move him to the Copperbelt so that he could start school.

In 1954, he started school at Danbar Primary School, where the heavy industrial area in Kitwe stands today. He later moved to Buseko Primary School where Mwila was involved, like many other young boys on the Copperbelt, in playing football in the townships where nothing but buttons were at stake.

He left Buseko to continue his schooling at Mindolo Primary School where his teachers, without realising the potential he had for football, made him play other sports like boxing, until he left for Kalela School in Wusakile Mine township. Mwila continued playing football at Kalela and was very keen on watching soccer matches at Scrivener Stadium, where he managed to be present at almost every game through being a ball-boy.

The young Mwila joined Wusakile Youth Club where he witnessed the formation of an under–five-feet team of which he was made captain. They played a similar team from Luanshya nearly every month and this was how he came into contact with players like Boniface Simutowe, Sandy Kaposa and Simon Kapende. They also played against teams from other Copperbelt towns.

In 1961, the team travelled to Bulawayo where they lost one game and drew the other. Mwila also had an opportunity to visit his parents, and on his return from Bulawayo, he moved to Kitwe Main School to complete his primary education. During this time, he also devoted many hours to playing football. He played inside-left for the school team.

== Playing career ==
Mwila qualified for secondary education and went to Luanshimba School in 1964, and while a student there, he frequented Scrivener Stadium and trained regularly in the company of Edward Kalale, Lazarus Musumali, Eric Chekoloko, Isaac Musakanya and Simon Chande, players that coach White had brought in to rejuvenate the team. He also struck up a very good partnership with Henry Kalimukwa and developed into a creative midfielder who could pass and score goals. The left-footed Mwila worked hard in the reserve side and made it into the first team in 1965.

That same year, Mwila left school to join Rothmans of Pall Mall as a trainee salesman and in 1966, the company organised a course in salesmanship at Nairobi's New Era College for six months. While there he played for the Abaluya F.C. and he read in the papers that four Zambians Howard Mwikuta, Emment Kapengwe, Samuel "Zoom" Ndhlovu and Mwila himself had been picked by British coach Phil Woosnam to go and play in the professional league in America, with the Atlanta Chiefs.

He came back to Zambia in January 1967 to prepare for the journey to the US. Mwila, Kapengwe and Mwikuta left Zambia for America on 23 February 1967 where they underwent a two-month trial and were signed.

Mwila returned to Zambia at the end of the season in October 1967, and returned to Atlanta for the 1968 season and won the league. He also played against several European sides, among them, Manchester City and Aston Villa. On 27 May 1968, the 21-year-old Mwila scored the winning goal in a stunning 3–2 upset of the English champions Manchester City. He scored twice on the night, before a crowd of 23,141, the largest ever to witness a soccer game in Atlanta Stadium.

It sounded like sour grapes when Manchester City coach Malcolm Allison described Chiefs' play as worse than 'fourth division standard,' and that Mwila was offside. "They couldn't play in the fourth division in England," he said. "The kid who kicked the last goal was offside by at least four yards. The officials just didn't catch it. There's nothing you can do about it.

Three weeks later, Chiefs handed Manchester City their second straight whipping before an even bigger crowd of 25,856 and Mwila was on target again but this time from the penalty spot in a 2–1 win and Motaung grabbed the other as if to prove that Chiefs were good enough to play against the best and win. The Zambians also played in a friendly match against Brazilian side Santos, which featured Pelé.

It was during such encounters that Tommy Docherty, then Manager of English Division II side Aston Villa, saw the two Zambians in action and signed them on. They arrived in Birmingham in August 1969 and signed for Villa for two years. There, they met Brian Tiler, who would later coach the Zambia national team. Kapengwe made three football league appearances and Mwila featured only once, becoming the second and third black players to play for Villa and the first Zambians to play in England. Unfortunately, results were not very good and Villa were relegated to the third division. Docherty left the team and the duo decided to come back home after 9 months with Villa.

The duo had attended a two-week coaching course in Lilleshall coaching school in 1969. Upon their return, Mwila was appointed Zambian player-coach for the 3 match series against French club Racing Club de Strasbourg in June 1970 for the Peter Stuyvesant trophy, making him the youngest coach to take charge of the Zambia national team eight days before his 24th birthday, albeit in matches which were not full internationals.

Both Mwila and team manager Donald Musumali warned would-be interferers that they were 'intimidation-proof' and would not be pushed around, as they knew their responsibilities very well. After the first game which ended in a 2–2 draw at Dag Hammarskjoeld Stadium, Mwila launched a scathing attack on football administrators, charging that some of the 'national team selectors would make better spectators than football administrators.' He was particularly incensed by one Football Association of Zambia (FAZ) official who entered the dressing room at half-time and told Boniface Simutowe he looked 'very excited' during the first half, and also suggested to Mwila and Musumali that certain players should be replaced.

The fearless Mwila added, 'if this kind of behaviour by our selectors continues, I am prepared to be dropped from the national team.'

Unsurprisingly, he was absent from the team for the remainder of the season, both as player and coach. In 1971, Mwila returned to Atlanta in March 1971 to complete the two-year contract he had signed in 1968, fearing that if he objected, the club would take action against him since he was still regarded as their player. When he returned home in September, he charged that the Chiefs had breached the terms of his contract by not paying him more than he was getting previously. He played in 22 games and scored 5 goals and when the season ended in August, he got his clearance together with Motaung.

Mwila's association with Chiefs continued when he left Rhokana to join them yet again in May 1973. The team had changed its name to the Atlanta Apollos after a change of ownership. Apart from playing in Atlanta, he was supposed to go to England for a full-time coaching course, but he achieved neither ambition. He returned home with Kapengwe in August, who was also frustrated. The outspoken Mwila accused the FAZ of standing in his way by not giving him an international clearance to rejoin Chiefs. During their time in Atlanta, neither of them played a single match, but they spent their time coaching young American footballers in colleges.

Mwila stated that he was happy to be back home but was disappointed with the FAZ. He was also unhappy with comments attributed to FAZ Secretary General Ernest Mate that the players did not achieve anything from their overseas trips, for each time they came back to Zambia they failed lamentably to cope with the standard of football. The duo reminded Mate that as the first Zambians to play overseas, they had helped to put the country on the map soccer-wise.

Before leaving for the States, Mwila had resigned from his job with Rhokana mine, so he joined Ndola United in September as player-coach where he continued playing and when he moved to Nkwazi in 1978 as player-coach, he played three games for them before hanging up his boots. However, Nkwazi were docked points for these matches because the FAZ ruled that he was registered as a coach and not as a player.

== National team ==
Mwila made his debut for Zambia at the age of 18 against English side Middlesex Wanderers on 13 June 1965 and scored the first goal in a 2–2 draw in Ndola. His full international debut came in September against Kenya when Zambia won the Rothmans International trophy. Although the two teams tied 8–8 on aggregate in the 3 match series, Zambia were awarded the trophy on the grounds that they had forced six corners to Kenya's five in the final match.

He was in the team that won the Malawi Republic cup, scoring 4 goals when Zambia defeated the hosts 6–0 on his birthday in July 1966 and was also in the team that won the Rothmans International trophy against Kenya later that year. In December 1967, he captained Zambia to the Jamhuri cup victory against Kenya and was also captain in World Cup qualifying matches against Sudan which Zambia lost on a strange rule that they had lost the second leg despite the aggregate score being tied at 6–6.

In June 1972, he scored a hat-trick when Zambia overwhelmed Lesotho 6–1 in a World cup qualifier in Ndola.

Mwila featured at Zambia's first ever CAN appearance in Egypt where Zambia lost the final to Zaire after a replay and after the tournament quit playing for the national team because he felt he had reached retirement age.

He is one of Zambia's highest scoring midfielders with 15 goals in full international matches.

== Coaching career ==
Mwila got involved in coaching from an early age. In 1967, John Green of the Zambian National Sports Foundation (NSF) who would later serve as national team coach chose him to coach schoolboys and in 1970, he coached youths on behalf of the NSF in youth centres in Kitwe.

He also served as Rhokana player-coach and moved to Ndola United in 1973 in the same capacity. Ndola finished third in 1975 and 1976 after leading the league table in the early stages of the season. He attended another coaching course in Essen, Germany, alongside his old national teammate, Henry Kalimukwa and coached Zambia with Brightwell Banda at CECAFA 76, where they lost 2–0 to Uganda in the final. Mwila also served as assistant coach during the short-lived reign of Teddy Virba as national team coach.

In October 1977, he was dismissed by Ndola for not 'showing interest in the club's affairs,' to which he responded that he was not bitter and if the action was in the interest of the club then he was totally for it and he wished the team good luck. He was recruited by Zambia Police side Nkwazi at the beginning of the following year but was sidelined after 6 months when players accused him of ill-treating them and handling them like small children. Mwila also allegedly denounced players in the team as 'too old.' A string of defeats did not help matters and furthermore, Nkwazi forfeited points in three league matches because they used Mwila as a player when he was only registered as a coach.

Mwila countered that when he went to Nkwazi, he was told that he would build a team in three years but things changed and the officials wanted instant success. They also advised him to handle the players properly as some of them were senior in rank. His response was that there was no rank in football and that he was simply telling the truth when he told the players that they needed new blood to rejuvenate the team.

‘Well, some people might say I have a hot temper but those who know me understand that I try to please all sides. However, as a coach, you are bound to raise your voice once in a while, but this cannot be taken as harshness. Anyway, a human being has his good and bad days.’

After leaving Nkwazi, he crossed the border into Botswana and took over as coach of first division team Tafic FC. However, barely a year later, his mother died, and he returned to Zambia to take up a coaching job at Power Dynamos, a side that was then being called "The Baby Born With Teeth'’ due to its meteoric rise from the lower ranks.

He spent seven years at Dynamos and won an impressive collection of silverware with the Kitwe club. His first trophy was the Independence Cup in 1979 and they retained it the following year and went on to win it for a third time in 1982. Mwila became the first Zambian coach to lead a local side to the finals of a continental championship which Dynamos lost 4–0 on aggregate to Egypt's Arab Contractors in 1982.

In April 1983, Mwila spoke of some 'first-choice' players coercing junior colleagues in a futile attempt to oust him from his position. 'A star is only as good as his last game,' he said. 'Some of these senior players have been below par so far and (Technical Advisor) Bill McGarry and myself have been shouting at them about this. After all, I get paid for shouting at them because that is my job.

That same year, Dynamos won the Rothmans International trophy in the 6 nations African Club soccer tournament in Abidjan, Ivory Coast after beating home team Stella Abidjan of Ivory Coast 2–1, FC 105 from Gabon 4–1 and Nigeria's Bendel Insurance 2–1. In the final, Dynamos drew 0–0 with Camerounian giants Tonnere Yaonde FC and won 5–4 on post match penalties with 'keeper Blackwell Chalwe saving the decisive spot-kick after a goalless 90 minutes. Mwila also completed two refresher coaching courses at English side Tottenham Hotspur in 1981 and 1983.

In 1984, Dynamos were tipped to win the league title and they lived up to people's expectations when they went on an unbeaten run from the beginning of the season in the first week of March to the end of October when 'Mighty' Mufulira Wanderers stopped them 2–0. Mwila was gracious in defeat and congratulated Wanderers for their victory, but Dynamos avenged the defeat by whipping Wanderers 4–1 in the reverse fixture at Arthur Davies Stadium and went on to win the title with just one a single defeat. Dynamos also bested Wanderers 2–0 to win the Champion of Champions trophy in Ndola and Mwila was voted coach of the year and became the first winner of the newly introduced award.

Early the following year, Mwila underwent another coaching course in Brazil and in August, Dynamos lost a BP Challenge Cup first round match to Division I side City of Lusaka 3–0 which upset Mwila. "It's I who should be blamed and maybe a change of coaches may bring some spark into the team because I may have been telling them the same old techniques." He singled out Alex Chola as a possible candidate for his job. There were reports of dissension from the players as well, unhappy with his attitude towards them. He resigned and Chola did take over although Power surrendered the title to bitter rivals Nkana Red Devils (formerly Rhokana United and later Nkana FC) and the Champion of Champions trophy to Wanderers. The players though, said they were very happy with Chola's training methods.

In April 1986, Mwila was on the move again, signing a two-year contract with Ziscosteel of Zimbabwe in April 1986 but his contract was terminated in August after some poor results. The club said they took the action to avoid relegation. In 1987, Arthur Davies, the man who had nurtured Power Dynamos to the force they were crossed over to FAZ Division II side Circuit Chiefs and took over as chairman and hired Mwila as coach. The same year, Mwila was called to the national team as assistant to Samuel "Zoom" Ndhlovu and at the end of the season was in the running for the coach of the year award which eventually went to Bizwell Phiri of Kabwe Warriors. Mwila was part of Zambia's coaching bench during the President's Cup in South Korea but for undisclosed reasons, was sidelined after that and he missed the Seoul Olympics as a result. Although he asked for reasons why, the FAZ remained mute.

In February 1990, Mwila was appointed coach of Zambia's 'B’ team which was constituted to compete in the Southern African Development Coordinating Conference (SADCC) Cup as the main team was in action CAN 1990 in Algeria. He took up the job with the assistance of German coach Jochen Figge as Technical Advisor and qualified the team to the final of the tournament which Zambia won by beating Zimbabwe 3–1 in Gaborone in August. Five years after leaving Dynamos, Mwila returned as coach amid reports of some players boycotting training upon hearing the news.

Undeterred, Mwila got on with the job with Jim Bone as Technical Advisor and Chola as his assistant. Rechristened 'Power 90,' Dynamos won 3 trophies in 1990, just missing out on the league to Nkana. The following year, Dynamos bagged the big one when they overcame Nigeria's Benue Cement Company Lions 5–4 on aggregate to scoop the Africa Cup Winners Cup, the only Zambian team to have achieved that feat to date. Dynamos had gone down 2–3 in the first leg in Nigeria but were able to win 3–1 at home despite being a goal down at half-time. Dynamos also added the league title for a historic double. Mwila was one of the assistant coaches at CAN 1992 in Senegal where Zambia lost in the quarterfinals to eventual winners Ivory Coast. After being pipped for the coach of the year award by Godfrey Chitalu, Mwila announced his resignation from Dynamos to take over at Township Rollers in Botswana. This time, Dynamos players sided with him and staged an apparent walk-out at the Awards Ceremony in protest against the choice for coach of the year, considering that Mwila had won the country a continental trophy, Zambia's first ever while Chiatlu had guided Warriors from Division I back to the Premier League and won a couple of cups along the way.

With a reputation for putting players under pressure to perform and sometimes uttering uncharitable remarks about non-performers, Mwila said he had not regrets if in the process of executing his duties, he had offended some players as he had only meant to motivate them to put in that extra effort. He said he would miss Dynamos but was happy that he was parting with the club on an amicable note and at a time when it was at its peak. 'You don't leave your wife when she's dying so I am leaving Dynamos when they are at the top. I think it's better this way.'

Later in the year, Mwila was appointed Botswana national team coach and when the national team perished in the Gabon Disaster in April 1993, Mwila was called upon to mould the new team and he obliged after seeking permission from his employers Botswana Football Association. Zambia came within a point of qualifying to the World Cup 1994, losing out to Morocco.

When the Government and the FAZ could not reach an agreement with Roald Poulsen over a new contract in November 1996, Mwila was appointed coach with Ndhlovu as Technical Advisor, with Mwila infamously stating that his predecessor Poulsen had run away because 'he knew that the World Cup qualifier against South Africa in Lusaka would be tough.' The duo's reign was short-lived as they resigned on 11 April 1997 when Zambia failed to beat Zaire in a World Cup qualifier, drawing 2–2 in Harare. George Mungwa took over as caretaker coach but he could not save Zambia's campaign as South Africa grabbed the only ticket to France '98 in the group.

Mwila coached Qwa Qwa Stars in South Africa later in 1997 and returned home to coach Zanaco F.C. in 1998, staying with them for two seasons before being engaged by Lusaka Dynamos in 2000. His stint at Dynamos was short-lived and his next coaching assignment was with Zimbabwe's Highlanders as Technical Advisor to coach Willard Khumalo in 2002 but left after a disastrous CAF Champions League campaign in early 2003.

That same year, in October, he was involved in a road accident after he decided to try his luck with South African side Free State Stars. Just a week before Mwila could sign a contract with the club, he was involved in a road accident. The crash left him with two broken legs but fortunate to escape with his life as Malawian coach Robert Banda, who was driving the car, died instantly in the collision. Mwila has not been actively involved in football since then.

== Personal life and death ==
With his wife Kerrian Fox, Mwila had six children, two of whom also became footballers.

Mwila settled in Lusaka and tried his hand at farming. He made an appearance on Zambian television as part of the panel of analysts analysing games during the 2012 African Cup of Nations tournament which saw Zambia win their first Africa Cup of Nations (AFCON) trophy.

Mwila died in Lusaka on 2 November 2026, at the age of 80.
