= Samuel Ndhlovu =

Zambian footballer and coach (1937-2001)

Personal information
- Date of birth: 27 September 1937
- Place of birth: Luanshya, Northern Rhodesia
- Date of death: 10 October 2001 (age 64)
- Place of death: Mufulira, Zambia
- Position: Forward

Senior career*
Years	Team	Apps	(Gls)
1956–1975	Mufulira Mine Team		

International career
1964–1969	Zambia	19	(8)

Managerial career
- 1966–1971: Mufulira Wanderers
- 1967: Zambia
- 1968: Zambia
- 1969: Zambia
- 1982–1985: Mufulira Wanderers
- 1987–1992: Zambia
- 1993–1996: LCS Gunners
- 2000: Mufulira Wanderers
Medal record
Men's football
Representing Zambia (as manager)
Africa Cup of Nations
Bronze medal – third place	1990
- * Club domestic league appearances and goals

Samuel Ndhlovu (27 September 1937 – 10 October 2001) was a Zambian footballer and coach. Nicknamed "Zoom", he led the "Mighty" Mufulira Wanderers to unparalleled league and cup triumphs for almost two decades. He was named Zambian Sportsman of the Year in 1964 and also served the national team as captain and coach. He is widely regarded as Zambia's best local coach.

== Early life ==
Ndhlovu was born in Luanshya and moved to Mufulira as a boy when his family settled there. At the age of eight, he formed his own team with friends of a similar age and they played in the streets or any open ground, against bigger lads and almost always got beaten. He went to Kankoyo Mine School where he excelled in various sport disciplines and it was from there that he joined the Mufulira Mine Team in 1956. The team later changed its name to Mufulira Wanderers Football Club.

== Playing career ==
=== Club career ===
By 1959, Ndhlovu was co-opted into the welfare section of mine community development as a club organizer and it was in the same year that he found his feet and became a lynchpin at Wanderers. He earned the nickname "Zoom" when a Wanderers fan who could not fathom how easily he dribbled past defenders started calling him ‘Sumu’ instead of ‘Sam.’ This eventually changed to "Zoom" which would become one of the most famous nicknames in Zambian soccer history. It virtually became part of his name with many referring to him simply as ‘Zoom Ndhlovu’.

Ndhlovu experienced segregation in pre-colonial Northern Rhodesia, where two leagues ran side by side–one for whites and one for the Africans. Audiences noted his skill on the ball, close control and deadly shooting.

In 1960 he became Wanderers’ captain and after missing out on the inaugural Zambian National Football League championship of 1962 which was won by Roan United, Wanderers won the title the following year.

Ndhlovu's eye-catching performances in the number 10 shirt for both Wanderers and Zambia made him very popular throughout the country and he was rewarded with the Zambian Sportsman of the Year award for 1964.

In 1965 Wanderers defeated City of Lusaka 5–2 in the Castle Cup final and this qualified them to meet the Castle Cup winners from Southern Rhodesia in the Inter-Rhodesia Castle Cup final. Apart from the prize money of £590, the match carried extra motivation as no Zambian club had won it before and a decision had been taken to do away with the cup by having one last final, after which the winners would keep the trophy for good.

Wanderers crossed the Zambezi River to square off with City Wanderers on 17 October 1965 at Glamis Stadium in Salisbury. The final turned out to be one of the most famous matches in Zambian football history as the Mighty men lined up before a racially segregated crowd of 18,000. The Zambians took the lead with two quick goals from Willie Kunda and Elijah Mwale but City pulled a goal back through striker Kenneth Makoni. Man of the match Ndhlovu put Wanderers further ahead to leave the scores 3–1 at the break. Wanderers then allowed City back into the game when goals by captain Alan Hlathwayo and Richard Chimiya tied the score line and with extra-time looming, Mwale cut in from the left to score a late and historic winner for a final score of 4–3. Ndhlovu called winning the Super Castle Cup was one of the greatest moments of his career.

On 1 June 1966, a benefit match between Wanderers and Kitwe Sports was held in Kitwe to honour Ndhlovu's ten years in football and he scored in the 1–1 draw. Later that month, he travelled to England for six weeks to watch the World Cup after which he attended an English FA coaching course in Durham and also trained with English First Division club Blackpool. Later that year, Wanderers retained the Castle Cup with another extra-time win over Kabwe Warriors after coming from behind twice. He scored the goal that tied the game at 3–3 and took it into extra time, and the fifth goal in a 5–3 victory in a match where Warriors curiously wore shirts with no numbers.

Ndlhovu had a chance to play professional football in 1967 after former Wanderers coach Doug Sammons arranged a stint for him with Atlanta Chiefs in the United States, together with Howard Mwikuta, Freddie Mwila and Emment Kapengwe but he turned down the opportunity to concentrate on developing the game in Zambia, and also due to uncertainty over the legality of the league. As a consequence, the other three became Zambia's first professionals abroad and Chiefs manager Phil Woosnam expressed his disappointment that Ndhlovu would not get to showcase his skills in the newly formed PSL, after drawing coast-to-coast press notices as a result of careful feeding by Woosnam and his publicity department.

Spanning three decades from the 1950s to the 1970s, Samuel 'Zoom' Ndhlovu established himself as a prominent figure in Zambian football. He played a key role in making Mufulira Wanderers a dominant team, contributing to multiple league and cup titles, and was recognized as the 1964 Zambian Sportsman of the Year.

With Samuel Ndhlovu as captain, Wanderers won the Zambian league championship in 1963, 1965, 1966, 1967, and 1969, along with several domestic cup competitions, earning the club the nickname “legendary cup fighters.”

Ndhlovu's popularity was such that he was featured on adverts for various products and on 25 October 1973, he was bestowed with the Insignia of Honour by President Kenneth Kaunda for his service to Zambian football, the first footballer to get such an award.

Ndhlovu was still playing for Wanderers in 1975 as player-coach, scoring in a 1–1 draw with Uganda’s Express in the East and Central Africa Club championship in Kampala though he did not feature much in Wanderers line-up after that. In September of that same year the Wanderers maestro made another appearance when his experience was called upon in the African Club Champions cup quarter-final against Tonnerre Yaounde of Cameroun but his presence did not help as Wanderers lost the first leg 1–0 on a goal by Roger Milla in Yaounde and were eliminated 3–2 on aggregate.

After a long career spanning three decades, Ndhlovu finally called time on his career and concentrated on coaching.

=== International career ===
Ndhlovu first featured for Northern Rhodesia in 1956, making his debut against a Congolese Select side as an eighteen year old. Although there were strong protests against his selection as people felt he was too young, he scored two goals in a match which he described as though he were playing in a dream. He was in the Zambian national team at independence in October 1964 and was reported to have made more appearances than any other Zambian player at the time. He won the Kenya Republic Cup in 1964, the Rothmans International trophy against Kenya in 1965 and the Heroes Cup against Uganda in 1968.

He was made Zambian captain in 1965, replacing Jackie Sewell. In June 1967 he was succeeded by Dickson Makwaza as captain and in December of the same year was handed coaching duties, leading Zambia to a victorious Jamhuri Cup outing in Kenya as player-coach.

He however made a comeback for the national team in December 1968 in a CAN 1970 qualifier against Mauritius in Port Louis after Zambia drew the first leg 2–2 in Lusaka. Zambia won 3–2 and qualified to the next round where they faced Cameroun.

Yet again Zambia could only settle for a 2–2 home draw with Ndhlovu scoring the opening goal. They lost the return leg 2–1 in Yaounde and it proved to be Ndhlovu's last game for his country. Immediately upon arrival from Cameroun, it was reported that Ndhlovu's conduct during a reception for the team after the match had upset the Football Association of Zambia (FAZ) officials and he was suspended from national team matches for the rest of the year and fined.

Ndhlovu defended his behaviour on the Camerounian trip and the matter dragged on in the press and he even considered quitting football altogether as it 'was not the only sport that he could play.' In the end, he apologised for his actions and paid the fine and his ban was lifted.

He made 21 international appearances for Zambia scoring 8 goals from 1964 to 1969.

== Coaching career ==
Ndhlovu got involved in coaching at Wanderers from as early as 1966 when he became player coach replacing Harry McQuillan. From then on, he was involved as player-coach, coach or technical advisor.

Ndhlovu was first appointed national team trainer in 1967 for a trip to Tanzania in July but was unable to make the trip due to work commitments. He however first handled the national team in December of the same year during the Jamhuri tournament against Kenya in Nairobi, at the age of 30 making him the youngest coach to take charge of Zambia in a full international match. Zambia won the two match series 5–1 and 4–3. Ndhlovu also took charge of Zambia as player-coach for a trip to Uganda in October the following year.

He was appointed national player-coach again when a team was assembled to play Congo DR in Kinshasa. This invitation coincided with the visit of Russian team Leningrad Zeniths. FAZ officials accepted the Congolese offer and decided to send an under-strength team to Kinshasa. The result was Zambia's heaviest defeat on 22 November 1969 with Congo romping to a 10–1 victory. Ndhlovu said this was the worst game of his career and he was so shattered that he could not eat after the game.

During the seventies, he was Wanderers Technical Advisor as the coaching role changed from George Sikazwe to Makwaza and in 1982 he took over as coach after Makwaza resigned. He went on to nurture players like Ashols Melu, Efford Chabala, Kalusha Bwalya, Charles Musonda and Johnson Bwalya. He was also the assistant coach to Bill McGarry, Wieslaw Grawboski and Geoff Butler and when the Zambia Football Coaches Association (ZAFCA) was formed, he was elected chairman.

He succeeded Butler as Overseer for Zambia Consolidated Copper Mines (ZCCM) sponsored club coaches in February 1987and did a lot to motivate many local coaches. He commanded a lot of respect from players and fellow coaches and was called ‘Sir Zoom.’

After Zambia performed disastrously at the CAN ‘86 and Coach Brightwell Banda was sidelined, Ndhlovu took over the reins. His first game was an All Africa Games qualifier against Malawi in April 1987 in Lusaka which Zambia won 3–1.

Ndhlovu guided Zambia to the Seoul Olympic Games in 1988 after a 2–1 aggregate win over Ghana. At the games Zambia found itself in a group with Italy, Venezuela and Iraq, where they thought to have little chance of progressing. Zambia defied the odds by topping the group to make it to the quarter-finals after beating both Italy and Venezuela by 4–0 score-lines. They however lost in the quarter-finals to West Germany by the same margin.

Ndhlovu was a proponent of the attacking game and under him Zambia recorded impressive results. He had an exceptional home record but his Achilles’ heel was that he could never get a result away from home when it really mattered.

After the Olympic Games, many expected Zambia to qualify to Italia ‘90 but it was not to be as the team won all its home games but failed to collect a single point on the road. The disappointment of missing out on the World Cup was put behind them at CAN ‘90 in Algeria where Zambia finished third.

Ndhlovu won the SADCC Cup with Zambia, beating Zimbabwe 3–1 in Gaborone in August 1990 and he led Zambia to a CECAFA Cup victory in Uganda the following year.

At the 1992 Cup of Nations Zambia disappointed yet again, losing in the quarter-finals to eventual winners Côte d'Ivoire and the team arrived home to a barrage of criticism with fans calling for his resignation. One accusation levelled at him was that he favoured certain local players at the expense of one or two European based professionals. Ndhlovu appealed for calm and reminded fans that 'emotions never win a war.' "Fans must appreciate in football there are losses, wins and defeats. Even if you bring an angel Zambia will experience defeat one time or another." He refused to step down saying he was the best man for the job and resisted calls for German coach Jochen Figge, who at the time was attached to the Ministry of Sport as a Development Officer, to join the squad. Ndhlovu later relented and said he was ready to work with Figge who politely declined.

The criticism against him continued until he suddenly announced his resignation in July 1992, citing criticism from the media and lack of appreciation from fans. He was particularly incensed by a popular radio programme which questioned his reluctance to step aside and give chance to others.

This left the FAZ in a quandary and when Zambia kicked off the 1994 Nations Cup qualifiers unconvincingly with Figge as Technical Advisor and Simutowe as coach, struggling to overcome Mauritius 2–1 at home and defeating newcomers South Africa 1–0 in Johannesburg, Ndhlovu bounced back into the saddle for the 1994 World Cup qualifiers with a convincing 2–0 home victory against Tanzania in Lusaka and a 4–0 win over Namibia in Windhoek. He also led Zambia to third place at that year's CECAFA tournament with an 8-0 thumping of Zanzibar along the way. However a 2–0 loss away to Madagascar in a World Cup qualifier in December 1992 spelt the end of his reign as coach, only finding out when the FAZ announced in the press that he had been sacked and replaced with a new coaching team of Simwala, Godfrey Chitalu and Alex Chola. He said he was not surprised with the move charging that his dismissal was a fulfilment of a campaign pledge by the newly elected FAZ executive.

Ndhlovu then packed his bags and headed for Lobatse in Botswana where he took charge of one of the country's top clubs LCS Gunners. As a consequence, he was not with the Zambian squad during the fateful flight in April 1993 when the whole team was wiped out in the Gabon disaster. He heard of the plane crash in Botswana and reflected that he would have been on that aircraft had he not decided to come to Botswana after falling out with the FAZ officials. "I do not know whether I should say I am lucky, but because I had disagreements with those fellows, I decided to come here to take up an appointment as Lobatse Extension Gunners coach," he said. He went on to win the league with the Gunners in 1994 and returned home in 1996 when he decided not to renew his contract.

Ndhlovu, who worked as a Community Development Officer and then as Chief Community Development Officer for Zambia Consolidated Copper Mines (ZCCM) in Mufulira was not for the idea of being employed as full-time coach and he rendered his services to the nation on secondment from ZCCM.

During his time as coach from 1987 to 1992 he was in charge of Zambia for more matches than any other coach, suffering only 1 home defeat in a 2–1 loss to Egypt in December 1988 in Kitwe and won all his competitive home games. Of the 22 home matches he won 19 drew 2 and lost 1. Of the 66 games played away from home, Zambia won 28 times, drew 16 and lost 22. He had a win rate of 53%.

However, he made another comeback but this time as Technical Advisor when in November 1996, the Government and the FAZ could not reach an agreement with Roald Poulsen over a new contract and Freddie Mwila was appointed coach. The duo's reign was short-lived as they resigned on 11 April 1997 when Zambia failed to beat Zaire in a World Cup qualifier, drawing 2–2 in Harare. George Mungwa took over as caretaker coach but he could not save Zambia's campaign as South Africa grabbed the only ticket to France ‘98 in the group.

Ndhlovu then went back to Mufulira to help out at Wanderers and took a low profile until 2000 when he contested the FAZ presidency but lost to Evaristo Kasunga by a landslide margin. He returned to Wanderers as coach and cleared out most of the old guard in preference for youth and paid the price when Wanderers were thrashed 5–0 at home by Zanaco in the first game of the season. When Wanderers’ went 9 games without a win, he was relieved of his duties and replaced by George Lwandamina. At the end of the season, Wanderers were relegated from the Premier league but were saved by a boardroom decision when Rail Express FC, one of the teams that finished above them was disbanded so they continued in the top league.

== Other Sports ==
Ndhlovu was more than a footballer but was an all-round sportsman. According to former FAZ General Secretary Bennet Simfukwe, Ndhlovu was Northern Rhodesian champion in long jump, high jump and pole vault, and Ndhlovu, Simfukwe and Owen Nkhama were the only black African members of the 1961 Northern Rhodesian basketball team that toured Southern Rhodesia and other British colonies. He was also a good boxer but decided it was rough and switched to soccer and joined Mufulira Mine Team.

Ndhlovu was also an accomplished golfer, a single figure handicap with a consistent and athletic swing. He was a popular member of Mufulira Golf Club and served on the management committee for many years. At a time when Zambians were in the minority in the club as a consequence of financial limitations, he was notable for his support of talented young Zambian golfers.

== Death ==
Ndhlovu first experienced poor health in February 2000 when he collapsed during a training session at Central Sports Stadium in Mufulira.

In February 2001, he underwent an operation to remove a tumour from his large intestine but his battle with cancer continued until he succumbed and died at Malcolm Watson Hospital in Mufulira on 10 October 2001.

Activities in Mufulira came to a standstill as several former and present Wanderers players were joined by other mourners in paying their last respects to the footballer called "Zoom." After a requiem mass at Shinde Stadium, he was put to rest at Chatulinga Cemetery next to his daughter with a burial befitting that of a hero. He was survived by a wife and two sons.

In 2002, the Zambian season-opening Charity Shield was renamed the Samuel "Zoom" Ndhlovu Charity Shield in his honour.

== Honours ==
=== Club Honours ===
- Zambian League Title: 1963, 1965, 1966, 1967 and 1969
- Charity Shield: 1967 and 1968
- Castle Cup: 1965, 1966, 1968, 1971, 1973 and 1974
- Zambia Challenge Cup: 1967, 1968 and 1969
- Heinrich Cup: 1964, 1965 and 1968
- Champion of Champions Cup: 1974
- Super Castle Cup: 1965

=== National honours ===
Ndhlovu won some minor trophies with the national team:

- Rothmans International trophy: 1965, 1966 (3 match series with Kenya)
- Heroes Cup:1968 against Uganda
- Uganda Independence Cup: 1968

=== Individual honours ===
- Zambian Sportsman of the Year: 1964
- Insignia of Honour: 1973
- Order of Distinguished Service (2nd Division): 1988

=== Coaching Honours ===
- With Mufulira Wanderers as Coach or Technical Advisor
  - Zambian league title: 1966, 1967, 1976 and 1978
  - Charity Shield: 1967, 1968, 1976 and 1977
  - Castle Cup/Independence Cup/Mosi Cup: 1966, 1968, 1971, 1975 and 1976
  - Zambian Challenge Cup: 1967, 1968, 1969, 1978, 1984
  - Heinrich Cup/Chibuku Cup/Heroes and Unity Cup: 1968, 1976, 1985
  - Champion of Champions: 1976, 1977 and 1978

With LCS Gunners

- Botswana league title: 1994

Zambia National Team

- Jamhuri Cup: 1967 in Kenya
- Uganda Independence Cup: 1968
- SADCC Cup: 1990
- CECAFA Cup: 1991

== See also ==
- Zambian Cup
- Cup of Zimbabwe
