= Roan United F.C. =

Zambian football club

Roan United
- Full name: Roan United Football Club
- Nickname: Stylish
- Founded: 1962
- Ground: Kafubu Stadium, Luanshya
- Capacity: 8,000
- Chairman: Tigomezge Botha
- Manager: Satchmo Chakawa
- League: FAZ National League
- 2025: 9th
Home colours

Roan United is a Zambian football club based in Luanshya, in the Zambian Premier League and mostly successful during the early years of Zambian football. They were the inaugural winners of the ZPL, clinching what was then called the Northern Rhodesia National Football League in 1962. They play their home matches at Kafubu Stadium. On 2 May 2026, Roan United beat Forest Rangers 5 - 1 at Kafubu Stadium to secure a return to the top tier of Zambian Football with a game to spare in the league. Roan, Roan. United!

== History ==
=== Early years: (1935–1961) ===
Bisa Gallants

At the establishment of the Roan Antelope Copper Mine in 1927, African soccer was organised on tribal lines. One such team in Roan Township was Bisa Gallants which initially comprised members of the Bisa ethnic group from Northern Zambia. It was this team that became the nucleus of the African football club that the Roan Mine Compound Manager Mr. Cecil F. Spearpoint put together to form Roan Mine team.

==== Roan Mine African Football Club ====
The earliest organised African mine soccer team was formed in the early 1930s shortly after the opening of the Roan Antelope Copper Mine. This team was a merger of tribal teams that played gruesome non-league soccer games that were often concluded with fist battles to define tribe superiority. Ben Evans, the European Welfare Officer in charge of African Affairs was behind this merger. In 1935 Roan Mine was affiliated to the Copperbelt African Football Association which was divided into three leagues (A, B and C). They competed against Chingola Eleven Wisemen, Luanshya All Blacks, Kitwe Lions, Rhokana Mine, Ndola Black Follies and Mufulira Blackpool.

Roan Mine FC also excelled in the Colony Cup and the Chamber of Mines competitions, the only silverware of the time alongside the CAFA league.

==== Roan Antelope Callies Football Club (1929–1961) ====
During the colour bar (Northern Rhodesia equivalence of the apartheid system) there existed an all European side Roan Antelope Callies FC which played in the Congo Rhodesia Border Football Association and its successor Northern Rhodesia Football Association. They used Roan Soccer Field at mine recreation club.

=== Birth of Roan Antelope United ===
The two Roan teams were instrumental in pushing for multi-racial participation in football and the promotion of a national football league. In 1961 a select side from both teams challenged an all European side Mufulira United to a friendly game and won 1–0. An African player Ginger Pensulo scored the lone goal.

In 1962 Roan Antelope United FC was born. The same year the National Football League was inaugurated with Roan's player-coach Ron Patterson as its first chairman.

It had many African stars like Innocent ‘Mummy’ Malama, Dick Katongo, James Temani, Ginger Pensulo, Happy George Band,Kenny Banda, Augustine ‘Baba Gasto’ Bwalya, Happy George Banda, Apro Musengule, Fix Kalunga, Laskey Mwandu, Gibson Nkumba and Samuel Yasa.^{1}

From Roan Antelope Callies came Ron Patterson (the first NFL chairman), Frank Petler, John Flintham, Teddy Pyle, John Dismuss and Tony Castela. Castela was a former Portuguese player that had played in the 1958 World Cup qualifiers alongside the Mozambican Eusebio.^{2}

Providing leadership was a powerful multi-racial executive committee comprising Richard Howie (President), Bob Menzies (Vice President), Alex Hendry (chairman), Boniface Koloko (Secretary), Johnson Malama (Vice Chairman) and Edward Matale (Assistant Team Manager). Evans was Team Manager whilst Tony Castela took the double role of player coach. Also serving as a committee member was Sylvester Nkhoma, one of the charter members of Roan Mine African Football Club.^{3}

=== Inaugural NFL Champions ===
In 1962, Roan Antelope United won the championship of the inaugural National Football League season. The 1962 title remains their only one to date.

==== Trophy successes (1962–1963) ====
Roan won the 1962 Castle Cup beating Nchanga Sports 4–3. In the Heinrich Chibuku Cup Final they beat Rhokana United 2–1. The same year saw Roan becoming the first club to represent the country in an international competition – the Super Castle Cup. Winners of the Southern and Northern Rhodesia versions of the tournament competed for this cup. Roan lost 1 – 0 to Bulawayo Rovers at Barbourfields Stadium in Bulawayo.^{4}

In 1963, they were runners up for the league title won by Mufulira Wanderers but won the Heinrich Chibuku Cup with a 3–1 victory over Nchanga Rangers. Two teams were entered in the CAFA in which the first team were league champions and winners of the Chamber of Mines trophy. Similar honours were gained by the junior side.^{5}

=== Academy of Soccer Sciences ===
Roan are famed for producing great names in the history of Zambian football. The list of ex-Roan players reads like a Who's who in Zambian Soccer.

Three quarters of Zambia National team , Zambia Schools and Under 20 goalkeepers are traceable to Roan United and its reservoirs. There was Innocent ‘Mummy’ Malama , Happy Malama, Emmanuel Mwape, Vincent Chileshe, Kenny Mwape, Ghost Mulenga, Richard Mwanza, Simon Chande, Julius Chilambo, Laston Simpasa, Simon Kapende, Anderson Banda, Gibson Ngwira and Davies Phiri. Of all these the late Emmanuel Mwape still holds the record of having been voted the best goalkeeper on the continent in 1974 at the Africa Cup of Nations.

Most Zambian club success stories are linked to Roan United because of the players ‘poached’ from the club. Most them also played for Zambia. For instance Kabwe Warriors was at its best in the mid-1960s and '70s with ex-Roan stars: Sunday Kaposa, Boniface Simutowe, Godfrey Mpula, Phillip Tembo, Dyson Mugala, Francis Chilombo, Simon Kapende, Guards Sakala, Daniel Chileshe, Laskey Mwandu, Jack Chanda, Godfrey Munshya, Barry Kamfwa Kayuni, Moses Masuwa and Linos Chisanga.

Rhokana United enticed Fordson Kabole, Hudson Kamfwa Kasongo, Simon Chande, Bernard Chanda, Richard Mugala, Emmanuel Mwape and Gamma Mwelwa. Emmanuel Mwape's young brother Kenny Mwape served at Mufulira Blackpool, Green Buffaloes, City of Lusaka and Power Dynamos. Ndola United benefited through Kaiser Kalambo, John Mapulanga, and Silas Kanchule and Elias Simbeye.

Now defunct Kabwe United owed much of their success to Fabiano Mwaba and Anderson Banda. Kitwe United lured Happy Malama, Edward ‘VC 10’ Kalale and Stephen Makungu. Bancroft (now Konkola Blades) took on Savage Bulaya, Winter Chisenga and Wink Mwape. Nchanga Rangers benefited through John Silubonde, Morris Mwansa, Vincent Chileshe and Elijah Tana. Lusaka Tigers were glad to receive Gibbon ‘King’ Nyirongo who later exported his skills to Malawi with Bata Bullets.

Giant killers Strike Rovers would take on Brannel Stewart Jambila, Lasso Laimoni, Manasseh Jumbe and goalkeeper Aaron Mwape (another young brother to Emmanuel). Vitafoam befitted through the services of Richard Mwanza, Adrian Chota, Frank Mayekela, Abraham Liyembele and Lackson Chanda. Bruster Nsama and Peter Chanda were to raise Mpelembe FC to limelight whilst Laston Simpasa served Red Arrows and Green Buffaloes as goalkeeper. At Kafue Textiles Julius Chilambo together with Bernard Chanda propelled the team to limelight in the late 1980s.

== Honours ==
- Zambian Premier League: 1

1962

- Zambian Second Division: 1

2006

- Zambian Cup: 4

1962 – Roan United 4 Nchanga Sports 3
1977 – Roan United 3 Mufulira Wanderers 2
1994 – Roan United 1 Nkana Red Devils 0
1996 – Roan United 1 Nchanga Rangers 0

- Zambian Challenge Cup: 4

1962 – Roan United 7 Nchanga Sports 3
1974 – Roan United 2 Zambia Army 1
1983 – Roan United 2 Nkana Red Devils 0
1995 – Roan United 3 Mufulira Wanderers 0

- Heinriches Chibuku Cup: 2

1963 – Roan United 3 Nchanga Rangers 1
1966 – Roan United 2 Rhokana United 1
