= Vincent Chileshe =

Zambian coach and former goalkeeper (born 1957)

Personal information
- Date of birth: 17 February 1957 (age 69)
- Place of birth: Mporokoso, Northern Rhodesia
- Position: Goalkeeper

Youth career
- 1969–1972: Kalala Amateur Football Club

Senior career*
Years	Team	Apps	(Gls)
1972–1975	Luanshya All Blacks		
1975–1980	Roan United		(1)
1981–1984	Nchanga Rangers		
1984–1987	Zesco United		

International career
1977–1985	Zambia	30	(0)

Managerial career
- 1986–1989: Zesco United
- 1990–1992: Police Leopards
- 1992–1994: Manzini Wanderers FC
- 1995: Mbabane Swallows FC
- 1996–1997: Police XI
- 1997–1998: Nakambala Leopards
- 1998–2000: TAP Dragons
- 2000–2001: City of Lusaka
- 2002–: Young Green Eagles
- * Club domestic league appearances and goals

Vincent Chileshe is a Zambian coach and former goalkeeper. He was crowned Zambian player of the year in 1977 at the age of 20, the first goalkeeper to achieve that feat, and was in goal for Zambia at CAN 1978. He is currently coaching Zambian Division 2 side Young Green Eagles.

== Early life ==
Chileshe was born in Mporokoso in 1957 and was among three goalkeepers in the family. His elder brother Richard played for Bancroft Blades (now called Konkola Blades) in the late 1960s while his younger brother Stephen was a reserve goalkeeper at Nchanga Rangers in the 1980s when Chileshe kept goal for the main team.

Besides playing for his school Ndelela Primary, Chileshe joined Kalala Amateur Football Club in 1969 at the age of twelve. He was inspired to become a goalkeeper by Mufulira Wanderers goalkeeper Tolomeo "Juva" Mwansa and while listening to football commentaries, Chileshe would tell his friends that he also wanted to be a national team goalkeeper and to be heard on radio.

== Playing career ==
Kalala also served as a nursery for the Luanshya All Blacks Football Club which he joined three years later as a reserve goalkeeper. He became a regular in 1975 by which time Roan United had developed interest in him.

He crossed over to Roan but it was not easy to win a regular place because national team goalkeeper Emmanuel Mwape was their number one choice and the reserve goalkeeper was Simon Chande who was equally good.

In 1976, Chande left Roan for Kitwe side Rokana United but after a short while, shifted camp to Kabwe Warriors. Because of this, Rokana lured Mwape to Kitwe which opened the door for Chileshe at Roan. Another break for Chileshe was the choice of Luanshya's TVT College as a camping venue for the national team and being the nearest club, Roan would be invited for practice matches leading to him being noticed by national team coaches. Before the end of the year, Chileshe who was also captain of the Zambia Schools team, was called to the national team.

He made his international debut on 26 March 1977 at the age of 19 in a friendly against Malawi which Zambia won 8–1 and he did enough to convince fans that a talented goalkeeper had arrived on the scene. Nicknamed "The Black Cat" he won the Zambian FA cup when Roan beat Mufulira Wanderers 3 – 2 in a thrilling final played at Independence Stadium and was in Zambia's team at the CECAFA tournament later that year. At the end of the season, Chileshe was the surprise choice for the footballer of the year award by the Football Association of Zambia (FAZ). Amid a lot of public discontent because fans felt the player was too raw and unknown to merit the top award, and that Godfrey Chitalu should have been the winner as he had done more on the pitch than any other player, and without him, Zambia would not have qualified to the 1978 CAN tournament. Chileshe was however backed by national team captain Ackim Musenge who said he deserved the award, rather than picking on old timers all the time. Chileshe himself said he did not expect the award but he was pleased that he had won it. "Like all the other players, I was rather surprised at my selection. We all thought one of the old guard would be given the award."

The young goalkeeper was in goal at CAN 1978 in Ghana where Zambia were eliminated after a defeat, a win and a draw against the hosts, Upper Volta and Nigeria respectively.

In September 1979, Chileshe surprised many fans when he featured as a centre-forward in a league match against Rokana United at Kafubu Stadium. Not only did he create the first goal scored by Zambani Sailota, he scored the second in a 3–0 win. Ironically, he scored past his predecessor Emmanuel Mwape. Unlike other Zambian goalkeepers who started out as strikers and later played as forwards after establishing themselves in goal, he had always been known to be a goalkeeper.

In 1981, Chileshe was loaned to league champions Nchanga Rangers to help them in their quest to win the African Club Champions Cup but disaster struck when Chileshe broke his right leg in the 85th minute of a league match against Mufulira Wanderers in April 1981 when he collided with Ashols Melu. Several Rangers players were in tears as their goalkeeper was carried off to the hospital Chileshe was ruled out for the rest of the season and this proved to be a blow to Rangers' continental cup aspirations as they were eliminated in the quarter-finals by Vita Club of Zaire 4–3 on aggregate in September.

When he recovered, Chileshe made the move to Rangers permanent but moved to Division I side Zesco United in 1984, helping them to a runners-up slot in the BP Challenge Cup, when they lost 2–0 to Mufulira Wanderers. Despite being on the losing side, Chileshe was voted man of the match after pulling off a string of brilliant saves. He was then recalled to the national team and was one of the reserve goalkeepers when Zambia emerged victorious at CECAFA 1984 and he described it as a very emotional moment because he had participated in 4 previous tournaments and they had always failed to finish first. He retired from international football soon after that, his last appearance for Zambia coming on 2 February 1985 in a friendly against Zimbabwe in Gweru.

== Coaching career ==
In 1986, Chileshe was appointed player-coach at Zesco and won them the 1986 Division I title and promotion to the premier league and also led them to another BP Challenge Cup runners-up slot when they lost to Division I side Zanaco in 1987.

In 1990, Chileshe decided to go to Swaziland where he coached various teams in a period of 5 years: Police Leopards, Manzini Wanderers and Mbabane Swallows. In 1996, he joined Botswana Police IX as coach for a year before heading back home. On his return in 1997, he was appointed coach for Division I Nakambala Leopards and led them to 4th position on the log. However, the team was caught up in sponsorship problems and he left to coach another Division I team TAP Dragons from 1998 to 2000 when he became coach for City of Lusaka.

Chileshe gave up the City job after being offered the goalkeeping coach's job for the Swaziland national team where he worked with Dodge Mahlahlela and Kinnah Phiri. Chileshe was in Swaziland until 2002 when his contract expired and is currently coaching FAZ Division II side Young Green Eagles in Kafue.
