= Ghost Mulenga =

Zambian footballer (1954-1985)

Joseph Mulenga, better known as Ghost Mulenga (January 6, 1954 – April 21, 1985) was a Zambian goalkeeper who played for Red Arrows and represented Zambia at CAN 1982. He was also in the team that won Zambia its first CECAFA Cup in Uganda in 1984.

== Playing career ==
Mulenga was born in Luanshya in 1954 and first played for a Second Division side Buseko FC where he was noticed by Boniface Simutowe and lured to Arrows in April 1975. Buseko also produced other great Zambian stars like Bernard Chanda and Patrick Phiri. He also featured for the Zambia Schools National team when he was at Mpatamatu Secondary School.

His agility earned him the nickname ‘Ghost’ which quickly became so popular that many Zambian soccer followers were not even aware of his real name. He went straight into the main team at Arrows and in his time with them, he won the Challenge Cup in 1982, the Heroes and Unity Cup in 1977, 1979 and 1981, and the Champion of Champions trophy in 1983.

== National team ==
Mulenga got his call-up to the national team in 1980 and was the reserve keeper at Moscow Olympic Games. His international debut came in December 1980 in a 1–1 draw with Kenya during that country's independence celebrations in Kisumu. He was in goal during Zambia's 2–0 win over Morocco in 1981, which saw the country through to CAN 1982 in Libya. He played a key role at the CAN as Zambia went up to the semi-finals only to lose a tough match against the hosts 2–1, with Mulenga being stretchered off in the 25th minute with a cut above the eye, after which the Libyans managed to get their two goals.

Mulenga was part of Zambia's first CECAFA Cup winning team in 1984 in Uganda though he did not see any action as Efford Chabala played all the games. His last game for Zambia was a 1–1 draw against Malawi on 23 March 1985.

== Death ==
In April 1985, Mulenga was in camp with the national team preparing for their second leg 1986 World Cup qualifier with Cameroun when he was taken ill and was found to be suffering from malaria. He missed the trip to Yaoundé and died on 21 April 1985 in Lusaka.
