= Emmanuel Mwape =

Zambian footballer (1950-1991)

- Mwape in Lusaka after arrival from the African Cup of Nations final in 1974

Personal information
- Date of birth: 6 October 1950
- Place of birth: Luanshya, Northern Rhodesia
- Date of death: 8 April 1991 (aged 40)
- Place of death: Chingola, Zambia
- Position: Goalkeeper

Youth career
- 1963–1966: Roan United F.C.

Senior career*
Years	Team	Apps	(Gls)
1967–1977	Roan United		
1977–1982	Rokana United		

International career
1968–1981	Zambia	50	(0)
- * Club domestic league appearances and goals

Emmanuel Mwape (1950 – 8 April 1991) was a Zambian footballer who is highly regarded as Zambia's best goalkeeper in history. Nicknamed ‘Mannix’, Mwape kept goal for Zambia at CAN 1974 and featured for Roan United and Rokana United. He was named Zambian Sportsman of the Year in 1974 and his younger brother Kenny also played in goal for Zambia in 1980.

== Playing career ==
Mwape was born 1950 and first played for Roan's youth team in 1963 team before breaking into the main team at the age of 17 while he was still a schoolboy, as understudy to Zambia national team goalkeeper Happy Malama. He featured for Zambia Schools and his impressive performances saw him being called to the senior national team the following year when he made his full international debut in a friendly against Uganda on 4 July 1968 at Kitwe’s Scrivener Stadium. It was an inauspicious start as he conceded two goals in the first 18 minutes after two poor clearances from him and he was replaced by Malama. Mwape was spared the blushes when Godfrey Chitalu’s double earned Zambia a 2–2 draw.

He was left out of the Zambia's tour of Uganda in October of that year but was back later that month as reserve goalkeeper for the World Cup qualifier against Sudan which Zambia won 4-2 but lost the second leg by the same score line and were eliminated due to a strange rule by FIFA which favoured the team that won the second leg in the event of a tie.

Mwape became Zambia's first-choice goalkeeper in 1971 although for the most part of 1973, coach Ante Buselic preferred Joseph Chomba of Zambia Army FC He was in goal as Zambia made an appearance at their first ever CAN tournament at Egypt 1974 and he played every minute of every game as they went all the way to the final only to lose 2–0 to Zaire after a replay. He was voted the best goalkeeper at the tournament by a panel of journalists after which Mwape said he deserved the award despite it being the first time he had taken part in a big tournament. Later that year, Mwape won the Challenge Cup with Roan and at the end of the year he was voted Zambia's Sportsman of the Year.

In 1975, he lost his place to Abraham Nkole but returned for the two legged World Cup qualifier against Uganda in February 1977. The following month, he was left out of the national team for failing to report to camp and his club revealed that he had been missing from Luanshya since featuring for Zambia against Uganda. It emerged in April that he had written to the club requesting a transfer. This was prompted by Roan's reluctance to give him chance to sit for his crafts training course at work which led to frustration. He then moved to Rokana United, and this led to the emergence of his understudy at Roan Vincent Chileshe who also took over at the national team. In 1980, Mwape's younger brother Kenny played in goal for Zambia giving the siblings a unique record. Mwape made a comeback when he captained a young Zambian team to the CECAFA tournament and the following year, he traveled to CAN 1982 as a reserve goalkeeper.

The following year, he quit playing for Rokana and joined the coaching staff under Moses Simwala. He later joined the coaching bench of Nchanga Rangers in 1989.

== Death ==
Mwape fell sick and died on 8 April 1991 at Nchanga South Hospital in Chingola.
