= Happy Malama =

Zambian footballer (born 1947)

Personal information
- Date of birth: 1947 (age 78–79)
- Place of birth: Luanshya, Northern Rhodesia
- Position: Goalkeeper

Youth career
- 1957–1962: Roan Youth Club

Senior career*
Years	Team	Apps	(Gls)
1962–1970	Roan United F.C.		
1970–1972	Chibuku Warriors		
1972–1974	Kitwe United		
1974–1975	Malaiti Rangers		
1976–1977	Tazama Pipelines		

International career
1965–1971	Zambia	21	
- * Club domestic league appearances and goals

Happy Malama (born 1947) is a former Zambian goalkeeper who played for Roan United and was in goal in Zambia’s first ever World Cup qualifier against Sudan in October 1968. He is often mistaken for Innocent “Mummy” Malama, another goalkeeper who featured for the national team prior to Zambia's independence. In 1970, Malama moved from Roan to Chibuku Warriors for what was then the record transfer fee in Zambian football.

== Early life ==
Malama was born in Luanshya and went to Makoma Primary School. He played as a goalkeeper in the Luanshya Youth League alongside future Zambian internationals and Roan United teammates Boniface Simutowe, Sandy Kaposa and Willie Chifita. At the age of thirteen, he started playing for the school team and continued doing so when he graduated to Luanshya Central School and when he completed his second year of secondary education, he left school to join Roan United's reserve team in 1962.

== Playing career ==
In 1963, Malama featured for Roan United's second reserve team and the following season, he made his debut for Roan aged seventeen on 9 September 1964, in a league match against Mufulira Wanderers at Shinde Stadium which Roan lost 3–1. Malama took over from his namesake Innocent “Mummy” Malama, the former goalkeeper for the Northern Rhodesian African national team and won many admirers with his agility. Despite his tender age, he was a safe pair of hands and won the nickname “Trustee.” His sharp reflexes also earned him the moniker “Cat” among Roan supporters.

Although standing at only 5 ft 6", Malama had excellent reflexes but also had some peculiar habits. A temperamental character, he often berated his defenders and if they did not follow his instructions he would sometimes put his point across by leaving the goal unguarded and allowing the opposition to score. His performances for Roan soon earned him a call-up to the national team but in April 1970, Malama left Roan to sign for Division I side Chibuku Warriors of Kitwe for K2,000, which was the record fee in Zambian football. At Chibuku, he also took on coaching duties as player-coach

He did not stay long at Chibuku, moving to Kitwe United in 1972 where he stayed for two seasons before leaving for Lusaka side, Zambia Electricity Supply Corporation (ZESCO)-sponsored Malaiti Rangers in 1974 where he was player-coach. When his mother died the following year, Malama decided to return to Luanshya and rejoin the mines but Roan were not interested in re-signing him because of his reputation of hardly staying with any club for a long time. He was thus discharged from the mines and went back to work for ZESCO but moved on shortly afterwards to join amateur side Tazama Pipelines in Ndola where he ended his playing career.

== National team ==
Malama made his national team debut on 12 September 1965 against Kenya in the opening game of the three-match of Rothman's Cup series in Ndola which ended in a 3–3 draw. He played in the second game as well, a 2–3 defeat but did not feature in the final game which Zambia won by the same score line.

He returned to man the posts for Zambia in 1967 when they lifted the Jamhuri Cup and the Heroes Cup against Kenya and Uganda respectively. He was in goal when Zambia played their first ever World Cup qualifier against Sudan which they won 4–2 in Ndola and featured in the second leg which Zambia lost by the same score but were eliminated by virtue of losing the second leg.

In October 1969, Malama quit the national team after a game against Daring Falcons Club of Zaire in which he fractured his wrist and no Football Association of Zambia official went to see him afterwards. He however made a comeback the following year and helped Zambia eliminate Tanzania from the CAN race 6–2 on aggregate. His last game for Zambia was a 4–3 defeat to Malawi on 18 March 1971 in a friendly match in Zomba. In all, he made 21 appearances for Zambia.

== Honours ==
=== Club ===
- Heinrich Cup: 1966

=== National team ===
Malama won a number of minor trophies with the national team:

- Rothmans International trophy: 1965, 1966 (3 match series with Kenya)
- Malawi Republic Cup: 1966
- Jamhuri Cup: 1967 in Kenya
- Heroes Cup:1968 against Uganda
- Uganda Independence Cup: 1968
- Independence Cup: 1968 against Tanzania
- Peter Stuyvesant Trophy:1969 (3 match series with Malawi)
- BAT Independence Trophy: 1969 (3 match series with Daring Faucons of Congo DR)
