= Mthokozisi Dube =

South African soccer player (born 1992)

Personal information
- Full name: Mthokozisi Evans Dube
- Date of birth: 10 September 1992 (age 34)
- Place of birth: Germiston, South Africa
- Height: 1.71 m (5 ft 7 in)
- Position: Defender

Senior career*
| Years | Team | Apps | (Gls) |
| 2012–2013 | Roses United | 20 | (1) |
| 2013–2015 | Royal Eagles | 47 | (0) |
| 2015–2017 | Bloemfontein Celtic | 41 | (0) |
| 2017–2022 | Orlando Pirates | 31 | (1) |
| 2020–2022 | → Lamontville Golden Arrows (loan) | 41 | (0) |
| 2023 | Royal AM | 7 | (1) |
- * Club domestic league appearances and goals as of 27 March 2024

Mthokozisi Evans Dube (born 10 September 1992) is a South African soccer player who last played for Royal AM.

Dube is known for his time at Orlando Pirates. He was loaned out to Lamontville Golden Arrows during the 2020–21 season before agreeing to another season in 2021–22. He was released by Orlando Pirates in 2022, and spent some time without a club before training with and subsequently joining Royal AM.
