= George Lwandamina =

Zambian footballer and coach (born 1963)

Personal information
- Date of birth: 5 August 1963 (age 63)
- Place of birth: Mufulira, Northern Rhodesia
- Position: Defender

Team information
- Current team: Zambia (caretaker)

Youth career
- 1981–1983: CISB

Senior career*
Years	Team	Apps	(Gls)
1984–1985	Mutondo Stars		
1985–1986	Mufulira Blackpool		
1986–1995	Mufulira Wanderers		

International career
1987–1989	Zambia		

Managerial career
- 1997–2000: Mufulira Wanderers
- 2002–2009: Green Buffaloes
- 2009–2010: Kabwe Warriors
- 2010: Zambia (caretaker)
- 2011–2014: Red Arrows
- 2014–2015: ZESCO United
- 2015–2016: Zambia
- 2016–2018: Young Africans
- 2018–2020: ZESCO United
- 2020–2021: Azam
- 2022: Kabwe Warriors
- 2026–: Zambia (caretaker)
- * Club domestic league appearances and goals

George Lwandamina (born 5 August 1963) is a former Zambian footballer and head coach of Nchanga Rangers. He had a brief playing career with Zambia and won several trophies as a defender with Mufulira Wanderers.

== Early life ==
Lwandamina was born and brought up in Mufulira's Kamuchanga township where his mother supported his love of football by buying him rubber footballs. His father died when he was ten years old so he was taken in by his aunt who lived in Kitwe's Wusakile township, where one of the teachers at Wusakile Primary School spotted him playing football and got him a place at the school and he started playing for the school team as a striker.

He later moved to Justin Kabwe Primary School but had to stop school in the 5th grade as he had no one to pay his school fees. During this time, he worked on his soccer skills and when he resumed his education, he went straight to the final grade and easily passed the exams to qualify to Ndeke Secondary School.

His two-year absence from the class room motivated him to complete his schooling and dispel the notion that footballers are dull so he took his studies seriously and stayed away from football. However, the school's Sports Master soon discovered that he had a talented player who preferred not to play for the school so he invited Lwandamina to join the team but gave him a whipping first. Despite only being in the eighth grade, he was named captain ahead of his seniors and he ended up captaining his school team for the entire five years that he was at Ndeke Secondary.

== Club career ==
Lwandamina earned call-ups to the Copperbelt and Zambia Secondary Schools teams and his leadership qualities were recognized as he later became a prefect at Ndeke Secondary, where his school-mates nicknamed him "Chicken" after cock fighter Chicken George in Alex Haley's Roots. With his interest in soccer re-ignited, he joined amateur side CISB where he played with Kenneth Malitoli and Kapambwe Mulenga, and would visit his mother in Chingola during the school holidays, where he would feature for Chiwempala Leopards.

During his final year in school in 1984, Lwandamina received a lot of offers from clubs within Kitwe but opted to join Mutondo Stars which was being coached by Fordson Kabole. The day after completing school, he went back to Mufulira and rather than join Wanderers, he chose to join their rivals Mufulira Blackpool as he was keen on following Kalusha Bwalya's route to stardom, and he was well received at John Yumba Kachofa Stadium.

After a season at Blackpool, Lwandamina fulfilled his dream and moved to Shinde Stadium in 1986 and though Bwalya and Charles Musonda had left to pursue professional careers in Belgium Wanderers still had a formidable team under coach Ackim Musenge with the likes of Ashols Melu, Efford Chabala, Philemon Mulala, Evans Mulala, Emmanuel Munaile and Lackson Manda. When Melu left to join Olympiacos in Greece, Lwandamina took over the captain's armband and though Wanderers won a lot of cups, the league title eluded them. During his time at Wanderers, he won the Mosi Cup, the Challenge Cup, the Heroes and Unity trophy and the Champion of Champions Cup.

He later suffered a knee injury in 1992 which hampered him for almost three years, as he had to rely on binding the knee and pain-killing injections until he was forced into retirement in 1995.

== International career ==
In November 1987, Lwandamina was called up to the national team by Samuel "Zoom" Ndhlovu as Zambia prepared to take part in that year's CECAFA Cup tournament in Ethiopia, though he was left out of the final team.

He returned to the squad for the following year's CECAFA edition in Malawi and made his debut in a match against Ethiopia which ended in a goalless draw and Zambia went all the way to the final only to lose 3–1 to Malawi after extra time.

His brief career with the national team ended with a 1990 World Cup qualifier against Morocco in Rabat in January 1989, which Zambia lost 1–0.

== Managerial career ==
=== Mufulira Wanderers ===
Soon after he quit playing, Lwandamina was appointed Assistant Coach to Melu at Wanderers in 1995 and the team won its first league title in 17 years which they retained the following year. After attending a coaching course in Germany, he took over the reins at Wanderers when Melu died in January 1997.

Wanderers reached the quarterfinals of the African Club Champions Cup where they lost to Egyptian club Zamalek and relinquished the league title to Power Dynamos though they managed to win the BP Challenge Cup.

=== Green Buffaloes ===
With Wanderers beset by financial problems, Lwandamina left for Nchanga Rangers in 2000 and was in charge of the youth programme but he did not stay there for long as he quit to become Peter Kaumba's assistant at Green Buffaloes in 2001, and when Kaumba left the army club the following year, Lwandamina was elevated to the head coach's position and they finished third in the league. He led Buffaloes to the runners-up slot in 2003, 2004, 2006 and 2007.

=== Kabwe Warriors ===
After a third-place finish in 2008, Buffaloes' management decided to part ways with Lwandamina and he moved to Kabwe Warriors in 2009, but he left the following season with club management unhappy that he was spending far too much time at the national team where he was assistant coach.

=== Red Arrows ===
After spending some time as Youth Coordinator at the Olympic Youth Development Centre in Lusaka, Lwandamina took over at Red Arrows and achieved a second-place finish in 2011, followed by the Barclays Cup and 4th place in the league in 2013. This was deemed not good enough by the team's management despite the cup triumph being their only piece of silverware since their solitary league win in 2004, and Lwandamina's contract was terminated.

=== ZESCO United ===
Ndola giants ZESCO United wasted no time in signing Lwandamina in 2014, and he won the league and cup double in his first season, retaining the league the following year. He also won back to back Zambian Coach of the Year awards.

== National team coaching career ==
Lwandamina, who has attended coaching courses in Germany and the Netherlands, first served as Zambia U-20 national team coach from 2003 to 2008 during which time he won the COSAFA title. In 2007, he guided the team to the semi-finals of the Africa Youth Championship and subsequent qualification to the World Youth Cup in Canada where Zambia reached the round of 16.

He first served as assistant national team coach under Kalusha Bwalya in 2005 to 2006, when Patrick Phiri took over. He returned to work under Hervé Renard, and briefly took over for a friendly against South Africa in January 2009, when Renard refused to accompany the team. When Renard quit the Zambian job the first time in 2010, Lwandamina took over the team as interim coach in an unsuccessful two match reign that ended in failure to qualify to the 2011 tournament.

After Honour Janza was fired in May 2015, five days before a 2017 qualifier against Guinea-Bissau, Lwandamina was named Zambian coach and though he started with a disappointing 0–0 draw, he was given a vote of confidence by then FAZ boss Kalusha Bwalya after getting an away win in Kenya and then qualifying Zambia to the 2016 African Nations Championship.

At the 2016 African Nations Championship in Rwanda, Zambia topped their group, but fell out at the quarter-final stage after losing to Guinea on penalties.

Although the FAZ had intimated that Lwandamina would be given a contract, he continues to operate without one and doubles as ZESCO United coach.

== Honours ==
=== As player ===
Mufulira Wanderers

- Independence Cup: 1988
- Shell Challenge Cup/BP Challenge Cup/BP Top Eight Cup: 1986, 1994,
- Heinrich Cup/Chibuku Cup/Heroes and Unity Cup: 1987, 1988, 1991
- Champion of Champions Cup: 1985, 1988, 1992

=== As coach ===
Red Arrows

- Barclays Cup: 2013

ZESCO United

- Zambian Super League: 2014, 2015
- Barclays Cup: 2014

=== Individual achievements ===
- Zambian coach of the year: 2014, 2015
