= Bwalya =

Bwalya is a common name used in various African countries, especially in Zambia.

== People with the surname ==
- Benjamin Bwalya (1961–1999), Zambian football manager and player
- Chanda Bwalya (born 1986), Zambian football player
- Felix Bwalya (1970–1997), Zambian boxer
- Gillan Bwalya (born 1988), Zambian IM chess player
- Hastings Bwalya (born 1985), Zambian boxer
- Joel Bwalya (born 1972), Zambian football manager and former player
- Johnson Bwalya (born 1967), Zambian former football player
- Kalusha Bwalya (born 1963), Zambian former football player; former president of the Football Association of Zambia
- Larry Bwalya (born 1995), Zambian football player
- Lilian Bwalya (born 1974), Zambian sprinter
- Simon Bwalya (born 1985), Zambian football player
- Walter Bwalya (born 1995), Congolese football player

== People with the middle name ==
- Alexander Bwalya Chikwanda (born 1938), Zambian politician
- Christopher Bwalya Yaluma (born 1952), Zambian politician
- Geoffrey Bwalya Mwamba (born 1959), Zambian businessman and politician
- William Bwalya Miko (born 1961), Zambian painter

== People with the given name ==
- Bomb$hell Grenade (Bwalya Sophie Chibesakunda) (born 1987), Zambian rapper and singer
