= Thomas Bwalya =

Zambian footballer (1949–2023)

Personal information
- Full name: Thomas Bwalya
- Date of birth: April 11, 1949
- Place of birth: Mufulira, Northern Rhodesia
- Date of death: February 3, 2023 (aged 73)
- Place of death: Mufulira, Zambia
- Position: Midfielder

Youth career
- 1963-1964: Lubuto Welfare Centre

Senior career*
Years	Team	Apps	(Gls)
1964–1979	Mufulira Wanderers		
1979	Mufulira Blackpool (loan)		

International career
1968-1969	Zambia	1	(1)
- * Club domestic league appearances and goals

Thomas Bwalya (11 April 1949 – 3 February 2023) was a Zambian footballer who won several trophies with Mufulira Wanderers and is one of the club's most decorated players. Featuring as an attacking midfielder, he played a key role in Wanderers’ dominance in the sixties and seventies and also represented Zambia. He was the younger brother of another Wanderers and Zambia forward Willie Kunda.

== Early life ==
Bwalya was born in Mufulira where his father Thomas Chipayeni worked as a miner and had also played football for Mufulira Tigers, now known as Mufulira Blackpool.

The second born in a family of eight, Bwalya grew up in Section Five of the mine township where he began playing football at Lubuto Welfare Centre, while at Kankoyo Primary School. He later attended Kantanshi Secondary School. His elder brother Willie Kunda also played football and was the first to join Wanderers’ reserve side.

At Kankoyo, Bwalya earned the nickname ‘Castella,’ after Portuguese midfielder António Castela, who starred for Luanshya club Roan United in the early days of the Zambian league. Wanderers’ coaches watched him play for Lubuto and invited him to join the Zambian league champions’ reserve side at the age of 15, together with Sandford Mvula and Edward Musonda.

Kunda, who was the league's leading goal scorer, had reservations about playing in the same team as his younger brother but coach Samuel ‘Zoom’ Ndhlovu stood by the younger sibling's side and informed Kunda he was free to move to another club if he wished, and both brothers ended up staying at Wanderers.

== Club career ==
Bwalya made his debut for Wanderers in 1966 season in a friendly against Roan United at Roan Playing Fields in Luanshya. Playing as a right winger, he upstaged his elder brother Kunda by scoring the second goal in a 2–0 win.

Later that year, Kunda's career came to a premature end while Bwalya's continued to progress’ helping the Shinde outfit retain the league title and by 1967, he was a fully-fledged member of the Wanderers first team, going on to win several domestic trophies.

Finding it difficult to balance school with the demands of playing for a top football club, Bwalya dropped out in the tenth grade to focus on his career at Wanderers, where the coaches felt that the tricky and nimble-footed Bwalya was better suited in the middle of the pitch so he was moved to inside-right and sometimes played as a center-forward. He cemented his place in the team and went on to play a key role in Wanderers’ success and as he grew in stature, soccer commentator Dennis Liwewe nicknamed him ‘Mosquito’ because of his slender frame and long legs. Bwalya almost joined City of Lusaka on the promise of a job but when Wanderers club officials heard about it, they quickly moved in and he was employed him as a Safety Officer at Mufulira mine.

He was an ever-present in the Wanderers line-up and weighed in with a fair number of goals from midfield, scoring 30 goals in all competitions in 1969, 42 in 1970, 20 in 1971 and 36 goals in 1974.

He took over as captain from Dickson Makwaza in 1974 and that same season lifted the Champion of Champions trophy after a 2–0 win over local rivals Mufulira Blackpool, and the Castle Cup when they defeated Rhokana United 2–1 in a hard-fought battle. He would go on to win won two more league titles in 1976 and 1978.

In 1977, Wanderers faced Algerian club Mouloudia Club d'Alger in the quarter-finals of the African Cup of Champions Clubs and after losing the first leg 2–1 in Algiers, Bwalya scored the first goal as Wanderers won the second leg 2–0 in Ndola to become the first Zambian club to make it to the semi-finals of the continental competition. Bwalya starred when he scored a hat-trick in Wanderers 5–2 triumph over Ghana's Hearts of Oak in the semi-final first leg match in Lusaka but they lost the second leg by three unanswered goals to bow out on away goals.

Bwalya's influence saw him being nominated for the 1977 African Footballer of the Year award and he came out 5th in the voting, which was won by Tunisia's Dhiab Tarek.

The following season, Bwalya won the league, the Challenge Cup and the Champion of Champions trophy and he featured in the team that made it to the African Cup Winners' Cup semifinals where they lost to Algerian side Nasr Athlétique de Hussein Dey after winning the first leg 2-1 and losing the second leg 1–0 to once again bow out on away goals once again.

In March 1979, Bwalya missed Wanderers 4–0 victory away to Tanzania's Simba in the first leg of their Africa Champions Clubs Cup second round tie with a knee injury and with the second leg seemingly a foregone conclusion, the team's management interfered with team selection and forced Bwalya to play, although he was still recovering from his injury. It was also decided to move the match to Lusaka.

The result was a devastating 5-0 reversal as Wanderers bowed out in humiliation. It turned out to be Bwalya's last game for the club as the emergence of younger players like Willie Mukwasa, Evans Katebe and Tshikala Mwanza, limited his opportunities. In his time at Wanderers, he won f0ur league titles, six Castle Cups, four Challenge Cups, two Heinrich Cups, four Champion of Champions Cups and four Charity Shields.

In July 1979, Bwalya was loaned to Wanderers’ struggling townmates Mufulira Blackpool who were bottom of the table and looking to avoid relegation. The loan deal was supposed to be up to the end of the season but with Bwalya still working for Mufulira mine, his employers chose not to release him from work early during the week so he was unable to train with his new team. As a result, he quit football in frustration after a few games.

== National team ==
Bwalya was called to the national team in May 1968 for friendly matches against foreign club side Leicester City. He featured for Zambia in a full international when they faced Tanzania for the Rothmans sponsored trophy in October of that year and scored a goal in the second of the two-match series which Zambia won 2–1 in Lusaka.

He featured again for Zambia against Congolese club side Daring Faucons in a three-match series in October 1969 and scored twice as Zambia won the first game 4–1 at Ndola's Dag Hammarskjoeld Stadium. Soon after this match, Bwalya was one of three players who left the national team's camp at Luanshimba School. While Godfrey Chitalu left because he felt unwell, Bwalya and goalkeeper Tolomeo Mwansa decided to check into Nkana Hotel after an altercation with Kabwe Warriors’ players Sebastian Mutale and Kenny Banda over the captaincy of the squad.

According to Bwalya and Mwansa, the two Warriors’ players felt that instead of Wanderers’ Dickson Makwaza, the Zambian captain should have come from their club, since they had contributed six players to the team, which angered the two Wanderers players and words were exchanged. Not wanting the matter to escalate into a fight, Mwansa and Bwalya then left to spend the night at Nkana Hotel, after reporting the matter to Vice-president Jethro Ngwane. However, the three players were deemed to have absconded and were suspended for the rest of the season. It turned out to be Bwalya's last appearance with the national team.

== Life after retirement ==
Bwalya served as Wanderers’ administrative manager between 2002 and 2005 but stopped watching football matches at Shinde Stadium after he and other former players were accused of being behind the team's poor run of form in Division I.

“I do not go to Shinde Stadium anymore," Bwalya said in an interview in 2012. “People misbehave. They say we do not want the team to win. They say we have juju and have bewitched the team.”

== Personal life ==
Bwalya was married to Beatrice Kampansa and they had eight children together. His wife was a sitting councilor in David Kaunda Ward in Mufulira's Kantanshi Constituency when she died in January 2021 after illness.

In 2022, Bwalya started experiencing poor health and was afflicted with a chest infection from which he never recovered, and he died on 3 February 2023.

== Honours ==
- Zambian League Championship: 4

1967, 1969, 1976, 1978

- Zambian Cup (Castle Cup/Independence Cup/Mosi Cup): 5

1968, 1971, 1973, 1974, 1975

- Zambian Challenge Cup (Shell Challenge Cup/BP Challenge Cup/ BP Top Eight Cup): 4

1967, 1968, 1969, 1978

- Heinrich Cup/Chibuku Cup/Heroes and Unity Cup: 2

1968, 1976

- Champion of Champions Cup: 4

1974, 1976, 1977, 1978

- Zambian Charity Shield: 4

1967, 1968, 1976, 1977
