= David Chabala =

Zambian footballer (1960-1993)

Efford Chabala
- Chabala in 1990

Personal information
- Full name: David Efford Chabala
- Date of birth: 2 February 1960
- Place of birth: Mufulira, Northern Rhodesia
- Date of death: 27 April 1993 (aged 33)
- Place of death: Atlantic Ocean, off Gabon
- Height: 5 ft 11 in (1.80 m)
- Positions: Goalkeeper; striker

Youth career
- 1975–1977: Lubuto Amateur Football Club

Senior career*
Years	Team	Apps	(Gls)
1978–1991	Mufulira Wanderers	643	(0)
1991–1992	Argentinos Juniors	1	(0)
1992–1993	Mufulira Wanderers		

International career
1983–1993	Zambia	115	(0)
- * Club domestic league appearances and goals

David Efford Chabala (2 February 1960 – 27 April 1993), popularly known as Efford Chabala was Zambia's first choice goalkeeper from 1983 until his death in a plane crash off the Gabonese coast in 1993 and is one of Zambia's most capped players, with 108 full international appearances. Chabala was instrumental in Zambia's first ever East and Central African Championship success when he saved three penalties in Zambia's 3–0 shoot-out victory over Malawi in the 1984 final in Uganda after a goalless draw at full-time. He was named Zambia's Sportsman of the Year in 1985.

== Playing career ==
Chabala was born in Mufulira where his father was a miner, the fourth born in a family of 12. He started out as a striker and played for Lubuto Amateur Club in Mufulira where his career in goal started by accident at the age of 17. During a practice session, the regular goalkeeper was absent so Chabala was forced to man the posts by his colleagues. He reluctantly agreed but played so well and enjoyed playing in goal that he decided to make the switch permanent.

In no time, he was recruited as Mufulira Wanderers' reserve goalkeeper by coaches Samuel Ndhlovu and Dickson Makwaza. He soon succeeded Bernard Kabwe in the first team, making his debut on 27 July 1980 in a league encounter against Lusaka Tigers at Shinde Stadium in Mufulira. With Wanderers trailing 2–0 at half-time, Chabala replaced Kabwe and the 'Mighty' men went on to win the match 3–2.

Chabala played in goal for the Wanderers side which also featured other top players like Ashols Melu, Kalusha Bwalya, Frederick Kashimoto, brothers Philemon Kaunda and Philemon Mulala, and later Charles Musonda and Johnson Bwalya. This Wanderers side dominated Zambian cup competitions during the eighties and early nineties, earning the tag 'legendary cup fighters.' However, Wanderers never won the Zambian league championship during this period.

He was voted Zambian Sportsman of the Year in 1985 and in the 1988 season, he surprised many Zambian soccer purists by donning a striker's jersey for Wanderers, but he went on to score five goals, including the third goal when Wanderers beat Roan United 3–0 in the Independence Cup final in October. He thus followed in the footsteps of another great Wanderers goalkeeper Abraham Nkole, who scored a hat-trick in the final of the same competition in 1971. Chabala reverted to goalkeeping but reprised his striker's role again in the 1990 season for a few more games after which he went back between the posts.

He had a brief spell in Argentina with Argentinos Juniors during the 1991/92 season but he returned to Wanderers in March 1992 claiming the conditions of his contract were unsatisfactory, and the club were not willing to change them.

In December 1992, Chabala was substituted in the Independence Cup final against Nkana Red Devils after he conceded three goals when Wanderers were leading 2–0 but went on to lose 3–2. He was disillusioned by stories that he was unhappy at the appointment of Ashols Melu as Wanderers assistant coach and therefore sold the game. Both Melu and Chabala denied any rift between them, saying they were great friends and Chabala said he was just off-form on the day and his substitution came a bit too late. He was left out of Wanderers’ next five matches but soon regained his position.

== National team ==
Chabala's performances between the posts for Wanderers were noticed by national team selectors leading to his first appearance in national colours on 27 November 1980 for the Zambia ‘B’ team in a Council for East and Central African Football Associations (CECAFA) Cup 3rd and 4th play-off game against Malawi which Zambia lost 1–0.

However, his full international debut was to come on 10 April 1983 in a CAN qualifier against Sudan in Khartoum, which Zambia lost 2–1. From then on, Chabala was a permanent fixture in the Zambian goal for the better part of the next 10 years.

He led Zambia to the 1984 CECAFA Senior Challenge Cup when he saved 3 penalties in the 3–0 penalty shoot-out win against Malawi after a goalless draw in normal time. Chabala was in goal for Zambia in their ill-fated attempt at winning the African Cup of Nations in 1986{link} where Zambia was knocked out in the group stages.

Chabala's heroics against Ghana in 1987 during an Olympic Games qualifier helped secure Zambia a slot at the 1988 Seoul Olympic Games. Zambia had won their home leg 2–0 and travelled to Accra with the home fans expecting their team to carry the day. Ghana attacked from the word go, throwing everything at the Zambians who despite conceding a first half goal by Tony Yeboah, held on to qualify 2–1 on aggregate with man of the match Chabala pulling out all the stops, including saving a penalty from Emmanuel Quarshie.

After the game, the Ghanaian goalkeeper ran over to Chabala and asked him what his secret was and Chabala's bemba reply became legendary in Zambian football circles – "Kuiposafye (You just have to throw yourself)."

At the Olympic Games, Zambia recorded some impressive results with Charles Musonda pulling the strings in midfield and Kalusha Bwalya in devastating form, drawing with Iraq 2–2 and brushing aside Italy and Guatemala by 4–0 scorelines to progress to the quarter finals. However, disaster struck in the quarter-final match against West Germany when Zambia was trounced 4–0, with Jürgen Klinsmann in fine form.

Despite that disappointment, many in Zambia believed the team finally had the quality players to make it to the 1990 World Cup in Italy. After winning all their home games, Zambia failed to get a result away from home and did not qualify for the World Cup.

Chabala made another appearance at the 1990 African Cup of Nations where journalists voted him the best goalkeeper at the tournament, keeping four clean sheets in five games and helping Zambia to third place. His last appearance at the Nations Cup was in 1992 in Senegal where Zambia yet again underachieved, falling 1–0 to eventual winners Ivory Coast in extra-time at the quarter-final stage.

On 20 December 1992, Zambia lost a World Cup Qualifier to Madagascar 2–0, a result which put their qualification campaign in a precarious position. Chabala was consequently dropped from the team and he missed Zambia's next two qualification games. He however said he was not surprised by the action and charged that he was paying the price for expressing his opinion prior to the Football Association of Zambia elections that the leadership should not change hands, which did not go down well with new President Michael Mwape. Mwape in turn responded that Chabala was dropped after reports that he was on suspension at his club, relating to the Independence Cup final loss to Nkana. Wanderers clarified that Chabala had served a 5 match suspension which had lapsed long before the Madagascar game. After this, FAZ cleared him to play for Zambia again and he promptly got back his position in the national team from his deputy Richard Mwanza.

== Death ==
On 27 February 1993, Zambia, needing a win to qualify to the group stages in the World Cup Qualifying campaign, swept aside Madagascar 3–1 in Lusaka. The Zambians were then drawn in the same group as Morocco and Senegal and many felt the time had come for Zambia to qualify to the World Cup as they had a very good team which had been together for a while, with coaching staff who seemed to inspire the team. On 10 April 1993, Zambia played out a goalless draw at home to Zimbabwe in an African Nations Cup qualifier. Two weeks later, the Zambians crushed Mauritius 3–0 in Port Louis with Chabala as captain and Kelvin Mutale grabbing a hat-trick.

From there, the team made its way to Senegal for the first of their World Cup qualifying games in the group stage. The team's transportation was a Zambia Airforce DHC-5D Buffalo plane. After refuelling in Libreville, the plane developed problems and plunged into the sea on 27 April 1993 killing all 30 people on board including Football Association of Zambia president Michael Mwape and airforce crew members. The entire nation was in shock and the scale of the tragedy sank in when 30 coffins holding the remains of their beloved team were flown in for a state burial. The plane crash brought an end to the career of not only Chabala but almost a whole team of talented Zambian players and coaches.

Chabala was survived by two wives Joyce and Petronella Mwamba Mulenga and six children, five from Joyce and one from Petronella (the son's name is Kalasa Efford David Chabala).

== Honours ==
- Zambian Cup (Independence Cup/Mosi Cup): 1988, 1995
- Zambian Challenge Cup (Shell Challenge Cup/BP Challenge Cup/ BP Top Eight Cup): 1984, 1986, 1994, 1996, 1997
- Heroes and Unity Cup: 1985, 1987, 1988
- Champion of Champions Cup: 1985, 1988, 1992
- Charity Shield: 1992, 1993

National Team

- CECAFA Cup: 1984
- MPLA trophy: 1986
- SADCC Cup: 1990

Individual Honours

- Zambian Sportsman of the Year: 1985

== See also ==
- List of men's footballers with 100 or more international caps
