= George Sikazwe =

Zambian footballer and coach (1938–2019)

Personal information
- Full name: George Sikazwe
- Date of birth: 1938
- Place of birth: Mutinte, Mbala District, Northern Rhodesia
- Date of death: 2 December 2019 (aged 81)
- Place of death: Kalulushi
- Position: Midfielder

Youth career
- 1952–1957: Mutende Youth Club

Senior career*
Years	Team	Apps	(Gls)
1957–1972	Mufulira Wanderers		

International career
1964–1968	Zambia	8	(0)

Managerial career
- 1972–1977: Mufulira Wanderers
- * Club domestic league appearances and goals

George Sikazwe (1938 – 2 December 2019) was a Zambian footballer and coach, who played for Mufulira Wanderers and Zambia as a midfielder, representing his country before and after independence. He also served as Wanderers' coach and together with Samuel ‘Zoom’ Ndhlovu, he is credited with masterminding the team's early success.

== Early life ==
Sikazwe was born in Mutinte village in Mbala district where his father Mwambatata Sikazwe was a peasant farmer. He was brought up in Luanshya by his uncle and he later moved to Mufulira to live with his elder sister Chitalu Nakazwe. He did his education at Mufulira Mine School where he went up to Standard Six after which he left school and joined Mufulira Mine.

He joined Mutende Youth Club and started playing football alongside future Wanderers teammates Samuel ‘Zoom’ Ndhlovu, Patrick Nkole and Elijah Mwale. In 1957, Sikazwe followed in Ndhlovu's footsteps by joining Mufulira Mine Team which went on to become Zambia's most successful team of all time.

== Playing career ==
When the Northern Rhodesia National Football League was formed in 1962, Mufulira Mine Team became Mufulira Wanderers and Sikazwe was a permanent fixture in the side as a wing-half. He won all the silverware in Zambian football and also helped Wanderers win the Inter-Rhodesia Castle Cup in Salisbury in October 1965.

Nicknamed 'Wikolo,' Sikazwe was also a basketball player and his job as a Welfare Officer in the mines saw him organizing sport among the youth in the various mine townships. In this way, he recruited several talented youngsters who would go on to contribute to Wanderers’ success.

He quit playing in 1972 and became Wanderers’ coach.

== National team ==
Sikazwe played for the national team before and after independence and was in the side that performed poorly during Zambia's independence tournament in October 1964 when the hosts lost all three games against Uganda, Kenya and Ghana. His last appearance for Zambia came against Mauritius in a CAN qualifier in Curepipe in December 1968 which Zambia won 3–2.

== Coaching career ==
Sikazwe was involved in coaching Wanderers as player-coach from about 1968 until he was named Wanderers’ permanent coach in 1972. He obtained his coaching qualifications in East Germany where he spent 8 months at the German College for Physical Education in 1973 and continued enjoying success as Wanderers’ coach with more titles heading to Shinde Stadium. He successfully oversaw the integration of younger players such as Roberston Zulu, Abraham Nkole, Evans Katebe, Brines Mulenga, Moses Kunda and Bernard Kabwe without loss of quality.

He also served as national team Assistant Coach to Ante Buselic and took charge of the team on occasion, as well as leading the Zambia ‘B’ side to the country's first ever East and Central Africa tournament in 1973, where the team failed to reach the knock-out round after losing a play-ff to Uganda national football team. He was part of the technical bench when Zambia participated in the CAN for the first time in Egypt in 1974 and they went all the way to the final only to lose to Zaire after a replay. He also took charge of the full national side at ECA 1974 where they reached the semi-finals.

He coached Wanderers until March 1977 when he was replaced by Dickson Makwaza, after concerns were raised about the team's lack of success in continental competitions so management sought to freshen up the technical bench. After leaving the Wanderers’ coaching job, Sikazwe was transferred to Kalulushi Mine in 1978 where he took over as Division II Kalulushi Modern Stars’ coach and changed the team's fortunes, leading them to the top league in 1983 where they remained for thirteen seasons with their best league placing coming in 1988 and 1992 when they finished in fourth place. Stars also got to the 1990 Independence Cup final which they lost 1–0 to Power Dynamos. He remained at Stars until he retired in 1993 and was succeeded by Jericho Shinde. His departure marked a decline in performances and Stars were demoted in 1995 when they ended the season second from bottom.

== Personal life ==
Sikazwe married Anedi Chiwaya in 1973 and they had ten children. When he retired from the mines in 1993, he settled on his farm in Chembe West in Kalulushi Farming Zone where he grew maize and groundnuts.

== Death ==
Sikazwe died on 2 December 2019, at the age of 81, after an illness.

== Honours ==
=== Mufulira Wanderers ===
- Zambian League Championship: 1963, 1965, 1966, 1967, 1969
- Zambian Cup: 1965, 1966, 1968, 1971
- Zambian Challenge Cup: 1967, 1968, 1969
- Heinrich Cup/Chibuku Cup/Heroes and Unity Cup: 1964, 1965, 1968
- Inter-Rhodesia Castle Cup: 1965

=== Zambia ===
- Mufulu Cup: 1964
- Malawi Republic Cup: 1966

=== As coach ===
- Zambian League Championship: 1976
- Zambian Cup: 1973, 1974, 1975
- Heinrich Cup/Chibuku Cup/Heroes and Unity Cup: 1976
- Champion of Champions Cup: 1974, 1976
