= Fighton Simukonda =

Zambian footballer and coach (1958–2016)

Personal information
- Date of birth: 2 February 1958
- Place of birth: Chingola, Northern Rhodesia
- Date of death: 15 February 2016 (aged 58)
- Position: Defender

Senior career*
Years	Team	Apps	(Gls)
1976–1978	Mimbula Diggers		
1978–1980	KB Davies		
1980–1982	Vitafoam United		
1982–1989	Nkana Red Devils		
1989–1991	Jomo Cosmos		
1991–1992	Blackpool		
1992	Dangerous Darkies		

International career
1983–1988	Zambia	36	(1)

Managerial career
- 1992–1993: Dangerous Darkies
- 1994–1999: Roan United
- 1998: Zambia
- 1999–2004: Konkola Blades
- 2004–2007: Zanaco
- 2007–2008: City of Lusaka
- 2008–2009: Lusaka Dynamos
- 2009–2011: ZESCO United
- 2011–2012: Nakambala Leopards
- 2012–2016: Nchanga Rangers
- 2015–2016: Zambia U23
- * Club domestic league appearances and goals

Fighton Simukonda (2 February 1958 – 15 February 2016) was a Zambian coach and former footballer. A defender, was part of the Nkana Red Devils side of the 1980s, winning five league titles, and he also captained Zambia. As a coach, he won several Zambian Premier League titles and became the first coach to lead a Zambian club to the group phase of the CAF Champions' League.

== Club career ==
Simukonda was born in Chingola where he started his football career with Division II side Mimbula Diggers as a defender. He later moved to Diggers' town mates KB Davies FC, another Division II team.

Standing at over six feet tall, he was a commanding presence in defence and in 1980, was recruited by Division I side Vitafoam United where he lined up with players like Ronald Mkandawire, Lackson Chanda, Michael Chabala and Boniface 'Killer' Chanda. The following season, Simukonda captained Vitafoam to a 2–1 Independence Cup final victory over Strike Rovers.

In 1982, Vitafoam proprietor Abram Mokola decided to give some senior players the opportunity to acquire coaching skills so Simukonda was one of five who were sponsored for a coaching course in England in March of that year. His fine defensive play caught the attention of Kitwe giants who signed him soon after his return from England and Vitafoam claimed he had breached his contract with them. The contract dispute kept him out of action for almost four months until the two teams agreed a compensation package.

Shortly after he joined Nkana, head coach Moses Simwala was suspended. Simukonda took charge of the team but he informed the club's management that while he was equal to the task, he was still an active player so Nkana great Stone Chibwe was brought in to hold fort. Credited with developing a tackle called the 'Chitemene system' after the slash and burn method of preparing fields in Northern Zambia, Simukonda won his first league title with Nkana going unbeaten the whole season and would go on to win four more in 1983, 1985, 1986 and 1988.

In the 1989 season, Nkana made it to the final of the Heroes and Unity Cup which was to be played at their home ground Nkana Stadium against Green Buffaloes on 9 July 1989. It seemed like an unfair advantage but Buffaloes were equal to the task and stunned the home side 1–0 via a late goal after Simukonda's mistake led to Christopher Chileshe's fierce drive which Nkana goalkeeper Dick Shonga failed to hold on to, allowing Donald Chandalala to stab the ball home. The Nkana team were so devastated by the loss of a game they had been expected to win that they collected their loser's medals and headed straight to the dressing rooms. This was interpreted as refusing to sing the national anthem so six of them were suspended, including Simukonda.

Simukonda explained afterwards "We did not refuse to sing the national anthem, we were just misunderstood. The dais was mounted near our dressing room so after collecting our losers' medals, we went straight to the dressing room to mourn our frustrations which authorities interpreted as refusing to sing the national anthem."

While still serving the ban, Simukonda left the country to ply his trade in South Africa, becoming the third Zambian player after Albert Bwalya and John Mwanza to play in the ostracised country due to apartheid, which also meant that he did not need an international clearance. He played for Jomo Cosmos for two years and then moved to Blackpool where he stayed for a season before joining Nelspruit-based Dangerous Darkies and played for them for a season and then ended his playing career.

== International career ==
Simukonda made his national team debut in October 1983 in an Olympic Games qualifier against Egypt in Lusaka which Zambia won 1–0 courtesy of a Peter Kaumba strike. From then on, he was a regular in the Zambian defence and was part of the team that won the country's first ever CECAFA Cup in Uganda in 1984 under Brightwell Banda.

Simukonda was in the Zambian team that defeated Cameroon 4–1 in a World Cup qualifier in Lusaka in April 1985 but missed out on the second leg as Banda preferred a central defensive pairing of Jones Chilengi and John "Butcher" Mwanza, which stood firm in a 1–1 draw.

He was left out of Zambia's CAN 1986 squad but made a comeback in December 1986 when he captained the team to a 1–0 win over Angola to lift the MPLA trophy in Luanda. He continued as captain when Samuel Ndhlovu took over as coach the following year and was in the Zambian team that pulled off a 2–1 aggregate win over Ghana to qualify to the Seoul Olympic Games.

The suspension of Zambia for pulling out of hosting the 1988 CAN finals saw Simukonda missing another tournament and as the Olympic Games approached, the central defensive pairing of captain Simukonda and his deputy Ashols Melu came in for some criticism, particularly when Zambia were beaten 4–0 by South Korea at the President's Cup tournament. This led to Simukonda being dropped for Zambia's dead rubber match against the Italian U-21 side. The game against South Korea turned out to be his last game for his country so it meant missing out on another major tournament by the time the Olympic Games came round.

== Coaching career ==
Simukonda took up coaching duties at Darkies in 1992 thanks to the course he had attended ten years prior to that. He made history when he took charge for part of the 1992 season with Darkies, managing a single win in 42 matches, conceding 122 goals in the process, which gave him the record of the worst coach in South African football history.

His dismissal at Darkies coincided with the re-admission of South Africa to the international fold so Simukonda returned to Zambia in 1992 and joined Roan United as assistant to Fordson Kabole, the man Simukonda describes as his mentor and when Kabole left Roan the following season to join Kabwe Warriors, Simukonda took over as head coach. Roan controversially lost to Mufulira Wanderers 4–0 in the 1994 final of the BP Top 8 Cup after conceding what looked like a couple of offside goals but they won the Mosi Cup and finished fourth on the log. He avenged Roan's defeat to Wanderers by beating the Mufulira side 3–0 in the following year's BP Top 8 Final and regained the Mosi Cup in 1996.

He was one of the assistant coaches at CAN 1998 where Zambia were knocked out in the first round and took charge of Zambia on an interim basis in 1998 and retained the COSAFA Cup but stepped down when Zambia drew their first CAN 2000 qualifier 1–1 against Congo DR in Lusaka.

After a patchy run of form early in the 1999 season, Simukonda was given a four-match ultimatum to start winning, beginning with Roan's ninth league game of the season, which ended in a draw and left Roan ninth in the league standings with three wins, three losses and two draws. This prompted management to terminate his contract and replace him with Paul Mulenga.

Two months later, Simukonda moved to Konkola Blades in Chililabombwe, whose coach Benjamin Bwalya had died in February, and transformed the border-town outfit into the most exciting team in the league. In June 2000, Zambia coach Jan Brouwer watched Blades knock Nchanga Rangers out of the BP Top 8 semi-final, 1–0, and immediately called for Simukonda's services, saying the kind of game Blades had exhibited was the type of play that was expected of the national team and he regretted that the national team's performance was a far cry from Blades' superiority.

Blades lost the final to Nkana, 6–1, and in 2002, Simukonda turned down the chance to coach Warriors where he would have had the opportunity of working with some of the biggest names in the league, to stay at Konkola Stadium, despite losing six key players including captain Kunda Mushota, John Munkonje, Aaron Kale and international Vincent Mangamu. "I have to show what I am made of. I have been through this before at Roan," he said.

After several mid-table finishes, Blades' style of play compelled Zanaco to lure him to the capital city in January 2004 on a two-year deal and his departure was lamented by Blades Secretary Remmy Ngosa who said "He is a very good coach. We will miss his services greatly."

Simukonda won back-to-back league titles at Zanaco in 2005–06 and won the coach of the year award in the process but when Zanaco failed to win a third successive premier league title, the club dispensed of Simukonda's services but City of Lusaka hired him in 2007. He served as assistant coach to Patrick Phiri at CAN 2008 though he moved to Lusaka Dynamos and laid down the ghosts of the 2000 final when he won the club its first ever trophy, the BP Top 8 Cup in 2008 with a 1–0 win over ZESCO United, the team which he joined in January 2009 and became the first coach to lead a Zambian club to the group stages of the CAF Champions League after a come-from behind 2–1 victory over Malian club Djoliba in Ndola after a goalless draw in the first leg. At the end of the season, he was rewarded with the Coach of the Year award.

He won the league title the following year and was rewarded with a new three-year contract in February 2011 and another Coach of the Year Award, but when ZESCO suffered some indifferent form, he was fired in July with ZESCO seventh on the Super Division table on 21 points, nine points behind leaders Red Arrows after 13 games played with two games in hand. Chairman Kenneth Muteto stressed that it was not an overnight decision. "Zesco have set standards in Zambian football which should continue." he said, "From a possible 18 points we picked up six. For a team of Zesco's stature that is not acceptable."

Nine days later, he was appointed coach of struggling Nakambala Leopards of Mazabuka but he discovered that the club did not match his ambition and he resigned after a year to join Nchanga Rangers on a three-year deal. Rangers chairman Blackwell Siwale said they were excited to have acquired the services of a top coach like Simukonda. "Fighton is a renowned coach, one of the top three or four in the country. Therefore, when you look at his CV we expect a lot from him."

He led Rangers to a sixth-place finish in 2012 and after a strong start in the 2013 season, Rangers ended up in third place. Fighton is assistant coach of the Zambia National team headed by George Lwandamina.

== Death ==
Simukonda died on 15 February 2016 after a battle with diabetes.

== Honours ==
=== As a player ===
- Zambian League Title: 1982, 1983, 1985, 1986, 1988
- Zambian Charity Shield: 1983, 1984, 1985, 1987, 1989
- Independence Cup: 1981, 1986
- Heinrich Cup/Chibuku Cup/Heroes & Unity Cup: 1983
- Champion of Champions: 1986

Zambia

- CECAFA Cup: 1984
- MPLA Trophy: 1986

=== As a coach ===
- Zambian Premier League: 2005, 2006, 2010
- Mosi Cup: 1994, 1996
- BP Top 8: 1995, 2008
- Coca-Cola Cup: 2004
- Barclays Cup: 2004, 2010
- Charity Shield: 2006, 2011
- COSAFA Cup: 1998

=== Individual ===
- Zambian Coach of the Year: 2005, 2009, 2010
