= Ashious Melu =

Zambian footballer and coach (1957-1997)

Ashols Melu
Personal information
- Full name: Ashious Jordan Melu
- Date of birth: 6 June 1957
- Place of birth: Chililabombwe, Zambia
- Date of death: 20 January 1997 (aged 39)
- Place of death: Zambia
- Position: Forward

Senior career*
| Years | Team | Apps | (Gls) |
| ?-1978? | Konkola Blades | | |
| 1978?-1989 | Mufulira Wanderers | | |
| 1989-1990 | Apollon Kalamarias | 5 | |
| ? | Olympiacos | | |
| ? | Favoritner AC | | |

International career
| 1986-1992 | Zambia | | |

Managerial career
- 1992: Mufulira Wanderers (assistant manager)
- 1992-1997: Mufulira Wanderers
- 1994: Zambia (assistant manager)
- * Club domestic league appearances and goals

Ashious Jordan Melu (6 June 1957 – 20 January 1997), also known as Ashios (or Ashols Melu), was a Zambian footballer and coach. Melu captained the Zambia national team from 1988 to 1992.

== Playing career ==
Melu was born in Chililabombwe on June 6, 1957, and attended Chililabombwe Secondary School. He began playing for the Konkola Blades before moving to Mufulira Wanderers in the late 1970s.

Melu played as a striker and was the top goal scorer in the Zambian league in 1983, scoring 43 goals, and winning the Zambian Footballer of the Year award.

Alongside Efford Chabala, Kalusha Bwalya, Frederick Kashimoto, Evans Katebe and the Philemon brothers (Philemon Mulala and Philemon Kaunda), and later Charles Musonda, Johnson Bwalya and Gibby Mbasela, Melu was part of Wanderers team, which was successful in cup competitions in the 1980s, though they never won the league championship.

At the beginning of the 1986 football season, Melu changed positions to a defender.

Melu represented Zambia at the African Cup of Nations in 1986, in which Zambia was eliminated in the first round.

In 1987, Melu won his second Footballer of the Year award. Notably, several other teammates had won the award, such as Kalusha Bwalya (1984) and Johnson Bwalya (1986). Efford Chabala missed out on the award but won the Sportsman of the Year trophy in 1985.

In 1988, Melu took over as Zambian captain when Fighton Simukonda was dropped after the President's Cup tournament in June in South Korea. Later in the year, Melu led the team to the Seoul Olympic games, in which Zambia became the first African country to reach the quarterfinals. In doing so, Zambia defeated Italy and Guatemala along the way with 4-0 scorelines and lost to West Germany by the same margin.

From 1989 to 90, Melu played five matches for the top division, Greek side Apollon Kalamarias.

Melu later played for an Austrian club for a year before returning to feature for Zambia at the Africa Cup of Nations in 1992 for his final appearance for Zambia. As a result, Melu was not part of the team that perished in the Gabon plane crash disaster the following year.

== Coaching career ==
In 1992, Melu turned to coaching and was first appointed assistant coach at the Wanderers, before taking over as head coach.

In 1994, he was named Zambia national team assistant coach to Roald Poulsen. He then led the Wanderers to back-to-back league championships in 1995 and 1996, achieving what he did not as a player - giving the Wanderers their first league success since 1978.

Before the beginning of the 1997 season, Melu fell ill and died in early 1997.
