= Philemon Chisala =

Zambian footballer (born 1966)

Personal information
- Date of birth: 11 November 1966 (age 59)
- Place of birth: Mufulira, Zambia
- Positions: Defender; midfielder

Youth career
- 1982-1985: Mutende Youth Club

Senior career*
| Years | Team | Apps | (Gls) |
| 1985–1987 | Kafironda Explosives FC | | |
| 1987–1994 | Mufulira Wanderers | | |
| 1994–1998 | Extension Gunners | | |

International career
| 1989–1990 | Zambia | | |
- * Club domestic league appearances and goals

Philemon Chisala (born 11 November 1966) is a former Zambian footballer who featured for Mufulira Wanderers in the late ‘80s and early ‘90s as a defender or midfielder. He also represented Zambia at the 1989 CECAFA Cup and CAN 1990.

== Early life ==
Chisala was born in Mufulira where his father Philemon Kapele worked as a miner for Zambia Consolidated Copper Mines (ZCCM) Mufulira Division. The fifth born in a family of ten, He grew up in Section 5 of Kantanshi, one of the mining areas in Mufulira. His younger brother Patson Kapele would also go on to play for Wanderers.

He attended Mufulira Mine and Kantanshi Secondary Schools where he played schools football, and joined Mutende Youth team before moving up to play club football.

== Playing career ==
Chisala joined FAZ Division II Kafironda Explosives in Mufulira in 1985 where the coach, former Mufulira Wanderers striker Benson “Swift” Musonda, played him in central defence. After almost three years at Kafironda, Chisala made the move to Wanderers towards the end of 1987 where he found Ashious Melu and George Lwandamina established in central defence so coach Ackim Musenge decided to play him at right-back in the upcoming season.

Occasionally featuring as a defensive midfielder, Chisala played in all the games in his first season at Wanderers, winning the 1988 Independence Cup when Wanderers beat Roan United 3–0, and the Champion of Champions trophy after a 3–2 victory over Kabwe Warriors. His performances were rewarded with the club's Footballer of the Year award for 1989 and when Melu left to pursue a professional career in Greece, Chisala dropped into defence where he cemented his position, and his commanding height saw him easily slot in though he was equally comfortable in midfield, scoring a number of goals and was soon after named captain of the team.

He would go on to win the Heroes and Unity in 1991 when Wanderers beat Nkana 2–1 in an exciting final in Kitwe and another Champion of Champions Cup in 1992 following another clash with Nkana which Wanderers won 2–0. Wanderers would however twice finish as runners-up to Nkana in the league in 1989 and 1992.

After Wanderers failed to win any silverware in 1993, Chisala left the following year to join Extension Gunners in Lobatse, where former Wanderers and Zambia coach Samuel ‘Zoom’ Ndhlovu was in charge. He also linked up with former Wanderers team-mate Francis Chisenga and the duo helped Gunners win the Botswana Premier League title in 1994. Chisala was named captain of the team in 1997 until he retired two years later and returned to Zambia where he had a stint as coach of Lusaka Youth Soccer Academy.

== National team ==
Chisala got a call-up to the national team in November 1989, as Zambia prepared for that year's CECAFA Cup and he made his debut in Zambia's second match of the tournament against Malawi which ended in a goalless draw. Zambia reached the semi-finals where they lost to Uganda. He was also in the team that traveled to India to take part in the Jawaharlal Nehru Centenary Cup, where they lost all their games to club sides from India, Mexico and the Soviet Union, featuring in two matches.

He was also in Zambia's team at the 1990 African Cup of Nations where he played one game against Senegal which ended in a barren stalemate that saw both teams qualify to the semi-finals, where Zambia lost to Nigeria 2–0. The match against Senegal turned out to be his last game for Zambia.

== Personal life ==
Chisala was married with five children though the marriage ended in divorce when he had a hard time finding meaningful employment after he retired from playing. He eventually settled in Lusaka and found his livelihood as a welder.
