= Frederick Kashimoto =

Zambian footballer and coach (born 1957)

Personal information
- Date of birth: 14 June 1957 (age 69)
- Place of birth: Mufulira, Northern Rhodesia
- Position: Midfielder

Youth career
- 1973–1977: Mutende Community Centre

Senior career*
| Years | Team | Apps | (Gls) |
| 1977–1993 | Mufulira Wanderers | | |

International career
| 1980–1988 | Zambia | | |

Managerial career
- 1999–2001: Muchindu Eagles
- 2001–2003: Mufulira Wanderers
- 2003: Prison Leopards
- 2006: City of Lusaka
- * Club domestic league appearances and goals

Frederick Kashimoto (born 14 June 1957) is a Zambian coach and former footballer. A gifted midfielder who won several trophies with Mufulira Wanderers, he also represented Zambia in the 70s and 80s. Upon retirement, he coached several Zambian clubs including Wanderers.

== Playing career ==
Kashimoto was born in Mufulira where he started his soccer career at Mutende Community Centre with whom he won the Dunlop Cup organised by the Copperbelt Amateur Football Association. His performances attracted the Zambian top league champions Mufulira Wanderers who lured him to Shinde Stadium in 1977.

Due to the stiff competition in Wanderers’ midfield, Kashimoto was loaned to the Butondo Western Tigers that same year where he impressed and was quickly recalled by Wanderers and he formed a midfield partnership with Zambian international Evans Katebe. Although short of stature, Kashimoto quickly became the fulcrum of Wanderers' midfield, winning a single league title in 1978 and several cup competitions. Picking on the translation of the second part of his name in some languages, he was nicknamed 'Kashi-Fire,'

Kashimoto refused to give up his full-time job when Wanderers became one of the four clubs under Zambia Consolidated Copper Mines (ZCCM) that turned professional in January 1990 which put him at odds with the team's management. He therefore quit Wanderers and joined lower division side Kafironda FC as he was able to train with the team after work.

Kashimoto was however enticed into coming back to play for Wanderers where he was appointed Assistant player-coach. He turned back the years to help Wanderers win the 1991 Heroes & Unity Cup and the Champion of Champions trophy in 1992. The following year, he quit playing after the Gabon air disaster.

== National team ==
Kashimoto made his debut for Zambia in a tournament to mark Zimbabwe's independence in April 1980. He was part of Zambia's Moscow Olympic Games squad and played in Zambia's final group game which they lost 2–1 to Venezuela.

He missed Zambia's 1981 CECAFA Cup attempt and was left out of Zambia's CAN 1982 squad but returned to the team under Bill McGarry when Zambia faced off with Sudan in a CAN qualifier in Khartoum in 1984 and lost 2–1. He impressed when Zambia thumped Uganda 3–0 in a World Cup qualifier in Ndola in July 1984.

He was then left out of the squad that went on to win the CECAFA Cup in 1984. After a three-year absence, Kashimoto was recalled and featured for Zambia in Olympic Games qualifying victories over Botswana and Uganda in 1987. He also featured at that year's CECAFA Cup where Zambia were knocked out in the first round.

His last game for Zambia came against Ghana on 31 January 1988 in Accra when Zambia qualified to the Seoul Olympic Games despite losing 1–0, sailing through on a 2–1 aggregate.

== Coaching career ==
After retirement, Kashimoto joined Mufulira Blackpool as assistant coach to former Wanderers teammate Michael Kapembwa and the duo helped the council-sponsored team win promotion back to the Zambia Super League after an absence of 20 years. This prompted Wanderers to call on his services as assistant coach to Ashols Melu. Together with George Lwandamina as the other assistant coach, the Wanderers technical bench brought back the Premier League trophy to Mufulira when they won back to back titles in 1995–96. The team also won the BP Top Eight Cup in 1994, 1996 and 1997, as well as the Mosi Cup in 1995.

He left Wanderers in 1999 and later handled Division I team and Muchindu Eagles of Mufulira. He returned to Wanderers in 2001 but sponsorship problems saw the giants of Zambian football being relegated in 2002 after which he coached Division I sides Prison Leopards of Kabwe and City of Lusaka. When he left City, he coached the U-17 national team and the national women's team.

Kashimoto then formed an academy for youngsters in Mufulira which he named after himself. With Wanderers struggling in Division I, his services were called upon again and he served in an advisory role to coach Emmanuel Nthala until October 2013 when both he and Nthala were fired with Wanderers facing relegation in 13th position on the log, with 24 points from 26 matches.

== Family life ==
Kashimoto has six children with his wife Loveness of which only the first born Frederick Jr. plays football.

== Road accident ==
On the night of 28 October 2009, Kashimoto was hit by an over-speeding taxi as he was crossing the road on his way home. He suffered a dislocated shoulder and underwent surgery at Kitwe Central Hospital and thereafter made a complete recovery.

== Honours ==
- Zambian League Championship: 1978
- Castle Cup/Independence Cup/Mosi Cup): 1988
- Zambian Challenge Cup (Shell Challenge Cup/BP Challenge Cup/ BP Top Eight Cup): 1984, 1986,
- Heinrich Cup/Chibuku Cup/Heroes and Unity Cup: 1985, 1987, 1988, 1991
- Champion of Champions Cup: 1978, 1985, 1988, 1992
