= Chisala =

Chisala is a Bantu surname. Notable people with the name include:

== Surname ==
- Obino Chisala (born 1999), Zambian footballer
- Philemon Chisala (born 1966), Zambian footballer
- Sarai Chisala-Tempelhoff (born 1980s), Malawian lawyer and activist
- Upile Chisala (born 1994), Malawian poet
- Wilson Chisala Kalumba (1964–2018), Zambian politician
