= Charly Musonda =

Charles Musonda or Charly Musonda may refer to:

- Charly Musonda (footballer, born 1969), Zambian footballer
- Charly Musonda (footballer, born 1996), Belgian footballer
