= Philemon Kaunda =

Zambian footballer

Personal information
- Place of birth: Zambia
- Position: Defender

Senior career*
| Years | Team | Apps | (Gls) |
| 1977–1986 | Mufulira Wanderers | | |
| 1987–1988 | Mbabane Dribbling Wizards | | |
| 1988–1991 | Moneni Pirates | | |

International career
| 1978–1986 | Zambia | | |
- * Club domestic league appearances and goals

Philemon Kaunda was a Zambian footballer who featured for Mufulira Wanderers in the early '80s and also played for Zambia as a central defender. His younger brother Philemon Mulala also played for both Wanderers and Zambia in the same period.

Kaunda first played for Wanderers when he was still a school boy at Kantanshi Secondary School in 1977 and made his international debut the following year when he came on as 90th-minute substitute in a CECAFA Cup group stage match against Somalia which Zambia won 4–0, with coach Brian Tiler stating that he had a great future with the national team. When Ackim Musenge was forced into retirement by injury at CECAFA 1979, Kaunda took over as Wanderers' key defender. In his time at Shinde Stadium, he won the league, the Challenge Cup and the Champion of Champions trophy.

He left Wanderers at the end of the 1986 season to join Swazi side Mbabane Dribbling Wizards and later Moneni Pirates, where he ended his playing career.

He later joined the technical bench of South African side Cape Town Spurs.
