= Willie Kunda =

Zambian footballer (1945-2007)

Personal information
- Full name: William Kunda
- Date of birth: 1945
- Place of birth: Mufulira, Northern Rhodesia
- Date of death: 15 December 2007 (aged 61–62)
- Place of death: Mansa, Zambia
- Position: Striker

Youth career
- 1960–1962: Lubuto Welfare Centre

Senior career*
Years	Team	Apps	(Gls)
1962–1966	Mufulira Wanderers		

International career
1964–1966	Zambia	6	(8)
- * Club domestic league appearances and goals

William Kunda (1945 – 15 December 2007) was a Zambian footballer who represented Zambia and Mufulira Wanderers as a striker in the mid-1960s. During a brief but prolific career, Kunda won several trophies with Wanderers until his career was prematurely ended by injury in 1966.

== Early life ==
Kunda was born in Mufulira where his father Thomas Chipayeni worked as a miner and had also played football for Mufulira Tigers, now known as Mufulira Blackpool. He was the first born in the family and his immediate younger brother Thomas Bwalya would also go on to feature for both Wanderers and the national team.

He began playing football in Section 5 of the Mine township and also played for his school Buyantanshi Primary. He later proceeded to Kantanshi Secondary School where he featured for the school team and came to the attention of Mufulira Wanderers’ scouting system leading to him joining Wanderers’ reserve side in 1962.

== Playing career ==
Kunda made his debut for Wanderers’ senior team as a right winger in the 1963 season at the age of 17, joining an already formidable front line made up of players like Samuel ‘Zoom’ Ndhlovu, Ron Jervis, Elijah Mwale, Laurent Chishala and Ken Simwanza as Wanderers unseated Zambian National Football League champions Roan United to take the title to Shinde Stadium at the end of the season.

Due to his clinical finishing, Kunda who was still in secondary school, was soon entrusted with the centre-forward position and did not disappoint as he became Wanderers leading scorer and though Wanderers lost the 1964 championship to City of Lusaka, they reclaimed it in 1965 and added the Heinrich Cup, the Castle Cup and the Inter-Rhodesia Castle Cup, and just missed out on the Challenge Cup in an unprecedented trophy haul. Wanderers’ fans loved their young striker and nicknamed him ‘Orlando,’ though Kunda later admitted that he had no idea about the origins of the name.

The following season, Kunda started off well and was once again Wanderers’ leading scorer but in June 1966, Wanderers hosted Kabwe United in a league match at Shinde stadium. His hat-trick had given Wanderers a 3–1 lead and as they pushed on for more goals, Kunda and Ken Simwanza collided in trying to head the same ball. Kunda came off worse and was stretchered off the pitch after suffering a broken nose. He bled profusely from the nose and this continued long after so doctors advised him to quit playing football.

== National team ==
Kunda was named in the first Northern Rhodesian national team in June 1964 soon after the country affiliated to FIFA. Despite being 18 years old, he was chosen to lead the front line and he scored the first goal in a 3–0 win over Tanganyika and two more when Northern Rhodesia swamped Nyasaland 5–0 to win the Ufulu Cup in Blantyre.

Despite this, he was left out of the Zambian team during the country's independence tournament in October 1964 which featured Kenya, Ghana and Uganda, and Zambia lost all their games. He returned to the team when Zambia traveled to Nairobi in December 1964 for the Kenyan Republic Cup two-match series. He watched from the bench as Zambia were beaten 4–2 in the opening match but starred in the second game, scoring four goals as Zambia turned the tables 8–2 to lift the trophy 10–6 on aggregate.

Kunda once again led the line when Zambia faced off with Kenya once more for the Rothmans’ International Trophy at home in September 1965, and he held his own alongside veterans Ndhlovu, Jackie Sewell and Emment Kapengwe and scored once in the three match series which Zambia won despite an 8-8 aggregate score on account of having forced more corners than Kenya in the final game. He also scored twice in two matches against Middlesex Wanderers in June 1965 and another two against Ugandan provincial side Busoga in October the same year which Zambia won 4-2 having earlier drawn against the Uganda Cranes two days earlier. This proved to be his last outing with the national team.

== Life after football ==
Unable to deal with a life outside football, Kunda quit his job as a Records Clerk with Mufulira Mine soon after hanging up his boots. Excitement was generated in Mufulira when he started training with Wanderers at the beginning of the 1967 in a comeback bid but the nose bleeds continued and he never played for Wanderers again. When his father retired from the mines three years later, he relocated to Mansa with his parents and kept himself busy by playing for, and coaching amateur side Mansa Wanderers though he vowed never to go back to the Copperbelt.

In September 1986, an article in the Times of Zambia brought to light Kunda's plight in a village called Chamalawa 3 km from Mansa on the Samfya highway. He was still living with his mother and stepfather and was often seen walking around the streets of Mansa barefoot. The man they used to call Orlando took the opportunity to appeal to his friends in Mufulira to send him clothes and shoes through the Times reporter. He disclosed that he had recovered from the nasal injury and only saw the doctor once in a while unlike in Mufulira where he was perpetually on tablets. He further claimed that Wanderers only gave him K56 (about GBP23) when he left Mufulira to go and live in the village after his parents were pensioned off and the only support he got was from his brother Thomas.

== Death ==
True to his word, Kunda lived the rest of his life in Mansa and died in December 2007 after illness.

=== Honours ===
==== Club Honours ====
- Zambian League Title: 1963, 1965
- Castle Cup: 1965
- Heinrich Cup: 1964, 1965
- Super Castle Cup: 1965.

==== National honours ====
- Malawi Ufulu Cup
- Kenya Republic Cup: 1964
- Rothmans International trophy: 1965
