= Ackim Musenge =

Zambian footballer and coach (born 1949)

Personal information
- Full name: Ackim Musenge
- Date of birth: 7 October 1949 (age 77)
- Place of birth: Mufulira, Northern Rhodesia
- Positions: Defender; midfielder

Youth career
- 1964–1965: Butondo Western Tigers

Senior career*
Years	Team	Apps	(Gls)
1966–1973	Butondo Western Tigers		
1973–1981	Mufulira Wanderers		

International career
1968–1979	Zambia		

Managerial career
- 1981–1982: Butondo Western Tigers
- 1985–1992: Mufulira Wanderers
- 1992–1997: Nico United
- 1998–1999: TAFIC
- 2000–2002: Continental Aces
- 2003: Boteti Young Fighters
- 2004: TAFIC
- 2005–2006: Young Green Eagles
- 2007–2010: Green Eagles
- * Club domestic league appearances and goals

Ackim Musenge (born 7 October 1949) is a Zambian former footballer and coach. Renowned for his exceptional defensive ability and versatility, Musenge is rated as one of the finest defenders to have played for the Zambia national team, which he captained at the 1978 African Cup of Nations in Ghana. He later coached Mufulira Wanderers and several other club sides.

== Early life ==
Musenge was born on 7 October 1949 in Mufulira. His father Diamond Musenge was a carpenter while his mother Eness was a house-wife. He was the first born in a family of seven of which four were boys. His brother Japhen also played for Wanderers. He attended Mufulira Mine School and later Kantanshi Secondary School.

== Playing career ==
=== Butondo Western Tigers ===
At the age of 15 Musenge joined Zambian Division II side Butondo Western Tigers, one of the teams sponsored by Mufulira Division of Roan Copper Mines. He later formed part of the first Zambia School's national team which was coached by John Green and managed by King George High School teacher Glyn Peters. During his time with Zambia Schools, Musenge played in high-profile friendly matches against English youth teams such as West Ham United, Ipswich Town and Derby County youth teams.

At Tigers, Musenge who started off as an attacking midfielder and occasionally played on the right wing, was a regular goal scorer. In 1966, he helped the team gain promotion to Division I and went on to become captain. In 1969, he scored 18 goals in all competitions. In the early '70s, Samuel "Zoom" Ndhlovu, who was Wanderers' coach but would also double as Tigers coach from time to time since they shared the same sponsor, noticed some defensive qualities in Musenge's play and converted him into a defender to shore up a leaky defence.

In April 1975, Musenge was transferred to Wanderers along with Brines Mulenga and Gerald Mungule. This was a controversial move in that Tigers alleged that they were being victimised by mine management who ordered them to surrender the three players to Wanderers who in turn gave Tigers three reserve players. Tigers officials protested to the Football Association of Zambia (FAZ) to no avail, and labelled mine management "pro-Wanderers. Many have pointed to this forced transfer of Tigers' best players as what led to the decline in the team's fortunes.

=== Mufulira Wanderers ===
He made his debut on 20 April 1975 in a league match at Shinde Stadium against Ndola United which Wanderers won 2–0. Although he played multiple positions across the defense area, he primarily played at center-back.

His first piece silverware was the 1975 Independence Cup when Wanderers beat Green Buffaloes 2–1. In December of that same year, confusion reigned when Buffaloes registered 'Ackim Musenge' for the following years' East and Central African Club championship and Wanderers were up in arms, accusing Buffaloes of poaching their player. It turned out that the player registered by Buffaloes was an 18-year-old cousin of the Wanderers star, who coincidentally shared the same name with him.

Musenge won two league titles in 1976 and 1978 and was runner-up in 1975 and 1977 both times to Green Buffaloes. He also won the Heroes & Unity Cup in 1976, 2 Charity Shields in 1976 and 1977 and was a three-time winner of the Champion of Champions trophy in 1976, 1977 and 1978. One of the most disciplined players around, Musenge was appointed Wanderers captain in 1977, the same year in which he was named captain of the national team. In 1979, Musenge suffered a broken leg at that year's CECAFA tournament in a 2–2 draw with Tanzania, which would keep him out of action for more than a season. He attempted a comeback in 1981 but a nagging knee injury forced him to quit for good after being operated on.

== National team ==
Musenge was first called to the national team by John Green as a 19-year-old in 1968 and made his debut when Zambia played a friendly match against Tanzania on 24 October 1968, in preparation for a World Cup qualifier against Sudan. Due to the superb pairing of Dickson Makwaza and Dick Chama at the heart of Zambia's defence, Musenge would spend some time as a squad player without seeing much action. In a CAN 1972 qualifier in Kinshasa in June 1971 which Zambia lost 3–0, Musenge replaced midfielder Richard Stephenson as a second-half substitute and when he did cement a regular spot in the team, it was as a left-back.

He was in the team that beat Morocco 4–0 in October 1973 in a World Cup qualifier and was also in the Zambian team that defeated Nigeria 7–4 in aggregate after a 5–1 first leg victory in Lusaka, to qualify to CAN 1974. He featured at the tournament in March 1974 where Zambia reached the final only to lose to Zaire after a replay.

After the retirement of first Makwaza and then Chama in the mid-'70s, Musenge assumed the central defence position and was named captain in January 1977. He led Zambia to the CAN 1978 where they were ejected in the first round.

Musenge fractured his leg in November 1979 at that year's CECAFA tournament and this ended his national team career. After a long lay-off, he attempted a comeback in October 1981 but a knee injury, which required an operation brought down the curtain on his playing career.

== Coaching career ==
Musenge began coaching at a young age. He was player-coach during his time at Butondo as they did not have a coach so the players trained themselves and used the expertise of Ndhlovu from time to time.

After his career-ending injury, Musenge returned to Butondo as a coach and was then appointed Wanderers assistant coach to Ndhlovu in 1983. He also coached the Zambia U-16 team in 1984 which featured a young Charles Musonda. The team fell by the wayside one match short of the World Youth Cup finals in China.

Musenge attended a coaching course in East Germany in 1985 and when Ndhlovu was promoted to oversee all mine-sponsored football teams, Musenge became Wanderers head coach, winning the Heroes & Unity Cup and the Champion of Champions Cup in his first season. In 1991, Musenge was appointed assistant national team coach to Ndhlovu, along with Freddie Mwila, Emmanuel Musakabantu and George Mungwa for the regional CECAFA tournament in Sudan which Zambia won after beating Kenya 2–0 in the final, despite not fielding any of their big name players.

He was also part of the technical bench at CAN 1992 where Zambia lost in the quarter-finals to eventual winners Ivory Coast. The coaching team was dropped and a disillusioned Musenge packed his bags and headed for Botswana where he coached Nico United in Selebi Phikwe. He found other Zambian coaches there like Dick Chama at BDF and Freddie Mwila at Township Rollers. The Zambian coaches made such an impact there that the trio were included in the BFA technical committee.

Musenge won the Independence Cup in his first season at Nico United and stayed with the team for 6 seasons with their best showing in the league being a second-place finish. He then moved to TAFIC of Francistown in 1998 and won the President's Cup in his first season. Two years later he moved to Army side Continental Aces and after two years, moved to Boteti Young Fighters of Orapa in 2003. The following year, he returned to TAFIC and after 13 years in Botswana decided to return to Zambia.

He joined Zambia National Service-sponsored Young Green Eagles in Kafue and helped the team win promotion to Division I. In appreciation of this, the ZNS command transferred him to Green Eagles in Kabwe where he worked with coach Jim Mwale in guiding the team to the Super Division. After four years, Musenge parted company with Eagles in 2011 and retired to his farm in Nyimba.

== Personal life ==
Musenge is married to Christine and they have three children; Hector, Wendy and Diana.
