= Dick Chama =

Zambian footballer and coach (1946-2006)

Personal information
- Date of birth: 11 February 1946
- Place of birth: Bancroft, Northern Rhodesia
- Date of death: 21 March 2006 (aged 60)
- Place of death: Lusaka, Zambia
- Position: Centre-back

Senior career*
| Years | Team | Apps | (Gls) |
| 1962–1969 | Bancroft North-End | | |
| 1969–1970 | Mufulira Wanderers | | |
| 1971 | Bancroft Blades | | |
| 1972–1976 | Zambia Army F.C | | |

International career
| 1967–1976 | Zambia | 78 | (6) |

Managerial career
- 1978–1986: Green Buffaloes
- 1980: Zambia
- 1987: BDF F.C.
- 1988–1990: Green Buffaloes
- 1992–1995: Zanaco F.C.
- 1994–1995: Zambia
- 1996–1997: TASC F.C.
- 2002: Nkwazi F.C.
- 2003–2005: Highlanders
- * Club domestic league appearances and goals

Dick Chama (11 February 1946 – 21 March 2006) was a Zambian footballer and coach who played as a centre-back. He was Zambia's defensive stalwart from the late '60s to the mid '70s and formed a formidable central defence pairing alongside Dickson Makwaza and was part of Zambia's squad during the country's very first CAN outing in 1974 and made the official CAF team of the tournament. Chama was voted Zambian Sportsman of the Year in 1975 and after retirement, he coached several club sides as well as the national team.

== Playing career ==
Chama was born in Bancroft (now Chililabombwe) and was one of the founding members of the mine team Bancroft North End (which later became Bancroft Blades), captaining the side at the age of 20. In June 1967, he was selected to play for Zambia against the touring John Charles XI and he played every game in the three match series. His performances were so impressive that Welsh club Cardiff City was reportedly interested in signing him together with Godfrey Chitalu. His full international debut came the following month in a friendly against Tanzania in Dar es Salaam which ended in a 2–2 draw. He also featured in the Jamhuri Cup in December 1967 in Nairobi against Kenya with Zambia winning both games in the two match series to lift the trophy.

From then on, Chama had an increased presence in the team, forming a solid partnership with Makwaza. Chama was known for helping out in attack and scoring occasional goals.

In April 1968, Chama was named captain against a team of visiting UK coaches as well against Leicester City team which featured Peter Shilton in goal. Later that year, he led Zambia to victory in the Heroes Cup against Uganda which Zambia won 5–3 on aggregate.

Freddie Mwila took over as captain for the World Cup qualifying match against Sudan in October 1968 which Zambia won 4–2 in Ndola but were eliminated after losing the return leg by the same margin. The score was 3–1 after 90 minutes and after extra-time, Sudan came out on top and went through due to a strange rule which was in force at the time, that favoured the team that won the second leg in the event of a tie. When the Football Association of Zambia (FAZ) protested to FIFA, the world governing body's response, which indicated that the particular rule was specific to Africa, was that Sudan had indeed gone through because 'Soccer matches in Africa are governed by a special rule which states that when teams are level after the two legs, the team which scored more goals in the second leg qualifies to the next round.'

When Zambia drew with Mauritius 2–2 in the second round first leg of Africa Cup qualification in Lusaka, the national team selectors replaced Mwila with Chama as captain and ordered coach John Green to abandon the 4–3–3 system he had used in that game and took team selection out of the coach's hands.

Zambia won the second leg in Port Louis 3–2 after extra-time and the right to meet Cameroun in the final qualifying round. Yet again Zambia could only settle for a 2–2 home draw and they lost the return leg 2–1 in Yaounde. Samuel "Zoom" Ndhlovu was charged for his conduct during the trip and though Chama as captain backed him up, Ndhlovu was left out of the national team and Chama was stripped of the captainship and replaced with Makwaza in August 1969.

In September 1969 Chama left Bancroft to join Mufulira Wanderers for the then record fee in Zambian football which started at K1,600 but was negotiated down to K1,000. As the haggling over the price went on, Chama announced that he would give up soccer if the deal fell through but the two clubs eventually reached common ground.

He left Wanderers at the end of the 1970 season to return to Blades and in November of the same year, Chama scored a goal when Zambia beat Tanzania 5–1 in CAN qualifier in Lusaka to qualify to the next round on a 6–2 aggregate score line but were knocked out by Congo DR in June the following year 4–2 on aggregate after winning the first leg 2–1 in Ndola.

In December 1971, Chama arrived in Lusaka from Nairobi where Zambia had lost the Jamhuri Cup to Kenya to discover that he had been axed from the Footballer of the Year shortlist along with Makwaza, Chitalu, Emment Kapengwe, Philip Tembo and Abraham Nkole for a variety of disciplinary reasons. In Chama's case, he was barred for being sent off in a game against Malawi and failing to pay the subsequent fine until threatened with suspension, and for being cautioned in an international match against Kenya. Chama responded that he did not give a hoot about the award: “The award has never been my target. It is out of the question as far as I am concerned. I have already reached my target and that was to represent Zambia.”{} Richard Stephenson ended up being crowned Footballer of the Year. At the end of the season Blades were relegated from the top league and Chama first expressed interest in signing for Nchanga Rangers but ended up crossing over to Zambia Army Football Club with Blades stating that the transfer was free as he was joining the army as a soldier.

In July 1973, Zambia crushed Nigeria 5–1 in Lusaka and lost 3–2 in the second leg to qualify to the CAN for the first time. Chama was named vice-captain and he played every minute of every game as Zambia reached the final and drew with Zaire 2–2 but lost the replay 2–0. He was the only Zambian player named in the official CAF team of the tournament which contained five Zairean players and four Egyptians.

He won the league with Buffaloes in 1973, 1974 and 1975 and when Makwaza retired from international football in 1975, Chama succeeded him and led Zambia to a 2–1 victory against Uganda in July 1975 in CAN qualifier in Lusaka. He won the Challenge Cup and the Champion of Champions trophy with Buffaloes later that year and was named 1975 Sportsman of the Year.

In June 1976, he announced his intention to retire from football at the age of 30, stating that he felt the need to step aside and give younger players a chance. He made close to 80 appearances and scored 6 goals.

== Coaching career ==
Later that year, Chama left for West Germany on a coaching stint for one year three months and when he returned, was named Buffaloes coach in early 1978 and won the Heroes & Unity Cup in his first season. In an interview in September of that year, Chama identified losing composure while under pressure and playing to the crowd as some of the weaknesses of Zambian football and that he would not agree to coach the national team in view of the many Zambian coaches who had been let down by the FAZ administration, but would consider doing so on a very temporary basis.

He served as assistant national team coach to Brian Tiler and when Tiler left at the end of his two-year contract in December 1979, Chama succeeded him as Zambian coach. His first game in charge was against Egypt in an Olympic Games qualifier in Cairo two months later for a ticket to the 1980 Olympic Games which Zambia lost 4–1. They fought out a goalless draw in the second leg but Egypt pulled out of the games for political reasons and Zambia took their place at the Moscow Olympics. After beating Ethiopia 4–0 on aggregate to qualify to the next round of the World Cup qualifying campaign, Zambia featured at the Olympic Games and lost all of their games to Cuba, the USSR and Venezuela.

In November 1980 Zambia were then eliminated from the World Cup race by Morocco 5–4 on post match penalties in Lusaka after erasing a 2–0 first leg deficit. Romanian Ted Dumitru then came in as Technical Advisor and took over as national coach in December. Chama won the league and Challenge Cup double on two occasions in 1979 and 1981. In 1982, Buffaloes were overwhelmed 5–0 by Red Arrows in the Challenge Cup final and Chama described it as 'the most painful and most disappointing defeat in the club's history. Buffaloes however regained the Challenge cup in 1985 when they beat Nchanga Rangers 6–5 on post-match penalties.

Chama was still coach at Buffaloes when they faced defending champions Mufulira Wanderers in the final of the Heroes & Unity Cup in September 1986, the last cup final to be played at Dag Hammerskjoeld Stadium, which had to go to a replay when a ten-man Buffaloes held Wanderers 1–1, with Alfred Chella who was playing against his old club cancelling out Ashols Melu's 73rd-minute opener with 12 minutes remaining. Chama thanked referee Costain Mweemba for sending off Patrick Mwamba in the 55th minute for rough play, as it 'propped up Buffaloes' fighting spirit.' In the replay a week later, Buffaloes carried the day with a 2–0 win at the same venue.

In 1987, Chama who rose to the position of Major in the army, left for a one-year attachment with BDF football club in Botswana, taking them to second position in the league and a Lions Cup triumph. Upon his return in December of that year, he charged that soccer standards in Zambia had retrogressed because of intrusion into its administration at club and national level by "too many ignorant people." He also expressed disappointment that former footballers had been left out in the running of clubs.

He was once again on the national team technical bench under Zambia Samuel Ndhlovu in 1989 and travelled to CAN '90 in Algeria where Zambia reached the semis. He served as Technical Advisor at Buffaloes and later joined Zanaco F.C. where he stayed for two seasons. When Ian Porterfield resigned as Zambian coach in June 1994, Chama was appointed care-taker coach and his first assignment was to lead Zambia to a tournament in Egypt which they won after losing to Ghana 1–0 and defeating the hosts 4–0. He led Zambia in two more friendly wins in Lusaka – a 2–1 victory against Malawi and a 3–0 win over Ghana after which Roald Poulsen took over at the helm.

He crossed over and coached TASC FC in Botswana but was relieved of his duties when the team was relegated in 1997 so he went back to Zambia to serve as Buffaloes Technical Advisor and was appointed Nkhwazi FC coach in March 2002 but was sidelined midway through the following season after some poor results. He then crossed the border into Zimbabwe where he was first appointed Highlanders Technical Advisor but later took over as coach, leading the Bulawayo outfit to two top four finishes including runners-up in 2004 and left after two years when his contract expired in August 2005.

== Death ==
Chama returned to Zambia and according to his son Dick Junior, was about to take up an appointment as Namibian national team coach when he fell ill and died of kidney failure after a bout of malaria on 21 March 2006 at Maina Soko Military Hospital in Lusaka. He was survived by a wife and three children.
