= Kapambwe Mulenga =

Zambian footballer (1963–1996)

Kapambwe Mulenga (1963–1996) was a Zambian footballer who played as a defender.

He played for Zambia's most successful football team, Nkana Red Devils FC, and its successor Nkana FC, as well as with the national football team with whom he participated in the 1986, 1990 and 1994 (where Zambia lost in the finals against Nigeria) African Cup of Nations.

He was always a crowd favourite owing to both his hard play and comic antics on and off the field of play. Kapambwe made a name as one of the few footballers in the country to have played effectively as defender and midfielder for both club and country. Kapambwe, fondly known as 'gentile,' played in the 1980s and 1990s when Zambian football was at its peak with local clubs like Nkana Red Devils, Power Dynamos, Mufulira Wanderers, Green Buffaloes and Kabwe Warriors competing fiercely at continental levels.

He briefly crossed over to Nkana's fierce rivals Power Dynamos before returning to Nkana and was later appointed assistant player-coach shortly before his death in 1996.

Kapambwe was an African Cup of Champions Clubs Silver medalist in 1990 when Nkana lost in the final against JS Kabylie of Algeria in Lusaka and won a record 7 leagues titles with Nkana. He died in early 1996 after a short illness in Kitwe, Zambia.
