= Joel Bwalya =

Zambian footballer and coach (born 1972)

Personal information
- Full name: Joel Kangala Bwalya
- Date of birth: 24 October 1972 (age 54)
- Position: Midfielder

Team information
- Current team: Kafue Celtic (manager)

Youth career
- 1985–1986: Mufulira Police
- 1986–1987: Mufulira Wanderers

Senior career*
Years	Team	Apps	(Gls)
1987–1991	Mufulira Wanderers		
1991–1998	Cercle Brugge	28	(0)
1994–1996	→ KRC Harelbeke (loan)		
1999–2000	Zultse VV		
2004	ZESCO United		

International career
- Zambia U16
- Zambia U20
1990–1997	Zambia	20	(1)

Managerial career
- Luanshya Hotspurs
- Luanshya United
- 2017: Red Arrows (assistant)
- 2017–2020: Ndola United
- 2020: Zanaco (assistant)
- 2021-: Kafue Celtic
- * Club domestic league appearances and goals

Joel Kangala Bwalya (born 24 October 1972) is a Zambian football coach and former player who has been the manager of Kafue Celtic since August 2021.

== Early and personal life ==
Bwalya grew up in Mufulira with two older brothers who were both also footballers, Benjamin and Kalusha.

He left school in the 10th grade to focus on a football career.

== Club career ==
Bwalya played as a midfielder. He began his career with Mufulira Police in 1985, moving to Mufulira Wanderers in 1986, and becoming a first-team member in 1987. In 1988 he won the Independence Cup with Mufulira Wanderers.

He later played in Belgium for Cercle Brugge, KRC Harelbeke and Zultse VV. When he moved to Belgium in 1991 with Cercle Brugge, rejecting the chance to sign for Swiss club Grasshoppers, he did so because his older brother Kalusha had previously played for the club. In 1994 he was loaned to KRC Harelbeke for two years. Whilst with Harelbeke, Bwalya was voted the best foreign player in Division One. Harelbeke wanted to make the loan permanent, but Bwalya returned to Cercle Brugge.

He finished his career back in Zambia with ZESCO United.

== International career ==
In 1988 Bwalya was a member of the Zambia under-16 team playing qualifying matches for the 1989 FIFA U-16 World Championship. He was also a squad member for the under-20 team at the 1991 African Youth Championship.

He also played for the senior team between 1990 and 1997, making his international debut at the age of 18. He was a squad member at the African Cup of Nations in 1990, 1994, and 1996.

== Coaching career ==
Bwalya coached at Luanshya Hotspurs and Luanshya United. In 2017 he was an assistant coach at Red Arrows, before becoming manager of Ndola United. He left Ndola United in January 2020 to become an assistant coach at Zanaco.

In August 2021, Bwalya was named manager of newly promoted top-tier side Kafue Celtic.
