= Harrison Chongo =

Zambian footballer (1969–2011)

Personal information
- Date of birth: 5 June 1969
- Place of birth: Mufulira, Zambia
- Date of death: 12 May 2011 (aged 41)
- Place of death: Mufulira, Zambia
- Positions: Defender; defensive midfielder

Senior career*
Years	Team	Apps	(Gls)
1988–1992	Mufulira Wanderers		
1992–2002	Al Taawon		

International career
1992–1998	Zambia		
- * Club domestic league appearances and goals

Harrison "Wawa" Chongo (5 June 1969 – 12 May 2011) was a Zambian professional footballer who played as a centre-back or defensive midfielder for the Zambia national team.

== Career ==
Born in Lusaka, Chongo began playing club football Mufulira Wanderers, breaking into the first team in 1989. In 1992, he joined Al Taawon Club in the Saudi First Division, where he played until he retired.

Chongo was included in the Zambia national team that reached the final for the 1994 African Nations Cup. He also played in 11 FIFA World Cup qualifying matches. and Wawa is regarded as the first Zambian footballer ever to have played professional football for Arabs for a decade in Saudi Arabia and once attended trials for two Premier League sides, Crystal Palace and Barnsley, after assisting his Saudi-based club Al-Tawoon for winning promotion to Saudi professional league this time as champions for the first time ever in 1996–97 season, he impressed during the trials in England in 1997 despite being overpriced as their defense kingpin and the deal fell through. Nevertheless, he achieved so much and made a second coming for his childhood team Mufulira Wanderers to wrap up his playing career in 2002 as coach player and became appointed as interim coach in 2010 and helped the team survive relegation from sinking into division 2. At the start of the 2011 season he was given a go-ahead as a head coach for the first time and managed to run the eight-game unbeaten race despite death cutting short his dream for bouncing "mighty" to the super league.

== Personal ==
He died in May 2011 of malaria. At the time of his death he was head coach of Mufulira Wanderers.
