= Allan Kamwanga =

Zambian footballer (born 1968)

Personal information
- Date of birth: 30 October 1968 (age 57)
- Position: Defender

Senior career*
Years	Team	Apps	(Gls)
- Mufulira Wanderers

International career
1994–1999	Zambia	35	(2)
- * Club domestic league appearances and goals

Allan Kamwanga (born 30 October 1968) is a Zambian former footballer who played as a defender. He played in 35 matches for the Zambia national team from 1994 to 1999. He was also named in Zambia's squad for the 1998 African Cup of Nations tournament.
