= Philemon Mulala =

Zambian footballer (died 2023)

Personal information
- Date of birth: c. 1963
- Place of birth: Tanganyika
- Date of death: 7 January 2023 (aged 59–60)
- Place of death: Lichtenburg, North West, South Africa
- Positions: Defender; forward

Senior career*
Years	Team	Apps	(Gls)
1983–1986	Mufulira Wanderers		
1987–1988	Cape Town Spurs		
1989–1990	Rangers		

International career
1984–1985	Zambia	6	(3)
- * Club domestic league appearances and goals

Philemon Mulala (c. 1963 – 7 January 2023) was a Zambian footballer who was best known for scoring two goals in the 1984 CECAFA Cup semi-final against Kenya, on their way to their first ever cup triumph. Nicknamed Shombo (hard worker), he featured for Mufulira Wanderers in the same team as his elder brother, central defender Philemon Kaunda but is not related to Evans Mulala who also played in central defence in the same team.

== Career ==
Mulala first played for Mufulira Wanderers in 1983 as a left-back who loved to go forward, often to the neglect of his defensive duties until coach Samuel ‘Zoom’ Ndhlovu gave him a starting berth as a right winger and he seized the opportunity with both hands, scoring twice and creating a goal in a 5–2 league win over Konkola Blades.

During his time at Wanderers, he won the BP Challenge Cup, the Heroes and Unity Cup and the Champion of Champions trophy after which he left to join Cape Town Stars in South Africa and later played for Dynamos.

His forceful play saw him being selected to the national team in 1984 where he made his international debut in the third group match against Uganda that ended in a 1–1 draw. In the following match which was the semifinal against Kenya, he scored a brace in extra-time as Zambia went on to win the trophy for the first time in their history with a 3–0 win over Malawi on post-match penalties.

Mulala died on 7 January 2023, after reportedly being attacked by his own dogs.
