= Blackpool F.C. (South Africa) =

- Full name: Blackpool Football Club
- Founded: 2010
- Ground: Gauteng
- League: SAFA Second Division
Home colours	Away colours

Blackpool F.C. are a South African football franchise based in Gauteng. The club is owned by businessman Takalani Rabali, who previously worked for Limpopo United F.C. Rabali purchased a franchise licence for the Gauteng stream of the Vodacom League and the club was created in 2010. Rabali felt it would be easier to promoted from the Gauteng stream of the Vodacom League than the stronger Limpopo stream.

The club's owner has promised to relocate the team to Nzhelele, Limpopo should they win promotion to the National First Division.

They finished second in the Gauteng division of the 2010–11 season, finishing six points behind Highlands Park F.C.
