= Simon Bwalya =

Zambian international footballer (born 1985)

Personal information
- Date of birth: 25 February 1985 (age 41)
- Place of birth: Lusaka, Zambia
- Position: Midfielder

Team information
- Current team: Kansanshi Dynamos

Senior career*
Years	Team	Apps	(Gls)
2003–2006	Lusaka Dynamos		
2007–2013	Power Dynamos		
2014–2019	Nkana		
2019–	Kansanshi Dynamos		

International career^{‡}
2009–2010	Zambia	5	(0)
- * Club domestic league appearances and goals as of 19:18, 3 February 2015 (UTC) ‡ National team caps and goals as of 19:18, 3 February 2015 (UTC)

Simon Bwalya (born 25 February 1985) is a Zambian international footballer who plays for Kansanshi Dynamos, as a midfielder.

== Career ==
Born in Lusaka, Bwalya has played for Lusaka Dynamos, Power Dynamos and Nkana.

He earned 5 caps for Zambia between 2009 and 2010.

In December 2019, Bwalya joined Kansanshi Dynamos.
