= Tolomeo Mwansa =

Zambian footballer (1941–2014)

Personal information
- Date of birth: 1941
- Place of birth: Kitwe, Northern Rhodesia
- Date of death: 4 July 2014 (aged 73)
- Place of death: Samfya, Zambia
- Position: Goalkeeper

Senior career*
Years	Team	Apps	(Gls)
1960–1972	Mufulira Wanderers		

International career
1964–1969	Zambia		
- * Club domestic league appearances and goals

Tolomeo Mwansa (1941 - 4 July 2014) was Zambia’s goalkeeper at independence in October 1964. Nicknamed ‘Juva,’ he won several trophies in his career with ‘Mighty’ Mufulira Wanderers including the 1965 Super Castle Cup against City Wanderers in Salisbury.

== Playing career ==
Mwansa was born in 1941 in Kitwe and played football on the streets as a boy before taking it up seriously at Luanshimba School in 1956. When his father retired from the mine in Kitwe, the family moved to Mufulira in 1959 and the following year, Mwansa joined Mufulira Mine Team whose name changed to Mufulira Wanderers in 1962 when the Zambian National Football League (NFL) was formed.

He kept goal for the dominant Wanderers side of the ‘60s and played alongside players like Samuel ‘Zoom’ Ndhlovu, Penius ‘Kapenta’ Chirwa, Joseph ‘Kanono’ Musonda, Dickson ‘Barb-Wire’ Makwaza, George ‘Wikolo’ Sikazwe, Patrick ‘Whiskey’ Nkole, Ken Simwanza, Bedford ‘Mayo,’ Kaputo, Willie ‘Orlando’ Kunda and Elijah ‘Kapilipili’ Mwale.

Tall and powerfully built, Mwansa was an imposing figure to many opponents and was also known for showboating. He was in the Wanderers team that won its first league championship in 1963 and would go on to win 4 more league titles including three in a row in 1965–1967. Often turning up with a clean-shaven head on match day, the giant goalkeeper was also in goal when Wanderers won the Super Castle Cup by beating City Wanderers of Southern Rhodesia 4–3 in October 1965.

Mwansa was first selected for the national team in July 1964 when Zambia affiliated to both FIFA and CAF and travelled to Malawi for the Mufulu Cup which featured Tanzania and Malawi and was in goal as Zambia beat Tanzania 3-0 and the hosts 5–0.

Mwansa also featured in the Saba Saba tournament in Tanzania in July 1967 though he did not see much action after this as Happy Malama was the preferred goalkeeper by national team coaches, relegating Mwansa to a reserve role. He made a return when Zambia met Cameroon for a place at CAN 1970 with Zambia drawing 2–2 at home in June 1969 and going out after a 2–1 defeat in Yaoundé on 3 August 1969 in a match where Zambia scored first through Godfrey Chitalu and conceded an equalizer by Confiance Moukoko in the 56th minute. Cameroun's winning goal was conceded when Mwansa, in retrieving a ball which was going out for a goal kick collided with a Cameroonian attacker and a penalty was awarded in the 75th minute which sent Zambia packing.

In the same year during a Shell Challenge Cup quarter-final match between Wanderers and City of Lusaka at Woodlands Stadium, Mwansa was involved in a challenge with Ridgeway Liwena, that left the City striker with a compound fracture of the leg, that abruptly cut short his career.

In 1970 Abraham Nkole rose to prominence as Wanderers goalkeeper although Mwansa still featured in some matches as Nkole would sometimes play as a striker. He almost joined Wanderers’ rivals Mufulira Blackpool in 1971 but changed his mind and stayed at Shinde Stadium. He featured in that year's Castle Cup final against Roan United after a twice replayed semi-final against Kabwe Warriors which ended in 2-2 and 3-3 draws before Wanderers prevailed 3–2. Wanderers lifted the trophy after winning by the odd goal in a nine-goal thriller.

Mwansa retired from soccer in 1972 to concentrate on his job with the mines. In 1977, he served as interim vice-chairman for Wanderers when player power forced out the executive and a care-taker committee was installed.

== Personal life ==
Mwansa had 10 children with Eliza whom he married in 1960. He retired from the mines where he had risen to Sectional Shift boss, in 1995 and relocated to his home village in Samfya to concentrate on farming.

== Death ==
Mwansa died on 4 July 2014 in Samfya after illness.
