= Benjamin Bwalya =

Zambian footballer and coach (1961-1999)

Personal information
- Full name: Benjamin Bwalya Jnr
- Date of birth: 30 August 1961
- Place of birth: Mufulira, Northern Rhodesia
- Date of death: 9 February 1999 (aged 37)
- Place of death: Mufulira, Zambia
- Position: Forward

Senior career*
Years	Team	Apps	(Gls)
1978–1980	Mufulira Blackpool FC		
1981–1983	Mufulira Wanderers		
1984–1991	Nchanga Rangers		

International career
1985	Zambia	1	(0)

Managerial career
- 1992–1999: Konkola Blades
- * Club domestic league appearances and goals

Benjamin Bwalya Jnr (30 August 1961 – 9 February 1999) was a Zambian footballer and coach. Bwalya was the son of soccer administrator Benjamin Bwalya Snr and the elder brother of celebrated former Zambian player Kalusha Bwalya. The youngest brother Joel Bwalya was also a footballer.

He played his club football for Mufulira Blackpool, Mufulira Wanderers and Nchanga Rangers, and after retirement he became Konkola Blades’ coach.

== Early life ==
Bwalya was born in Mufulira to Benjamin Bwalya Sr and Elidah Bwalya and when the family moved to Ndola he went to Kansenshi Primary School from 1968 to 1974. He did his secondary school education at Mufulira Secondary from 1975 and upon completion, went for the compulsory national service training camp in 1981. In 1978, his father travelled to Madagascar with Wanderers and bought Bwalya his first pair of Adidas boots, a pair which he treasured and swore to keep and hang in his house for his children to see.

== Playing career ==
Bwalya joined Mufulira Blackpool in 1978 where it was quite a challenge playing alongside names like John Lengwe, Simon Kaushi and the player he admired the most, Alex Chola. His young brother Kalusha would follow to watch him play and he eventually joined Blackpool as well. Bwalya could play all forward positions but featured mainly as a right winger, in contrast to his left-footed younger brother who was solely a left winger. In 1981 they moved to the mine-sponsored giants Wanderers at the behest of their father, who felt they were better off playing for the club that was sponsored by the company he worked for.

That same year, he travelled to Lubumbashi with Wanderers and they took part in two friendlies against St. Louis Lupopo and TP Mazembe. It was during this tour that he earned the nickname ‘Boga’ after which he admitted that he did not bother to find out what it meant but the name spread in Mufulira.

The hugely talented Bwalya left Wanderers in 1984 for Chingola-based Premier League rivals Nchanga Rangers who he would play for until 1991 after which he retired from playing and coached briefly as one of the assistants at Rangers before joining Konkola Blades in 1992 as coach.

== National team ==
Bwalya made a single appearance for Zambia in a friendly against Malawi in 1985 in Ndola which ended in a 1–1 draw.

Although he was often called to the national team, he never featured for Zambia again. In January 1987, he was dropped from the national team, prompting him to question the national team selectors. “You must have full-backs to stay in the national team ... some of the players in the so-called national team are not talented at all.”

== Coaching career ==
Upon retirement, Bwalya took up coaching and briefly worked as one of the assistants at Nchanga Stadium before moving to neighbouring Konkola Blades as head coach. Under him, Blades developed into a strong team and won the 1998 Mosi Cup after beating Zanaco FC 2–1 in Lusaka. He also served as coach for the U-17 and U-20 national teams and worked as one of the assistant coaches to Roald Poulsen at the senior national team. He was also appointed assistant coach to Ben Bamfuchile in 1998.

== Death ==
In January 1999, Bwalya travelled with the national team to Madagascar for a CAN qualifier. On the day of the match, he fell ill and missed the game which Zambia won 2–1. When the team returned, he was admitted to Malcolm Watson Hospital with suspected cerebral malaria on January 27. Bwalya died in hospital on the night of 9 February 1999. The passing of the young coach who was just coming into his own was described as a terrible loss to the football fraternity.
