= Mufulira Wanderers F.C. =

Association football club in Zambia

Mufulira Wanderers
- Full name: Mufulira Wanderers Football Club
- Nicknames: Mighty; Abena Milambo (The people from Milambo)
- Founded: 1953; 73 years ago
- Ground: Shinde Stadium; Mufulira
- Capacity: 18,000
- Manager: Tenant chilumba
- League: Zambian Premier League
- 2025–26: 8th
Home colours	Away colours

Mufulira Wanderers is a Zambian football club, based in the Copperbelt town of Mufulira, and compete in the Zambia Super League after their promotion from the Zambia National Division One at the end of 2023–24.

Popularly known as Mighty Mufulira Wanderers AKA Abena Milambo, the club has won 49 trophies and has also produced some of the country's greatest players. However, the club has experienced a decline in performance in recent years, spending nine years in Division I between 2006 and 2015, and having not won any honours since 1997.

== History ==
=== 1953–1959: Early years ===
Mufulira Wanderers Football Club was formed in 1953 as Mufulira Mine Team when mine workers demanded their own team to rival the town's municipal-run team Mufulira Football Club which later became Mufulira Blackpool. So the Mufulira Mine Team came into existence from the merger of teams that took part in tribal matches and like Blackpool, affiliated to the Copperbelt African Football Association. The team played their games at Mutende ground and was coached by Welfare Officer Jim Crow.

The British influence was unmistakable in the names Blackpool and later Wanderers, as well as the striped shirts that both teams wore. Some of the first players in the Wanderers team were Dominic Mwenya, George Kangwa, Joseph James Chongo, Hastings George Camukongo Bwalya Mpolokoso, Fidelis Bwete, McLean Kabwe, Alphonso Bwalya and Penius "Kapenta" Chirwa.

The newly formed team competed favourably against teams like Roan Mine, Nchanga Mine, Rhokana Mine, Luanshya All Blacks, Chingola Eleven Wise Men, Bancroft North End and town mates Blackpool. Apart from the main team, the club had two reserve sides whose games would precede those of the first team on match day.

In 1956, Samuel "Zoom" Ndhlovu, who would go on to become Wanderers' most iconic figure and Zambia's greatest forward of the sixties, joined the team from Kankoyo Mine School and started out in the third team. He was joined by George Sikazwe the following year and the two were the youngest members at the club. By 1959, goalkeeper Bwete and the trio of Ndhlovu, Sikazwe and Chirwa had formed a combination which would launch the team to greater heights. The same trio was co-opted into the welfare section of mine community development as club organizers together with Harwood Chimaliro, who would go on to serve as Wanderers' administrator for 20 years until his retirement in 1978.

=== 1960–1969: Beginning of dominance ===
In 1960, coach Crow and the club organizers went on a recruitment drive of talented youths at the various club centres within the mine township. This was how Laurent Chishala, Willie Kunda and Elijah Mwale became part of the team. Others were brothers Goodson and Sandford Mvula, Kenneth Simwanza, Joseph Menzu, Patrick Nkole and Rodson Chewe. The two reserve teams were still a feature so there was a steady supply of players and competition for places in the first team, of which Ndhlovu, Sikazwe and Chirwa were now part of, was very stiff.

In April 1962, Wanderers' home ground Shinde Stadium was opened and Tolomeo Mwansa joined the team as first choice goalkeeper. It was Hastings George Camukongo Bwalya Mpolokoso(1916 -1979) ( an accomplished mid-field football player with Mufulira Black Pool and Mufulira Wanderers in the 1950s, School Teacher and Acting Headmaster at Luanshimba School in Kabwe, School Teacher at Mufulira Mine School and at Buyantashi School in KamuChanga, Social Welfare Officer in Chibolya in Mufulira and School Headmaster at Nkulumashiba Primary School in Luanshya) who named 'Shinde Stadium' and he was given prize money of 3 British Pounds by Colonial Authorities. He appropriately named the stadium as 'Shinde' because the stadium opened in April and according to IciBemba, the month of April is called 'Shinde', the month associated with green harvest, an abundance of farm produce, happiness and fulfilment among people. In the same year the National Football League (NFL) was formed and the team's name changed to Mufulira Wanderers. Although the NFL only required a main team and one reserve side, Wanderers continued with their three team system which led to a formidable first team. While most teams in the NFL were mergers between their African and European versions, Wanderers were predominantly an all-African side for the simple reason that Mufulira was a political hot-bed during the colonial days. It was only in the late sixties when the political scene had settled that Scottish centre half Hugh McNeillie aptly named " the man of iron" and centre forward Tony Panter joined the club at the prompting of coach Doug Sammons and "Zoom" Ndhlovu. The composition of the team had by then changed into a mixture of youth and experience with McClean Kabwe, Ndhlovu and Sikazwe being the oldest players supported by younger players such as Dickson Makwaza, Joseph "Kanono" Musonda, Bedford Kaputo, Mwansa, Simwanza, Mwale, Kunda and Chishala. The inclusion of McNeillie at centre half steadied the defence and Dickson Makwaza in particular benefited from the presence of the rugged Scot.

After missing out on the inaugural NFL championship of 1962 which was won by Roan United, coach Doug Sammons retained the same team and Wanderers won the title the following year. This signalled the beginning of their dominance on the Zambian soccer scene.

The men from Shinde then set their sights on winning all of the silverware on offer, especially the Castle Cup. The reason for this was that from 1962, Northern Rhodesia (Zambia) and Southern Rhodesia (Zimbabwe) would compete for the Inter-Rhodesia Castle Cup which saw the Castle Cup champions of each country fighting for the prestigious Super Cup. In 1965, it was decided to do away with the trophy by having one last final, and that the winners of the trophy, which had previously been won by Southern Rhodesian clubs Bulawayo Rovers and Salisbury Callies, would keep the trophy for good. Wanderers won the right to compete in this final through by defeating City of Lusaka 5–2 in the local final with Kunda grabbing a hat-trick.

Wanderers left no stone unturned during preparations for the Super Castle Cup final. By this time, golfer Harry McQuillan was the coach, with Lewis Rennos as physical trainer. The final turned out to be one of the most famous matches in Zambian football history as the Mighty men squared off with City Wanderers before a racially segregated crowd of 18,000 on 17 October 1965 at Glamis Stadium in Salisbury. The Zambians took the lead with two quick goals from Kunda and Mwale but City pulled a goal back through striker Kenneth Makoni. Ndhlovu put Wanderers further ahead to leave the scores 3–1 at the break. Wanderers then allowed City back into the game when goals by captain Alan Hlathwayo and Richard Chimiya tied the game but with extra-time looming, Mwale cut in from the left to score a late and historic winner for a final score of 4–3.

After the match, the team returned to the dressing room and word soon went round that Ian Smith had unilaterally declared a state of Independence (UDI) so General Manager Hansworth of Wanderer's sponsors Roan Consolidated Mines, who had accompanied the team to Salisbury, ordered their hasty departure for the airport where they boarded their chartered plane without going through immigration formalities. On arrival at Ndola Airport, the players were driven home in private vehicles and the Super Castle Cup was permanently in Wanderers' custody.

Wanderers were the dominant team in Zambian football in the sixties and won the League a record 5 times, including 3 in a row from 1965 to 1967. Ndhlovu was, by then, player-coach, and he still thrilled fans everywhere as Wanderers played with his dribbling skills. He became the first footballer to win the Zambian Sportsman of the Year award in 1964 and there was a benefit match between Wanderers and Kitwe Sports to mark his 10 years in professional football in 1966.

The team built up a large following of admirers throughout Zambia and won several more cups including Zambia's inaugural Charity Shield in 1967. Their green and white striped shirts were widely regarded as a symbol of success. At this point, a number of talented schoolboys were welcomed into the team – Robertson Zulu from Kantanshi Secondary School while Mettu Mumba, Noah Chishiki and Abraham Nkole were picked from Mufulira Secondary.

In 1968, Ndhlovu left for a six-month coaching course with Blackpool in England and Sikazwe stood in as coach. In September 1969, striker Robertson Zulu set a club record by scoring 9 goals when Wanderers beat Kabwe United 14–1 in a Heinrich Cup tie, on his way to winning the Zambian League's top goal-scorer award and helping Wanderers to a fifth league title. Wanderers were a cut above the rest of the teams and it was around this time that they earned themselves the "Mighty" tag. Their success was attributed to having a fine reservoir of players as well as the good administration of the team.

=== 1970–1979: Dominance continues ===
The dominance continued into the seventies with Ndhlovu still a key player and Zambia national team captain Makwaza manning the defence. The team had a 'never-say-die' attitude and developed a habit of scoring late goals to win matches, often from a losing position. Thus the phrase "Mighty awina ichungulo" (bemba saying meaning 'Mighty wins in the dying minutes') was coined.

In 1970, Makwaza’a defensive partner in the national team Dick Chama joined Wanderers from Bancroft Blades although he returned to Blades after a season, at the end of which Wanderers finished second on the league table after Kabwe Warriors who ascended to the championship when the National Football League awarded them points for a match against Mindola United who had used an unregistered player. The decision took Warriors above Wanderers in the league standings, who in turn boycotted the prize giving ceremony and returned the runners-up trophy and prize money in protest.

Wanderers also had the distinction of featuring three brothers from the Nkole family in the same team – Abraham (who was a goalkeeper but at times played as a striker), and defenders Patrick and Edward. One memorable moment for the three was the 1971 Castle Cup final at Dag Hammarskjoeld Stadium in Ndola when they featured in the victorious Wanderers' team; with Abraham delivering a hat-trick to steer his team to a hard-fought 5–4 win against a resilient Roan United who had trailed 4–1 at the interval.

Bernard 'the Bomber' Chanda was a major signing from Roan United in 1971, finishing the season as joint top scorer in the Zambian league in 1973 although Wanderers had failed to win a single cup in the previous season as Warriors swept all the silverware on offer. They won the Castle Cup two years running in 1973–74, which they would keep for good as a new trophy was introduced. They were also the first winners of the Champion of Champions trophy in 1974 against town mates Blackpool though they finished as runners-up to Green Buffaloes in the league. They would go on to win the Champion of Champions cup six more times.

By virtue of winning the Champion of Champions trophy, Wanderers were Zambia's first representatives in the inaugural African Cup Winners Cup in 1975, the same year that Ackim Musenge joined the team from another Mufulira side Butondo Western Tigers together with Brines Mulenga and George Mungule. They lost to eventual winners Tonnerre Yaoundé of Cameroon in the quarter-finals. Later in the year, the Independence Cup replaced the Castle Cup and Wanderers' name was the first to be etched on the new trophy when they beat Green Buffaloes 2–1 in Lusaka. They however had to give up the cup the following year to town mates Blackpool who beat Butondo 4–3 in the final.

The emergence of Warriors with Godfrey Chitalu in red-hot form meant Wanderers faced stiff competition in the league. The Kabwe team won the league 3 times in a row as did Green Buffaloes so Wanderers had to wait until 1976 for their first title of the seventies. By this time, Ndhlovu had retired and striker Thomas Bwalya emerged as a key player who placed 5th during the voting for African Footballer of the Year in 1977, won by Tunisia's Dhiab Tarek. Zambian international midfielder Evans Katebe was another dependable player during this period.

Wanderers made history by becoming the first Zambian club to make it to the semi-finals of the Africa Club Champions Cup by beating Mouloudia Club d'Alger of Algeria 3–2 on aggregate in September 1977, after goals by Bwalya and Benson Musonda saw them wipe out a 2–1 first leg deficit.

In the semi-finals, they faced Hearts of Oak of Ghana in the first leg in Lusaka. Bwalya was on target once again, scoring a brace as Wanderers triumphed 5–2 but were eliminated on away goals after Hearts prevailed 3–0 in Accra. Wanderers repeated the feat the following year but this time in the Africa Cup Winners Cup when their quarter-final opponents Navy of Zanzibar withdrew but they lost the semi-final to Algerian club Milaha Athletic Hussein Dey (MAHD) featuring a 19-year-old Rabah Madjer, again on the away goals rule with a 2–2 aggregate score after winning the home leg 2–1.

Later that year, player power forced out the club's McDonald Mtine-led executive after some friction between members and the new management team which saw the return of former Chairman Efford Chirwa, celebrated a seventh league title at the end of the season.

When the Mighty men won the league title in 1978, it would be their last league triumph for almost 20 years. As Zambian Champions, Wanderers represented Zambia in the Africa Club Champions Cup in 1979. After defeating Simba of Tanzania 4–0 in Dar es Salaam in the first leg of the first round, Wanderers hosted the Tanzanians for the second leg on 1 April 1979 in Lusaka, in what appeared to be a formality game. It turned out to be a catastrophe as Wanderers were thrashed 5–0 and dumped out of the competition 4–5 on aggregate. The local press had a field day calling it Wanderers' 'most miserable performance in history' and 'a big April Fool's Day affair.'

=== 1980–1989: League title eludes Wanderers ===
After winning the league title in 1978, Wanderers experienced several near-misses for the next 15 years, and their record of 7 league titles was surpassed by rivals Nkana FC who set a new record of 11 league wins. They however continued to dominate cup competitions, earning the tag of Zambia's most 'winningest team', and becoming known as the 'legendary cup fighters' as they filled up their Chawama Hall trophy cabinet with all the cups on the local scene.

Ashols Melu joined the team in 1980 from Konkola Blades and Efford Chabala also established himself as first choice goalkeeper. The following year, brothers Benjamin and Kalusha Bwalya crossed over from Mufulira Blackpool and Wanderers would consistently finish in the top 5 of the league, finishing second in 1984, 1985 and 1989.

In the mid-eighties, players such as Charles Musonda and Johnson Bwalya featured prominently for Wanderers and when Chabala just missed out on the Footballer of the Year award to Kabwe Warriors' Jack Chanda in 1985, it prevented what would have been a five-year clean sweep after wins by Melu (1983), Kalusha Bwalya (1984), Johnson Bwalya (1986) and Melu again in 1987.

At the end of 1985, Kalusha left to play professional soccer with Cercle Brugge in Belgium and was followed by Musonda the following year. Wanderers beat Nkana 2–1 to win the BP Challenge Cup in July 1986 at the end of which Johnson also left for Swiss club Fribourg. The team enjoyed several cup successes in this period such as the Heroes & Unity Cup in 1985, 1987 and 1988 and the Independence Cup of 1988. In 1989, Melu signed up with Greek club Olympiacos for $100,000 which is still the record fee received by Wanderers for a player transfer.

=== 1990–99: League title returns to Shinde ===
When Melu's European career ended in 1992, he returned to find coach Ackim Musenge had left for greener pastures in Botswana so he joined the coaching bench with the team wallowing in mid-table. The following season, he replaced Michael Kapembwa as head coach and led the Mufulira team to second position at the end of the season. In 1994, Wanderers led the table for most of the season but faltered in the last 3 games and surrendered the lead and the title to Power Dynamos. The disappointment was blamed on Melu's frequent absences on national duty as he was one of the Zambia national team's assistant coaches.

The team carried on built around Collins Mbulo, Justin Kunda, Allan Kamwanga, Alex Musungu, Bilton Musonda, Vincent Mutale, Paul Chellah and Nelson Banda. The long wait for the league championship finally ended with back to back titles in 1995 and 1996. In January 1997 Melu died and his assistant George Lwandamina took over as coach, assisted by Frederick Kashimoto. Wanderers lost the league title to Dynamos but retained the Challenge Cup and this turned out to be their last trophy to date. When Allan Kamwanga served as Zambian captain in May 1998 in a COSAFA Cup game against Mozambique in Lusaka, it meant no less than six Wanderers players had captained the country – Ndhlovu, Makwaza, Musenge, Melu, Chabala and Kamwanga.

=== 2000–2009: Relegation ===
The end of the nineties saw a change in Wanderers' fortunes. The changing economic horizon saw Mufulira Mine taken over in a wholesale privatisation exercise and the new owners Mopani Copper Mine did not place recreational activities at the top of their priority list. Furthermore, conflicts within the club's executive did not help matters, with two rival executives fighting for control of the club at one point.

In 2000, the unthinkable happened; reduced funding meant Wanderers were no longer able to compete against their rivals and poor performance in the league culminated in their relegation to Division I when they finished 4th from the bottom. By a stroke of good fortune, Railway Express, a team which ended the season above them was disbanded and Wanderers retained their Super League status though there was an uproar from several quarters, not least from the teams which were next in line for promotion from the first division. However, the decision stood and Wanderers continued in the Super League.

In 2002, they found themselves in the same situation. Needing a win to survive relegation in their final game of the season against Nkwazi FC at Shinde on 16 November 2002, Wanderers could only manage a goalless draw and were demoted causing untold anguish among their fans. Reports went round of Wanderers trying to avoid relegation by pushing for an increase in the number of teams but lightning could not strike twice as the behind-the-scene manoeuvres came to nought and Wanderers found themselves playing Division I football the following season. This was the first time Wanderers had ever been relegated.

In 2004, Wanderers finished 2nd in Division I (North) and won promotion back to the top league but sponsorship and administration problems persisted and they made a swift return to the second tier.

Wanderers continued to struggle in Division I (North) under reduced funding from Mopani Copper Mines and regularly fallen short of the promotion places. In 2009, they were in strong contention for elevation behind fellow fallen giants Nkana FC, with Kamwanga as coach. While Nkana won promotion, Wanderers missed out on the second promotion slot to Ndola Lime.

=== 2010-2017: Struggles in Division I and return to the Premier League ===
In 2010, Kamwanga was replaced with former teammate Harrison Chongo, with the team drifting towards the relegation places.

The team started out well in the 2011 season and was second on the table but tragedy struck when Chongo was taken ill at half-time during a league game against Prison Leopards on 11 May 2011. He was rushed to hospital where he was treated for high-blood pressure but died the following day. The team then fell off the two promotion places.

Wanderers finished the 2011 season in 4th position with 13 wins, 5 defeats and 16 draws. When the team lost 4 league games only two months into the 2012 season, coach Kellies 'Paymaster' Mwaba was replaced by former Nchanga Rangers Assistant Coach Israel Mwanza in June 2012. After a reasonable start, the team dropped off towards the end and finished the season in 7th position.

When the 2013 season kicked off, Wanderers started with a point from their opening two games and this prompted the club to re-hire former coach, midfield legend Frederick Kashimoto. Mwanza briefly left Mufulira for Chingola in protest against the appointment until it was clarified that Kashimoto was coming in as an assistant coach. However, the poor results continued with a draw and two more losses in the next three games and in the last week of April 2013, the club executive announced that Mwanza had been fired and replaced by Emmanuel Nthala with Frederick Kashimoto as Technical Advisor, in an interim capacity, who led the team to 2–1 win away to Ndola United in their first match in charge.

In October 2013, both Kashimoto and Nthala were fired with Wanderers facing relegation in 14th position in the 18-team Division I North League, with 24 points from 26 matches. Moses Kashimoto was appointed as player-coach in an interim capacity. The team was almost demoted and finished the season in 14th place, only one place above the relegation places with seven wins, sixteen draws and eleven defeats.

In February 2014, former Zambian international defender Manfred Chabinga was named coach and tasked with returning Wanderers to the top league. He achieved this when Wanderers won promotion with a game to spare after coming from behind to draw with Grinaker FC in Chililabombwe and end a nine-year hiatus from the Zambian Premier League. Wanderers went on to lose the final league match 1–0 to Ndola United at Shinde to end the season in second place with 64 points, one behind champions Forest Rangers and a point ahead of Kalulushi Modern Stars.

Wanderers marked an impressive return to the Zambian top league by finishing in 5th position in the 2015 season. With the 2016 season barely a few weeks old, Chabinga announced that he had resigned citing frustration with reports from Mufulira suggesting the club executive members meddled in team selection and had conducted player transfers without consulting him.

The club then tried to appoint Egyptian Ahmed Suliman but had to backtrack when it emerged that he did not have the qualifications required to coach a Super Division side. Chabinga's former assistant Chewe Mulenga was appointed interim coach until July 2016 when Portuguese Paulo Jorge Silva signed a two-year deal.

What started out as an indifferent season turned into a downward spiral with the team going on a seven-game winless streak which culminated in a 4-0 humiliation to league leaders Zanaco on 10 September 2016. The result saw Wanderers slide into the relegation zone with four wins, seven defeats and fourteen draws and led to the sacking of Silva. Ahmed Suliman who had gone back to Egypt in the interim period and obtained his CAF 'C' Licence, was appointed in his place.

The team managed to preserve their Super League status thanks to back to back victories over NAPSA Stars and ZESCO United, which were their sixth and seventh wins of the season, to finish in 11th position. At the end of the season, they set an unenviable record for the most draws with eighteen.

An exodus of several key players during the off season saw Wanderers kick off the 2017 season with new faces and the team lost their first two games of the season including an embarrassing 4–1 home defeat to promotion side City of Lusaka and when Suliman took a swipe at the club's executive for letting go of influential players, he was sacked for admonishing the executive in the media.

Moses Kashimoto took charge on temporary basis but could not prevent a 6–0 thrashing at the hands of defending champions Zanaco. Former National Assembly, Nakambala Leopards and Napsa Stars coach Wilson Mwale was then engaged on a three-year deal but his first game ended in a 2–0 defeat to Lumwana Radiants leaving Wanderers bottom of the twenty team league with one goal scored and fifteen conceded.

Mwale however said he was confident of turning the situation around. "Let the supporters remain calm," he said in an interview with the Zambia Daily Mail. "I have taken over teams in worse conditions than Wanderers before, let them give me a bit of time. I think Mighty will be back where it is supposed to be. This is just the fourth game. Yes, we are losing for now but results will come very soon."

After 22 league matches, Mwale had only managed to win three and with the team still stuck in the relegation zone, the club's executive decided to move him up to the position of Technical Director and replaced him with his former assistant Justin Chinama. Despite an improvement in results, Wanderers could only finish fourth from bottom and were demoted at the end of the season.

However Wanderers won promotion in the 2018 season with one game to spare.

== Colours and badge ==
From the time the club was founded, its home colours were green and white stripes, white shorts and green socks until the 1970s when all green shirts were introduced. This has remained Wanderers' preferred kit over the years though at times, they have used an all green strip.

During the 1982 season, blue shirts and white shorts were introduced and in 1985, the team used an all blue strip. The 2016 season saw the return of the striped shirts reminiscent of the most successful period in the team's history, though this time with green shorts.

The Wanderers away strip has more often than not been all white, which is what the team is using currently. The current kits are designed by Mafro.

Wanderers were one of the first Zambian clubs to have a company's logo on its shirts, when they had Huyeco on their shirts in 1986. Since then, the name on the front of Wanderers' shirts has often been that of their main sponsors such as Mufulira Division of ZCCM in the late '80s and Mopani Copper Mines in 2014. However, there were several seasons in between when their shirts did not carry a company logo and when the club won the Zambian Premier League title in 1997 after a long period of failure, the shirts carried the club's nickname 'Mighty'. Wanderers currently have a kit sponsorship deal with Dickinson, a company contracted to Mopani.

For the most part, Wanderers' shirts did not carry a badge until the late '80's when a simple green and white ball surrounded by the words 'Mighty Mufulira Wanderers FC' was introduced, though it did not appear in all of the subsequent seasons. At the same time that the NATSAVE sponsorship was announced in April 2015, a new club logo was unveiled and it incorporates the team's year of establishment, a mine shaft, the team's nicknames surrounding a football on a shield, with a ribbon bearing the team's name at the bottom.

== Stadium ==
Shinde Stadium is Wanderers' home ground and is located in Section Eight of Mufulira mine township. It was opened in 1962 and prior to that, the team used Mutende ground which used to be in what is now Section Five of the mine township. The capacity of Shinde is 12,000 and the ground hosted national team matches in the sixties and seventies.

In the early eighties, Shinde was closed for renovations so Wanderers used Central Sports Ground for their home matches for the 1981 and 1982 seasons although this was also closed for part of 1981 after fans stoned visiting teams. Wanderers then had to use John Yumba Kachofa Stadium, the home of Mufulira Blackpool.

In June 2005 Wanderers lost a league match to 2–1 to Red Arrows at Shinde and fans accused the referee of biased officiating and ran amok. The riot left several vehicles damaged and the Football Association of Zambia responded by closing the stadium for the rest of the season.

In August 2008, Wanderers fans again rioted at Shinde when a league match against Kitwe United was abandoned following a pitch invasion when the home team conceded a late equalizer. The fans later took their anger into the stadium car park were they damaged United's team bus and official's vehicles. The punishment was again closure of the stadium for the rest of the season.

In July 2012, Mopani Copper Mine announced an allocation of US$100,000 for rehabilitation works at Shinde, conceding that the facility was in a state of disrepair. Phase one was planned to enhance security of the infrastructure before major rehabilitation works could commence. It involved construction of a wall boundary, perimeter fencing of the playing surface, referees' changing rooms and toilets and was completed in early April 2013. The second phase will involve work on the grandstand, terraces, electrical works, the camp house and club offices, Chawama Hall and sports complex and players' dressing rooms.

Wanderers planned to use John Yumba Kachofa Stadium for their home games during the 2013 season but had to change plans and moved to the much smaller Central Sports Ground after the collapse of a section of the perimeter wall at Kachofa Stadium.

Wanderers returned to Shinde halfway through the 2014 season and this added impetus to their promotion push. And at the end of the 2014 season, they secured promotion to the Super League after finishing second to Forest Rangers with a point's difference.

Shinde recently received a facelift and jointly hosted the COSAFA Under 20 Men's Tournament with Nkana Stadium in Kitwe sponsored by Mopani. These renovations are on-going.

== Honours ==
- Zambian League Championship: 9

1963, 1965, 1966, 1967, 1969, 1976, 1978, 1995, 1996

- Zambian Cup (Castle Cup/Independence Cup/Mosi Cup): 9

1965, 1966, 1968, 1971, 1973, 1974, 1975, 1988, 1995

- Zambian Challenge Cup (Shell Challenge Cup/BP Challenge Cup/ BP Top Eight Cup): 10

1964, 1967, 1968, 1969, 1978, 1984, 1986, 1994, 1996, 1997

- Heinrich Cup/Chibuku Cup/Heroes and Unity Cup: 7

1964, 1965, 1968, 1976, 1985, 1987, 1991

- Champion of Champions Cup: 7

1974, 1976, 1977, 1978, 1985, 1988, 1992

- Zambian Charity Shield: 6

1967, 1968, 1976, 1977, 1996, 1997

- Inter-Rhodesia Castle Cup: 1

1965

== Fans ==
Mufulira Wanderers has a large supporter base in Zambia. Supporters of the club have provided financial assistance and have participated in efforts to secure sponsorship agreements from corporate and civic organizations. The club's supporters are traditionally associated with the team's green and white colours and are represented by the MWFC-SS (Mufulira Wanderers Football Club - Supporters Society).

=== Apparel ===
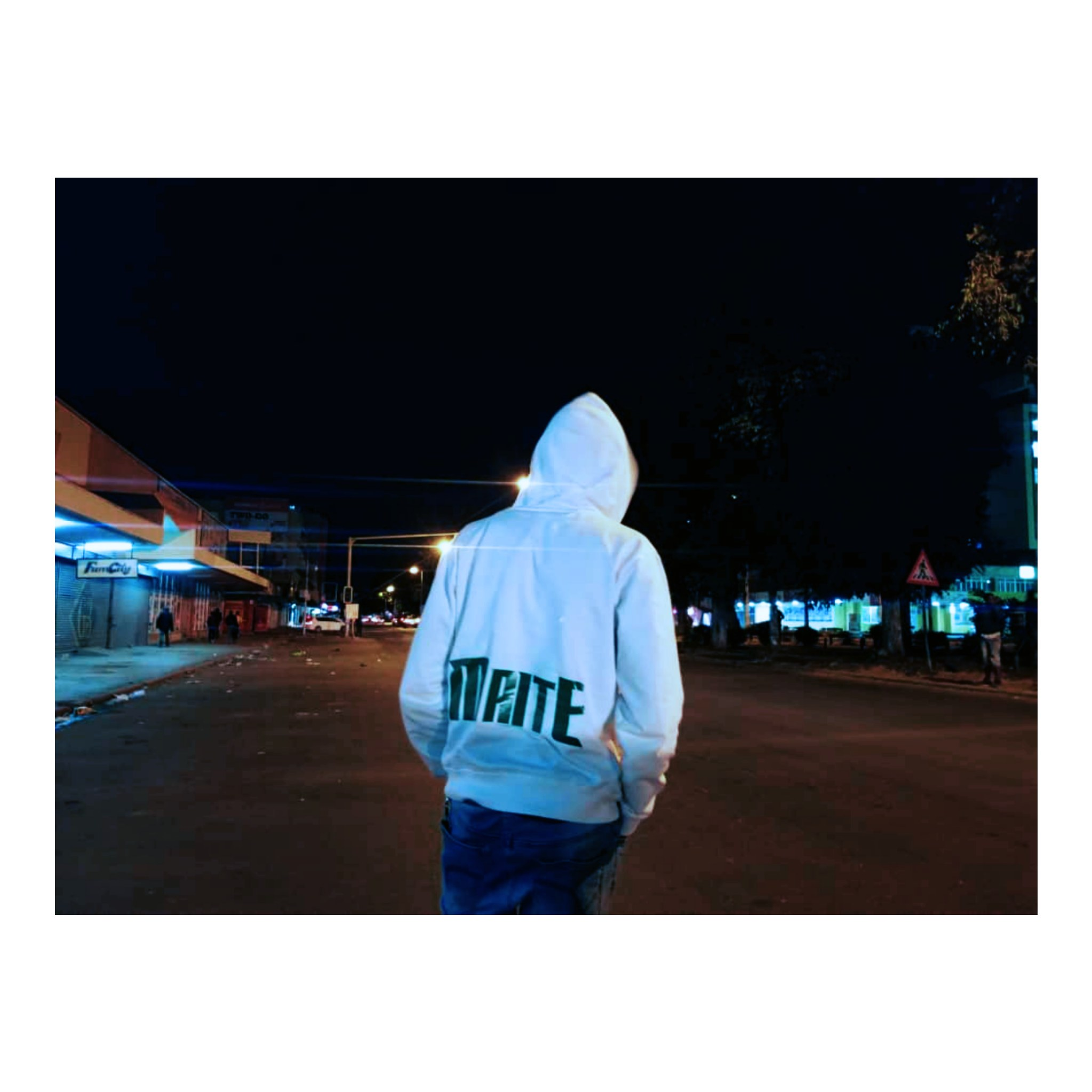
Mufulira Wanderers Supporter

Mufulira Wanderers Football Club in the recent past launched various branded clothing and personal items for sale to the public. This has been in a bid to resuscitate the public dominance of the club as well as supplement the dwindling financial support which comes from the sole sponsors.

== Sponsorship ==
Wanderers were originally funded by Mufulira Mine, under the Roan Consolidated Mines which changed to Mufulira Division of Zambia Consolidated Copper Mines in the eighties. They are currently being sponsored by Mopani Copper Mine.

=== Managers ===
- (England) Jim Crow (1953–59)
- (England) Doug Sammons (1960–64)
- (Republic of Ireland) Harry McQuillan (1965–66)
- (Zambia) Samuel Ndhlovu (1966–71)
- (Zambia) George Sikazwe (1971–77)
- (Zambia) Dickson Makwaza (1977–82)
- (Zambia) Samuel Ndhlovu (1982–84)
- (Zambia) Ackim Musenge (1985–92)
- (Zambia) Michael Kapembwa (1992–93)
- (Zambia) Ashious Melu (1993–97)
- (Zambia) George Lwandamina (1997–99)
- (Zambia) Samuel Ndhlovu (2000)
- (Zambia) George Lwandamina (2000–01)
- (Zambia) Frederick Kashimoto (2001–02)
- (Zambia) Alex Musungu (2002–05)
- (Zambia) Masautso Mwale (2005–07)
- (Zambia) Michael Kapembwa (2007–09)
- (Zambia) Allan Kamwanga (2009–10)
- (Zambia) Harrison Chongo (2010–11)
- (Zambia) Kellies Mwaba (2011–12)
- (Zambia) Israel Mwanza (June 2012–April 2013)
- (Zambia) Emmanuel Nthala (April 2013–Oct 2013)
- (Zambia) Moses Kashimoto (Oct 2013–Feb 2014)
- (Zambia) Manfred Chabinga (Feb 2014–April 2016)
- (Zambia) Chewe Mulenga (April 2016–July 2016)
- (Portugal) Paulo Jorge Silva (July 2016–Sept 2016)
- (Egypt) Ahmed Suliman (Sept 2016–April 2017)
- (Zambia) Moses Kashimoto (April 2017–April 2017)
- (Zambia) Wilson Mwale (April 2017–August 2017)
- (Zambia) Justin Chinama (August 2017-March 2019)
- (Zambia) Elijah Chikwanda (April 2019-October 2019)
- (Zambia) Anderson Phiri (October 2019-January 2020)
- (Zambia) Tenant Chembo (January 2020-December 2020)
- (Zambia) Harrison Tembo (December 2020 – 2022)

== Notable players ==
This is a list of notable footballers who have played for Mufulira Wanderers from when the club was formed in 1953 to the present. Generally, this means all players that have played 100 or more first-class matches for the club. However, some players who have played fewer matches are also included. This includes those who have represented their country whilst playing for the club, and players who have set a club playing record, such as goal scoring or transfer fee records.

- (Zambia) Benjamin Bwalya
- (Zambia) Johnson Bwalya
- (Zambia) Kalusha Bwalya
- (Zambia) Thomas Bwalya
- (Zambia) Efford Chabala
- (Zambia) Dick Chama
- (Zambia) Bernard Chanda
- (Zambia) Philemon Chisala
- (Zambia) Harrison Chongo
- (Zambia) Frederick Kashimoto
- (Zambia) Evans Katebe
- (Zambia) Philemon Kaunda
- (Zambia) Willie Kunda
- (Zambia) George Lwandamina
- (Zambia) Dickson Makwaza
- (Zambia) Gibby Mbasela
- (Zambia) Ashious Melu
- (Zambia) Philemon Mulala
- (Zambia) Ackim Musenge
- (Zambia) Charly Musonda
- (Zambia) Tolomeo Mwansa
- (Zambia) Samuel Ndhlovu
- (Zambia) George Sikazwe
