= Johnson Bwalya =

Zambian footballer (born 1967)

Personal information
- Date of birth: 3 December 1967 (age 58)
- Place of birth: Mufulira, Zambia
- Height: 1.74 m (5 ft 9 in)
- Position: Forward

Senior career*
Years	Team	Apps	(Gls)
1985	Butondo Western Tigers		
1986–1987	Mufulira Wanderers		
1987–1988	FC Fribourg		
1988–1989	FC Sion		
1988	→ MSV Duisburg (loan)	2	(0)
1989–1992	FC Fribourg	52+	(6+)
1992–1994	FC Bulle	43	(13)
1994–1995	SC Kriens	25	(5)
1995–1996	FC Luzern	22	(0)
1996–1998	SR Delémont	23+	(1+)

International career
1987–1997	Zambia	33	(7)
- * Club domestic league appearances and goals

Johnson Bwalya (born 3 December 1967) is a Zambian former professional footballer who played as a forward. He spent most of his career in Switzerland while representing the Zambia national team internationally. With Zambia, he participated at the 1988 Summer Olympics.

== Club career ==
Born in Mufulira, Bwalya attended Kantanshi Secondary school and began his career at hometown club Butondo Western Tigers. In 1986, he joined Mufulira Wanderers, winning Footballer of the Year in his first season at the club. At the end of the season, he signed for Swiss club FC Fribourg.

He later played for FC Sion, MSV Duisburg (on loan), FC Bulle, SC Kriens, FC Luzern, and SR Delémont.

== International career ==
Bwalya made his debut for the Zambia national team in April 1987 in an All Africa Games qualifier against Malawi in Lusaka and was part of the Zambia team that qualified to the 1988 Summer Olympics in Seoul. He scored a goal in Zambia's 4–0 win against Italy on their way to becoming the first African team to reach the quarter-finals of the tournament. After slipping past a defender, Bwalya hit a shot from nearly 35 yards that swerved and dipped just under the crossbar. In the game against West Germany which Zambia lost 4–0, he was injured. He did not feature for Zambia for the next four years.

Upon his recovery, Bwalya regained his form and won back his place in the national team and was to join up with the team for the Senegal game only to learn that the plane carrying the team had plunged into the sea in the Gabon disaster. When a new team was assembled it was Bwalya and Kalusha Bwalya that led the team, both of them scoring in a match against Morocco with Bwalya getting the winning goal with a 25-metre shot in 2–1 win.

Bwalya was part of the team that reached the final of the 1994 African Cup of Nations in Tunisia and was a stand-in captain in Kalusha's absence as the team also qualified to the 1996 African Cup of Nations in South Africa where they lost to Tunisia in the semi-finals.

At the 1996 African Cup of Nations, Bwalya was part of a Zambian team that won the bronze medal, scoring 15 goals in the process and defeating Egypt 3–1 in a come from behind quarter-final victory.

In 1997, Zambia drew a World Cup qualifier with South Africa 0–0 at Independence Stadium in Lusaka amid reports of a falling out between Bwalya and Kalusha Bwalya, with Bwalya unhappy with the latter's influence on team selection. Later that year, Bwalya as captain led Zambia and lifted the inaugural COSAFA Castle Cup.

When new coach German Burkhard Ziese took over the reins of the national team in late 1997, he accused Bwalya of having the wrong attitude by not attending a team meeting and dropped him from the team travelling to 1998 African Cup of Nations where Zambia was knocked out in the group stages.
