= Evans Katebe =

Zambian footballer (born 1960)

Personal information
- Date of birth: March 17, 1960 (age 66)
- Place of birth: Zambia
- Position: Midfielder

Senior career*
Years	Team	Apps	(Gls)
–	Mufulira Wanderers		

International career
1978–1980	Zambia	7	(0)
- * Club domestic league appearances and goals

Evans Katebe (born March 17, 1960) was a Zambia football midfielder who played for Zambia in the 1978 African Cup of Nations and in 1980 Summer Olympics. He also played for Mufulira Wanderers.
