= Charly Musonda (footballer, born 1969) =

Zambian footballer

Charles Musonda
Personal information
- Full name: Charles Musonda
- Date of birth: 22 August 1969 (age 57)
- Place of birth: Mufulira, Zambia
- Position: Midfielder

Youth career
- Mufulira Wanderers

Senior career*
Years	Team	Apps	(Gls)
1986–1987	Cercle Brugge	19	(1)
1987–1997	Anderlecht	109	(6)
1996–1997	→ Sacramento Scorpions (loan)	0	(0)
1997–1998	Energie Cottbus	0	(0)
Total		128	(7)

International career^{‡}
1988–1993	Zambia	48	(4)
- * Club domestic league appearances and goals as of 4 July 2007 ‡ National team caps and goals as of 4 July 2007

Charles Musonda (born 22 August 1969) is a Zambian former professional footballer. At his peak, he played as a midfielder for Belgian club Anderlecht.

== Career ==
His debut as a professional for Zambia came in 1988 against Ghana in Lusaka which Zambia won 2–0 and Musonda did not disappoint, tellingly imposing himself on the game. He was one of the star players at the 1988 Summer Olympics in Seoul as Zambia reached the quarter-finals, trouncing Italy and Guatemala with 4–0 scorelines along the way.

When a plane carrying the Zambian National team developed problems and plunged into the Atlantic Ocean off the coast of Gabon on 28 April 1993 killing all 30 people on board including crew members and Football Association of Zambia president Michael Mwape, Musonda was traumatised as he was supposed to have been on the same plane. According to one report, he was called up by the national coach Godfrey Chitalu for the 1994 World Cup qualification match against Senegal but Anderlecht's team manager, Michel Verschueren, asked him to refuse the invitation and to play for Anderlecht, which Musonda did and therefore missed the fateful flight, though in an interview Musonda himself disclosed that when he first heard about the plane crash, he was in bed recovering from knee surgery and that was what saved his life. He would undergo seven operations on the same knee between 1991 and 1996.

Musonda returned to Belgium and first worked as a youth coach at AA Ghent before moving to Anderlecht to become a youth coach, scout and assistant trainer for the first team.

== Personal life ==
Musonda has three sons Lamisha, Tika, and Charly Jr. who all featured for Anderlecht's youth teams. Musonda's son Lamisha featured in the goal project with David Beckham. In June 2012, they joined Chelsea's youth ranks.

== Honours ==
=== Club ===
Anderlecht

- Belgian First Division: 1990–91, 1992–93, 1993–94, 1994–95
- Belgian Cup: 1987–88, 1988–89, 1993–94
- Belgian Super Cup: 1985, 1987, 1993, 1995
- European Cup Winners' Cup: 1989-90 (runners-up)
