= Dickson Makwaza =

Zambian footballer and coach (1942–2019)

Personal information
- Full name: Dickson Kenneth Makwaza
- Date of birth: 11 February 1942
- Place of birth: Mazabuka, Northern Rhodesia
- Date of death: 29 June 2019 (aged 76)
- Position: Defender

Senior career*
Years	Team	Apps	(Gls)
1961–1976	Mufulira Mine Team (later Mufulira Wanderers)		

International career
1965–1975	Zambia	74	(0)

Managerial career
- 1977–1982: Mufulira Wanderers
- 1983–1993: Roan United
- 1994: Bloemfontein Celtic F.C.
- 1994–1997: Botswana Meat Commission FC
- 1998–1999: Comets FC
- 2000–2001: Indeni FC
- 2003–2004: Roan United
- * Club domestic league appearances and goals

Dickson Kenneth Makwaza (15 July 1942 – 29 June 2019) was a Zambian football player and coach. Nicknamed "Barbed-Wire" due to his tenacity in defence, he was one of the most decorated players in Zambian soccer history and was captain of the Zambia national team that made its first ever appearance at the African Cup of Nations tournament in Egypt in 1974. Makwaza also captained Mufulira Wanderers and was voted Zambian footballer of the year in 1973. He later coached Wanderers and several other club sides.

== Early life ==
Makwaza was born in Mazabuka to Sweet Makwaza and Mangalita Chiinga. He started his primary school at Jeans School where he enjoyed playing football, and later went to Church of Christ School in Livingstone. After his father died in 1959, he went to Namwianga Secondary School and developed his football skills as a right winger.

== Playing career ==
=== Club career ===
He found established players such as Samuel Ndhlovu, George Sikazwe, Pennius "Kapenta"Chirwa, the Mvula brothers Goodson and Sandford, John Mwewa, Edward Musonda, James Phiri, Kenneth Simwanza, Joseph Menzu, Patrick Nkole, Rodson Chewe, Laurent Chishala and Richard "Magician" Changwe. Later, younger players like Bedford Kaputo, Tolomeo "Juva" Mwansa, Willie "Orlando" Kunda, Elijah "Kapilipili" Mwale, Joseph "Kanono" Musonda and Makwaza himself, started featuring more prominently in the team.

In 1964, Makwaza switched to defence when Wanderers travelled to Chingola to play Nchanga Rangers with a shortage of defenders as "Kanono" Musonda was unavailable due to work duties with the mines. To the pleasant surprise of his teammates and coaches, Makwaza gave a good account of himself and it was decided to make the move permanent.

Due to his time as a winger early in his career, Makwaza won many admirers as a skilful and ball playing centre-half. He played in one of the most famous football matches in Zambian history – the final of the Super Castle Cup between Wanderers and Salisbury Wanderers of Southern Rhodesia which the Zambian side won 4–3 on 17 October 1965.

Makwaza played his club football solely for Wanderers and quit football in 1975. The following year, he became a coach for Wanderers who went on to win the league. His experience was however called upon as he made some appearances towards the end of the season. In March 1977, he became the team's head coach, replacing George Sikazwe.

=== International career ===
In 1965, Makwaza made his debut against Kenya in September 1965 when Zambia won the Rothmans Soccer trophy in a three match series in Ndola, Kitwe and Lusaka.

Makwaza was first named captain of the national team in June 1967, replacing Howard Mwikuta. However, the captainship rotated as Mwila and Chama took turns in leading the squad.

Makwaza regained the armband and was named permanent skipper in August 1969 after Zambia lost 2–1 away to Cameroun to bow out of the 1970 CAN race.

== Coaching career ==
Makwaza was first appointed Wanderers coach in 1976 and became head coach in March 1977, the year Wanderers made history by becoming the first Zambian club to make it to the semi-finals of the Africa Club Champions Cup. They beat Moulodia of Algeria 3–2 on aggregate in September 1977, after goals by Bwalya and Benson Musonda saw them wipe out a 2–1 first leg deficit.

In the semi-finals, they beat Hearts of Oak of Ghana 5–2 in the first leg in Lusaka but were eliminated on away goals after Hearts prevailed 3–0 in Accra. The fallout from this was that the Wanderers' executive was purged and Makwaza was reportedly sidelined and replaced by Ndhlovu. However, Makwaza returned to lead the team to, as well as feature in, that year's Independence Cup final which they lost to Roan United 3–2. He however refused to blame the team's poor performance on the administrative upheavals.

A dejected Makwaza attributed the loss to his players taking the game casually and issued a public apology for the debacle – "I hope that any team that will be given a chance to represent the country in future will do better than us."

In March 1982, Wanderers supporters held a meeting at which they discussed the lack of progress by the club in the last three years in which the club had failed to win a single trophy and laid the blame on the coach. When Makwaza heard of what had transpired, he tendered his resignation which the club accepted.

Makwaza then moved to Roan United in Luanshya as coach and won the 1983 BP Challenge Cup when Roan beat favourites Rhokana United 2–0 in Lusaka. Makwaza would stay with Roan until 1993 when he moved to South Africa and coached Bloemfontein Celtic in 1994. That same year he moved to Botswana where he coached Botswana Meat Commission FC and led them to a second-place finish in the league and won the Coca-Cola Cup. Afterwards he coached Comets from 1998 to 1999 then returned to Zambia to join Indeni FC with whom he stayed from 2000 to 2001. Thereafter he made his way back to Roan United and became their coach in 2003. From 2005 to 2008, he served as the team's Technical Advisor.

== Later life and death ==
He died on 29 June 2019, aged 76.
