= Shinde Stadium =

Coordinates: 12°32′33″S 27°50′47″E

Shinde Stadium is a multi-use stadium in Mufulira, Zambia. It is currently used mostly for football matches and serves as the home for Mufulira Wanderers F.C. The stadium holds 18,000 people.
