= Jack Chanda =

Zambian footballer and coach (1958-1993)

Personal information
- Full name: Jack Chanda Mwinuna
- Birth name: Pearson Mwinuna
- Date of birth: 16 June 1958
- Place of birth: Luanshya, Northern Rhodesia
- Date of death: 20 April 1993 (aged 34)
- Place of death: Kabwe, Zambia
- Positions: Attacking midfielder; forward

Youth career
- 1973–1975: Mpatamatu Mine Police

Senior career*
Years	Team	Apps	(Gls)
1975–1978	Buseko Football Club		
1978–1982	Roan United		
1982–1983	Nkana Red Devils		
1983–1988	Kabwe Warriors		

International career
1981–1987	Zambia		

Managerial career
- 1988–1991: Kabwe Warriors
- 1991: Railway Express FC
- 1991–1993: Notwane FC
- * Club domestic league appearances and goals

Jack Chanda Mwinuna (born Pearson Mwinuna; 16 June 1958 – 20 April 1993) was a Zambian footballer and coach. He played for three of Zambia's biggest clubs Roan United, Nkana Red Devils and Kabwe Warriors in a successful career that saw him being crowned as Zambian Footballer of the Year in 1985.

== Playing career ==
Chanda was born as Pearson Mwinuna in Luanshya to Satyele Machanda Mwinuna, a miner, and Bertha Mwinuna. He was the second born in a family of ten of which three were boys and his grandfather was Chief Mwinuna of the Lamba-speaking people of Mpongwe District.

He attended Makoma Primary School and later Roan Antelope Secondary School together with his immediate younger brother Lackson. This was at a time when names from certain regions of the country would be made fun of and with a banal first forename, Chanda decided to change his name. He chose the catchy first name of "Jack" and assumed his father's middle name Machanda, which later changed to Chanda, the same as that of his hero and Roan United star, Bernard Chanda. By this time, Chanda had decided on a career in football and Lackson followed in his footsteps and took up the name as well. The duo ended up playing together at primary, secondary, club and national team level.

Chanda spent his youth years with Mpatamatu Police Amateur Club before joining FAZ Division III side Buseko Football Club in 1975. He was then signed by top league team Roan United in 1978 and featured for the Zambia Schools National Team in the same year alongside future international teammates John Kalusa and Ashols Melu.

He soon became one of Roan's stand-out attacking players but silverware eluded the Luanshya side with several mid-table finishes. When Roan were relegated at the end of the 1981 season, he signed for Kitwe giants Nkana Red Devils the following season. The fans of the Kitwe team were delighted with the signing which was regarded as a major coup.

Playing in a central role as a second striker in the number ten shirt, he helped Nkana win their first-ever league title at the end of the season. It was a tightly contested race and going into the final three games of the season, Nkana's fiercest rivals Power Dynamos were the only team with any hope of denying Nkana their maiden title triumph but Dynamos’ failure to beat Strike Rovers, in a 1–1 at home confirmed Nkana's title win.

When the two teams met in the final game of the season, at Nkana Stadium on 12 December 1982, Dynamos were bent on inflicting a first defeat of the campaign on the champions who had been unbeaten throughout the season and when Peter Kaumba gave Dynamos a 20th-minute lead, it looked like Nkana's record was on the line until Chanda headed in an 88th-minute equalizer to preserve Nkana's unbeaten record and spark wild scenes of euphoria at the final whistle.

Chanda however stunned the Kitwe club when he left Nkana soon after their title winning season for Kabwe Warriors and the fans never forgave him for this. It meant 90 minutes of abuse for Chanda whenever Warriors traveled to Nkana, and this went on for years. Chanda's first piece of silverware with Warriors was the Independence Cup which they won in 1984.

On 10 April 1985, Warriors traveled to Kitwe to take on Nkana in a league match and the home side appeared to be on their way to a comfortable victory when they took a commanding 3–0 lead into the break but Warriors mounted a spirited comeback and scored three goals in six minutes to tie the game, with Chanda grabbing a brace in the 77th and 78th minutes. The stunned crowd watched on in disbelief as defender John Mwanza headed in the equalizer nine minutes from time. It was too much to bear for the Red Devil's fans who rioted after the match and shattered four windows of the Warriors’ team bus and were unforgiving of Chanda for his role in the drama.

Later that year, Chanda missed a penalty in the semi-final of the Independence Cup against First Division side Malaiti Rangers to send Warriors crashing out after a 4–4 draw. At the end of the season, Chanda was rewarded with the Zambian Footballer of the Year award.

The following season, Chanda suffered a serious injury in Warriors’ second league game of the campaign against Strike Rovers in April 1986, after a reckless challenge by Isaac Khondowe in the 5th minute of the match and after he was carried off, Warriors fans almost stormed the field while his teammates were incensed and had to be calmed down by coach Godfrey Chitalu. Warriors won the match 3-1 but Chanda's injury turned out to be a compound fracture of the right fibula and Chitalu remarked that he was saddened because Chanda had probably been robbed of his career while at his peak. Chanda underwent an operation but the doctors who attended to him said it was unlikely that he would play again that season.

A great career appeared to have been cut short but Chanda surprised soccer followers when he made a comeback the following season, and attributed it to his love of the game and not allowing himself to think too much about the injury unlike other players who had failed to come back from serious injury. “When you love the game and you are really determined, then there is nothing that can stop you,” said Chanda after his successful comeback. He found that most of his compatriots like Albert Bwalya, John Mwanza and Clement Banda had moved on but working with a young crop of players, such as Timothy Mwitwa, Samuel Chomba, James Chitalu, Linos Chisanga, Noel Chama and Moxon Mugala, he led Warriors to the 1987 league championship.

Warriors lost the Heroes & Unity Cup final to Mufulira Wanderers 3-1 but won the Independence Cup when they beat Power 3-2 and got their revenge over Wanderers when they beat them 2–1 in the Champion of Champions final in a trophy-laden season.

Chanda ended the season as the second highest scorer after Bonnie Muma of Power Dynamos. The following year, Warriors’ coach Bizwell Phiri quit to take up a coaching job in South Africa and Chanda succeeded him.

== National team ==
Chanda was first selected to play for the Zambia ‘B’ team against Angola in Ndola in November 1980 in a match which ended in a 1–1 draw, and he featured at that year's CECAFA Cup in Sudan where Zambia reached the semi-finals. He made his full international debut as a right winger in June 1981 in Chingola when Zambia beat Zaire 3-1 and was on the score sheet two days later when the two teams drew 3–3 in Lusaka. Chanda was also in the team that overcame Morocco to qualify for CAN 1982 on a 3-2 aggregate.

Chanda featured twice at CAN 1982 as Zambia reached the semifinals. In April 1983, Zambia narrowly lost the first leg of CAN qualifying to Sudan 2-1 and in the second leg, attacked at will but could not get the single goal that they needed to progress to CAN 1984 and despite being their main threat upfront, Chanda was substituted in the second half for Ashols Melu. After the match, Sudanese coach Mohammed Abdin called the decision to substitute Chanda ‘an act of self-elimination’ as they regarded him as the most dangerous striker in the Zambian team.

Chanda featured prominently for Zambia at CECAFA 1984 when Zambia won the trophy after years of failure though he missed the final after accumulating two yellow cards.

In April 1985, Chanda had what was probably his best game in a Zambian shirt when Zambia thrashed Cameroon 4–1 in a World Cup qualifier in Lusaka and he was voted man of the match despite Michael Chabala scoring three goals. Zambia comfortably saw out the second leg 1–1 in Yaoundé and Chanda's skillful play led to Cameroonian fans dubbing him the African Pele.

In the next round, Zambia came up against Algeria and trailing 2-0 from the first leg, coach Brightwell Banda called up Chanda's younger brother Lackson, who was the leading scorer at his club Vitafoam United, to add some much needed fire power to Zambia's attack. A centre-forward at his club, Lackson started the game on the right wing and with Chanda at inside-left, the siblings made history as the first brothers to feature in the same match for Zambia.

Despite a spirited fight Zambia could find no answer to Algeria's solid defence with goalkeeper Nacerdine Drid in outstanding form, and lost 1–0 on a breakaway goal by Tedj Bensaoula. Lackson was substituted at half-time and it turned out to be his only appearance for the national team.

Later that year, Chanda scored the goal that sealed Zambia's progression to CAN 1986 at the expense of Nigeria in Lusaka 1–0. Chanda was by then the vice-captain of Zambia and in Jones Chilengi’s absence, captained the team to a four team tournament in Zaire involving the hosts, Zambia, Egypt and Ivory Coast where Zambia emerged second after two wins and a defeat to Egypt, all by 1–0 score lines.

An inexperienced Zambia did not have a very good outing to Egypt during CAN 1986, bowing out at the group stage after one draw and two defeats in a tough group that also featured Cameroon, Algeria and Morocco.CAN 1986

Chanda then sustained a broken leg in a league match against Strike Rovers in April 1986 which ruled him out of action for the rest of the year. He made a comeback the following year and was recalled to the national team, making a substitute appearance when Zambia beat Uganda 5–0 in an Olympic Games qualifier in Lusaka in November 1987. It turned out to be his last game for Zambia as he was left out of that year's CECAFA Cup squad.

== Coaching career ==
Chanda obtained his coaching diploma in West Germany and when title winning coach Bizwell Phiri left to take up a job in South Africa early in the 1988 season, Chanda was named Warriors coach. Warriors however lost their league crown to Nkana.

The following season, Warriors won the Challenge Cup, lost the Independence Cup final to Nkana but beat the same team 2–0 to win the Champion of Champions trophy a few weeks later. Warriors league performances continued to slip as they finished in the second half of the table in 9th place. Disaster struck for Warriors in 1990 when they were demoted from the Super League.

Chanda was relieved of his duties the following season and reassigned to another Zambian Super League team Railway Express FC who shared the same sponsors as Warriors. He however was not happy at Express and moved to Botswana halfway through the season to take over as coach at Notwane.

== Death ==
In early 1993, Chanda began experiencing poor health and he returned to Zambia in partial paralysis and was admitted to Kabwe General Hospital with breathing difficulties. He spent four weeks there before dying on 20 April 1993, a week before the Gabon air crash which claimed the lives of 18 Zambia national team players

== Honours ==
=== Player ===
- Zambian Super League: 1982, 1987
- Independence Cup: 1984, 1987
- Champion of Champions: 1987

=== Individual ===
- Zambian Footballer of the Year: 1985

=== Manager ===
- Challenge Cup: 1989
- Champion of Champions: 1989
