= Kenneth Malitoli =

Zambian footballer and coach (born 1966)

Personal information
- Date of birth: 20 August 1966 (age 60)
- Place of birth: Kitwe, Zambia
- Positions: Striker; midfielder

Youth career
- 1981–1984: Ajax (Rhokana United Youth Club)

Senior career*
Years	Team	Apps	(Gls)
1984–1992	Nkana Red Devils		
1992–1996	Espérance		
1996–1997	El Etiffaq		
1998–2000	Nkana		
2001	Indeni FC		

International career
1988–1999	Zambia	80	(19)

Managerial career
- 2001: Indeni
- 2002: Kitwe United
- 2003–2004: Kitwe Flying Bombers
- 2004–2006: Forest Rangers
- 2007: Nkana
- 2007–2009: Nchanga Rangers
- 2009–2010: Kalulushi Modern Stars
- 2011 – 2013: Livingstone Pirates
- 2014 –: Lusaka City Council
- * Club domestic league appearances and goals

Kenneth Malitoli (born 20 August 1966) is a Zambian coach and former footballer. Nicknamed 'Bubble', Malitoli is one of Zambia's most decorated players and was Zambian league top scorer in three consecutive seasons, as well as top scorer in Tunisia in 1993 and 1994. He is regarded as Nkana Football Club's most prolific striker after Bernard Chanda. He won the CAF Champions League with Tunisian club Espérance in 1994 and featured at four CAN tournaments in 1990, 1994, 1996 and 1998. Malitoli is currently coaching Zambian Division I South side Lusaka City Council.

== Early life ==
Malitoli was born in Kitwe and he attended Wusakile Primary and Mindolo Secondary Schools. He first joined Rhokana United's Ajax Youth Academy in 1981 before being promoted to the main team three years later.

== Playing career ==
=== Club career ===
Malitoli was still a schoolboy when he made his debut in the 1985 season in a star-studded Rhokana side which had by then been renamed Nkana Red Devils. The centre of Nkana's attack featured Zambian stars Jericho Shinde and Michael Chabala so the teenaged Malitoli had to be content with a place on the wing, fighting it out with Jerry Kaoma, Beston Chambeshi, Golden Kazika and James Jengela for the two wide slots. He won his first piece of silverware that year when Nkana pipped Power Dynamos to the league title. He would go on win four more Zambian league championships in a trophy-laden career with Nkana who dominated the Zambian soccer scene for more than a decade. Malitoli's elder brother Mordon also featured for Nkana as a defender.

Malitoli won the Zambian league's top goal scorer award in 1989 and repeated the feat twice more in succession in 1990 and 1991, and declared that should he not clinch a professional contract outside Zambia in the 1992 season, then he would certainly retain the award as it had become ‘personal-to-holder.’

Malitoli's exploits in front of goal brought him to the attention of foreign scouts and 1. FC Union Berlin and after impressing on trial, he was set to join the German club in 1991 but changed his mind and turned back at Lusaka International Airport, deciding that the monetary aspect of the deal was not worthwhile. After more negotiations, Malitoli got an improved offer but when he was left out of Zambia's 1992 CAN squad, the German club, disappointed at not seeing their target in action at the continental showpiece, changed their minds and instead signed on his club mate Gibby Mbasela who impressed at the tournament, with Nkana officials agreeing to swapping the two players on the same contract terms.

To his credit, Malitoli took this development with good grace and wished Mbasela well, who became the first Nkana player to play professional football in Europe. "I'm not bitter at all about losing out on the German deal. Maybe it just wasn't my time but Gibby's and when my time comes, I shall be ready to go," he said, adding that he was not angry with whoever had decided to leave him out of Zambia's Nations Cup squad.

Malitoli instead signed for Tunisian Giants Espérance in the 1992 summer transfer window and was top scorer in his first full season with 18 league goals. He repeated the feat the following season when he scored 14 goals to tie with Abdelkader Belhassen as top goal scorer, and became the first Zambian player to win the CAF Champions League when Espérance beat Zamalek of Egypt 3–1 on aggregate in 1994. He also won the 1995 CAF Super Cup when Espérance beat Motema Pemba 3–0.

In 1996, Malitoli left Espérance and signed for Saudi Arabian club El Ettifaq where he stayed for a year before returning to Zambia to rejoin Nkana and played for the Kitwe giants until the beginning of the 2001 season after which moved to Indeni FC of Ndola as player/coach. With the demotion of Indeni from the top league, Malitoli retired from the game and joined promotion side Kitwe United as coach the following season.

=== International career ===
With his goal-scoring exploits at club level, it was just a matter of time before he got his call-up to the national team and after featuring for Zambia's U-19 team, he made a dream international debut, scoring twice in a 2–1 friendly win against Zimbabwe in May 1988 in Harare. Despite the auspicious start, Malitoli did not become a regular in the national team as he found it difficult to replicate his club form. As a result, he missed out on the 1988 Olympic Games where Zambia reached the quarterfinals.

He scored twice when Zambia beat Gabon 3–0 in a CAN qualifier in July 1989 and also featured for Zambia at the CECAFA tournament later that year, where Zambia reached the semi-finals. He was in the Zambian squad at CAN 1990 though a mix-up meant that he missed the opening 1–0 win over Cameroon, as his name was not on the initial squad list sent to CAF, but he featured in three of the remaining matches.

He scored a goal when Zambia beat Zimbabwe 3–1 to lift the SADCC cup in Gaborone in August 1990 but was left out of the Zambian team in 1991, missing out on a second CECAFA trophy when Zambia triumphed in Uganda.

Malitoli himself admitted that he would fail to perform for the national team, with fans at Independence Stadium regularly calling for his substitution. He was also left out of Zambia's CAN 1992 squad and as a result lost out on a contract with 1. FC Union Berlin but he got over the disappointment by signing for Tunisian club Espérance. He featured for Zambia against Madagascar in a World Cup qualifier in January 1993, his assist leading to Kelvin Mutale's opening goal in a 3–1 win though his tame performance led to a substitution in the second half raising doubts as to whether his services would be called upon again, with stiff competition for the forward places offered by younger players like Mutale, Moses Masuwa and Kenan Simambe.

Zambian football was then dealt a tragic blow when the national team perished in the plane crash of 27 April 1993 off the Gabonese coast and Malitoli was one of the experienced players called upon to lead a young team. By this time, he was now playing in a deeper midfield role and was more effective, becoming a permanent fixture as Zambia just missed out on 1994 World Cup qualification and reaching the CAN 1994 final in Tunis where he emerged as Zambia's joint top scorer, netting the winning goal against Ivory Coast in the group stage and the last goal in Zambia's 4–0 defeat of Mali in the semi-finals.

He was on the score sheet when Zambia beat Egypt 4–0 in Cairo in August 1994 to win the Egypt '94 tournament and captained the team in Roald Poulsen's first game as Zambian coach, a 1996 CAN Cup qualifier against South Africa in Lusaka. With an out of sorts Zambia trailing to a Doctor Khumalo goal, a rash challenge by Phil Masinga on Happy Sichikolo led to a penalty with four minutes to go. Under the pressure of a restless home crowd, no one seemed particularly interested in taking the penalty so Malitoli stepped up. He later recalled: “There was tension in the stadium. I stepped forward. I said to myself, ‘After all, Independence Stadium does not like me so even if I miss, the status quo will continue so if I score, it will be a bonus. Malitoli scored the penalty to tie the game and would go on to captain the Zambian team in Kalusha Bwalya's absence. Malitoli had his best times in a Zambian shirt in this midfield role, scoring more goals than he did as a striker.

He was one of Zambia's key performers at CAN 1996 where the team emerged third and won the inaugural COSAFA Cup the following year. He also featured for Zambia in their first round exit at CAN 1998 under Burkhard Ziese. His last game in a Zambian shirt came when he captained the side in a 7–1 debacle to Honduras in San Pedro Sula on 16 December 1999. When Zambian coach Ben Bamfuchile named his 23-man CAN squad, Malitoli's name was not on the final list.

== Coaching career ==
Malitoli first cut his coaching teeth at Nkana as assistant player-coach to Patrick Phiri in 2000 and then moved to relegation strugglers Indeni as player-coach the following year to replace Dickson Makwaza but when Indeni were demoted from the Zambian Premier League, he retired from the game and joined promotion side Kitwe United as coach early in 2002. He however left in October after a poor run of results and was replaced by Peter Kaumba.

He then moved to Division II North club Flying Bombers of Kitwe. In September 2004, he was appointed coach of Ndola side Forest Rangers where he stayed for two years, and was on the move again in January 2007, when he replaced Jericho Shinde as Head Coach of Nkana, who were then in Division I and aiming to return to the top league and after a flying start that saw them go on a 13 match unbeaten run to open up a 14-point gap. Nkana decided against renewing Malitoli's short-term contract for a further six months due to what the club termed budgetary constraints though the move appeared to have been triggered by Nkana picking up just two points in five games after the team was banned from using their home ground due to crowd trouble.

He then joined Nchanga Rangers in September of that year, replacing Dick Ngwenya but the club terminated his contract after two seasons because he had not moved from his home town Kitwe to Chingola which is only 44 km away. He then joined Kalulushi Modern Stars and during his time as Kalulushi coach, he also served as assistant U-17 national team coach.

He left Stars in 2010 and the following year in February, was appointed coach of Livingstone Division I side Livingstone Pirates. In October 2013, Malitoli was suspended following a streak of poor results, with the club explaining that he was still the coach and was just on suspension. However, the club relieved Malitoli of his duties at the end of the season and he moved to Lusaka City Council F.C. mid-way through the 2014 season.

== Political career ==
In 2001, Malitoli ran for election as a member of parliament in Kitwe's Wusakile constituency, on the Heritage Party ticket. From a field of 9 candidates, he polled 11.75% of the votes to emerge second.

He has not been active in politics since then.

== Personal life ==
Malitoli is a widower after he lost his wife Given, with whom he had two children, in October 2003. He also has two children from a previous relationship.
