= Michael Chabala (Zambian footballer) =

Zambian footballer and coach

Personal information
- Position: Forward

Senior career*
Years	Team	Apps	(Gls)
1977	Mufulira Blackpool		
1978–1981	Vitafoam United Ndola		
1981–1987	Nkana Red Devil		
1988	Kalulushi Modern Stars		

International career
1985–1986	Zambia	7	(4)

Managerial career
- 1989: Kalulushi Modern Stars
- Chambishi F.C.
- * Club domestic league appearances and goals

Michael Chabala was a Zambian footballer and coach. Popularly known as ‘Big Mike’as he stood over six-feet tall, he is remembered for scoring a hat-trick against Cameroon in a World Cup qualifier in Lusaka in 1985.

== Playing career ==
Chabala first played as a forward for Zambian Division I side Mufulira Blackpool in 1977, alongside players like Alex Chola, John ‘Fuso’ Lengwe and Simon Kaushi. The following year, he moved to Ndola side Vitafoam United where he would stay for three years, helping to transform the side into a strong team.

Vitafoam won the 1981 Independence Cup with a 2–1 victory over Strike Rovers in October 1981 but Chabala was not part of that success as he had left three months previously to join Nkana Red Devils of Kitwe. He was part of the Devils team that won their first ever league title in 1982 without losing a single match. In his time with Nkana, Chabala won 4 league titles, the Independence Cup and the Champion of Champions trophy.

In 1985, Chabala got a call-up to the national team under Brightwell Banda and he made his debut against Zimbabwe in a friendly match in Bulawayo in February 1985 which Zambia lost 3–2. He scored his first goal for Zambia the following month when Zambia drew with Malawi 2–2 in Lusaka, which was a brilliant free-kick with 5 minutes remaining, to tie the game. After the match, Chabala said of the goal: “It was a great goal. I don’t think that goalkeeper will ever forget it and I don’t know if I will ever score a goal like that again in my life.”

He was called to the national team for a 1986 World Cup qualifier against Cameroon. The shock value was immense when Chabala was named in the starting line-up to face the reigning African champions on 4 April 1985 in Lusaka, as he had only appeared in two friendly matches prior to that crucial match. It turned out to be the most sensational competitive debut in Zambian football when he scored an 11-minute hat-trick to lead Zambia to a famous 4–1 victory. A 1–1 draw in the second leg in Yaoundé saw Zambia through to the next round where they were knocked out by Algeria.

He was in the Zambian team that made a first round exit at CAN 1986, where he once again scored against Cameroon in a 3–2 defeat in Alexandria. His last goal for Zambia came in a 1-0 friendly win over Malawi in Blantyre which also turned out to be his last game.

In 1986, Chabala was 9th in the France Football poll for the African Footballer of the Year which was won by Badou Zaki of Morocco. With the emergence of a young Kenneth Malitoli, Chabala found his opportunities limited so he moved to Zambian Premier League side Kalulushi Modern Stars in 1988 and later coached the team. He also coached Division I North side Chambishi F.C.

Chabala died in Kitwe on 5 November 1995 after an illness.
