= Moses Simwala =

Zambian footballer and coach (1949–1993)

Personal information
- Date of birth: 16 July 1949
- Place of birth: Kitwe, Northern Rhodesia
- Date of death: 19 September 1993 (aged 44)
- Place of death: Kitwe, Zambia
- Position: Midfielder

Senior career*
Years	Team	Apps	(Gls)
1966–1980	Rhokana United		

International career
1969–1980	Zambia	55	(7)

Managerial career
- 1980–1993: Nkana F.C.
- * Club domestic league appearances and goals

Moses Simwala (16 July 1949 – 19 September 1993) was a Zambian footballer and coach. Nicknamed 'the chairman,' Simwala featured for Zambia and Rhokana United (later Nkana Red Devils and now Nkana F.C.) as a right winger, the same club he would go on to coach for over 12 years and become the most successful coach in Zambian club football, winning the league title a record 8 times and 25 trophies in all. He was voted Zambian coach of the year in 1988 and 1989.

== Early life ==
Simwala was born in Kitwe to Katontoka and Belita Jimwala who originated from the North-Western Province of Zambia and settled in the Copperbelt town of Kalulushi, after which the family name changed to Simwala. He was the third born of six sons and three daughters and played with home-made footballs with his friends at Twibukishe open grounds. He went to Wusaklie Primary School in 1959 and later moved to Nkana Primary School from where he was selected to Luanshimba Secondary School in 1966. His favourite subjects were chemistry and health sciences and he completed his secondary school education in 1970.

== Playing career ==
Simwala started playing football for the school team at Luanshimba in 1966, the same year in which he joined Rhokana United. He was encouraged by the support from teammates Freddie Mwila, Stone Chibwe and Henry Kalimukwa who gave him advice and guidance in football. The following year, he was selected to represent Zambia schools alongside players like George Mungwa, Peter M'hango, Richard Stephenson, Gibby Zulu, Edward Musonda, Emmanuel Mwape, Willie Phiri, Poni 'Express' Muyambango and Ackim Musenge.

Simwala was a skilful right winger with pace to burn and in his time at Rokana, he won the Challenge Cup in 1966 and the Heinrich (Chibuku) Cup in 1969, providing the cross for Eric Chekeloko's winner in a 1–0 victory over Mufulira Wanderers in Ndola. Playing alongside Zambian international stars Bernard Chanda and Brighton Sinyangwe, he won the Heinrich (Chibuku) Cup again in 1974. In October 1977, Chanda was suspended by the club for disciplinary reasons and Simwala replaced him as club captain. In December 1980, he decided to call time on his playing career and took up coaching.

== National team ==
Simwala first featured for the Zambia national team in October 1969 against Congolese club Daring Falcons in a three match series for the BAT Independence trophy, while he was still a schoolboy. His full international debut came a year later in a CAN qualifier against Tanzania in Dar es Salaam. His first goal for Zambia was in April 1973 when Zambia beat Ethiopia 4–2 in a World Cup qualifier in Lusaka. Six months later, Simwala was on the score sheet again when Zambia beat Morocco 4–0 in another World Cup qualifier in Lusaka, a match which he rated as one of his most memorable games.

He was a squad member at CAN 1974 where Zambia reached the final only to lose to Zaire after a replay. When Dick Chama retired, Simwala was named captain and he led Zambia to the 1976 East and Central Africa football tournament where they lost the final 2–0 to Uganda. He was part of Zambia's Olympic Games squad at Moscow 1980 and played all three games as Zambia bowed out in the first round. His last game for Zambia came on 12 December 1980 in a 1–1 draw with Kenya during that country's Independence celebrations after which he announced his retirement from football to leave room to young players and took up the coaching job at Rhokana stadium.

== Coaching career ==
In 1980, Simwala was appointed Rhokana United (who were by then renamed Nkana Red Devils) coach under Englishman Jeff Butler. His first success was the 1982 Zambian league title when Nkana finished the season unbeaten in 22 league games. It was the first time the Red Devils had won the league and it would be the first of 8 titles under Simwala.

The Devils retained the title the following year and lost it in 1984 to bitter Kitwe rivals Power Dynamos but made up the following year. With 4 games to go, Simwala was sidelined and replaced by Butler as coach for the remaining 4 league games, after a poor run by the devils and the team responded by beating Power 2–0 at their home ground in the last game of the season and snatched the title by a point.

Simwala bounced back the following season and led Nkana to the 1986 title once again and though Nkana had done well in the league under Simwala, they had had a dismal run in cup competitions. This changed in 1986 when they won the Zambian Cup for the first time ever, beating record cup holders Mufulira Wanderers 3–0. This was also Nkana's first cup success since 1969 and they added the Champion of Champions cup later that year. Simwala was rewarded with a coach of the year nomination but lost out to Roy Mulenga of Division I side ZESCO United, who uttered some unfavourable comments about Simwala when fans questioned his credentials for winning the award.

Nkana followed this up with another league title in 1988 and completely cast aside any doubts as to whether they were the dominant team in Zambian soccer. Also known as the 'Clampers,' playing Nkana at their home ground Nkana Stadium was a daunting undertaking and few teams came away with anything. That year's league title was even more impressive considering that seven senior players were suspended for a reasonable part of the season for refusing to sing the national anthem after losing the Heroes and Unity Cup to Green Buffaloes in a final which was played at Nkana Stadium. They would go on to win the league in 1989 and 1990 and also represented Zambia in continental competitions, often reaching the Africa Club Champions Cup quarter-finals and semi-finals.

In 1990, Simwala attended a 3-month coaching course in Rio de Janeiro in Brazil where he had the opportunity of meeting Pele who lectured the attendees and gave them tips. Later that year, he scored another achievement when he led Nkana to the final of the Africa Club Champions Cup against JS Kabylie of Algeria. After a slender 1–0 defeat in the first leg, Nkana reversed the score line in Lusaka and the game went to penalties. Mordon Malitoli's miss denied Nkana the coveted trophy. In 1992, Simwala was appointed assistant national team coach to Samuel "Zoom" Ndhlovu.

For such a highly successful coach, it was just a matter of time before he was given the opportunity to coach the national team. Simwala was picked to replace Ndhlovu as interim Zambian coach after Zambia lost a World Cup qualifier in Madagascar in December 1992, with Godfrey Chitalu and Alex Chola as his assistants. However, he could not take up the appointment due to sickness and Chitalu became the national coach. This also affected his position at Nkana where he was made Technical Advisor and Ben Bamfuchile took over as coach.

== Controversies ==
Simwala's glory days were not without controversy. In 1981, Rokana came close to their first ever league title and were level on points with Green Buffaloes going into the last game of the season. Buffaloes had won their last league match against 'sister club' Ndola United by a score of 6–0, leaving Rokana with the unenviable task of beating Power Dynamos by 10 goals.

They could only manage a 3–1 win and missed out on their first title on goal difference after both teams tied on 48 points. After the Buffaloes win, Simwala alleged that the match had been fixed as there was no way Ndola could lose by such a wide margin. No action was taken against Simwala though Rokana management disassociated themselves from the comments.

When Mulenga was selected ahead of Simwala by a panel of sports journalists for steering his team to the premier league from Division I he controversially aimed a barb in Simwala's direction when it was suggested that the Nkana trainer would have been a more deserving winner, saying Simwala was assisted in his job by Butler, "I am not a man who is assisted in his job by other people. Therefore it is not a true reflection of his ability as a coach because ZCCM (Nkana's sponsors) puts a black man in front of a white man as a trainer of Nkana Red Devils."

Simwala reacted angrily to the slight and accused Mulenga of being ignorant, "I work independently and my job is to get good results for Nkana. I don't work for (sponsors of the award) Rothmans or that bunch of amateurs who picked Mulenga. Mulenga should not try to downgrade me. I have been in this business for a long time. He should go fishing if he has nothing better to do. I am not interested in personal attacks. We should work together instead of criticizing each other."

The two buried the hatchet when Mulenga apologised, stating that he had not meant to hurt Simwala's feelings; "I am sorry for what I said and apologise most sincerely especially to Simwla and all the soccer fans. I appreciate that Simwala played more football than I did and is very good and popular. Even as a coach, he has been very successful."

When the two teams met in the league a few weeks later, Nkana pulverised ZESCO 4–0. That same year, Simwala had a coaching stint at Swansea in Wales for 6 weeks.

In 1989, Simwala incensed the Referees Association of Zambia (RAZ) with his comments after a league game, when he remarked that his wife would have handled the game better than the referee who was in charge on the day. The RAZ gave a statement a few days later that henceforth, referees would boycott Nkana matches and Mrs. Simwala would officiate all of their games. The ban was enforced and Nkana matches had to be postponed until Simwala and the club apologised for the remarks.

In June 1992, Simwala was again in the headlines and this time he was fined and suspended for the rest of the season for attacking referee Alex Kampinda after a league match against Chambishi Blackburn at Chambishi ground which Nkana won 2–0. Although Simwala denied punching the referee and insisted that he merely touched him in the process of gesticulating, the Football Association of Zambia (FAZ) still found him culpable. Because the referee left the incident out of his match report, his appeal was successfully heard though the referee was carpeted for not reporting the incident.

== Death ==
Simwala first experienced poor health when he was appointed interim national team trainer in January 1993 but was hospitalised at Nkana Mine Hospital as the team went into camp in Kabwe.

On Tuesday 6 January, he was discharged from hospital with doctors advising him to rest for one week to recover but he decided to immediately join the national team although his wife Rhoda pleaded in vain for him to rest and join up the following day. Four days later, he was taken ill again and admitted to Kabwe General Hospital and ruled out of the squad travelling to Tanzania for a crucial World Cup encounter. Chitalu took over as coach and Zambia won the game 3–1.

Simwala spent more time in hospital in Kitwe, was discharged but readmitted after complaining of a persistent cough and general weakness. Nkana management then took the decision to appoint Ben Bamfuchile as coach until such a time when Simwala recovered fully and in the meantime, handed him the role of Technical Advisor.

In September, Nkana travelled to Ghana to defend a one-goal lead against Asante Kotoko in the Africa Club Champions Cup quarter-final but lost 3–0. After the game, the players were informed that Simwala had died at Nkana Mine Hospital earlier in the afternoon.

He was put to rest at Chamboli Cemetery in Kitwe and was survived by a wife and five children. His son Govenda currently plays for Power Dynamos as a right-back.

== Honours ==
=== Club honours ===
- Zambian Challenge Cup: 1966
- Heinrich Cup: 1969 and 1974

=== Coaching Honours ===
- Zambian league title: 1982, 1985, 1983, 1986, 1988, 1989, 1990 and 1992
- Charity Shield: 1982, 1983, 1984, 1985, 1987, 1989, 1990 and 1991
- Zambian Cup (Independence Cup/Mosi Cup): 1986, 1989, 1991 and 1992
- Zambian Challenge Cup (Shell Challenge Cup/BP Challenge Cup/ BP Top Eight Cup): 1992
- Heinrich Cup/Chibuku Cup/Heroes and Unity Cup: 1989, 1990
- Champion of Champions Cup: 1986 and 1992
