= Gibby Mbasela =

Zambian footballer (1962-2000)

Personal information
- Full name: Biggie Mbasela
- Date of birth: 24 October 1962
- Place of birth: Kitwe, Northern Rhodesia
- Date of death: 1 May 2000 (aged 37)
- Place of death: Kitwe, Zambia
- Position: Forward

Senior career*
Years	Team	Apps	(Gls)
1983–1985	Big Coke F.C.		
1986	Kalulushi Modern Stars		
1987	Mufulira Wanderers		
1988–1989	Kalulushi Modern Stars		
1990–1991	Nkana F.C.		
1992–1993	FC Union Berlin	44	(17)
1993–1994	Espérance ST		
1994–1999	Kalulushi Modern Stars		

International career
1986–1997	Zambia	51	(10)
- * Club domestic league appearances and goals

Biggie Mbasela (24 October 1962 – 1 May 2000), better known as Gibby Mbasela was a Zambian footballer who played for Kalulushi Modern Stars, Mufulira Wanderers, Nkana Red Devils, 1. FC Union Berlin of Germany and Tunisian champions Esperance. Renowned for his dribbling skills, Mbasela was voted Zambian Footballer of the Year in 1990.

== Playing career ==
Mbasela was born in Kitwe and after playing youth football and for amateur teams he joined Zambian League Division II side Big Coke in 1983 and moved to Premier League team Kalulushi Modern Stars two years later.

He was one of Stars' leading performers, winning many admirers with his dribbling skills. He earned the nickname "Cool It" due to his tendency to slow down the game and dribble at his own pace, as well as several other nicknames all in attestation to his ball skills – "Dribbling Wizard," "Mupike" meaning 'dribble past him,’ "Bapwishe" meaning 'dribble past them all,’ which he was quite capable of. Early in his career, a newspaper report erroneously gave his first name as Gibby and this was the name he would be known by throughout his career.

At the start of the 1987 season he moved on to a bigger challenge when he signed for Mufulira Wanderers for a transfer fee of K3,000. After an impressive showing as a winger or centre-forward which was rewarded with a Heroes & Unity Cup medal, Mbasela returned to Kalulushi at the end of the season and stayed with Stars for two seasons. He was on the move again but this time to league champions Nkana Red Devils where we would form a deadly partnership with Kenneth "Bubble" Malitoli which helped Nkana win the league championship in 1990. With his distinctive 'table-cut' hairstyle, Mbasela created so many opportunities for his strike partner and also weighed in with a fair number of goals. He was man of the match in the Heroes & Unity Cup final which Nkana won by beating Kabwe Warriors 2–0, scoring the first goal with a glorious strike and setting up the second for Beston Chambeshi. Although Nkana suffered a major disappointment when they lost the Africa Club Champion's Cup to JS Kabylie of Algeria on post-match penalties in Lusaka, Mbasela crowned a fine season with the 1990 top player award. The following season, he won the Charity Shield and the Independence Cup.

After starring for Zambia at CAN 1992, Mbasela was signed by German second division club 1. FC Union Berlin during the German winter break. His first game for Union Berlin was against FC Hertha 03 Zehlendorf on 10 May 1992 which they won 7 – 0. He made an immediate impact scoring 4 goals in his first 5 matches and stayed at Union for 1 1/2 seasons, scoring 17 goals in 44 appearances.

In July 1993 Mbasela was on the move again this time to Tunisian giants Esperance after turning down a number of offers including one from Saudi Arabian club Al Shabab. He stayed at Esperance for a single season and left in June 1994 to return to Kalulushi Modern Stars.

After a serious injury sustained while playing for Zambia in a World Cup qualifier against Zaire in Harare in April 1997, Mbasela was out of action for two seasons but returned for Modern Stars in a league game against Zanaco on 27 June 1999 in Lusaka and lasted the entire 90 minutes and gave a good account of himself on the pitch. He however retired from football at the end of the year.

== National team ==
Mbasela was first called to the National team in 1986 by coach Brightwell Banda and made his debut when Zambia travelled to Malawi for a two-game friendly series in June 1986. He also played in a friendly against Zaire which Zambia lost 1–0 in Lusaka in September of the same year. He was then left out of the team until the following year's CECAFA tournament where Zambia was eliminated in the first round.

He was out of the team for most of 1988, missing out on the Seoul Olympic Games but returned for that year's CECAFA tournament in Malawi, scoring 3 goals in Zambia's run to the final where they lost 3–1 to the hosts after extra-time.

Mbasela scored a goal when Zambia beat Egypt 2–1 in a friendly at Nkana stadium on 20 December 1988 and the following year featured prominently in the 1990 World Cup qualifiers. He was not part of Zambia's bronze medal-winning squad at CAN 1990 in Algeria but he featured in all of Zambia's games after that, and was part of the victorious 1991 CECAFA squad.

At CAN 1992 in Senegal, Mbasela came on as a substitute in Zambia's first game against Egypt, replacing Webby Chikabala in the 60th minute and a minute later set up Kalusha Bwalya with an overhead pass for the only goal of the match. Zambia lost to Ivory Coast in the quarter-finals but Mbasela's performances were enough to earn him a contract with 1. FC Union Berlin of Germany.

Mbasela led Zambia's attack when they beat South Africa 1–0 in Johannesburg in a CAN qualifier in August 1992 but was not part of the team that perished in the Gabon air disaster eight months later. He was a key player in the reconstituted team, making his first appearance in a tough Nations Cup qualifier against Zimbabwe in Harare when he replaced Maybin Mgaiwa in the 35th minute of the match which Zambia came from behind to draw 1-1 through a rare headed goal by Bwalya, which was enough to earn them a place at Tunisia 1994. Not only was Mbasela's performance striking, so was his appearance. With his teammates bedecked in a white Adidas strip, he surprisingly entered the pitch wearing Adidas shorts and a Puma shirt, with the FAZ giving no explanation for the faux pas but it presumably did not go down well with Adidas, who were Zambia's kit sponsors at the time.

He scored Zambia's first goal in a 4–0 rout of Senegal in a World Cup qualifier in Lusaka and was in the team that lost out on World Cup qualification, losing 1–0 to Morocco in Casablanca.

Mbasela was in Zambia's team at CAN 1994 and made a substitute appearance in the 1–0 win over Ivory Coast but was sent home in disgrace for disciplinary reasons, when he refused to sit on the bench after differing with the coaching staff over playing time. Without him Zambia soldiered on and went on to lose the final 2–1 to Nigeria.

He made an ill-fated comeback in another World Cup qualifier against Zaire in Harare in April 1997, but this time, there was no repeat of his heroics of four years ago as the substitute appearance only lasted three minutes and he had to leave the pitch with a compound fracture of the right leg which would keep him out of action for two years. This turned out to be his last game for Zambia. He made 51 appearances for Zambia scoring 10 goals.

== Death ==
In early 2000, Mbasela began experiencing poor health. He was admitted to Kitwe Central Hospital where he died on 1 May 2000. He was buried at Chamboli Cemetery in Kitwe and was survived by a wife Rebecca and four children.

== Honours ==
- Zambian Premier League: 1989, 1990
- Heroes & Unity Cup: 1987, 1989
- Independence Cup: 1989
- Charity Shield: 1989, 1990, 1991

Individual Awards

- Zambian Footballer of the Year: 1990
