= Malitoli =

Malitoli is a surname. Notable people with the surname include:

- Kenneth Malitoli (born 1966), Zambian footballer and manager
- Mordon Malitoli (born 1968), Zambian footballer
