= Richard Stephenson (footballer) =

Zambian footballer (born 1949)

Personal information
- Date of birth: 12 August 1949 (age 77)
- Place of birth: Ndola, Northern Rhodesia
- Height: 5 ft 11 in (1.80 m)
- Position: Midfielder

Senior career*
Years	Team	Apps	(Gls)
1967–1976	Kabwe Warriors		
1976–1977	Raylton United FC		
1978–1981	Power Dynamos		

International career
1968–1976	Zambia		
- * Club domestic league appearances and goals

Richard Stephenson (born 12 August 1949) was one of Zambia's most gifted midfielders who featured during the country's very first Cup of Nations appearance in Egypt in 1974. He captained the 'Magnificent' Kabwe Warriors and was Zambia's footballer of the year in 1971. Stephenson also played for Kitwe giants Power Dynamos later in his career.

== Early life ==
Stephenson was born in Ndola and attended Fatima Convent School in Ndola Rural from 1957 to 1966 where he did his primary and junior secondary education. He got inspired to play football by his teacher Bonnie Williams who was coaching rugby and football at the school. Williams also introduced him to rugby but as a young boy, it did not make sense to him and all he wanted was to kick the ball with his feet. He enjoyed playing football and excelled at the game, becoming the school's team captain.

== Playing career ==
After his junior secondary education, Stephenson transferred to King George VI High School in Kabwe where his history teacher Glyn Peters played a key role in his soccer career. Peters was Stephenson's history teacher and also the Zambia Secondary Schools Association (ZASSA) secretary and he encouraged Stephenson to take his career further.

Stephenson joined Kabwe Warriors in 1967 and made his league bow in a match against Mufulira Blackpool and he won the Castle Cup in his first season. He was chosen to play for the school team which was involved in the Midlands schools league that was dominated by Munali Secondary of Lusaka with King George VI often coming out second though they also won the league title. After the schools league championship, Stephenson was selected by ZASSA to represent Zambia in Malawi in 1967. The team had the likes of George Mungwa, Peter M'hango, Moses Simwala, Gibby Zulu, Edward Musonda, Emmanuel Mwape, Willie Phiri, Poni 'Express' Muyambango and Ackim Musenge, and was coached by John Green who would later become the Zambia national team coach.

Before departure for Malawi, the schools team played a game against the senior national team at Scrivener Stadium in Kitwe and won 4–1. On their Malawian tour, they played 3 matches against various schools and won all of them by wide margins. It was then decided that they should play first division teams and the Zambians won two games and only lost the last one 1–0 against a strong club side Zomba United. Stephenson won the league title with Warriors in 1968, which was the first time in the club's history.

After completing school in 1968, Stephenson concentrated on playing football at Warriors. He was employed by Zambia Railways as an Assistant Statistician and was later named club captain, a task which he carried out with distinction considering that at one point, Warriors contributed no less than seven players to the national team. The level-headed and hard-working midfielder successfully led a star-studded Warriors team and his fine performances for both Warriors and the national team earned him a nomination for the Footballer of the Year award in 1971. Upon his return from Kenya where Zambia lost the Jamhuri cup to the hosts, Stephenson discovered that the shortlist had been pared down further when the organizers decided to remove the names of all those who had faced disciplinary action during the season. This knocked out Dick Chama, Godfrey Chitalu, Dickson Makwaza, Emment Kapengwe and Philip Tembo, and Stephenson won the prestigious award. The elated Stephenson said it was the greatest moment of his career and that he was so proud to have won the award.

He won the league on 4 occasions and playing alongside big names like Chitalu, Boniface Simutowe, Sandy Kaposa, Edward Musonda, Gibby Zulu and Fred Ngulube, and was part of the Warriors team of immortals that swept all the silverware on offer in 1972.

In 1976, he was transferred to Ndola and started playing for Warrior's sister club Raylton United where he was noticed by Arthur Davies, the general manager of the Copperbelt Power Company (CPC), sponsors of Power Dynamos who invited him to join the team. He joined Dynamos in 1978 and was assistant player-coach until 1981 when he retired from active football.

== National team ==
Stephenson's first bit of action with the national team was in May 1968 when Zambia faced visiting English side Leicester City who featured Peter Shilton in goal. His full international debut came a month later on 29 June 1968 when Zambia beat Uganda 2–1 in a Heroes Cup play-off in Lusaka. Stephenson reflected that without playing for Zambia Schools he would not have made it to the national team as players had to go through a thorough selection exercise. As a schoolboy featuring for Zambia he had to miss a 7–1 win against Tanzania in November 1968 in Kitwe as he was writing his school-leaving exams.

He was in the team that was beaten 10–1 by Zaire in 1969, a game in which he sustained a serious injury that kept him out of football for 8 months. His first goal for Zambia came on 1 November 1970 in a CAN qualifier in Lusaka when he scored a brace in a 5–1 demolition of Tanzania.

Zambia faced Zaire in the next round of CAN qualifying in June 1971 in Ndola. Stephenson opened the scoring with a 30-yard shot. After Zaire had equalized, Peter M'hango scored a late winner to secure a 2-1 victory. Defeating the Zaire Leopards was a momentous achievement as it was the first time Zambia had beaten Zaire in a long time and it made them believe that they could take on Africa's top teams and win. However, Zambia lost the return leg 3-0 in Kinshasa, during which Stephenson suffered a knee injury which kept him out for the rest of the season.

When Zambia beat Nigeria 5–1 in Lusaka to qualify to CAN 74 on a 7–4 aggregate, Stephenson was named in the 22-man team that travelled to Egypt for Zambia's first ever CAN adventure where they reached the final only to lose to Zaire after a replay.

He retired from the national team with his last game coming against Tanzania at the CECAFA tournament later that year.

== Personal life ==
Stephenson married Gertrude and they had 8 children together of which five were boys. His life after football has not been like that of most Zambian players who struggle to earn a living after retirement. He left CPC after 18 years and moved back to Ndola where he worked in the Transportation business. After leaving Dynamos, he has not been involved in football that much though he still follows the game. When Zambia needed a win to progress in the CECAFA Cup in 1987 but could only draw against Zimbabwe, a disappointed Stephenson famously came up with the line "It's better to bet against Zambia when they are involved in a crucial tie."

== Honours ==
=== With Kabwe Warriors ===
- Zambian League Title: 1968, 1970, 1971, 1972
- Castle Cup: 1967, 1969 and 1972
- Challenge Cup: 1970, 1972
- Heinrich Cup: 1971, 1972
- Charity Shield: 1969, 1970, 1971, 1972, 1973

=== With Power Dynamos ===
- FAZ Division II title: 1978
- Independence Cup: 1979, 1980

=== National Honours ===
- Heroes Cup:1968 against Uganda
- Uganda Independence Cup: 1968
- Independence Cup: 1968 against Tanzania
- Peter Stuyvesant Trophy:1969 (3 match series with Malawi)
- BAT Independence Trophy: 1969 (3 match series with Daring Falcons of Congo DR)

=== Individual awards ===
- Zambian Footballer of the Year: 1971
