= Godfrey Chitalu =

Zambian footballer (1947–1993)

- Chitalu in 1993

Personal information
- Full name: Godfrey Kangwa Chitalu
- Date of birth: 22 October 1947
- Place of birth: Luanshya, Northern Rhodesia
- Date of death: 27 April 1993 (aged 45)
- Place of death: Atlantic Ocean, off Gabon
- Position: Forward

Youth career
- 1957–1959: Fisansa Youth Club
- 1959–1962: Kwacha I Community Centre

Senior career*
Years	Team	Apps	(Gls)
1964–1970	Kitwe United	200+	(176+)
1971–1982	Kabwe Warriors	500+	(314+)
Total		700+	(490+)

International career
1968–1980	Zambia	111	(79)

Managerial career
- 1984–1986: Kabwe Warriors
- 1991–1993: Kabwe Warriors
- 1993: Zambia
Medal record
Men's football
Representing Zambia
Africa Cup of Nations
Runner-up	1974 Egypt
- * Club domestic league appearances and goals

Godfrey Chitalu (22 October 1947 – 27 April 1993), nicknamed Ucar, was a Zambian footballer who played as a forward. He is widely regarded as the greatest Zambian player of all time as he holds his national team's goalscoring record and was voted Zambian footballer of the year five times. In 2006, he was selected by CAF as one of the best 200 African footballers of the past 50 years. Chitalu is the all-time African men's top goal scorer in international football with 79 goals.

The Football Association of Zambia claimed that Chitalu scored more than 100 goals in all competitions in 1972, more than Gerd Müller's total in the same year and Lionel Messi's total in 2012, both of which are often referred to by journalist as "world records". The research was presented in the year 2012 after Messi broke the alleged world record of Müller. Nevertheless, a FIFA spokesman declared that an official FIFA world record had never existed as they did not keep track of domestic competitions.

Upon retirement, Chitalu took to coaching and was in charge of the Zambia national team when the entire squad perished in a plane crash off the coast of Gabon on 27 April 1993.

== Early life ==
Godfrey Kangwa Chitalu was born in Luanshya, on the Copperbelt Province, where his father Lucian Chitalu worked as a miner and also served as a Local Court Justice, while his mother Emeriah Chitalu was a housewife. He grew up in Section 9 of Roan Mine Township with 9 siblings, Godfrey was the seventh to be born. This is also where he played youth football barefoot, on the streets of the township as well as the numerous community grounds. Matches would take place between the different sections of the mine township. Buttons would be the main prize for winners, but instead, on some occasions money would be the price. This is where some games would end in fistfights, between the opposing teams. Chitalu loved playing football, but the rough nature of the games meant that he suffered from many injuries. Some of these injuries would include a broken arm, which would be broken more times in the future. At times, when he was in hospital, he would escape and go and play football with his friends.

He began his formal education at Makoma Primary School in 1954 and managed to get a place in the school team at the age of 10. Shortly afterwards, he was surprised when the Recreation Officer, Bennie Evans, invited him to Fisansa Youth Club for a trial after which he started playing for the team as a centre-forward. He passed this trial and joined several other young talents, including another Zambian international, Willie Chifita. The youth club would often compete in the small league for boys in the town which was formed by Bennie Evans. At one point the league had 99 affiliated teams. Fisansa were often pitted against other youth clubs in Luanshya. This is how Godfrey came across Boniface Simutowe, an all-round midfielder who was a great attacking threat and even played in goal on some occasions. Names such as Sandy Kaposa, Happy Malama, Dyson Mugala, Kenny Bnda and Henry Kasongo. Even though competition was stiff, Chitalu got into the under-15 district team, and travelled to Bulawayo with the squad in 1958 as a reserve player and also took part in boxing.

In 1959 he got a transfer to Kawama School in Kitwe where he switched his position to inside-left and became a regular first team player. While at Kawama School, he joined the Kwacha I Community Centre team where he played at centre-forward. This is where he met future Kitwe United teammates Lameck Soko, Stephen Musonda and Winston Muamba. During his 3 years at the centre, Kwacha I remained champions in Kitwe District. Chitalu's talent was noticed by a club trainer called Tirivavi, who encouraged him to concentrate on playing football and forget about boxing so he hung up his gloves conditioned too by the fact that not many boys of his age were interested in the sport.

In 1961, he completed his primary education and left Kitwe. He went to stay with his elder brother Stanley in Chingola and continued his studies at Mushishima Secondary School and played for the school team at inside-left. He was forced to drop out of school in 1964 four months before his junior secondary school examinations when Stanley lost his job and with no one to pay his school fees, he returned to Kitwe and Kwacha I.

Kitwe United United captain and Zambian international Emment Kapengwe watched him play for Kwacha I and advised him to try out for a Division I team, where he was sure Chitalu would make the grade so he ended up joining Kitwe's reserves upon being invited by club chairman Jethro Ngwane who was looking for young talent for his team.

== Club career ==
=== Kitwe United ===
Late in 1964, Chitalu came to the attention of Zambian National Football League Division 1 side Kitwe United. Their chairman, Jethro Ngwane, was on the lookout for young, promising players for his team. During one of his many trips, to watch community matches, Jehtro spotted Godfrey, who had a great eye for goal and he sensed that he had a great eye for goal. Jethro invited him to Buchi Stadium, where joined the reserve team.

In 1965 Chitalu spent most of the season in the reserves and was promoted to the first team at the end of the season. It wasn't until October 1965, in the final game of the season, he broke into the first team. He was 17 at this point. He scored in a 2–1 victory against Rhokana United as they finished 3rd in the league.

In 1966 now wearing the number 10 shirt for Kitwe United, cemented his place in the side and was one of its leading scorers, with 14 goals, although the team could only manage a sixth-place finish. Although Chitalu played regularly, his future was still undecided. It was Kitwe United's skipper and Zambian star, Emment Kapengwe, who encouraged Chitalu to take football seriously. The strong and aggressive teenager, who admired the Scottish striker Denis Law, showed plenty of skill but also had a reputation for being temperamental and rough. In his own words, "he could not stand being booted without retaliation". Chitalu made it to the final of the Challenge Cup with Kitwe United but lost 5–1 to Rhokana United. In this season he scored around 14 goals.

In June 1967, Zambia played three exhibition matches against the touring John Charles XI and Chitalu's performances in the matches caught the attention of Cardiff City but the anticipated offer of a contract did not materialise. On 8 July 1967, he made the headlines for the wrong reasons when he was sent off in a league match against City of Lusaka at Woodlands Stadium in Lusaka. After being warned several times for rough play, he was finally booked by the referee but Chitalu gave his name as Denis Law and this earned him a sending off. He refused to leave the pitch and had to be escorted off by a Kitwe United official. As he was already on a warning for bad behaviour, the disciplinary committee of the Zambian NFL came down hard on him and suspended him for the rest of the season for giving the referee a false name. He only scored around 8 goals this season, but his next season would have been one of best he's done.

In 1968, Chitalu was named club captain, a move which the media described as "the best move ever made – or the worst". at 20, this made him the youngest captain in Division I and the club felt that by being named captain, he would be forced to control himself so that he could control his players. Chitalu responded that it was a bit tricky for him but he was ready for the challenge and did not want to let the team down. He said each time he had committed an offence in the past, he used to question the referee but Kitwe United officials had been responsible for changing his character. At the start of the season, Chitalu scored 18 goals in 9 league and cup matches.As Chitalu's disciplinary record improved, so did his goal scoring ability as he scored 70 goals for club and 11 for his country to win the inaugural Footballer of the Year and Top Scorer awards. Despite this, he only came 4th in the league with Kitwe United. Kitwe United even reached the final of the Castle Cup which they lost to league champions Mufulira Wanderers 2–1.

In June 1969, Chitalu was in trouble with the authorities yet again when he was fined and suspended for six weeks after being sent off in an exhibition game between Zambia and Cardiff City, for hacking Cardiff defender Brian Harris.The ban was later lifted by the Football Association of Zambia after an apology. Also, in May, he picked up a yellow card during a match against Rhokana. After the game, he punched Rhokana's chairman, Richard Mulenga, but Chitalu later escaped punishment from the NFL. He was suspended for six months for leaving the national team's training camp without permission, despite his explanation that he was unwell and had gone to seek treatment from his doctor in Luanshya. Despite this, Chitalu scored 45 goals for club and country.

Chitalu returned to action in the year 1970 after serving five months and missing the first month of league games. He managed to stay out of trouble and won the Chibuku Cup with Kitwe United in a 1–0 victory over Kabwe Warriors in Kitwe. At the end of the season, he picked up his second Footballer of the Year award and finished third on the top scorers list behind leading scorer Sandy Kaposa and runner-up Boniface Simutowe, as Chitalu got 41 goals.

=== Kabwe Warriors ===
In 1971, Chitalu moved to Kabwe with the intention of joining Kabwe Warriors. At first, Kitwe United tried to pour water on the move by saying they would not release him as Warriors had "caught a fish in the wrong waters". Kitwe United then slapped a transfer fee of K15,000 which was more than seven times the record fee in Zambian football of K2,000. Chitalu appealed to the National Football League and the transfer was eventually given the green light at a reduced fee of K3,500.

After missing the first six games of the season, Chitalu scored a hat-trick in his first game, against Kalulushi Modern Stars. It was in this year that he started going by the nickname "Ucar" after the long lasting Ucar batteries manufactured by Union Carbide. He won the league and Chibuku Cup double in his first season at Kabwe Warriors and ended the year as top scorer with 51 goals for club and country.

Chitalu kicked off the 1972 season by scoring a brace when Kabwe Warriors drew 2–2 with Majantja FC in Maseru in the African Cup of Champions Clubs on 23 January 1972. He followed this up with a lesson in clinical finishing, scoring seven goals when Kabwe Warriors overwhelmed the Sothos 9–0 in the second leg on 6 February 1972 at Dag Hammarskjöld Stadium in Ndola. Although the newspaper reports of the match stated that he had set the pace on the scoring charts with nine goals in the competition, the goals were later scratched off by the Zambian authorities because the two matches were played before the Zambian season had gotten underway.

Chitalu scored the winner when Kabwe Warriors beat Kitwe United 1–0 to win the season-opening Charity Shield and scored twice when Kabwe Warriors trounced Zambia Police 5–2 in their first league game of the season at Railways Stadium in Kabwe. He scored a hat-trick when Kabwe Warriors beat Maseru United 7–1 in an international friendly at the same venue in March and 4 goals in a 14–2 thrashing of Norco Rangers in a Chibuku Cup first round match to pull away from the rest of the field. He was also on target for Zambia in an international friendly against Sheffield United in May.

When Zambia met Lesotho in a FIFA World Cup qualification game in June, he struck twice in a 6–1 victory and was also on the score-sheet in friendly matches against Union Española of Chile. Chitalu scored a brace when he captained the All Stars to a 4–3 victory against The Rest on 14 August, taking him to 71 goals for the season. Chitalu scored twice in the Zambian Challenge Cup final when Kabwe Warriors beat Ndola United 3–1 and scored in another final two weeks later, this time in the 5–3 defeat of Rhokana United in the Chibuku Cup final. In the process, he surpassed his own record of 81 goals that he had set as the inaugural winner of the Top Scorer awards back in 1968.

At the end of October, Chitalu had amassed 92 goals with a gap of 57 goals between him and second placed Bernard Chanda of Mufulira Wanderers and his teammate Sandy Kaposa. He went on to score in 17 consecutive matches for Kabwe Warriors, including two when they were knocked out of the African Cup of Champions Clubs 9–3 on aggregate by Ghana's Hearts of Oak, 5 against Buseko FC in a Chibuku Cup tie, 5 against Roan in a Castle Cup semi-final and 7 against Mufulira Wanderers in two league games including 4 in a 5–1 demolition at Shinde Stadium.

He scored in yet another cup final when Kabwe Warriors crushed his old club Kitwe United 6–1 in November to lift the Castle Cup, with Chitalu grabbing a hat-trick and taking his tally for the season to 99 goals in a 9–2 whipping of City of Lusaka and only needed one more to reach the magical figure of one hundred goals. The hundredth goal soon came in a 4–2 victory in a league game against Kalulushi Modern Stars at the Independence Stadium in Kalulushi, when he scored a hat-trick.

At the end of the season Kabwe Warriors had swept all the silverware on offer, a haul which included the Footballer of the Year and Top scorer awards for Chitalu who attributed his success to the good support of his teammates. For his remarkable achievement, Chitalu received a special yellow ball from sponsors Rothmans International which had his name and number of goals inscribed on it.

He tied for top scorer with Bernard Chanda in the 1973 season, and led the scoring charts as well in 1974. In 1975, he played in a deeper midfield role and recorded his worst tally of goals, scoring less than 10 league goals and Kabwe Warriors ended the season second bottom with 6 wins, 7 draws and 13 defeats and were relegated from the top league. They were however saved when the Football Association of Zambia decided to increase the number of teams in the Zambian Premier League from 14 to 16.

Chitalu was runner-up to Bernard Chanda in the 1976 scoring duel, finishing with 31 goals which was seven less than "the Bomber's". He lost out to surprise winner Vincent Chileshe for the 1977 Footballer of the Year award but was named the country's Sportsman of the Year. He became the first man to win the Zambian Footballer of the Year award in consecutive seasons in 1978 and 1979. In July 1981, Chitalu broke his arm when Kabwe Warriors beat City of Lusaka 2–1 in a league game in Lusaka when he jumped over a defender's tackle and landed badly. The injury kept him out for the rest of the season. He made a comeback the following year after which he retired from the game at the end of the season.

== Goal record challenge ==
After Lionel Messi was recorded to have beaten Gerd Müller's record of 85 goals in a year, the Football Association of Zambia claimed that the world record actually pertained to Chitalu who had scored 116 goals (possibly 117) during the 1972 calendar year and 107 during the 1972 season. The difference of goals is due to first 9 goals being scored before the season officially started. The Football Association of Zambia presented the evidence to FIFA but a spokesperson responded that they would ratify neither Messi's nor Chitalu's records as they do not keep statistical track of domestic competitions. Nonetheless, it could constitute the highest official tally claimed by a national football association.

Summary of the record
Competition	Games	Goals
African Cup of Champions Clubs	13	4
Castle Cup	15	15
Challenge Cup	10	10
Charity Shield	1	1
Chibuku Cup	16	16
Friendly	5	5
League	49	49
NFL Benevolent Fund Match	2	2
NFL Trophy	3	3
World Cup qualification	2	2
Total	116	107

List of goals scored throughout both 1972 calendar year and season
Competition	Team	Opponent	Result	Goals	Note
African Cup of Champions Clubs	Kabwe Warriors	Matjantja	2–2	2	A
African Cup of Champions Clubs	Kabwe Warriors	Matjantja	9–0	7	A
African Cup of Champions Clubs	Kabwe Warriors	St. Michaels	3–1	1	
African Cup of Champions Clubs	Kabwe Warriors	St. Michaels	3–0	1	
African Cup of Champions Clubs	Kabwe Warriors	Hearts of Oak	2–7	1	
African Cup of Champions Clubs	Kabwe Warriors	Hearts of Oak	1–2	1	
Castle Cup	Kabwe Warriors	Zambia Air Force	12–2	3	
Castle Cup	Kabwe Warriors	Rhokana United	5–3	2	
Castle Cup	Kabwe Warriors	Mufulira Wanderers	3–2	2	
Castle Cup	Kabwe Warriors	Roan United	6–1	5	
Castle Cup	Kabwe Warriors	Kitwe United	6–1	3	
Challenge Cup	Kabwe Warriors	Rothmans	10–0	3	
Challenge Cup	Kabwe Warriors	Kalulushi Modern Stars	7–3	2	
Challenge Cup	Kabwe Warriors	Butondo Western Tigers	10–0	2	
Challenge Cup	Kabwe Warriors	Zambia Eagles	3–0	1	
Challenge Cup	Kabwe Warriors	Ndola United	3–1	2	
Charity Shield	Kabwe Warriors	Kitwe United	1–0	1	
Chibuku Cup	Kabwe Warriors	Norco Rangers	14–2	3	
Chibuku Cup	Kabwe Warriors	Butondo Western Tigers	6–1	3	
Chibuku Cup	Kabwe Warriors	Buseko FC	10–2	5	
Chibuku Cup	Kabwe Warriors	Roan United	3–2	1	
Chibuku Cup	Kabwe Warriors	Rhokana United	5–3	4	
Friendly	Kabwe Warriors	Maseru United	7–1	3	
Friendly	Zambia	Sheffield United	1–1	1	
Friendly	Kabwe Warriors	Union Española	1–1	1	
League	Kabwe Warriors	Zambia Police	5–2	2	
League	Kabwe Warriors	Lusaka Tigers	4–0	1	
League	Kabwe Warriors	Nchanga Rangers	2–1	2	
League	Kabwe Warriors	City of Lusaka	3–0	1	
League	Kabwe Warriors	Butondo Western Tigers	3–2	2	
League	Kabwe Warriors	Ndola United	3–1	2	
League	Kabwe Warriors	Kalulushi Modern Stars	12–3	6	
League	Kabwe Warriors	Zambia Police	7–1	4	
League	Kabwe Warriors	Rhokana United	1–4	1	
League	Kabwe Warriors	Lusaka Tigers	6–1	3	
League	Kabwe Warriors	Butondo Western Tigers	5–0	4	
League	Kabwe Warriors	Nchanga Rangers	1–1	1	
League	Kabwe Warriors	Mufulira Wanderers	5–1	4	
League	Kabwe Warriors	Ndola United	2–2	1	
League	Kabwe Warriors	Roan United	4–1	3	
League	Kabwe Warriors	Mufulira Wanderers	7–1	3	
League	Kabwe Warriors	City of Lusaka	9–2	4	
League	Kabwe Warriors	Kalulushi Modern Stars	4–2	3	
League	Kabwe Warriors	Kitwe United	4–0	2	
NFL Benevolent Fund Match	All Stars	The Rest	4–3	2	
NFL Trophy	Midlands XI	Copperbelt XI	2–5	1	
NFL Trophy	Midlands XI	Copperbelt XI	5–3	2	
World Cup qualification	Zambia	Lesotho	6–1	2	

== International career ==
Chitalu made his international debut on 29 June 1968 in a friendly match against Uganda in Lusaka which Zambia won 2–1. He scored his first goal in a 2–2 draw against the same team five days later.

Chitalu played a prominent role during the World Cup qualification matches against Sudan with Zambia being eliminated on a strange rule which was peculiar to Africa and favoured the team that won the second leg. Despite the aggregate score being tied at 6–6 after Zambia won the first leg 4–2 and lost the return leg by the same margin, Sudan advanced to the Second Round as they scored more goals in the second match. Planned protests led to nothing as FIFA explained:

“Qualifying matches in Africa are governed by special rules and these state that if at the end of full time in the second leg the teams are equal on aggregate, 30 minutes of extra-time will be played. If at the end of extra-time, the aggregate score is still equal, then the team scoring the most goals in the second leg will be declared winner.”

Chitalu was in the team that beat Nigeria 5–1 on 15 July 1973 in Lusaka to qualify to the 1974 African Cup of Nations. He featured for Zambia at the tournament and scored a goal against Egypt in a 3–1 loss. Zambia reached the final which they lost to Zaire after a replay.

In April 1975, he was dropped from the national team and he watched the action from the sidelines for almost two years. He made a comeback when Zambia coach Brightwell Banda took charge of the team, coming off the bench to score two goals in a crucial World Cup qualification tie against Uganda on 27 February 1977 in a 4–2 victory in Ndola.

He repeated the feat five months later in an Africa Cup of Nations qualification game against Algeria with Zambia trailing 2–0 from the first leg in Algiers. He scored a brilliant brace to force a 2–2 draw and Zambia prevailed 6–5 on penalties. In the month when he turned 30, Chitalu scored five goals in the CECAFA Cup which Zambia lost in the final to Uganda on spot-kicks.

The following year, Chitalu graced his second Africa Cup of Nations at Ghana 1978 but Zambia lost him to injury in the first game and were eliminated in the first round of the tournament. He made another impression at the CECAFA Cup in Uganda where he finished top scorer with a record 11 goals, including 3 in a 9–0 thrashing of Kenya and 4 in a 4–0 defeat of Uganda. Zambia however lost to Malawi 3–2 in the final.

In 1980, he represented Zambia at the 1980 Summer Olympics, scoring a goal against the Soviet Union in a 3–1 defeat. He also scored when Zambia lost to Venezuela 2–1 He played his last game for Zambia on 12 December 1980 against Kenya in Nairobi which Zambia lost 2–1. It was his 108th appearance making him Zambia's most capped outfield player and record top scorer with 76 goals.

On 25 May 1981, Chitalu was bestowed with the Insignia of Honour by Zambian President Kenneth Kaunda for his contribution to Zambian football. Afterwards, he said,

"Zambia will bring home the World Cup one day or at least a continental one. But we must accept that these things might take a life-time. However, it is worth the wait."

== Coaching career ==
Chitalu got involved in coaching as early as 1975, when he served as assistant player-coach at Kabwe Warriors. In 1978, he was named interim national team coach for a two-match trip to Swaziland which Zambia comfortably won 6–1 and 5–2.

After retirement, he was appointed assistant coach at Kabwe Warriors under Ilija Lukić. On 16 October 1983, Kabwe Warriors were trailing to Nkana Red Devils in a league match at Railways Stadium. According to reports, Lukić was first sent to the stands, and Nkana were later awarded a penalty in the 75th minute of the match. In the ensuing confusion, Chitalu rushed onto the field as if to talk to the referee and suddenly punched him in the face. This led to the game being abandoned. The club acted swiftly by removing Chitalu from his post and banning him from football activities for a year. Although he denied attacking the referee, the Football Association of Zambia meted out an even heavier punishment when they banned him for life and Kabwe Warriors were fined and docked points for the abandonment of the game.

It seemed like an ignominious end for the famed goal-king but his club mounted an appeal and the life ban was lifted and replaced by a two-year probation period and a fine. The FAZ stated that "in view of Chitalu's outstanding contribution to the Zambian game," he was being given another chance.

Later that year in October, Warriors dismissed veteran coach Lasky Mwandu and appointed Chitalu in his place and Warriors won the Independence Cup. After a seventh-place finish in the 1985 season, he led Warriors to third place in the league in 1986 but was surprisingly replaced by Bizwell Phiri who went on to win the 1987 league title.

In October 1987, he was appointed Administrative Manager for the national team and the following year, Zambia qualified to the 1988 Seoul Olympic Games after a nerve-wracking 2–1 aggregate win over Ghana. After winning the first leg 2–0 in Lusaka and Ghanaian fans predicting a 5–0 whitewash in favour of their team in the return leg, Zambia conceded an early goal in Accra and despite intense Ghanaian pressure, held on to proceed to Seoul.

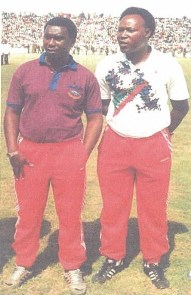
Chitalu with Alex Chola in Lusaka in 1993

Chitalu called the 5 minutes added time 'the longest five minutes of his life.' Although he was left out of the Seoul contingent which made an impression with 4–0 victories over Guatemala and Italy, he bounced back in the same position after the tournament. Later that year, Chitalu received an honorary diploma for Fair Play from the International Fair Play Committee at the awards ceremony on 3 November 1988 in Paris, after he came out second to Indian tennis star Vijay Amritraj in a poll to honour some of the world's most outstanding sports personalities.

In 1990, disaster struck when Kabwe Warriors were relegated and coach Jack Chanda was fired. The club called on Chitalu to lead them back to the top league and he obliged by first ensuring that none of the club's top players left to join other clubs. Kabwe Warriors set a blistering pace in Division I which led to a swift return to the Zambian Premier League. They also won the Challenge Cup after a resounding 7–0 defeat of Konkola Blades and the Champion of Champions Trophy through a 2–1 win over Nkana Red Devils. Eyebrows were raised when Chitalu, the coach of a team in a lower division was rewarded with the Coach of the Year trophy, ahead of Freddie Mwila of Power Dynamos who had won the Zambian Premier League and African Cup Winners' Cup double.

Following Zambia's surprise defeat to Madagascar in a World Cup qualification tie in Antananarivo in December 1992, coach Samuel Ndhlovu was sacked and Moses Simwala was named the new Zambia national team coach with Chitalu and Alex Chola as his assistants. However, Simwala fell ill before he could take charge of the team and Chitalu was appointed head coach. Zambia were tipped to make it all the way to the 1994 World Cup, but on their way to Senegal the team met its fate in the horrific plane crash off the coast of Gabon. Chitalu had a record of 4 wins, a draw and 1 loss with 13 goals scored and 3 conceded.

== Personal life ==
Chitalu married Christine Chibale in October 1972, in between two matches against Ghana's Hearts of Oak in the African Cup of Champions Clubs. They had eight children and his son Dennis also played for Kabwe Warriors in 1992.

== Death ==
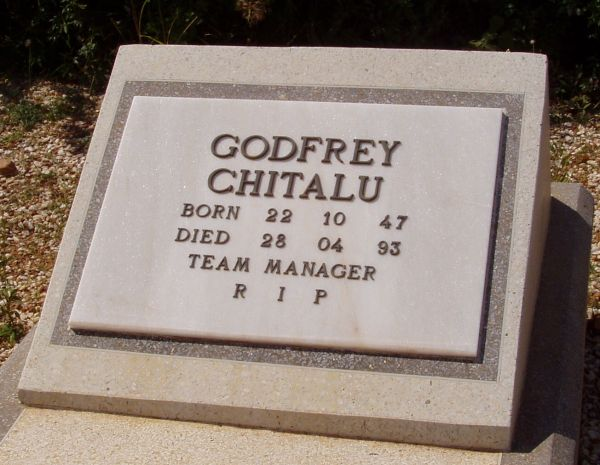
Godfrey Chitalu's grave in Lusaka.

On 27 April 1993, the Zambia national team was travelling to Senegal for the first of their 1994 FIFA World Cup qualification games in the group stage. The team's mode of transportation was a Zambian Air Force plane. After refuelling in Libreville, Gabon, the plane developed problems and plunged into the sea. Thirty people on board including Michael Mwape, the president of the Football Association of Zambia, Chitalu and eighteen players died in the accident.

== Legacy ==
Godfrey Chitalu Road in Lusaka is named after Chitalu. In December 2012, Kabwe Warriors renamed the Railways Stadium as the "Godfrey Chitalu Stadium," and announced plans to erect a statue in his honour. In May 2026, a toll gate on the T2 road (Great North Road) between Kabwe and Kapiri Mposhi was renamed from Manyumbi Toll Plaza to Godfrey Ucar Chitalu Toll Plaza.

== Career statistics ==
=== Club ===
Appearances and goals by club, season, and competition. Only official games are included in this table.
Club	Season	League		Independence Cup		Challenge Cup		Other		Total	
Club	Season	Apps	Goals	Apps	Goals	Apps	Goals	Apps	Goals	Apps	Goals
Kitwe United	1965	1	1	0	0	0	0	0	0	1	1
Kitwe United	1966	16	9	0	0	0	0	0	0	16	9
Kitwe United	1967	4	7	0	0	0	0	0	0	4	7
Kitwe United	1968	18	34	0	0	0	0	0	0	18	34
Kitwe United	1969	11	20	0	0	0	0	0	0	11	20
Kitwe United	1970	13	16	0	0	0	0	0	0	13	16
Kabwe Warriors	1971	12	18	0	0	0	0	0	0	12	18
Kabwe Warriors	1972	27	49	5	15	4	8	12	30	48	102
Kabwe Warriors	1973	11	10	0	0	0	0	0	0	11	10
Kabwe Warriors	1974	20	23	0	0	0	0	0	0	20	23
Kabwe Warriors	1975	2	2	0	0	0	0	0	0	2	2
Kabwe Warriors	1976	13	8	0	0	0	0	0	0	13	8
Kabwe Warriors	1977	5	1	0	0	0	0	0	0	5	1
Kabwe Warriors	1978	11	4	0	0	0	0	1	2	12	6
Kabwe Warriors	1979	10	17	0	0	0	0	0	0	10	17
Kabwe Warriors	1980	13	9	0	0	3	6	0	0	16	15
Kabwe Warriors	1981	4	1	0	0	1	1	5	4	11	6
Kabwe Warriors	1982	6	1	0	0	0	0	0	0	6	1
Kabwe Warriors	Total	197+	230+	5+	15+	8+	15+	18+	36+	228+	296+

=== International ===
Goals by national team and year
National team	Year	Goals
Zambia	1968	12
Zambia	1969	3
Zambia	1970	1
Zambia	1971	9
Zambia	1972	2
Zambia	1973	4
Zambia	1974	1
Zambia	1977	11
Zambia	1978	17
Zambia	1979	7
Zambia	1980	12
Total		79

== Honours ==
=== Player ===
Kabwe Warriors

- Zambian Premier League: 1971, 1972
- Castle Cup: 1972
- Challenge Cup: 1972
- Heinrich Chibuku Cup: 1970, 1971, 1972
- Charity Shield: 1971, 1972, 1973

Zambia

- Heroes Cup (3 match series against Uganda): 1968
- Peter Stuyvesant Trophy (3 match series against Malawi): 1969
- African Cup of Nations runner up: 1974

Individual

- Zambian Footballer of the Year: 1968, 1970, 1972, 1978, 1979
- Zambian League Top Scorer: 1968, 1971, 1972, 1974, 1977, 1980
- Zambian Sportsman of the Year: 1977
- CECAFA Cup top scorer: 1978
- Zambian Insignia of Honour: 1981
- Fair Play Award from the International Fair Play Committee: 1988

=== Manager ===
Kabwe Warriors

- Independence Cup: 1984
- Zambian Division I League: 1991
- Challenge Cup: 1991
- Champion of Champions Cup: 1991
- Charity Shield: 1992

=== Records ===
Data presented by the Football Association of Zambia regarding the 1972 calendar year and the 1972 season suggests Chitalu could be holder of world records such as most official goals in a year and most official goals in a season.

Alternatively Spanish historian Guillem Pons claim that at most 88 of those goals could be official. Pons amongst others excluded goals scored in the Charity Shield and the Chibuku Cup, indirectly basing his assumptions on the fact that the website of the Zambian FA makes no direct reference to these tournaments. However, the Charity Shield is currently a tournament administered by the Football Association of Zambia as a season-opening trophy, similar to the English FA Community Shield.

Zambian historian Jerry Muchimba responded to these claims with news clippings, additionally attesting that: "The Castle Cup, Challenge Cup and Chibuku Cup were all official knock-out cup competitions and had been in existence from the time the league started. The Charity Shield was introduced in 1967 and is still in existence today though it is now called the Samuel “Zoom” Ndhlovu Charity Shield, after another iconic footballer."

== See also ==
- List of top international men's football goalscorers by country
- List of men's footballers with 100 or more international caps
- List of men's footballers with 50 or more international goals
