= Jericho Shinde =

Zambian footballer and coach (born 1959)

Personal information
- Date of birth: 20 December 1959 (age 66)
- Place of birth: Kitwe, Northern Rhodesia
- Position: Midfielder

Youth career
- 1974–1977: Rhokana United

Senior career*
Years	Team	Apps	(Gls)
1977–1988	Nkana FC		

International career
1981–1987	Zambia		

Managerial career
- 1993–1995: Kalulushi Modern Stars
- 1996–1997: Botswana Defence Force
- 1997–1998: Kabwe Warriors
- 1999–2001: Kalulushi Modern Stars
- 2002: Nkana F.C.
- 2003–2005: Afrisport
- 2005: Nkana F.C.
- 2007–2008: Zanama FC
- 2009: TAFIC F.C.
- 2011–2012: Chamboli Academy
- 2014: Chimwemwe Chiefs
- * Club domestic league appearances and goals

Jericho Shinde is a Zambian football coach and former football midfielder, nicknamed "Russian Tank." He was a player for the Nkana Red Devils (now named Nkana F.C.). Shinde won four league titles and was also a midfielder for the Zambia national football team in the 1980s. After retirement, Shinde coached for Nkana, the Kalulushi Modern Stars and the Power Dynamos.

== Playing career ==
Shinde was still a student at Kitwe's Chamboli Secondary School when he made his debut for Rhokana as a 17-year-old in 1977. He started his career by playing on the left side of midfield, but transitioned to a central midfielder later in his career. He made his international debut in August 1981 at the age of 21 in a CAN qualifier against Morocco in Rabat, when he replaced the injured Alex Chola in a match which Zambia lost 2–1. His team won the return leg 2–0 to qualify for CAN 82. By this time, Shinde was playing in a central midfield position and though he was a deep-lying midfielder for the national team, he assumed a more attacking role for his club, wearing the number 10 shirt for the Red Devils. He was part of Zambia's team at CAN 1982 and was the star performer as Rhokana (now rechristened Nkana Red Devils) won the inaugural Premier League title in 1982 without losing a single game, and three more titles in 1983, 1985 and 1986. He was part of Zambia's CECAFA winning team in December 1984 in Uganda, scoring a goal against Tanzania in the group stage.

Shinde was at his best when Zambia defeated Cameroon 4–1 in a World Cup qualifier in 1985 in Lusaka, bossing the midfield to telling effect. He was in the team that defeated Nigeria 1–0 on aggregate to qualify to CAN 1986 and he featured at the tournament where Zambia did not make it past the group stage. He played his last game for Zambia against Malawi in an All Africa Games Qualifier in April 1987. In his last game for the Zambia national team, he suffered a knee injury that ended his playing career prematurely.

== Coaching career ==
He took up coaching in the early 1990s: first at Nkana as one of the assistants under Moses Simwala; after which, he coached another Zambian Premier League side Kalulushi Modern Stars. Shinde then moved to Nkana's bitter rivals, defending league champions Power Dynamos in 1995, replacing Webby Chilufya who had left for a coaching course in Europe.

When Power Dynamos recorded some indifferent results in the league, Shinde had a traumatic experience when fans blamed him for the team's performances and one of them went as far as following him to his home and pulling a gun on him.

When Power Dynamos surrendered their title to Mufulira Wanderers at the end of the season, Shinde was dismissed and Chilufya reassumed coaching duties and declared that if he had been in charge throughout the season, Dynamos would not have lost the league. Shinde gave no response until a year later when Chilufya was fired at the end of the 1996 season when Dynamos finished third, 19 points behind champions Wanderers. He had the last word, saying that he hoped Chilufya had learnt a lesson, that there were ups and downs in the coaching job.

Shinde later coached Nkana, Afrisport FC and Botswana side TAFIC F.C. He is currently coaching Nkana's feeder team, Young Nkana.
