= List of international goals scored by Godfrey Chitalu =

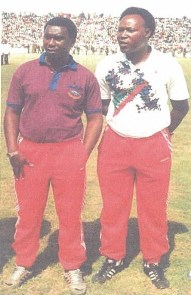
Chitalu (right) with his Zambian teammate Alex Chola

Godfrey Chitalu was a Zambian professional footballer who represented the Zambia national team at international level from 1968 to 1980. During that time, he amassed 111 caps and scored 79 international goals, making him the all-time record goalscorer for the Zambia national team, highest international goalscorer from an African nation, and joint twelfth-highest international goalscorer in history.

== International goals ==
Scores and results list Zambia's goal tally first, score column indicates score after each Chitalu goal.

List of international goals scored by Godfrey Chitalu
No.	Date	Venue	Opponent	Score	Result	Competition
1	4 July 1968	Scrivener Stadium, Kitwe, Zambia	Uganda	1–2	2–2	Friendly
2	4 July 1968	Scrivener Stadium, Kitwe, Zambia	Uganda	2–2	2–2	Friendly
3	9 October 1968	Nakivubo Stadium, Kampala, Uganda	Uganda	1–0	3–2	Uganda Independence Tournament
4	13 October 1968	Jogoo Road Stadium, Nairobi, Kenya	Kenya	1–1	1–2	Friendly
5	22 October 1968	Scrivener Stadium, Kitwe, Zambia	Tanzania	2–0	7–1	Friendly
6	22 October 1968	Scrivener Stadium, Kitwe, Zambia	Tanzania	3–0	7–1	Friendly
7	22 October 1968	Scrivener Stadium, Kitwe, Zambia	Tanzania	4–1	7–1	Friendly
8	27 October 1968	Dag Hammarskjöld Stadium, Ndola, Zambia	Sudan	2–2	4–2	1970 FIFA World Cup qualification
9	27 October 1968	Dag Hammarskjöld Stadium, Ndola, Zambia	Sudan	4–2	4–2	1970 FIFA World Cup qualification
10	8 November 1968	Al Hilal Stadium, Khartoum, Sudan	Sudan	1–0	2–4	1970 FIFA World Cup qualification
11	17 November 1968	Independence Stadium, Lusaka, Zambia	Mauritius	1–2	2–2	1970 African Cup of Nations qualification
12	8 December 1968	Stade George V, Curepipe, Mauritius	Mauritius	3–2	3–2	1970 African Cup of Nations qualification
13	3 August 1969	Yaoundé, Cameroon	Cameroon	1–0	1–2	1970 African Cup of Nations qualification
14	31 August 1969	Dag Hammarskjöld Stadium, Ndola, Zambia	Malawi	2–0	5–0	Peter Stuyvesant Trophy
15	2 September 1969	Scrivener Stadium, Kitwe, Zambia	Malawi	1–0	7–0	Peter Stuyvesant Trophy
16	1 November 1970	Independence Stadium, Lusaka, Zambia	Tanzania	4–1	5–1	1972 African Cup of Nations qualification
17	18 March 1971	Gymkhana Ground, Zomba, Zambia	Malawi	3–4	4–5	Friendly
18	18 March 1971	Gymkhana Ground, Zomba, Zambia	Malawi	4–5	4–5	Friendly
19	23 March 1971	Kamuzu Stadium, Blantyre, Malawi	Malawi	1–0	3–0	Friendly
20	23 March 1971	Kamuzu Stadium, Blantyre, Malawi	Malawi	2–0	3–0	Friendly
21	8 July 1971	Scrivener Stadium, Kitwe, Zambia	Cyprus	?	3–0	Friendly
22	11 July 1971	Dag Hammarskjöld Stadium, Ndola, Zambia	Cyprus	?	3–0	Friendly
23	11 July 1971	Dag Hammarskjöld Stadium, Ndola, Zambia	Cyprus	?	3–0	Friendly
24	25 July 1971	Dag Hammarskjöld Stadium, Ndola, Zambia	Guinea	1–0	2–1	Friendly
25	8 December 1971	Afraha Stadium, Nakuru, Kenya	Kenya	2–1	2–3	Jamhuri Cup
26	4 June 1972	Dag Hammarskjöld Stadium, Ndola, Zambia	Lesotho	2–1	6–1	1974 FIFA World Cup qualification
27	4 June 1972	Dag Hammarskjöld Stadium, Ndola, Zambia	Lesotho	6–1	6–1	1974 FIFA World Cup qualification
28	22 April 1973	Dag Hammarskjöld Stadium, Ndola, Zambia	Madagascar	3–1	3–1	1974 African Cup of Nations qualification
29	6 May 1973	Antananarivo, Madagascar	Madagascar	1–1	1–2	1970 African Cup of Nations qualification
30	18 November 1973	Stade Kamanyola, Kinshasa, Zaire	Zaire	1–1	1–2	1974 FIFA World Cup qualification
31	12 December 1973	Nairobi City Stadium, Nairobi, Kenya	Kenya	1–1	1–3	Jamhuri Cup
32	4 March 1974	Cairo International Stadium, Cairo, Egypt	Egypt	1–1	1–3	1974 African Cup of Nations
33	27 February 1977	Dag Hammarskjöld Stadium, Ndola, Zambia	Uganda	3–2	4–2	1978 FIFA World Cup qualification
34	27 February 1977	Dag Hammarskjöld Stadium, Ndola, Zambia	Uganda	4–2	4–2	1978 FIFA World Cup qualification
35	26 March 1977	Independence Stadium, Lusaka, Zambia	Malawi	2–0	8–1	Friendly
36	26 March 1977	Independence Stadium, Lusaka, Zambia	Malawi	3–0	8–1	Friendly
37	26 March 1977	Independence Stadium, Lusaka, Zambia	Malawi	7–1	8–1	Friendly
38	26 June 1977	Independence Stadium, Lusaka, Zambia	Algeria	1–0	2–0	1978 African Cup of Nations qualification
39	26 June 1977	Independence Stadium, Lusaka, Zambia	Algeria	2–0	2–0	1978 African Cup of Nations qualification
40	9 October 1977	Dag Hammarskjöld Stadium, Ndola, Zambia	India	1–0	3–1	Friendly
41	5 December 1977	Banadir Stadium, Mogadishu, Somalia	Kenya	1–1	4–2	1977 CECAFA Cup
42	5 December 1977	Banadir Stadium, Mogadishu, Somalia	Kenya	4–1	4–2	1977 CECAFA Cup
43	9 December 1977	Banadir Stadium, Mogadishu, Somalia	Uganda	1–1	1–1	1977 CECAFA Cup
44	28 January 1978	Dag Hammarskjöld Stadium, Ndola, Zambia	Zanzibar	3–0	6–1	Friendly
45	28 January 1978	Dag Hammarskjöld Stadium, Ndola, Zambia	Zanzibar	4–0	6–1	Friendly
46	29 January 1978	Dag Hammarskjöld Stadium, Ndola, Zambia	Zanzibar	5–0	5–0	Friendly
47	5 February 1978	Independence Stadium, Lusaka, Zambia	Swaziland	3–1	11–2	Friendly
48	5 February 1978	Independence Stadium, Lusaka, Zambia	Swaziland	7–2	11–2	Friendly
49	5 February 1978	Independence Stadium, Lusaka, Zambia	Swaziland	11–2	11–2	Friendly
50	7 November 1978	Kamuzu Stadium, Blantyre, Malawi	Uganda	2–1	2–1	1978 CECAFA Cup
51	9 November 1978	Kamuzu Stadium, Blantyre, Malawi	Somalia	1–0	4–0	1978 CECAFA Cup
52	9 November 1978	Kamuzu Stadium, Blantyre, Malawi	Somalia	2–0	4–0	1978 CECAFA Cup
53	13 November 1978	Kamuzu Stadium, Blantyre, Malawi	Kenya	7–0	9–0	1978 CECAFA Cup
54	13 November 1978	Kamuzu Stadium, Blantyre, Malawi	Kenya	8–0	9–0	1978 CECAFA Cup
55	13 November 1978	Kamuzu Stadium, Blantyre, Malawi	Kenya	9–0	9–0	1978 CECAFA Cup
56	17 November 1978	Kamuzu Stadium, Blantyre, Malawi	Uganda	1–0	4–0	1978 CECAFA Cup
57	17 November 1978	Kamuzu Stadium, Blantyre, Malawi	Uganda	2–0	4–0	1978 CECAFA Cup
58	17 November 1978	Kamuzu Stadium, Blantyre, Malawi	Uganda	3–0	4–0	1978 CECAFA Cup
59	17 November 1978	Kamuzu Stadium, Blantyre, Malawi	Uganda	4–0	4–0	1978 CECAFA Cup
60	19 November 1978	Kamuzu Stadium, Blantyre, Malawi	Malawi	1–1	2–3	1978 CECAFA Cup
61	15 April 1979	Kamuzu Stadium, Blantyre, Malawi	Malawi	1–0	2–0	1978 African Cup of Nations qualification
62	29 April 1979	Dag Hammarskjöld Stadium, Ndola, Zambia	Malawi	2–0	2–0	1978 African Cup of Nations qualification
63	30 June 1979	Stade Frederic Kibassa Maliba, Lubumbashi, Zaire	Zaire	2–1	2–1	Friendly
64	4 November 1979	Nairobi City Stadium, Nairobi, Kenya	Uganda	2–0	2–1	1979 CECAFA Cup
65	6 November 1979	National Stadium, Nairobi, Kenya	Tanzania	1–1	2–2	1979 CECAFA Cup
66	25 November 1979	Independence Stadium, Lusaka, Zambia	Lesotho	2–0	5–0	1980 Summer Olympics qualification
67	25 November 1979	Independence Stadium, Lusaka, Zambia	Lesotho	4–0	5–0	1980 Summer Olympics qualification
68	19 April 1980	Barbourfields Stadium, Bulawayo, Zimbabwe	Tanzania	1–0	2–0	Zimbabwe Independence Tournament
69	1 June 1980	Dag Hammarskjöld Stadium, Ndola, Zambia	Ethiopia	2–0	4–0	1982 FIFA World Cup qualification
70	1 June 1980	Dag Hammarskjöld Stadium, Ndola, Zambia	Ethiopia	3–0	4–0	1982 FIFA World Cup qualification
71	29 June 1980	Dag Hammarskjöld Stadium, Ndola, Zambia	Kenya	2–0	5–0	Friendly
72	29 June 1980	Dag Hammarskjöld Stadium, Ndola, Zambia	Kenya	3–0	5–0	Friendly
73	29 June 1980	Dag Hammarskjöld Stadium, Ndola, Zambia	Kenya	5–0	5–0	Friendly
74	22 July 1980	Lenin Stadium, Moscow, Russia	Soviet Union	1–1	1–3	1980 Summer Olympics
75	24 July 1980	Kirov Stadium, St. Petersburg, Russia	Venezuela	1–0	1–2	1980 Summer Olympics
76	30 August 1980	Barbourfields Stadium, Bulawayo, Zimbabwe	Zimbabwe	?	1–1	Friendly
77	2 November 1980	Independence Stadium, Lusaka, Zambia	Angola	1–1	1–1	Friendly
78	7 December 1980	Moi Stadium, Kisumu, Kenya	Kenya	1–0	1–1	Jamhuri Cup
79	12 December 1980	Nairobi City Stadium, Nairobi, Kenya	Kenya	1–1	2–1	Jamhuri Cup

== Statistics ==
Goals by year
Year	Goals
1968	12
1969	3
1970	1
1971	9
1972	2
1973	4
1974	1
1977	11
1978	17
1979	7
1980	12
Total	79

Goals by competition
Competition	Goals
Friendlies	30
FIFA World Cup qualification	10
Africa Cup of Nations	1
Africa Cup of Nations qualification	10
CECAFA Cup	16
Independence Tournaments	2
Jamhuri Cup	4
Peter Stuyvesant Trophy	2
Summer Olympics qualification	2
Summer Olympics	2
Total	79
