= Michael Chabala =

Michael Chabala may refer to:

- Mike Chabala (born 1984), American soccer player
- Michael Chabala (Zambian footballer) (died 1995), Zambian footballer and coach
