= Masauso Mwale =

Zambian soccer coach

Masauso Mwale was a Zambian soccer coach who managed at different Zambian Premier League teams. In 2014, he coached 11–time Zambian football champions Nkana FC. He died in a road accident in 2014 while traveling from Ndola to Kitwe for a soccer match.
