= Noel Sikhosana =

Zambian footballer (born 1965)

Personal information
- Full name: Noel Brightone Nkululeko Sikhosana
- Date of birth: 27 October 1965 (age 61)
- Place of birth: Zambia
- Height: 1.70 m (5 ft 7 in)
- Position: Striker

Senior career*
| Years | Team | Apps | (Gls) |
- Kabwe Warriors
| –1989 | Jomo Cosmos | | |
| 1989-1991 | Bidvest Wits | | |
| 1991 | Wisła Kraków | 1 | (0) |
| 1991–1993 | Kabwe Warriors | | |
| 1994 | Dynamos | | |
- * Club domestic league appearances and goals

Noel Sikhosana (born 27 October 1965) is a Zambian former professional footballer who played as a striker. He was the first African player to play in the Polish top division.
