= Mordon Malitoli =

Zambian footballer (born 1968)

Personal information
- Full name: Mordon Malitoli
- Date of birth: 5 August 1968 (age 58)
- Place of birth: Mufulira, Zambia
- Height: 1.84 m (6 ft 1/2 in)
- Position: Defender

Youth career
- 1983–1984: Lido Stars

Senior career*
Years	Team	Apps	(Gls)
1984–1995	Nkana		
1996	Malindi		
1997–2001	RoPS	126	(8)

International career
1988–1998	Zambia	?	(?)
- * Club domestic league appearances and goals

Mordon Malitoli (born 5 August 1968) is a former Zambia international football defender who played for clubs in Zambia, Zanzibar and Finland.

== Playing career ==
Born in Mufulira, Malitoli began playing club football for local side Nkana F.C. In over a decade with the club, he won seven Zambian Premier League titles, five Zambian Cup titles and finished second in the 1990 African Cup of Champions Clubs.

Later in his career, Malitoli played in Zanzibar with Malindi F.C. and in Finland with Rovaniemen Palloseura.

Malitoli made several appearances for the senior Zambia national football team, including six FIFA World Cup qualifying matches, and he participated in the 1994, 1996 and 1998 African Cup of Nations finals.

== Personal ==
Malitoli was the fifth of eight children and his brother, Kenneth, is also a former Zambia international footballer.
