= Godfrey 'Ucar' Chitalu 107 Stadium =

Multipurpose stadium in Kabwe, Zambia

Coordinates: 14.4497°S 28.4424°E

The Godfrey 'Ucar' Chitalu 107 Stadium, also known as Railways Stadium, is a multi-use stadium in Kabwe, Zambia. It is currently used mostly for football matches and serves as the home for Kabwe Warriors. The stadium holds 10,000 people.

The stadium was originally called Railways Stadium because the team's main sponsor is Zambia Railways. The stadium was renamed in 2012 to honour Godfrey Chitalu, a star player and coach for both the Kabwe Warriors and the Zambia national football team. Chitalu reportedly scored a world record 107 goals in the 1972 season, which is reflected in the stadium's full name.
