= Alex Chola =

Zambian footballer and coach (1956–1993)

- Chola in 1981

Personal information
- Full name: Alexander Chola
- Date of birth: 6 June 1956
- Place of birth: Lubumbashi, Democratic Republic of Congo
- Date of death: 27 April 1993 (aged 36)
- Place of death: Atlantic Ocean, off Gabon
- Position: Forward

Senior career*
Years	Team	Apps	(Gls)
1972–1973	Solbena F.C.		
1974–1979	Mufulira Blackpool		
1980–1985	Power Dynamos		

International career
1975–1985	Zambia	102	(43)

Managerial career
- 1985–1990: Power Dynamos
- 1992–1993: Power Dynamos
- * Club domestic league appearances and goals

Alexander "Alex" Chola (6 June 1956 – 27 April 1993) was a Zambian footballer and coach. Voted Zambian Footballer of the Year in 1976, he is regarded as one of the greatest Zambian players in history and is the country's second highest goal scorer after Godfrey Chitalu. He made a mark at Mufulira Blackpool and Power Dynamos before becoming Dynamos coach and winning the Coach of the Year award in 1992. Chola died in a plane crash off the coast of Gabon on 27 April 1993.

== Playing career ==
Chola was born in Lubumbashi where his father went to work and he reportedly played for local club Solbena F.C. before moving to Ndola as a teenager. After a brief stay, he left for Mufulira and signed with Division II side Mufulira Blackpool in 1974.

=== Mufulira Blackpool ===
Chola's exceptional skills were evident from an early age and he forged a sharp frontline with giant striker John 'Fuso' Lengwe, Lee Mulenga and player-coach Simon "Kaodi" Kaushi. Blackpool won promotion to the Zambian top league and in April 1975, Chola ended defending league champions Green Buffaloes long unbeaten run with a clinical finish at Blackpool's home ground John Kachofa Stadium in Mufulira. It was the first league defeat in over a year for Buffaloes, who had won the title in 1974 without losing a single game.

In July of that same year, Blackpool captain John Botha was removed and suspended indefinitely for issuing disparaging press statements against Kaushi, and Chola was named the new skipper at the age of 19.

Chola was linked with several clubs during his time at Blackpool. Mufulira Wanderers, Rokana United and Green Buffaloes were all after his signature at some point but Blackpool managed to hold on to their prized asset.

In Buffaloes' case, the player changed his mind when told he had to enlist with their sponsors Zambia Army because he wanted to maintain his civilian status and the move to Wanderers did not materialize as it was believed that such a move would have soured relationships between the two clubs.

In 1976, Blackpool won a hard-fought 4-3 Independence Cup final win over town-mates Butondo Western Tigers at Dag Hammarskjöld Stadium in Ndola, with Chola creating two goals and scoring the winner. It was Blackpool's second and last trophy following their Chibuku Cup win of 1972. Despite a mid-table finish, Chola finished the season as Blackpool's top scorer with 20 goals and was named Zambia's Footballer of the year.

In 1978, Blackpool made a strong start going unbeaten in the first 8 games of the season and topping the table. They were still leading with 4 games to go, however were pipped to the title by Wanderers, who finished on top by a single point, when Blackpool lost all three cases which were before the Football Association of Zambia (FAZ) disciplinary committee. In the first one, they lost points to Ndola United at Kamuchanga Stadium when a ball blew up and a replacement could not be found while a 2–2 draw with Red Arrows which was abandoned when Blackpool walked off the pitch after Arrows were awarded a dubious penalty had its result upheld. The third case involved a former Blackpool player who featured for Kabwe United while still on their books but the FAZ ruled against the Mufulira side.

The second-place finish was still an achievement but it was evident Chola had been carrying the team for a long time and fans wondered how much longer he would stay at John Kachofa Stadium. Chola's amazing footwork, ball juggling skills and precise passes unsurprisingly led to the nicknames 'Computer' and 'Master Dribbler.' He inspired a young Kalusha Bwalya who later remarked that Chola "could do incredible things with the ball. It's a pity there was no video at the time."

Following their second-place finish in 1978, Blackpool were expected to make the final step and capture their first ever league title, however, the team was caught in a relegation battle right from the start and finished second bottom, however was saved from relegation when the FAZ increased the number of teams from 16 to 18.

=== Power Dynamos ===
In December 1979, Chola and his family vanished from Mufulira and were reported to be in Kitwe, a move which upset Blackpool officials who felt betrayed and did not know which club had snagged their star as so many clubs were after him . However, Chola denied that he had deserted Blackpool and said he was merely on leave in Mufulira, despite the fact that a big truck was seen transporting his household goods from Mufulira. "I am a big boy and an international footballer. When I want to leave Blackpool, I will inform the public about my intentions to do so.'.

It soon emerged that Chola had been given a job by Copperbelt Power Company, the sponsors of Power Dynamos and this led to Blackpool banning the player indefinitely 'for deserting the club,’ which ruled him out of international matches. This prompted Chola to write a letter of appeal to the FAZ who ruled in his favour and paved the way for his move to Arthur Davies Stadium. He made an instant impression, scoring twice on his debut, the Champion of Champions Cup semi-final on 3 February 1980 in a 2–0 win against Green Buffaloes. A week later, he scored the third goal in the final, a 3–0 triumph over Mufulira Wanderers in Ndola.

He collected more silverware later that year when Dynamos beat Buffaloes 2–0 to win the Independence Cup, and ended the season as the club's top scorer. The following year, Dynamos retained the Champions of Champions Cup and made their debut in the Africa Cup Winners Cup only to be eliminated by Sekondi Hasacaas of Ghana in the quarter-finals. In 1982, they won the Independence Cup for the third time in 4 years, but the league eluded them as they ended the season as runners-up to Kitwe rivals Nkana Red Devils. Dynamos however had a fine run in the Africa Cup Winners Cup, reaching the final only to lose 4–0 on aggregate to Egyptian club Arab Contractors. Chola ended the season as second highest goal-scorer in the Zambian league, runner-up to club-mate Peter Kaumba.

Chola was in the Dynamos team that won the Rothmans International trophy in the 6 nations African Club soccer tournament in Abidjan, Ivory Coast in May 1983, after beating home team Stella Abidjan of Ivory Coast 2–1, FC 105 from Gabon 4-1 and Nigeria's Bendel Insurance 2–1. In the final, Dynamos drew 0–0 with Camerounian giants Tonnere Yaonde FC and won 5–4 on post match penalties with goalkeeper Blackwell Chalwe saving the decisive spot-kick after a goalless 90 minutes.

In July 1983, new Zambia national team coach Wieslaw Grabowski described Chola and his Dynamos teammate Kaumba as world class players with enough potential to play for any division I side in Europe. Grabowski joined the legion of fans who admired Chola's bull juggling skills, but he noted that his teammates did not understand his crisp and timely passes. He further said that although Chola lacked speed, he was an intelligent player who could read the game. At the end of the season, he was runner-up once again to Ashlos Melu on the scorers' chart. In December, Chola and Kaumba signed three-year professional contracts with Africa Sports of Ivory Coast. However, the two returned home in July 1984 and it turned out that a major sponsor of Africa Sports had pulled out so this changed the fortunes of the club and they decided to return to Zambia. The duo arrived just in time to lend a hand to Dynamos final push for the league championship. Chola missed a penalty when Dynamos suffered their only league loss in October 1984, a 2–0 defeat to eventual runners-up Mufulira Wanderers but Dynamos avenged this a week later when they whipped Wanderers 4–1 in the reverse fixture at Arthur Davies Stadium. This helped Dynamos to the title for the first time in their history.

Dynamos were not finished as they crushed Kabwe Warriors 4–2 in the semi-final of the Champion of Champions with Chola grabbing a hat-trick, and when they met Wanderers in the final, Dynamos prevailed 2–0.

The following year in August, Dynamos lost a BP Challenge Cup first round match to Division I side City of Lusaka 3–0, which led to coach Freddie Mwila being sidelined amid reports of dissension from the players who were unhappy with his attitude towards them. He singled out Chola as a possible candidate for his job and Chola stepped up as player-coach, although the Dynamos lost the title to their rivals Nkana by a single point when they failed to beat their cross-town rivals in their penultimate league game at home. They also lost the Champion of Champions trophy to Wanderers. The players though, said they were very happy with Chola's training methods. Chola's younger brother Pascal Kunda played as a midfielder for Ndola United and joined Power Dynamos in 1985.

At the end of the season, Chola called time on his career to focus on coaching. However, attempted a comeback in November 1987 in the Independence Cup final against Kabwe Warriors in Lusaka. He had a hand in Dynamos' first goal scored by Pearson Mwanza but tragedy struck when he was carried off the pitch with a fractured tibia of the left leg in the 28th minute after a late challenge by Warriors' Whiteson Changwe. Dynamos lost the final 3-2 which proved to be the last game he ever played. The match was also remembered for a 63-minute first half. Chola described the incident as unfortunate and not deliberate.

== National team ==
Chola first donned national colours in September 1974 when he featured for Zambia 'B' in a match against Brazilian club Operario in Lusaka. He marked his full international debut against Malawi on 14 April 1975 with a goal in a 3–3 draw during a CAN qualifier in Lusaka.

Chola starred in Zambia's 1976 Olympic Games qualification run, scoring 6 times as Zambia qualified to Montreal 1976. However, Zambia withdrew for political reasons so Chola had to wait 4 more years to make his Olympics bow. In between, he featured for Zambia at CAN 78 where Zambia failed to progress from a group which featured Ghana and Nigeria. In 1980, Zambia were knocked out by Egypt 6–2 on aggregate who subsequently withdrew in protest against the invasion of Palestine by Israel so Zambia took their place. He made two appearances at Moscow 1980 as Zambia were eliminated at the group stage.

In November 1981, Chola was among 8 national team players who were injured when the bus in which they were travelling ploughed into a tree 15 km from Chingola, on their way from a practice match in Chililabombwe. Chola sustained shin and knee injuries and was out of action for a month but was fit enough for the CAN in Libya.

Chola made his second CAN appearance at Libya 1982 where Zambia reached the semi-finals only to lose to the hosts 2–1 after taking an early lead. The following year, Zambia played Sudan in Khartoum in a CAN qualifier and lost 2–1, leaving them with the seemingly achievable aim of winning by one goal to qualify to the next tround. Despite sustained pressure in the second leg in Ndola, they could only manage a scoreless draw, with Chola missing a 55th-minute penalty, for which he came in for a lot of criticism from fans.

Chola put the disappointment behind him and later that year, starred as Zambia beat Egypt 1–0 in the first leg of an Olympic Games qualifier in Lusaka, with Peter Kaumba scoring a header off his free-kick. Zambia lost the second leg 2-0 and bowed out of the race, and this would be Chola's last game for almost two years.

In August 1985, Zambian coach Brightwell Banda, looking for some much needed creativity in midfield recalled Chola who was by that time player-coach at his club Power Dynamos for the two legged knockout qualifier against Nigeria. He made his comeback when Zambia held the Eagles 0–0 in Lagos and the "Master-Dribbler" turned on the magic as he pulled the strings in midfield and Zambia ran out 1–0 winners to dump Nigeria out of the 1986 CAN race.

After another appearance against in a friendly against Botswana, Chola travelled with the Zambian team to Zimbabwe to defend their CECAFA Cup. A 2–2 draw with the hosts and a 3-0 reverse to Uganda put paid to Zambia's chances. Chola featured in both games but was substituted in both games and the coach revealed afterwards that he had been suffering from illness. This turned out to be his last game for Zambia. He made 100 appearances (including 12 Olympics related matches) and scored 43 goals, making him one of Zambia's most capped players second only to Godfrey Chitalu in goalscoring.

In 2006, he was selected by CAF as one of the best 200 African football players of the last 50 years.

== Coaching career ==
Chola got involved in coaching as early as 1976, coaching youngsters in the Buseko Community Centre Club as trainer of the U-14 team which featured Kalusha Bwalya.

In April 1983, Dynamos coach Freddie Mwila spoke of some 'first-choice' players coercing junior colleagues in a futile attempt to oust him from his position. 'A star is only as good as his last game,’ he said. 'Some of these senior players have been below par so far and (Technical Advisor) Bill McGarry and myself have been shouting at them about this. After all, I get paid for shouting at them because that is my job.

In August 1985, Dynamos lost a BP Challenge Cup first round match to Division I side City of Lusaka 3-0 which upset Mwila who suggested a "change of coaches may bring some spark into the team because he may have been telling them the same old techniques". He singled out Chola as a possible candidate for his job. There were reports of dissension from the players as well, unhappy with Mwila's attitude towards them. He resigned and Chola took over, although Dynamos surrendered the title to bitter rivals Nkana Red Devils and the Champion of Champions trophy to Wanderers. The players though, said they were very happy with Chola's training methods.

Five years after leaving Dynamos, Mwila made a sensational return as coach amid reports of some players boycotting training upon hearing the news. Chola was relegated to the role of assistant coach with Scotsman Jim Bone as Technical Advisor. Rechristened 'Power 90,’ Dynamos won three trophies in 1990, just missing out on the league to Nkana.

The following year, Dynamos bagged the big one when they overcame Nigeria's Benue Cement Company Lions 5–4 on aggregate to scoop the Africa Cup Winners Cup, the only Zambian team to have achieved that feat to date. Dynamos had gone down 2–3 in the first leg in Nigeria but were able to win 3–1 at home despite being a goal down at half-time. Dynamos also added the league title for a historic double.

That same year, Chola attended a coaching course in Germany where he was awarded with an advanced diploma in coaching. The following season, he re-assumed coaching responsibilities after the departures of Bone and Mwila and Dynamos embarked on the defence of their Cup Winners Cup trophy. After negotiating their way past Mochudi Centre Chiefs of Botswana in the second round, Dynamos players pressed for higher allowances and boycotted a trip to Burundi which led to Management suspending the entire team for the rest of the season save for goalkeeper Martin Mwamba, defender Webby Chilufya and midfielder Aggrey Chiyangi.

Chola therefore had to make do with a team full of youngsters from the reserve team, players like Winter Mumba, Kenan Simambe, Douglas Mwamba, Changa Chaiwa and Kellies Mwaba. To everyone's surprise, Dynamos finished a credible fifth and lost only eight league games. Chola was rewarded with the Coach of the Year award for the 1992 season.

Following Zambia's surprise defeat to Madagascar in a World Cup Qualifier in Antananarivo in December 1992, coach Samuel Ndhlovu was sacked and Godfrey Chitalu was appointed national team coach with Chola as his assistant. The two put together an exciting team which was tipped to make it all the way to the 1994 World Cup, but on their way to Senegal the team met its fate in the horrific air disaster off the coast of Gabon.

== Death ==
On 27 April 1993, the Zambia national team traveled to Senegal for the first of their 1994 FIFA World Cup qualification games in the group stage. The team's mode of transportation was a Zambian Air Force plane. After refueling in Libreville, Gabon, the plane developed problems and plunged into the sea. Thirty people on board including Michael Mwape, the president of the FAZ, Chola, Chitalu and eighteen players died in the accident.

Chola was survived by a wife Monica and five children. Alex Chola road in Lusaka is named after him in his honour.

== Honours ==
Club Honours

- Zambian Premier League: 1984
- Independence Cup: 1976, 1980 and 1982
- Champion of Champions Cup: 1980, 1981, 1984

Individual Honours

- Zambian Footballer of the Year: 1976
- Zambian Coach of the Year: 1992

== See also ==
- List of men's footballers with 100 or more international caps
