= Kenan Simambe =

Zambian footballer (1974–1993)

Personal information
- Date of birth: 23 August 1974
- Place of birth: Kitwe, Zambia
- Date of death: 27 April 1993 (aged 18)
- Place of death: Atlantic Ocean, off Gabon
- Position: Defender

Senior career*
Years	Team	Apps	(Gls)
1991–1993	Power Dynamos		

International career
1993	Zambia	1	(1)
- * Club domestic league appearances and goals

Kenan Simambe, also known as Kenani Simambe, (23 August 1974 – 27 April 1993) was a Zambian footballer and member of the national team. He was among those killed in the crash of the team plane in Gabon in 1993.

== Career ==
Simambe made his debut for Zambia during the 1994 FIFA World Cup qualifying rounds, scoring a goal against Namibia on his debut on 30 January 1993.

== Career statistics ==
Appearances and goals by national team and year
National team	Year	Apps	Goals
Zambia	1993	1	1
Total		1	1

Scores and results list Zambia's goal tally first, score column indicates score after each Simambe goal.

List of international goals scored by Kenan Simambe
No.	Date	Venue	Cap	Opponent	Score	Result	Competition	Ref.
1	30 January 1993	Independence Stadium, Lusaka, Zambia	1	Namibia	4–0	4–0	1994 FIFA World Cup qualification	
