= Ben Bamfuchile =

Zambian footballer and coach (1960–2007)

Personal information
- Date of birth: 12 April 1960
- Date of death: 27 December 2007 (aged 47)
- Position: Defender

Senior career*
Years	Team	Apps	(Gls)
1977–1989	Rhokana United/Nkana Red Devils		

International career
1984–1985	Zambia		

Managerial career
- 1993–1997: Rhokana United/Nkana Red Devils
- 1999: Zambia U23
- 1999–2000: Zambia
- 2001–2003: Power Dynamos
- 2006–2007: Namibia
- * Club domestic league appearances and goals

Ben Bamfuchile (12 April 1960 – 27 December 2007), also known as Ben Pabili, was a Zambian football defender and coach. Bamfuchile played for the Nkana Red Devils in the 1980s and later coached the same team, as well as the Zambia national football team from 1998 to 2000, holding the distinction of qualifying Zambia to the 2000 African Cup of Nations with best record amongst all the teams of 5 wins and a draw in the 6 qualifying games. Bamfuchile also coached Namibia and therefore coached and led two different teams to the African Cup of Nations; the Zambia national football team in the 2000 African Cup of Nations, and the Namibia national football team in 2008. He managed Namibia from 2006 until his death.

== Playing career ==
Bamfuchile started out by playing for youth teams Chamboli and Luanshiba in Kitwe before joining Nkana Red Devils then known as Rhokana United in 1977. He made his debut for Nkana that same year at right-back in a match against Green Buffaloes in Lusaka which Nkana lost 2–1. According to Bamfuchile, he found it hard to cope with the pace and faked an injury in the 2nd minute but was quickly forced back on by the coaching bench.

For some unclear reason, Bamfuchile was known as Ben Pabili when he was a defender at Nkana alongside players like Jericho Shinde, Fighton Simukonda, Kapambwe Mulenga and Michael Chabala. He scored a career three goals for Nkana and was part of the great Devils team that dominated Zambian league soccer in the 80s and early 90s winning a record 11 titles including 1983 when they finished the season without losing a single league game.

Bamfuchile also made a handful of appearances for the national team and was part of the victorious squad that won the 1984 Confederation of East & Central Africa Football Association (CECAFA) Cup in Uganda though he was not a regular as he fell behind other defenders such as Jones Chilengi, John 'Butcher' Mwanza and Fighton Simukonda. Pabili made another appearance at the CECAFA the following year in Zimbabwe where Zambia failed to defend their title and he scored a goal in Zambia's 2–2 draw with Malawi.

While in his prime, Bamfuchile was at the age of 29 asked by the Nkana management team to stop playing football and embark on a coaching career as the then Nkana head coach Moses Simwala was experiencing poor health. He got the nod ahead of players who had had more illustrious careers such as former Zambia stars Emmanuel Mwape and Jericho Shinde.

== Coaching career ==
Bamfuchile began his coaching career in 1990 as an assistant under Simwala, the man he described as his mentor. When Simwala died in 1992, Bamfuchile took over as head coach and went about purging the older players who were living on past glory. The Red Devils changed their name to Nkana Football Club and swept almost all the silverware that year. He later left Nkana and coached in Swaziland and South Africa but later returned to coach Power Dynamos.

After Zambia's disastrous CAN 1998 outing in Burkina Faso where coach Bukhard Ziese was 'suspended' and George Mungwa was installed as caretaker coach for Zambia's final group game but he expressed no interest in having the job on a permanent basis. Obby Kapita took charge for 3 games and then Fighton Simukonda also coached the team on a temporary basis for 5 games, winning that year's COSAFA cup with a 1–0 victory in Zimbabwe. Simukonda was however brought down to earth when Zambia drew their opening CAN 2000 qualification game with a 1–1 draw with Congo DR in Lusaka.

FAZ then appointed Bamfuchile as coach and Zambia won all the remaining games, including a 1–0 victory away to Congo DR where Zambia had never won before, finishing the qualifiers with the best record in Africa.

Bamfuchile also took charge of the U-23 team during the All Africa Games in Johannesburg in 1999, losing the first game 4–1 to Cameroun but recovering to reach the final where they lost to Cameroun again but this time on penalties after a goalless draw and Zambia went away with the silver medal.

However, it was not all plain-sailing and the cracks started appearing when Zambia lost a COSAFA Cup game 1–0 to Angola earning Bamfuchile the dubious distinction of being the coach who lost Zambia's record of not losing a home game for 14 years. In the run-up to the CAN 2000, Bamfuchile worked in difficult circumstances as the Zambian Football Association (FAZ) was at loggerheads with the government over misappropriation of funds for the previous CAN tournament. As a result, funding to the national team was cut off and Bamfuchile worked under very trying conditions, going without being paid for months on end.

As a result, Zambia's preparations for the CAN 2000 were shambolic, including a 7–1 humiliation to lowly Honduras after which it was revealed that the team had had to survive on junk food before the game. The tour to the Americas was cut short and the team returned home.

Zambia started their CAN 2000 campaign with a 2–0 capitulation to Egypt and two lacklustre draws against Burkina Faso and Senegal promptly ending their interest in the tournament. Fans bayed for Bamfuchile's blood citing among other reasons and rather unfairly, Bamfuchile's laid back approach against Egypt where he appeared to be seated throughout the game and not making any changes when Zambia were chasing the game. Bamfuchile's explanation that he did not want to disturb the rhythm of the team was treated with scorn.

FAZ soon bowed to the fans pressure, revealing that Bamfuchile would be sent on leave to enable him attend a coaching course in Europe and an expatriate coach would take his place. George Mungwa took charge of the team for a while until Dutchman Jan Brouwer was appointed although Bamfuchile remarked that the course he was embarking on the European B coaching licence was something he already had and it was like his employers only wanted him to go and pass time in Europe. Bamfuchile was also engaged in a legal battle with his former employers over unpaid wages until FAZ settled what they owed him.

Bamfuchile attained this qualification after 6 months and returned to coaching Power Dynamos. When Zambia under Patrick Phiri failed to make it to the 2004 Cup of Nations in Tunisia, Kalusha Bwalya was appointed coach of Zambia in 2003, he picked Bamfuchile as his assistant and though the team missed out on World Cup qualification, they made it to the 2006 Cup of Nations where Zambia only managed a lone victory over South Africa and lost to Tunisia and Guinea and bowed out of the tournament early.

When Kalusha Bwalya was forced to resign soon after – in part due to the poor performance at the Nations' Cup but also due to his holding of two positions in the FAZ, that of national coach and vice-president of the association which was against the FAZ constitution – the FAZ took their time in announcing who would be the new coach. When it became apparent that he was not going to be offered the job, Bamfuchile accepted an offer from the Namibian FA to take over as coach of the Brave Warriors. He quickly went about improving the team's fortunes, instilling some much needed discipline in the ranks.

By the end of the 2008 African Nations Cup qualification campaign, Namibia had won their group and Bamfuchile became a hero after he led the Namibians to a 3–2 victory over Ethiopia. However, he threatened to resign from his position and return to his native Zambia in early December 2007 after claiming the Namibian FA had not treated him with respect by not honouring the terms and conditions of his contract, such as providing him with a vehicle and paying him his salary on time.

== Death ==
Bamfuchile first fell ill during the COSAFA mini-tournament in Namibia in August 2007 and his assistant Ronnie Kanelelo took over the reins as Namibia crashed out. Although he recovered to guide the team through the Nations Cup qualifiers, he still had health problems and the Namibian FA went about finding a coach to take the team to the Nations Cup in case his ill-health persisted.

Bamfuchile died at a clinic in Kitwe on 27 December 2007, just 3 weeks before the start of the 2008 African Cup of Nations, leaving behind a wife Tina and 6 children. At his burial FAZ President Teddy Mulonga described him as a hero who achieved his goals.
