= Kalulushi Modern Stars =

Zambian football club

Kalulushi Modern Stars is a Zambian football club. They play in division one - North of Zambian football, the Zambian League. Independence Stadium in Kalulushi, which has a capacity of 8,000, is their home. The club was formed after a split of the then Kalulushi Babes Football Club founded in 1962 into Kalulushi Modern Stars comprising mine employees and 11 Wise-men for municipal community in 1964? The two teams were both in division two.

Kalulushi Modern Stars FC won promotion to the top league then in Division 1 in 1969 after winning the league in Division 2 in 1968. A few other teams in Division 1 included Rhokana Utd, Bancroft Blades, Roan Utd, Mufulira Wanderers and Kabwe Warriors. However the team was demoted to Division 2 in 1971 but again won promotion to Division 1 in 1980. However, the league was re-structured to introduce the Super Division as the top league. The top 12 teams of the 18 teams in then top Division 1 comprised the Premier league. The remaining 6 teams in old Division 1 remained in the new Division 1 and were joined by the top 6 teams from Division 2 were Kalulushi Modern Stars FC topped the league. The new Division 2 comprised the bottom 6 teams from old Division 1 and top 6 teams from old Division 2. The remaining bottom 6 teams in old Division 2 were demoted to Division 3.

In 1983, Kalulushi Modern Stars FC first won promotion to Super Division. The team was demoted to Division 1 in 1996. Since then the team only got promoted to Super Division in 1997 and 2013. It remained in Division 1 and was even demoted to Division 2 in 2000. Currently, the team is in Division 1-North and after playing 17 games of the 34, it lies on second position with 33 points. The team aims for promotion to Super Division in 2016 season.
