= Brightwell Banda =

Zambian football coach (1946–2022)

Banda Brightwell
Personal information
- Date of birth: 22 September 1946
- Place of birth: Zambia
- Date of death: 26 August 2022 (aged 75)
- Place of death: Lusaka, Zambia

Senior career*
Years	Team	Apps	(Gls)
1968–1970	Zambia Army		

Managerial career
- 1971–1980: Zambia Army
- 1976–1986: Zambia
- 1985–1986: Ndola United
- 2004–2005: Red Arrows
- * Club domestic league appearances and goals

Brightwell Banda (22 September 1946 – 26 August 2022) was a Zambian football coach who won Zambia her first ever Council for East and Central Africa Football Associations (CECAFA) Cup in 1984 and was also in charge of Zambia at CAN 1982 and CAN 1986. He later coached Zambia's Division I South side Young Eagles in Chipata.

== Career ==
Banda played his football for Zambia Army (now Green Buffaloes) though he never had a great playing career.

After getting his coaching badges in East Germany, He coached Buffaloes in the mid-70s and first took charge of Zambia with Freddie Mwila on a temporary basis after Ante Buselic's departure, leading Zambia to the 1976 CECAFA tournament in Zanzibar where they lost to Uganda in the final.

Banda filled in again as the FAZ looked for an expatriate coach and his immediate task was to steer Zambia past Uganda in a World Cup qualifier and he managed this thanks in no small part to Godfrey Chitalu’s brace in a 4–2 win on 27 February 1977 in Ndola. And when Ted Virba was sacked in June 1977 after only two and a half months in charge, Banda was back again for a Cup of Nations qualifier against Algeria in Lusaka which Zambia won 2–0 and qualified to CAN 1978 after a penalty shootout.

He was back in the saddle again after Ted Dumitru’s abrupt departure in July 1981 and he led Zambia to a 3–2 aggregate victory over Morocco with a 2–0 second leg victory in Lusaka, a victory which sent Zambia to the 1982 CAN in Libya. Zambia did not have the best of preparations, travelling to Libya without having played any international friendly matches prior to the tournament. Although they lost their opening game to Algeria 1–0, Zambia topped their group with victories over Ethiopia and Nigeria which sent her into the semi-finals where they lost to the hosts 2–1 but salvaged some pride by beating Algeria 2–0 in the third and fourth play-off, a match which the Algerians did not particularly seem interested in.

Banda was then replaced by Bill McGarry but he bounced back two years later, when he took over from Jeff Butler and led the team to their first ever CECAFA success in Uganda in December 1984. His reward was a promotion from Lt. Colonel to full Colonel in the army.

The following year, Banda became the first Zambian to sign a full-time contract as national team coach when he signed a three-year deal and he underlined this when Zambia demolished Cameroun 4–1 in Lusaka in a World Cup qualifier and went through to the next round after a 1–1 draw in Yaoundé in the second leg. They however lost to Algeria 3–0 on aggregate to bow out of the race but knocked out Nigeria of the CAN ‘86 qualifying run after a 0–0 draw in Lagos and 1–0 win in Lusaka. Zambia also failed to defend their CECAFA crown in October which was won by hosts Zimbabwe.

After a disappointing first round exit at Egypt ‘86 which Banda attributed to inadequate preparations, he was relieved of his duties and he went back to his army post. He later served as Technical Advisor of Zambian Premier league side Zanaco and when Red Arrows won their first and only premier league title in 2004, a decision was taken by the teams’ management early the following season to replace the championship winning coach Mathews Phiri with Banda. The reason given for this rather controversial move was the need for someone with more experience to lead Arrows to the group stage of the CAF Champions League.

It was no easy task as Arrows faced defending champions Enyimba of Nigeria. After losing the first leg 3–0, Arrows geared up for the home leg hoping for an upset but were thrashed 6–1 to send them packing. Banda was dismissed shortly after that.

After some time out of the limelight, Banda resurfaced as coach of Young Eagles and the retired army officer was confident of leading the team to the Premier League.

== Later life and death ==
Banda later lived in Chipata.

He died on 26 August 2022, at the age of 75.
