= Nkana F.C. =

Association football club in Zambia

Nkana
- Full name: Nkana Football Club
- Nickname: Kalampa
- Founded: 1932
- Ground: Nkana Stadium, Wusakile, Kitwe
- Capacity: 10,000
- Chairman: Joseph Silwamba
- Manager: [Mwenya Chipepo] (current)
- League: Zambian Premier League
- 2025–26: 13th
Home colours	Away colours

Nkana FC is a football club based in Kitwe, Zambia. The football team competes in the MTN Super League, the top division of Zambian football. Nkana FC has won 13 League titles, making it Zambia's most successful league club, and second overall behind Mufulira Wanderers, with 52 trophies. They play their home games at Nkana Stadium in Wusakile, Kitwe.

The club is currently sponsored by Mopani Copper Mines, which is also the team's major owner. The club has also acquired a kit sponsorship deal with global online gambling company GAL Sports Betting.

In 2020, after the increase in the number of COVID-19 cases recorded in Zambia, Mopani Copper Mines reduced the sponsorship deal to the club by 50 percent, citing the failure of the copper prices due to the pandemic. The club decided to sign other sponsorship deals with The Zambia Revenue Authority and The Copperbelt University.

Nkana FC fans are known for their passionate support of their club.

== History ==
Nkana FC is one of Zambia's oldest football clubs having been formed in 1935 in Kitwe's Wusakile township. The club was founded under the name of Rhokana United FC before it changed to Nkana Red Devils. In 1990, they were runners-up in the African Cup of Champions, the only Zambian team to reach the finals.

Nkana achieved success during the 1980s and early 1990s, winning nine league titles from 1982 to 1993, including their 1993 season in which the club became one of only two clubs, and the only African club, to have won the Sextuple. Coached by Moses Simwala, a number of prominent players ran out for Nkana during this time frame.

Nkana were relegated from the top flight of Zambian football for the first time in 2004, and their period in Division One was plagued by financial problems. Nkana returned to the top flight after winning the 2007 Division One North title.

Nkana has won the MTN/FAZ Super League 13 times, most recently in 2020.

On 23 May 2014, head coach Masautso Mwale died in a road traffic accident on the eve of their home game against Séwé Sport of the Ivory Coast in Group B in the 2014 CAF Confederation Cup. The accident occurred near the Maposa area and his car was overturned several times as he was driving back to join the team in Kitwe.

== Rivals ==
Nkana's arch-rivals are Power Dynamos F.C., who play their games at the Arthur Davies Stadium in the adjacent neighbourhood of Ndeke across the Ndola-Kitwe Dual Carriageway. When the two teams meet, the city is divided, and the fixture is named the Kitwe Derby or "El Kopala".

== Achievements ==
- African Cup of Champions Clubs Runners-up:
  - 1990
- Zambian Premier League: 13
  - 1982, 1983, 1985, 1986, 1988, 1989, 1990, 1992, 1993, 1999, 2001, 2013, 2020
- Zambian Cup: 6
  - 1986, 1989, 1991, 1992, 1993, 2000
- Zambian Charity Shield: 18
  - 1982, 1983, 1984, 1985, 1987, 1989, 1990, 1991, 1993, 1994, 1995, 1996, 1997, 2000, 2014, 2018, 2019, 2020
- Zambian Challenge Cup: 7
  - 1964, 1966 (as Rhokana United)
  - 1992, 1993, 1998, 1999, 2000
- ABSA Cup: 1
  - 2018
- Heinrich Cup/Chibuku Cup/Heroes and Unity Cup: 5
  - 1969, 1974, 1989, 1990, 1993
- Zambian Champion of Champions Cup: 2
  - 1986, 1993

== Performance in CAF competitions ==
- CAF Champions League: 3 appearances
  2000 – Second Round
  2002 – Second Round
  2014 – Second Round
- African Cup of Champions Clubs: 9 appearances
  1983: Semi-Finals
  1984: Quarter-Finals
  1986: Semi-Finals
  1987: Second Round
  1989: Semi-Finals
  1990: Finalist
  1991: Semi-Finals
  1992: Quarter-Finals
  1993: Quarter-Finals
  1994: Semi-Finals
- CAF Cup Winners' Cup: 2 appearances
  1998 – Quarter-Finals
  2001 – Second Round
- CAF Cup: 1 appearance
  1999 – Second Round

== Former coaches ==
- (Zambia) Gaston Mutobo
- (England) Jeff Butler
- (Zambia) Beston Chambeshi
- (Zambia) Jericho Shinde
- (Zambia) Moses Simwala (1980–93)
- (Zambia) Patrick Phiri (1997–02)
- (Zambia) Ben Bamfuchile
- (Zambia) Kenneth Malitoli (2007)
- (Zambia) Masauso Mwale (2013–14)
- Zeddy Saileti
- Manfred Chabinga

== See also ==
- Kitwe Derby
