= List of Zambians =

This is a list of famous or notable Zambians, or people of Zambian descent, or people who have influenced Zambia listed in the following categories, and in no particular order:

== Businesspeople ==
- Geoffrey Bwalya Mwamba
- Saviour Chibiya
- Hakainde Hichilema
- Rajan Mahtani
- Sylvia Masebo
- Clever Mpoha
- Susan Mulikita

== Politics ==
=== Politicians ===
==== Presidents ====
- Kenneth David Kaunda – President – 1964–1991
- Frederick Titus Jacob Chiluba – President – 1991–2001
- Levy Patrick Mwanawasa – President – 2001–2008
- Rupiah Bwezani Banda – President – 2008–2011
- Michael Chilufya Sata – President – 2011–2014
- Dr. Guy Scott – Acting President – October 2014 – January 2015
- Edgar Lungu – President – 2015–2021
- Hakainde Hichilema – President – 2021–Current

==== Vice presidents ====
- Reuben Chitandika Kamanga – Vice President – 1964–1967
- Simon Kapwepwe – Vice President – 1967–1970
- Mainza Mathias Chona – Vice President – 1970–1973
  (post abolished thereafter and reintroduced in 1991)
- Levy Patrick Mwanawasa – Vice President – 1991–1994
- Godfrey Miyanda – Vice President – 1994–1997
- Christon Tembo – Vice President – 1997–2001
- Enoch P. Kavindele – Vice President – 2001–2003
- Nevers Mumba – Vice President – 2003–2004
- Lupando Katoloshi Mwape – Vice President – 2004–2006
- Rupiah Bwezani Banda – Vice President – 2006–2008
- George Kunda – Vice President – 2008–2011
- Dr. Guy Scott – Vice President – 2011–2014
- Inonge Wina – Vice President – 2015–2021
- Mutale Nalumango – Vice President – 2021–Current

==== Prime ministers ====
- Mainza Chona – Prime Minister, 1973–1975, 1977–1978
- Elijah Mudenda – Prime Minister, 1975–1977
- Daniel Lisulo – Prime Minister, 1978–1981
- Nalumino Mundia – Prime Minister, 1981–1985
- Kebby Musokotwane – Prime Minister, 1985–1989, Secretary-General, UNIP 1989–1991, Opposition President, 1992
- Malimba Masheke – Prime Minister, 1989–1991 (post abolished thereafter)

==== Others ====
- Akashambatwa Mbikusita-Lewanika – former minister/democratic campaigner
- Anderson Mazoka – former opposition leader (1998–2006)
- Austin Liato – former minister/labour leader, former Pan-African Parliament MP
- Besa Mumba – youngest female commercial pilot
- Besnat Jere – former Pan-African Parliament MP
- Chibesa Kankasa – Zambian freedom fighter and politician
- Crispin Shumina – former MP, former Pan-African Parliament MP
- Dickson Jere – former Special Assistant to the President for Press and Public Relations, under Rupiah Banda
- Edward Makuka Nkoloso – former director of Zambia National Academy of Science, Space Research and philosophy
- Elias Chipimo Jnr – retired opposition leader
- Gladys Nyirongo – former Lands Minister
- Hakainde Hichilema – opposition leader (2006–2021 (Became president))
- Inonge Mbikusita-Lewanika – diplomat, former UNICEF Regional Adviser for Africa, Presidential Candidate (2001)
- Kabinga Pande – former Foreign Affairs Minister
- Kalombo Mwansa – former Foreign Affairs Minister
- Luke Mwananshiku – former Finance Minister
- M. K. Mubanga – former Pan-African Parliament MP
- Mundia Sikatana – former Justice Minister
- Ompie Nkumbula-Lieventhal – former MP, former Pan-African Parliament MP
- Patrick Anthony Mwewa Chikusu – Deputy Minister of Health in the Republic of Zambia
- Peter Daka – Minister of science and technology, former Pan-African Parliament MP
- Ronnie Shikapwasha – former Information Minister
- Susan Nakazwe – former Mayor of Lusaka
- Thokozile Muwamba – first female fighter pilot
- Vaughan Gething – former First Minister of Wales
- Nina Tapula, Zambia's first female military pilot

=== Traditional rulers ===
Chieftainships are listed here. These articles cover all holders of the traditional titles; prominent individual holders may also have their own articles, usually in People in the History of Zambia below.

Other notable traditional leaders include:

- Chitimukulu
- Mwata Kazembe
- Chief Kanongesha
- Chief Monze
- Litunga
- Paramount Chief Mpezeni
- Chief Mporokoso

== Religious figures ==
- Emmanuel Milingo – Christian leader, has established the 'Married Priests Now' organisation in the US
- Adrian Mung'andu – Catholic archbishop of Lusaka

== Sports ==
=== Footballers ===
- Abel Kanyamuna
- Ackim Musenge
- Alex Chola
- Andrew Sinkala
- Andrew Tembo
- Ashos Melu
- Barbara Banda
- Billy Mwanza
- Bizwell Phiri
- Boniface Simutowe
- Brighton Sinyangwe
- Diana Chikotesha, referee
- Charly Musonda
- Chaswe Nsofwa
- Chris Katongo
- Clifford Mulenga
- Clive Hachilensa
- Collins Mbesuma
- David Chabala
- Davies Phiri
- Dennis Lota
- Derby Makinka
- Dick Chama
- Dickson Makwaza
- Dominic Yobe
- Donwell Yobe
- Edwin Mbaso
- Efford Chabala
- Elijah Litana
- Elijah Tana
- Emmanuel Mayuka
- Emmanuel Mwape
- Emmanuel Zulu
- Emment Kapengwe
- Enock Mwepu
- Eston Mulenga
- Evans Katebe
- Fashion Sakala
- Felix Katongo
- Fighton Simukonda
- Francis Kasonde
- Frederick Kashimoto
- Freddie Mwila
- George Kolala
- Ghost Mulenga
- Gibby Mbasela
- Gift Kampamba
- Godfrey 'Ucar' Chitalu
- Godfrey Kangwa
- Guus Til
- Harry Milanzi
- Henry Nyambe Mulenga
- Hijani Himoonde
- Hillary Makasa
- Ian Bakala
- Isaac Chansa
- Jacob Mulenga
- James Chamanga
- Jericho Shinde
- John Soko
- Johnson Bwalya
- Jones Chilengi
- Jones Mwewa
- Joseph Musonda
- Kaiser Kalambo
- Kalililo Kakonje
- Kalusha Bwalya
- Kapambwe Mulenga
- Kelvin Mutale
- Kenan Simambe
- Kennedy Mweene
- Kenneth Malitoli
- Laughter Chilembe
- Linos Chalwe
- Lucky Msiska
- Lushomo Mweemba
- Mark Sinyangwe
- Misheck Lungu
- Mordon Malitoli
- Moses Masuwa
- Moses Sichone
- Moses Simwala
- Mumamba Numba
- Mwape Miti
- Noah Chivuta
- Numba Mwila
- Patrick Phiri
- Patrick Banda
- Patson Daka
- Perry Mubanga
- Perry Mutapa
- Peter Kaumba
- Phillimon Chepita
- Rabson Mucheleng'anga
- Rainford Kalaba
- Richard Mwanza
- Richard Stephenson
- Robert Earnshaw
- Robert Watiyakeni
- Rodgers Kola
- Rotson Kilambe
- Samuel Chomba
- Samuel "Zoom" Ndhlovu
- Stophira Sunzu
- Timothy Mwitwa
- Vincent Chileshe
- Whiteson Changwe
- Willie Phiri
- Winter Mumba
- Wisdom Mumba Chansa
- Zacharia Simukonda
- Zeddy Saileti

=== Athletes ===
- Samuel Matete
- Muzala Samukonga
- Racheal Nachula
- Tonny Wamulwa
- Obed Mutanya
- Fackson Nkandu
- Godfrey Siamusiye

=== Boxers ===
- Cassius Chiyanika
- Charm Chiteule
- Chisanda Mutti
- Davis Mwale
- Felix Bwalya
- Hastings Bwalya
- Keith Mwila
- Kennedy Kanyanta
- Lottie Mwale
- Lucky Mutale
- Precious Makina
- Catherine Phiri
- Esther Phiri

=== Other sports ===
- Corné Krige captain of South African rugby Springbok world cup
- Ellis Chibuye, boxer
- Felix Bwalya, boxer
- George Gregan, captain of Australian rugby team
- Madalitso Muthiya, golfer
- Obed Mutanya, long distance runner
- PG Nana, cricketer
- Samuel Matete world champion 400m hurdles
- Yunus Badat, cricketer
- Amon Simutowe, chess grandmaster
- Bob Hesford England rugby
- Daffyd James Wales rugby
- Phil Edmonds England cricket
- Neal Radford England cricket
- Jeff Whitley Northern Ireland football
- Robert Earnshaw Wales football
- Ian McCallum South Africa rugby Springbok
- Roy McCallum South Africa rugby Springbok
- Satwant Singh International rally driver
- Steve Arneil youngest ever international rugby player aged 16 and karate expert

== Musicians ==
- Backxwash, Zambian-Canadian rapper
- Denise Chaila, Irish-Zambian rapper, singer, poet, grime, and hip hop artist
- Emeli Sandé, singer
- Matthew Ngosa, singer
- Paul Ngozi, musician, band leader of the Ngozi Family rock band
- Samantha Mumba, Irish-Zambian singer
- Sampa The Great, singer, rapper, songwriter
- Yo Maps, singer

== Authors ==
- Dambisa Moyo
- Field Ruwe
- Binwell Sinyangwe
- Wilbur Smith
- Ellen Banda-Aaku
- Namwali Serpell
- Fwanyanga Mulikita
- Kenneth Kaunda
- Andrew Kaumba

== Chess players ==
- Amon Simutowe

== Zambian lawyers ==
- Likando Kalaluka – Attorney General of the republic of Zambia from 2015 to 2021
- Nelly Mutti
- Bokani Soko – Prominent business and lawyer

== Media and TV ==
- Jonah Buyoya – Zambian journalist
- Mary Mbewe – Zambian journalist, and executive editor
- Smokey Haangala – Zambian journalist, poet, writer, composer, musician

== Physicians ==
- Aaron Mujajati
- Natasha Salifyanji Kaoma, medical doctor, and organization founder

== Other people born in/related to Zambia ==
- Steve Arneil – Karate Kyokushin practitioner born in South Africa, but lived in Zambia
- Joseph and Luka Banda – Conjoined twins
- Lukwesa Burak – Sky News anchor based in London
- Norman Carr – British wildlife conservationist who set up national parks in Zambia
- John Edmond – Zambian-born Rhodesian singer
- Phil Edmonds – English cricketer born in Lusaka
- Robert Earnshaw – Zambian-born Welsh international football player
- Stanley Fischer – Zambian-born Deputy Chairman of the U.S. Federal Reserve Bank and Governor of the Bank of Israel
- Tawny Gray – sculptor
- George Gregan – Zambian-born captain of the Australian Wallabies Rugby Union team
- Amy Holmes – Zambian-born (Zambian father, American mother), The Blaze news anchor and CNN political contributor
- Daffyd James – Zambian-born Welsh international rugby player
- V. M. Jones – Author
- Arthur Kalaluka – military officer
- Corné Krige – Zambian-born South African Springboks Rugby Union team captain
- Robert Lange – Zambian-born record producer and songwriter
- Chilu Lemba – Radio and TV presenter
- Rozalla Miller – British/Zimbabwean singer born to a Zambian mother
- Dambisa Moyo – International economist and best-selling author, born and raised in Lusaka
- Martin Mubanga – Zambian extrajudicial prisoner of the United States
- Monica Musonda – Lawyer turned entrepreneur
- Lucy Muyoyeta – Zambian women's rights activist
- Rungano Nyoni – Zambian-born Welsh director
- Nsofwa Petronella Sampa – Psychological counselor and HIV activist
- Emeli Sandé – British singer, Zambian father
- Denise Scott Brown – Zambian-born American architect
- David Shepherd – British conservationist who has painted Zambian wildlife
- Kapelwa Sikota (1928–2006) – First Zambian registered nurse
- Hammerskjoeld Simwinga – Conservationist/environmentalist
- Peter Amos Siwo – Pioneering graduate and civil servant
- Wilbur Smith – Zambian-born (Ndola) British/South African author
- Jeff Whitley – Zambian-born played for Northern Ireland
- Henry Olonga – Zambian-born cricketer played for Zimbabwe

== Other prominent figures in the history of Zambia ==
This is a list of deceased historical figures (or sub-lists of them) in Zambia and its antecedent territories, and combines Zambians, Africans and non-Zambians including British people and Northern Rhodesians.

- Robert Edward Codrington – colonial administrator of the two territories ruled by the British South Africa Company (BSAC) which later became Zambia
- Father Jean-Jacques Corbeil – Canadian missionary and ethnographer of Bemba culture
- Dan Crawford – missionary pioneer
- Bishop Joseph Dupont – missionary pioneer
- Sir Stewart Gore-Browne – called Chipembele by Africans, soldier, pioneer white settler, builder, politician and supporter of independence in Northern Rhodesia
- List of governors of Northern Rhodesia
- List of governors-general of the Federation of Rhodesia and Nyasaland
- Evelyn Dennison Hone – last governor of Northern Rhodesia
- Alice Lenshina – leader of the Lumpa religious sect
- General Paul von Lettow-Vorbeck – leader of German East Africa forces of World War I
- Lewanika – Litunga of the Lozi
- David Livingstone – British Scottish missionary-explorer
- Michael Mataka – first native Zambian to become police commissioner
- Mwata Kazembe – Chief of the Kazembe-Lunda
- Mpezeni – warrior-king of one of the largest Ngoni groups of central Africa
- Nalumino Mundia – Prime Minister, 1981–1985
- Alick Nkhata – popular Zambian musician and broadcaster in the 1950s through to the mid-1970s
- Baldwin Nkumbula
- Harry Nkumbula – Nationalist leader who assisted in the struggle for the independence of Northern Rhodesia from British colonialism
- Mwene Chitengi Chiyengele – Mbunda chief who led his tribesmen from north-eastern Angola to Bulozi, western Zambia around 1795.
- Cecil Rhodes – English-born businessman, mining magnate, and politician in South Africa and an ardent believer in colonialism and imperialism, founder of the state of Rhodesia
- Sebetwane – Basotho chief who fled from Shaka Zulu, eventually conquering and settling in Western Province
- Mamochisane – daughter of Sebetwane, succeeded him as Makololo queen
- Sekeletu – Makololo King of Barotseland in western Zambia from about 1851 to his death in 1863
- Alfred Sharpe – British administrator and agent for Cecil Rhodes
- Lawrence Aubrey Wallace
- Roy Welensky – leader of white trade union and settler politician
- Rohan Oza creator of Vitamin Water in the US, sold to Coca-Cola

== See also ==
- History of Zambia
- List of Zambia-related topics
- List of Mbunda Chiefs in Zambia
