= Rabson =

Rabson is both a surname and a given name. Notable people with the name include:

== Surname ==
- Alan S. Rabson (1926–2018), American cancer researcher
- Arnold B. Rabson, American scientist
- Ann Rabson (1945–2013), American blues musician and singer
- Jan Rabson (1954–2022), American actor and voice actor

== Given name ==
- Rabson Mucheleng'anga (born 1989), Zambian footballer

== See also ==
- Rabson–Mendenhall syndrome, insulin receptor disorder
