= Mpezeni =

Mpezeni may refer to:

- Mpezeni I (c. 1830–1900), warrior-king and paramount chief of the Ngoni people in Central Africa
- Mpezeni II (died 1941), Ngoni paramount chief
- Mpezeni III (died 1981), Ngoni paramount chief
- Mpezeni IV (1956–2026), Ngoni paramount chief, son of the above
