= Nyumbu =

Nyumbu may refer to:

- Prince Munamwene Nyumbu Luputa (fl. 19th c.), one of the nephews of the King Mwene Chingumbe and cousins of Mwene Chitengi Chiyengele
- John Nyumbu (born 1985), Zimbabwean cricketer
