= Kankasa =

Kankasa is a surname. Notable people with the surname include:

- Chibesa Kankasa (1936–2018), Zambian freedom fighter
- Tukiya Kankasa-Mabula, Zambian lawyer
