= Besa Mumba =

Zambian aviator

Besa Mumba (born 9 December 1996) is a Zambian pilot. She is currently the youngest female commercial pilot in Zambia and Africa.

== Education ==
Mumba was born on 9 December 1996 in Lusaka. She started schooling in 1999 at Sunshine Primary School. Before going for flight training in South Africa, she had her high school education at St Mary's.

== Career ==
Mumba trained at the South African Flight Training Academy in Heidelberg where she acquired her Private pilot licence after two years in 2015. After an extra training at SIMU Flight in Pretoria, she obtained her Commercial pilot licence in July 2015. She then joined Proflight Zambia, in 2016, where she currently works as a First Officer.

== See also ==
- Nina Tapula, Zambia's first female military pilot, Captain in the Zambian Air Force
- Yichida Ndlovu, Zambia's first commercial pilot
