= Arthur Kalaluka =

Zambian military officer (born 1969)

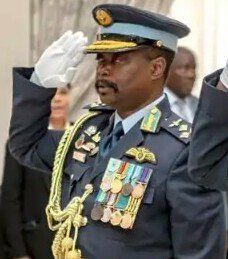
- Maj Gen Kalaluka at the Swearing In Ceremony, State House, 2023
- Born: Arthur Kalaluka; 25 January 1969 (age 57); Lusaka, Zambia
- Military career
- Allegiance: Zambia
- Branch: Zambia Air Force
- Service years: 1990–present
- Rank: Major General
Military offices
Preceded by Major General Oscar Nyoni	Deputy Commander of the Zambia Air Force; 2023–present

Arthur Kalaluka (born 25 January 1969) is a Zambian military officer and has been deputy force commander of the Zambia Air Force since 20 December 2023.

On 20 December 2023, President Hichilema promoted Brigadier General Kalaluka to the rank of Major General and appointed him as the Deputy Commander of the Zambia Air Force. This appointment followed the promotion of Oscar Nyoni to the rank of Lieutenant General and his new role as the Zambia Air Force Commander.
