= Ian McCallum =

Ian McCallum may refer to:

- Ian McCallum (guitarist), an English guitarist and songwriter
- Ian McCallum (rugby union), former South African rugby union player
