= Ruth L. Kirschstein =

American pathologist (1926–2009)

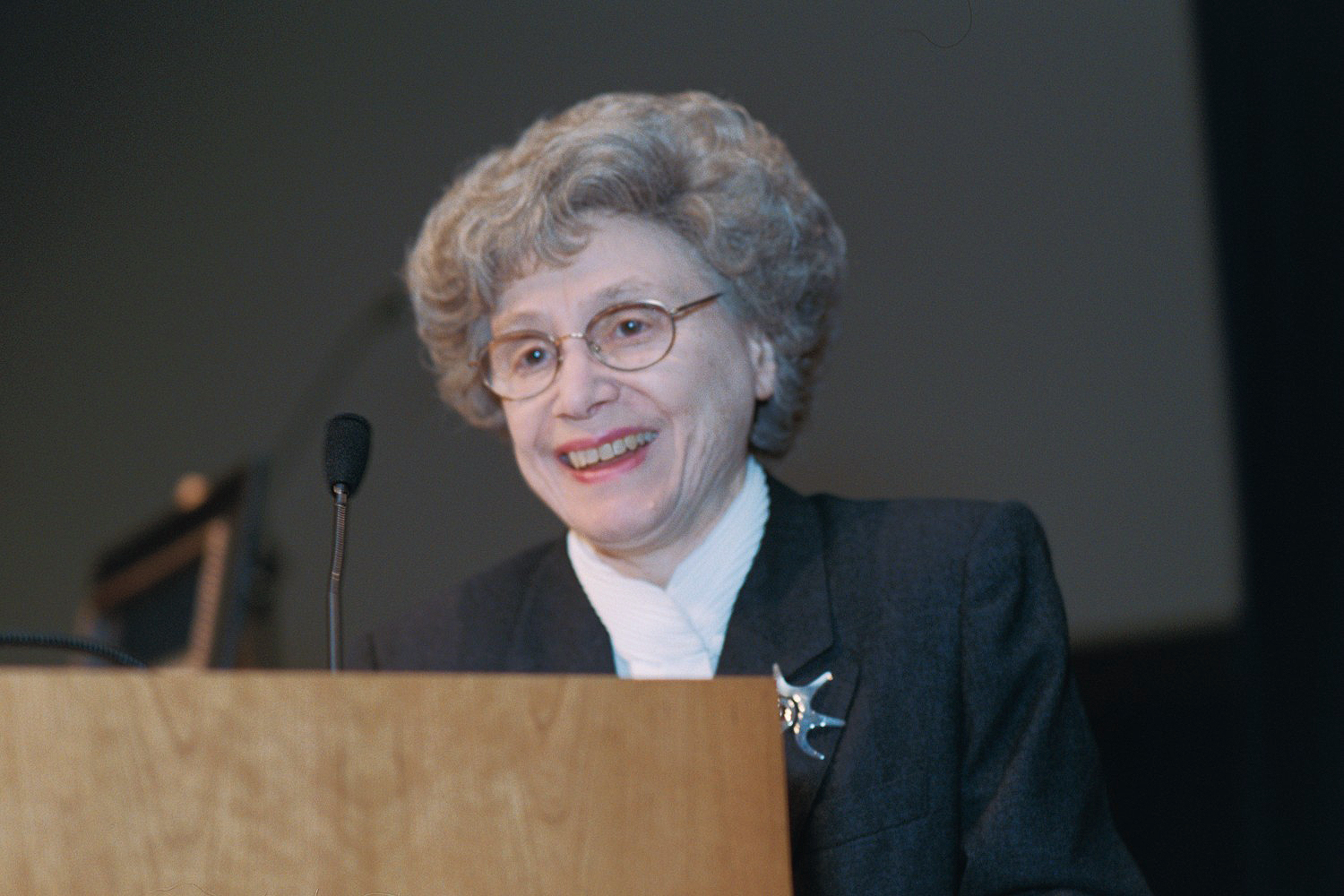
- Born: 12 October 1926; Brooklyn, New York
- Died: 6 October 2009 (aged 82); Bethesda, Maryland
- Education: Long Island University (BA); Tulane University School of Medicine (MD)
- Known for: Polio vaccine safety research. First woman appointed to direct a major National Institutes of Health (NIH) institute, National Institute of General Medical Sciences (NIGMS).
- Spouse: Alan S. Rabson
- Children: Arnold B. Rabson
- Awards: Election to the Institute of Medicine and the American Academy of Arts and Sciences, U. S. Public Health Service (PHS) Superior Service Award (1978), the Presidential Meritorious Executive Rank Award (1980), PHS Special Recognition Award (1985), Presidential Distinguished Executive Rank Award (the highest honor for a career civil servant) (1985), and the Women of Achievement Award from the Jewish Anti-Defamation League (2000)
- Scientific career
- Fields: Pathology, Government Administration

Ruth Lillian Kirschstein (12 October 1926 – 6 October 2009) was an American pathologist and science administrator at the National Institutes of Health (NIH). Kirschstein served as director of the National Institute of General Medical Sciences, deputy director of NIH in the 1990s, and acting director of the NIH in 1993 and 2000-2002.

She was a fellow of the American Academy of Arts and Sciences and a member of the Institute of Medicine. In 2002, Congress renamed the NIH graduate student fellowship program to the Ruth L. Kirschstein National Research Service Award in honor of Kirschstein's work at the NIH.

== Biography ==
Kirschstein was born to a family of Russian Jewish descent in Brooklyn, New York in 1926. Although she had trained as a classical pianist, she pursued medicine, graduating in 1947 from Long Island University and earning a medical degree from Tulane University in 1951. She interned in medicine and surgery at Kings County hospital and completed medical residencies in pathology at Providence Hospital in Detroit, Tulane University Hospital, and the Clinical Center at the NIH.

== Family ==
She was married for 59 years to Alan S. Rabson, a pathologist and a deputy director of the National Cancer Institute.

Kirschstein's only child, Arnold B. Rabson, was born in 1955, the year she and her husband arrived at the NIH.

== Research ==
Kirschstein joined NIH in 1955. She studied clinical pathology, laboratory medicine, virally-induced cancer and developed the safety test for the polio vaccines following the 1955 Cutter Incident, in addition to working on the safety of the measles vaccine.

In 1972, Kirschstein became deputy director of the Division of Biologics Standards, a research division that was transferred from NIH to the Food and Drug Administration, where she investigated the safety of the artificial sweetener cyclamate. When she returned to the NIH in 1974, Kirschstein became the first woman to direct an institute when she was appointed the director of the National Institute of General Medical Sciences (NIGMS). At NIGMS, she raised the profile of the institute, persuading Congress to dramatically increase funding of basic medical science research. She also championed research training support, particularly for under-represented minorities, work that was recognized by the Congressionally-mandated renaming of the National Research Service Awards, as the Ruth L. Kirschstein National Research Service Awards. Kirschstein served as Deputy Director of the NIH under Dr. Harold Varmus, from 1993 to 1999. She served as Acting Director of the National Institutes of Health on two occasions, in 1993, and again from 2000-2002.

== Awards ==
She received honorary degrees from the University of Rochester School of Medicine, Long Island University, Atlanta University, Medical College of Ohio, Brown University, Tulane University, and Mount Sinai School of Medicine.

Among the awards received by Kirschstein are the Georgeanna Seegar Jones Women's Health Lifetime Achievement Award, the Federation of American Societies for Experimental Biology's Public Service Award, the American Medical Association's Dr. Nathan Davis Award, the Harvey Wiley FDA Special Citation, Presidential Rank Award of Distinguished Executive (the country's highest civil service honor), the PHS Equal Opportunity Achievement Award, the Alice C. Evans Award, and superior service awards from the Department of Health, Education and Welfare and the United States Public Health Service. She was an elected member of the Institute of Medicine (National Academy of Medicine).
