= Colin Barry =

Zambian military personnel

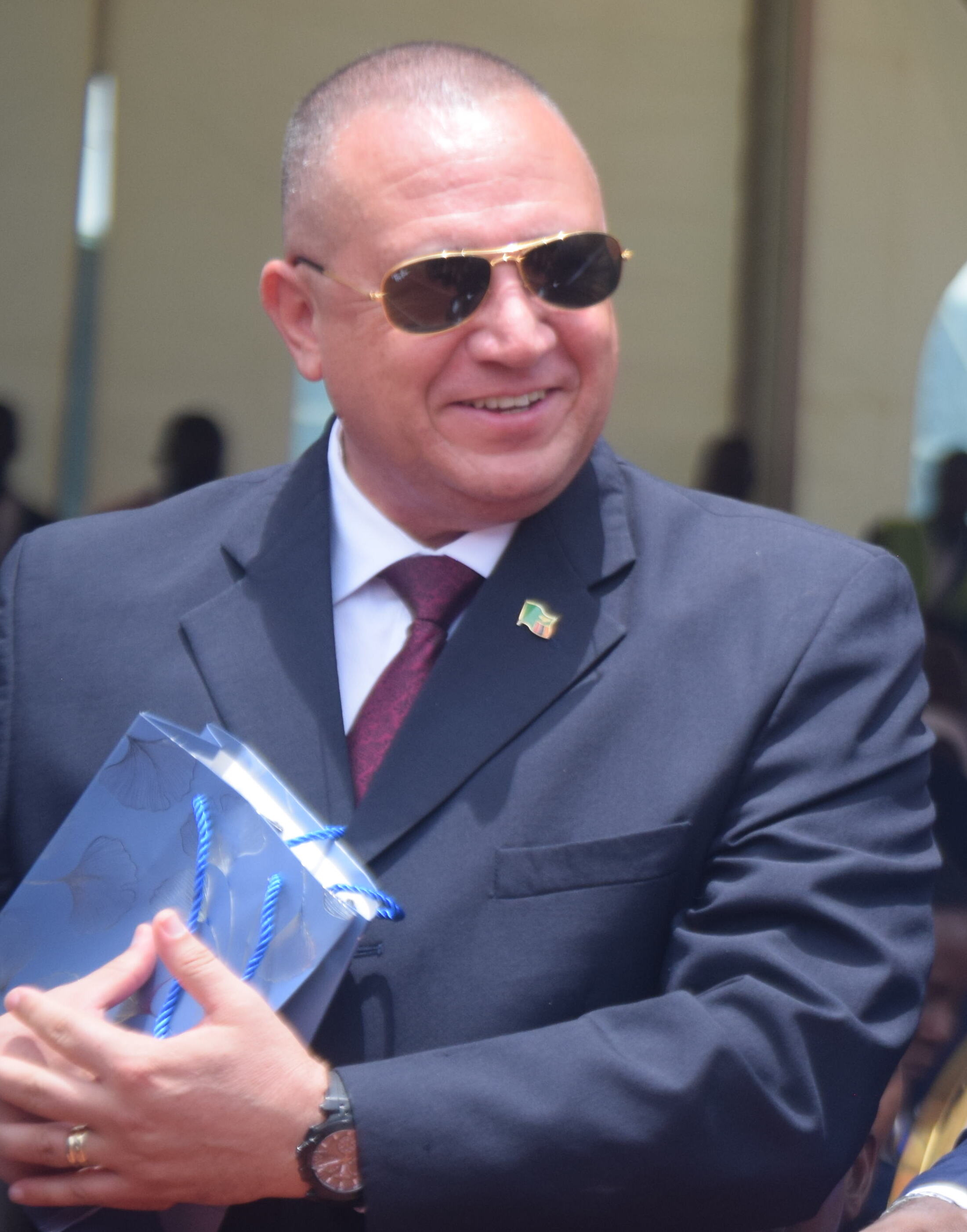
- Barry in 2023
- Born: Colin Barry; May 5, 1974; Solwezi, Zambia
- Military career
- Allegiance: Zambia
- Branch: Zambia Air Force
- Service years: 1993 – December 20, 2023
- Rank: Lieutenant General
Military offices
Preceded by Lieutenant General David Muma	Commander of the Zambia Air Force; 2021 – 2023	Succeeded by Lieutenant General Oscar Nyoni

Lieutenant General Colin Barry (born 5 May 1974) is a retired Zambian military officer and commander of the Zambia Air Force from 2021 until December 20, 2023.

== Early childhood and education ==
Barry obtained primary education at Kikombe Primary School in Solwezi and his secondary school education at Solwezi Technical School (SOTECH). While in primary school he joined the Boy's Scouts.

== Military career ==
In 2021, Barry was appointed Commander of the Zambia Air Force by President Hakainde Hichilema. He served until December 20, 2023, when President Hichilema terminated his appointment as Zambia Air Force Commander and appointed Oscar Nyoni as his immediate successor.
