= National Institute of General Medical Sciences =

Medical research agency of the US Federal Government

Coordinates: 38°59′50″N 77°5′59″W

Agency overview
- Formed: 1962
- Jurisdiction: Federal Government of the United States
- Agency executive: Jon Lorsch, Ph.D., Director
- Parent department: Department of Health and Human Services
- Parent agency: National Institutes of Health
- Website: www.nigms.nih.gov

The National Institute of General Medical Sciences (NIGMS) is one of the National Institutes of Health (NIH), the principal medical research agency of the United States Federal Government. NIH is a component of the U.S. Department of Health and Human Services.

== Overview ==
The NIGMS supports basic research that increases understanding of biological processes and lays the foundation for advances in disease diagnosis, treatment, and prevention. NIGMS-funded scientists investigate how living systems work at a range of levels, from molecules and cells to tissues and organs, in research organisms, humans, and populations. Additionally, to ensure the vitality and continued productivity of the research enterprise, NIGMS provides leadership in training the next generation of scientists, in enhancing the diversity of the scientific workforce, and in developing research capacity throughout the country.

All NIH Institutes and Centers support basic research that is relevant to the diseases, organ systems, stages of life, or populations within their mission areas. In contrast, NIGMS supports fundamental research that does not focus on those specific areas. NIGMS' research mission is aimed at understanding the principles, mechanisms, and processes that underlie living organisms, often using research models. NIGMS also supports the development of fundamental methods and new technologies to achieve its mission. NIGMS-supported research may utilize specific cells or organ systems if they serve as models for understanding general principles.

NIGMS also supports research in specific clinical areas that affect multiple organ systems: anesthesiology and peri-operative pain; sepsis; clinical pharmacology that is common to multiple drugs and treatments; and trauma, burn injury, and wound healing.

NIGMS is organized into the following divisions that support research, research training, and capacity building in a range of scientific fields:

- Division of Biophysics, Biomedical Technology, and Computational Biosciences
- Division of Genetics and Molecular, Cellular, and Developmental Biology
- Division of Pharmacology, Physiology, and Biological Chemistry
- Division for Research Capacity Building
- Division of Training, Workforce Development, and Diversity

NIGMS was established in 1962. In Fiscal Year 2017, the institute's budget was $2.6 billion. The vast majority of this money funds grants to scientists at universities, medical schools, hospitals, and other research institutions throughout the country. At any given time, NIGMS supports more than 3,000 investigators and 4,000 research grants—around 11 percent of the total number of research grants funded by NIH as a whole. Additionally, NIGMS supports approximately 26 percent of the NRSA trainees who receive assistance from NIH.

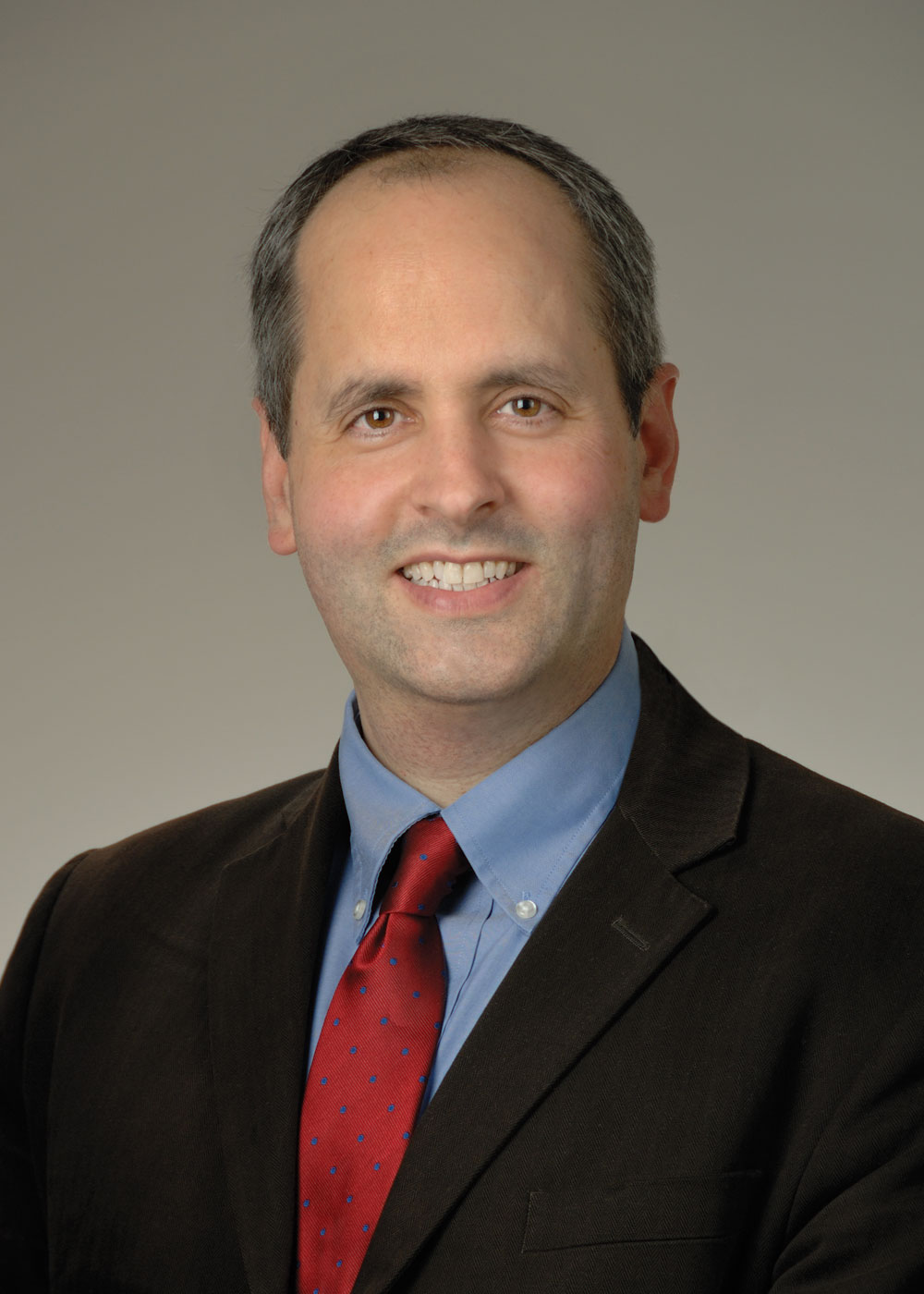
Jon Lorsch, Ph.D., current director of the National Institute of General Medical Sciences

NIGMS produces a number of free science education materials on topics such as cell biology, genetics, chemistry, pharmacology, structural biology, and computational biology. The institute also produces the magazine Findings.

== Past directors ==
The following people have served as Director of the NIGMS:

No.	Portrait	Director	Took office	Left office	Refs.
1		Clinton C. Powell	July 1962	July 1964	
2		Frederick L. Stone	August 1964	April 1970	
3		DeWitt Stetten Jr.	October 1970	August 1974	
4		Ruth L. Kirschstein	September 1974	June 30, 1993	
acting		Marvin Cassman	July 1, 1993	August 1996	
5		Marvin Cassman	August 1996	May 2002	
acting		Judith H. Greenberg	May 2002	November 2003	
6		Jeremy M. Berg	November 2003	July 12, 2011	
acting		Judith H. Greenberg	July 13, 2011	July 2013	
7		Jon R. Lorsch	August 2013	Present	

== Research advances ==
Among the advances that scientists have made with NIGMS support are:

- Discovering a gene-silencing process called RNA interference, or RNAi, that is both a powerful research tool and a promising new approach for treating diseases.
- Revealing how a protein's shape affects its function, which plays a key role in health and disease and also informs the design of new drugs.
- Increasing survival from burn injury, in part by improving methods of wound care, nutrition and infection control.
- Shedding light on the critical functions of carbohydrates, sugar molecules found on all living cells that are vital to fertilization, inflammation, blood clotting and viral infection.
- Modeling infectious disease outbreaks and the impact of interventions through computer simulations to provide valuable information to public health policymakers.
- Developing new methods to look inside cells and other living systems. These approaches have advanced what we know about basic life processes in a range of organisms.
