= Ibenga Girls Secondary School =

School in Ibenga, Zambia

Ibenga Girls Secondary School is a Catholic girls boarding school providing secondary school education in Ibenga, south of Luanshya, Zambia. It has been described as "renowned" and "prestigious".

Ibenga Girls School was initially founded as St. Theresa's Secondary School in 1963, and run by Dominican Sisters. It later changed its name to Ibenga Secondary School. In 1994 the school's management changed, and the Dominican Sisters handed over to the Franciscan Sisters of Assisi.

== Alumnae ==
- Lindiwe Bungane, musician.
- Faith Kandaba, broadcaster.
- Christabel Mulala Mwanja, Mayor of Chililabombwe.
- Juliet Muyambo, local politician.
- Florence Mwanamakwa, Zambia's first female Sergeant-at Arms.
- Yichida Ndlovu, pilot.
- Christine Nyahoda, badminton player.
