= Susan Nakazwe =

Zambian politician

Susan Nakazwe is the former Mayor of Lusaka, Zambia. She was expelled from her position after meeting with the President of China, Hu Jintao, despite being under party instructions not to. She subsequently left the Patriotic Front party, and joined the Movement for Multi-Party Democracy party.

== Political career ==
Susan Nakazwe was named Mayor of Lusaka, the capital city of Zambia, in October 2006 while representing the Patriotic Front (PF) party. She won the poll of the members of the municipality by 31 votes to seven. This made her the second woman ever to be the Mayor of the city, while Steven Chilatu was named as her deputy. She dissolved the Movement for Multi-Party Democracy party (MMD) dominated board at the City Market, and replaced it with one led by members of the PF following accusations by her party leader who considered it "corrupt".

In March 2007, she and city councillor Boniface Musondamwaume were suspended from the PF after she was among Zambian officials who greeted President of China, Hu Jintao, at the airport when he arrived for a visit in February 2007. Nakazwe had been told by party officials to avoid any contact with Jintao, as the PF was boycotting him due to their stance against Chinese interventions in Zambia and because the president of the party had not been invited to attend.

In response, she joined the MMD. This led to accusations that the MMD had been seeking her defection all along, as three serving Zambian Mayors had been among those who had defected from the PF to the MMD over a recent period.

Preceded by Levy Mkandawire	Mayor of Lusaka; 2006 - 2007	Succeeded by Steven Chilatu
