= M. K. Mubanga =

Zambian politician

M.K. Mubanga is a member of the Pan-African Parliament representing Zambia.
