= Ompie Nkumbula-Lieventhal =

Zambian politician

Ompie Nkumbula-Liebenthal (born 8 January 1944) is a member of the Pan-African Parliament from Zambia. She sits on the Committee on Education, Science, and Technology.
