= Nina Tapula =

Zambian aviator

Ensign of the Zambian Air Force

Nina Tapula is a Zambian military aviator. In the 1990s, she became the first woman to become a military pilot in Zambia.

Tapula is a serving member of the Zambian Air Force. In 2019, Tapula was honored with the Stanbic Anakazi Women of the Year Awards Chairman's Special Award for her pioneering achievement to become the first pilot for Zambia's Air Force.

== See also ==
- Thokozile Muwamba, Zambia's first female fighter pilot
- Yichida Ndlovu, Zambia's first commercial pilot
- Women in aviation
- Timeline of women in aviation
