= Nsofwa Petronella Sampa =

Zambian HIV activist and clinical psychological counselor

Nsofwa Sampa
- Born: Nsofwa Petronella Sampa; Lusaka, Zambia
- Education: Chainama College of Health Sciences
- Occupation: Clinical psychological counselor
- Known for: HIV activism

Nsofwa Petronella Sampa is a Zambian HIV activist and clinical psychological counselor. Sampa's work focuses on working with people living with HIV and disabilities. She is a recipient of a Mandela Washington Fellowship, YALI participant and a PEPFAR beneficiary. After discovering her health status as being HIV positive, Sampa began to advocate for persons living with HIV/AIDS.

== Early life and education ==
Sampa was born in Zambia, a country which has a generalized HIV epidemic. Her father died in 1994 when she was 2 years old and her mother died in 2002 when Sampa was only 10 years old. Sampa's uncle then became her guardian, and she moved in with him. Sampa took medication every day without knowing why she was taking it or what it was for, or why her cousins living in the same house did not do the same, as the family did not discuss it. In 2003, she stumbled upon her medical file, which revealed the life-changing information that she had been diagnosed HIV positive at 3 years old, but at that time she did not ask any questions or discuss it with her relatives.

Sampa attended Mary Queen of Peace for her primary education and later was enrolled in a boarding school for her secondary education. Whilst in boarding school, a peer discovered that Sampa was on anti-retroviral (ARV) treatment. Soon the entire school was alerted and Sampa found herself stigmatised and isolated, as other students would not share a dormitory with her. She became very depressed, and discarded her medication. Her health deteriorated drastically, and she had to leave school. She developed opportunistic infections, tuberculosis and meningitis, and as a result she became blind and deaf in one ear. Sampa's aunt engaged an HIV/AIDS specialist, Mannasseh Phiri, to counsel Sampa, and it was from him that she learned that her mother had died due to HIV/AIDS-related illness, and that she herself had contracted the virus at birth. After recovering, Sampa attended Munali High School, which offered education for the visually impaired, and learned braille at the Zambia Library for the Visually Impaired. She then studied clinical and psychosocial counselling at Chainama College of Health Sciences in 2013 so that she could work with people living with HIV and disabilities.

== Career ==
Sampa is an HIV activist and clinical psychological counselor. She works with HIV-positive people to improve their status, live positively, and encourage families to discuss health issues with children. She assists those with HIV to follow treatment regimens. As of May 2019, Sampa is working on the Positive Movement project to empower people with disabilities, especially the blind. Sampa is a trained Psychosocial and Clinical Counselor who has lived with HIV for 26 years. Her blindness resulted from opportunistic infections including tuberculosis and meningitis due to poor adherence to antiretroviral therapy when she was stigmatized in school. In 2014, she received the PEPFAR Champions award for people working in the HIV field. In 2015, she received the Youth Movers Award after being nominated by the late Dr. Manasseh Phiri. She has worked with Southern African AIDS Trust as a motivational speaker and became a Mandela Washington Fellow in 2017. Sampa spoke at TEDxLusaka 2019 about stigma and adherence. She established Positive Movement to champion sexual and reproductive health rights and build an inclusive society that does not judge people based on disabilities or HIV status.

== Awards and honours ==
In 2014, she was a beneficiary of the President's Emergency Plan for AIDS Relief. In 2017, she won a Mandela Washington Fellowship from the Young African Leaders Initiative which enabled her to undertake training in civic leadership in the US.
