= Monica Musonda =

Zambian lawyer and entrepreneur (c. born 1976)

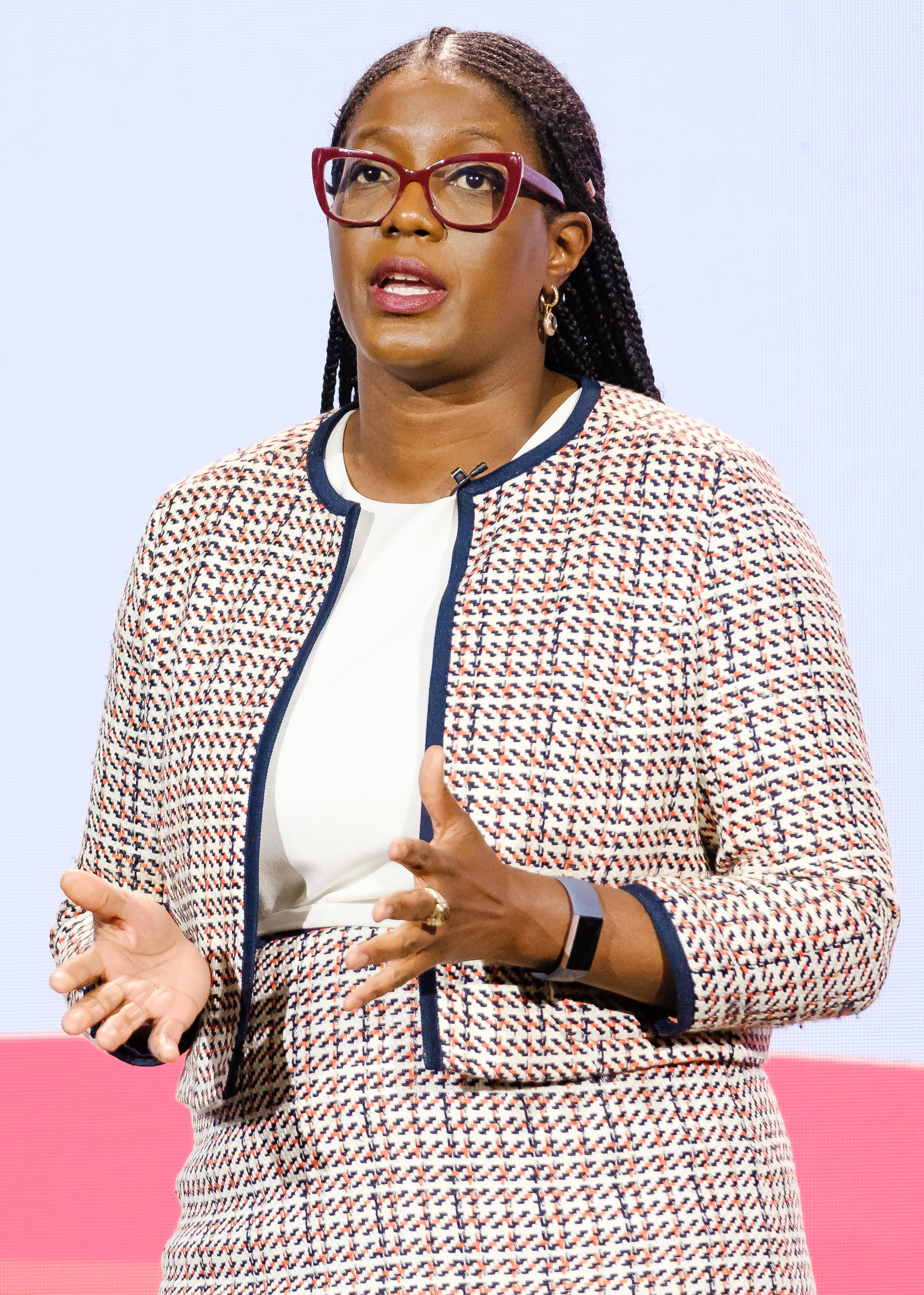
- Born: c. 1976 (age 49–50); Zambia
- Education: University of Zambia; University of London
- Occupations: Lawyer, businesswoman, entrepreneur

Monica Katebe Musonda is a Zambian businesswoman and lawyer, and the chief executive officer of Java Foods Limited.

== Background and education ==
Musonda was born in Zambia c. 1976. She holds a Bachelor of Laws degree from the University of Zambia and a Master of Laws degree from the University of London. At the time she started her food-processing business in 2012, she was described as "a dual-qualified English solicitor and Zambian advocate".

== As a lawyer ==
Musonda's legal career started in the United Kingdom, after her second degree. She was an associate attorney at Clifford Chance in London. She relocated to South Africa and was promoted to partner at Edward Nathan, in Johannesburg.

While in South Africa, she was persuaded to move to Washington, D.C., as the in-house general counsel at the International Finance Corporation, a component of the World Bank Group. While there, a position opened up at the Dangote Group in Lagos, Nigeria. She was hired as the director of legal and corporate affairs and was soon promoted to general counsel of the group.

On one of Aliko Dangote's trips to Zambia, with Mosunda in his entourage, Dangote asked her why the majority of the financial institutions and general merchants in the country were owned and operated by non-Zambians. She felt challenged and decided to start a business of her own. She resigned as General Counsel to the Dangote Group and launched Java Foods Zambia Limited.

== As a businesswoman ==
Aliko Dangote, the wealthiest person in Africa, was setting up a cement factory in Zambia. He asked Musonda who had travelled with him on the trip, why there was hardly any Zambian-owned bank, insurance company or equipment/raw material suppliers. Feeling both challenged and inspired, she resigned her corporate job and using money saved and borrowed from family and friends, she contracted a company in China to manufacture noodles with the Java Foods brand.

Four years later, she decided to expand her product line. She also decided to manufacture locally, and source the raw material within Zambia. Her next product is a "fortified instant cereal", which she refers to as "porridge". It is made from corn flour.

She enlisted the help of Partners in Food Solutions (PFS), a "consortium of leading global food companies that include" General Mills, Cargill, DSM, Bühler, Hershey and Ardent Mills. PFS engineers, business managers and food scientists from General Mills and Cargill, worked with Java Foods staff over the course of one year, pro-bono, to get the food processing plant in Zambia off the ground. The consultation provided for free, is calculated at US$50,000.

As of June 2017, Java Foods limited employed 25 full-time staff. That number had trimmed down to 19 full-time employees by 2020. The products on offer are eeZee Instant Noodles, eeZee Supa Cereal (a "fortified instant cereal"), and Num Nums corn snacks.

== Other considerations ==
Musonda was appointed a member of the CAF Governance and Ethics Committee, in July 2019. Musonda sits on the jury of the Cartier Women's Initiative. Musonda is a non-executive director of Airtel Networks Zambia Plc, Zambia Sugar Plc, and Dangote Industries Zambia Limited.

== Awards ==
- 2017 African Agribusiness Entrepreneur of the Year award
- 2018 LAB AWARDS BY THE OHNS
- 2022 BBC 100 Women
