= Alan S. Rabson =

American pathologist and cancer researcher

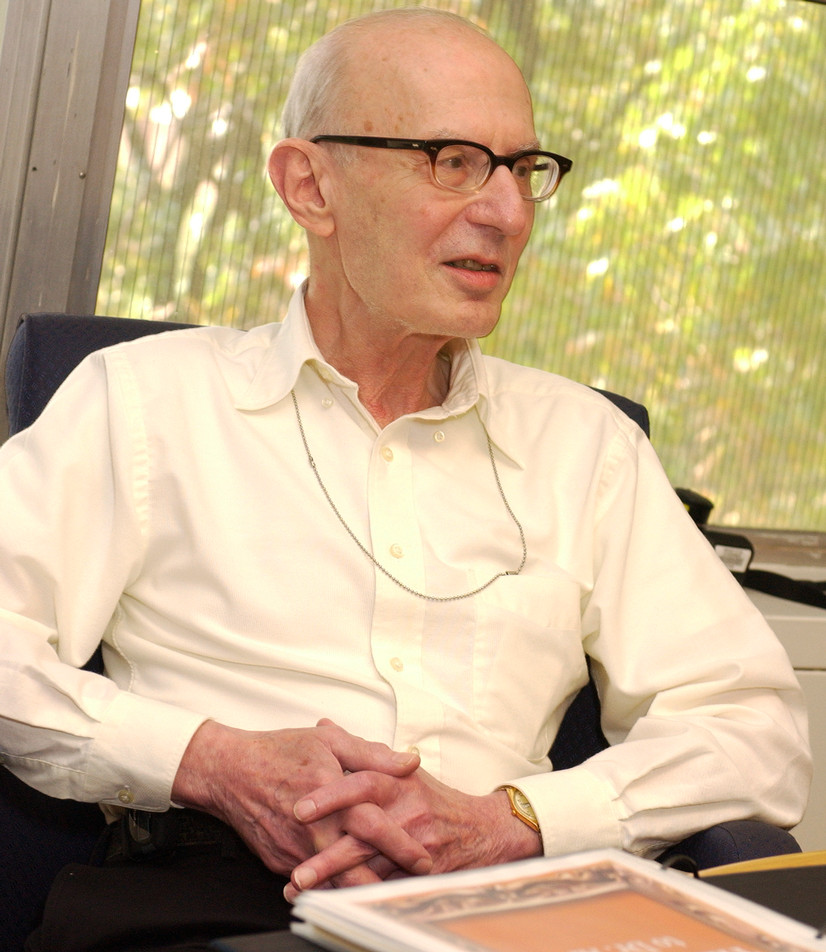
Alan Rabson in 2003

Alan S. Rabson (July 1, 1926 – July 4, 2018) was an American pathologist and cancer researcher, and was deputy director of the National Cancer Institute from 1995 to 2015.

== Early life and education ==
Born Alan Saul Rabinowitz in Brooklyn, New York on July 1, 1926, Rabson grew up in Jamaica, Queens, New York. He attended the University of Rochester as an undergraduate, and received his MD from the State University of New York.

== Career ==
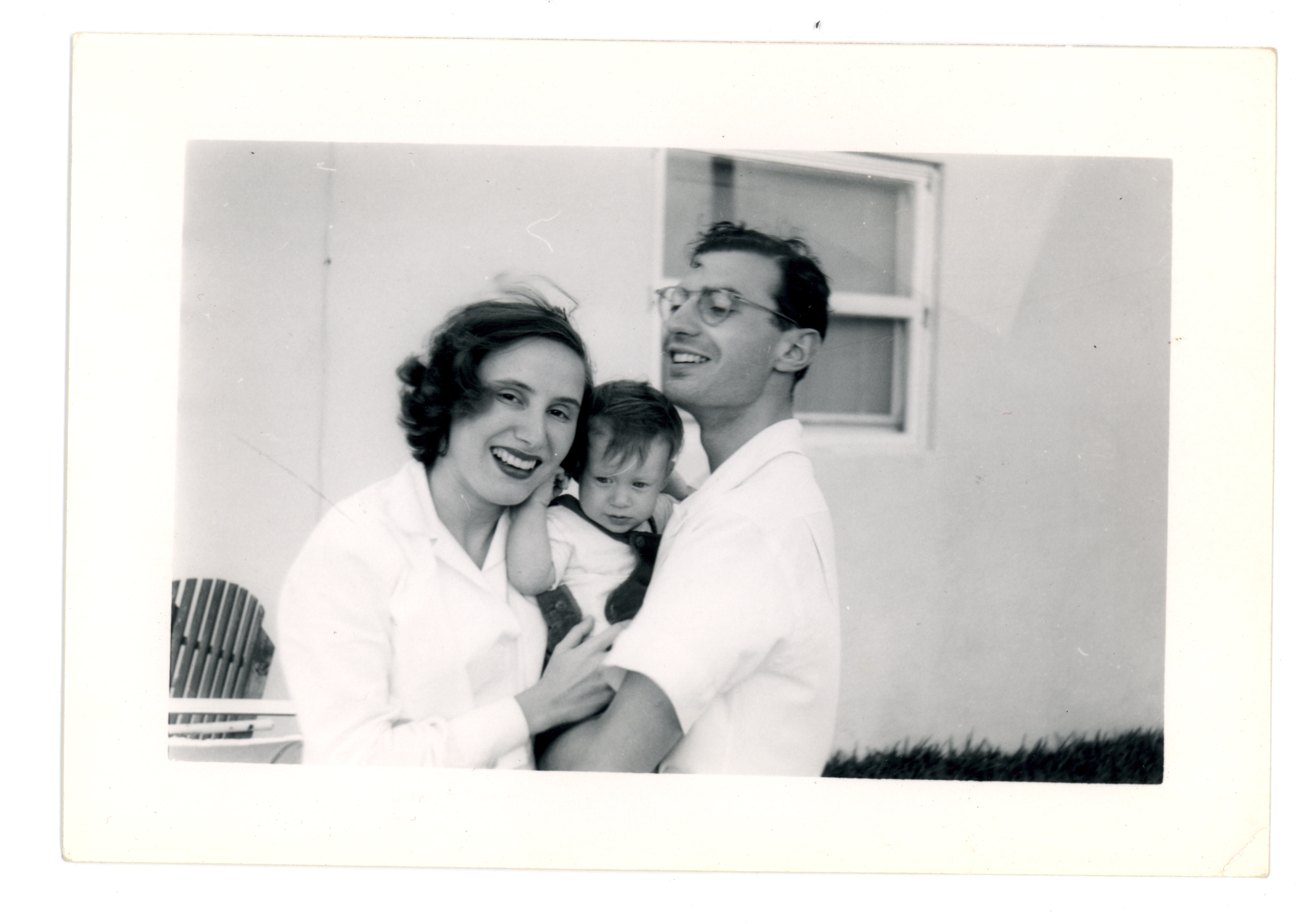
Ruth Kirschstein and Rabson with their son Arnold in 1955

Rabson joined the Public Health Service during the Korean War and studied virology at what it now the Centers for Disease Control and Prevention. He joined the National Institutes of Health in 1955 as the only pathology resident at the newly opened NIH Clinical Center. After being hired as a faculty member a year later, he began his career of studying oncoviruses. He was the director of NCI's division of cancer biology from 1975 to 1995. He then served as deputy director of the NCI from 1995 until he retired in 2015. Rabson also had appointments as an instructor at George Washington University and Georgetown University. He was an elected member of the National Academy of Medicine (Institute of Medicine).

== Personal life ==
Rabson was married to Ruth Kirschstein, a fellow pathologist at the NIH. They had one son, Arnold B. Rabson, who is also a physician. Rabson died in Skillman, New Jersey, on July 4, 2018, of vascular disease.

== Alan S. Rabson Award ==
In 2012, the NIH introduced the Alan S. Rabson Award for Clinical Care, which is given annually to NIH employees that show dedication to patient care.
