= Natasha Salifyanji Kaoma =

Zambian medical doctor (born 1992)

Natasha Kaoma
- Born: Natasha Salifyanji Kaoma; 1992 (age 33–34); Livingstone, Zambia
- Education: Bachelor of Science in human biology
- Alma mater: University of Zambia; Cambridge University
- Occupation: Medical doctor
- Years active: 2009
- Website: copperrosezambia.org

Natasha Salifyanji Kaoma (born 1992) is a Zambian medical doctor. She is best known for being the founder of Copper Rose Zambia with Faith Suwilanji Kaoma, an organisation seeking to teach women the importance of sexual and reproductive health. She is a women's health advocate and the 2017 Queen's Young Leaders Award winner. She is a member of the Royal Commonwealth Society for her work in improving the lives of Commonwealth citizens and was also nominated for the Nelson Mandela-Graca Machel youth activism award in 2016.

== Early life and education ==
Natasha Salifyanji Kaoma was born in 1992 in Livingstone, Zambia. She grew up as the sixth of seven children in a largely female household. She attended Cosmopolitan for her primary education and later went to St. Mary’s Secondary School in Lusaka, where she completed her secondary studies in 2007.

She furthered her education at the University of Zambia, where she obtained a Bachelor of Science in human biology and later pursued Bachelor of Medicine and Bachelor of Surgery (MBChB) degrees at the same institution.

== Career ==
In 2015, while studying medicine at the University of Zambia, Natasha Kaoma co-founded Copper Rose Zambia (CRZ) together with Faith Suwilanji Kaoma. The team raised approximately ZK3,000 (roughly US$300) through door to door fundraising at the campus which was used for the first outreach program at Makeni Konga Basic School. Kaoma's personal vision was to empower one million women and girls by 2022 through mentorship (self-development strategies) and awareness of sexual and reproductive health rights. By 2021, Copper Rose Zambia had reached more than 100,000 young people in Zambia through it programs.

== Awards ==
Natasha is a 2017 Queens Young Leaders award recipient and Zambian Women of the Year-Healthcare Champion for 2017.

== Personal life ==
Kaoma's family which is primarily made up of females, with her being the sixth child. She has a brother, the only male member of the family. Altogether, there are seven siblings.
