= Zambian Air Force =

Air warfare branch of Zambia's military

Zambia Air Force
- Zambia Air Force roundel
- Founded: 1964; 62 years ago
- Country: Zambia
- Type: Air force
- Role: Aerial warfare
- Part of: Zambia Defence Force
- Headquarters: Lusaka
- Mottos: "Defend and Support"

Commanders
- Commander-in-chief: Hakainde Hichilema
- Minister of Defence: Ambrose Lufuma
- ZAF Commander: Lieutenant General Oscar Nyoni
- Deputy ZAF Commander: Maj Gen Henry Chiwaya
- Notable commanders: Lieutenant General Ronnie Shikapwasha

Insignia
- Roundel

- Fin flash

Aircraft flown
- Fighter: Hongdu L-15
- Helicopter: Mil Mi-17, Bell 205, Bell 412
- Trainer: Aermacchi SF.260, Hongdu K-8, Hongdu L-15
- Transport: Harbin Y-12, Xian MA60, Alenia C-27J Spartan

The Zambia Air Force (ZAF) is the air force of Zambia and the air operations element of the Zambian Defence Force.

The primary missions of the Air Force are to defend Zambia's borders and protect its airspace. In addition, it provides various forms of air support to other government departments. It also flies reconnaissance, trooping and transport missions for the police and airlifts medical supplies and personnel to inaccessible areas. Finally, the organisation provides emergency transport whenever needed.

== History ==
Prior to the demise of the Federation of Rhodesia and Nyasaland, military air operations in the then British protectorate of Northern Rhodesia were provided by the Royal Air Force, and then the Royal Rhodesian Air Force.

The Northern Rhodesia Air Force (NRAF) was established on 1 March 1964, primarily operating in a liaison and transport role. It consisted of two squadrons:

- No. 1 Squadron NRAF operated four Douglas C-47s as well as two Percival Pembrokes.
- No. 2 Squadron NRAF operated eight De Havilland Canada DHC-2 Beavers in a liaison role.

On 24 October 1964, on the date of the establishment of the independent Republic of Zambia, the name of the Northern Rhodesia Air Force was subsequently changed to Zambian Air Force (ZAF). The early years of the ZAF saw continued close cooperation with the United Kingdom as a supplier of aircraft, and recruiting British officers still was a standard practice. Thanks to deliveries of six de Havilland Canada DHC-1 Chipmunks and other equipment, the Flying Training School was formed. These were followed by five DHC-4A Caribous. Starting in 1966, moving away from the British became a priority, and the ZAF started favouring the purchase of Italian and Yugoslavian aircraft. In this period, deliveries of Agusta-Bell AB.205s allowed for the formation of the ZAF's first helicopter squadron. Other aircraft acquired from Italy included SIAI-Marchetti SF.260s and Aermacchi MB-326GB light attack aircraft. Soko J-21 Jastrebs and Soko G-2 Galebs (two aircraft delivered in 1971) were delivered by Yugoslavia.

In the late 1970s, relations with China increased in importance. In this period, 12 Shenyang F-5s and FT-5s were delivered, as well as 12 Shenyang F-6s. In September 1980, the USSR started the deliveries of at least 16 MiG-21bis fighters and two MiG-21UM trainers.

== Zambia Air Force ranks and insignia ==
Rank	Insignia
Lance corporal	
Corporal
Sergeant
Staff Sergeant
Warrant officer II
Warrant officer l
2ND Lieutenant
Lieutenant
Captain
Major
Lieutenant Colonel
Colonel
Brigadier general
Major general
Lieutenant general
General

Source International encyclopedia of uniform Insignia

== Equipment ==
Few details are available on force deployment, but combat elements are understood to be located at Lusaka (K-8), Mbala and Mumbwa, with the small fleet of transport aircraft and utility helicopters also reportedly stationed at Lusaka. Zambia Air Force's JL-10 are equipped with PESA fire control radar along with wingtip rails for PL-5 air-to-air missiles. A 23mm gun pod can be mounted on the centreline. Four hardpoints allow for various ordnance, including 250 and 500 kg bombs, HF-18 57mm rocket pods, LS-6 guided bombs or the TL-10/YJ-9E air-to-surface missile.

=== Current inventory ===
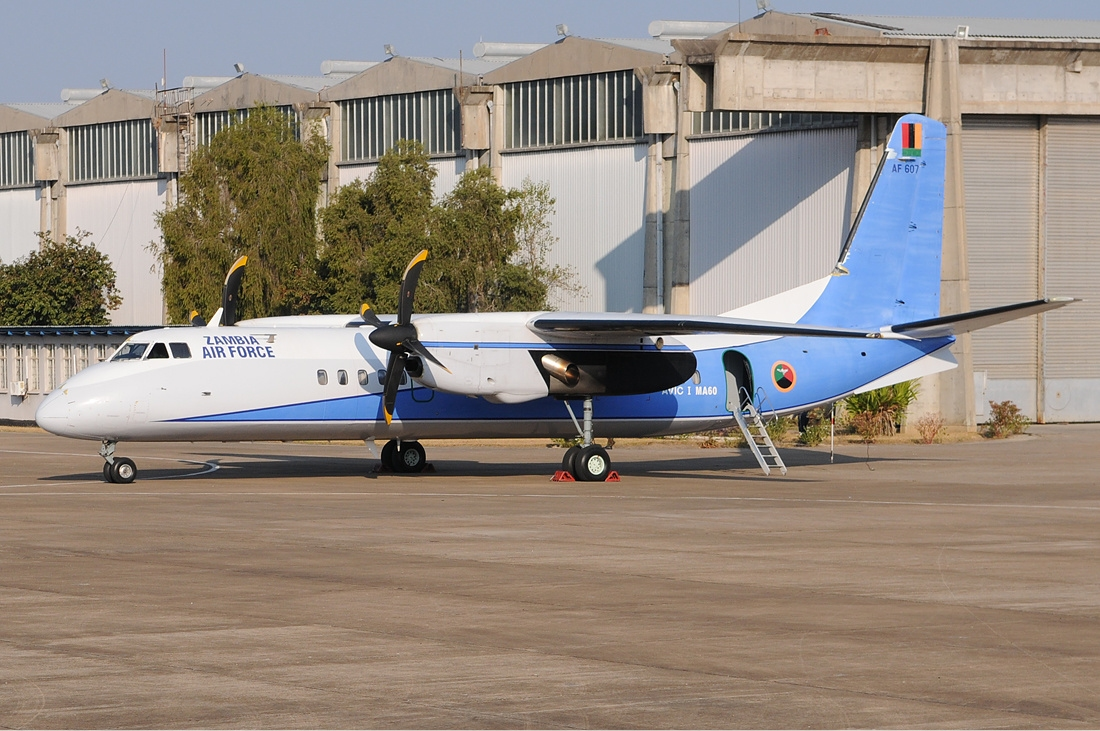
Zambian Air Force MA60

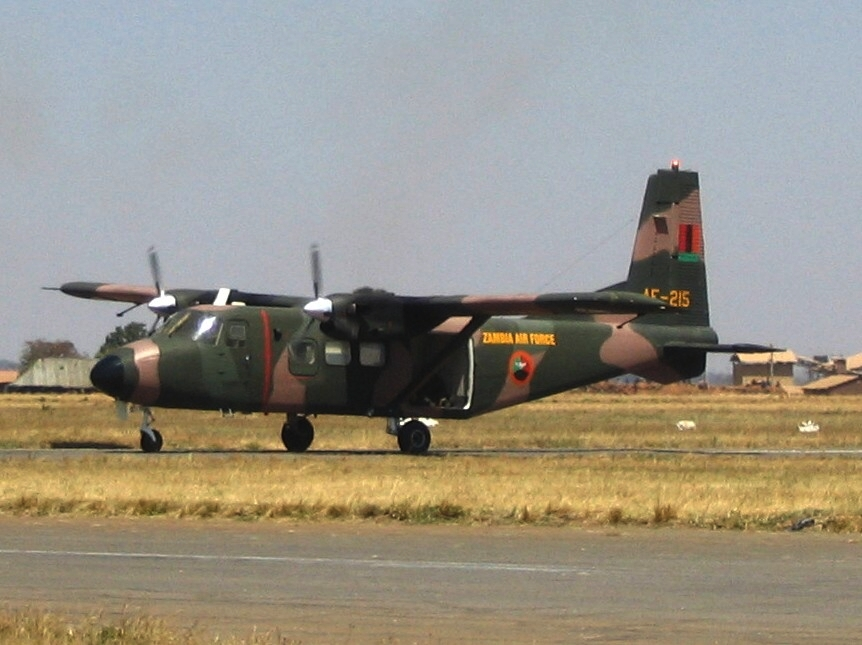
Zambian Air Force Harbin Y-12

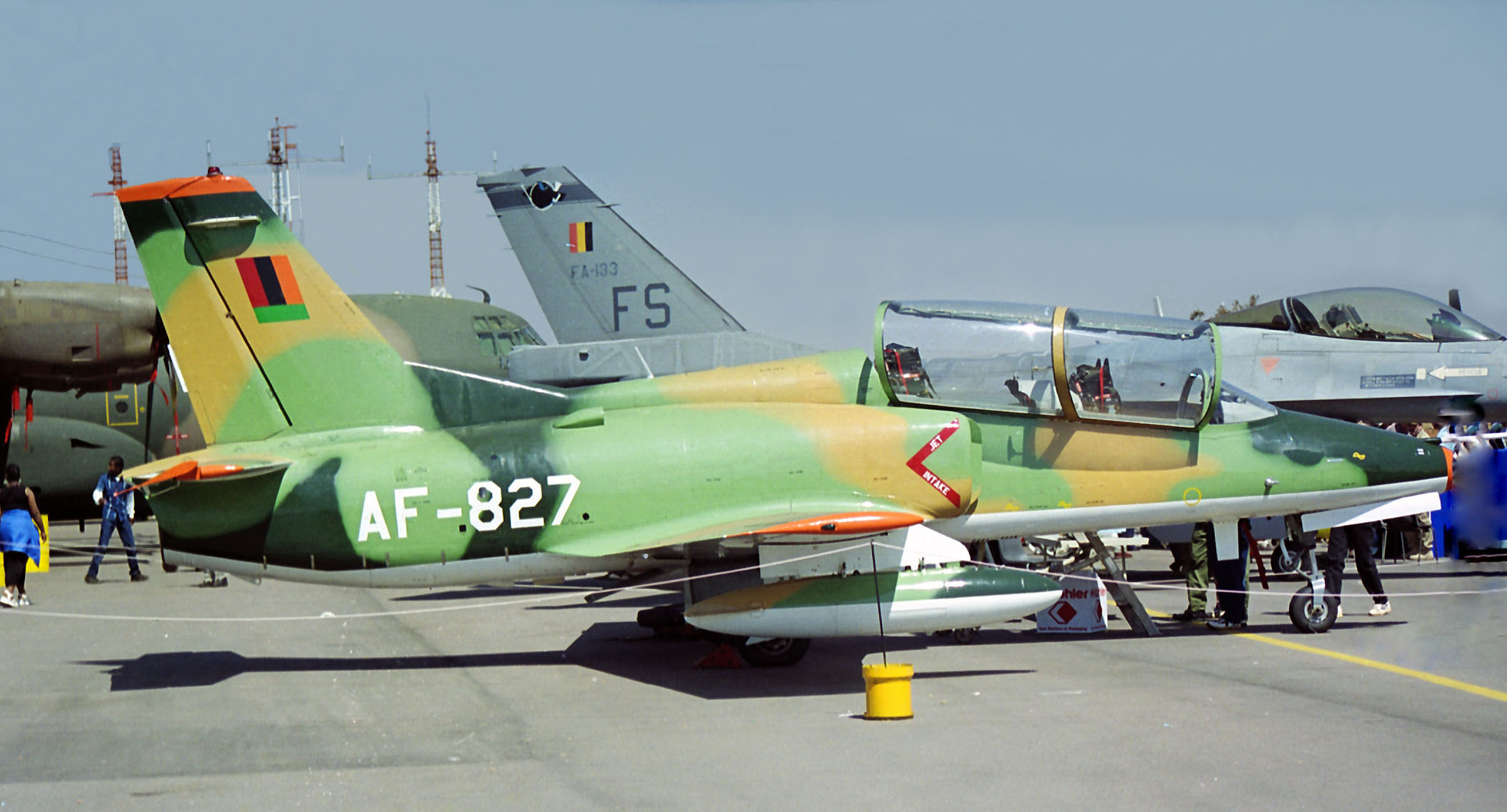
Zambian Air Force Hongdu K-8

Aircraft	Origin	Type	Variant	In service	Notes
Transport
Beech 1900	United States	Utility		1	
C-27J Spartan	Italy	Transport		2	
Cessna 208	United States	Utility		2	
Xi'an MA60	China	Transport		1	
Harbin Y-12	China	Utility		7	
Helicopters
Bell 205	United States	Utility		12	
Bell 212/Bell 412	United States / Canada	Utility/Transport		7	
Mil Mi-17	Soviet Union / Russia	Utility	Mi-171	5	
Harbin Z-9	China	Utility		7	
Trainer
Enstrom 480	United States	Trainer		2	
Hongdu JL-8	China	Jet trainer	K-8	15	
Hongdu JL-10	China	Attack / Jet trainer	L-15Z	6	
SIAI-Marchetti SF.260	Italy	Basic trainer		11	

Aircraft	Origin	Type	Variant	In service	Notes
UAV
Elbit Hermes 450	Israel	UCAV		3	

=== Retired aircraft ===
Retired aircraft include Aermacchi MB-326 (MB-326GB variant), Bell 206, De Havilland Canada DHC-1 Chipmunk, De Havilland Canada DHC-2 Beaver, De Havilland Canada DHC-4 Caribou (DHC-4A variant), Douglas C-47, MiG-21 (bis, UM variant), Percival Pembroke, Saab Safari (MFI-15 variant), Shenyang J-5 (F-5, FT-5 variant), Shenyang J-6 (F-6, FT-6 variant), Soko G-2 Galeb, Soko J-21 Jastreb.

=== Air defence systems ===
Model	Origin	Type	Variant	Number	Notes
Rapier	United Kingdom	Surface-to-air missile			
S-125	Soviet Union	Surface-to-air missile			
M-1939	Soviet Union	Anti-aircraft gun			
ZPU-4	Soviet Union	Anti-aircraft gun			
ZU-23-2	Soviet Union	Anti-aircraft gun			

== Commands ==
Commands are typically under the leadership of an Air Officer Commanding (AOC) who holds a rank of Brigadier General.

- Strike Command
- Training Command
- Tactical Air Mobility Command
- Logistics Command
- Northern Air Defence Command
- Central Air Defence Command

== Formations ==
- No. 65 Wing "Preamonitus Preamonitus "
- No. 71 Wing "Defending with valor"

== Flying units ==
- No. 1 Squadron (C-27J) "With excellence"
- No. 2 VIP Squadron
- No. 8 Squadron (K-8P) "Ready to Move"
- No. 10 Squadron "On eagle wings, we lift"
- No. 11 Squadron (Mi-171E/Sh) "Warrior spirit"
- No. 14 Squadron "Strike Command"
- No. 21 Squadron (K-8P) "Fighting vipers"
- No. 22 Squadron (Y-12)"Anytime Anywhere"
- No. 33 Squadron (Bell 212, Bell 412, Enstrom) "Service above self"
- No. 43 Squadron (L-15Z) "Poised and ready to strike"

== Training units ==
- Centre for Advanced learning "Learning for proficiency"
- Zambia Air Force Academy "To learn to defend our country"
- Technical Training School "Strive for excellency"
- Ground training School "Knowledge Efficiency"
- Flying Training School "Nihil Nisi Optima"
- Air Defence School "Excellence through knowledge"

== Leadership ==
=== Commanders ===
Rank	Name	Period
Group Captain	John Edward Kilduff	1964 - 1972
Lieutenant General	Peter Dingiswayo Zuze	1972 - 1976
Major General	Christopher Kabwe	1976 - 1980
Lieutenant General	Hannania Lungu	1980 - 1990
Lieutenant General	Herbert Simutowe	1990 - 1991
Lieutenant General	Ronnie Shikapwasha	1991 - 1997
Lieutenant General	Sande Kayumba	1997 - 2001
Lieutenant General	Christopher Singogo	2001 - 2006
Lieutenant General	Samuel Mapala	2006 - 2010
Lieutenant General	Andrew Sakala	2010 - 2011
Lieutenant General	Eric Mwaba Chimese	2011 - 2018
Lieutenant General	David Muma	2018 - 2021
Lieutenant General	Colin Barry	2021 - 2023
Lieutenant General	Oscar Nyoni	2023-

== See also ==
- Bibliography of the history of Zambia
- Nina Tapula, first woman pilot for the Zambian Air Force
- Thokozile Muwamba, Zambia's first female fighter pilot
- Yichida Ndlovu, Zambia's first commercial pilot
