= Clever Mpoha =

Zambian business executive

Clever Mpoha is a Zambian business executive who is the co-founder and Group Managing Director of Savenda Group a pan-African conglomerate. He founded the company in 1997. He started with $1000 and grew it into a $300 million company. The company name reflects his philosophy and stands for SAVE Nations Develop Africa.
