= Mpezeni IV =

Ngoni king

Mphezeni IV ('Inyandezulu Inkosi Yamakhosi Mphezeni KaZwangendaba; born David Njengembaso kaKhuzwayo kaXilowa; 20 March 1956 – 30 May 2026) was paramount chief of the Ngoni people of Eastern Province, Zambia. He was the fourth monarch of the Mphezeni dynasty and a direct descendant of Mpezeni I, the nineteenth-century Ngoni warrior king who resisted British colonial expansion. Mpezeni IV ascended to the throne in 1982 following the death of his father, Mpezeni III (Khuzwayo Pontino kaXilowa), and ruled for approximately 44 years, making him one of the longest-serving traditional rulers in Zambia. King of the Ngoni people of Eastern Province, East Africa and Malawi's Mchinji.

== Early life and family background ==
David Njengembazo Jele was born in Eastern Province, Northern Rhodesia (present-day Zambia), into the Jele (Jere) royal house of the Ngoni people. The Jele royal lineage traces its ancestry to Zwangendaba kaHlatshwayo, the nineteenth-century Ngoni leader who led the migration of Ngoni peoples from southern Africa into present-day Zambia, Malawi, Tanzania and Mozambique.

He was a son of Paramount Chief Khuzwayo Pontino (Pontiano) Jele, who ruled as Mpezeni III, and Ndlunkulu Tilekane of the Nzima clan from Nyalongo Village in the area of Chief Maguya. Through his paternal line, he descended from Prince Jele kaMfeka of the Ncwangeni Nguni family, while his maternal ancestry included connections to the Ndwandwe royal house associated with King Zwide.

Within Ngoni tradition, his birthright title was Inyandezulu, and he was recognized as Inkosi YaMakhosi ("King of Kings"), the traditional sovereign title of the Ngoni monarch. The title "Paramount Chief" became the official colonial and post-colonial designation for the office following the defeat of King Mpezeni I by the British South Africa Company in 1898.

Njengembazo spent part of his early life in Efeni Village near Chipata and later worked in Livingstone before succeeding to the throne.

== Ascension to the throne ==
Following the death of his father in June 1981, Jele succeeded to the Ngoni throne after the customary mourning period and was formally installed as Paramount Chief on 19 June 1982. Upon his accession, he became the custodian of a traditional governance structure comprising numerous subordinate chiefs (Amakhosi) organized into regional divisions known as Izigodi, referred to in Zambia as Mibaya (singular: Chibaya).

He assumed the royal title Mpezeni IV and became the fourth ruler in the Mpezeni line to bear the title. His coronation at Ephendukeni Palace was attended by Zambia’s founding President Kenneth Kaunda and Paramount Chief M’Mbelwa III of Malawi.

== Title controversy ==
Prince Gumbi Kaziguda Jele argued that this title is foreign and demeaning as compared to Inkosi Yamakhosi or King.

Most awakened Ngonis have rejected the title 'Paramount Chief', noting that foreign laws cannot supersede Ngoni customs and laws. More and more Ngonis are calling on the Zambian Government to replace it with Inkosi Yamakhosi.

== Reign ==
Mpezeni IV ruled for approximately forty-four years and was widely regarded as a custodian of Ngoni culture and heritage.

During his reign, he transformed the Ncwala Ceremony into one of Zambia's largest and most prominent traditional ceremonies, attracting thousands of participants, government leaders, diplomats, and visitors from across Africa.

He maintained strong cultural links with Ngoni communities in Malawi, Mozambique, Tanzania and South Africa and was noted as the first Mpezeni ruler to return to the ancestral homeland of the Ngoni in South Africa.

Mpezeni IV served during the administrations of Presidents Kenneth Kaunda, Frederick Chiluba, Levy Mwanawasa, Rupiah Banda, Michael Sata, Edgar Lungu, and Hakainde Hichilema.

== Death ==
Mpezeni IV died on 30 May 2026 at the age of 75 while receiving treatment in Lusaka.

His death was confirmed by Senior Chief Nzamane IV of the Ngoni Royal Establishment. Tributes were paid by President Hakainde Hichilema, government officials, traditional leaders, and members of the public, who described him as a unifying figure and a defender of Zambia’s cultural heritage.

== Legacy ==
Mpezeni IV is remembered for preserving Ngoni traditions and strengthening the visibility of the Ncwala Ceremony both nationally and internationally.

His reign provided continuity to the Ngoni royal establishment and strengthened cultural ties among Ngoni communities across Southern, Central and Eastern Africa.

== Dynasty ==
The Kingdom was founded by King uJzwangendaba KaHlwatshwayo, leader of the Jele clan of the Hluhluwe area in South Africa. King Zwangendaba was born in the St. Lucia Bay area in 1777. His mother was from the Nzima clan. He took over as the King of the Jeles when he was aged 35.

He first married Ndwandwe Princesses Loziwawa and Soseya whom he placed in his village of Ekuveleleni (also Emveyweyeni). Ekuveleleni means 'a place of prominence'. He later married another 65+ wives and fathered more than 200 children. King uZwangendaba was from a different Nguni group. His father was King Hlatshwayo, who reigned from eLangeni royal village in the North of Zulu Land. King Hlatshwayo was a son of King Magaganta. Their lineage is from King Mcwango of the Ncwangeni umbrella.

When the Ncwangeni settled on this coastal land, the Mkhwanazi, Mthethwa, Msweli and Mcambi clans had not yet arrived and other Ncwangeni clans such as the Phakathi, Mzimela and Msane among others had not yet emerged. King Mfekaye instructed his first son in iKhohlo (Junior house) Prince Jele kaMfekaye to establish himself in the St Lucia area and lead the Ncwangeni section in that part of the Kingdom. Those people became known as abakwaJele, the people of Jele. King Jele kaMfeka (also Nkabaluthuli) begot King Nguboyengwe who begot King Dlomo who begot King Nonyanda who begot King Mangangatha who begot King Hlatshwayo who begot King Zwangendaba and King Somkhanda. King Zwangendaba led an exodus that established the BaNgoni Kingdoms in Zambia and Malawi, with King Somkhanda (Gumbi) returning to the Mkhuze area to establish the Gumbi kingdom.

The group is named for Ngoni warrior-king Mphezeni (also Mpeseni). That kind gathered over 4000 warriors in 1897 to attack the British who were taking control of Nyasaland and North-Eastern Rhodesia, and was defeated. He signed a treaty that allowed him to rule as Paramount Chief.

== Chronology ==
- King uJzwangendaba KaHlatshwayo - (1815–1845)
- Inkosana Ntabeni KaHlatshwayo-Regency (1845–1847)
- Mphezeni I KaZwangendaba (1848–1900)
- King Xilowa (Mphezeni II) KaNsingo (1900-1941).
- King Khuzwayo Pontino (Mphezeni III) KaXilowa (1941-1981).
- King Njengembaso (Mphezeni IV) kaKhuzwayo (1982-30 May, 2026) : latest reigning King and Royal Patriarch of all Jele Royal Houses.
