= Rabson Mucheleng'anga =

Zambian footballer (born 1989)

Rabson Mucheleng'anga (born 14 September 1989) is a Zambian football goalkeeper and plays for Nchanga Rangers F.C. in the Zambian Premier League. He formerly played for Power Dynamos FC.

== International career ==
While still young, he is a regular on the Zambia national team, second choice only to George Kolala. and is also former U-20 national player.
