= Patrick Chikusu =

Zambian Politician

Patrick Mwewa Anthony Chikusu (12 January 1951 – 2 December 2013) was a Zambian politician who served as member of the National Assembly for Katuba constituency under the Movement for Multi-Party Democracy (MMD). At the time of his death Chikusu served as Deputy Minister of Health in the Republic of Zambia.

== Early life and education ==
Patrick Mwewa Anthony Chikusu was born on 12 January 1951 in Northern Rhodesia (now Zambia). Chikusu obtained a bachelor's degree in pharmacy in 1974 from University of Ife in Nigeria. He earned a master of Science degree in pharmacy in 1979 from Leeds University in the United Kingdom. In 1983, he earned a doctor of Philosophy (PhD) from the University of Strathclyde in Glasgow, United Kingdom.

== Career ==
Chikusu was a pharmacist by profession and began his career working as the pharmacist in charge with the Ministry of Health between 1974 and 1975. Between 1975 and 1978, he worked as General Manager at General Pharmaceuticals Limited before he was appointed managing director for Medical Stores Limited from 1983 to 1993. From 1993 to 1997 Chikusu, worked as the Director of Pharmaceutical Services at the Ministry of Health Headquarters. In addition, he worked as a lecturer in human biology at the University of Zambia (UNZA). Between 2004 and 2005 Chikusu was involved in conducting research on the use of herbal remedies in the treatment of HIV/ AIDS. He served as principal investigator of clinical trials of traditional herbal remedies under National Aids Council. Chikusu also served as the Chairman of the Lusaka Cancer Centre, a centre involved in prognosis, treatment, palliative care and research in oncology.

In 2011 Chikusa was elected as Member of Parliament MP for Katuba constituency under the Movement for Multi-Party Democracy (MMD). Despite being a Member of the Opposition, Chikusu was appointed to serve as Deputy Minister of Health by President Michael Sata in 2012.

== Death ==
Chikusu died on 2 December 2013 in South Africa. He suffered a heart attack and was later evacuated to South Africa's Milpark Hospital to receive specialist treatment. Prior to his evacuation Chikusu was admitted to a local hospital for a heart problem.
