= Yichida Ndlovu =

Zambian aviator

Yichida Ndlovu is the first female to become a commercial pilot in Zambia.

== Education ==
After completing her secondary school education at Ibenga Girls in 1976, in 1977 she gained admission to the School of Natural Sciences at the University of Zambia. Prior to that, she underwent a six-month training at the Zambia National Service youth training programme.

== Career ==
She was first employed as a pilot at Roan Air in 1981. She worked there till 1991, before joining the Zambian government. As of 2013, she is known to be working for the Ministry of Communications, Transport, Works and Supply, where she has been seconded to the Zambia Flying Doctor Service in Ndola.

== Personal life ==
She is married to Enock Ndlovu, and is a mother of three children.

== See also ==
- Nina Tapula, Zambia's first female military pilot, Captain in the Zambian Air Force
- Besa Mumba, Zambia's youngest female commercial pilot
