= Abel Kanyamuna =

Zambian footballer (born 2002)

Personal information
- Date of birth: 10 June 2002 (age 24)
- Place of birth: Zambia
- Position: Midfielder

Team information
- Current team: Trofense

Youth career
- Pistoiese
- –2020: Cagliari

Senior career*
Years	Team	Apps	(Gls)
2021–	Trofense	2	(0)
- * Club domestic league appearances and goals

Abel Kanyamuna (born 10 June 2002) is a Zambian footballer who plays as a midfielder for Trofense.

== Career ==
As a youth player, Kanyamuna joined the youth academy of Italian third division side Pistoiese, becoming the first Zambian to play in Italy. After that, he joined the youth academy of Italian Serie A club Cagliari. Before the second half of 2020–21, he signed for Trofense in the Portuguese third division. On 14 March 2021, Kanyamuna debuted for Trofense during a 1–0 win over Amarante.
