= Roy McCallum (rugby union) =

South African rugby union footballer

- Born: Roy James McCallum; 12 April 1946 (age 80) Kitwe, Northern Rhodesia
- Height: 1.75 m (5 ft 9 in)
- Weight: 75 kg (165 lb)
- School: Rondebosch Boys' High School
- University: University of Cape Town
- Notable relative: Ian McCallum

Rugby union career
Amateur team(s)
Years	Team	Apps	(Points)
- Ikeys
- Villagers RFC
Provincial / State sides
Years	Team	Apps	(Points)
1972–1981	Western Province		
International career
Years	Team	Apps	(Points)
1974	South Africa	1	

Roy James McCallum (born 12 April 1946) is a former South African rugby union player.

== Playing career ==
McCallum, like his older brother Ian, matriculated at Rondebosch Boys' High School in Cape Town and attended the University of Cape Town. However, he first spent two years at Stellenbosch University before moving to UCT in 1967. While at Stellenbosch, he played for the University's under–19 A team and at UCT he played for their first team. In 1968, he went to Palmer College of Chiropractic in the United States to qualify as a chiropractor. He returned to South Africa and made his provincial debut for Western Province in 1972.

McCallum played only one test for the Springboks, the first test against the 1974 British Lions at Newlands in Cape Town and in his debut test, his brother was playing fullback. At the end of 1974 he toured with the Springboks to France, playing in four tour matches, scoring one try for the Springboks.

=== Test history ===
No.	Opponents	Results (RSA 1st)	Position	Tries	Dates	Venue
1.	British Lions	3–12	Scrumhalf		8 June 1974	Newlands, Cape Town

== See also ==
- List of South Africa national rugby union players – Springbok no. 462
