= Susan Mulikita =

Zambian law practitioner and business woman

Susan M’kandawire Mulikita
- Born: Zambia
- Education: University of Zambia; Buckinghamshire New University
- Occupations: Law practitioner, business executive
- Known for: First female CEO of Liquid Telecom Zambia
- Title: Independent Non-Executive Director at Zambia Sugar PLC
- Children: 4

Susan M’kandawire Mulikita is a Zambian Law practitioner and business woman. She is known to be the first female to be appointed Chief Executive Officer of Liquid Telecom Group in Zambia.

== Early years and education ==
Mulikita attended the University of Zambia, where she graduated with a Bachelor of Law degree. She then proceeded to obtain a Master of Law in ICT from the Buckinghamshire New University in the United Kingdom. She is a qualified practitioner of Telecoms/ICT Policy, Law, Regulation and Management.

== Career ==
On 14 January 2019, Mulikita joined Liquid Telecom Group serving on Liquid Telecom’s Southern Africa regional executive leadership team. She later became the first woman to be appointed Chief Executive Officer of the company. Prior to that, In January 2012, she worked at Airtel serving as regulatory director, responsible for telecommunications and ICT law, policy, regulation and stakeholder management. She also worked at the Zambia ICT Authority, serving as the legal and regulatory director from January 2001 to December 2011.

== Personal life ==
She is a mother of four children.
