= Oscar Nyoni =

Zambian military personnel

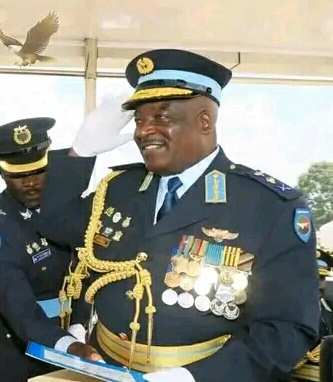
- Oscar Nyoni November, 2023.
- Born: Oscar Msitu Nyoni; January 25, 1965; Lusaka, Zambia
- Military career
- Allegiance: Zambia
- Branch: Zambia Air Force
- Service years: 1988 – Present
- Rank: Lieutenant General
Military offices
Preceded by Lieutenant General Colin Barry	Commander of the Zambia Air Force; 2023 - Present

Lieutenant General Oscar Msitu Nyoni is a Zambian military officer and has been force commander of the Zambia Air Force since December 20, 2023.

== Career ==
Oscar Nyoni, on August 29, 2021, was appointed as Deputy Commander and Chief of staff of the Zambia Air force by President Hakainde Hichilema.

On December 20, 2023, President Hichilema promoted Oscar to the rank of Lieutenant General and appointed him to succeed Colin Barry as Commander of the Zambia Air Force after the President fired him from office.
