= Saviour Chibiya =

Zambian banker and corporate executive

- Born: c. 1971 (age 54–55); Zambia
- Citizenship: Zambia
- Education: University of Zambia
- Occupations: Banker and Corporate Executive
- Years active: since 1993
- Known for: Professional competence
- Title: Group Executive Absa Regional Operations (ARO) Absa Group Limited

Saviour Chibiya, is a Zambian economist and corporate executive, who is the group executive for regional operations at Absa Group Limited, effective November 2021. In this position, he is a member of the group executive committee. He reports directly to the group CEO of Absa Group. He is based at the group headquarters, in Johannesburg, South Africa.

Before his current position, Chibiya was the Regional Managing Director for the Absa operations in Botswana, Mozambique, Seychelles, Tanzania, Uganda. He has a long banking career going back nearly three decades, including 18 years spent at Citibank, in several African countries.

== Background and education ==
Chibiya was born in Zambia in the late 1971. He attended local primary and secondary schools, before being admitted to the University of Zambia, graduating in 1992, with a Bachelor of Arts degree in Economics. He is a Fellow of the Zambia Institute of Banking and Financial Services.

== Career ==
At the time he was appointed to his current position in 2021, he was the Regional Managing Director of six Absa subsidiary banks in five sub-Saharan countries, having served in that position since 2019. Before that, he was the Regional Managing Director at Barclays Africa Group, responsible for Barclays operations outside South Africa, serving there between 2017 and 2019.

Chibiya was hired by Barclays Africa Group in 2010 as CEO and managing director of Barclays Bank Zambia Plc (today Absa Bank Zambia Plc). He was replaced as CEO by Mizinga Melu, another seasoned Zambian banker.

Before joining Barclays, Chibiya was at Citibank, for nearly two decades, starting out as an executive trainee in 1993 and progressively rising to country representative for Citibank N.A. in Ghana in 2003 and subsequently managing director & CEO of Citibank Zambia Limited in 2006. He also served as chairman of the Bankers Association of Zambia from 2008 to 2011

== See also ==
- Absa Group
- List of banks in Zambia
