= Arnold B. Rabson =

U.S. physician-scientist

Arnold B. Rabson is an American physician-scientist. He is the director of the Child Health Institute of New Jersey and the Laura Gallagher Chair of Developmental Biology at Robert Wood Johnson Medical School. Rabson is a Fellow of the American Association for the Advancement of Science.

== Early life and education ==
Arnold B. Rabson was born to scientists Ruth L. Kirschstein and Alan S. Rabson. He was raised on the National Institutes of Health campus where his parents worked. Rabson completed a medical degree at Brown University. He moved to Harvard Medical School where he conducted his residency training in anatomic pathology at Brigham and Women's Hospital and pediatric pathology at Boston Children's Hospital.

== Career ==
Rabson researched molecular biology and the pathogenesis of HIV/AIDS and cancer at the National Institutes of Health, where he completed postdoctoral fellowship in the Laboratory of Molecular Microbiology at the National Institute of Allergy and Infectious Diseases, working with Dr. Malcolm Martin and Dr. Anthony S. Fauci and also began his own independent research career. His laboratory investigated NF-kappaB transcription factors in regulating HIV. In 1990, Rabson began at the Robert Wood Johnson Medical School as a resident member of the Center for Advanced Biotechnology and Medicine. His laboratory has studied the molecular pathogenesis of human retroviral infections leading to the discoveries of the roles of NF-kappaB pathways in activation of latent HIV, as well as in the pathogenesis of human lymphomas. He has also discovered pathways responsible for activation of latent infection by the Human T Cell Leukemia/Lymphoma Virus Type 1 (HTLV-1). Rabson helped found the Transcriptional Regulation and Oncogenesis Program at Rutgers Cancer Institute of New Jersey. In 1997, he became the associate director of the Cancer Institute for Basic Sciences. In 2002, Rabson founded the division of Cancer Genomics and Molecular Oncology at the Cancer Institute. In 2005, he was appointed the deputy director of Cancer Institute. He became the interim director of the Child Health Institute of New Jersey in 2007 and was appointed as the permanent director in 2009. Rabson is the Laura Gallagher Chair of Developmental Biology and a professor of pharmacology, pediatrics, pathology, and laboratory medicine at Robert Wood Johnson Medical School.

== Awards and honors ==
Rabson was elected as a Fellow of the American Association for the Advancement of Science in 2017.

== Personal life ==
Rabson is married to Barbara Barnett and they have a daughter and two grandchildren.
