= Thokozile Muwamba =

Zambian aviator

Thokozile Muwamba (born 1993) is a Zambian pilot. In 2017, she became the first female fighter pilot in Zambia. In her first year of study at Zambia's Copperbelt University, she quit to join the country's military in 2012. A few years later, she became a beneficiary of a Zambia Air Force project to introduce females into the male dominated field in 2015. She currently holds the rank of second lieutenant in the Zambia Air Force.
