= Chibesa Kankasa =

Zambian freedom fighter and politician

Chibesa Chibesakunda Kankasa, often known as Mama Kankasa (1936–2018) was a Zambian freedom fighter and politician.

== Life ==
Chibesa Chibesakunda Kankasa was born on 23 March 1936 at Lubwa Mission in Chinsali. She was the sixth child of Yotam Chibesakunda, a carpenter, and Chilufya Mununga Mutale Chibwe. She had 10 siblings, including Jackson Ng'ona Chibesakunda, Jericho Ng'ona Chibesakunda, Smart Yasa Ng'ona Chibesakunda, Margaret Chibesakunda, Chanda Chibesakunda, Kunda Chibesakunda and Friday Ng'ona Chibesakunda. In 1941 her parents moved to Chalimbana, and later to Kitwe. She attended Mingolo Girls Boarding School, and later studied to become a social worker, specialising in matrimonial and juvenile delinquency cases. She worked as a social worker from 1951 to 1961.

She married Timothy Kansasa in 1952. As she later recalled:

My husband and I used to host freedom fighters at our house when he was working for the mines in Kitwe. I used to cook for all of them, Dr Kenneth Kaunda and others, and so they started referring to me as the National Cook.

Kansasa became chairperson of the Women's League within the United National Independence Party (UNIP). In 1972 she was appointed to the Central Committee of UNIP. She was the first woman to be a member of the Central Committee.

Active in working for women's rights, she has been credited by her contemporary Betty Chilunga for the introduction of paid maternity leave to working mothers, and for pushing the Zambian government to begin commemorating International Women's Day.

Kansasa was the first Zambian High Commissioner to Kenya. She was in that post in 1991, when UNIP was ousted from power. She was recalled six months later, and retired from active politics.

In 2002 Kankasa was awarded the Order of the Eagle of Zambia, Second Division. She died at Avrwyp Hospital in Johannesburg, South Africa on 29 October 2018. President Edgar Lungu awarded her a state funeral, and declared Saturday 3 November a day of national mourning.
