= George Kolala =

Zambian footballer (born 1976)

Personal information
- Date of birth: 3 March 1976 (age 50)
- Position: Goalkeeper

Senior career*
Years	Team	Apps	(Gls)
1999–2003	Zamsure F.C.		
2004–2007	Zanaco F.C.		

International career
2000–2007	Zambia	14	(0)
- * Club domestic league appearances and goals

George Kolala (born 3 March 1976) is a Zambian retired football goalkeeper. He was a squad member for the 2006 Africa Cup of Nations.
