= Ian McCallum (rugby union) =

South African rugby union player

- Born: Ian Duncan McCallum; 3 July 1944 (age 82) Kitwe, Northern Rhodesia
- Height: 1.80 m (5 ft 11 in)
- Weight: 169 lb (77 kg)
- School: Rondebosch Boys' High School
- University: University of Cape Town
- Notable relative: Roy McCallum (brother)

Rugby union career
- Position: Fullback
Provincial / State sides
Years	Team	Apps	(Points)
1968–1972	Western Province		
International career
Years	Team	Apps	(Points)
1970–74	South Africa	11	(62)

Official website
- http://ian-mccallum.co.za

Ian McCallum (born 1944) is a former rugby union player. From 1970 to 1974, he played 11 matches as fullback for the Springboks, the South African national rugby union team.

After his playing career, he became a psychiatrist, author and wilderness guide, and co-founder of the Wilderness Leadership School in the Western Cape, South Africa.

== Rugby career ==
McCallum played provincial rugby for Western Province from 1968 until 1972. He then moved to Natal and though he never played for Natal, he was selected for South Africa during the 1974 season.

McCallum's first test for the Springboks was in 1970 against the New Zealand at Loftus Versfeld in Pretoria. He played in all four tests in the 1970 series against the touring All Blacks. He also played in the test series against France and Australia in 1971 and against the British Lions in 1974. Both he and his brother, Roy, were in the Springbok team for the first Test against the British Lions at Newlands in 1974. McCallum played a further six tour matches, scoring seventy-two points for the Springboks.

=== Test history ===
No.	Opposition	Result (SA 1st)	Position	Points	Date	Venue
1.	New Zealand	17–6	Fullback	8 (1 conversion, 2 penalties)	25 July 1970	Loftus Versfeld, Pretoria
2.	New Zealand	8–9	Fullback	5 (1 conversion, 1 penalties)	8 August 1970	Newlands, Cape Town
3.	New Zealand	14–3	Fullback	8 (1 conversion, 2 penalties)	29 August 1970	Boet Erasmus Stadium, Port Elizabeth
4.	New Zealand	20–17	Fullback	14 (1 conversion, 4 penalties)	12 September 1970	Ellis Park, Johannesburg
5.	France	22–9	Fullback	13 (2 conversion, 3 penalties)	12 June 1971	Free State Stadium, Bloemfontein
6.	France	8–8	Fullback	2 (1 conversion)	19 June 1971	Kings Park, Durban
7.	Australia	19–11	Fullback	7 (2 conversion, 1 penalties)	17 July 1971	Sydney Cricket Ground, Sydney
8.	Australia	14–6	Fullback	5 (1 conversion, 1 penalties)	31 July 1971	Brisbane Exhibition Ground, Brisbane
9.	Australia	18–6	Fullback		7 August 1971	Sydney Cricket Ground, Sydney
10.	British Lions	3–12	Fullback		8 June 1974	Newlands, Cape Town
11.	(British & Irish Lions) British Lions	9–28	Fullback		22 June 1974	Loftus Versfeld, Pretoria

== See also ==
- List of South Africa national rugby union players – Springbok no. 443
