= Mwene Chitengi Chiyengele =

Mbunda king

Mwene Chitengi Chiyengele was a Mbunda king who led his people from south-eastern Angola to Barotseland in western Zambia around 1824. The Mbunda were skilled game hunters and fighters using bow and arrow. They were welcomed by King Mulambwa of the Aluyi of Barotseland, now Western Zambia.

== Early life ==
Prince Munamwene Chitengi Chiyengele was a son of King Mwene Chingumbe with his Queen, Chieftainess Kakuhu of Musholo. King Chingumbe was born along the banks of the Mithimoyi, a tributary of the Luena river at the Upper Zambezi. His father was Consort Mushinge and his mother was Chieftainess Chioola. King Chingumbe was made King of the Mbunda ya Mathzi at Lilembalemba along the banks of Lukonya river after the death of his elder brother King Yambayamba Kapanda. His wife was Lishano Kakuhu. His prime minister was Nkombwe Lilema and his court president was Nobleman (Mwata) Likupekupe. His children were: Prince Chitengi, Prince Yembe Katete, Prince Mpili, Prince Nkombwe Kapamuka and Prince Kakuhu.

King Chingumbe ruled very well and eventually gave the part of his kingdom known as Mikuyu to his son Chief Chitengi Chingumbe Chiyengele to rule from his palace known as Londe.

== Succession ==
Chief Mwene Chitengi Chingumbe Chiyengele succeeded his father King Chingumbe as the 15th Mbunda monarch upon the deceased's decree, but because of the earlier decree of nephew successors only, the Mbunda schemed to remove him.

The nephews of the late King Mwene Chingumbe, Prince Munamwene Ngonga and Prince Munamwene Nyumbu Luputa thought of a way to nullify the choice of the King Mwene Chitengi, to succeed his father. King Mwene Chitengi went back to his palace (nganda) in Mikuyu a disappointed man and immediately after his departure Prince Munamwene Ngonga, his cousin, was made King instead. King Ngonga I Chiteta ruled only for a very short period and died. Before the burial, as they were looking for the candidate to be buried together with King Ngonga I Chiteta, his subordinates went to look for someone from the now Chief Chitengi Chingumbe Chiyengele's area and" captured his Chikola (Gester) called Kapango ka Vilondo. This displeased Chief Chitengi Chingumbe Chiyengele who gathered his advisors and informed them of the two instances about his mother's implication and the captivity of his Gester by the same people who disliked him. His advisors suggested it would be better to maybe leave Mbundaland for a safer place where his enemies would not feel threatened by his presence.

The only place that was safe for him to settle was Bulozi since a covenant had already been made and King Ngombala had sworn that the Aluyi would never go to war with the Mbunda, when Ngombala was fighting these tribes: the Nanzwa (in northern Zimbabwe), the Subiya (in the Caprivi Strip), Vafwe, the Yeyi (both of whom are unknown today), the Mashi (along the Mashi river also sometimes called the Kwandu or Linyanti rivers, the Imilangu, the Nyengo and the Makoma who are all located in Kalabo District today, but declared an alliance with the Mbunda. There was such a strong and deep bond of friendship between the Aluyi and the Mbunda that Chief Chitengi Chingumbe Chiyengele thought of migrating to Bulozi.

== Migration ==
In frustration he migrated to Barotseland in the now Zambia in 1824. On arrival, Chief Mwene Chitengi Chiyengele sent his messenger Nobleman Mwata Kamana Vushoko who was the younger brother to Chief Mwene Mundu (the first Mbunda chief to migrate to Barotseland) to seek King Mulambwa's consent for him to be permitted to enter his territory. Upon receiving the report through his prime minister, King Mulambwa he summoned his cabinet and advisors to deliberate on the issue. This was quickly intervened by Chief Mwene Kandala Vyemba (the second Mbunda chief to migrate to Barotseland) and urged King Mulambwa to turn down the request because he assured the king that Chief Mwene Chitengi Chiyengele and his followers were very rebellious and war like people who would dishonour the King. King Mwene Kandala conspired against King Mwene Chitengi Chingumbe Chiyengele for fear that if he was also permitted to settle in Bulozi he would start afresh the matter that caused the sharp differences between them and hence resulted in Kandala's departure from Mbundaland. Upon getting Chief Mwene Kandala's report, King Mulambwa took it upon himself to investigate and prove if it was really true. He sent spies to where Chief Mwene Chitengi and his men were camping. He sent Noblemen Mukulu wa Kashiko (Mbangweta Nan'uya), Luyanga, Katema Mukwa and Namamba. When the spies viewed the camp they discovered that those people had brought virtually all their belongings, children and all their animals and they were reassured that they were not coming for war and dismissed Chief Mwene Kandala's report as false. The King sent a message through Nobleman Mukulu wa Kashiko that they should cross the Zambezi river. It took them seven days to cross because there were many people.

The Mbunda of Chief Mwene Chitengi Chingumbe Chiyengele crossed at Mutueo across Makuna and camped between N'omano and Nalukonga and were treated to a grand fete. King Mulambwa slaughtered ten bulls for them which the people ate and rejoiced greatly. Chief Mwene Chitengi Chiyengele came with his own royal drums and xylophones. He was allowed to have the royal drums and xylophones sounded in his honour. One of his major royal drums was called Kenda na Vafwa, while his royal xylophone was known as Kamuyongole. Because of his peaceful arrival in Bulozi he was assured of retaining his chieftainship.

King Mulambwa of the Aluyi offered Chief Mwene Chitengi Chingumbe Chiyengele the area known as Namaya in the plains east of Namuyowa for him to settle with the people. But he declined that offer because the Mbunda were not used to staying in the plain, but preferred forests where they cultivate their staple food such as cassava, millet family crops, beans, groundnuts and bush potatoes. Thereafter he was offered another area called Nan'oko, in Mongu where Chief Mwene Chitengi Chingumbe Chiyengele built his Palace, and settled with a group of his Mbunda followers.

== Military Power ==
The Aluyi and their leader, King Mulambwa especially prized the Mbunda for their ability to fight. At the time of Chief Mwene Chitengi Chingumbe Chiyengele's arrival in Bulozi, the Luvale also known as Lovale used to raid the Aluyi for the purposes of cattle rustling, invading Barotseland from the north. At one time a Luvale prince came to visit the Lozi and unfortunately got caught by a crocodile by a stream which is found at Nawinda (the Lozi capital of the day). The Luvale thought that the Aluyi had sent the crocodile and consequently the Luvale attacked and burned Nawinda.

Because of the attacks from the Luvale, King Mulambwa decided to have Chief Mwene Chitengi Chingumbe Chiyengele and his people settle at Liayelo. The Mbunda would therefore be a buffer against the Luvale raiders as well as to ascertain their fighting capability. After Chief Mwene Chitengi Chiyengele and his people had settled, the Luvale came to attack the Aluyi using Liayelo as their entry point. However Noblemen; Mwata Ndumba ya Shamba, Mwata Chala cha Likundo and Mwata Muthindo wa Matumbo at Liayelo quickly informed Chief Mwene Chitengi Chiyengele at Nan'oko about the Luvale raiders.

The Mbunda sounded the royal drum called kenda na vafwa (companion of the ancestral spirits) to summon all the Mbunda men to encounter the Luvale. The Mbunda took up arms and engaged the attacking Luvale and defeated them. With the successful prosecution of the battle against the Luvale by the Mbunda under Chief Mwene Chitengi Chiyengele himself, the Mbunda fighters headed for King Mulambwa's capital at Lilundu. They played and sung their war dances and songs to the accompaniment of Chief Mwene Chitengi Chiyengele's mukupele drum named Kenda na Vafwa, expecting the Aluyi of King Mulambwa to meet them on the way and together take the mukoke victory procession to the capital itself. However the Aluyi were not forthcoming as had been anticipated by the Mbunda and had, in fact, made their escape from King Mulambwa's capital at Lilundu upon hearing and observing the advancing procession of jubilant Mbunda fighters who carried the impaled heads of their victims.

Upon their arrival in the capital, most of its inhabitants had already fled for fear that the war like Mbunda led by Chief Mwene Chitengi Chiyengele and his son Prince Munamwene Ngulungu were coming to make war with the Aluyi after routing the Luvale raiders. Only King Mulambwa and a few trusted guards who had resigned themselves to whatever fate might meet them had remained in the capital. The majority of the Aluyi who had run away had given credence to the earlier allegation by Chief Mwene Kandala Vyemba that the Mbunda of Chief Mwene Chitengi Chiyengele together with their chief were war mongers. Nevertheless, King Mulambwa still trusted and hoped that Chief Mwene Chitengi Chiyengele and his people were not coming to make war against the Aluyi. That was the appropriate time the Mbunda would have conquered and occupied Barotseland, by simply beheading the Aluyi King who was left vulnerable. However, it signifies that the Mbunda people migration to Barotseland was peaceful and friendly.

King Mulambwa told his guards to find out whether Chief Mwene Chitengi Chiyengele and his people had come to Lilundu to make war or come in peace. Chief Mwene Chitengi Chiyengele and his fighters were shocked by the enquiry. Chief Mwene Chitengi Chiyengele explained that the victory procession (mukoke) which might seem a strange ritual to the Aluyi was the normal way the Mbunda celebrated victory. He explained that the Mbunda had expected the Aluyi to come out of their capital and greet the celebrating Mbunda so that both could have celebrated the victory. He also explained that the impaled heads they carried belonged to the fallen Luvale, most of whom had been killed except for a few who were allowed to return to report the defeat. King Mulambwa was shocked by the impaled heads and told the Mbunda never to bring the heads of their victims again for this was taboo in the Aluyi tradition.

== The Mulambwa/Chiyengele Treaty ==
King Mulambwa now knew of the fighting ability of the Mbunda and confirmed Chief Mwene Chitengi Chiyengele's right to stay in Bulozi as the Senior Mbunda Chief. King Mulambwa decided to cement the bond of friendship between the Aluyi and the Mbunda. On a specially appointed occasion, in the presence of King Mulambwa, Aluyana and Mbunda royalty, Aluyana and Mbunda elders and Aluyana and Mbunda public, Chief Mwene Chitengi Chiyengele was ceremonially given a sharp pointed pole called mulombwe with a ten (10) point Mulambwa/ Chiyengele Treaty decreed as follows:

1) We give you this sharp-pointed pole to replace those poles with rounded tops for your royal palace. It is only your palace which will be built with sharp poles called milombwe.

2) Your royal drum (Kenda na Vafwa) and royal xylophone Kamuyongole should be played in your palace, when you visit others and whenever you come to this capital.

3) It is only you who will use a royal flyswitch of the eland (meaning in the King’ presence in the capital).

4) You are free to continue to teach your people your language and culture; you will not be forced to take our language and culture.

5) There shall never be an Aluyi person who enslaves a Mbunda and no Mbunda shall enslave an Aluyi.

6) You are not forced to live on the Barotse plain but free to live in the forests.

7) You are free to cultivate cassava, yams and millet in the multitude that you wish.

8) In military and political matters you should be allied with the Aluyi.

9) Never fight among one another, but love one another.

10) Finally, respect chieftainship and the elders.

This and other factors earned the Mbunda to be included on the Barotse National Council. These were later called the Chiyengele group or Mbunda Xamuka.

== See also ==
- Mbunda Kingdom
- Mbunda language
- Mbunda people
- List of Mbunda Chiefs in Zambia
- List of The Rulers of the Mbunda Kingdom
