= Mpezeni I =

African warrior-king (c. 1830–1900)

Mphezeni or 'Mphezeni I KaZwangendaba (c. 1827–1900) was warrior-king of one of the largest Ngoni groups of central Africa, based in what is now the Chipata District of Zambia, at a time when the British South Africa Company (BSAC) of Cecil Rhodes was trying to assume control over the territory for the British Empire. Mpezeni was courted by the Portuguese and the BSAC sent agents to obtain a treaty—Alfred Sharpe in 1889, and Joseph Maloney in 1895, who were both unsuccessful.

In 1897, with over 4,000 warriors, Mphezeni declared the treaties that had been signed null and void and issued a declaration of war against the British, but was eventually defeated. He signed the treaty which allowed him to rule as King of the Ngoni in Zambia's Eastern Province and Malawi's Mchinji district. His successors as chief take the title Inkosi YaMakhosi Mphezeni to this day.
