= 2006 UEFA European Under-19 Championship squads =

Player listings in youth football competition

Players born on or after 1 January 1987 were eligible to participate in the tournament. Players' age as of 18 July 2006 – the tournament's opening day. Players in bold have later been capped at full international level.

== Group A ==
=== Austria ===
Head coach: (Austria) Paul Gludovatz

No.	Pos.	Player	Date of birth (age)	Caps	Club
1	GK	Bartolomej Kuru	6 April 1987 (aged 19)		Austria Wien
2	DF	Niklas Lercher	10 February 1987 (aged 19)		(Germany) 1860 Munich
3	DF	Daniel Gramann	6 January 1987 (aged 19)		(Austria) Hartberg
4	MF	**Sebastian Prödl**	21 June 1987 (aged 19)		(Austria) Sturm Graz
5	DF	Michael Madl	21 March 1988 (aged 18)		Austria Wien
6	DF	**Markus Suttner**	16 April 1987 (aged 19)		Austria Wien
7	FW	Daniel Sikorski	2 November 1987 (aged 18)		(Germany) Bayern Munich
8	MF	**Veli Kavlak**	8 November 1988 (aged 17)		Austria Wien
9	FW	**Erwin Hoffer**	14 April 1987 (aged 19)		(Austria) Rapid Wien
10	MF	Tomáš Šimkovič	16 April 1987 (aged 19)		Austria Wien
11	FW	Butrint Vishaj	9 July 1987 (aged 19)		(Austria) Admira Wacker
12	FW	**Rubin Okotie**	6 June 1987 (aged 19)		Austria Wien
13	MF	Thomas Hinum	24 July 1987 (aged 18)		(Austria) Schwanenstadt
14	DF	Michael Glauninger	18 January 1987 (aged 19)		(Austria) Grazer AK
15	MF	Clemens Walch	10 July 1987 (aged 19)		(Austria) Red Bull Salzburg
16	MF	Peter Hackmair	6 June 1987 (aged 19)		(Austria) Ried
17	MF	Harald Pichler	18 June 1987 (aged 19)		(Austria) Red Bull Salzburg
18	GK	Michael Zaglmair	7 December 1987 (aged 18)		(Austria) LASK Linz

=== Belgium ===
Head coach: (Belgium) Marc Van Geersom

No.	Pos.	Player	Date of birth (age)	Caps	Club
1	GK	Davino Verhulst	25 November 1987 (aged 18)		(Belgium) Beveren
2	DF	Benjamin Lutun	2 June 1987 (aged 19)		(Belgium) Club Brugge
3	DF	Timothy Dreesen	30 January 1987 (aged 19)		(Belgium) Club Brugge
4	DF	Timothy Derijck	25 May 1987 (aged 19)		(Netherlands) Feyenoord
5	DF	**Sébastien Pocognoli**	1 August 1987 (aged 18)		(Belgium) Racing Genk
6	MF	**Marouane Fellaini**	22 November 1987 (aged 18)		(Belgium) Standard Liège
7	FW	**Jonathan Legear**	13 April 1987 (aged 19)		(Belgium) Anderlecht
8	MF	Jorn Vermeulen	16 April 1987 (aged 19)		(Belgium) Club Brugge
9	FW	Steve De Ridder	25 February 1987 (aged 19)		(Belgium) Gent
10	FW	**Kevin Mirallas**	5 October 1987 (aged 18)		(France) Lille
11	FW	**Roland Lamah**	31 December 1987 (aged 18)		(Belgium) Anderlecht
12	GK	Ruud Boffin	4 April 1987 (aged 19)		(Netherlands) PSV
13	DF	Michaël Jonckheere	1 September 1987 (aged 18)		(Belgium) Molenbeek Brussels
14	DF	Wouter Corstjens	13 February 1987 (aged 19)		(Belgium) Westerlo
15	DF	Massimo Moia	9 March 1987 (aged 19)		(France) Sochaux
16	MF	Daan Van Gijseghem	2 March 1987 (aged 19)		(Belgium) Moeskroen
17	FW	Jordan Remacle	14 February 1987 (aged 19)		(Netherlands) Waalwijk
18	FW	**Marvin Ogunjimi**	12 October 1987 (aged 18)		(Belgium) Racing Genk

=== Czech Republic ===
Head coach: (Czech Republic) Miroslav Soukup

No.	Pos.	Player	Date of birth (age)	Caps	Club
1	GK	Radek Petr	24 February 1987 (aged 19)		(Czech Republic) Baník Ostrava
2	DF	Jakub Dohnálek	12 January 1988 (aged 18)		(Czech Republic) Slovan Liberec
3	DF	Petr Pavlík	22 July 1987 (aged 18)		(Czech Republic) Baník Ostrava
4	DF	**Michal Švec**	19 March 1987 (aged 19)		(Czech Republic) Slavia Prague
5	DF	**Jan Šimůnek**	20 February 1987 (aged 19)		(Czech Republic) Sparta Prague
6	MF	**Marcel Gecov**	1 January 1987 (aged 19)		(Czech Republic) Slavia Prague
7	DF	**Ondřej Mazuch**	15 March 1989 (aged 17)		(Czech Republic) Brno
8	MF	Marek Jungr	11 April 1987 (aged 19)		(Czech Republic) Sparta Prague
9	FW	**Martin Fenin**	16 April 1987 (aged 19)		(Czech Republic) Teplice
10	MF	Jakub Mareš	26 January 1987 (aged 19)		(Czech Republic) Teplice
11	FW	**Jan Blažek**	20 March 1988 (aged 18)		(Czech Republic) Slovan Liberec
12	MF	**Petr Janda**	5 January 1987 (aged 19)		(Czech Republic) Slavia Prague
13	MF	Ivan Hašek	11 November 1987 (aged 18)		(Czech Republic) Bohemians Praha
14	DF	Ondřej Kúdela	26 March 1987 (aged 19)		(Czech Republic) Slovácko
15	MF	**Marek Strestik**	1 February 1987 (aged 19)		(Czech Republic) Brno
16	GK	Luděk Frydrych	3 January 1987 (aged 19)		(Czech Republic) Hradec Králové
17	MF	**Kamil Vacek**	18 May 1987 (aged 19)		(Germany) Arminia Bielefeld
18	FW	Jiří Jeslínek	30 September 1987 (aged 18)		(Czech Republic) Dynamo České Budějovice

=== Poland ===
Head coach: (Poland) Michał Globisz

No.	Pos.	Player	Date of birth (age)	Caps	Club
1	GK	**Przemysław Tytoń**	4 January 1987 (aged 19)		(Poland) Górnik Łęczna
2	DF	Artur Marciniak	18 August 1987 (aged 18)		(Poland) Lech Poznań
3	DF	Jarosław Fojut	17 October 1987 (aged 18)		(England) Bolton Wanderers
4	MF	Krzysztof Król	6 February 1987 (aged 19)		(Poland) Dyskobolia Grodzisk Wielkopolski
5	DF	Krzysztof Strugarek	19 February 1987 (aged 19)		(Poland) Lech Poznań
6	DF	Arkadiusz Czarnecki	10 July 1987 (aged 19)		(Poland) Lech Poznań
7	MF	Tomasz Cywka	27 June 1988 (aged 18)		(England) Wigan Athletic
8	FW	Kamil Oziemczuk	29 May 1988 (aged 18)		(France) Auxerre
9	FW	Andrew Konopelsky	17 August 1987 (aged 18)		(United States) Northeastern University
10	MF	Filip Burkhardt	23 March 1987 (aged 19)		(Poland) Lech Poznań
11	FW	**Dawid Janczyk**	23 September 1987 (aged 18)		(Poland) Legia Warszawa
12	GK	Jakub Hładowczak	6 June 1987 (aged 19)		(Poland) Sandecja Nowy Sącz
13	DF	Łukasz Nadolski	3 September 1987 (aged 18)		(Poland) Cartusia Kartuzy
14	MF	Mariusz Sacha	19 July 1987 (aged 18)		(Poland) Podbeskidzie Bielsko-Biała
15	MF	Krzysztof Michalak	15 April 1987 (aged 19)		(Poland) GKS Bełchatów
16	DF	Paweł Król	10 December 1987 (aged 18)		(Poland) Korona Kielce
17	MF	**Jakub Tosik**	21 May 1987 (aged 19)		(Poland) GKS Bełchatów
18	FW	Kamil Stachyra	23 May 1987 (aged 19)		(Poland) Górnik Łęczna

== Group B ==
=== Portugal ===
Head coach: Carlos Dinis

No.	Pos.	Player	Date of birth (age)	Caps	Club
1	GK	Igor Araújo	4 February 1987 (aged 19)		(Portugal) Porto
2	DF	Pedro Correia	27 March 1987 (aged 19)		(Portugal) Benfica
3	DF	**Steven Vitória**	11 January 1987 (aged 19)		(Portugal) Porto
4	MF	Paulo Renato	14 May 1987 (aged 19)		(Portugal) Sporting CP
5	DF	André Marques	1 August 1987 (aged 18)		(Portugal) Sporting CP
6	MF	Nuno Coelho	23 November 1987 (aged 18)		(Portugal) Porto
7	MF	Bruno Gama	15 November 1987 (aged 18)		(Portugal) Porto
8	MF	Zezinando	1 January 1987 (aged 19)		(Portugal) Sporting CP
9	FW	Paulo Ferreira	11 February 1987 (aged 19)		(Portugal) Leixões
10	FW	David Caiado	2 May 1987 (aged 19)		(Portugal) Sporting CP
11	FW	**Hélder Barbosa**	25 May 1987 (aged 19)		(Portugal) Porto
12	GK	Ricardo Janota	10 March 1987 (aged 19)		(Portugal) Benfica
13	MF	**Vitorino Antunes**	1 April 1987 (aged 19)		(Portugal) Freamunde
14	DF	João Pedro	29 December 1987 (aged 18)		(Portugal) Porto
15	MF	Bruno Pereirinha	2 March 1988 (aged 18)		(Portugal) Sporting CP
16	FW	Diogo Tavares	29 July 1987 (aged 18)		(Portugal) Sporting CP
17	MF	Feliciano Condesso	6 April 1987 (aged 19)		(England) Southampton
18	MF	Mano	9 April 1987 (aged 19)		(Portugal) Belenenses

=== Scotland ===
Head coach: (Scotland) Archie Gemmill

No.	Pos.	Player	Date of birth (age)	Caps	Club
1	GK	Andrew McNeil	19 January 1987 (aged 19)		(Scotland) Hibernian
2	DF	Andrew Cave-Brown	5 August 1988 (aged 17)		(England) Norwich City
3	MF	**Lee Wallace**	21 August 1987 (aged 18)		(Scotland) Heart of Midlothian
4	MF	Charles Grant	27 January 1987 (aged 19)		(Scotland) Celtic
5	DF	**Garry Kenneth**	21 June 1987 (aged 19)		(Scotland) Dundee United
6	DF	Scott Cuthbert	15 June 1987 (aged 19)		(Scotland) Celtic
7	MF	Simon Ferry	1 January 1988 (aged 18)		(Scotland) Celtic
8	FW	Calum Elliot	30 March 1987 (aged 19)		(Scotland) Heart of Midlothian
9	FW	**Steven Fletcher**	26 March 1987 (aged 19)		(Scotland) Hibernian
10	MF	**Michael McGlinchey**	7 January 1987 (aged 19)		(Scotland) Celtic
11	FW	**Robert Snodgrass**	7 September 1987 (aged 18)		(Scotland) Livingston
12	GK	Scott Fox	28 June 1987 (aged 19)		(Scotland) Celtic
14	FW	**Graham Dorrans**	5 May 1987 (aged 19)		(Scotland) Livingston
15	MF	Ryan Conroy	28 April 1987 (aged 19)		(Scotland) Celtic
16	MF	Greg Cameron	10 April 1988 (aged 18)		(Scotland) Dundee United
17	MF	Brian Gilmour	8 May 1987 (aged 19)		(Scotland) Rangers
18	DF	Mark Reynolds	7 May 1987 (aged 19)		(Scotland) Motherwell
19	DF	Jamie Adams	26 August 1987 (aged 18)		(Scotland) Kilmarnock

=== Spain ===
Head coach: (Spain) Ginés Meléndez

No.	Pos.	Player	Date of birth (age)	Caps	Club
1	GK	Antonio Adán (c)	13 May 1987 (aged 19)		(Spain) Real Madrid C
2	DF	Antonio Barragán	12 June 1987 (aged 19)		(England) Liverpool
3	DF	José Ángel Crespo	9 February 1987 (aged 19)		(Spain) Sevilla B
4	DF	Marc Valiente	29 March 1987 (aged 19)		(Spain) Barcelona B
5	DF	**Gerard Piqué**	2 February 1987 (aged 19)		(England) Manchester United
6	MF	**Mario Suárez**	24 February 1987 (aged 19)		(Spain) Atlético Madrid B
7	MF	Toni Calvo	28 March 1987 (aged 19)		(Spain) Barcelona youth
8	MF	**Javi García**	8 February 1987 (aged 19)		(Spain) Real Madrid Castilla
9	FW	César Díaz	5 January 1987 (aged 19)		(Spain) Albacete B
10	MF	Esteban Granero	2 July 1987 (aged 19)		(Spain) Real Madrid Castilla
11	MF	**Diego Capel**	16 February 1988 (aged 18)		(Spain) Sevilla B
12	DF	Roberto Canella	7 February 1988 (aged 18)		(Spain) Sporting de Gijón B
13	GK	Ángel Bernabé	11 August 1987 (aged 18)		(Spain) Atlético Madrid youth
14	FW	Marc Pedraza	6 February 1987 (aged 19)		(Spain) Espanyol B
15	MF	**Jeffrén**	20 January 1988 (aged 18)		(Spain) Barcelona youth
16	FW	**Juan Mata**	28 April 1988 (aged 18)		(Spain) Real Madrid Juvenil A
17	DF	Gorka Elustondo	8 March 1987 (aged 19)		(Spain) Real Sociedad B
18	FW	Alberto Bueno	20 March 1988 (aged 18)		(Spain) Real Madrid Juvenil A

=== Turkey ===
Head coach: (Turkey) Cem Pamiroğlu

No.	Pos.	Player	Date of birth (age)	Caps	Club
1	GK	**Volkan Babacan**	11 August 1988 (aged 17)		(Turkey) Fenerbahçe
2	DF	**Serdar Kurtuluş**	23 July 1987 (aged 18)		(Turkey) Beşiktaş
3	DF	Ferhat Öztorun	8 May 1987 (aged 19)		(Turkey) Galatasaray
4	DF	Emre Karaman	8 December 1987 (aged 18)		(Turkey) Giresunspor
5	MF	**Serdar Özkan**	1 January 1987 (aged 19)		(Turkey) Beşiktaş
6	FW	**Arda Turan**	30 January 1987 (aged 19)		(Turkey) Galatasaray
7	MF	Gürhan Gürsoy	24 September 1987 (aged 18)		(Turkey) Fenerbahçe
8	DF	Enis Kahraman	23 September 1987 (aged 18)		(Turkey) Trabzonspor
9	FW	İlhan Parlak	18 January 1987 (aged 19)		(Turkey) Kayserispor
10	MF	Cafercan Aksu	15 January 1987 (aged 19)		(Turkey) Galatasaray
11	FW	**Aydın Yılmaz**	29 January 1988 (aged 18)		(Turkey) Galatasaray
12	GK	Serkan Boydak	7 March 1987 (aged 19)		(Turkey) Beşiktaş
13	DF	**Aykut Demir**	22 October 1988 (aged 17)		(Netherlands) NAC Breda
14	FW	Kenan Özer	16 August 1987 (aged 18)		(Turkey) Beşiktaş
15	FW	**Mevlüt Erdinç**	25 February 1987 (aged 19)		(France) Sochaux
16	MF	Barış Ataş	1 February 1987 (aged 19)		(Turkey) Diyarbakırspor
17	DF	Mehmet Sedef	5 August 1987 (aged 18)		(Turkey) Beşiktaş
18	MF	Mehmet Güven	30 July 1987 (aged 18)		(Turkey) Galatasaray
