= Godinho (surname) =

Godinho is a Portuguese surname. Notable people with the name include:

- Ana Mendes Godinho (born 1972), Portuguese jurist, public servant, and politician
- Belmácio Pousa Godinho (1892–1980), Brazilian footballer, musician, and businessman
- Eduardo Godinho Felipe (born 1976), Brazilian footballer
- Eduardo Godinho Felipe de Souza (born 1981), Brazilian footballer
- Filipe Godinho (born 1989), Portuguese footballer
- Hélder Godinho (born 1977), Portuguese footballer
- Henriqueta Godinho Gomes (1942–2018), Bissau-Guinean political leader
- João Godinho (born 1984), Portuguese footballer
- Júlio César Godinho Catolé (born 1986), Brazilian footballer
- Manuel Augusto Pinho Godinho (known simply as "Godinho", born 1985), Portuguese footballer
- Manuel Godinho de Erédia (1563–1623), Bugis-Portuguese writer and cartographer
- Marcus Godinho (born 1997), Canadian footballer
- Maria Godinho, Portuguese materials scientist and professor
- Marta Godinho (born 1980), Portuguese long jumper
- Mauvin Godinho, Indian politician and businessman
- Nicolas Godinho Johann (born 1989), Brazilian footballer
- Patrícia Godinho Gomes (born 1972), Bissau-Guinean historian and academic
- Paulo Eduardo Ferreira Godinho (born 2002), Brazilian footballer
- Renato Godinho (born 1981), Portuguese actor and director
- Sandra Godinho (born 1973), Portuguese judoka
- Sérgio Godinho (born 1945), Portuguese singer-songwriter
- Susana Godinho (born 1992), Portuguese long-distance runner
- Tiago Godinho (born 1984), Portuguese tennis player
- Vasco Mira Godinho (born 1989), Portuguese equestrian athlete
- Vítor Godinho (1944–2023), Canadian footballer
- Vitorino Magalhães Godinho (1918–2011), Portuguese historian and social scientist

== See also ==
- Hélio Marques Pereira (known simply as "Godinho", 1925–1971), Brazilian basketball player
