= List of German football transfers winter 2007–08 =

This is a list of German football transfers in the winter transfer window 2007–08 by club. Only transfers of the Bundesliga, and 2. Bundesliga are included.

== Bundesliga ==
=== Hertha BSC ===
In:

Out:

Note: Flags indicate national team as has been defined under FIFA eligibility rules. Players may hold more than one non-FIFA nationality.

No.	Pos.	Nation	Player
—	MF	CZE	Rudolf Skacel (on loan from Southampton)
—	MF	USA	Bryan Arguez (from D.C. United)
—	FW	BRA	Raffael (from Zürich)
—	FW	BUL	Valeri Domovchiyski (on loan from Levski Sofia)
—	MF	SRB	Gojko Kačar (from Vojvodina)

No.	Pos.	Nation	Player
—	DF	BRA	Gilberto (to Tottenham Hotspur)
—	DF	GER	Christian Müller (to Energie Cottbus)
—	DF	GER	Malik Fathi (to Spartak Moscow)

=== Arminia Bielefeld ===
In:

No.	Pos.	Nation	Player
—	GK	GER	Drik Heinen (from retirement)
—	FW	GER	Thilo Versick (from Arminia Bielefeld II)

Out:

No.	Pos.	Nation	Player
—	FW	MAR	Abdelaziz Ahanfouf (to Wehen Wiesbaden)

=== VfL Bochum ===
In:

No.	Pos.	Nation	Player
—	MF	JPN	Shinji Ono (from Urawa Red Diamonds)
—	FW	UKR	Oleksiy Byelik (on loan from Shakhtar Donetsk)
—	MF	GER	Mimoun Azaouagh (on loan from Schalke 04)

Out:

No.	Pos.	Nation	Player
—	MF	CRO	Ivo Iličević (on loan to Greuther Fürth)

=== Werder Bremen ===
In:

No.	Pos.	Nation	Player
—	MF	GER	Mesut Özil (from Schalke 04)

Out:

No.	Pos.	Nation	Player
—	MF	BRA	Carlos Alberto (on loan to Botafogo, previously on loan at São Paulo)
—	FW	COL	John Mosquera (on loan to Alemannia Aachen)
—	MF	DEN	Leon Andreasen (to Fulham)

=== Energie Cottbus ===
In:

No.	Pos.	Nation	Player
—	MF	GER	Thomas Franke (from Energie Cottbus)
—	MF	GER	Christian Müller (from Hertha BSC)
—	FW	CZE	Michal Papadopulos (on loan from Bayer Leverkusen)
—	FW	SRB	Branko Jelić (from Xiamen Lanshi)
—	MF	SRB	Dušan Vasiljević (from Kaposvári Rákóczi)
—	DF	BIH	Ivan Radeljić (from Slaven Belupo)

Out:

No.	Pos.	Nation	Player
—	FW	CMR	Francis Kioyo (to Maccabi Netanya)
—	MF	POL	Tomasz Bandrowski (to Lech Poznań)
—	FW	GER	Steffen Baumgart (to 1. FC Magdeburg)
—	FW	GER	Marco Küntzel (to FC Augsburg)

=== Borussia Dortmund ===
In:

No.	Pos.	Nation	Player
—	GK	GER	Alexander Bade (from SC Paderborn)
—	DF	SRB	Antonio Rukavina (from Partizan)
—	DF	GER	Mats Hummels (on loan from Bayern Munich)

Out:

No.	Pos.	Nation	Player
—	MF	GER	Lars Ricken (to Borussia Dortmund II)

=== MSV Duisburg ===
In:

No.	Pos.	Nation	Player
—	FW	CRO	Bojan Vručina (on loan from Slaven Belupo)
—	FW	ROU	Claudiu Niculescu (from Dinamo București)
—	DF	ARG	Fernando Ávalos (from Nacional)
—	DF	FRA	Olivier Veigneau (from Monaco)
—	MF	GER	Silvio Schröter (from Hannover 96)

Out:

No.	Pos.	Nation	Player
—	FW	BRA	Ailton (to Metalurh Donetsk)
—	FW	CMR	Mohamadou Idrissou (to SC Freiburg)
—	DF	GER	Necat Aygün (on loan to FC Ingolstadt)
—	MF	MAR	Youssef Mokhtari (to Al-Rayyan)

=== Eintracht Frankfurt ===
In:

No.	Pos.	Nation	Player
—	FW	CZE	Martin Fenin (from Teplice)
—	MF	BRA	Caio (from Barueri)
—	FW	GRE	Evangelos Mantzios (on loan from Panathinaikos)

Out:

No.	Pos.	Nation	Player
—	MF	GER	Albert Streit (to Schalke 04)
—	FW	GER	Michael Thurk (to FC Augsburg)
—	FW	JPN	Naohiro Takahara (to Urawa Red Diamonds)

=== Hamburger SV ===
In:

No.	Pos.	Nation	Player
—	MF	BEL	Vadis Odjidja-Ofoe (from Anderlecht)
—	MF	BLR	Anton Putsilo (on loan from Dinamo Minsk)

Out:

No.	Pos.	Nation	Player
—	DF	GER	Sebastian Langkamp (to Karlsruher SC)

=== Hannover 96 ===
In:

No.	Pos.	Nation	Player
—	DF	FRA	Valérien Ismaël (from Bayern Munich)

Out:

No.	Pos.	Nation	Player
—	DF	GER	Thomas Kleine (to Borussia Mönchengladbach)
—	MF	GER	Silvio Schröter (to MSV Duisburg)

=== Karlsruher SC ===
In:

No.	Pos.	Nation	Player
—	FW	AUS	Joshua Kennedy (from 1. FC Nürnberg)
—	DF	GER	Sebastian Langkamp (from Hamburger SV)

Out:

No.	Pos.	Nation	Player
—	FW	MNE	Sanibal Orahovac (to Erzgebirge Aue)

=== Bayer Leverkusen ===
In:

No.	Pos.	Nation	Player

Out:

No.	Pos.	Nation	Player
—	FW	CZE	Michal Papadopulos (on loan to Energie Cottbus)
—	MF	SEN	Ricardo Faty (loan return to Roma)

=== Bayern Munich ===
In:

No.	Pos.	Nation	Player
—	MF	GER	Toni Kroos (from Bayern Munich II)
—	DF	BRA	Breno (from São Paulo)

Out:

No.	Pos.	Nation	Player
—	DF	FRA	Valérien Ismaël (to Hannover 96)
—	DF	GER	Mats Hummels (on loan to Borussia Dortmund)
—	MF	PAR	Júlio dos Santos (on loan to Grêmio, previously on loan at Almería)

=== 1. FC Nürnberg ===
In:

No.	Pos.	Nation	Player
—	FW	CZE	Jan Koller (from Monaco)
—	DF	FRA	Jacques Abardonado (from Nice)

Out:

No.	Pos.	Nation	Player
—	FW	AUS	Joshua Kennedy (to Karlsruher SC)
—	FW	GER	Chhunly Pagenburg (on loan to 1860 Munich)

=== F.C. Hansa Rostock ===
In:

No.	Pos.	Nation	Player
—	GK	USA	Kenneth Kronholm (from FSV Frankfurt)
—	DF	BRA	Gledson (from VfB Stuttgart)

Out:

No.	Pos.	Nation	Player
—	GK	GER	Patric Klandt (to FSV Frankfurt)
—	MF	GER	Marcel Schied (to Carl Zeiss Jena)

=== Schalke 04 ===
In:

No.	Pos.	Nation	Player
—	FW	URU	Vicente Sánchez (from Toluca)
—	MF	BRA	Zé Roberto (from Botafogo)
—	MF	GER	Albert Streit (from Eintracht Frankfurt)

Out:

No.	Pos.	Nation	Player
—	MF	GER	Mesut Özil (to Werder Bremen)
—	DF	URU	Darío Rodríguez (to Peñarol)
—	MF	GER	Mimoun Azaouagh (on loan to VfL Bochum)

=== VfB Stuttgart ===
In:

No.	Pos.	Nation	Player
—	FW	ROU	Sergiu Radu (on loan from VfL Wolfsburg)
—	FW	GER	Sven Schipplock (from SSV Reutlingen)
—	GK	GER	Sven Ulreich (from VfB Stuttgart II)
—	MF	GER	Julian Schuster (from VfB Stuttgart II)
—	DF	GER	Marco Pischorn (from VfB Stuttgart II)
—	MF	GER	Peter Perchtold (from VfB Stuttgart II)

Out:

No.	Pos.	Nation	Player
—	DF	GER	David Pisot (on loan to SC Paderborn)
—	FW	SRB	Danijel Ljuboja (on loan to VfL Wolfsburg)
—	MF	CMR	Georges Mandjeck (on loan to 1. FC Kaiserslautern)
—	DF	BRA	Gledson (to Hansa Rostock)
—	GK	AUT	Michael Langer (to SC Freiburg)
—	FW	BRA	Ewerthon (loan return to Real Zaragoza)

=== VfL Wolfsburg ===
In:

No.	Pos.	Nation	Player
—	GK	SUI	Diego Benaglio (from Nacional)
—	FW	SRB	Danijel Ljuboja (on loan from VfB Stuttgart)
—	MF	JPN	Makoto Hasebe (from Urawa Red Diamonds)

Out:

No.	Pos.	Nation	Player
—	FW	ROU	Sergiu Radu (on loan to VfB Stuttgart)
—	MF	ROU	Vlad Munteanu (on loan to Auxerre)
—	DF	GER	Christopher Lamprecht (on loan to 1. FC Kaiserslautern)
—	GK	GER	Patrick Platins (on loan to FC Augsburg)
—	MF	GHA	Isaac Boakye (on loan to Mainz 05)

== 2. Bundesliga ==
=== Alemannia Aachen ===
In:

No.	Pos.	Nation	Player
—	FW	COL	John Mosquera (on loan from Werder Bremen)
—	DF	NGA	Seyi Olajengbesi (on loan from SC Freiburg)
—	MF	GER	Daniel Brinkmann (free agent)
—	GK	GER	David Hohs (from Alemannia Aachen II)

Out:

No.	Pos.	Nation	Player
—	GK	GER	Kristian Nicht (to Viking)
—	DF	GER	Benjamin Weigelt (on loan to 1. FC Kaiserslautern)

=== Erzgebirge Aue ===
In:

No.	Pos.	Nation	Player
—	FW	MNE	Sanibal Orahovac (from Karlsruher SC)
—	MF	ARG	Leandro (from SC Pullendorf)
—	GK	GER	Steffen Süßner (from Sachsen Leipzig)
—	DF	CZE	Adam Petrous (on loan from Slovan Liberec)
—	MF	SUI	Dušan Pavlović (released)

Out:

No.	Pos.	Nation	Player
—	MF	GER	Kevin Hampf (to Rot-Weiß Erfurt)
—	FW	SVN	Ljbisa Strbac (released)
—	MF	GER	Kevin Hansen (to Hamm United FC)

=== FC Augsburg ===
In:

No.	Pos.	Nation	Player
—	FW	GER	Marco Küntzel (from Energie Cottbus)
—	FW	GER	Michael Thurk (from Eintracht Frankfurt)
—	GK	GER	Patrick Platins (on loan from VfL Wolfsburg)

Out:

No.	Pos.	Nation	Player

=== SC Freiburg ===
In:

No.	Pos.	Nation	Player
—	FW	CMR	Mohamadou Idrissou (from MSV Duisburg)
—	GK	AUT	Michael Langer (from VfB Stuttgart)
—	FW	GER	Felix Roth (from SC Freiburg II)
—	FW	TUN	Amir Akrout (on loan from Stade Tunisien)
—	MF	CMR	Alain Ollé Ollé (from Nacional)

Out:

No.	Pos.	Nation	Player
—	MF	GER	Dennis Bührer (to Sportfreunde Siegen)
—	MF	GER	Dennis Kruppke (to Eintracht Braunschweig)
—	GK	GER	Carsten Nulle (to SC Paderborn)
—	DF	NGA	Seyi Olajengbesi (on loan to Alemannia Aachen)
—	DF	AUT	Andreas Ibertsberger (to 1899 Hoffenheim)
—	FW	CPV	Cafu (to Omonia)

=== Greuther Fürth ===
In:

No.	Pos.	Nation	Player
—	MF	CRO	Ivo Iličević (on loan from VfL Bochum)
—	MF	GER	Sascha Boller (from 1899 Hoffenheim II)
—	MF	TUN	Zied Bhairi (from Espérance)

Out:

No.	Pos.	Nation	Player
—	MF	GER	Markus Karl (on loan to FC Ingolstadt)
—	FW	AUT	Stefan Maierhofer (on loan to Rapid Wien)

=== 1899 Hoffenheim ===
In:

No.	Pos.	Nation	Player
—	DF	AUT	Andreas Ibertsberger (from SC Freiburg)
—	DF	GER	Marvin Compper (from Borussia Mönchengladbach)
—	GK	AUT	Ramazan Özcan (on loan from Red Bull Salzburg)

Out:

No.	Pos.	Nation	Player
—	DF	GER	Marcel Throm (to Sportfreunde Siegen)
—	MF	GER	Andreas Mayer (to VfR Aalen)

=== Carl Zeiss Jena ===
In:

No.	Pos.	Nation	Player
—	MF	GER	Marcel Schied (from Hansa Rostock)
—	GK	BLR	Vasily Khomutovsky (from Tom Tomsk)
—	MF	GER	Patrick Amrhein (from Carl Zeiss Jena II)
—	DF	GER	Marco Riemer (from Carl Zeiss Jena II)
—	MF	JPN	Naoya Kikuchi (free agent)
—	MF	COD	Kosi Saka (on loan from Hamburger SV II)

Out:

No.	Pos.	Nation	Player
—	MF	ARG	Víctor Hugo Lorenzón (to Wuppertaler SV Borussia)
—	FW	SEN	Babacar N'Diaye (to SC Verl)
—	FW	GER	Sebastian Helbig (to Dynamo Dresden)
—	GK	GER	Christian Person (to Dynamo Dresden)
—	FW	GEO	Revaz Barabadze (to Anzhi Makhachkala)
—	MF	CYP	Constantinos Charalambidis (to APOEL)

=== 1. FC Kaiserslautern ===
In:

No.	Pos.	Nation	Player
—	MF	CMR	Georges Mandjeck (on loan from VfB Stuttgart)
—	DF	GER	Christopher Lamprecht (on loan from VfL Wolfsburg)
—	DF	GER	Benjamin Weigelt (on loan from Alemannia Aachen)
—	FW	ROU	Constantin Iacob (from Steaua București)

Out:

No.	Pos.	Nation	Player
—	DF	MLI	Boubacar Diarra (to Luzern)
—	MF	DEN	Esben Hansen (to Odense BK)

=== TuS Koblenz ===
In:

No.	Pos.	Nation	Player
—	MF	ARG	Gabriel Fernández (free agent)
—	FW	FIN	Njazi Kuqi (free agent)

Out:

No.	Pos.	Nation	Player
—	FW	MNE	Dragan Bogavac (to SC Paderborn)
—	FW	TUR	Kenan Şahin (to Fortuna Düsseldorf)
—	MF	MKD	Artim Položani (on loan to Dinamo Tirana)
—	GK	SRB	Đorđe Pantić (to Enköpings SK)

=== 1. FC Köln ===
In:

No.	Pos.	Nation	Player
—	MF	GER	Kevin Pezzoni (from Blackburn Rovers)

Out:

No.	Pos.	Nation	Player
—	DF	SUI	Baykal Kulaksızoğlu (to Young Boys)

=== Mainz 05 ===
In:

No.	Pos.	Nation	Player
—	MF	GHA	Isaac Boakye (on loan from VfL Wolfsburg)

Out:

No.	Pos.	Nation	Player

=== Borussia Mönchengladbach ===
In:

No.	Pos.	Nation	Player
—	DF	GER	Thomas Kleine (from Hannover 96)

Out:

No.	Pos.	Nation	Player
—	DF	GER	Marvin Compper (to 1899 Hoffenheim)
—	DF	POR	Zé António (on loan to Manisaspor)

=== 1860 Munich ===
In:

No.	Pos.	Nation	Player
—	FW	GER	Chhunly Pagenburg (on loan from 1. FC Nürnberg)

Out:

No.	Pos.	Nation	Player

=== Kickers Offenbach ===
In:

No.	Pos.	Nation	Player
—	FW	BFA	Aristide Bancé (on loan from Metalurh Donetsk)
—	MF	POR	Ricardo Sousa (from Omonia)

Out:

No.	Pos.	Nation	Player
—	DF	BRA	Sidney (released)

=== VfL Osnabrück ===
In:

No.	Pos.	Nation	Player

Out:

No.	Pos.	Nation	Player
—	MF	GHA	Kweku Essien (loan return to Maamobi)
—	FW	MWI	Daniel Chitsulo (to Rot Weiss Ahlen)
—	FW	GER	Markus Feldhoff (retired)

=== SC Paderborn ===
In:

No.	Pos.	Nation	Player
—	DF	GER	David Pisot (on loan from VfB Stuttgart)
—	GK	GER	Carsten Nulle (from SC Freiburg)
—	FW	MNE	Dragan Bogavac (from TuS Koblenz)
—	MF	GER	Sven Lintjens (from Wuppertaler SV)

Out:

No.	Pos.	Nation	Player
—	GK	GER	Alexander Bade (to Borussia Dortmund)
—	DF	FRA	Lionel Djebi-Zadi (on loan to SC Verl)
—	MF	GER	Jan Männer (released)
—	FW	GEO	David Siradze (on loan to Spartak Nalchik)

=== FC St. Pauli ===
In:

No.	Pos.	Nation	Player
—	DF	GER	Andreas Biermann (from Tennis Borussia Berlin)
—	DF	UKR	Pavlo Ianchuk (from Argeș Pitești)

Out:

No.	Pos.	Nation	Player
—	DF	USA	Ian Joy (to Real Salt Lake)
—	DF	GER	Jeremy Opoku-Karikari (to VfB Stuttgart II)

=== Wehen Wiesbaden ===
In:

No.	Pos.	Nation	Player
—	FW	MAR	Abdelaziz Ahanfouf (from Arminia Bielefeld)
—	FW	CHN	Xie Hui (from Shanghai Shenhua)
—	FW	GER	Dennis Schmidt (on loan from Bayer Leverkusen II)

Out:

No.	Pos.	Nation	Player
—	FW	BRA	Rodrigo Teixeira (to Aboomoslem)
—	MF	CMR	Carl Lombé (to Aris Limassol)
—	MF	GER	Martin Willmann (to SV Elversberg)
—	MF	GER	Olivier Caillas (to Fortuna Düsseldorf)
