= Ricardo Janota =

Portuguese footballer (born 1987)

Personal information
- Full name: Ricardo Baleia Janota
- Date of birth: 10 March 1987 (age 39)
- Place of birth: Pêro Pinheiro, Sintra, Portugal
- Height: 1.90 m (6 ft 3 in)
- Position: Goalkeeper

Team information
- Current team: Académico Viseu (gk coach)

Youth career
- 1995–1997: Progresso Mem-Martins
- 1997–2001: Estrela Amadora
- 2001–2005: Benfica

Senior career*
Years	Team	Apps	(Gls)
2005–2006	Benfica B	2	(0)
2005–2006	Benfica	0	(0)
2006–2007	Estrela de Vendas Novas	5	(0)
2007–2009	Atlético CP	32	(0)
2009–2010	Estrela Amadora	22	(0)
2010–2011	Trofense	0	(0)
2011–2012	Mafra	28	(0)
2012–2013	Atlético CP	11	(0)
2013–2014	Académico Viseu	30	(0)
2014–2015	Oriental	13	(0)
2015–2016	Académico Viseu	46	(0)
2016–2018	Tondela	1	(0)
2018–2019	Mafra	0	(0)
2019–2023	Académico Viseu	53	(0)
Total		243	(0)

International career
2003	Portugal U16	2	(0)
2003–2004	Portugal U17	9	(0)
2005	Portugal U18	2	(0)
2005–2006	Portugal U19	4	(0)

Managerial career
- 2023–: Académico Viseu (gk coach)
- * Club domestic league appearances and goals

Ricardo Baleia Janota (born 10 March 1987) is a Portuguese former professional footballer who played as a goalkeeper. He is currently a goalkeeping coach at Liga Portugal 2 club Académico de Viseu.

Janota began his career with Benfica. He played twice for their B team in the Segunda Divisão, the third tier of Portuguese football, before moving on to third-tier clubs Estrela de Vendas Novas, Atlético CP and Estrela da Amadora. He spent the 2010–11 season with Liga de Honra (second-tier) Trofense, but never played for the first team. After a season back in the third tier with Mafra, Janota returned to Atlético CP, where he finally made his first appearance in the newly renamed Segunda Liga. He continued his Segunda Liga career with Académico Viseu and Oriental, before returning to Viseu in 2015. He signed for Tondela ahead of the 2016–17 season, and made his Primeira Liga debut in April 2017. That was his last top-flight appearance, and after half a season with Mafra he rejoined Académico Viseu in January 2019.

In international football, Janota played for his country from under-16 to under-19 level, and was part of Portugal's squad for the 2007 FIFA U-20 World Cup without taking the field.

== Club career ==
Janota was born in Pêro Pinheiro, Sintra, in the Greater Lisbon area. He began his football career in the youth system of Primeira Liga club Benfica, and made his senior debut for Benfica's B team as a 17-year-old, on 16 October 2005 in a 2–0 defeat of Pinhalnovense in the Segunda Divisão, the third tier of Portuguese football. A few days later, with the club's two main goalkeepers José Moreira out for six months and Quim receiving treatment for a recent injury, Janota received an unexpected call-up to train with the first-team squad ahead of the match with Estrela da Amadora; Quim recovered in time to start the match. Janota played once more for Benfica B, and was once an unused substitute for the first team, before being released at the end of the 2005–06 season. After reported interest from Belgian club Standard Liège and a trial in Spain with Espanyol, he remained in Portugal.

He played five Segunda Divisão matches for Estrela de Vendas Novas in late 2006, then moved on to Atlético CP. Ahead of the 2007–08 season, he had a trial with Spanish third-tier club León, and in October spent a week with Dutch Eredivisie side FC Utrecht to gain experience. Janota made his senior debut for Atlético in February 2008, as a first-half substitute when goalkeeper Filipe Leão was sent off against Carregado, and kept a clean sheet the following week against Lusitânia. After Leão's return from suspension, he and Janota shared the goalkeeping duties for the remainder of the season.

Atlético's need to reduce spending meant Janota was one of only five players retained for 2008–09. He was undisputed first-choice goalkeeper during the regular season, but shared the promotion group duties with Rui Santos. Atlético were not promoted, and Janota left the club at the end of the season. He spent the 2009–10 season as Estrela da Amadora's main goalkeeper, before moving up to the Liga de Honra (second tier) as one of eleven new signings for Trofense. He was an unused substitute in 12 matches but played no competitive first-team football as Trofense came close to promotion to the Primeira Liga.

Janota returned to the Segunda Divisão for 2011–12 as Mafra's regular goalkeeper. He was ever-present until being sent off on 5 February 2012; Mafra had already used all three substitutes, so forward Nuno Sousa had to go in goal for the last few minutes of the match and was unable to prevent Caldas equalising.

He then signed a two-year contract with former club Atlético CP, newly promoted to the Segunda Liga. He began the season as understudy to Filipe Leão, playing only in one League Cup match and the Portuguese Cup second-round defeat to Naval before replacing Leão in the starting eleven on matchday 32 to make his first appearance in the second tier. He kept a clean sheet as Atlético beat Porto B 1–0 to secure only their second win of the season; he was beaten only once, by a shot that hit the post, and, in what Record's correspondent described as a great display, made several good interventions to contribute to the victory for his tiring team. He kept his place for the last 11 matches of the campaign, before becoming the first signing for Segunda Liga newcomers Académico Viseu in June 2013.

Viseu used Janota sparingly at the start of the season, but he then established himself at first choice, and played in 30 consecutive league matches. He then left the club for Oriental, themselves newly promoted to the Segunda Liga, where he found himself used as backup to Tiago Mota and selected only for cup matches. He came into the side in the second half of the season, making 13 league appearances, before rejoining Académico Viseu for 2015–16. Janota was ever-present in league matches in his second spell with Viseu, and was voted best goalkeeper in the Segunda Liga.

On 1 July 2016, Janota signed a two-year contract with Primeira Liga club Tondela. With Cláudio Ramos established as first choice, Janota began the season on the bench. He made his first appearance on 9 October, against Feirense in the League Cup: after 75 minutes, with Tondela already 2–0 down and playing with ten men, he rushed out of his area, brought down an opponent, and was sent off. With no substitutes available, centre-half João Pica had to go in goal; he conceded once, to an own goal. His next appearance was six months later. After Ramos was sent off very late in the previous match, Janota made his Primeira Liga debut at the age of 30, away to Vitória de Guimarães on 9 April 2017; Tondela lost 2–1. In the second year of his contract, he made only one first-team appearance, in the third round of the Portuguese Cup: Tondela let slip a two-goal lead away to second-tier Leixões and lost 3–2 in extra time.

Janota returned to Mafra in 2018, but was restricted to the cup competitions while João Godinho played the league matches. In January 2019, he rejoined Académico Viseu for a third time, signing a contract until the end of the season.

On 30 June 2023, after his seventh season representing the Viseu-based side, Janota announced his retirement as a footballer and became a goalkeeping coach at Académico.

== International career ==
While a youngster with Benfica, he represented his country at under-16 level, and was first-choice goalkeeper at the European under-17 championship finals, at which Portugal's under-17s beat England 3–2 on penalties to win the third-place play-off; Janota saved the decisive penalty. He appeared for the under-18s in 2005, and was in the squad for the European under-19 championship finals, but as second choice behind Porto's Igor Araújo. The sixth-place finish achieved in this competition guaranteed qualification for the 2007 FIFA U-20 World Cup; Janota, by this time an Atlético CP player, was again selected for the squad, but made no appearances.
