= 2011–12 Cypriot First Division =

Laiki Bank League
- Season: 2011–12
- Champions: AEL; 6th title
- Relegated: Aris; Anagennisi; Ermis
- Champions League: AEL
- Europa League: APOEL; Omonia; Anorthosis
- Matches: 218
- Goals: 478 (2.19 per match)
- Top goalscorer: Freddy (17 goals)
- Biggest home win: AEK 6–0 Nea Salamis
- Biggest away win: Ermis 1–5 Aris
- Highest scoring: Nea Salamis 5–2 Anagennisi

The 2011–12 Cypriot First Division was the 73rd season of the Cypriot top-level football league. It began on 27 August 2011 and ended on 12 May 2012. APOEL were the defending champions. AEL Limassol won the championship one matchweek before the end of the season.

The league comprise eleven teams from the 2010–11 season and three promoted teams from the 2010–11 Second Division.

== Teams ==
Doxa Katokopias and APOP Kinyras were relegated at the end of the first stage of the 2010–11 season after finishing in the bottom two places of the table. They were joined by AEP Paphos, who finished at the bottom of the second-phase Group C.

The relegated teams were replaced by 2010–11 Second Division champions Aris Limassol, runners-up Nea Salamis Famagusta and third-placed team Anagennisi Dherynia.

Location of clubs in 2011–12 Cypriot First Division

Club	Location	Venue	Capacity
AEK	Larnaca	Neo GSZ Stadium	13,032
AEL	Limassol	Tsirion Stadium	13,331
Alki	Larnaca	Neo GSZ Stadium	13,032
Anagennisi Dherynia	Dherynia	Tasos Marcou Stadium	5,800
Anorthosis	Larnaca	Antonis Papadopoulos Stadium	10,230
APOEL	Nicosia	GSP Stadium	22,859
Apollon	Limassol	Tsirion Stadium	13,331
Aris	Limassol	Tsirion Stadium	13,331
Enosis	Paralimni	Tasos Marcou Stadium	5,800
Ermis	Aradippou, Larnaca	Ammochostos Stadium	5,500
Ethnikos Achna	Achna, Famagusta	Dasaki Stadium	7,000
Nea Salamis	Larnaca	Ammochostos Stadium	5,500
Olympiakos	Nicosia	GSP Stadium	22,859
Omonia	Nicosia	GSP Stadium	22,859

=== Personnel and kits ===
Note: Flags indicate national team as defined under FIFA eligibility rules. Players and Managers may hold more than one non-FIFA nationality.

Team	Head coach	Captain	Kit manufacturer	Shirt sponsor
AEK	(Netherlands) Leon Vlemmings	(Netherlands) Gregoor van Dijk	Puma	Cytavision
AEL	(Cyprus) Pambos Christodoulou	(Cyprus) Marios Nicolaou	Puma	Cytavision
Alki	(Serbia) Radmilo Ivančević	(Cyprus) Siniša Dobrašinović	Legea	
Anagennisi	(Cyprus) Adamos Adamou	(Cyprus) Giorgos Giannakou	Legea	MetLife Alico
Anorthosis	(Israel) Ronny Levy	(Cyprus) Ioannis Okkas	Puma	Cytamobile-Vodafone
APOEL	(Serbia) Ivan Jovanović	(Cyprus) Marinos Satsias	Puma	MTN
Apollon	(Germany) Hagen Reeck	(Cyprus) Giorgos Merkis	Lotto	Betfair
Aris	(Cyprus) Dimitris Ioannou	(Cyprus) Giorgos Vasiliou	Puma	Cytanet
Enosis	(Cyprus) Marios Karas	(Cyprus) Chrysis Michael	Puma	Cyta
Ermis	(Cyprus) Nikos Andronikou	(Cyprus) Andreas Papathanasiou	Legea	Cyta
Ethnikos	(Greece) Nikos Papadopoulos	(Cyprus) Christos Poyiatzis	Legea	Cyta
Nea Salamina	(England) Stephen Constantine	(Cyprus) Prodromos Therapontos	Givova	Cytamobile-Vodafone
Olympiacos	(Cyprus) Niki Papavasiliou	(Cyprus) Nikolas Nicolaou	Givova	Cyta
Omonia	(Cyprus) Neophytos Larkou	(Cyprus) Constantinos Makrides	Adidas	Cytamobile-Vodafone

=== Managerial changes ===
Team	Outgoing manager	Manner of departure	Date of vacancy	Position in table	Replaced by	Date of appointment
Olympiakos	(Cyprus) Pambos Christodoulou	Resigned	20 March 2011	Pre-season	(Greece) Nikos Papadopoulos	14 May 2011
Ermis	(Portugal) João Carlos Pereira	Sacked	4 May 2011	Pre-season	(Cyprus) Loukas Hadjiloukas	13 May 2011
Alki	(Israel) Itzhak Shum	Sacked	10 May 2011	Pre-season	(Serbia) Radmilo Ivančević	14 May 2011
AEL	(Netherlands) Raymond Atteveld	Sacked	14 May 2011	Pre-season	(Cyprus) Pambos Christodoulou	14 May 2011
Apollon	(Cyprus) Andreas Michaelides	Sacked	23 May 2011	Pre-season	(France) Didier Ollé-Nicolle	10 July 2011
Ermis	(Cyprus) Loukas Hadjiloukas	Resigned	12 August 2011	Pre-season	(Cyprus) Panayiotis Xiourouppas	13 August 2011
Anorthosis	(Bulgaria) Stanimir Stoilov	Sacked	25 September 2011	6th	(Israel) Ronny Levy	2 October 2011
Ethnikos	(Serbia) Svetozar Šapurić	Sacked	5 October 2011	12th	(North Macedonia) Čedomir Janevski	10 October 2011
Ermis	(Cyprus) Panayiotis Xiourouppas	Sacked	24 October 2011	14th	(Cyprus) Nikos Andronikou	24 October 2011
Apollon	(France) Didier Ollé-Nicolle	Sacked	5 November 2011	5th	(Romania) Mihai Stoichiţă	14 November 2011
AEK	(Netherlands) Ton Caanen	Sacked	20 November 2011	6th	(Netherlands) Leon Vlemmings	2 December 2011
Olympiacos	(Greece) Nikos Papadopoulos	Resigned	25 February 2012	11th	(Cyprus) Niki Papavasiliou	26 February 2012
Ethnikos	(North Macedonia) Čedomir Janevski	Sacked	27 January 2012	11th	(Greece) Niκos Papadopoulos	28 January 2012
Apollon	(Romania) Mihai Stoichiţă	Resigned	4 March 2012	7th	(Germany) Hagen Reeck (caretaker)	4 March 2012
Aris	(Serbia) Dušan Mitošević	Sacked	26 March 2012	12th	(Cyprus) Dimitris Ioannou	26 March 2012
Enosis	(Israel) Nir Klinger	Sacked	8 April 2012	12th	(Cyprus) Marios Karas	8 April 2012

== First round ==
Pos	Team	Pld	W	D	L	GF	GA	GD	Pts	Qualification or relegation
1	AEL Limassol	26	18	6	2	33	7	+26	60	Qualification for second round, Group A
2	Omonia Nicosia	26	17	6	3	47	16	+31	57	Qualification for second round, Group A
3	APOEL	26	17	5	4	39	13	+26	56	Qualification for second round, Group A
4	Anorthosis Famagusta	26	15	7	4	30	12	+18	52	Qualification for second round, Group A
5	AEK Larnaca	26	11	9	6	33	21	+12	42	Qualification for second round, Group B
6	Nea Salamis Famagusta	26	10	6	10	33	41	−8	36	Qualification for second round, Group B
7	Apollon Limassol	26	10	4	12	31	39	−8	34 (Note: APOL 5–1 ALK; ALK 2–1 APOL)	Qualification for second round, Group B
8	Alki Larnaca	26	10	4	12	32	40	−8	34	Qualification for second round, Group B
9	Olympiakos Nicosia	26	7	9	10	29	34	−5	30	Qualification for second round, Group C
10	Enosis Neon Paralimni	26	8	5	13	17	24	−7	29 (Note: ENP 0–0 ETH; ETH 1–1 ENP)	Qualification for second round, Group C
11	Ethnikos Achna	26	7	8	11	21	23	−2	29	Qualification for second round, Group C
12	Aris Limassol	26	7	6	13	27	35	−8	27	Qualification for second round, Group C
13	Anagennisi Deryneia (R)	26	2	5	19	16	45	−29	11	Relegation to Cypriot Second Division
14	Ermis Aradippou (R)	26	1	4	21	12	50	−38	7	Relegation to Cypriot Second Division

Source: UEFA
Rules for classification: 1) points; 2) head-to-head points; 3) head-to-head goal difference; 4) head-to-head away goals scored; 5) goal difference; 6) number of goals scored
(R) Relegated
Notes:

Home \ Away	AEK	AEL	ALK	AND	ANO	APOE	APOL	ARI	ENP	ERM	ETH	NSL	OLY	OMO
AEK Larnaca		0–0	2–0	2–0	1–1	0–0	1–1	1–0	0–2	2–0	2–1	6–0	1–1	2–1
AEL Limassol	2–0		1–0	1–0	0–0	0–0	3–0	1–0	1–0	2–0	0–0	2–0	3–2	0–3
Alki Larnaca	2–2	1–2		4–0	1–3	2–1	2–1	1–0	1–0	3–0	0–1	0–1	4–2	0–3
Anagennisi Deryneia	0–3	0–1	1–2		0–2	1–2	4–1	1–1	0–2	2–1	0–0	1–2	0–1	1–1
Anorthosis Famagusta	0–1	0–1	0–0	1–0		2–0	2–0	2–2	1–0	1–0	2–0	1–1	2–1	0–1
APOEL	3–0	0–1	3–1	2–0	0–0		2–1	1–0	1–0	2–0	2–1	1–0	0–0	0–0
Apollon Limassol	0–3	0–3	5–1	1–0	1–1	0–2		1–2	2–0	2–0	2–0	3–2	2–0	2–5
Aris Limassol	1–1	0–1	1–1	2–0	1–0	0–1	2–0		1–0	3–0	1–4	2–3	2–3	1–1
Enosis Neon Paralimni	1–0	0–4	2–0	2–0	0–1	0–2	1–1	2–0		1–0	0–0	0–2	0–1	1–1
Ermis Aradippou	0–1	0–0	1–1	3–2	0–1	1–4	0–2	1–5	0–1		0–0	2–2	1–3	0–2
Ethnikos Achna	1–0	0–1	2–0	1–1	0–1	0–3	0–1	4–0	1–1	2–1		1–0	0–1	0–1
Nea Salamis Famagusta	1–1	0–3	0–1	5–2	0–3	1–0	1–2	2–0	1–1	1–0	1–0		1–1	1–4
Olympiakos Nicosia	1–1	0–0	2–3	0–0	1–2	1–4	0–0	0–0	2–0	3–1	1–1	2–3		0–2
Omonia Nicosia	2–0	1–0	4–1	2–0	0–1	1–3	2–0	3–0	1–0	2–0	1–1	2–2	1–0	

Source: UEFA
Legend: Blue = home team win; Yellow = draw; Red = away team win.

== Second round ==
=== Group A ===
Pos	Team	Pld	W	D	L	GF	GA	GD	Pts	Qualification
1	AEL Limassol (C)	32	20	8	4	37	10	+27	68	Qualification for Champions League second qualifying round
2	APOEL	32	20	6	6	46	19	+27	66 (Note: APOE: 7pts; OMO: 4pts)	Qualification for Europa League second qualifying round
3	Omonia	32	20	6	6	56	23	+33	66	Qualification for Europa League third qualifying round (Note: The 2011–12 Cypriot Cup winners, Omonia, qualified for the third qualifying round of UEFA Europa League. Since they finished third, the fourth-placed team of the league also qualified for the Europa League.)
4	Anorthosis Famagusta	32	17	8	7	36	22	+14	59	Qualification for Europa League second qualifying round

Rules for classification: 1) points; 2) head-to-head points; 3) head-to-head goal difference; 4) head-to-head goals scored; 5) goal difference; 6) number of goals scored.
(C) Champions
Notes:

Home \ Away	AEL	ANO	APOE	OMO
AEL Limassol		1–0	0–0	2–0
Anorthosis Famagusta	1–1		1–2	0–4
APOEL	1–0	1–2		1–2
Omonia Nicosia	1–0	1–2	1–2	

Legend: Blue = home team win; Yellow = draw; Red = away team win.

=== Group B ===
Pos	Team	Pld	W	D	L	GF	GA	GD	Pts
5	AEK Larnaca	32	13	10	9	40	27	+13	49
6	Apollon Limassol	32	12	7	13	36	43	−7	43 (Note: APOL: 8pts; NSL: 2pts)
7	Nea Salamis Famagusta	32	11	10	11	39	47	−8	43
8	Alki Larnaca	32	12	6	14	35	45	−10	42

Rules for classification: 1) points; 2) head-to-head points; 3) head-to-head goal difference; 4) head-to-head goals scored; 5) goal difference; 6) number of goals scored.
Notes:

Home \ Away	AEK	ALK	APOL	NSL
AEK Larnaca		3–1	0–1	1–2
Alki Larnaca	0–2		1–0	1–0
Apollon Limassol	1–0	0–0		1–1
Nea Salamis Famagusta	1–1	0–0	2–2	

Legend: Blue = home team win; Yellow = draw; Red = away team win.

=== Group C ===
Pos	Team	Pld	W	D	L	GF	GA	GD	Pts	Relegation
9	Ethnikos Achna	32	10	10	12	31	30	+1	40	
10	Olympiakos Nicosia	32	10	9	13	36	44	−8	39	
11	Enosis Neon Paralimni	32	11	5	16	26	29	−3	38	
12	Aris Limassol (R)	32	8	8	16	32	44	−12	32	Relegation to Cypriot Second Division

Rules for classification: 1) points; 2) head-to-head points; 3) head-to-head goal difference; 4) head-to-head goals scored; 5) goal difference; 6) number of goals scored.
(R) Relegated

Home \ Away	ARI	ENP	ETH	OLY
Aris Limassol		0–2	2–2	1–0
Enosis Neon Paralimni	1–0		1–2	5–0
Ethnikos Achna	1–1	2–0		2–1
Olympiakos Nicosia	3–1	1–0	2–1	

Legend: Blue = home team win; Yellow = draw; Red = away team win.

== Season statistics ==
=== Top goalscorers ===
Source: Cyprus Football Association

Rank	Player	Club	Goals
1	(Angola) Freddy	Omonia	17
2	(Argentina) Esteban Solari	APOEL	10
3	(Spain) Arnal Llibert	Alki	9
3	(Ivory Coast) Patrick Vouho	AEL	9
5	(Spain) Gonzalo García	AEK	8
5	(Ghana) Chris Dickson	Nea Salamina/AEL	8
7	(Serbia) Miljan Mrdaković	AEK	7
7	(Cyprus) Constantinos Charalambides	APOEL	7
7	(Brazil) Gelson	Aris	7
10	(Sierra Leone) Mustapha Bangura	Apollon	6
10	(Cyprus) Georgios Efrem	Omonia	6
10	(Greece) Christos Chatzipantelidis	Nea Salamina	6
10	(Czech Republic) Jan Rezek	Anorthosis	6
10	(North Macedonia) Hristijan Kirovski	Apollon	6
10	(Cameroon) Emmanuel Kenmogne	Olympiakos	6

=== Hat-tricks ===
Player	For	Against	Result	Date
(North Macedonia) Ivan Tričkovski	APOEL	AEK	3–0	19 December 2011
(Ivory Coast) Patrick Vouho	AEL	Enosis	0–4	7 January 2012
(Cameroon) Emmanuel Kenmogne	Olympiakos	Ermis	3–1	24 March 2012
(Cape Verde) José Semedo ^{5}	Enosis	Olympiakos	5–0	12 May 2012

- ^{5} Player scored 5 goals.

=== Scoring ===
- First goal of the season: 10th minute – (Brazil) Edmar for AEL against Nea Salamina (19:10, 28 August 2011)
- Fastest goal of the season: 37 seconds – (Austria) Mato Šimunović (Anagennisi) against Apollon (11 September 2011)
- Latest goal of the season: 97 minutes and 34 seconds – (Greece) Christos Karipidis (Omonia) against Ethnikos (4 March 2012)
- First own goal of the season: (North Macedonia) Bojan Markovski (Enosis) for Anorthosis (17 September 2011)
- First scored penalty kick of the season: (North Macedonia) Hristijan Kirovski (Apollon) against Anagennisi Dherynia (11 September 2011)
- Most scored goals in a single fixture – 23 goals (Fixture 20)
  - Fixture 20 results: AEK 2–1 Omonia, Anorthosis 0–1 AEL, APOEL 2–1 Ethnikos, Apollon 3–2 Nea Salamina, Anagennisi 1–2 Alki, Ermis 1–5 Aris, Olympiakos 2–0 Enosis.

=== Discipline ===
- First yellow card of the season: (Australia) Danny Invincible for Ermis against Apollon, 7 minutes (28 August 2011)
- First red card of the season: (Liberia) Solomon Grimes for Nea Salamina against AEL, 90 minutes and 44 seconds (28 August 2011)
- Most yellow cards in a single match: 10
  - Anorthosis 2–2 Aris – 4 for Anorthosis (Marquinhos, Jurgen Colin, Igor Tomašić and Evandro Roncatto) and 6 for Aris (Andreas Theofanous, Andrés Imperiale, Christos Charalampous, Carl Lombé, Claudiu Ionescu and Zoltán Kovács) (19 September 2011)

== Attendances ==
#	Club	Average
1	APOEL	7,576
2	AEL	6,655
3	Omonoia	6,643
4	Anorthosis	4,375
5	Apollon Limassol	2,821
6	AEK Larnaca	2,368
7	Nea Salamina	1,713
8	Aris Limassol	1,457
9	Olympiakos Nicosia	1,342
10	Anagennisi	1,185
11	Ethnikos Achnas	1,109
12	Ermis	877
13	Alki	876
14	Paralimni	847

== Sources ==
- "2011/12 Cypriot First Division". Rec.Sport.Soccer Statistics Foundation. 14 January 2016.
