= Paweł Król =

Paweł Król may refer to:

- Paweł Król (footballer, born 1960), Polish international footballer
- Paweł Król (footballer, born 1987), Polish footballer

== See also ==
- Krol
