= Matti Kamenz =

German footballer (born 1998)

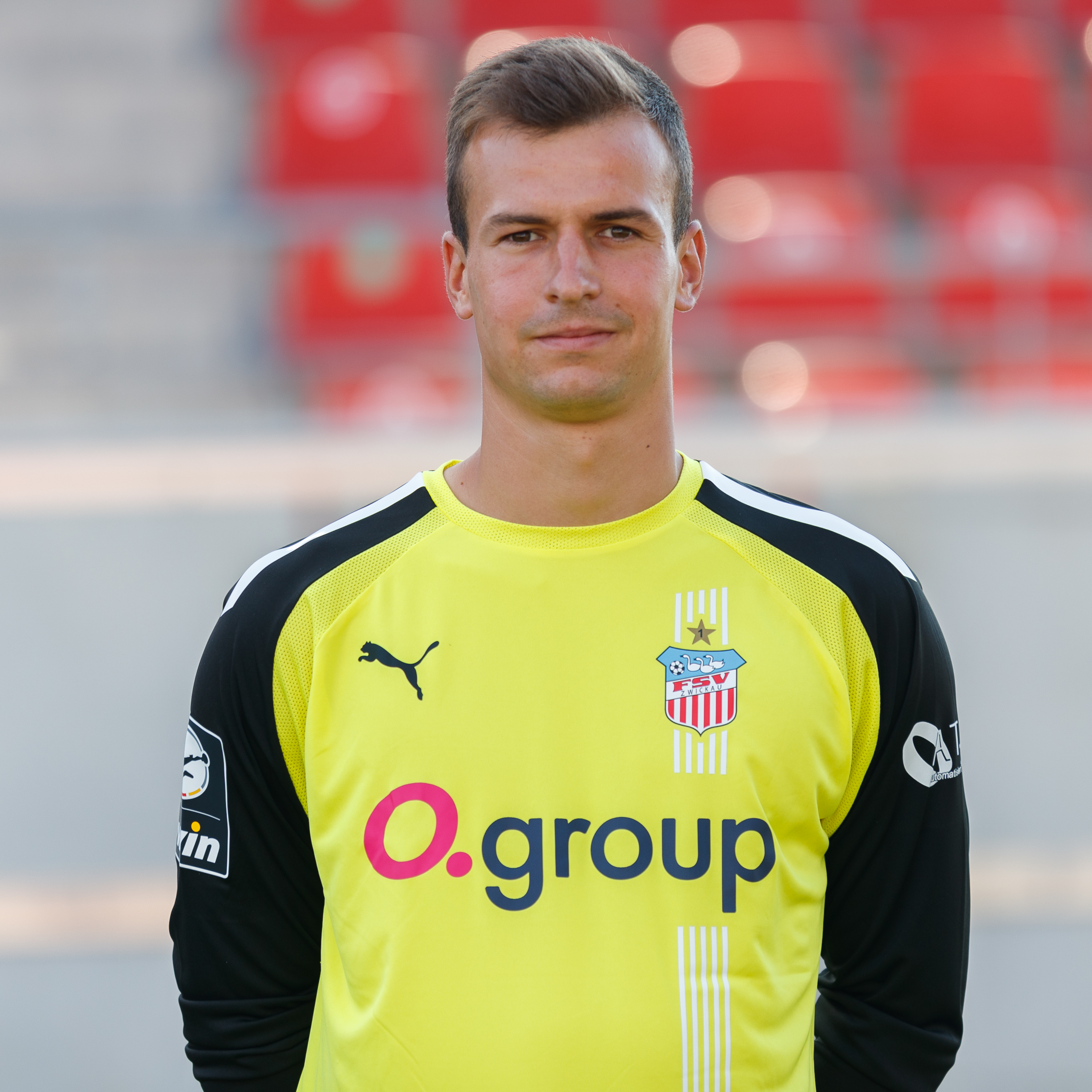
- Kamenz in 2021

Personal information
- Date of birth: 9 August 1998 (age 28)
- Place of birth: Spremberg, Germany
- Height: 1.88 m (6 ft 2 in)
- Position: Goalkeeper

Team information
- Current team: SC Freital
- Number: 1

Youth career
- –2007: SC Spremberg
- 2007–2017: Energie Cottbus

Senior career*
Years	Team	Apps	(Gls)
2015–2016	Energie Cottbus II	9	(0)
2016–2018	Energie Cottbus	0	(0)
2018–2022	FSV Zwickau	10	(0)
2022–2023	Greifswalder FC	20	(0)
2023–	SC Freital	10	(0)
- * Club domestic league appearances and goals as of 8 June 2024

Matti Kamenz (born 9 August 1998) is a German footballer who plays as a goalkeeper for NOFV-Oberliga Süd club SC Freital.
