= Nikos Papadopoulos (footballer, born 1971) =

Greek footballer and manager

Personal information
- Full name: Nikolaos Papadopoulos
- Date of birth: 5 October 1971 (age 55)
- Place of birth: Kilkis, Greece
- Height: 1.81 m (5 ft 11 in)
- Position: Centre-back

Team information
- Current team: APOEL (head coach)

Youth career
- –1988: Apollon Mavroneriou

Senior career*
Years	Team	Apps	(Gls)
1988–1990	Kilkisiakos	37	(0)
1990–1999	OFI	216	(11)
1999–2004	Aris	109	(10)
2004–2005	Skoda Xanthi	17	(2)
2005–2006	Apollon Kalamarias	18	(1)
2006	Ergotelis	8	(0)
2006–2007	Agrotikos Asteras	23	(1)
2007–2008	Thermaikos	18	(1)
2008–2009	Apollon Kalamarias	25	(1)
Total		471	(27)

Managerial career
- 2009: Thermaikos
- 2010–2011: Skoda Xanthi
- 2011–2012: Olympiakos Nicosia
- 2012: Ethnikos Achnas
- 2012–2013: Kavala
- 2013–2014: Panachaiki
- 2014–2016: Iraklis
- 2017–2019: OFI
- 2019–2020: Apollon Smyrnis
- 2021: Panachaiki
- 2021–2022: Chania
- 2022–2024: Greece U21
- 2024: Greece (interim)
- 2024–2026: Levadiakos
- 2026–: APOEL
- * Club domestic league appearances and goals

Nikos Papadopoulos (Greek: Νίκος Παπαδόπουλος; born 5 October 1971) is a Greek professional football manager and former player, who is the current head coach of Cypriot First Division club APOEL.

He is mostly remembered for his 9.5-year spell in OFI. He has also played for Aris, Skoda Xanthi and Apollon Kalamarias in the top tier. In the later stages of his career he played in several clubs in the lower divisions. As a manager, he has coached several clubs in Greece and Cyprus.

== Playing career ==
After playing youth football, for the club of his village, Apollon Mavroneriou, he moved to nearby professional club Kilkisiakos in 1988. He moved to OFI in the winter transfer window of 1989-1990. In his first season, he was part of the squad that reached the Greek Cup final, although he did not participate in the final. He stayed in OFI for 9.5 years and even managed to become captain of the club. In 1997-1998 received a record 21-match ban for being sent-off in a match against Olympiacos. Totally he appeared in 213 matches for the club and scored 11 goals. His impact for the club was so high that in an internet polling of a local Heraklion website in 2011 Papadopoulos was voted among the all-time best XI of OFI.

After leaving OFI he moved to Aris where he stayed for 4.5 years. Totally he played 109 league matches for the club and scored 10 goals. He left Aris for Skoda Xanthi where he stayed for 1 year appearing in 17 matches and scoring 2 goals. His last club in the top tier was Apollon Kalamarias where he scored 1 goal in 16 matches. After his stint at Apollon Kalamarias he moved to the lower divisions. He subsequently moved to Ergotelis, where he appeared in 8 matches helping the club to win the Beta Ethniki. He also had spells with Agrotikos Asteras and Thermaikos and finished his playing career with Apollon Kalamarias.

== Managerial career ==
Papadopoulos started his managerial career in 2009 for Thermaikos. He was appointed assist manager in Skoda Xanthi for the next season and after manager Georgios Paraschos was sacked, Papadopoulos was appointed caretaker manager and finished the season with the club. He moved to Cyprus for the 2011–12 to coach Olympiakos Nicosia. Midway through the season he moved to Ethnikos Achna and he was removed from his position early in the next season. After his spell in Cuprus he signed for Kavala and Panachaiki in the Greek Football League. On 20 April 2014 he was appointed as the manager of Iraklis. In February 2016, Papadopoulos received the best manager award of the North Group of the 2014–15 Football League by the Greek Professional Footballers Association.

Following coaching spells with OFI (2017–2019), Apollon Smyrnis (2019–2020), Panachaiki (2021), and Chania (2021–2022), Papadopoulos was appointed head coach of the Greece U21 in 2022. He remained in charge until 2024 and also served as interim head coach of the Greece national football team in 2024.

In 2024, Papadopoulos took over at Levadiakos, where he remained until 2026. During his tenure, he established the club as a competitive side in the Super League Greece, earning recognition for his organized tactical approach and ability to maximize the squad's potential.

In June 2026, Papadopoulos was appointed head coach of APOEL on a two-year contract running until 2028. His arrival marked the beginning of a new era for the club, with APOEL entrusting him to lead the team domestically and in European competitions. He became one of the few Greek coaches to take charge of the Cypriot giants, bringing extensive experience from both club and international football.

== Honours ==
=== Player ===
Ergotelis

- Beta Ethniki: 2005–06

=== Manager ===
OFI

- Football League: 2017–18
