= Sascha Schünemann =

German footballer

Personal information
- Date of birth: 20 February 1992 (age 34)
- Place of birth: Berlin, Germany
- Height: 1.79 m (5 ft 10 in)
- Position: Midfielder

Team information
- Current team: Hansa Rostock II
- Number: 27

Youth career
- Nordberliner SC
- –2006: Tennis Borussia Berlin
- 2006–2011: Hertha BSC

Senior career*
Years	Team	Apps	(Gls)
2011–2013	Hannover 96 II	55	(0)
2013–2015	Hansa Rostock	39	(1)
2015–2017	BFC Dynamo	52	(4)
2017–2018	Viktoria Berlin	12	(2)
2018–2019	Wuppertaler SV	35	(0)
2019–2020	Hansa Rostock II	7	(3)
2020–2021	Greifswalder FC	8	(1)
2021–	Hansa Rostock II	58	(19)
- * Club domestic league appearances and goals as of 24 April 2024

Sascha Schünemann (born 20 February 1992 in Berlin) is a German footballer who plays as a midfielder for Hansa Rostock II.

== Career ==
On 4 October 2019, it was confirmed that Schünemann had joined the reserve team of Hansa Rostock as a free agent after training with the team since summer 2019.
