= Lion Semić =

German footballer

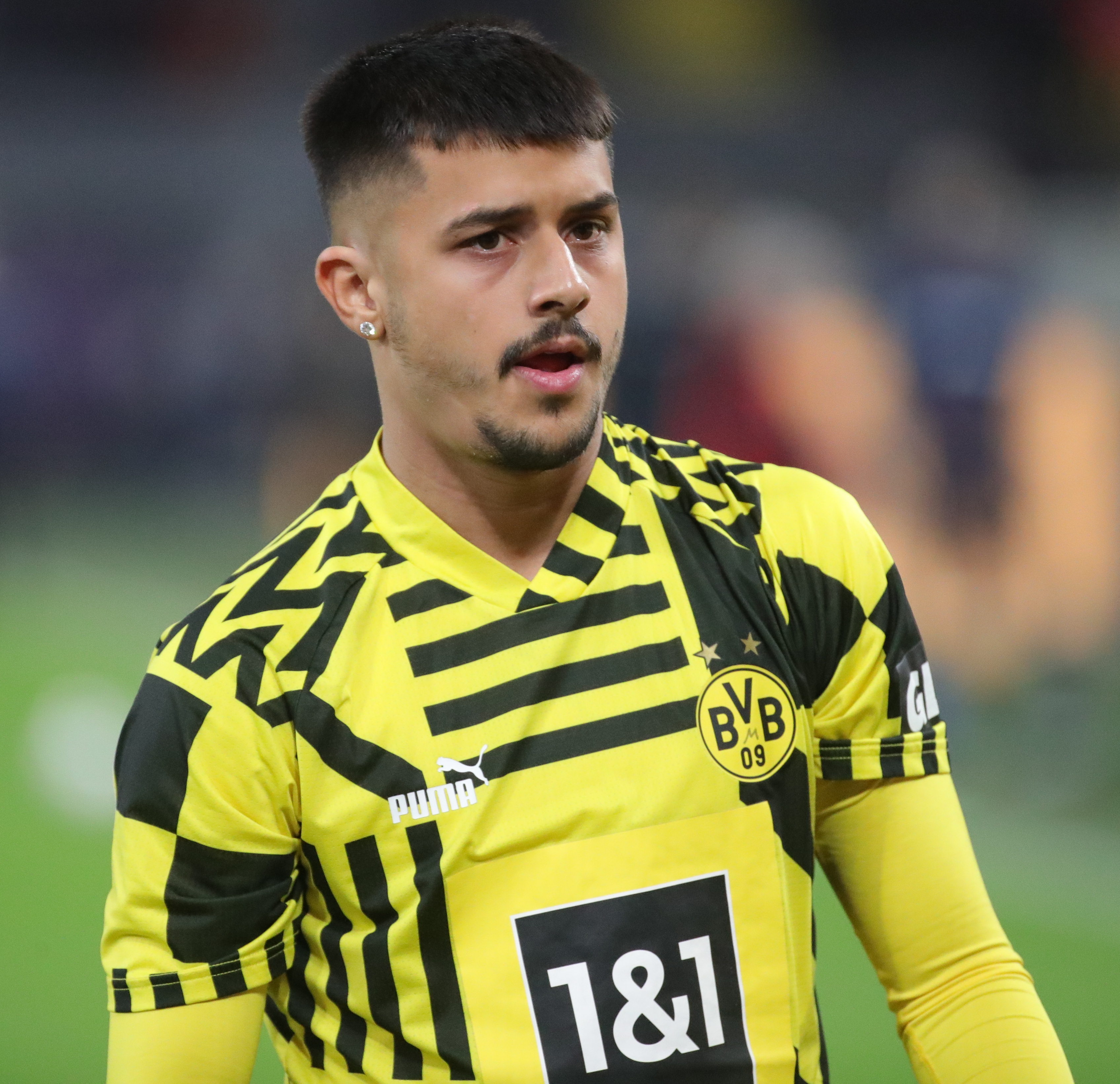
- Semić in 2022

Personal information
- Date of birth: 13 September 2003 (age 23)
- Place of birth: Fritzlar, Germany
- Height: 1.80 m (5 ft 11 in)
- Position: Right-back

Team information
- Current team: Greifswalder FC (on loan from VfL Osnabrück)
- Number: 11

Youth career
- FSG Gudensberg
- KSV Baunatal
- 2017–2022: Borussia Dortmund

Senior career*
Years	Team	Apps	(Gls)
2022	Borussia Dortmund	1	(0)
2022–2024	Borussia Dortmund II	25	(1)
2024–	VfL Osnabrück	14	(0)
2025–2026	→ Helmond Sport (loan)	14	(1)
2026–	→ Greifswalder FC (loan)	10	(0)

International career
2018–2019	Germany U16	7	(1)
2019–2020	Germany U17	10	(1)
2020	Germany U18	2	(0)
2021–2022	Germany U19	3	(0)
- * Club domestic league appearances and goals as of 23 September 2026

Lion Semić (born 13 September 2003) is a German professional footballer who plays as a right-back for Regionalliga Nordost club Greifswalder FC, on loan from VfL Osnabrück.

== Club career ==
=== Early life ===
Born in Fritzlar, Germany, Semić started playing football at the age of five with FSG Gudensberg. He joined the youth academy of Borussia Dortmund in 2017 from KSV Baunatal.

=== VfL Osnabrück ===
On 31 May 2024, Semić signed with VfL Osnabrück in 3. Liga.

On 28 August 2025, he was loaned to Helmond Sport in the Netherlands, with an option to buy.

== International career ==
Semić has represented Germany at numerous youth levels. He is also eligible to represent Bosnia and Herzegovina.

== Career statistics ==
As of match played 16 April 2022

Appearances and goals by club, season and competition
Club	Season	League			Cup		Continental		Other		Total	
Club	Season	Division	Apps	Goals	Apps	Goals	Apps	Goals	Apps	Goals	Apps	Goals
Borussia Dortmund	2021–22	Bundesliga	1	0	0	0	0	0	0	0	1	0
Career total			1	0	0	0	0	0	0	0	1	0
