= Jakub Jakubov =

Slovak football goalkeeper (born 1989)

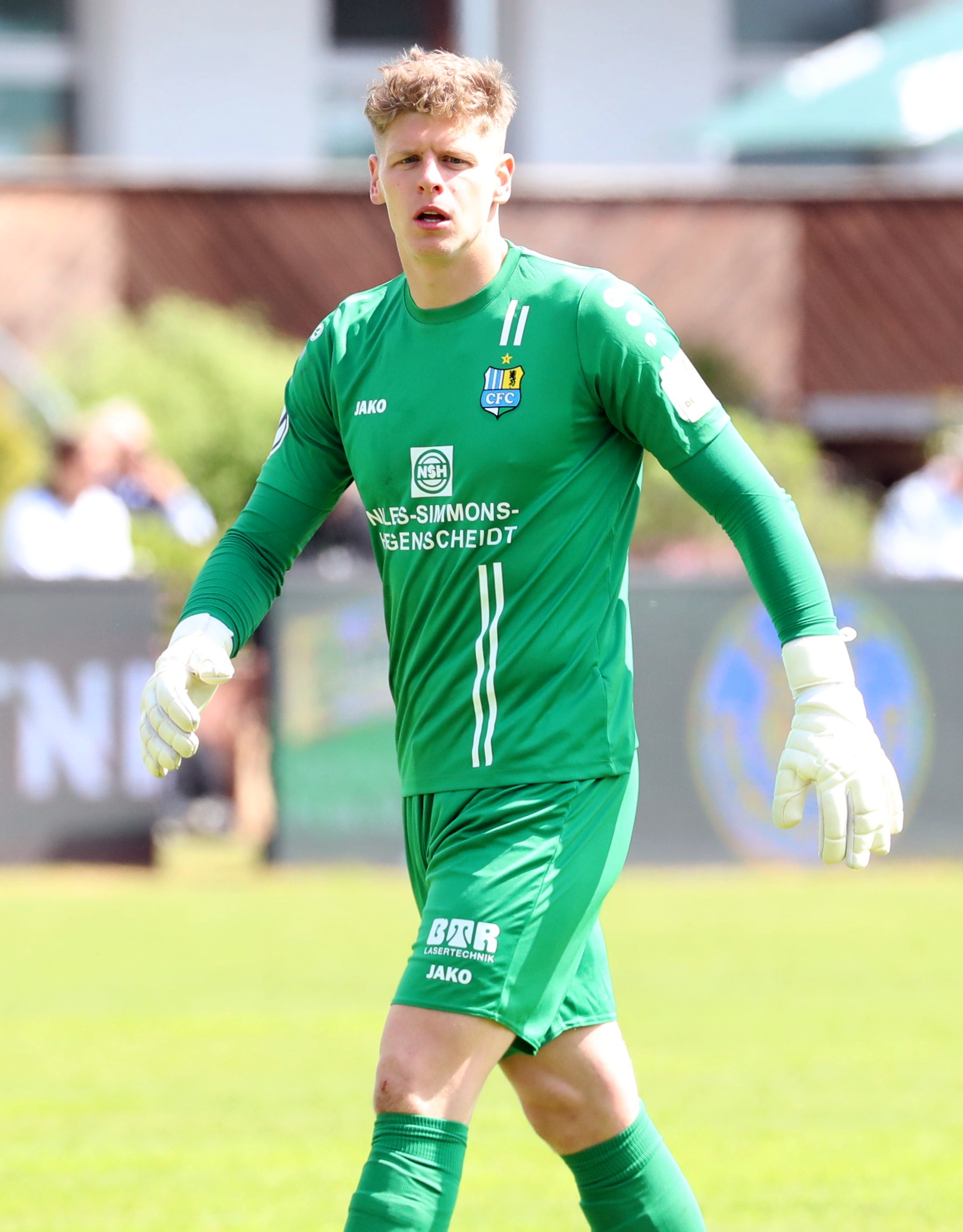

Personal information
- Full name: Jakub Jakubov
- Date of birth: 1 February 1989 (age 37)
- Place of birth: Košice, Czechoslovakia
- Height: 1.93 m (6 ft 4 in)
- Position: Goalkeeper

Team information
- Current team: Greifswalder FC
- Number: 1

Youth career
- 1996–2001: Košice
- 2001–2003: Lokomotíva Košice
- 2003–2004: SV Horn
- 2004–2008: Austria Wien

Senior career*
Years	Team	Apps	(Gls)
2008–2009	Austria Wien Amateure	3	(0)
2009–2011	Dukla Prague	2	(0)
2010	→ Táborsko (loan)		
2011	→ Kladno (loan)	15	(0)
2011–2012	Mladá Boleslav	0	(0)
2012–2013	FK Slavoj Žatec		
2013	→ Spartak Trnava (loan)	4	(0)
2013–2014	BFC Viktoria 1889	9	(0)
2014–2016	Budissa Bautzen	62	(0)
2016–2018	Berliner AK 07	59	(0)
2018–2023	Chemnitzer FC	132	(0)
2023–	Greifswalder FC	98	(0)
- * Club domestic league appearances and goals as of 23 September 2026

Jakub Jakubov (born 1 February 1989) is a Slovak footballer who plays as a goalkeeper for German club Greifswalder FC.

He was named in Czech squad for the 2009 FIFA U-20 World Cup but did not take part in any matches at the tournament.
