= Arkadiusz Czarnecki =

Polish footballer (born 1987)

Personal information
- Date of birth: 10 July 1987 (age 39)
- Place of birth: Olsztyn, Poland
- Height: 1.86 m (6 ft 1 in)
- Position: Centre-back

Youth career
- Naki Olsztyn
- 2002–2003: Stomil Olsztyn

Senior career*
Years	Team	Apps	(Gls)
2003	Polonia Olimpia Elbląg		
2004–2007	Lech Poznań	4	(0)
2008	Flota Świnoujście	11	(2)
2008–2009	Elana Toruń	27	(4)
2009–2010	Ruch Wysokie Mazowieckie	39	(5)
2011	KSZO Ostrowiec	12	(0)
2011–2013	Elana Toruń	48	(3)
2013–2014	Sandecja Nowy Sącz	33	(2)
2014–2016	Stomil Olsztyn	64	(1)
2016	Bytovia Bytów	8	(0)
2016–2017	Stomil Olsztyn	24	(3)
2017–2018	Pogoń Siedlce	17	(0)
2018–2020	Greifswalder FC	41	(0)
2021	Flota Świnoujście	3	(0)
2023–2026	SV Siedenbollentin	64	(1)

International career
2006	Poland U19	3	(0)
- * Club domestic league appearances and goals

Arkadiusz Czarnecki (born 10 July 1987) is a Polish former professional footballer who played as a centre-back.

== Career ==
Czarnecki was born in Olsztyn. In February 2011 he signed a one-year contract with KSZO Ostrowiec.

== Honours ==
Lech Poznań

- Polish Cup: 2003–04

Flota Świnoujście

- III liga, group II: 2007–08
