= Filipe Godinho =

Portuguese footballer

Personal information
- Full name: Filipe André Pereira Godinho
- Date of birth: 8 September 1989 (age 37)
- Place of birth: Amadora, Portugal
- Height: 1.72 m (5 ft 8 in)
- Position: Right-back

Youth career
- 1998–1999: Olivais Moscavide
- 1999–2001: Belenenses
- 2001–2002: Real Massamá
- 2002–2003: Olivais Moscavide
- 2003–2008: Belenenses

Senior career*
Years	Team	Apps	(Gls)
2008–2012	Sacavenense	50	(16)
2009	→ Odivelas (loan)	1	(0)
2010	→ Real Massamá (loan)	7	(0)
2012–2013	1º Dezembro	29	(7)
2013	Chojniczanka	6	(0)
2014	Loures	14	(1)
2014–2015	Mafra	12	(0)
2015	Casa Pia	14	(2)
2015–2017	Cova Piedade	53	(6)
2017–2019	Farense	62	(0)
2019–2020	Alverca	7	(0)
2020	Lusitânia	5	(0)
2021	Olímpico Montijo	11	(0)
Total		271	(32)

International career
2007	Portugal U18	2	(0)
- * Club domestic league appearances and goals

Filipe André Pereira Godinho (born 8 September 1989) is a Portuguese former professional footballer who played mainly as a right-back.

== Club career ==
Born in Amadora, Lisbon District, Godinho spent the vast majority of his senior career in the lower leagues or amateur football. His professional input in his homeland consisted of one LigaPro season apiece with C.D. Cova da Piedade and S.C. Farense. On 30 April 2016, while at the service of the former club, he scored in a 2–1 home win against S.C. Angrense that sealed promotion to the second division for the first time ever.

In the summer of 2013, Godinho signed with Chojniczanka Chojnice of the Polish I liga, but returned to Portugal in the following transfer window after agreeing to a contract at GS Loures. He scored his only goal in the Portuguese second tier on 11 March 2017 as a Cova da Piedade player, but in a 2–1 away loss to S.C. Olhanense.

== International career ==
Godinho represented Portugal at under-18 level.
