= Patrícia Godinho Gomes =

Bissau-Guinean historian and academic (born 1972)

- Born: 26 June 1972 (age 54)
- Citizenship: Guinea-Bissau
- Education: Technical University of Lisbon University of Cagliari
- Occupations: Historian; academic

Patrícia Godinho Gomes (born 26 June 1972) is a Bissau-Guinean historian and academic whose research studies the role of women in anticolonial resistance, African feminisms and gender in Lusophone countries with a particular focus on Guinea-Bissau and Cape Verde.

== Biography ==
Gomes was born in Angola on 26 June 1972. She grew up in Guinea-Bissau. She studied in Portugal at the Technical University of Lisbon and graduated in 1995 with a degree in Political Science, with a specialization in African Studies. She studied for her doctorate at the University of Cagliari and graduated in 2002. From 2006 to 2010, she held a post-doctoral fellowship at the same university. From 2014 to 2018, Gomes researched and taught Ethnic and African Studies at the Federal University of Bahia. As of 2020 she was an Associate Researcher at the National Institute of Studies and Research in Guinea-Bissau. She was alternate member of the Executive Committee of the Council for the Development of Research in Social Sciences in Africa (CODESRIA), a member of the National Institute of Studies and Research (INEP) and a member of the African Borderland Network (ABORNE). She collaborated on the Biographies of African Women database, hosted by the Federal University of Bahia.

The experience of women in Lusophone countries in Africa and their anti-colonial resistance is central to her research. In 2017, Gomes worked on a comparative research project, which examined the experiences of African and Afro-Brazilian women from a global south perspective. Since both Guinea-Bissau and Brazil were Portuguese colonies, examining how the colonial legacies on gender differ is an important research topic. She has also worked on the role that women from Guine-Bissau have played in intellectual production in the country. In 2019. she lectured on women, pan-Africanism and Marxism at the Faculty of Law of UFBA. She is an expert on the life of Teodora Inácia Gomes.

== Selected publications ==
- Encontros e desencontros de lá e de cá do Atlântico: mulheres africanas e afro-brasileiras em perspectivas de gênero (SciELO-EDUFBA, 2017).
- 'A Mulher guineense como sujeito e objecto do debate histórico contemporâneo: Excertos da história de vida de Teodora Inácia Gomes' Africa Development (2016).
- 'A importância das Forças Armadas Revolucionárias do Povo (F.A.R.P.) na luta pela libertação da Guiné-Bissau' Poiésis (2010).
