= Luděk Frydrych =

Czech footballer

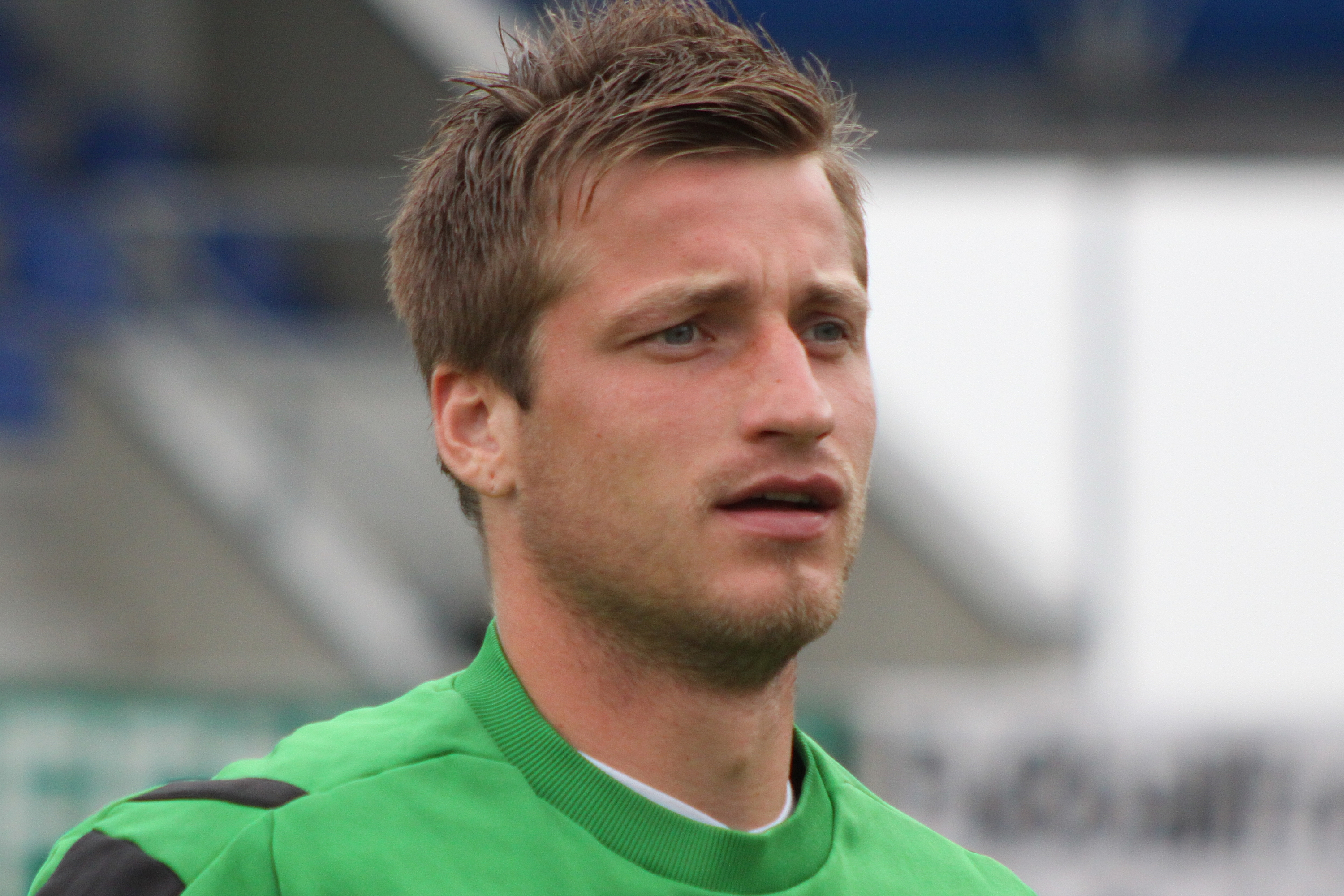

Personal information
- Full name: Luděk Frydrych
- Date of birth: 3 January 1987 (age 39)
- Place of birth: Chlumec nad Cidlinou, Czechoslovakia
- Height: 1.83 m (6 ft 0 in)
- Position: Goalkeeper

Team information
- Current team: Olympia
- Number: 22

Youth career
- 1996–1998: Kunčice
- 1998–2006: Hradec Králové

Senior career*
Years	Team	Apps	(Gls)
2006–2008	Hradec Králové		
2009	→ Čáslav (loan)		
2009–2012	Jablonec	2	(0)
2011	→ Vlašim (loan)	15	(0)
2011	→ Vlašim (loan)	1	(0)
2012–2016	Pardubice		
2016–	Olympia		
- * Club domestic league appearances and goals as of 31 December 2011

Luděk Frydrych (born 3 January 1987 in Chlumec nad Cidlinou) is a Czech professional football goalkeeper who currently plays for Olympia Prague.

== Honours ==
Czech Rupublic U-21

- FIFA U-20 World Cup runner-up (1) 2007
