= Filipe Leão =

Portuguese footballer (born 1983)

Personal information
- Full name: Filipe Joaquim Gonçalves Andrade Ponce de Leão
- Date of birth: 13 November 1983 (age 42)
- Place of birth: Lisbon, Portugal
- Height: 1.88 m (6 ft 2 in)
- Position: Goalkeeper

Youth career
- 1994–1998: Benfica
- 1998–1999: Estoril
- 1999–2002: Estrela Amadora

Senior career*
| Years | Team | Apps | (Gls) |
| 2002–2003 | Estrela Amadora | 4 | (0) |
| 2003–2004 | Farense | 13 | (0) |
| 2004 | Marco | 0 | (0) |
| 2004–2007 | Mafra | 72 | (0) |
| 2007–2008 | Atlético | 30 | (0) |
| 2008–2010 | Estoril | 5 | (0) |
| 2010–2011 | Fátima | 10 | (0) |
| 2011 | Oriental | 11 | (0) |
| 2011–2012 | Torreense | 20 | (0) |
| 2012–2014 | Atlético | 53 | (0) |
| 2014–2016 | Mafra | 44 | (0) |
| 2016–2018 | Sintrense | 39 | (0) |
| 2018–2019 | Loures | 34 | (0) |
| 2019–2020 | Sintra Football | 25 | (0) |
| 2020–2021 | Estrela Amadora | 29 | (0) |
| Total | | 389 | (0) |
- * Club domestic league appearances and goals

Filipe Joaquim Gonçalves Andrade Ponce de Leão (born 13 November 1983 in Lisbon) is a Portuguese former professional footballer who played as a goalkeeper.
