= Butrint Vishaj =

Austrian–born ethnic Albanian footballer (born 1987)

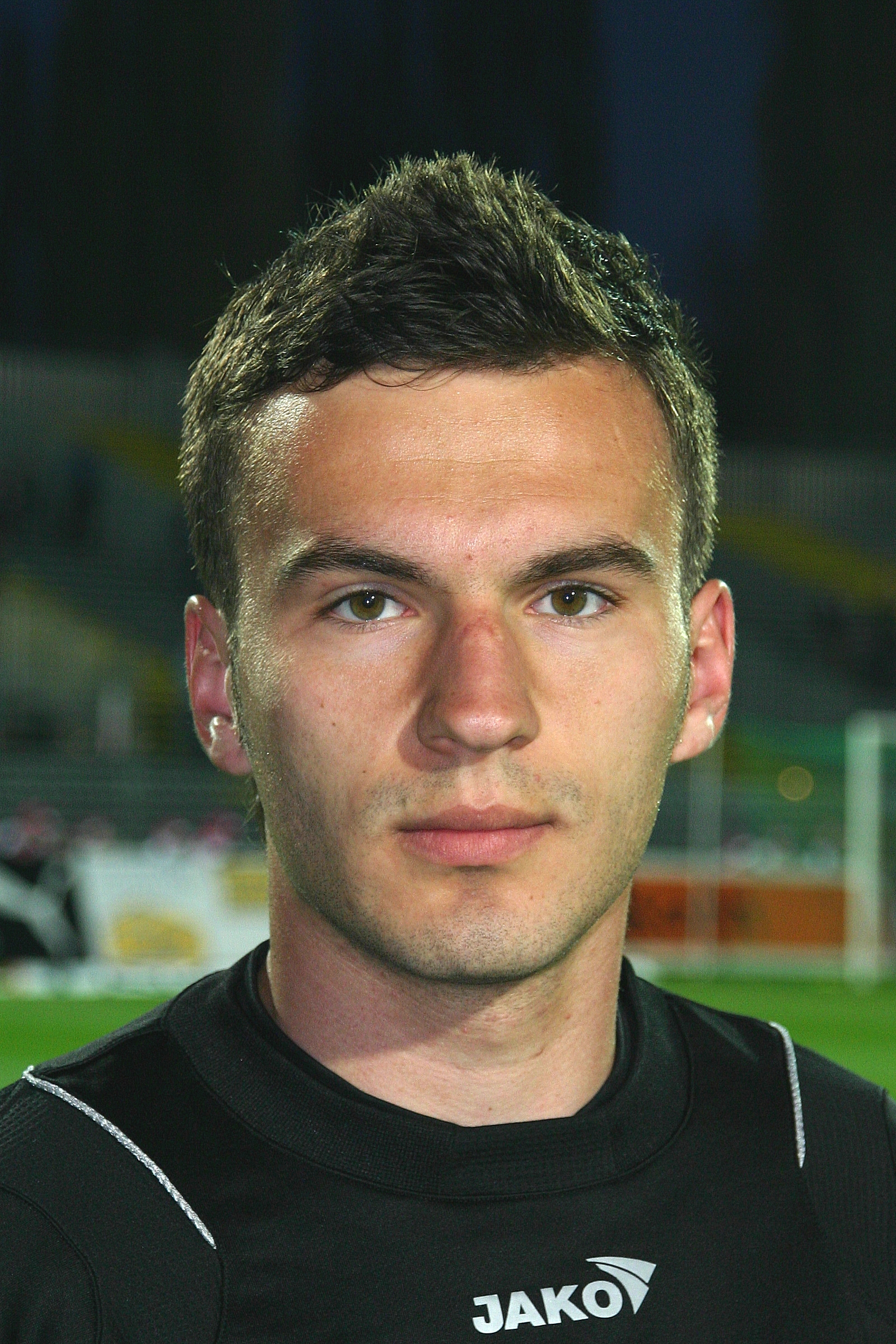
- Vishaj in 2009

Personal information
- Date of birth: 9 July 1987 (age 39)
- Place of birth: Neunkirchen, Austria
- Height: 1.81 m (5 ft 11 in)
- Position: Midfielder

Team information
- Current team: ASK Horitschon

Youth career
- 1994–2000: SV Grünbach
- 2000–2004: BNZ Mödling

Senior career*
Years	Team	Apps	(Gls)
2004–2006	Admira Wacker II	36	(5)
2004–2007	Admira Wacker	26	(3)
2007–2008	SC Schwanenstadt	23	(4)
2008–2010	Rheindorf Altach	26	(3)
2009–2010	Rheindorf Altach II	9	(6)
2010–2011	Skënderbeu Korçë	24	(2)
2011–2012	Kastrioti Krujë	0	(0)
2012	SC Ritzing	14	(3)
2012–2013	1. SC Sollenau	9	(0)
2013–2014	SC Röthis	21	(13)
2014–	ASK Horitschon	21	(7)

International career
2004–2006	Austria U17	10	(?)
2007	Austria U19	1	(0)
2008–2009	Austria U21	6	(0)
- * Club domestic league appearances and goals

Butrint Vishaj (born 9 July 1987 in Neunkirchen) is an Austrian–born ethnic Albanian footballer who plays for ASK Horitschon in the Landesliga Burgenland, the fourth tier of Austrian football.

== Career ==
=== Early career ===
Vishaj was born to ethnic Albanian Kosovan parents in Neunkirchen, Austria, where he was also raised. He began playing football for SV Grünbach in 1994 where he would play until 2000. He moved to the BNZ Mödling football academy in 2000 after scouts had spotted the youngster.

== Honours ==
=== Skënderbeu Korçë ===
- Albanian Superliga (1): 2010-11
