= Kamil Stachyra =

Polish footballer

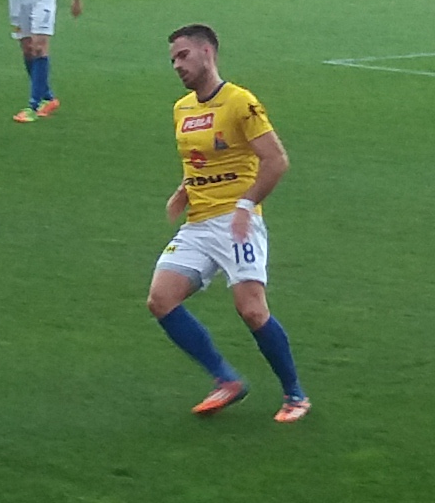
- Stachyra with Motor Lublin in 2017

Personal information
- Date of birth: 23 May 1987 (age 39)
- Place of birth: Lublin, Poland
- Height: 1.75 m (5 ft 9 in)
- Position: Midfielder

Youth career
- KS Lublinianka

Senior career*
Years	Team	Apps	(Gls)
2003	Legion Lublin		
2003–2006	Motor Lublin		
2006–2007	Górnik Łęczna	9	(1)
2007–2008	Motor Lublin	17	(1)
2008–2010	Górnik/Bogdanka Łęczna	26	(1)
2008–2011	Górnik/Bogdanka Łęczna II	30	(11)
2011	Flota Świnoujście	10	(0)
2012	Stal Rzeszów	28	(5)
2013–2017	Motor Lublin	107	(21)
2017	JKS 1909 Jarosław	16	(3)
2019	Chełmianka Chełm	4	(0)
- * Club domestic league appearances and goals

Kamil Stachyra (born 23 May 1987) is a Polish former professional footballer who played as a midfielder. He formerly played for Górnik Łęczna, Flota Świnoujście, Stal Rzeszów, Motor Lublin, and JKS 1909 Jarosław.

== Career ==
Stachyra began his career at KS Lublinianka. On 12 August 2006, he made his professional debut for Górnik Łęczna. On 10 October 2013, it was announced that Stachyra had signed with II liga side Motor Lublin.

In August 2017, Stachyra moved to JKS 1909 Jarosław.

== Honours ==
Motor Lublin

- III liga Lublin–Subcarpathia: 2015–16
