= Christian Person =

German footballer

Personal information
- Date of birth: 26 December 1980 (age 45)
- Place of birth: Greifswald, East Germany
- Height: 1.95 m (6 ft 5 in)
- Position: Goalkeeper

Youth career
- Greifswalder SC

Senior career*
Years	Team	Apps	(Gls)
1998–2002	Greifswalder SC	35	(0)
2002–2004	Hertha BSC II	2	(0)
2004–2005	1. FC Magdeburg	18	(0)
2005–2008	FC Carl Zeiss Jena	50	(0)
2008	Dynamo Dresden	4	(0)
2009	Hallescher FC	0	(0)
2009–2013	VFC Plauen	121	(0)
2013–2015	Pommern Greifswald		
2015–2018	Greifswalder FC		
- * Club domestic league appearances and goals

Christian Person (born 26 December 1980) is a German former professional association footballer who played as a goalkeeper.

== Career ==
Person played for Hertha BSC, 1. FC Magdeburg, FC Carl Zeiss Jena, Dynamo Dresden and Hallescher FC. He had a trial with Scottish Premier League club Hibernian in August 2008.
