= Carsten Nulle =

German footballer (born 1975)

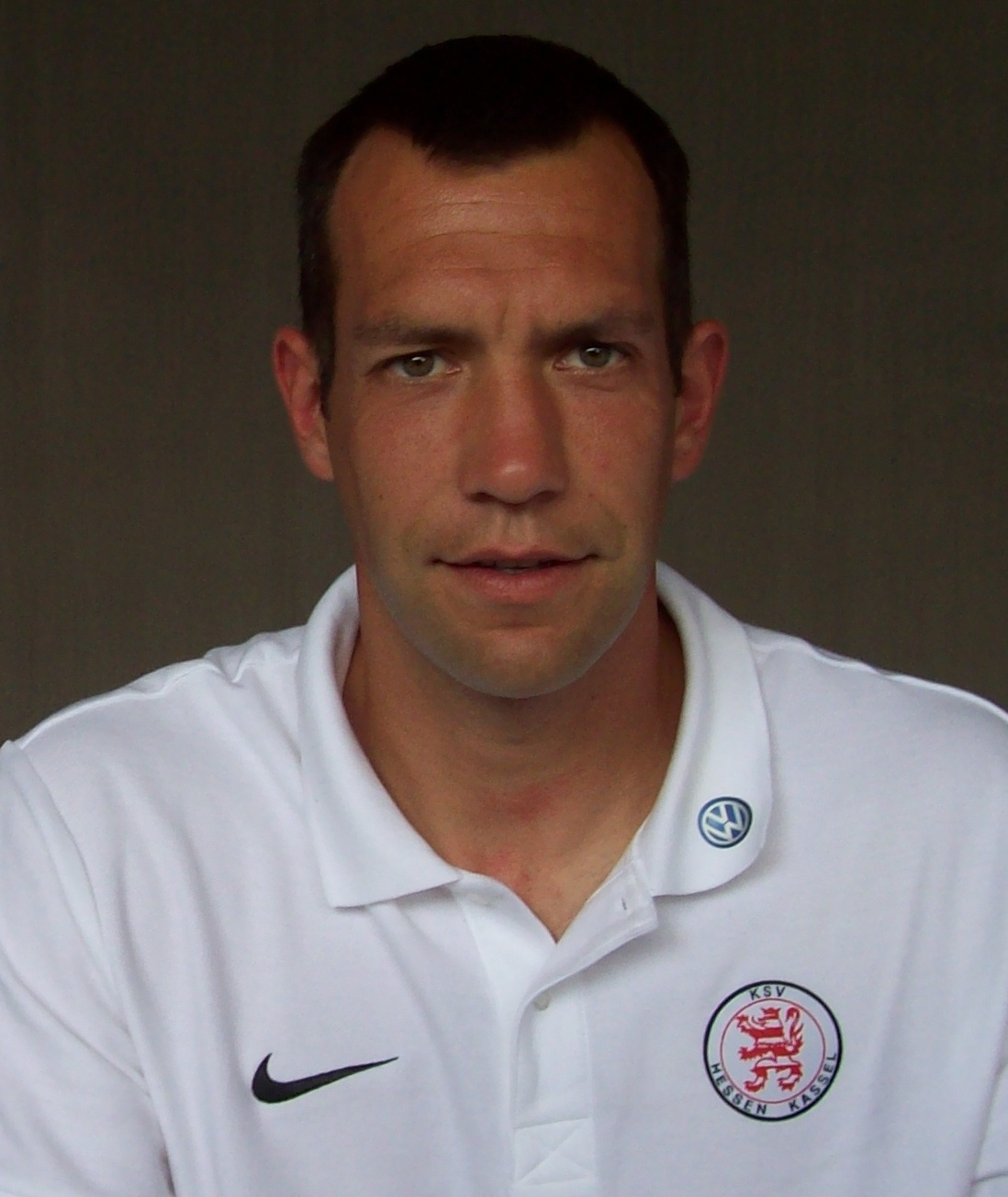
- Nulle in 2012

Personal information
- Date of birth: 25 July 1975 (age 51)
- Place of birth: Langen, West Germany
- Height: 1.90 m (6 ft 3 in)
- Position: Goalkeeper

Youth career
- –1988: SKG Sprendlingen
- 1988–1994: Eintracht Frankfurt
- 1994–1995: Rot-Weiß Walldorf

Senior career*
Years	Team	Apps	(Gls)
1995–1996	FV Bad Vilbel	8	(0)
1996–1997	FSV Frankfurt	20	(0)
1998–1999	SG Egelsbach	29	(0)
1999	Viktoria Aschaffenburg	19	(0)
1999–2001	SV Sandhausen	53	(0)
2001–2003	Waldhof Mannheim	47	(0)
2003–2004	Rot-Weiß Oberhausen	0	(0)
2004–2006	Fortuna Düsseldorf	26	(0)
2006	Górnik Zabrze	7	(0)
2006–2007	SC Freiburg	11	(0)
2008	SC Paderborn	3	(0)
2008–2011	Carl Zeiss Jena	109	(1)
2012–2014	Hessen Kassel	56	(0)
2014	Wormatia Worms	9	(0)
Total		397	(1)

Managerial career
- 2013–2014: Hessen Kassel (player-manager)
- 2014: FC Magdeburg (goalkeeper coach)
- 2015–2017: Preußen Münster (goalkeeper coach)
- 2017–2018: BFC Dynamo (goalkeeper coach)
- 2018–2019: Ingolstadt 04 (goalkeeper coach)
- 2020–2021: Selangor (goalkeeper coach)
- 2021–2023: Preußen Münster (goalkeeper coach)
- 2023–2024: BFC Dynamo (goalkeeper coach)
- * Club domestic league appearances and goals

Carsten Nulle (born 25 July 1975) is a German former professional footballer who played as a goalkeeper.

== Career ==
Nulle was born in Langen, Hesse. He was the second German player to play in the Polish Ekstraklasa, after joining Górnik Zabrze in 2006. Nulle made his debut for Freiburg on 29 April 2007, in a 3–2 win at Kickers Offenbach. In January 2008 he moved to SC Paderborn 07 and in July 2008 to FC Carl Zeiss Jena where he scored his first professional goal in the match against VfL Osnabrück on 20 February 2010.
