= Artur Marciniak =

Polish footballer

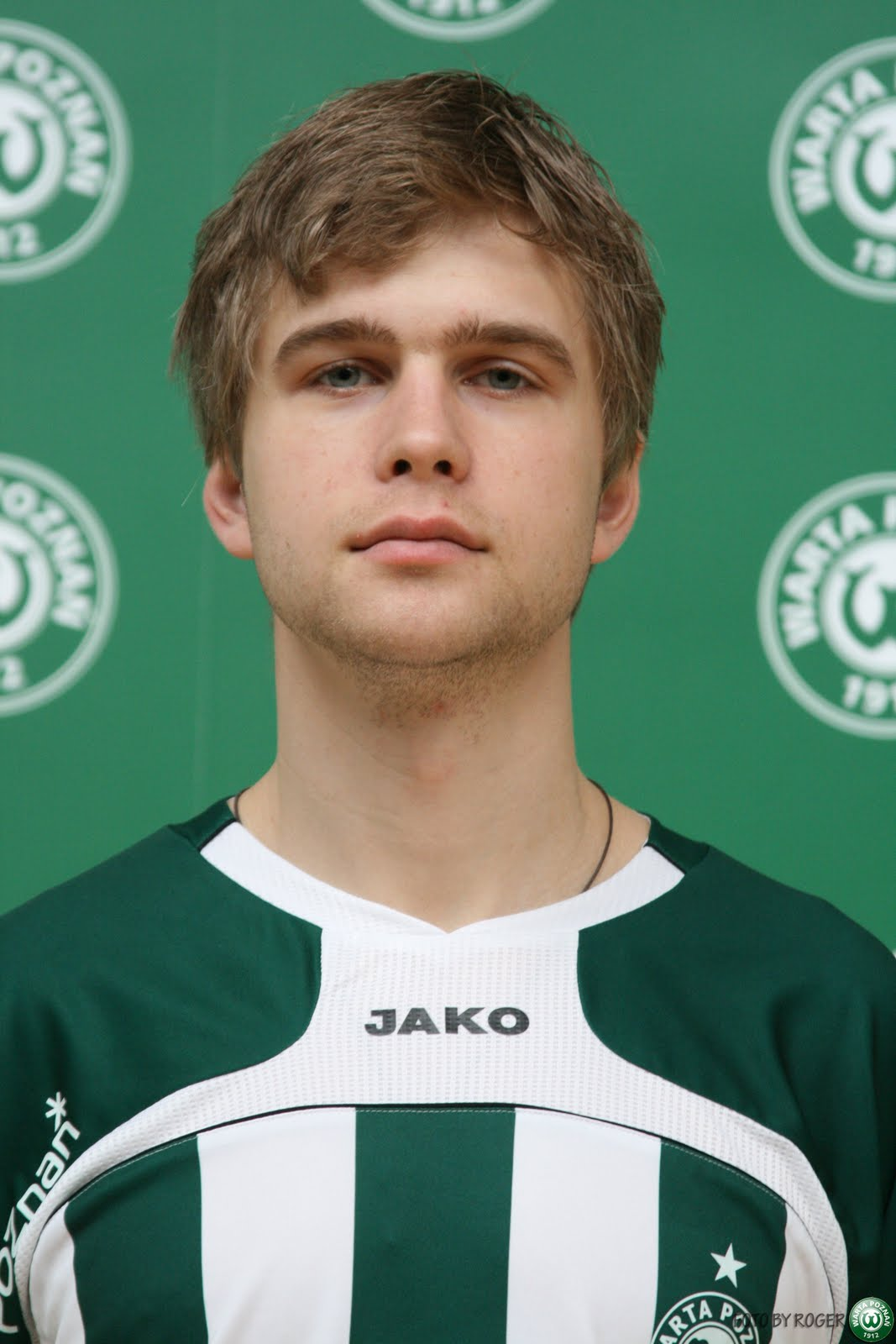

Personal information
- Full name: Artur Andrzej Marciniak
- Date of birth: 18 August 1987 (age 39)
- Place of birth: Poznań, Poland
- Height: 1.78 m (5 ft 10 in)
- Position: Midfielder

Youth career
- Poznaniak Poznań

Senior career*
Years	Team	Apps	(Gls)
2004–2007	Lech Poznań	19	(0)
2007–2008	→ GKS Bełchatów (loan)	4	(0)
2008–2010	GKS Bełchatów	7	(0)
2010	→ Warta Poznań (loan)	11	(0)
2011–2012	Warta Poznań	52	(2)
2013	Miedź Legnica	11	(0)
2013–2020	Warta Poznań	113	(7)
2020–2022	Lech Poznań II	38	(0)
Total		255	(9)

International career
2007	Poland U20	4	(0)
- * Club domestic league appearances and goals

Artur Andrzej Marciniak (born 18 August 1987) is a Polish former professional footballer who played as a midfielder.

== Club career ==
In January 2011, he joined Warta Poznań on a half-year deal.

== International career ==
Marciniak was a Poland youth international. He was the captain of the Poland U20s during the 2007 FIFA U-20 World Cup.

== Personal life ==
Marciniak is married and has six children. Following retirement, he began work in the IT industry, and became an extraordinary minister of Holy Communion.

== Honours ==
Warta Poznań

- III liga Kuyavia-Pomerania–Greater Poland: 2014–15, 2015–16
