= Michael Zaglmair =

Austrian footballer

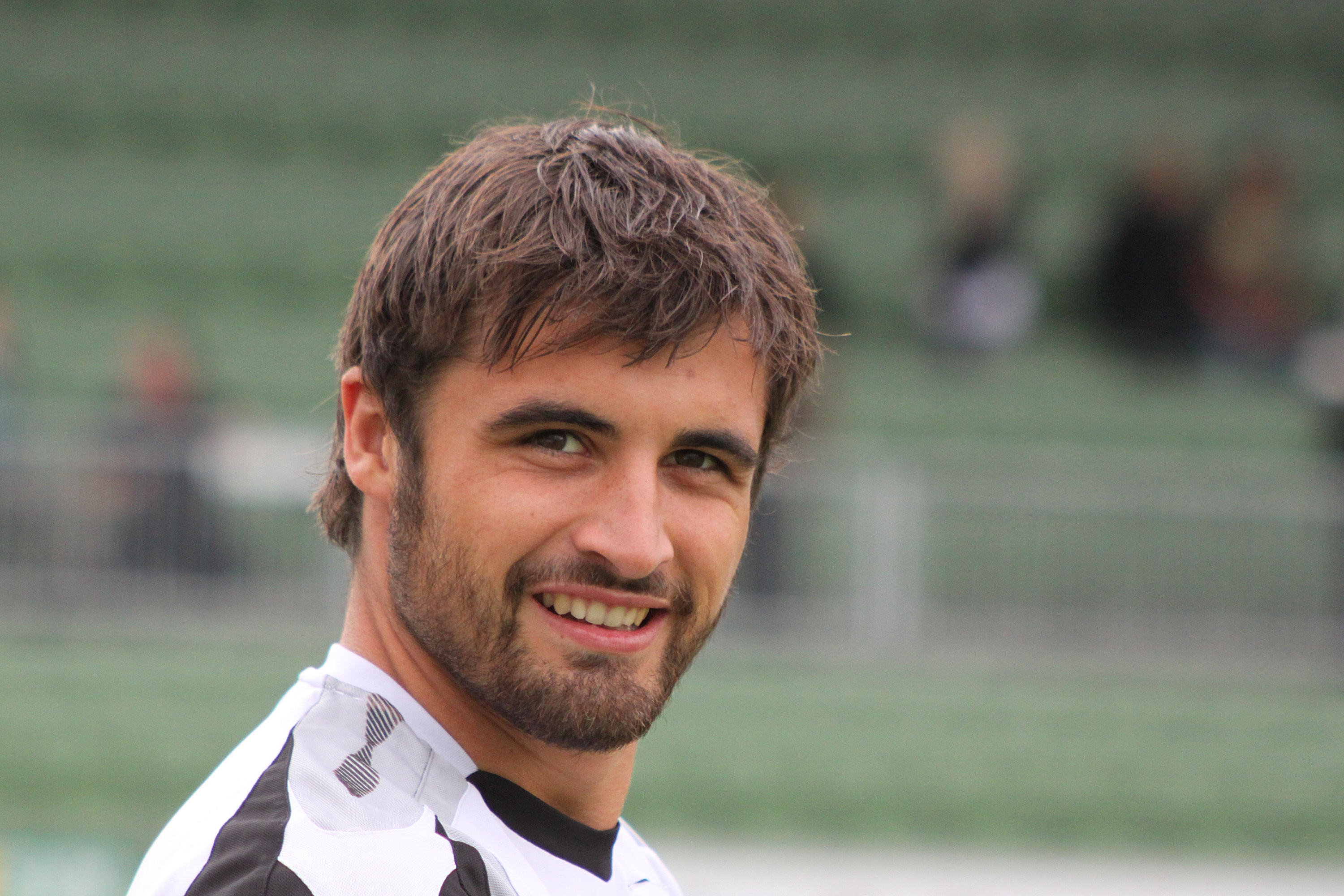

Personal information
- Full name: Michael Zaglmair
- Date of birth: December 7, 1987 (age 38)
- Place of birth: Austria
- Height: 1.84 m (6 ft 0 in)
- Position: Goalkeeper

Youth career
- Blau-Weiß Linz
- LASK
- Union Lembach

Senior career*
Years	Team	Apps	(Gls)
2005–2010	LASK Linz	28	(0)
2005	→ Blau-Weiß Linz (loan)	0	(0)
2011–2012	SV Horn	19	(0)
2012–2017	TV Geiselhöring		

International career
2006	Austria U-19	5	(0)
2007–2008	Austria U-20	9	(0)
- * Club domestic league appearances and goals

Michael Zaglmair (born 7 December 1987) is a former Austrian football goalkeeper.

== Club career ==
He made his Austrian Bundesliga debut on 26 October 2007 against Rapid Vienna.

== International career ==
He was part of the Austria U-21 team at the 2007 FIFA U-20 World Cup in Canada, appearing in four matches during the tournament and helping his team to reach the semi-finals.
