= Igor Araújo (footballer) =

Portuguese footballer

Personal information
- Full name: Igor Diogo Moreira Araújo
- Date of birth: 4 February 1987 (age 39)
- Place of birth: Felgueiras, Portugal
- Height: 1.89 m (6 ft 2 in)
- Position: Goalkeeper

Youth career
- 1995–2006: Porto
- 2002–2003: → Padroense (loan)

Senior career*
Years	Team	Apps	(Gls)
2006–2026	Covilhã	167	(0)
2019–2026	Covilhã B	12	(0)
Total		179	(0)

International career
2002–2003	Portugal U16	9	(0)
2003–2004	Portugal U17	11	(0)
2004–2005	Portugal U18	6	(0)
2005–2006	Portugal U19	13	(0)
2006–2007	Portugal U20	3	(0)
- * Club domestic league appearances and goals

Igor Diogo Moreira Araújo (born 4 February 1987) is a Portuguese former professional footballer who played as a goalkeeper.

== Club career ==
Born in Felgueiras, Porto District, Araújo spent his entire career with S.C. Covilhã after being developed at FC Porto. He played several seasons with the club in the Segunda Liga, mostly as a backup.

Araújo retired at the end of the 2025–26 campaign aged 39, with the side now in the Liga 3.

== International career ==
Araújo was part of the Portugal squad at the 2007 FIFA U-20 World Cup, making no appearances in Canada.

== See also ==
- List of one-club men
