= Maria Godinho =

Portuguese materials scientist

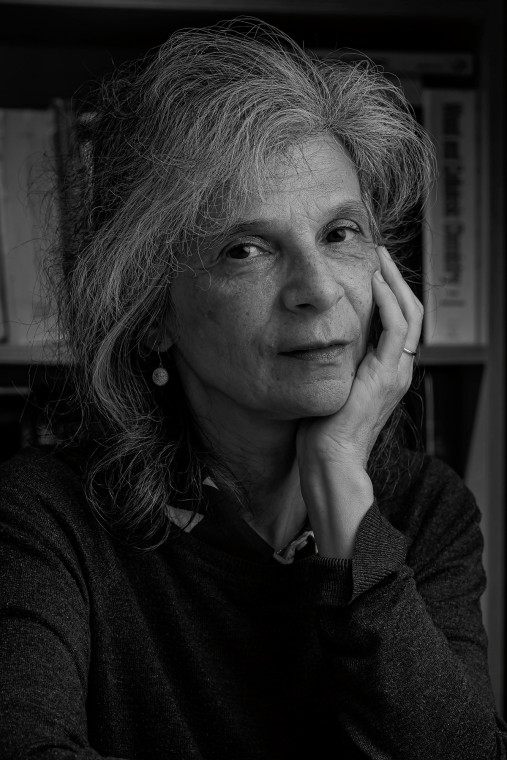
Godinho in 2025

Maria Helena Figueiredo Godinho is a Portuguese materials scientist whose research focuses on cellulose based liquid crystals. She is a professor of materials science at NOVA University of Lisbon, and president of the International Liquid Crystal Society.

== Education and career ==
Godinho received a licenciate in chemical engineering from the Instituto Superior Técnico of the University of Lisbon in 1983. She continued her studies for a 1986 master's degree, a 1992 doctorate, and a 2003 habilitation, all from NOVA University of Lisbon.

She worked as a teaching assistant at the University of Beira Interior from 1983 to 1985, and at NOVA University of Lisbon from 1985 to 1992. She became an assistant professor at NOVA University of Lisbon, in its Institute of Nanostructures, Nanomodelling and Nanofabrication (i3n), from 1992 until 2018, when she was promoted to associate professor in the faculty of sciences and technology. In 2024, she was promoted again, to full professor.

She was elected as president of the International Liquid Crystal Society in 2024.

== Recognition ==
Godinho received the Frederiks Medal of the Russian Liquid Crystal Society in 2019, and the Lars Onsager Professorship and Medal of the Norwegian University of Science and Technology in 2023. She was elected as a foreign member of the Norwegian Academy of Science and Letters in 2024.
