= Henriqueta Godinho Gomes =

Bissau-Guinean political leader (1942–2018)

Henriqueta Godinho Gomes (née Pinto da Silva; 1942 – 6 August 2018) was a Bissau-Guinean political leader.

Gomes was active in the African Party for the Independence of Guinea and Cape Verde for some time. Between 1998 and 1993, she served as the minister of social affairs and public health; from 1993 until 1994 she served as minister of labour.
