= Hagen Reeck =

German football coach and manager

Personal information
- Date of birth: 6 September 1959 (age 67)
- Place of birth: Wolfen, East Germany
- Position: Forward

Youth career
- Energie Cottbus

Senior career*
| Years | Team | Apps | (Gls) |
- Dynamo Cottbus
| 1981–1986 | Energie Cottbus | 10 | (0) |

Managerial career
- 1990–2004: Energie Cottbus (assistant)
- 2005–2006: Al-Nasr SC (assistant)
- 2008–2010: Apollon Limassol (assistant)
- 2012: Apollon Limassol
- 2012–2015: VFC Anklam
- 2015–2017: Greifswalder FC
- 2017–2018: Insel Usedom
- 2019–2020: SV Siedenbollentin
- * Club domestic league appearances and goals

Hagen Reeck (born 6 September 1959) is a German football manager and former player.
