= Solomon Grimes =

Liberian footballer (born 1987)

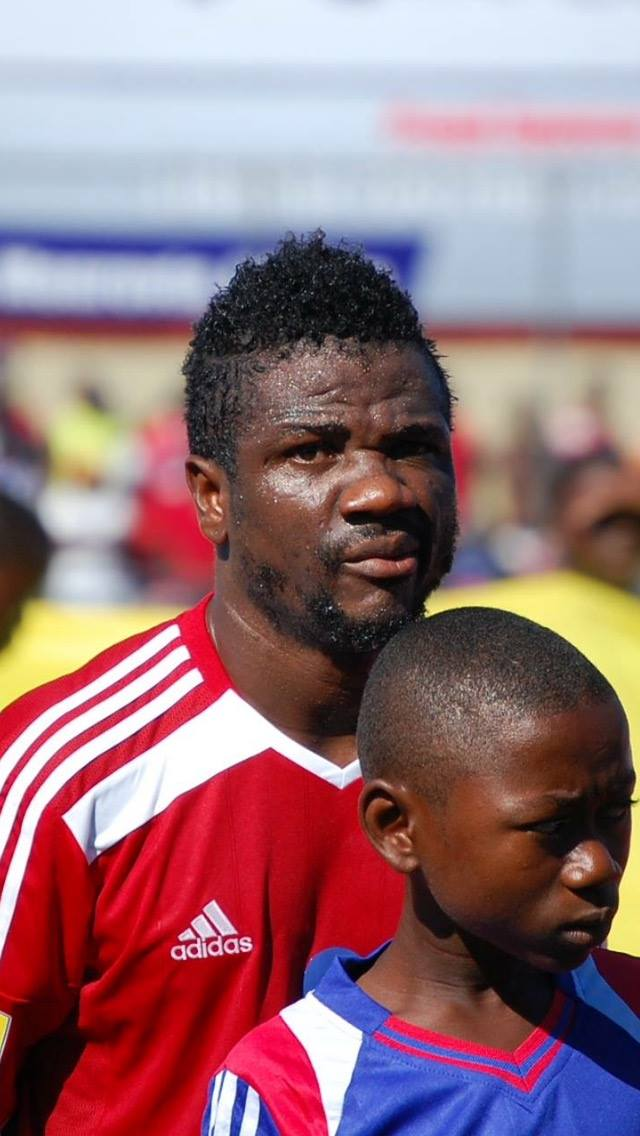

Personal information
- Full name: Solomon Grimes
- Date of birth: July 24, 1987 (age 39)
- Place of birth: Monrovia, Liberia
- Height: 1.77 m (5 ft 10 in)
- Position: Defender

Senior career*
Years	Team	Apps	(Gls)
2003–2007	Mighty Barolle	82	(7)
2007	LISCR FC	7	
2007–2011	Ethnikos Piraeus	92	(1)
2008	→ Kalamata (loan)	18	(0)
2011–2016	Nea Salamina	130	(0)

International career
2006	Liberia	46	(0)
- * Club domestic league appearances and goals

Solomon Grimes (born 24 July 1987) is a Liberian former professional footballer who last played for Nea Salamina in the Cypriot First Division in Cyprus.

== Early career ==
Grimes started his career with Liberian league side Mighty Barroe in 2003, spending six years with the club before moving on to Liberian top side LISCR FC in 2007. He joined Greek side Ethnikos Piraeus for the remainder of the 2007 season. Grimes was later loaned out for the 2008 season to another Greek side Kalamata where he made 18 appearances. He later rejoined Ethnikos Piraeus till the 2011 season, making 92 appearances. In 2011, Grimes joined Cypriot Club Nea Salamina where he played from 2011 to 2016.

== International career ==
Grimes gained his first call up against Gambia at the age of 17 in the 2004–2005 World Cup Qualification Round with the Liberia National Football Team and have gone on to make 38 appearances for the Nation and is one of the most experience players on the national team.
