= Silvio Schröter =

German footballer

Personal information
- Date of birth: 29 June 1979 (age 47)
- Place of birth: Radebeul, East Germany
- Height: 1.80 m (5 ft 11 in)
- Position: Midfielder

Youth career
- –1989: TSV 1862 Radeburg
- 1989–1997: Dynamo Dresden

Senior career*
Years	Team	Apps	(Gls)
1997–2001	Dynamo Dresden	111	(13)
2001–2003	Energie Cottbus	45	(1)
2003–2008	Hannover 96	68	(3)
2008–2009	MSV Duisburg	3	(0)
2009	Carl Zeiss Jena	6	(0)
Total		233	(17)

International career
2004	Germany Team 2006	1	(0)
- * Club domestic league appearances and goals

Silvio Schröter (born 29 June 1979) is a German professional footballer who played as a midfielder.

== Career ==
Born in Radebeul, Schröter began his career at his hometown club TSV 1862 Radeburg, before joining the youth ranks of Dynamo Dresden. He moved up to the senior squad in 1997 of the Regionalliga North-East side, gradually progressing within the club to being an almost ever-present in his final season.

He was then snapped up by newly promoted Bundesliga side Energie Cottbus in summer 2001. His Bundesliga debut came on 1 December 2001 in a 1–0 defeat at TSV 1860 Munich. Three games later, he scored what proved to be his sole goal for the club in a 5–2 defeat at Hamburger SV. Although the club managed to survive its first year at the top level, the following season saw the club finishing bottom.

This relegation was the cue for Schröter to move on as he agreed to join Hannover 96, signing a three-year deal in July 2003. Although, he was unable to make his Hannover debut until December due to a torn cruciate ligament from the previous April, he became a familiar face in the team after this. Injuries have often curtailed the winger's subsequent seasons appearances too.

In January 2008, he moved to MSV Duisburg, but left after six months, joining FC Carl Zeiss Jena. He was released by Jena in June 2009.

== Personal life ==
He was known as "Sille" at Hannover 96. He is married and has two children.
