= Marek Jungr =

Czech footballer

Personal information
- Date of birth: 11 April 1987 (age 39)
- Place of birth: Strakonice, Czechoslovakia
- Height: 1.77 m (5 ft 10 in)
- Position: Midfielder

Senior career*
Years	Team	Apps	(Gls)
2006–2009	Sparta Prague	1	(0)
2007	→ FK Příbram (loan)	12	(0)
2007	→ České Budějovice (loan)	6	(0)
2009–2010	Bohemians 1905		
2009	→ 1. FK Příbram (loan)		
2010–2011	Vlašim	28	(10)
2011–2013	FK Teplice	10	(0)
2011–2013	→ Vysočina Jihlava (loan)	47	(8)
2013–2016	Vysočina Jihlava	27	(4)
2016–	ASV Schrems		

International career^{‡}
2004	Czech Republic U-17	1	(0)
2004–2005	Czech Republic U-18	8	(0)
2005–2006	Czech Republic U-19	14	(0)
2007	Czech Republic U-20	3	(0)
- * Club domestic league appearances and goals as of 1 June 2014 ‡ National team caps and goals as of 21 July 2011

Marek Jungr (born 11 April 1987) is a former Czech football player who lastly played for FC Vysočina Jihlava. He has represented his country at youth international level.

In September 2011, Jungr moved on loan to Jihlava until the end of the calendar year.
