= Jakub Dohnálek =

Czech footballer (born 1988)

Personal information
- Full name: Jakub Dohnálek
- Date of birth: 12 January 1988 (age 38)
- Place of birth: Vítkov, Czechoslovakia
- Height: 1.88 m (6 ft 2 in)
- Position: Right back

Youth career
- Opava

Senior career*
| Years | Team | Apps | (Gls) |
| 2004–2005 | Opava | 9 | (0) |
| 2005–2009 | Slovan Liberec | 24 | (1) |
| 2008 | → Zenit Čáslav (loan) | | |
| 2009–2010 | Hlučín | | |
| 2010–2011 | Spartak Trnava | 4 | (0) |

International career^{‡}
| 2003–2004 | Czech Republic U-16 | 11 | (1) |
| 2004–2005 | Czech Republic U-17 | 18 | (4) |
| 2005 | Czech Republic U-18 | 5 | (0) |
| 2005–2007 | Czech Republic U-19 | 22 | (1) |
| 2007 | Czech Republic U-20 | 4 | (0) |
- * Club domestic league appearances and goals as of 20 December 2010 ‡ National team caps and goals as of 3 June 2011

Jakub Dohnálek (born 12 January 1988) is a Czech football defender who is currently free agent.

He has represented his country at youth level. He played in the 2007 FIFA U-20 World Cup.

== Honours ==
Czech Rupublic U-21

- FIFA U-20 World Cup runner-up (1) 2007
