= Thilo Versick =

German footballer

Personal information
- Date of birth: 27 November 1985 (age 40)
- Place of birth: Minden, West Germany
- Height: 1.78 m (5 ft 10 in)
- Position: Striker

Youth career
- 1995–1998: JSG Maaslingen/Petershagen
- 1998–2000: JSG Haddenhausen/Hille
- 2000–2001: Union Minden
- 2001–2002: SC Herford
- 2003–2004: VfL Bückeburg

Senior career*
Years	Team	Apps	(Gls)
2007–2010	Arminia Bielefeld II	39	(12)
2010–2011	Arminia Bielefeld	2	(0)
2011	SC Wiedenbrück 2000	6	(0)
Total		47	(12)
- * Club domestic league appearances and goals

Thilo Versick (born 27 November 1985 in Minden) is a German former professional footballer who played as a forward. He made two appearances for Arminia Bielefeld in the Bundesliga.

== Career ==
Versick joined the youth system of Arminia Bielefeld in the summer of 2006, playing for amateur clubs SC Herford, VfL Bückeburg and Rot-Weiß Maaslingen. In his first year, he suffered a cruciate ligament tear, which kept him out for the 2006/07 season. The striker received a professional contract with the Bielefeld Bundesliga club on 1 January 2008, after his good performances for Arminia's Oberliga amateurs earned him a contract that ran until 2011. Versick made his Bundesliga debut on 7 December 2007 in Arminia's 6-1 defeat at Dortmund.

After Versick was relegated to Arminia's second team in the summer of 2010, he moved to SC Wiedenbrück 2000 in the Regionalliga West in January 2011. For the 2011/12 season, Versick moved to SV Rödinghausen, newly promoted to the Landesliga, with whom he was promoted to the Westfalenliga in 2012 and to the Oberliga Westfalen a year later. For the 2013/14 season, Versick moved to Landesliga club SC Herford. He was promoted to the Westfalenliga with the club in 2014. He ended his playing career in 2017.
