= Krzysztof Strugarek =

Polish footballer

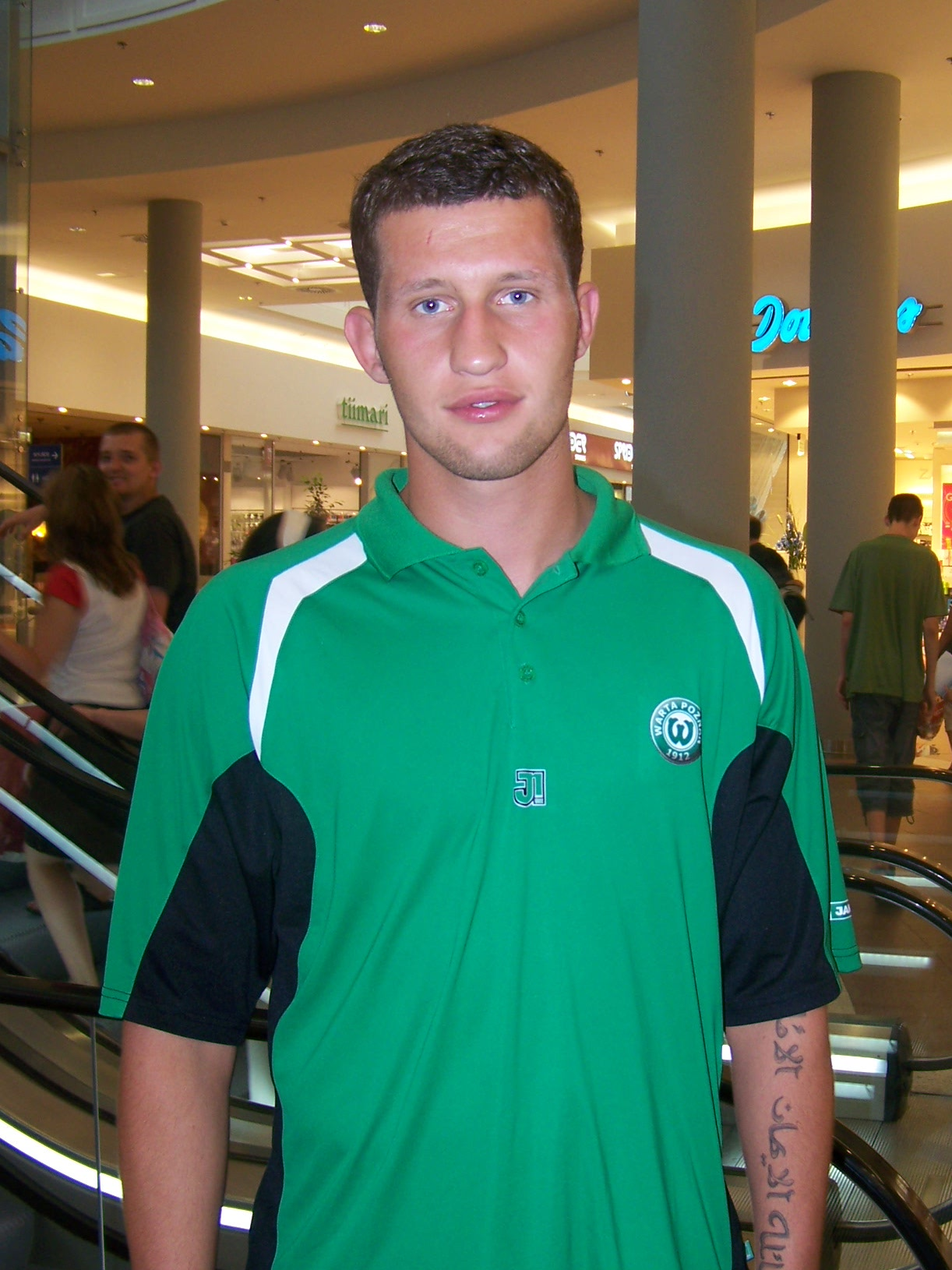

Personal information
- Full name: Krzysztof Andrzej Strugarek
- Date of birth: 19 July 1987 (age 39)
- Place of birth: Poznań, Poland
- Height: 1.93 m (6 ft 4 in)
- Position: Defender

Youth career
- Maczki Poznań
- TPS Winogrady

Senior career*
Years	Team	Apps	(Gls)
2004–2007	Lech Poznań	3	(0)
2007	→ ŁKS Łomża (loan)	13	(2)
2007–2008	Wisła Płock	4	(0)
2008–2009	Warta Poznań	29	(1)
2009	Polonia Bytom	0	(0)
2010	Warta Poznań	14	(0)
Total		63	(3)

International career
2003	Poland U16	14	(1)
2004	Poland U17	7	(1)
2005	Poland U18	6	(0)
2006	Poland U19	10	(0)
2007	Poland U20	10	(0)
- * Club domestic league appearances and goals

Krzysztof Andrzej Strugarek (born 19 July 1987) is a Polish former professional footballer who played as a defender. Strugarek competed in the 2007 FIFA U-20 World Cup in Canada.

Born with a hearing impediment, he retired in 2010 in order to undergo a hearing implant surgery; the device would make it impossible for him to head a football.
