= Mariusz Sacha =

Polish footballer

Personal information
- Full name: Mariusz Marcin Sacha
- Date of birth: 19 July 1987 (age 39)
- Place of birth: Bielsko-Biała, Poland
- Height: 1.76 m (5 ft 9 in)
- Position: Midfielder

Team information
- Current team: Czarni Jaworze
- Number: 87

Youth career
- SMS Bielsko-Biała

Senior career*
Years	Team	Apps	(Gls)
2004–2008	Podbeskidzie Bielsko-Biała	108	(9)
2008–2011	Cracovia	30	(5)
2011–2013	Podbeskidzie Bielsko-Biała	16	(2)
2013–2014	Polonia Bytom	13	(0)
2014	Stal Stalowa Wola	6	(0)
2017	MRKS Czechowice-Dziedzice	2	(0)
2018–2019	Czarni Jaworze	19	(5)
2019	GLS Wilkowice	4	(1)
2020	Czarni Jaworze	0	(0)
2020–2021	GLS Wilkowice	19	(0)
2021–2022	KS Międzyrzecze	24	(9)
2023–	Czarni Jaworze	20	(1)

International career
2006	Poland U19		
2007	Poland U20	5	(1)
- * Club domestic league appearances and goals as of 19 July 2024

Mariusz Marcin Sacha (born 19 July 1987) is a Polish footballer who plays as a midfielder for Czarni Jaworze.

== Career ==
=== Club ===
In July 2011, he moved to his previous club Podbeskidzie Bielsko-Biała on a two-year contract.

=== National team ===
He represented Poland at the 2006 UEFA U-19 Championship and the 2007 FIFA U-20 World Cup.
