= João Godinho =

Portuguese footballer

Personal information
- Full name: João Nuno Lobo Godinho
- Date of birth: 28 September 1984 (age 42)
- Place of birth: Lisbon, Portugal
- Height: 1.89 m (6 ft 2 1/2 in)
- Position: Goalkeeper

Youth career
- 1994–2003: Benfica

Senior career*
| Years | Team | Apps | (Gls) |
| 2003–2004 | Benfica B | | |
| 2004–2005 | Vilafranquense | 11 | (0) |
| 2005 | Torreense | 2 | (0) |
| 2005–2008 | Oriental | 26 | (0) |
| 2008–2009 | O Elvas | 26 | (0) |
| 2009–2010 | Odivelas | 23 | (0) |
| 2010–2012 | Carregado | 41 | (0) |
| 2012–2021 | Mafra | 201 | (0) |
| 2021–2022 | Real Massamá | 23 | (0) |
| Total | | 353 | (0) |
- * Club domestic league appearances and goals

João Nuno Lobo Godinho (born 28 September 1984) is a Portuguese former professional footballer who played as a goalkeeper.

== Club career ==
Born in Lisbon, Godinho competed in the lower leagues until the age of 31, representing S.L. Benfica B, U.D. Vilafranquense, S.C.U. Torreense, Clube Oriental de Lisboa, O Elvas CAD, Odivelas FC, A.D. Carregado and C.D. Mafra. In the 2014–15 season, he contributed nine appearances as the latter club promoted to the LigaPro for the first time ever.

Godinho made his debut as a professional on 30 September 2015, keeping a clean sheet in a 0–0 home draw against C.D. Santa Clara. The campaign would, however, end in immediate relegation after a 21st-place finish.

At the end of 2017–18, club and player managed to return to the second division after a two-year wait. In the process, Godinho did not concede a goal in 17 matches.

== Career statistics ==
As of 19 July 2018

| Club | Season | League | | | Cup | | Continental | | Other | | Total | |
| Club | Season | Division | Apps | Goals | Apps | Goals | Apps | Goals | Apps | Goals | Apps | Goals |
|---|---|---|---|---|---|---|---|---|---|---|---|---|
| Vilafranquense | 2004–05 | Segunda Divisão | 11 | 0 | 1 (Note: Appearances in Taça de Portugal) | 0 | – | | 0 | 0 | 12 | 0 |
| Torreense | 2004–05 | Segunda Divisão | 2 | 0 | 0 | 0 | – | | 0 | 0 | 2 | 0 |
| Oriental | 2005–06 | Segunda Divisão | 25 | 0 | 0 | 0 | – | | 0 | 0 | 25 | 0 |
| Oriental | 2006–07 | Terceira Divisão | 1 | 0 | 1 | 0 | – | | 0 | 0 | 2 | 0 |
| Oriental | 2007–08 | Terceira Divisão | 0 | 0 | 1 | 0 | – | | 0 | 0 | 1 | 0 |
| Oriental | Total | | 26 | 0 | 2 | 0 | 0 | 0 | 0 | 0 | 28 | 0 |
| O Elvas | 2008–09 | Terceira Divisão | 26 | 0 | 2 | 0 | – | | 0 | 0 | 28 | 0 |
| Odivelas | 2009–10 | Segunda Divisão | 23 | 0 | 0 | 0 | – | | 0 | 0 | 23 | 0 |
| Carregado | 2010–11 | Segunda Divisão | 12 | 0 | 1 | 0 | – | | 0 | 0 | 13 | 0 |
| Carregado | 2011–12 | Segunda Divisão | 29 | 0 | 1 | 0 | – | | 0 | 0 | 30 | 0 |
| Carregado | Total | | 41 | 0 | 2 | 0 | 0 | 0 | 0 | 0 | 43 | 0 |
| Mafra | 2012–13 | Segunda Divisão | 29 | 0 | 1 | 0 | – | | 0 | 0 | 30 | 0 |
| Mafra | 2013–14 | Campeonato de Portugal | 29 | 0 | 0 | 0 | – | | 0 | 0 | 29 | 0 |
| Mafra | 2014–15 | Campeonato de Portugal | 9 | 0 | 0 | 0 | – | | 0 | 0 | 9 | 0 |
| Mafra | 2015–16 | LigaPro | 8 | 0 | 1 | 0 | – | | 0 | 0 | 9 | 0 |
| Mafra | 2016–17 | Campeonato de Portugal | 19 | 0 | 0 | 0 | – | | 0 | 0 | 19 | 0 |
| Mafra | 2017–18 | Campeonato de Portugal | 34 | 0 | 1 | 0 | – | | 0 | 0 | 35 | 0 |
| Mafra | 2018–19 | LigaPro | 0 | 0 | 0 | 0 | – | | 0 | 0 | 0 | 0 |
| Mafra | Total | | 128 | 0 | 3 | 0 | 0 | 0 | 0 | 0 | 131 | 0 |
| Career total | | | 257 | 0 | 10 | 0 | 0 | 0 | 0 | 0 | 267 | 0 |
