= Paweł Król (footballer, born 1987) =

Polish footballer

Personal information
- Full name: Paweł Król
- Date of birth: 10 December 1987 (age 38)
- Place of birth: Bartoszyce, Poland
- Height: 1.91 m (6 ft 3 in)
- Position: Defender

Senior career*
| Years | Team | Apps | (Gls) |
| 2004–2006 | Górnik Zabrze | 7 | (0) |
| 2005 | → GKS Katowice (loan) | 6 | (0) |
| 2006–2009 | Korona Kielce | 2 | (0) |
| 2009 | → Odra Opole (loan) | 10 | (0) |
| 2010–2012 | Bałtyk Gdynia | 70 | (7) |
| 2012–2014 | GKS Tychy | 0 | (0) |
| 2014 | Calisia Kalisz | 9 | (0) |
| Total | | 104 | (7) |
- * Club domestic league appearances and goals

Paweł Król (born 10 December 1987) is a Polish former professional footballer who played as a defender. He started his career with Górnik Zabrze. In the winter of 2006, he underwent trials at Manchester City.
