= Greifswalder FC =

- Full name: Greifswalder FC e. V.
- Founded: 1 July 2015
- Ground: Volksstadion Greifswald
- Capacity: 4,990
- Chairman: Heiko Jaap
- Manager: Alain Karim
- League: Regionalliga Nordost (IV)
- 2025–26: Regionalliga Nordost, 15th of 18
- Website: https://greifswalder-fc.de/
Home colours	Away colours

Greifswalder FC is a German association football club from Greifswald, Mecklenburg-Vorpommern.

== History ==
The club can be traced back to Greifswalder SC, which was founded in 1926, forcibly dissolved in 1945 and re-founded in 1990. Greifswalder SC had to file for insolvency in 2002 and was dissolved in 2003 after the insolvency proceedings were concluded; subsequently, Greifswalder SV was founded in 2004. Greifswalder FC was formed on 1 July 2015 through the merger of Greifswalder SV with Pommern Greifswald, after talks had already been held about a merger of the two clubs before the 2014–15 season. Pommern Greifswald's team was withdrawn from the NOFV-Oberliga Nord and the entire club was dissolved. The members joined Greifswalder SV, which was renamed Greifswalder FC.

Despite being eligible to play in the Oberliga, the club decided to take over the place of Greifswalder SV in the Verbandsliga Mecklenburg-Vorpommern. After two runner-up finishes in a row, Greifswalder FC was promoted to the NOFV-Oberliga Nord in the 2017–18 season. In the 2018–19 season, Greifswalder FC finished third behind Berlin-based clubs SV Lichtenberg and Tennis Borussia Berlin.

Since the 2020–21 season of the Mecklenburg-Vorpommern Cup was abandoned, the Mecklenburg-Vorpommern State Football Association decided that the best-placed team in Mecklenburg-Vorpommern's league system would take part in the 2021–22 DFB-Pokal. Since Hansa Rostock had already qualified for the DFB-Pokal via the 2020–21 3. Liga, Greifswalder FC was awarded the spot. In the first round, the team was eliminated by Bundesliga team FC Augsburg after a 4–2 home loss.

== Recent seasons ==
Historical chart of the club's league performance

Season	Division	Tier	Position
2015–16	Verbandsliga Mecklenburg-Vorpommern	VI	2nd
2016–17	Versbandsliga Mecklenburg-Vorpommern	VI	2nd
2017–18	Verbandsliga Mecklenburg-Vorpommern	VI	1st ↑
2018–19	NOFV-Oberliga Nord	V	3rd
2019–20	NOFV-Oberliga Nord	V	2nd^{1}
2020–21	NOFV-Oberliga Nord	V	3rd^{1}
2021–22	NOFV-Oberliga Nord	V	1st ↑
2022–23	Regionalliga Nordost	IV	14th
2023–24	Regionalliga Nordost	IV	2nd
2024–25	Regionalliga Nordost	IV	16th
2025–26	Regionalliga Nordost	IV	15th

^{1} The 2019–20 and 2020–21 seasons were abandoned due to the COVID-19 pandemic in Germany. Greifswalder FC was ranked based on 2.33 (2019–20) and 1.89 (2020–21) points per game.

== Honours ==
- Verbandsliga Mecklenburg-Vorpommern
  - Winners: 2017–18
- NOFV-Oberliga Nord
  - Winners: 2021–22
- Mecklenburg-Vorpommern Cup
  - Winners: 2024

== Stadium ==
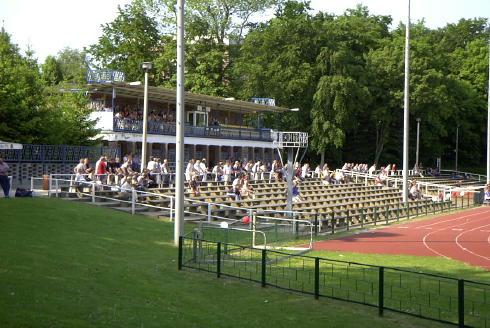
Volksstadion Greifswald (2005)

Greifswalder FC plays its home matches at Volksstadion Greifswald with a capacity of 8,000 seats.

== Current squad ==
As of 8 September 2026

Note: Flags indicate national team as defined under FIFA eligibility rules; some limited exceptions apply. Players may hold more than one non-FIFA nationality.

No.	Pos.	Nation	Player
1	GK	CZE	Jakub Jakubov
5	DF	GER	Joel Awuah
6	DF	AUT	Lukas Walchhütter
7	FW	GER	Theo Harz
8	MF	GER	Mc Moordy King Hüther
9	FW	GER	Grace Bokake
10	FW	GER	Gibson Adu
11	DF	GER	Lion Semić (on loan from VfL Osnabrück)
13	MF	GER	Robert Leipertz
14	FW	GER	Colin Kroll-Thiel
16	MF	GER	Janis Juckel
17	FW	GER	Kay Seidemann
18	DF	GER	Marcus Niemitz

No.	Pos.	Nation	Player
19	MF	GER	Michael Sternberg
20	MF	AUT	Bajram Syla
21	FW	GER	Felix Schubart
22	MF	GER	Musa Alkan
23	MF	GER	Laurin Schößler
26	GK	GER	Lennox Bohnenstädt
27	GK	GER	Luis Ackermann
29	DF	GER	Elias Ndukwe Oke
31	FW	POR	Fodelcio
33	MF	GER	Leon Schmökel
34	FW	GER	Felix Heim
35	DF	GER	Alexander Seidel

== Managers ==
- Hagen Reeck (1 July 2015 – 30 June 2017)
- Roland Kroos (1 July 2017 – April 2021)
- Martin Schröder (April 2021 – October 2021)
- Roland Kroos (October 2021 – February 2023)
- Roland Vrabec (February 2023 – April 2023)
- Lars Fuchs (April 2023 – October 2024)
- Markus Zschiesche (October 2024 – present)

== Notable former players ==
- Christian Person (2015–2018)
- Sven Hartwig (2016–2018)
- Sascha Schünemann (2020–2021)
