= 2007 African Youth Championship squads =

2007 African Youth Championship squads lists the composition of all squads which competed in the 2007 African Youth Championship association football event held in the Republic of the Congo.

== Group A ==
=== Congo ===
No.	Pos.	Player	Date of birth (age)	Caps	Club
1	GK	Destin Onka Malonga	18 March 1988 (aged 18)		(Republic of the Congo) ACNFF
2		Yann Haries Kombo Melo	12 March 1989 (aged 17)		(Republic of the Congo) ACNFF
3		Yan Ahoungou	5 September 1988 (aged 18)		(Republic of the Congo) ACNFF
4		Jules Ondjola	25 August 1988 (aged 18)		(Republic of the Congo) ACNFF
5		Gracia Ikouma	24 December 1989 (aged 17)		(Republic of the Congo) Club 57
6		Oxence M'Bani	5 May 1987 (aged 19)		(Republic of the Congo) ACNFF
7		Hermann Lakolo	13 April 1989 (aged 17)		(Republic of the Congo) ACNFF
8	MF	Delvin N'Dinga	14 March 1988 (aged 18)		(France) Auxerre
9		Chirel Ngakosso	30 October 1990 (aged 16)		(Republic of the Congo) ACNFF
10	DF	Cecil Filanckembo	15 April 1988 (aged 18)		(Republic of the Congo) ACNFF
11	FW	Franchel Ibara	27 July 1989 (aged 17)		(Republic of the Congo) Étoile du Congo
12	FW	Fabrice N'Guessi	27 February 1988 (aged 18)		(Republic of the Congo) La Mancha
13	MF	Harris Tchilimbou	11 November 1988 (aged 18)		(Republic of the Congo) ACNFF
14		Jacques Elembela	11 July 1988 (aged 18)		(Republic of the Congo) Olyampic
15	DF	Mimille Okiélé	17 April 1988 (aged 18)		(Republic of the Congo) CARA Brazzaville
16		Rufin Diampamba	10 October 1988 (aged 18)		(Republic of the Congo) Club 57
17	DF	Kaster Mereck	1 September 1988 (aged 18)		(Republic of the Congo) ACNFF
18		Saide Nkounga Kimbongu	20 September 1990 (aged 16)		(Republic of the Congo) ACNFF

=== Ivory Coast ===
No.	Pos.	Player	Date of birth (age)	Caps	Club
1		Jean Y. Andre Andy	12 August 1988 (aged 18)		(Ivory Coast) Cf Seny F.
2		Hamed Diomandé	17 June 1988 (aged 18)		(Ivory Coast) ASEC Mimosas
3		Patrick Kouakou	20 March 1988 (aged 18)		(Ivory Coast) ASEC Mimosas
4		Romaric Kablan	12 April 1988 (aged 18)		(Ivory Coast) Stella Club d'Adjamé
5		Ange Negus Gnaleko	30 December 1987 (aged 19)		(France) Guingamp
6		Assane Karaboualy	13 March 1987 (aged 19)		(France) Toulouse
7	FW	Abdul Moustapha Ouedraogo	9 June 1988 (aged 18)		(Ivory Coast) ASEC Mimosas
8	FW	Koffi Mechac	24 September 1989 (aged 17)		(Ivory Coast) AS Denguélé
9		Kouassi Koffi	17 November 1989 (aged 17)		(Ivory Coast) Domoraud
10	FW	Koro Issa Ahmed Koné	5 July 1988 (aged 18)		(Switzerland) Grasshopper Zürich
11	MF	Martial Yao	4 October 1989 (aged 17)		(Ivory Coast) ASEC Mimosas
12	MF	Konan Serge Kouadio	31 December 1988 (aged 18)		(Ivory Coast) ASEC Mimosas
13	DF	Zié Diabaté	2 March 1989 (aged 17)		(Ivory Coast) IFER
14		Karamoko Toure	22 November 1987 (aged 19)		(Tunisia) Étoile du Sahel
15	MF	Aboubacar Mé Diomandé	7 May 1988 (aged 18)		(Ivory Coast) ASEC Mimosas
16	GK	Ibrahim Koné	5 December 1989 (aged 17)		(Ivory Coast) CF Excellence
17	MF	Xavier Kouassi	28 December 1989 (aged 17)		(Ivory Coast) Domoraud
18	DF	Adama Traoré	3 February 1990 (aged 16)		(Ivory Coast) EF Yéo Martial

=== Burkina Faso ===
No.	Pos.	Player	Date of birth (age)	Caps	Club
1	GK	Amadou Séré	30 December 1987 (aged 19)		(Burkina Faso) Rail Club du Kadiogo
2	MF	Soungalo Ouattara	31 December 1987 (aged 19)		(Burkina Faso) Étoile Filante
3		Cheik Omar Sanogo	10 October 1987 (aged 19)		(Burkina Faso) ASFA Yennenga
4		Matrin Kafando D	24 April 1988 (aged 18)		(Burkina Faso) US Forces Armées
5		Jean Noel Lingani	12 December 1988 (aged 18)		(Burkina Faso) Étoile Filante
6	DF	Bakary Koné	27 April 1988 (aged 18)		(Burkina Faso) Étoile Filante
7	FW	Issiaka Ouédraogo	19 August 1988 (aged 18)		(Burkina Faso) US Forces Armées
8	FW	Youssouf Sanou	31 December 1988 (aged 18)		(Burkina Faso) RC Bobo Dioulasso
9	FW	Boubacar Kébé	10 May 1987 (aged 19)		(France) Libourne-St-Seurin
10	MF	Salif Dianda	17 December 1987 (aged 19)		(Italy) Hellas Verona
11	FW	Amara Konaté	3 September 1990 (aged 16)		(France) Marseille
12	MF	Charles Kaboré	9 February 1988 (aged 18)		(France) Libourne-St-Seurin
13	MF	Drissa Dabré	24 April 1989 (aged 17)		(Italy) Atalanta
14	FW	Alain Traoré	31 December 1988 (aged 18)		(France) Auxerre
15	MF	Adama Guira	24 April 1988 (aged 18)		(Burkina Faso) RC Bobo Dioulasso
16		Boubacar Ouedraogo	5 August 1988 (aged 18)		(Burkina Faso) US Ouagadougou
17		Adama Sabo	13 March 1988 (aged 18)		(Burkina Faso) ASFA Yennenga
18	DF	Yobie Bassoule	24 December 1988 (aged 18)		(Italy) Juventus

=== Gambia ===
No.	Pos.	Player	Date of birth (age)	Caps	Club
1		Joseph Gómez	25 December 1987 (aged 19)		(The Gambia) Wallidan Fc
2		Pierre Gomez	3 May 1989 (aged 17)		(The Gambia) Hawks Fc
3		Furmus Mendy	11 July 1987 (aged 19)		(The Gambia) Gpa
4		Alagie Amadou Ngum	18 October 1988 (aged 18)		(The Gambia) Gamtel
5		Ken Jammeh	18 November 1987 (aged 19)		(The Gambia) Hawks Fc
6		Mandou Bojang	18 November 1988 (aged 18)		(The Gambia) Gpa
7		Demba Sanyang	27 November 1987 (aged 19)		(The Gambia) Steve Biko Fc
8		Habib Kunta	8 March 1988 (aged 18)		(The Gambia) Steve Biko
9		Pa Modou Jagne	26 December 1989 (aged 17)		(The Gambia) Gpa
10		Pa Landing Conateh	10 October 1987 (aged 19)		(The Gambia) Real
11		Ebrima Sohna	14 December 1988 (aged 18)		(The Gambia) Wallidan Fc
12		Kenny Mansally	27 January 1989 (aged 17)		(The Gambia) Real Fc
13		Ousman Jallow	21 October 1988 (aged 18)		(The Gambia) Raja Casablanca
14		Sainey Nyassi	31 January 1989 (aged 17)		(The Gambia) Gpa
15		Tijan Jaiteh	31 December 1988 (aged 18)		(The Gambia) Brann Fc
16		Christopher Allen	19 December 1989 (aged 17)		(The Gambia) Gamtel Fc
17		Sanna Nyassi	31 January 1989 (aged 17)		(The Gambia) Gpa
18		Saja Leigh	24 November 1988 (aged 18)		(The Gambia) Satde De Mali

== Group B ==
=== Nigeria ===
No.	Pos.	Player	Date of birth (age)	Caps	Club
1	GK	Thomas Olufemi	5 August 1989 (aged 17)		(Nigeria) Nasarawa United
2	DF	Sodiq Suraj	8 January 1988 (aged 19)		(Nigeria) Sunshine Stars F.C.
3	DF	Elderson Echiéjilé	20 January 1988 (aged 19)		(Nigeria) Bendel Insurance
4	FW	Muideen Oyewole	3 December 1987 (aged 19)		(Nigeria) Prime F.C.
5	FW	Ezekiel Bala	8 April 1987 (aged 19)		(Norway) Lyn Fotball
6	DF	Nnaemeka Anyanwu	21 May 1988 (aged 18)		(Nigeria) Enugu Rangers
7	MF	Emmanuel Sarki	26 December 1987 (aged 19)		(Belgium) Westerlo
8	MF	Friday Iyam	1 December 1989 (aged 17)		(Nigeria) Kaduna United
9	MF	Nduka Ozokwo	25 December 1988 (aged 18)		(Nigeria) Enugu Rangers
10	MF	Solomon Owello	25 December 1988 (aged 18)		(Nigeria) Niger Tornadoes
11	FW	Mohammed Salihu Danjuma	2 August 1989 (aged 17)		(Spain) Barcelona
12	GK	Moses Ocheje	21 May 1988 (aged 18)		(Nigeria) Lobi Stars
13	MF	Blessing Okardi	5 November 1988 (aged 18)		(Nigeria) Ocean Boys
14	FW	Joseph Bala	27 July 1988 (aged 18)		(Nigeria) Sec Fc
15	DF	Tijani Akanbi	21 December 1988 (aged 18)		(Nigeria) Wikki Tourists
16	DF	Frederick Odebe	31 December 1988 (aged 18)		(Nigeria) Lobi Stars
17	FW	Simon Zenke	24 December 1988 (aged 18)		(France) Strasbourg
18	DF	Ayodeji Brown	12 September 1988 (aged 18)		(Nigeria) Enugu Rangers

=== Egypt ===
No.	Pos.	Player	Date of birth (age)	Caps	Club
1	GK	Ahmed Adel Abd El-Moneam	10 April 1987 (aged 19)		(Egypt) Al-Ahly
2	DF	Mohamed Samir	5 November 1987 (aged 19)		(Egypt) Al-Ahly
3		Ayman Mohamady Ibrahim	28 January 1987 (aged 19)		(Egypt) Zamalek
4		Ibrahim Yehia	17 October 1987 (aged 19)		(Egypt) Ismaily
5	MF	Mostafa Shebeita	10 May 1987 (aged 19)		(Egypt) Al-Ahly
6	DF	Ramy Sabry	5 January 1987 (aged 20)		(Egypt) ENNPI
7		Mostafa Talaat Elzamzamy	1 January 1987 (aged 20)		(Egypt) Al-Ahly
8		Shawky El Said	1 January 1987 (aged 20)		(Egypt) El Shams
9	DF	Ahmed Elmohamady	9 September 1987 (aged 19)		(Egypt) ENPPI
10	FW	Sherif Ashraf	1 January 1987 (aged 20)		(Egypt) Al-Ahly
11	FW	Ahmed Hassan Mekky	20 April 1987 (aged 19)		(Egypt) Haras El hodood
12		Omar Mohamed Rabie	18 August 1988 (aged 18)		(Egypt) Al-Ahly
13		Mohamed Reda Abd El Baky Mahmoud	18 January 1987 (aged 20)		(Egypt) Al-Ahly
14		Ahmed Gomaa	1 January 1987 (aged 20)		(Egypt) ENPPI
15		Sameh Abd Elfadil	22 March 1987 (aged 19)		(Egypt) ENPPI
16	GK	Mohamed El Shenawy	18 December 1988 (aged 18)		(Egypt) Al-Ahly
17		Ahmed Abd Elrahman Kamel	7 July 1987 (aged 19)		(Egypt) Al-Ahly
18		Salah Ahmed Mohamed Ahmed	8 September 1987 (aged 19)		(Egypt) ENPPI

=== Cameroon ===
No.	Pos.	Player	Date of birth (age)	Caps	Club
1	GK	Jules Goda	30 May 1989 (aged 17)		(France) Bastia
2		Jackson Eyinga Nna	4 February 1987 (aged 19)		(Cameroon) Coton S
3	DF	Nicolas N'Koulou	27 March 1990 (aged 16)		(Cameroon) Kadji Sports
4		Hermann Yanka Nana	26 September 1987 (aged 19)		(Cameroon) Dynamo
5	FW	Mbilla Etame	22 June 1988 (aged 18)		(Cameroon) Union Douala
6	DF	Bondoa Adiaba	2 January 1987 (aged 20)		(Cameroon) Dreams de Douala
7	MF	Alexandre Morfaw	31 August 1987 (aged 19)		(France) Nantes
8	FW	Léonard Kweuke	12 July 1987 (aged 19)		(Cameroon) Cintra Yaoundé
9	FW	Benjamin Moukandjo	12 November 1988 (aged 18)		(Cameroon) Kadji Sports
10		Max Lamber Pehn	10 October 1988 (aged 18)		(Cameroon) Ceteedla
11	FW	Jude Kongnyuy	2 July 1988 (aged 18)		(Cameroon) Young Sports
12	DF	Charley Fomen	9 July 1989 (aged 17)		Mount Cameroon
13	FW	Yves Djidda	14 July 1988 (aged 18)		(Cameroon) Astres FC
14	MF	Georges Mandjeck	9 December 1988 (aged 18)		(Cameroon) Kadji Sports
15		Armand Ndjama	16 April 1988 (aged 18)		(Cameroon) Fc Soch
16	GK	Francois Beyokol	12 March 1989 (aged 17)		(Cameroon) Cintra Yaoundé
17	FW	David Eto'o	13 June 1987 (aged 19)		(France) Créteil
18	MF	Alex Song	9 September 1987 (aged 19)		(England) Arsenal

=== Zambia ===
No.	Pos.	Player	Date of birth (age)	Caps	Club
1		Jacob Banda	11 February 1988 (aged 18)		(Zambia) Zesco United
2		Peter Malama	11 April 1988 (aged 18)		(Zambia) Nchanga
3		Joseph Zimba	1 August 1988 (aged 18)		(Zambia) National Assembly
4		Dennis Banda	10 December 1988 (aged 18)		(Zambia) Green Buffaloes
5		Henry Nyambe Mulenga	27 August 1987 (aged 19)		(Zambia) Forest Rangers
6		Hijani Himoonde	1 August 1987 (aged 19)		(Zambia) Lusaka Dynamos
7		Richard Phiri	28 October 1987 (aged 19)		(Zambia) Chambishi
8		William Njobvu	4 March 1987 (aged 19)		(Zambia) Lusaka Dynamos
9		Simon Lupiya	2 February 1988 (aged 18)		(Zambia) Red Arrows
10		Clifford Mulenga	5 August 1987 (aged 19)		(Zambia) Tuks Academy
11		Fwayo Tembo	2 May 1989 (aged 17)		(Zambia) National Assembly
12		Sebastian Mwansa	21 September 1988 (aged 18)		(Zambia) Green Buffaloes
13		Musatwe Simutowe	6 March 1987 (aged 19)		(Zambia) Zamtel
14		Goodson Kachinga	4 April 1988 (aged 18)		(Zambia) Chambishi
15		Yoram Mwila	9 October 1990 (aged 16)		(Zambia) Chiparamba A.
16		Danny Munyao	11 December 1987 (aged 19)		(Zambia) Lusaka Dynamos
17		Reuben Tembo	28 December 1988 (aged 18)		(Zambia) Kabwe Warriors
18		Agripa Mbewe	30 January 1987 (aged 19)		(Zambia) Nakambala
