= Emmanuel Mayuka =

Zambian footballer (born 1990)

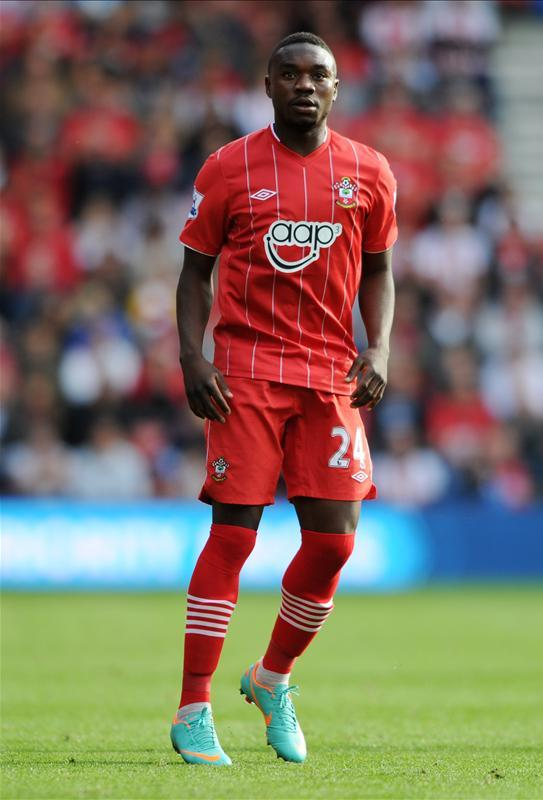
- Mayuka playing for Southampton in 2013

Personal information
- Full name: Emmanuel Mayuka
- Date of birth: 21 November 1990 (age 35)
- Place of birth: Kabwe, Zambia
- Height: 1.78 m (5 ft 10 in)
- Position: Striker

Senior career*
Years	Team	Apps	(Gls)
2006–2008	Kabwe Warriors	26	(7)
2008–2010	Maccabi Tel Aviv	41	(8)
2010–2012	Young Boys	62	(20)
2012–2015	Southampton	16	(0)
2013–2014	→ Sochaux (loan)	21	(4)
2015–2016	Metz	10	(2)
2016–2017	Zamalek	22	(5)
2017–2018	Hapoel Ra'anana	5	(0)
2019	Green Buffaloes		
2020–2022	NAPSA Stars	43	(29)
Total		244	(75)

International career
2007–2015	Zambia	61	(12)
Medal record
Men's football
Representing Zambia
Africa Cup of Nations
Winner	2012 Equatorial Guinea-Gabon
- * Club domestic league appearances and goals

Emmanuel Mayuka (born 21 November 1990) is a Zambian former professional footballer who played as a striker. He represented Zambia and was the top scorer of the 2012 Africa Cup of Nations.

== Club career ==
Born in Kabwe, Central Province, Zambia, Mayuka began his career at the Lusaka Academy at the age of 11. In 2007, he joined Kabwe Warriors, one of the biggest clubs in Zambia owned by the national railway company Zambia Railways. In this team, he flourished scoring 15 goals in 23 games. He consequently was selected to the Zambia under-17 national team.

=== Maccabi Tel Aviv ===
In September, he joined Maccabi Tel Aviv in Israel. Before opting to join Maccabi Tel Aviv, Mayuka was close to signing for Portuguese side Porto, but the move never materialised. When he moved to Maccabi Tel Aviv, Mayuka joined the youth team where he scored three goals. In April 2010, Mayuka renewed his contract at Maccabi Tel Aviv until 2014.

=== Young Boys ===
On 28 May 2010, it was confirmed that Mayuka had signed a five-year contract with Swiss club BSC Young Boys for a transfer fee of £1.7m as a replacement for Seydou Doumbia, who was sold to CSKA Moscow. On 1 December 2010, Mayuka scored two goals in the Europa League against Stuttgart in a 4–2 win. On 17 February 2011, Mayuka scored a last-minute goal against Russian club FC Zenit Saint Petersburg in UEFA Europa League match to help his team to a 2–1 home win.

=== Southampton ===
On 28 August 2012, he joined Premier League side Southampton on a five-year deal for an undisclosed fee, reported to be £3 million. He made his debut for Southampton against Manchester United at St. Mary's Stadium on 2 September 2012, coming on as a substitute.

He appeared again as a substitute in a 4–1 victory over Aston Villa, winning a penalty for the fourth goal. On 22 December 2012, he made his first start in a 1–0 loss at home to Sunderland before being substituted after 55 minutes.

His only competitive goal for the club came in a 5–1 victory over Barnsley in the League Cup on 27 August 2013.

On 2 September 2013, Mayuka joined Ligue 1 side Sochaux on a season-long loan deal.

On 30 July 2015, manager Ronald Koeman confirmed that Mayuka 'had no future at Southampton', and he was removed from the first-team, having failed to score in any of his 16 league appearances for Southampton.

=== Metz ===
On 31 August 2015, Mayuka joined French club FC Metz of Ligue 2, signing a three-year deal.

=== Zamalek ===
On 15 January 2016, Mayuka joined Egyptian club Zamalek on a three-and-a-half-year deal.

=== Hapoel Ra'anana ===
On 9 November 2017, Mayuka returned to Israel and joined Hapoel Ra'anana.

=== Green Buffaloes ===
In April 2019, Mayuka took back to Zambia and joined Green Buffaloes.

=== NAPSA Stars ===
In February 2020, Mayuka joined NAPSA Stars.

== International career ==
Mayuka was part of the class of 2007 under-20s which included Fwayo Tembo, Clifford Mulenga, Sebastian Mwansa, William Njovu, Stoppila Sunzu, Joseph Zimba, Rogers Kola, Jacob Banda, Nyambe Mulenga and Dennis Banda. He was the youngest player at the 2007 FIFA U-20 World Cup and the only school boy in the team. Despite not scoring there, many soccer pundits and fans acknowledged his contribution to one of the finest youth squads in Zambian football history.

Mayuka was not part of the U-20s that participated earlier that year at the African Youth Cup in Congo (where Zambia finished fourth) but, in the first game against Jordan, he was picked in the starting line-up, and remained such for the other two group stage matches and the round-of-16 clash with Nigeria.

Mayuka debuted for the senior side in the 2007 COSAFA Cup, scoring the second goal in a 3–0 defeat of Mozambique. Mayuka scored the first goal for Zambia of 2012 Africa Cup of Nations which was score again by his teammate Rainford Kalaba second goal in the game with Zambia earning a victory against Senegal. In the same tournament, he scored against Libya in the group stage, and then he scored the winner in a famous 1–0 victory over Ghana in the semifinals, therefore leading Zambia into the finals. He then played all 120 minutes against Ivory Coast in Zambia's penalty shootout victory against Ivory Coast.

== Career statistics ==
Scores and results list Zambia's goal tally first, score column indicates score after each Mayuka goal.

List of international goals scored by Emmanuel Mayuka
No.	Date	Venue	Opponent	Score	Result	Competition
1	29 September 2007	Super Stadium, Atteridgeville, South Africa	Mozambique	2–0	3–0	2007 COSAFA Cup
2	22 May 2008	June 11 Stadium, Tripoli, Libya	Libya	1–0	2–2	Friendly
3	3 August 2008	Thulamahashe Stadium, Bushbuckridge, South Africa	Madagascar	1–0	2–0	2008 COSAFA Cup
4	5 September 2010	Nkoloma Stadium, Lusaka, Zambia	Comoros	4–0	4–0	2012 Africa Cup of Nations qualification
5	27 March 2011	Estádio da Machava, Maputo, Mozambique	Mozambique	2–0	2–0	2012 Africa Cup of Nations qualification
6	4 September 2011	Stade Said Mohamed Cheikh, Mitsamiouli, Comoros	Comoros	2–1	2–1	2012 Africa Cup of Nations qualification
7	21 January 2012	Estadio de Bata, Bata, Equatorial Guinea	Senegal	1–0	2–1	2012 Africa Cup of Nations
8	25 January 2012	Estadio de Bata, Bata, Equatorial Guinea	Libya	1–1	2–2	2012 Africa Cup of Nations
9	8 February 2012	Estadio de Bata, Bata, Equatorial Guinea	Ghana	1–0	1–0	2012 Africa Cup of Nations
10	15 August 2012	Anyang Stadium, Anyang, South Korea	South Korea	1–1	1–2	Friendly
11	15 October 2014	Levy Mwanawasa Stadium, Ndola, Zambia	Niger	2–0	3–0	2015 Africa Cup of Nations qualification
12	22 January 2015	Estadio de Ebibeyin, Ebibeyin, Equatorial Guinea	Tunisia	1–0	1–2	2015 Africa Cup of Nations

== Honours ==
Maccabi Tel Aviv

- Toto Cup: 2008–09

Zamalek

- Egypt Cup: 2016

Zambia

- Africa Cup of Nations: 2012

Individual

- Africa Cup of Nations Golden Boot: 2012
