= Pazos =

Pazos is a surname originated in Galicia. Notable people with the surname include:

- Anthony Pazos, American television personality, celebrity stylist, and entrepreneur
- Felipe Pazos (1912–2001), Cuban economist
- James Pazos (born 1991), American baseball player
- Luis Pazos (born 1947), Mexican economist
- Manuel Pazos (1930–2019), Spanish footballer
- Marcelo Pazos (born 1953), Argentine field hockey player
- Marta Pazos (born 1976), Spanish theater director
- Rubén Pazos (born 1979), Spanish footballer
