= Umesaki =

Umesaki is a surname. Notable people with the surname include:

- Haruka Umesaki (born 2001), Japanese wrestler
- Tsukasa Umesaki (born 1987), Japanese professional footballer
