= Mbewe =

Mbewe is a surname of Zambian origin. Notable people with the surname include:

- Agripa Mbewe (born 1987), retired Zambian football striker
- Ernest Mbewe (born 1994), Zambian footballer
- Festus Mbewe (born 1988), Zambian footballer
- Mary Mbewe, Zambian journalist
- Tsakane Mbewe (born 1987), South African netball player
