= Lingani =

Lingani is a surname. Notable people with the surname include:

- Hassan Lingani (born 1987), Ivorian footballer
- Jean-Baptiste Boukary Lingani (died 1989), Burkinabé army officer
- Jean-Noël Lingani (born 1988), Burkinabé footballer
