= Kablan (surname) =

Kablan is a surname. Notable people with the surname include:

- Chris Kablan (born 1994), Swiss professional footballer
- Romaric Kablan (born 1988), Ivorian footballer
- Georges Kablan Degnan (born 1953), Ivorian sprinter
- Daniel Kablan Duncan (born 1943), Ivorian politician
