= Jammeh =

Jammeh is a surname. Notable people with the surname include:

- Abdou Jammeh (born 1986), Gambian football player
- Haruna Jammeh (born 1991), Gambian football player
- Katrin Stjernfeldt Jammeh (born 1974), Swedish politician
- Ken Jammeh (born 1987), Gambian football player
- Ousman Jammeh (born 1953), Gambian politician
- Yahya Jammeh (born 1965), president of Gambia, 1994–2017
- Zeinab Jammeh (born 1977), former First Lady of the Gambia
