= Shim Young-sung =

South Korean footballer (born 1987)

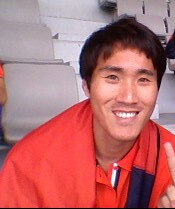

Personal information
- Date of birth: 15 January 1987 (age 39)
- Place of birth: Jeju, South Korea
- Height: 1.78 m (5 ft 10 in)
- Position: Forward

Senior career*
Years	Team	Apps	(Gls)
2004–2006	Seongnam Ilhwa Chunma	7	(0)
2006–2015	Jeju United	90	(14)
2012	→ Gangwon FC (loan)	9	(1)
2013–2014	→ FC Pocheon (loan)		
2016	Gangwon FC	30	(4)
2017	Seoul E-Land	16	(2)
2018	Busan Transportation Corporation	12	(1)
2018	Mokpo City	14	(1)

International career
2005–2007	South Korea U20	19	(15)
2007	South Korea U23	1	(0)
- * Club domestic league appearances and goals

- Shim Young-sung
- Hangul: 심영성
- Hanja: 沈永星
- RR: Sim Yeongseong
- MR: Sim Yŏngsŏng

Shim Young-sung (Korean: 심영성; born 15 January 1987) is a South Korean retired professional footballer. A forward, he was the top scorer at the AFC Youth Championship 2006. He played at the 2007 FIFA U-20 World Cup.

== Career statistics ==
Appearances and goals by club, season and competition
Club	Season	League			KFA Cup		K-League Cup		Asia		Total	
Club	Season	Division	Apps	Goals	Apps	Goals	Apps	Goals	Apps	Goals	Apps	Goals
Seongnam Ilhwa Chunma	2004	K-League	6	0	0	0	1	0			7	0
Seongnam Ilhwa Chunma	2005	K-League	0	0	0	0	2	0	—		2	0
Seongnam Ilhwa Chunma	2006	K-League	1	0	1	0	6	0	—		8	0
Jeju United	2006	K-League	8	0	0	0	0	0	—		8	0
Jeju United	2007	K-League	19	3	2	0	6	2	—		27	5
Jeju United	2008	K-League	16	3	0	0	7	4	—		23	7
Jeju United	2009	K-League	21	1	0	0	4	1	—		25	2
Jeju United	2010	K-League	0	0	0	0	0	0	—		0	0
Jeju United	2011	K-League	7	0	0	0	1	0	0	0	8	0
Career total			78	7	3	0	27	7			108	14
