= Kim Kum-il =

North Korean footballer

Personal information
- Full name: Kim Kum-il
- Date of birth: 10 October 1987 (age 39)
- Place of birth: Pyongyang, North Korea
- Height: 1.70 m (5 ft 7 in)
- Position: Striker

Senior career*
Years	Team	Apps	(Gls)
2005–2017	April 25		

International career
2005–2010	North Korea	12	(1)
- * Club domestic league appearances and goals as of 2 June 2010

- Kim Kum-il
- Hangul: 김금일
- Hanja: 金琴一
- RR: Gim Geumil
- MR: Kim Kŭmil

Kim Kum-il (Korean: 김금일; born 10 October 1987) is a North Korean former footballer who played as a striker.

== International career ==
In 2006, Kim led the North Korean Under-20 team to win the AFC Youth Championship by scoring 4 goals, he was also voted as the Most Valuable Player of the tournament. The following 2007 FIFA World Youth Championship Kim participated as Captain of the North Korean team and scored one goal at the 2–2 draw with the Czech Republic.

Kim made his debut for the national team during the 2005 East Asian Football Championship in Taipei, he also played at the 2008 East Asian Football Championship.

== Goals for senior national team ==
#	Date	Venue	Opponent	Score	Result	Competition
	24 December 2007	Bangkok, Thailand	Uzbekistan	2-2	2-2	2007 King's Cup
