= Tomáš Okleštěk =

Czech footballer

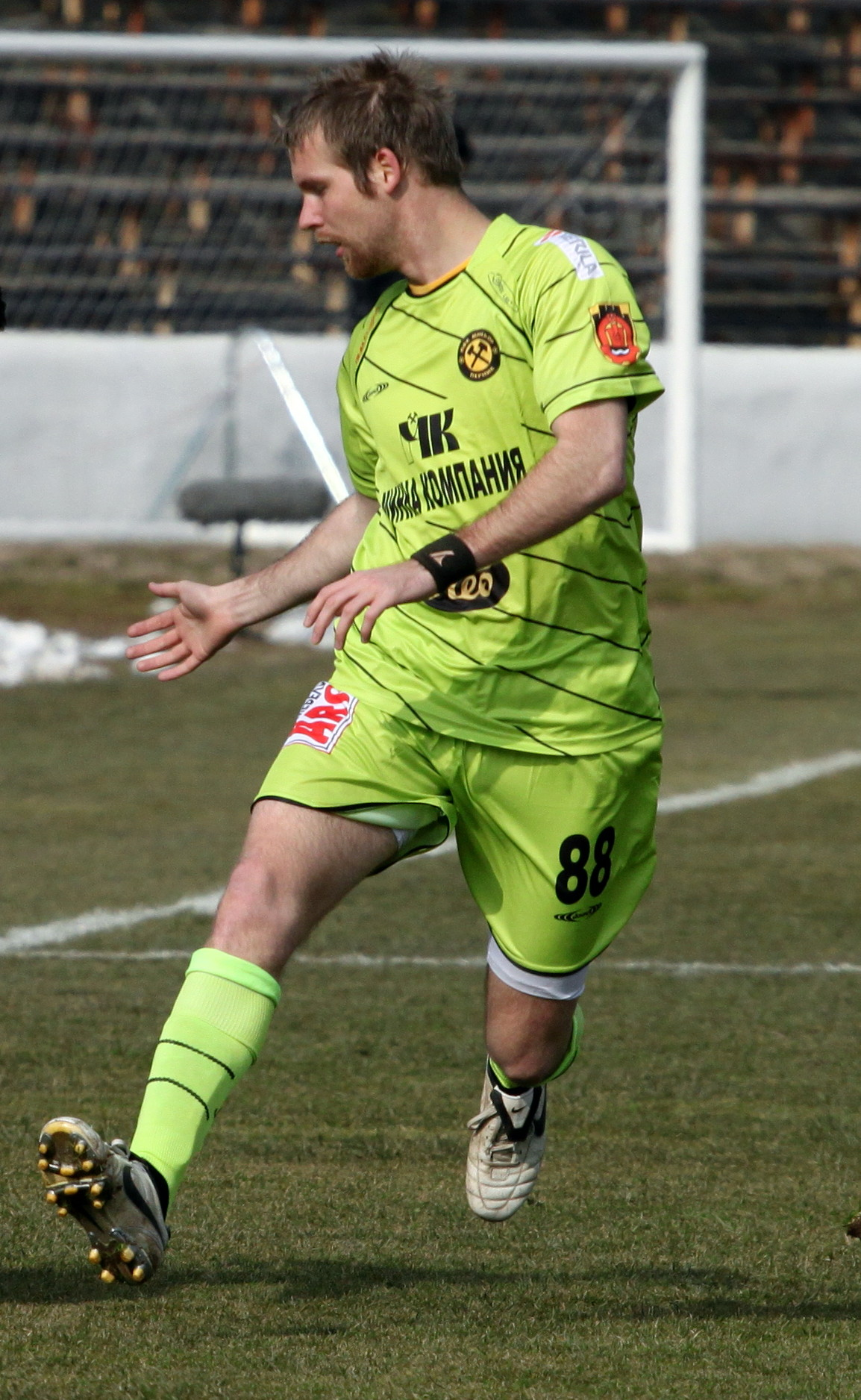

Personal information
- Full name: Tomáš Okleštěk
- Date of birth: 21 February 1987 (age 39)
- Place of birth: Brno, Czechoslovakia
- Height: 1.83 m (6 ft 0 in)
- Position: Midfielder

Team information
- Current team: Moravské Kninice

Youth career
- 1993–1998: Dosta Bystrc-Kníničky
- 1998–2006: 1. FC Brno

Senior career*
Years	Team	Apps	(Gls)
2006–2010	Zbrojovka Brno	55	(2)
2009	→ Zenit Čáslav (loan)	10	(3)
2011	Minyor Pernik	5	(0)
2011–2013	Znojmo	64	(13)
2014	Jablonec	5	(0)
2014–2016	Znojmo	53	(8)
2016–2017	Karviná	9	(0)
2017–2018	Hanácká Slavia Kroměříž	18	(4)
2018	Vítkovice	9	(1)
2018–2019	Hanácká Slavia Kroměříž	30	(8)
2019–2022	Znojmo	8	(1)
2022–2023	Start Brno		
2023–	Moravské Kninice		

International career
2004–2005	Czech Republic U-18	10	(0)
2005–2006	Czech Republic U-19	6	(0)
2006–2007	Czech Republic U-20	8	(1)
- * Club domestic league appearances and goals as of 11 April 2017 (UTC)

Tomáš Okleštěk (born 21 February 1987) is a Czech football player who currently plays for Moravské Kninice.

== Career ==
Ahead of the 2019–20 season, Okleštěk returned to 1. SC Znojmo.

== Honours ==
Czech Rupublic U-21

- FIFA U-20 World Cup runner-up (1) 2007
