= Mimille Okiélé =

Congolese footballer

Personal information
- Full name: Mimille Olfaga de Borniche Okiélé
- Date of birth: 17 April 1988 (age 38)
- Place of birth: Lengo, Republic of the Congo
- Height: 1.60 m (5 ft 3 in)
- Position: Defender

Youth career
- 2005: CARA Brazzaville

Senior career*
| Years | Team | Apps | (Gls) |
| 2006–2007 | CARA Brazzaville | 10 | (3) |
| 2007–2012 | Auxerre B | | |
| 2008–2009 | → AS Vitré (loan) | 24 | (0) |
| 2009–2012 | Auxerre | 0 | (0) |
| 2012–2013 | Le Havre II | 12 | (0) |
| 2013 | CARA Brazzaville | | |

International career
| 2005–2006 | DR Congo U17 | 3 | (0) |
| 2007–2009 | Congo U20 | 15 | (0) |
| 2009–2010 | Congo | 4 | (0) |
- * Club domestic league appearances and goals

Mimille Olfaga de Borniche Okiélé (born 17 April 1988) is a Congolese former professional footballer who played as a defender.

== Club career ==
Okielé was born in Lengo. In July 2007, he was transferred from CARA Brazzaville to AJ Auxerre B and in the 2008–09 season he was loaned out to AS Vitré.

== International career ==
Okiélé was a part of the Congo U-20 national team which won the 2007 African Youth Championship. During the competition, he was one of the most attractive players. He also participated at the 2007 FIFA U-20 World Cup in Canada.
