= Sodiq Suraj =

Nigerian footballer

Personal information
- Full name: Sodiq Suraj
- Date of birth: 8 January 1988 (age 38)
- Place of birth: Oshogbo, Nigeria
- Height: 1.80 m (5 ft 11 in)
- Positions: Midfielder; defender

Team information
- Current team: Osun United

Senior career*
Years	Team	Apps	(Gls)
2003–2005	Prime	25	(3)
2005	First Bank	18	(1)
2006–2008	Sunshine Stars	27	(2)
2008	→ Teleoptik (loan)	7	(0)
2009	Kwara United	23	(3)
2010–2012	Prime	33	(4)
2012–2013	Olympique Safi	9	(0)
2013–2014	Duhok SC	23	(0)
2014–2015	Naft Al-Wasat SC		
2015–2018	Shooting Stars	21	(1)
2018–2020	Ifeanyi Ubah		
2020–2021	Arta/Solar7		
2021–	Osun United		

International career^{‡}
2007	Nigeria U-20	14	(1)
- * Club domestic league appearances and goals as of 13 August 2013 ‡ National team caps and goals as of 13 October 2013

Sodiq Suraj (born 8 January 1988) is a Nigerian footballer who plays for Osun United.

== Club career ==
Sodiq Suraj was born in Oshogbo. He is a central defender who can also play as defensive midfielder. In 2008, he played in Serbian second level in FK Partizan's satellite team FK Teleoptik. In the season 2012–13 he played for OC Safi at Moroccan top division. In October 2013 he signed with Duhok SC in the Iraqi Premier League. Next season, in 2014, he switched to another Iraqi club, Naft Al-Wasat SC.

== International career ==
Sodiq Suraj played with Nigeria U-20 at the 2007 African Youth Championship where they were losing finalists, thus qualifying for the U-20 World Cup. Next he played with Nigeria national under-20 football team, at the 2007 FIFA U-20 World Cup in Canada where they reached the quarter-finals.

== Style of play ==
Sodiq's natural position is defender and is a variable and strong defensive player. He plays as libero or as left-back on the national team.

== Honours ==
Nigeria U-20

- Finalist at 2007 African Youth Championship
- Quarter-Finalist of 2007 FIFA U-20 World Cup
