= Murhyen Kaster Mereck Bindoumou =

Congolese footballer (born 1988)

Kaster Mereck
Personal information
- Full name: Murhyen Kaster Mereck Bindoumou
- Date of birth: 1 September 1988 (age 38)
- Place of birth: Brazzaville, Republic of the Congo
- Height: 1.65 m (5 ft 5 in)
- Position: Defender

Youth career
- 2003–2005: ACNFF

Senior career*
Years	Team	Apps	(Gls)
2006–2007	ACNFF	22	(0)
2007–2010	Auxerre	2	(0)
2009–2010	→ CD Baza (loan)	36	(0)

International career
2007–2008	Republic of Congo U20	16	(1)
- * Club domestic league appearances and goals

Murhyen Kaster Mereck Bindoumou (born 1 September 1988) is a Congolese footballer who plays as a defender.

== Club career ==
Bindoumou was born in Brazzaville, Republic of the Congo. He began his career with ACNFF. After a successful performance at the 2007 FIFA U-20 World Cup, he moved to French Ligue 1 side AJ Auxerre. In the summer of 2009, he was loaned to Spanish club CD Baza. After his return to Auxerre in summer 2010, he was released from his contract.

== International career ==
Bindoumou represented the Congo U-20 at the 2007 FIFA U-17 World Cup in Korea Republic and played four games in the tournament.
