= 2006 AFC Youth Championship =

Tournament details
- Host country: India
- Dates: 29 October – 12 November
- Teams: 16 (from 1 confederation)
- Venues: 4 (in 2 host cities)

Final positions
- Champions: North Korea (2nd title)
- Runners-up: Japan
- Third place: South Korea
- Fourth place: Jordan

Tournament statistics
- Matches played: 32
- Goals scored: 91 (2.84 per match)
- Attendance: 51,050 (1,595 per match)
- Top scorer: (South Korea) Shim Young-sung (5 goals)

The 2006 AFC Youth Championship was the 34th instance of the AFC Youth Championship. It was held from 29 October to 12 November 2006 in India. It was the first time for India to host this tournament. Sixteen teams from the AFC qualified to the finals.

The tournament was won by North Korea, their second championship after sharing the trophy with IRAN in 1976, defeating Japan 5–3 in a penalty shootout after extra time finished in a 1–1 draw. South Korea defeated Jordan 2–0 to finish third.

The tournament also served as the Asian qualifying tournament for the 2007 FIFA U-20 World Cup, with a place for the 4 semi-finalists of the tournament.

== Qualification ==
33 Teams entered the Qualification, the teams were drawn into 14 groups. 11 groups with each three teams and 3 groups with two teams. The Qualification took part from November 2005 to December 2005 (except Group D which was scheduled to play in November 2005 but was postponed after the 2005 Amman bombings and played in February 2006). The Group-Winners qualified for the tournament, a Play-Off Game between the best second-placed teams from ASEAN (Myanmar) and East Asia (North Korea) was scheduled to in Kuala Lumpur on 15 February 2006. But after the withdrawal of Myanmar, the North Koreans qualified automatically. Hosts India were exempt from the qualification.

== Final tournament ==
=== Participants ===
- Australia
- China
- India
- Iran
- Iraq
- Japan
- Jordan
- North Korea
- South Korea
- Kyrgyzstan
- Malaysia
- Saudi Arabia
- Tajikistan
- Thailand
- United Arab Emirates
- Vietnam

== Venues ==
Kolkata, West Bengal
Salt Lake Stadium	Howrah Municipal Corporation Stadium
Capacity: 120,000	Capacity: 5,000
Bangalore, Karnataka
Sree Kanteerava Stadium	Bangalore Football Stadium
Capacity: 30,000	Capacity: 15,000

== Group stage ==
=== Group A ===
Team	Pts	Pld	W	D	L	GF	GA	GD
South Korea	9	3	3	0	0	13	0	+13
Jordan	4	3	1	1	1	3	5	−2
Kyrgyzstan	2	3	0	2	1	1	8	−7
India	1	3	0	1	2	3	7	−4

29 October 2006
16:00 IST

South Korea	3–0	Jordan
Shim Young-sung 14' 61'; Lee Sang-ho 46'

Salt Lake Stadium, Kolkata
Attendance: 500
Referee: Nishimura (Japan)

29 October 2006
19:00 IST

India	1–1	Kyrgyzstan
Bhowmick 71' (pen.)		Amirov 44'

Salt Lake Stadium, Kolkata
Attendance: 600
Referee: Torky (Iran)

31 October 2006
16:00 IST

Jordan	3–2	India
Abu Salim 33'; Nofal 64' 87'		Cardozo 25'; Matondkar 77'

Salt Lake Stadium, Kolkata
Attendance: 250
Referee: Irmatov (Uzbekistan)

31 October 2006
19:00 IST

Kyrgyzstan	0–7	South Korea
		Lee Sang-ho 5' 63'; Shin Young-rok 13' 50' 71' (pen.); Miagkih 20' (o.g.); Park Hyun-beom 84'

Salt Lake Stadium, Kolkata
Attendance: 300
Referee: Nishimura (Japan)

2 November 2006
14:45 IST

South Korea	3–0	India
Shim Young-sung 76'; Song Jin-hyung 84'; Shin Young-rok 90+2'

Salt Lake Stadium, Kolkata
Attendance: 500
Referee: Basma (Syria)

2 November 2006
14:45 IST

Kyrgyzstan	0–0	Jordan

Municipal Corporation Stadium, Kolkata
Attendance: 1,000
Referee: Irmatov (Uzbekistan)

=== Group B ===
Team	Pts	Pld	W	D	L	GF	GA	GD
China	9	3	3	0	0	4	1	+3
Australia	6	3	2	0	1	5	2	+3
Thailand	3	3	1	0	2	3	5	−2
United Arab Emirates	0	3	0	0	3	2	6	−4

30 October 2006
16:00 IST

China	1–0	Australia
Xu 65'

Salt Lake Stadium, Kolkata
Attendance: 300
Referee: Shaban (Kuwait)

30 October 2006
19:00 IST

Thailand	2–1	United Arab Emirates
Dangda 46'; Donchui 90+4'		Ali 89'

Salt Lake Stadium, Kolkata
Attendance: 150
Referee: Basma (Syria)

1 November 2006
16:00 IST

Australia	3–1	Thailand
Burns 26' 90+2'; Vidosic 33' (pen.)		Phukom 40' (pen.)

Salt Lake Stadium, Kolkata
Attendance: 100
Referee: Torky (Iran)

1 November 2006
19:00 IST

United Arab Emirates	1–2	China
Mesmari 49'		Wang 6' (pen.), 46'

Salt Lake Stadium, Kolkata
Attendance: 100
Referee: Shaban (Kuwait)

3 November 2006
14:45 IST

China	1–0	Thailand
Wang 78'

Salt Lake Stadium, Kolkata
Attendance: 500
Referee: Nishimura (Japan)

3 November 2006
14:45 IST

Australia	2–0	United Arab Emirates
Williams 14' 31'

Municipal Corporation Stadium, Kolkata
Attendance: 3,000
Referee: Irmatov (Uzbekistan)

=== Group C ===
Team	Pts	Pld	W	D	L	GF	GA	GD
Japan	6	3	2	0	1	7	2	+5
North Korea	6	3	2	0	1	6	2	+4
Iran	6	3	2	0	1	5	7	−2
Tajikistan	0	3	0	0	3	1	8	−7

29 October 2006
16:00 IST

Japan	2–0	North Korea
Kawahara 34'; Kashiwagi 82'

Sree Kanteerava Stadium, Bangalore
Attendance: 2,000
Referee: Ibrahim (Bahrain)

29 October 2006
19:00 IST

Iran	3–1	Tajikistan
Goudarzi 55'; Chatrabgoon 60' 81'		Khamrakulov 10'

Sree Kanteerava Stadium, Bangalore
Attendance: 3,000
Referee: Kunsuta (Thailand)

31 October 2006
16:00 IST

North Korea	5–0	Iran
Jong Chol-min 2' 10'; Kim Kum-il 25' 47'; Ri Hung-ryong 77'

Sree Kanteerava Stadium, Bangalore
Attendance: 2,000
Referee: Mujghef (Jordan)

31 October 2006
19:00 IST

Tajikistan	0–4	Japan
		Morishima 8' 34'; Kashiwagi 57'; Morishige 68'

Sree Kanteerava Stadium, Bangalore
Attendance: 2,000
Referee: Al Hilali (Oman)

2 November 2006
15:00 IST

Japan	1–2	Iran
Umesaki 22'		Kamyabinia 52'; Ale-Khamis 72'

Sree Kanteerava Stadium, Bangalore
Attendance: 1,500
Referee: Sarkar (India)

2 November 2006
15:00 IST

North Korea	1–0	Tajikistan
Pak Chol-min 90+2'

Bangalore Stadium, Bangalore
Attendance: 500
Referee: Mujghef (Jordan)

=== Group D ===
Team	Pts	Pld	W	D	L	GF	GA	GD
Iraq	7	3	2	1	0	8	3	+5
Saudi Arabia	7	3	2	1	0	6	2	+4
Vietnam	3	3	1	0	2	3	6	−3
Malaysia	0	3	0	0	3	1	7	−6

30 October 2006
16:00 IST

Iraq	2–2	Saudi Arabia
Abdul-Zahra 27'; Mohammed 82'		Kabee 9'; Al-Sahlawi 52'

Sree Kanteerava Stadium, Bangalore
Attendance: 1,000
Referee: Huang Junjie (China)

30 October 2006
19:00 IST

Malaysia	1–2	Vietnam
Khyril Muhymeen 45+1'		Bakhtiar 11' (o.g.); Nguyen Quang Tình 63'

Sree Kanteerava Stadium, Bangalore
Attendance: 1,000
Referee: Sarkar (India)

1 November 2006
16:00 IST

Saudi Arabia	2–0	Malaysia
Al-Sahlawi 13'; Ataif 60'

Sree Kanteerava Stadium, Bangalore
Attendance: 1,000
Referee: Kunsuta (Thailand)

1 November 2006
19:00 IST

Vietnam	1–3	Iraq
Nguyen Van Khai 75' (pen.)		Ali 11'; Abdul-Zahra 36' 81'

Sree Kanteerava Stadium, Bangalore
Attendance: 2,000
Referee: Abdulhameed Ebrahim (Bahrain)

3 November 2006
15:00 IST

Iraq	3–0	Malaysia
Khalaf 55'; Hussein 81'; Abdul-Zahra 83'

Sree Kanteerava Stadium, Bangalore
Attendance: 500
Referee: Al Hilali (Oman)

3 November 2006
15:00 IST

Saudi Arabia	2–0	Vietnam
J. Al-Bishi 13' (pen.); M. Al-Bishi 90'

Bangalore Stadium, Bangalore
Attendance: 1,000
Referee: Huang Junjie (China)

== Knockout stage ==
=== Bracket ===
Quarter-finals
6 November – Kolkata
South Korea	2
Australia	1
6 November – Bangalore
Japan	2
Saudi Arabia	1
6 November – Kolkata
China	1
Jordan	2
6 November – Bangalore
Iraq	0
North Korea	2

Semi-finals
9 November – Kolkata
South Korea	2 (2)
Japan (pen.)	2 (3)
9 November – Kolkata
Jordan	0
North Korea	1

Final
11 November – Kolkata
Japan	1 (3)
North Korea (pen.)	1 (5)
Third place
11 November – Kolkata
South Korea	2
Jordan	0

=== Quarter finals ===
6 November 2006
16:00 IST

South Korea	2–1	Australia
Song Jin-hyung 10' 36'		Grossman 18'

Salt Lake Stadium, Kolkata
Attendance: 600
Referee: Basma (Syria)

6 November 2006
16:00 IST

Japan	2–1	Saudi Arabia
Kawahara 7'; Aoki 90'		J. Al-Bishi 81' (pen.)

Sree Kanteerava Stadium, Bangalore
Attendance: 3,000
Referee: Al Hilali (Oman)

6 November 2006
19:00 IST

China	1–2	Jordan
Yang 70'		Omran 33'; Abdullah 68' (pen.)

Salt Lake Stadium, Kolkata
Attendance: 150
Referee: Irmatov (Uzbekistan)

6 November 2006
19:00 IST

Iraq	0–2	North Korea
		Kim Kum-il 36'; Yun Yong-il 67'

Sree Kanteerava Stadium, Bangalore
Attendance: 3,000
Referee: Subrata (India)

=== Semi finals ===
9 November 2006
16:00 IST

South Korea	2–2 (a.e.t.) (2–3 pen.)	Japan
Shim Young-sung 1'; Kim Dong-suk 111'		Morishima 47'; Aoki 105'

Salt Lake Stadium, Kolkata
Attendance: 2,000
Referee: Torky (Iran)

9 November 2006
19:00 IST

Jordan	0–1	North Korea
		Kim Kum-il 38'

Salt Lake Stadium, Kolkata
Attendance: 2,500
Referee: Surkar (India)

=== Third Place Play Off ===
12 November 2006
16:00 IST

South Korea	2–0	Jordan
Shim Young-sung 50'; Lee Chung-yong 76'

Salt Lake Stadium, Kolkata
Attendance: 5,000
Referee: Al Hilali (Oman)

=== Finals ===
12 November 2006
19:00 IST

North Korea	1–1 (a.e.t.) (5–3 pen.)	Japan
Ri Chol-myong 3'		Kashiwagi 34'

Salt Lake Stadium, Kolkata
Attendance: 10,000
Referee: Shaban (Qatar)

== Winners ==
2006 AFC Youth Championship winners

North Korea
Second title

== Qualification to World Youth Championship ==
The following teams qualified for the 2007 FIFA World Youth Championship.

- North Korea
- Japan
- South Korea
- Jordan

== Awards ==
Top Goalscorers	Most Valuable Player	Fair Play Trophy
(South Korea) Shim Young-sung	(North Korea) Kim Kum-il	North Korea

== Goalscorers ==
5 goals

- (South Korea) Shim Young-sung

4 goals

- (Iraq) Alaa Abdul-Zahra
- (North Korea) Kim Kum-il
- (South Korea) Shin Young-rok

3 goals

- (China) Wang Yongpo
- (Japan) Yasuhito Morishima
- (Japan) Yosuke Kashiwagi
- (South Korea) Lee Sang-ho
- (South Korea) Song Jin-hyung

2 goals

- (Australia) David Williams
- (Australia) Nathan Burns
- (Iran) Mostafa Chatrabgoon
- (Japan) Kazuhisa Kawahara
- (Japan) Kota Aoki
- (Jordan) Ahmed Nofal
- (North Korea) Jong Chol-min
- (Saudi Arabia) Mohammad Al-Sahlawi
- (Saudi Arabia) Jufain Al-Bishi

1 goal

- (Australia) Chris Grossman
- (Australia) Dario Vidosic
- (China) Xu De'en
- (China) Yang Xu
- (India) Branco Vincent Cardozo
- (India) Lal Kamal Bhowmick
- (India) Paresh Matondkar
- (Iran) Farhad Ale-Khamis
- (Iran) Kamaleddin Kamyabinia
- (Iran) Shahram Goudarzi
- (Iraq) Aqeel Hussein
- (Iraq) Halkurd Mulla Mohammed
- (Iraq) Mohamed Khalaf
- (Iraq) Osama Ali
- (Kyrgyzstan) Ildar Amirov
- (Japan) Masato Morishige
- (Japan) Tsukasa Umesaki
- (Jordan) Abdullah Deeb
- (Jordan) Badr Abu Salim
- (Jordan) Lo'ay Omran
- (Malaysia) Mohd Khyril Muhymeen Zambri
- (North Korea) Pak Chol-min
- (North Korea) Ri Chol-myong
- (North Korea) Ri Hung-ryong
- (North Korea) Yun Yong-il
- (Saudi Arabia) Ahmad Kabee
- (Saudi Arabia) Ali Ataif
- (Saudi Arabia) Mohamed Al-Bishi
- (South Korea) Kim Dong-suk
- (South Korea) Lee Chung-yong
- (South Korea) Park Hyun-beom
- (Tajikistan) Akhtam Khamrakulov
- (Thailand) Phonlawut Donchui
- (Thailand) Suttinun Phukhom
- (Thailand) Teerasil Dangda
- (United Arab Emirates) Seyed Ali
- (United Arab Emirates) Mubarak Mesmari
- (Vietnam) Nguyễn Quang Tình
- (Vietnam) Nguyễn Văn Khải

Own goals

- (Kyrgyzstan) Stepan Miagkih (playing against South Korea)
- (Malaysia) Baddrol Bakhtiar (playing against Vietnam)

== Top scoring teams ==
19 goals

- South Korea

12 goals

- Japan

10 goals

- North Korea

8 goals

- Iraq

7 goals

- Saudi Arabia

6 goals

- Australia

5 goals

- China
- Jordan
- Iran

3 goals

- India
- Thailand
- Vietnam

2 goal

- United Arab Emirates

1 goal

- Tajikistan
- Kyrgyzstan
- Malaysia
