= Cecil Filanckembo =

Congolese footballer

Personal information
- Full name: Cecil Magouel Filanckembo
- Date of birth: 15 April 1988 (age 38)
- Place of birth: Impfondo, Republic of the Congo
- Height: 1.75 m (5 ft 9 in)
- Position: Defender

Team information
- Current team: Vannes B

Youth career
- 2003–2007: CNFF

Senior career*
Years	Team	Apps	(Gls)
2007–2010	Auxerre II		
2010–2011	CARA Brazzaville		
2011–2013	Vannes II		
2013–2017	Saint-Colomban Sportive Locminé		
2017–2019	Vannes B		
2019–2023	Stade Pontivyen	11	(0)
2023–	Vannes B	0	(0)

International career
2007–2009	Republic of Congo U20	10	(1)
2005	Republic of Congo	6	(0)
- * Club domestic league appearances and goals as of 1 July 2023

Cecil Magouel Filanckembo (born 15 April 1988) is a Congolese professional footballer who plays as a defender for Vannes B.

== Career ==
Filanckembo began his career with Brazzaville based football Academy CNFF.

In 2007, he represented the Congo U-20 at the 2007 FIFA U-20 World Cup in Canada (four matches, one goal) and the African Youth Championship U-20. Filanckembo represented his homeland by the 2007 FIFA U-17 World Cup in Korea Republic, played four games and shot one goal by the tournament.
