= Mostafa Chatrabgoon =

Iranian football player

Personal information
- Full name: Mostafa Chatrabgoon
- Date of birth: January 6, 1987 (age 39)
- Place of birth: Kashan, Iran
- Position: Striker

Team information
- Current team: Mes Rafsanjan
- Number: 10

Youth career
- 2002–2006: Pas Tehran

Senior career*
Years	Team	Apps	(Gls)
2006–2009	Pas Tehran	46	(8)
2009–2010	Moghavemat	8	(0)
2010–2012	Gostaresh Foolad	23	(4)
2012–2013	Machine Sazi	23	(8)
2013–	Mes Rafsanjan	11	(0)

International career
2006	Iran U20	3	(2)
2007	Iran U23	1	(0)
- * Club domestic league appearances and goals as of 10 May 2013

Mostafa Chatrabgoon (born January 6, 1987) is an Iranian football player. He plays for the Azadegan League club Mes Rafsanjan as a striker.

== Club career ==
A product of the Pas Tehran's youth system, Chatrabgoon was drafted into the first team for the 2006–07 season. At the end of the season as Pas Tehran officially dissolved, he moved to Pas Hamedan along with other team members.

=== Club career statistics ===
As of 10 May 2013

Club performance			League		Cup		Continental		Total	
Season	Club	League	Apps	Goals	Apps	Goals	Apps	Goals	Apps	Goals
Iran			League		Hazfi Cup		Asia		Total	
2006–07	Pas Tehran	Persian Gulf Cup	9	3			-	-		
2007–08	Pas Hamedan	Persian Gulf Cup	34	4	2	0	-	-	36	4
2008–09	Pas Hamedan	Persian Gulf Cup	4	1	3	0	-	-	7	1
2009–10	Moghavemat	Persian Gulf Cup	8	0		0	-	-		0
Total	Iran		55	8			0	0		
Career total			55	8			0	0		

- Assist Goals

Season	Team	Assists
06–07	Pas Tehran	2
07–08	Pas Hamedan	1
09–10	Moghavemat	1

== International career ==
Mostafa Chatrabgoon was a member of Iran national under-20 football team at the 2006 AFC Youth Championship. He was also with Iran national under-23 football team, competing in the qualification games for the 2008 Summer Olympics.
