= Congo national under-20 football team =

National under-20 association football team representing Congo

Congo U-20
- Nickname(s): Ba Diabulu ya Mbwaki (The Red Devils)
- Association: Kimvuka ya nkweso ya Kongo (KNK)
- Confederation: CAF (Africa)
- Sub-confederation: UNIFFAC (Central Africa)
- Home stadium: Stade ya mbanza Kintélé; Stade Alphonse Massemba-Débat
First colours	Second colours

U-20 Africa Cup of Nations
- Appearances: 3 (first in 2007)
- Best result: Champions (2007)

FIFA U-20 World Cup
- Appearances: 1 (first in 2007)
- Best result: Round of 16 (2007)

The Congo national under-20 football team is the under-20 football (soccer) team of the Republic of the Congo. They were eliminated by South Africa in the first round of the 2013 African Youth Championship qualifiers. They also qualified but failed to get past the group stage, in the 2015 African U-20 Championship hosted in Senegal.

== Competition records ==
Champions Runners-up Third place Fourth place

- Red border color indicates tournament was held on home soil.

=== FIFA U-20 World Cup record ===
FIFA U-20 World Cup
Year	Round	Position	Pld	W	D	L	GF	GA	Squad
(Tunisia) 1977	Did not enter								
(Japan) 1979	Did not enter								
(Australia) 1981	Did not enter								
(Mexico) 1983	Did not enter								
(Soviet Union) 1985	Did not enter								
(Chile) 1987	Did not enter								
(Saudi Arabia) 1989	Did not enter								
(Portugal) 1991	Did not enter								
(Australia) 1993	Disqualified from qualification								
(Qatar) 1995	Did not enter								
(Malaysia) 1997	Did not enter								
(Nigeria) 1999	Did not qualify								
(Argentina) 2001	Did not enter								
(United Arab Emirates) 2003	Did not enter								
(Netherlands) 2005	Did not enter								
(Canada) 2007	Round of 16	13th	4	1	1	2	3	7	Squad
(Egypt) 2009	Did not qualify								
(Colombia) 2011	Did not qualify								
(Turkey) 2013	Did not qualify								
(New Zealand) 2015	Did not qualify								
(South Korea) 2017	Did not qualify								
(Poland) 2019	Did not qualify								
(Argentina) 2023	Did not qualify								
(Chile) 2025	Disqualified								
(Azerbaijan) (Uzbekistan) 2027	to be determined								
(Armenia) (Georgia (country)) 2029	to be determined								
Total	–	1/26	4	1	1	2	3	7	–

=== U-20 Africa Cup of Nations record ===
U-20 Africa Cup of Nations
Year	Round	Position	Pld	W	D	L	GF	GA	Squad
(Egypt) 1991	Withdrew before qualification								
(Mauritius) 1993	Disqualified after qualification								
(Nigeria) 1995	Withdrew before qualification								
(Morocco) 1997	Did not enter								
(Ghana) 1999	Did not qualify								
(Ethiopia) 2001	Withdrew before qualification								
(Morocco) 2003	Did not enter								
(Benin) 2005	Withdrew before qualification								
(Republic of the Congo) 2007	Champions	1st	5	4	0	1	5	1	Squad
(Rwanda) 2009	Did not qualify								
(South Africa) 2011	Did not qualify								
(Algeria) 2013	Did not qualify								
(Senegal) 2015	Group stage	7th	3	0	1	2	5	9	Squad
(Zambia) 2017	Did not qualify								
(Niger) 2019	Did not qualify								
(Mauritania) 2021	Did not qualify								
(Egypt) 2023	Quarter-finals	5th	4	1	3	0	7	6	Squad
(Egypt) 2025	Disqualified								
Total	1 title	3/18	12	5	4	3	17	16	–

A gold background colour indicates that Congo won the tournament.

*Draws include knockout matches decided on penalty kicks.

== Players ==
=== Current squad ===
The following players were selected for the 2025 Maurice Revello Tournament to be played 3–15 June 2025.

Caps and goals correct as of 13 June 2025, after the match against Panama

No.	Pos.	Player	Date of birth (age)	Caps	Goals	Club
1	GK	Yann Batola	26 January 2004 (age 22)	4	0	(French Football Federation) Granville
16	GK	Desthy Nkounkou	11 March 2005 (age 21)	0	0	(French Football Federation) Chambly Oise
3	DF	Ken Koumous	4 February 2006 (age 20)	4	0	(French Football Federation) Auxerre
4	DF	Jérémy Mounsesse	1 September 2005 (age 21)	3	0	(French Football Federation) Lyon
5	DF	Brad-Hamilton Mantsounga	6 September 2007 (age 19)	0	0	(French Football Federation) Nice
13	DF	Aaron Maniongui	20 March 2006 (age 20)	1	0	(Royal Belgian Football Association) Seraing
14	DF	César Obongo	10 July 2006 (age 20)	3	0	(French Football Federation) Dijon
18	DF	Lorick Nana	29 June 2005 (age 21)	2	0	(Italian Football Federation) Ilvamaddalena
19	DF	Steed Tchicamboud	4 January 2007 (age 19)	4	0	(French Football Federation) Le Havre
20	DF	Philippe Ndinga	3 June 2005 (age 21)	3	0	(French Football Federation) Valenciennes
21	DF	Steevy Mazikou	31 January 2004 (age 22)	3	0	(French Football Federation) Bastia
	DF	Prince Mbemba	11 April 2004 (age 22)	0	0	(Royal Spanish Football Federation) Sporting Atlético
2	MF	Lenny Dziki Loussilaho	5 May 2005 (age 21)	1	0	(French Football Federation) Dunkerque
6	MF	Kimi Gandziri	27 February 2006 (age 20)	3	0	(French Football Federation) Metz
8	MF	Keviriel Massoumou	5 July 2006 (age 20)	2	0	(French Football Federation) Ajaccio
	MF	Frédéric Loki	16 June 2004 (age 22)	0	0	(Royal Spanish Football Federation) Sporting Atlético
7	FW	Alan Bikoumou	12 January 2005 (age 21)	3	0	(French Football Federation) Sochaux
9	FW	Destin Banzouzi	3 February 2004 (age 22)	4	0	(French Football Federation) Orléans
10	FW	Abdallah Mbemba	17 November 2006 (age 19)	3	0	(French Football Federation) Le Havre
11	FW	Noah Le Bret	16 January 2005 (age 21)	4	1	(French Football Federation) Rennes
12	FW	Breyton Fougeu	6 January 2004 (age 22)	4	1	(Turkish Football Federation) Adana Demirspor
17	FW	Jason Bemba	31 March 2006 (age 20)	2	1	(French Football Federation) Sochaux
22	FW	Jean Nyindong Tsamouna	6 February 2007 (age 19)	1	1	(French Football Federation) Clermont Foot
