= CD Baza =

Spanish football club

Baza
- Full name: Club Deportivo Baza
- Founded: 1970
- Dissolved: 2016
- Ground: Constantino Navarro, Baza, Andalusia, Spain
- Capacity: 4,500
- 2015–16: Primera Andaluza – Group 4, 17th of 18
Home colours	Away colours

Club Deportivo Baza was a Spanish football team based in Baza, Granada, in the autonomous community of Andalusia. Founded in 1970, it last played in Primera Andaluza, and held home matches at Estadio Constantino Navarro, with a capacity of 4,500 seats.

In 2016, the club was dissolved, and two new clubs were founded in its place: CD Atlético Baza 2016 (founded in 2016, also folded in 2018) and CD Ciudad de Baza CP 2017 (founded in 2017).

== Season to season ==
Season	Tier	Division	Place	Copa del Rey
1973–74	6	2ª Reg.	6th	
1974–75	6	2ª Reg.	9th	
1975–76	6	2ª Reg.	6th	
1976–77	6	2ª Reg.	1st	
1977–78	6	1ª Reg.	16th	
1978–79	6	1ª Reg.	4th	
1979–80	6	1ª Reg.	1st	
1980–81	4	3ª	8th	
1981–82	4	3ª	7th	
1982–83	4	3ª	13th	
1983–84	4	3ª	12th	
1984–85	4	3ª	14th	
1985–86	4	3ª	7th	
1986–87	4	3ª	17th	First round
1987–88	4	3ª	20th	
1988–89	5	Reg. Pref.	12th	
1989–90	5	Reg. Pref.	3rd	
1990–91	5	Reg. Pref.	3rd	
1991–92	5	Reg. Pref.	1st	
1992–93	5	Reg. Pref.	1st	

Season	Tier	Division	Place	Copa del Rey
1993–94	4	3ª	5th	
1994–95	4	3ª	16th	
1995–96	4	3ª	13th	
1996–97	4	3ª	19th	
1997–98	5	Reg. Pref.	10th	
1998–99	5	Reg. Pref.	8th	
1999–2000	5	Reg. Pref.	6th	
2000–01	5	Reg. Pref.	2nd	
2001–02	4	3ª	8th	
2002–03	4	3ª	14th	
2003–04	4	3ª	7th	
2004–05	4	3ª	1st	
2005–06	3	2ª B	16th	Fourth round
2006–07	3	2ª B	12th	
2007–08	3	2ª B	16th	
2008–09	4	3ª	5th	
2009–10	4	3ª	17th	
2010–11	4	3ª	18th	
2011–12	5	1ª And.	14th	
2012–13	5	1ª And.	5th	

Season	Tier	Division	Place	Copa del Rey
2013–14	5	1ª And.	3rd	
2014–15	5	1ª And.	9th	
2015–16	5	1ª And.	17th	

- 3 seasons in Segunda División B
- 19 seasons in Tercera División

== Notable players ==
- (Argentina) Juan Pablo Vojvoda
- (Republic of the Congo) Kaster Bindoumou
- (Ghana) Prince Asubonteng
- (Paraguay) Aldo Adorno
- (Spain) Rubén Pazos
- (Spain) Álvaro del Moral
