= Tomáš Mičola =

Czech footballer

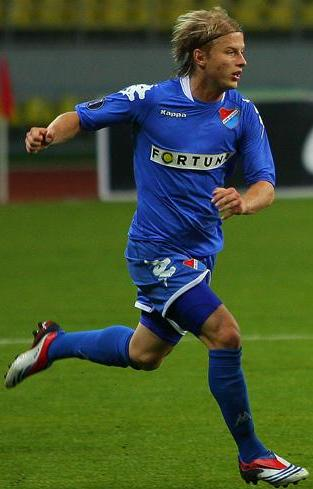

Personal information
- Full name: Tomáš Mičola
- Date of birth: 26 September 1988 (age 38)
- Place of birth: Opava, Czechoslovakia
- Height: 1.76 m (5 ft 9 1/2 in)
- Positions: Winger; striker

Team information
- Current team: Baník Ostrava B

Youth career
- 1997–2004: Opava
- 2004–2006: Baník Ostrava

Senior career*
Years	Team	Apps	(Gls)
2006–2010	Baník Ostrava	97	(17)
2010–2012	Brest	18	(1)
2012–2015	Slavia Prague	27	(7)
2015–2018	Baník Ostrava	44	(9)
2018–2019	SK Dětmarovice		
2020	Odra Petřkovice	1	(0)
2020–	Baník Ostrava B		
2021–	Baník Ostrava	0	(0)

International career
2006–2007	Czech Republic U20	10	(1)
2007–2011	Czech Republic U21	3	(1)
- * Club domestic league appearances and goals as of 20:54, 30 April 2021 (UTC)

Tomáš Mičola (born 26 September 1988) is a Czech football player.

Mičola played for Czech youth national teams since the under-16 level. He played at the 2007 FIFA U-20 World Cup, where the Czech Republic won silver medals.

== Career ==
Mičola started to play football at SFC Opava. At the age of 16 he moved to FC Baník Ostrava, where he quickly progressed and at the age of 18 started to appear in league matches. At the age of 21 he already appeared in almost 100 league matches.

Due to a knee injury, Mičola ended his professional career in 2018 and signed to play for Czech amateur club SK Dětmarovice in September 2018. In the winter 2020, Mičola moved to FC Odra Petřkovice.

In August 2020 it was confirmed, that Mičola would play for the reserve team of his former club, Baník Ostrava, with a mentor role for the young players of the team. However, on 9 February 2021, he also featured in a game for Baník Ostrava's professional team in the Czech Cup against FC Slavia Karlovy Vary where he played 27 minutes.

== Honours ==
Czech Rupublic U-21

- FIFA U-20 World Cup runner-up (1) 2007
