= Ayodeji Brown =

Nigerian professional footballer

Personal information
- Full name: Ayodeji Brown Adeniyi
- Date of birth: 12 September 1988 (age 38)
- Place of birth: Zaria, Nigeria
- Height: 1.88 m (6 ft 2 in)
- Position: Defender

Youth career
- 1996–2004: Pepsi football academy & JC.RAIDERS Jos.

Senior career*
Years	Team	Apps	(Gls)
- JC Raiders
- Enugu Rangers
- NPA FC
2006–2010	Gateway United		
2010–2011	Tavriya Simferopol	1	(0)
2012–2013	Al-Najaf		
- * Club domestic league appearances and goals as of 17:00, 2 March 2014 (UTC)

Ayodeji Brown(born 12 September 1988) is a Nigerian professional footballer who plays as a defender.

== career ==
He played at the 2007 FIFA U-20 World Cup. Brown started his footballing career at the age of eight, when he began playing for Pepsi Football Academy. He signed his first professional contract with the club Tavriya Fc, in Ukraine.

== International ==
Brown was a part of the Nigerian national under-20 football team, playing in the 2007 FIFA U-20 nation cup & World Cup in Canada.
