= Blessing Okardi =

Nigerian footballer

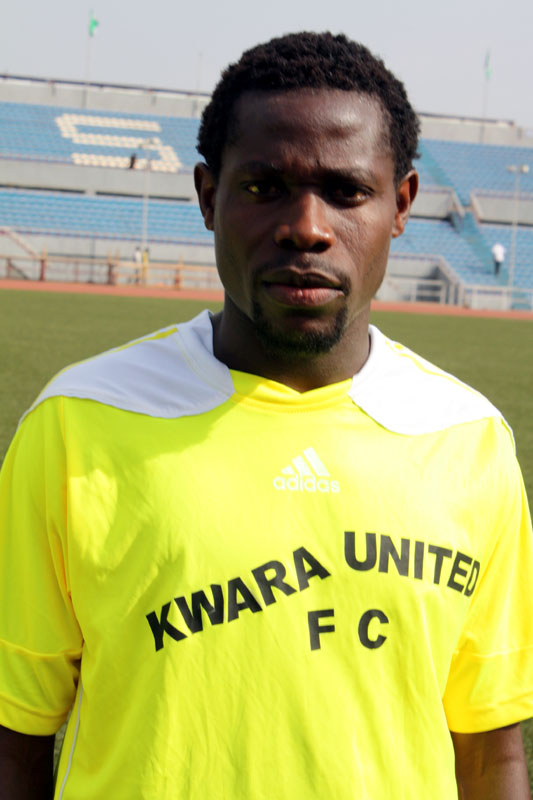

Personal information
- Full name: Blessing Okardi
- Date of birth: 5 November 1988 (age 37)
- Place of birth: Nigeria
- Height: 1.74 m (5 ft 9 in)

Team information
- Current team: Bayelsa United F.C.
- Number: 23

Senior career*
Years	Team	Apps	(Gls)
2005–2009	Ocean Boys F.C.		
2009–2012	Lobi Stars F.C.		
2012–	Bayelsa United F.C.		

International career
2007	Nigeria U-20	2	(0)
- * Club domestic league appearances and goals

Blessing Okardi (born 5 November 1988) is a football player from Nigeria, who played for Bayelsa United F.C. and currently plays for Famous All stars

== Career ==
On 27 October 2006 he was on trial by KAA Gent. With Ocean Boys he captained their 2008 Nigerian FA Cup winning team, beating Gombe United in a penalty shootout on 5 July 2008. He moved to Lobi Stars in October 2009. He was banned for one year for his part in a referee attack in March 2010. The right midfielder left on 24 November 2012 after three years his club Lobi Stars and signed for Bayelsa United F.C.

== International ==
At international level, he made two appearances for Nigeria in the 2007 FIFA U-20 World Cup, against Scotland and Costa Rica.
