= L.A. Hair =

American reality television series

- Genre: Reality television
- Starring: Kim Kimble
- Country of origin: United States
- Original language: English
- No. of seasons: 5
- No. of episodes: 51

Production
- Executive producers: D.J. Nurre; J.D. Roth; Lauren P. Gellert; Rachel Tung; Suzanne Murch; Todd A. Nelson
- Running time: 42 minutes
- Production company: Eyeworks USA

Original release
- Network: WE tv
- Release: May 31, 2012 – March 9, 2017

L.A. Hair is an American reality television series on WE tv. The series debuted on May 31, 2012 and was originally titled Hair Divas: Hollywood. The series follows celebrity stylist Kim Kimble and her staff at her salon, Kimble Hair Studio. WE tv announced in October 2012 that the series had been renewed for a ten episode second season, which debuted on June 6, 2013. WE tv has ordered a 12-episode third season that premiered on May 22, 2014. On March 3, 2015 WE tv renewed the show for a fourth season that premiered in July 2015. The fifth season of L.A. Hair premiered on January 5, 2017.

== Cast ==
=== Timeline of cast members ===
L.A. Hair cast members
Cast member	Seasons				
Cast member	1	2	3	4	5
Kim Kimble	Main	Main	Main	Main	Main
Jasmine Kimble	Main	Main	Main	Main	Main
China Upshaw	Main	Main	Main	Main	
Dontay Savoy	Main	Main	Main	Main	
Terry Hunt	Main	Main	Main	Main	
Angela Christine	Main	Main	Guest	Guest	
Anthony Pazos	Main	Main	Main	Main	
Leah Aldridge		Main	Main	Main	Main
Naja Rickette		Main	Main	Main	Main
Lisa Buford			Main	Guest	
Jonathan Antin			Guest	Main	
Gocha Hawkins			Guest	Main	Guest
James Wright					Main
Giorgio Vango					Main
Jay Jones					Main
Stacey Morris					Main
Christopher Bautista (Tiger)					Main
MaCray Huff					Main
Supporting Cast
Charity Cabico	Support				
Jose Monterroza		Support	Support		
Malaka Upshaw			Support		
Dia			Support	Support	Support

== Episodes ==
=== Series overview ===
Season	Episodes	Originally released	
Season	Episodes	First released	Last released
1	9	May 31, 2012	July 26, 2012
2	12	June 6, 2013	August 22, 2013
3	12	May 22, 2014	August 7, 2014
4	14	July 30, 2015	October 29, 2015
5	10	January 5, 2017	March 9, 2017

=== Season 1 (2012) ===
No. overall	No. in season	Title	Original release date
1	1	"Sheer Ambition"	May 31, 2012
Kelly Rowland stops by the salon to get her hair done. Kim and Angela get into a feud.
2	2	"Charity Case"	June 7, 2012
Omarosa Manigault comes into the salon for a magazine interview with Kim.
3	3	"First Cut Is the Deepest"	June 14, 2012
Angela is threatened with a breaching her contract lawsuit for bragging about styling Eve.
4	4	"Divas Divided"	June 21, 2012
Kim and Angela have lunch to ease tension and fix their friendship.
5	5	"Wigged Out"	June 28, 2012
Everyone at the salon prepares for their visit to the Academy Awards.
6	6	"China Wages War"	July 5, 2012
Kim seeks a temporary workspace as construction lags on her new studio; Kim coifs R&B singer Brandy Norwood
7	7	"Tick Tick Boom"	July 12, 2012
Jasmine messes up while styling Kim's hair before Kim's big date. Anthony and China's personalities clash which causes a verbal altercation.
8	8	"The Big Blow Out"	July 19, 2012
Kim helps China come to peace the prior events at work.
9	9	"L.A. Hair Confidential"	July 26, 2012
This episode features behind-the-scenes moments and highlights of the first season.

=== Season 2 (2013) ===
No. overall	No. in season	Title	Original release date
10	1	"The Nail Biter"	June 6, 2013
Season 2 begins with Kim opening a second location, bringing on a new nail technician and making a change in management.
11	2	"Demotion Commotion"	June 13, 2013
Leah and Naja continue to be at each other's throats and Kim tries to smooth things over between China and Angela, who is still feeling the sting of her demotion.
12	3	"What Happens in Vegas"	June 20, 2013
Kim announces a salon contest and sticks herself in the middle of the fighting between Angela and China. Meanwhile, a trip to Las Vegas gets interesting when Naja seduces another member of the team.
13	4	"VIP Blow Out"	June 27, 2013
Rumors begin to swirl around Naja and Dontay after they return from Las Vegas. Kim loses patience with Leah and her hair and things between Angela and China remain heated.
14	5	"Hater From Decatur"	July 4, 2013
The staff react negatively to having to wear uniforms and Dontay is unhappy about Kim wanting him to work as Terry's assistant. Anthony is given the opportunity to do actress Jessica Clark's hair and makeup for a red-carpet event.
15	6	"Don't Mess With My Mama"	July 11, 2013
Kim books an important fashion show and Anthony disses Jasmine's hairdressing skills.
16	7	"Career Suicide"	July 18, 2013
Kim gets wind of what Anthony has been saying about her mother on the salon floor and an annoyed Naja makes threats to Leah.
17	8	"She Wet the Wig"	July 25, 2013
Things don't go smoothly between China and celebrity client Vivica A. Fox. Kim hires a new receptionist based more on his appearance than qualifications and Leah has a problem with the staff returning to work after having a few adult beverages.
18	9	"Drinking and Weaving"	August 1, 2013
Naja calls China out for behaving unprofessionally. Jose gets caught with his shirt off and Leah forces three staff members to leave the salon.
19	10	"Bringing Sexy Back"	August 8, 2013
Kim revamps singer Michelle Williams. Meanwhile, Angela takes off to Thailand without notice, and Kim and Leah clash over a photo shoot.
20	11	"You're Fired"	August 15, 2013
Kim and the stylists style two friends of Chaka Khan. Angela returns from Thailand and is in hot water. Kim fires Angela.
21	12	"L.A. Hair Confidential"	August 22, 2013
Never before seen footage of the season. Dontay and Angela discuss her firing

=== Season 3 (2014) ===
No. overall	No. in season	Title	Original release date
22	1	"Chair Battle Royale"	May 22, 2014
23	2	"A Thin Line Between Love and Fake"	May 29, 2014
Kim deals with the aftermath of Lisa and Anthony’s big fight. China’s sister is the new salon receptionist. Kim gives Macy Gray big hair while Angela ends up in a brawl with Naja at her own salon launch party.
24	3	"Hotlanta, Hair We Come"	June 5, 2014
Kim styles R&B group SWV and opens a pop-up shop in Atlanta. Leah opposes the second location leading to an explosive argument with Kim. Musician Akon reprimands Anthony while Naja's feud with Angela persists.
25	4	"Lisa and the Ratcheteers"	June 12, 2014
26	5	"Clash of the Big Wigs"	June 19, 2014
27	6	"Taming of the Divas"	June 26, 2014
28	7	"Stick a Fork in It"	July 3, 2014
29	8	"Ready, Set, Blow!"	July 10, 2014
30	9	"For the Record"	July 17, 2014
31	10	"A Tale of Two Cakes"	July 24, 2014
A celebration erupts into a salon clearing brawl when simmering hostilities between Lisa and Naja are sparked by a flip comment from Dontay. Naja is sent to Urgent Care and Lisa clears her station.
32	11	"Big Hair, Don't Care"	July 31, 2014
Lisa and Naja's fight leaves the salon in turmoil. Kim returns to Atlanta to headline the Bronner Bros Hair Show, and makes a surprise announcement that sends Leah into a rage. Kim styles Sanaa Lathan.
33	12	"99 Problems, But Hair Ain't One"	August 7, 2014
Kim risks her hair empire with an extreme business move; Leah is outraged. Terry clashes with the Atlanta stylists. Naja returns to the salon with shocking news. Lisa is presented with a surprise proposal.

=== Season 4 (2015) ===
No. overall	No. in season	Title	Original release date
34	1	"I'm the Boss, Hunty!"	July 30, 2015
35	2	"Catwalk, Cat Fight"	August 6, 2015
36	3	"Nail'd by Naja"	August 13, 2015
37	4	"Wigs in the Wild"	August 20, 2015
38	5	"Lights, Camera, Meltdown!"	August 27, 2015
39	6	"Model Behavior"	September 3, 2015
40	7	"A Hair-Raising Proposal"	September 10, 2015
41	8	"The Kim-pire Strikes Back"	September 17, 2015
42	9	"Weave Got an Informant!"	September 24, 2015
43	10	"Hair Today, Gone Tomorrow"	October 1, 2015
44	11	"Time for Some Hair-therapy"	October 8, 2015
45	12	"Snitches Get Stitches"	October 15, 2015
46	13	"Shade and Betrayed"	October 22, 2015
47	14	"L.A. Hair Confidential"	October 29, 2015

=== Season 5 (2017) ===
No. overall	No. in season	Title	Original release date
48	1	"The Kimpire Strikes Back"	January 5, 2017
49	2	"Go Big or Go-Shady"	January 12, 2017
50	3	"Down Wright Shade"	January 19, 2017
51	4	"Making the Cut"	January 26, 2017
52	5	"I Snatched Your Weave!"	February 2, 2017
53	6	"Put Your Business Panties On!"	February 9, 2017
54	7	"MaCray Cray Like.. Wo!"	February 16, 2017
55	8	"Hair Du Soleil!"	February 23, 2017
56	9	"Hair We Go!"	March 2, 2017
57	10	"L.A. Hair Confidential"	March 9, 2017
