= Amadou Séré =

Burkinabé footballer

Personal information
- Date of birth: December 30, 1987 (age 38)
- Place of birth: Ouagadougou, Upper Volta
- Position: Goalkeeper

Team information
- Current team: Etoile Filante Ouagadougou
- Number: 16

Youth career
- 2006–2007: Etoile Filante Ouagadougou

Senior career*
Years	Team	Apps	(Gls)
2007–	Etoile Filante Ouagadougou		

International career
2006–2007	Burkina Faso U-21	9	(0)
2009–	Burkina Faso		
- * Club domestic league appearances and goals

Amadou Séré (born 30 December 1987 in Ouagadougou) is a Burkinabé football (soccer) goalkeeper with Etoile Filante Ouagadougou of the Burkinabé Premier League.

== Career ==
Séré began his career on 16 April 2006 with Etoile Filante Ouagadougou and was one year later in summer 2007 promoted to first team who plays in the Burkinabé Premier League.

== International ==
Séré capped with the Burkina Faso national football team and presented his homeland at 2007 UEMOA Tournament. He was also member for Burkina Faso at 2007 African Youth Championship in Congo.
