= Anthony Pazos =

American hairdresser

- Born: Torrance, California, U.S.

Anthony Pazos is an American television personality, celebrity stylist, and entrepreneur from Los Angeles, California.

== Early life ==
Born and raised in Torrance, California, Pazos graduated with an AA and license in cosmetology.

Pazos was born to a Bolivian-Welsh mother and Mexican-Peruvian father. He is the great-grandson of Peruvian sculptor Carlos Pazos, known for his bronze bust made for President John F. Kennedy. He grew up eating traditional dishes made by his Peruvian grandfather, who was also a restaurateur. In 2013, Pazos described his family as "culturally diverse and loving".

== Career ==
Anthony Pazos began his televised career at a very young age. His first television appearances were on the Style Network's Split Ends and How Do I Look. He later appeared on WE tv's L.A. Hair, where he starred in four seasons and over 50 episodes.

Pazos' work has been featured in publications such as Allure, Backstage, Vanity Fair, Glamour, Vogue Italia, Maxim, The Hollywood Reporter, Redbook, Shape, Wired, Venice, Fader and Curve magazines. Currently working as a freelancer, social media influencer, and salon owner, he divides his time between private clients, editorial shoots and film projects. He also runs a hair and makeup agency which sends artists to high-end events.

On his choice to be a hairdresser, Pazos writes, "My mission is not to simply make someone look 'pretty', but unveil their true beauty to the world."

Throughout his career, Anthony has worked with such entertainers as Ashley Greene, the Kardashians, Leighton Meester, One Direction, among others. Anthony worked alongside Beyonce Knowles for her 2016 VMA performance and her Super Bowl 50 performance.

== Personal life ==
After obtaining a license in cosmetology, Pazos began “popping around from studio to studio” in Beverly Hills. He finally settled in West Hollywood at his own private studio suite, where he sees celebrity clientele and creates digital media for high-end beauty organizations such as Coty and SalonCentric.

In 2011, Pazos adopted two pit bulls named Kenny Powers and Peanut Butter. In 2023, Pazos married actor Bill Parks; the two had been partners for 18 years.
