= Iyam Friday =

Nigerian footballer

Personal information
- Date of birth: 1 December 1989 (age 36)
- Place of birth: Kaduna, Nigeria
- Height: 1.76 m (5 ft 9 in)
- Position: Midfielder

Team information
- Current team: SalPa
- Number: 5

Senior career*
Years	Team	Apps	(Gls)
2006	Kaduna United F.C.		
2007–2008	AC Oulu	28	(1)
2009	PP 70	5	(1)
2010–2013	Atlantis FC	51	(10)
2014–	SalPa	1	(0)
- * Club domestic league appearances and goals as of April 24, 2014

Iyam Friday (born 1 December 1989 in Kaduna) is a Nigerian footballer, who currently plays for FC Viikingit.
