= Mé Aboubacar Diomandé =

Ivorian footballer (1988–2019)

Aboubacar Diomandé
Personal information
- Full name: Aboubacar Mé Diomandé
- Date of birth: 7 May 1988
- Place of birth: Abidjan, Ivory Coast
- Date of death: 9 August 2019 (aged 31)
- Place of death: Janjgir-Champa, Chhattisgarh, India
- Positions: Midfielder; winger

Youth career
- –2005: Académie de Sol Beni

Senior career*
Years	Team	Apps	(Gls)
2005–2006	ASEC Mimosas	?	(?)
2006–2007	Charlton Athletic		
2006–2007	→ Germinal Beerschot (loan)		
2007–2019	Stella Club d'Adjamé		

International career
2007–2010	Ivory Coast	0	(0)
- * Club domestic league appearances and goals as of 13 August 2019

Aboubacar Mé Diomandé (7 May 1988 – 9 August 2019) was an Ivorian footballer who played as midfielder.

== Club career ==
Mé Diomandé began his career with Académie de Sol Beni and was promoted to the first team in January 2005. In January 2007, he was on trial at Charlton Athletic and then moved in July 2007 to Stella Club d'Adjamé.

== International career ==
He was nominated for the Tournoi de l'UEMOA 2007 for Ivory Coast. Diomandé played for the Elephants at the 2009 African Nations Championship in Ivory Coast, here he represented the team as captain.

== Death ==
On 9 August 2019, Diomandé was found dead on railway tracks on the Mumbai-Howrah route in Janjgir-Champa district of Chhattisgarh state of India.

His mutilated body was recovered from the tracks near Baradwar railway station. According to Sub-divisional Officer of Police (SDOP) Champa area Udyan Behar, the player was identified through the mobile recovered from near his body. The police were able to identify the player through the identification documents which were in the mobile.

After investigation, the police concluded that the player would have landed in the country on 8 August 2019 and was travelling to join his new teammates in Kolkata.

The further conclusions detail the midfielder to have fallen from the train.

The police tried to look for missing bags from the trains at Howrah station but weren't successful in finding any.
