= Nyambe Mulenga =

Zambian footballer (born 1987)

Personal information
- Full name: Henry Nyambe Mulenga
- Date of birth: August 27, 1987 (age 39)
- Place of birth: Chingola, Zambia
- Height: 5 ft 11 in (1.80 m)
- Position: Defender

Team information
- Current team: ZESCO United F.C.
- Number: 5

Senior career*
Years	Team	Apps	(Gls)
2006–2007	Forest Rangers		
2008–2017	ZESCO United F.C.		
2014	→ Power Dynamos F.C. (loan)		

International career^{‡}
- Zambia U20
2008–2015	Zambia	38	(3)
- * Club domestic league appearances and goals ‡ National team caps and goals as of 2015-04-01

Henry Nyambe Mulenga (born 27 August 1987 in Chingola) is a Zambian former footballer.

== Career ==
Nyambe Mulenga started his career for Forest Rangers, before signed in December 2007 for ZESCO United F.C. In April 2014 left ZESCO United F.C. and joined to League rival Power Dynamos F.C. on a season long loan deal.

He last played in the defence for ZESCO United F.C. in the Zambian Premier League, before on 20 January 2017 retired.

== Career ==
Mulenga was part of the Zambian U-20 side which made the quarterfinals of the 2007 FIFA U-20 World Cup in Canada. He is a physical central defender, supported by the notion he was suspended for two of the four games Zambian played in the tournament, due to red card accumulation.

In December 2014 he was involved in a road accident, breaking his leg.

== Honours ==
=== National team ===
Zambia

- Africa Cup of Nations: 2012
