= Tsukasa Umesaki =

Japanese footballer

Personal information
- Full name: Tsukasa Umesaki
- Date of birth: 23 February 1987 (age 39)
- Place of birth: Isahaya, Nagasaki, Japan
- Height: 1.69 m (5 ft 7 in)
- Position: Attacking midfielder

Team information
- Current team: Oita Trinita
- Number: 7

Youth career
- 2002–2004: Oita Trinita

Senior career*
Years	Team	Apps	(Gls)
2005–2007	Oita Trinita	47	(5)
2007	→ Grenoble (loan)	5	(0)
2008–2017	Urawa Red Diamonds	200	(25)
2018–2021	Shonan Bellmare	56	(6)
2021–	Oita Trinita	50	(4)

International career^{‡}
2005–2007	Japan U20	11	(3)
2008	Japan U23	3	(1)
2006	Japan	1	(0)
Medal record
Representing Japan
AFC U-19 Championship
Silver medal – second place	2006 India
- * Club domestic league appearances and goals as of 23 October 2022 ‡ National team caps and goals as of 22 February 2010

Tsukasa Umesaki (梅崎 司, Umesaki Tsukasa; born 23 February 1987) is a Japanese professional footballer who plays for Oita Trinita as an attacking midfielder.

== Club career ==
Umesaki is a product of Oita's youth system and was promoted to the top team in 2005. Umesaki made his J-League debut on 10 July 2005 in a match against Sanfrecce Hiroshima at Oita "Big Eye" Stadium. He became a regular in the 2006 season.

In January 2007, he was loaned out to French Ligue 2 side Grenoble Foot 38, but returned to Oita prior to the completion of his six-month loan.

On 26 December 2007, Urawa Red Diamonds announced his signing from Oita on a full transfer.

== International career ==
In July 2007, Umsaki was elected Japan U-20 national team for 2007 U-20 World Cup. At this tournament, he played all 4 matches as left midfielder and scored a goal against Scotland in first match.

Umesaki made his international debut for Japan on 6 September 2006 in a 2007 Asian Cup qualification against Yemen when he was sent on to the pitch by national coach Ivica Osim to replace Seiichiro Maki in the injury time of the second half.

== Career statistics ==
=== Club ===
As of 17 February 2020

Appearances and goals by club, season and competition
Club	Season	League		National cup (Note: Includes Emperor's Cup.)		League cup (Note: Includes J. League Cup.)		AFC		Other (Note: Includes Japanese Super Cup, J. League Championship, J.League Cup / Copa Sudamericana Championship and FIFA Club World Cup.)		Total	
Club	Season	Apps	Goals	Apps	Goals	Apps	Goals	Apps	Goals	Apps	Goals	Apps	Goals
Oita Trinita U-18	2002	–		2	0	–		–		–		2	0
Oita Trinita U-18	2004	–		3	2	–		–		–		2	0
Oita Trinita	2005	3	0	1	0	1	0	–		–		5	0
Oita Trinita	2006	25	3	1	0	5	1	–		–		31	4
Oita Trinita	2007	19	2	2	1	–		–		–		21	3
Grenoble (loan)	2006–07	5	0	–		–		–		–		5	0
Urawa Red Diamonds	2008	22	1	1	0	4	2	1	0	–		30	3
Urawa Red Diamonds	2009	9	0	1	0	0	0	–		–		10	0
Urawa Red Diamonds	2010	2	0	0	0	0	0	–		–		2	0
Urawa Red Diamonds	2011	13	2	2	0	5	1	–		–		20	3
Urawa Red Diamonds	2012	33	7	2	0	1	0	–		–		36	7
Urawa Red Diamonds	2013	28	2	2	0	4	1	4	1	–		37	4
Urawa Red Diamonds	2014	33	4	1	1	5	1	–		–		39	6
Urawa Red Diamonds	2015	31	8	4	0	2	0	3	0	2	0	42	8
Urawa Red Diamonds	2016	19	1	0	0	1	0	8	0	–		28	1
Urawa Red Diamonds	2017	10	0	2	0	1	0	4	0	1	0	28	1
Shonan Bellmare	2018	29	4	1	0	11	4	–		–		41	8
Shonan Bellmare	2019	23	2	1	0	3	1	–		1	0	28	3
Career total		304	36	26	4	43	11	20	1	4	0	407	53

=== International ===
Appearances and goals by national team and year
National team	Year	Apps	Goals
Japan U-20	2005	2	1
Japan U-20	2006	5	1
Japan U-20	2007	4	1
Total		11	3
Japan U-23	2008	3	1
Total		3	1
Japan	2006	1	0
Total		1	0

== Honours ==
=== Club ===
Urawa Red Diamonds

- AFC Champions League: 2017
- J.League Cup: 2016
