= Salif Dianda =

Burkinabé footballer (born 1987)

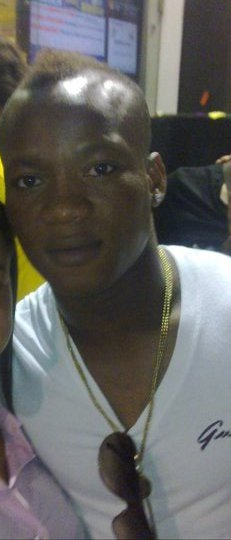

Personal information
- Full name: Salif Dianda
- Date of birth: 17 December 1987 (age 38)
- Place of birth: Adzopé, Ivory Coast
- Height: 1.74 m (5 ft 8 1/2 in)
- Position: Midfielder

Team information
- Current team: ASD Ferentillo-Valnerina

Senior career*
Years	Team	Apps	(Gls)
2006–2012	Hellas Verona	13	(0)
2007	→ Lugano (loan)	10	(1)
2008	→ Vibonese (loan)	10	(0)
2009–2010	→ Sangiovannese (loan)	31	(3)
2010–2011	→ Juve Stabia (loan)	20	(0)
2011–2012	→ Ternana (loan)	32	(0)
2012–2016	Ternana	35	(1)
2016	Martina Franca	18	(0)
2017	Corregese	14	(1)
2017–2018	Romanese Calcio	24	(2)
2018–	ASD Ferentillo-Valnerina		

International career
–2007	Burkina Faso U20		
2008	Burkina Faso	1	(0)
- * Club domestic league appearances and goals as of 1 December 2017

Salif Dianda (born 17 December 1987) is a Burkinabé footballer who plays for ASD Ferentillo-Valnerina as a midfielder.

== Biography ==
Born in Adzopé to Burkinabé parents, Dianda arrived in Italy in 2004. He obtained a temporary resident permit on 10 August 2005 and became eligible to sign win any Italian club in 2006, after one year legal residence. Despite being a non-EU player, Dianda eligible to sign by Italian club because Dianda previously did not have any football education outside Italy. Hellas Verona F.C. offered him a contract before 10 August 2006 and tried to appeal to FIGC in order to make him eligible before that date but failed.

Dianda made his first team debut in 2006–07 Serie B, on 11 November 2006. In January 2007, Dianda left for Swiss Challenge League club Lugano. Verona relegated at the end of season. In January 2008 Dianda left for Serie C2 club Vibonese. Dianda only played 4 games in 2008–09 Lega Pro Prima Divisione.

In August 2009 he left for Sangiovannese. Co-currently Davide Bertolucci left for Verona. In August 2010 Dianda left for S.S. Juve Stabia in temporary deal and signed a new 2-year contract with Verona.

On 31 August 2011 Dianda was signed by Ternana. The club won Lega Pro Prima Divisione Group B but losing to Group A champion Spezia in the grand final of the league. At the end of season he was signed in co-ownership deal.

On 21 June 2013 Ternana acquired him outright. On 29 July 2015 he signed a new 1-year contract with club.

In September 2019, Dianda joined ASD Ferentillo-Valnerina.

=== International career ===
He was the captain of the Burkina Faso national under-20 football team. He was in the squad for 2007 African Youth Championship.

== Honours ==
- Lega Pro Prima Divisione: 2012 (Ternana)
- Coppa Italia Lega Pro: 2011 (Juve Stabia)
