= Rubén Pazos =

Spanish footballer (born 1979)

Personal information
- Full name: Rubén Arriaza Pazos
- Date of birth: 26 August 1979 (age 47)
- Place of birth: Jerez de la Frontera, Spain
- Height: 1.86 m (6 ft 1 in)
- Position: Midfielder

Senior career*
Years	Team	Apps	(Gls)
2000–2001	Real Madrid C	14	(1)
2001–2004	Ceuta	88	(2)
2004–2007	Xerez	14	(1)
2007	Zamora	12	(0)
2007–2008	Baza	26	(0)
2008–2009	Portuense	17	(0)
2009–2010	Lorca Deportiva		
2010–2012	Sanluqueño	?	(1)
- * Club domestic league appearances and goals

Rubén Arriaza Pazos (born 26 August 1979) is a Spanish retired footballer who played as a defensive midfielder.

== Football career ==
Born in Jerez de la Frontera, Province of Cádiz, Pazos played most of his career in the Spanish third division, representing several clubs. He started his senior career with Real Madrid C, in the fourth level.

From June 2004 to January 2007, Pazos had an unassuming spell in division two for hometown side Xerez CD, making his debut in the competition on 12 September 2004 by coming on as a 78th-minute substitute in a 1–0 home win against Polideportivo Ejido. In the summer of 2008, he signed with Racing Club Portuense.
