= Dennis Banda =

Zambian footballer (born 1988)

Personal information
- Full name: Dennis Banda
- Date of birth: December 10, 1988 (age 37)
- Place of birth: Lusaka, Zambia
- Position: Defender

Youth career
- 2001–2007: Green Buffaloes FC

Senior career*
Years	Team	Apps	(Gls)
2007–2017	Green Buffaloes FC	97	(12)

International career
2006–2007	Zambia U20	9	(0)
2006–2012	Zambia	27	(0)
- * Club domestic league appearances and goals

Dennis Banda (born 10 December 1988) is a Zambian former professional footballer who played as a defender. He spent his whole club career with Green Buffaloes in Zambia. He had several proposals to play in the season 2010/11 in Europe or South America where his FIFA agent Marcelo Houseman was working on several deals. He has played for the senior team on 29 occasions including in World Cup qualifications and in the African Nations Cup.

== International career ==
He played for the Zambia national team and played for his country at the 2007 FIFA U-20 World Cup in Canada.
