= Destin Onka Malonga =

Congolese footballer (1988–2016)

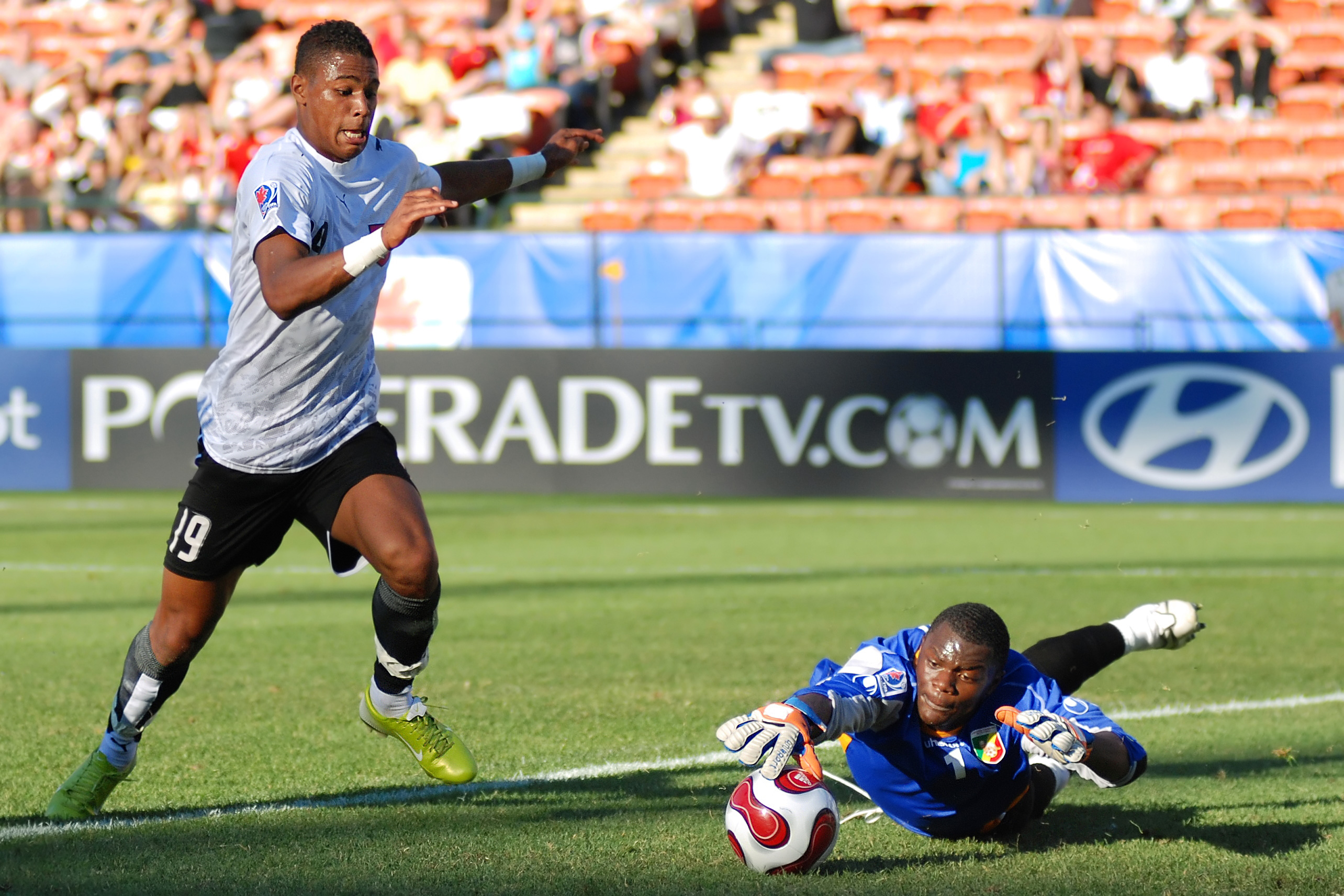
- Austrian forward Rubin Okotie (left) tries to score past Onka at the 2007 FIFA U-20 World Cup

Personal information
- Full name: Destin Chancel Onka Malonga
- Date of birth: 16 March 1988
- Place of birth: Brazzaville, Republic of the Congo
- Date of death: 31 July 2016 (aged 28)
- Place of death: Vallon-Pont-d'Arc, France
- Height: 1.90 m (6 ft 3 in)
- Position: Goalkeeper

Senior career*
Years	Team	Apps	(Gls)
2006	Diables Noirs		
2007	AC CNFF		
2008	Diables Noirs		
2008–2010	MSP Batna	19	(0)
2010–2011	AS Contres		
2011–2015	AF Lozère		
2015–2016	Alès	22	(0)

International career
2009	Congo	1	(0)

Managerial career
- 2014–2016: Entente Gévaudan (goalkeeper coach)
- * Club domestic league appearances and goals

Destin Chancel Onka Malonga (16 March 1988 – 31 July 2016) was a Congolese professional footballer who played as a goalkeeper.

== Club career ==
Born in Brazzaville, Congo, Malonga played professionally for MSP Batna in the Algerian Championnat National, before joining AS Contres of the French Division Honneur in 2010. After just one year left the club and signed for AF Lozère.

== International career ==
Malonga made a full international debut for Congo on 14 November 2009 in a friendly against Angola, for his only international appearance.

== Coaching career ==
Besides playing goalkeeper he also coached the Feminine football club Entente Gévaudan.

== Personal life ==
Destin Onka died on 31 July 2016 at Vallon-Pont-d'Arc, Ardèche, France in a canoeing accident during pre-season club training.
