= Yves Djidda =

Cameroonian footballer

Personal information
- Full name: Yves Djidda
- Date of birth: July 14, 1988 (age 38)
- Place of birth: Cameroon
- Position: Striker

Team information
- Current team: Gokulam FC
- Number: 11

Senior career*
Years	Team	Apps	(Gls)
2006–2007	Union Douala	20	(9)
2007–2008	Hapoel Nazareth Illit	19	(11)
2008–2009	Hakoah Ramat-Gan	21	(13)
2009–2014	Maccabi Nazareth	69	(40)
2017–	Gokulam FC	0	(0)
- * Club domestic league appearances and goals

Yves Djidda (born July 14, 1988) is a retired footballer from Cameroon who most recently played for Gokulam FC.

== Career ==
Djidda began his career in Cameroon and when he came to Israel he played for Hakoah Amidar Ramat Gan F.C. After that he moved to Maccabi Ahi Nazareth and he represented his new team against his previous team and scored a goal in the second play-off game, that helped his club to promote to the upper league.

== Position ==
Djidda plays as a striker.
