= Jacob Banda =

Zambian international footballer (born 1988)

Personal information
- Full name: Jacob Banda
- Date of birth: 11 February 1988 (age 38)
- Position: Goalkeeper

Team information
- Current team: ZESCO United

Senior career*
Years	Team	Apps	(Gls)
2005–	ZESCO United		

International career^{‡}
2008–	Zambia	25	(0)
- * Club domestic league appearances and goals as of 08:52, 21 June 2018 (UTC) ‡ National team caps and goals as of 08:52, 21 June 2018 (UTC)

Jacob Banda (born 11 February 1988) is a Zambian international footballer who plays for ZESCO United, as a goalkeeper.
