= Sebastian Mwansa =

Zambian footballer (born 1988)

Personal information
- Full name: Sebastian Mwansa Chipasha
- Date of birth: 21 September 1988 (age 38)
- Place of birth: Mufulira, Zambia
- Height: 1.71 m (5 ft 7 in)
- Position: Winger

Team information
- Current team: Nkwazi F.C.

Senior career*
Years	Team	Apps	(Gls)
2004–2009	Green Buffaloes F.C.		
2010–2011	TP Mazembe		
2012	Power Dynamos F.C.		
2013–2017	Green Buffaloes F.C.		
2018–	Nkwazi F.C.		

International career
2005–2012	Zambia	13	(0)
- * Club domestic league appearances and goals

Sebastian Mwansa (born 21 September 1988) is a Zambian football winger who currently plays for Nkwazi F.C.
