= Romaric Kablan =

Ivorian footballer (born 1988)

Romaric
Personal information
- Full name: Bosson Kablan Romaric
- Date of birth: 12 April 1988 (age 38)
- Place of birth: Abidjan, Ivory Coast
- Height: 1.82 m (5 ft 11 1/2 in)
- Position: Centre-back

Team information
- Current team: Aves
- Number: 15

Youth career
- 2006−2007: Stella Club

Senior career*
Years	Team	Apps	(Gls)
2007–2009	Desportivo Chaves	3	(0)
2009–2010	Freamunde	20	(1)
2010–2011	Desportivo Chaves	28	(0)
2011–	Aves	78	(3)
- * Club domestic league appearances and goals as of 3 September 2014

Bosson Kablan Romaric (born 12 April 1988), simply Romaric, is an Ivorian footballer who plays for C.D. Aves as a defender.
