= Jean-Noël Lingani =

Burkinabé footballer

Personal information
- Full name: Jean-Noël Dominique Lingani
- Date of birth: 12 December 1988 (age 37)
- Position: Defender

Team information
- Current team: Horoya

Senior career*
Years	Team	Apps	(Gls)
2005–2011	Étoile Filante		
2011–2012	RC Kadiogo		
2013–2016	Horoya		
2016–2017	Étoile Filante		
2017–	Horoya		

International career^{‡}
2013–	Burkina Faso	7	(0)
- * Club domestic league appearances and goals as of 10:04, 31 August 2018 (UTC) ‡ National team caps and goals as of 10:04, 31 August 2018 (UTC)

Jean-Noël Dominique Lingani (born 12 December 1988) is a Burkinabé international footballer who plays for Horoya in Guinea as a defender.

== Career ==
He played for Étoile Filante, RC Kadiogo and Horoya.

He made his international debut for Burkina Faso in 2013.
