= Ken Jammeh =

Gambian footballer

Personal information
- Full name: Ken Malamin Jammeh
- Date of birth: November 18, 1987 (age 38)
- Place of birth: Gambia
- Height: 1.75 m (5 ft 9 in)
- Position: Midfielder

Youth career
- 2005–2008: Banjul Hawks FC

Senior career*
Years	Team	Apps	(Gls)
2008–2009	Hakoah Amidar Ramat Gan F.C.	8	(0)
2009	Atlantis FC	8	(0)
2010–2012	FC KooTeePee	29	(1)

International career
2007	Gambia U20	3	(0)
- * Club domestic league appearances and goals as of May 3, 2013

Ken Malamin Jammeh (born November 18, 1987) is a Gambian former footballer.
