= Agripa Mbewe =

Zambian footballer (born 1987)

Personal information
- Date of birth: 30 January 1987 (age 39)
- Position: Forward

Senior career*
Years	Team	Apps	(Gls)
2004–2005	Nchanga Rangers F.C.		
2006	Nakambala Leopards F.C.		
2007	National Assembly F.C.		
2008–2016	Red Arrows F.C.		

International career
2009	Zambia	1	(0)
- * Club domestic league appearances and goals

Agripa Mbewe (born 30 January 1987) is a retired Zambian football striker.
