= Joseph Zimba =

Zambian footballer (born 1988)

Personal information
- Date of birth: 1 August 1988 (age 38)
- Place of birth: Lusaka, Zambia
- Height: 1.53 m (5 ft 0 in)
- Position: Defender

Team information
- Current team: Red Arrows F.C.

Senior career*
Years	Team	Apps	(Gls)
2008–	Red Arrows F.C.		

International career
2008–2015	Zambia	3	(0)
- * Club domestic league appearances and goals

Joseph Zimba (born 1 August 1988) is a Zambian football defender who currently plays for Red Arrows F.C.
