= 2007 FIFA U-20 World Cup =

16th FIFA U-20 World Cup, held in Canada in 2007

FIFA U-20 World Cup Canada 2007 Coupe du Monde de Football des Moins de 20 ans 2007
- 2007 FIFA U-20 World Cup official logo

Tournament details
- Host country: Canada
- Dates: 30 June – 22 July
- Teams: 24 (from 6 confederations)
- Venues: 6 (in 6 host cities)

Final positions
- Champions: Argentina (6th title)
- Runners-up: Czech Republic
- Third place: Chile
- Fourth place: Austria

Tournament statistics
- Matches played: 52
- Goals scored: 135 (2.6 per match)
- Attendance: 1,195,299 (22,987 per match)
- Top scorer: (Argentina) Sergio Agüero (6 goals)
- Best player: (Argentina) Sergio Agüero
- Fair play award: Japan

The 2007 FIFA U-20 World Cup was the 16th edition of the FIFA U-20 World Cup (formerly called the FIFA World Youth Championship), hosted by Canada from 30 June to 22 July 2007. Argentina defeated the Czech Republic in the title game by the score of 2–1, thus managing a back-to-back world title, its fifth in the past seven editions, and sixth overall. Argentine player Sergio Agüero was given the FIFA U-20 Golden Shoe (top scorer, with six goals) and the FIFA U-20 Golden Ball (best player of the tournament), while Japan earned the FIFA Fair Play Award.

The tournament featured 24 teams coming from six continental confederations; Canada qualified automatically as hosts, while the remaining teams qualified based on their rankings at the respective continental U-20 (U-19 in Europe's case) tournaments. UEFA (Europe) qualified six teams; AFC (Asia), CAF (Africa), CONCACAF (North, Central America and Caribbean) and CONMEBOL (South America) four teams each; and OFC (Oceania) one team.

The tournament took place in a variety of venues across the country – Toronto, Edmonton, Montreal, Ottawa, Victoria and Burnaby (Vancouver) – with the showcase stadium being Toronto's new National Soccer Stadium (Note: "National Soccer Stadium" was the temporary name of the BMO Field during this tournament, as FIFA prohibits sponsorship of stadia unless the stadium sponsor is also an official FIFA sponsor.) where the final match was held.

On 28 June 2007, two days before the inaugural match, it was reported that 950,000 tickets had been sold, making it the largest single-sport event ever taking place in the country, and on 3 July, the tournament organizers sold the millionth ticket. On 19 July, the semi-final match between Chile and Argentina marked this edition as the most attended in the tournament's history, with an accumulated attendance of 1,156,187 spectators, surpassing Mexico 1983's 1,155,160 spectators. Attendance totalled 1,195,299 after the final match.

== Bids ==
Three countries launched bids to host the competition: Canada, Japan and South Korea. On 6 August 2004 the FIFA Emergency Committee unanimously awarded the rights to host the event to Canada over South Korea (Japan did not submit an official bid).

== Venues ==
Montreal	Edmonton	Ottawa
Olympic Stadium	Commonwealth Stadium	Frank Clair Stadium
Capacity: 66,308	Capacity: 60,081	Capacity: 26,559
45°33′29″N 73°33′07″W	53°33′35″N 113°28′34″W	45°23′56″N 75°41′04″W
2007 FIFA U-20 World Cup is located in Canada
Toronto	Victoria	Burnaby
National Soccer Stadium	Royal Athletic Park	Swangard Stadium
Capacity: 20,195	Capacity: 14,500	Capacity: 10,000
43°38′0″N 79°25′07″W	48°25′53″N 123°21′15″W	49°13′51″N 123°01′17″W

== Qualification ==
Twenty-three teams qualified for the 2007 FIFA U-20 World Cup. As the host team, Canada received an automatic bid, bringing the total number of teams to twenty-four for the tournament. The final draw for the group stages took place on 3 March 2007 in Liberty Grand Entertainment Complex, Toronto.

Confederation	Qualifying Tournament	Qualifier(s)
AFC (Asia)	2006 AFC Youth Championship	Japan; Jordan^{1} North Korea^{1} South Korea
CAF (Africa)	2007 African Youth Championship	Congo^{1} Gambia^{1} Nigeria; Zambia
CONCACAF (North, Central America & Caribbean)	Host nation	Canada
CONCACAF (North, Central America & Caribbean)	2007 U-20 World Cup CONCACAF qualifying tournament	Costa Rica; Mexico; Panama; United States
CONMEBOL (South America)	2007 South American Youth Championship	Argentina; Brazil; Chile; Uruguay
OFC (Oceania)	2007 OFC U-20 Championship	New Zealand^{1}
UEFA (Europe)	2006 UEFA European Under-19 Football Championship	Austria; Czech Republic; Poland; Portugal; Scotland; Spain

1.Teams that made their debut.

== Match officials ==
Confederation	Referee	Assistants
AFC	Subkhiddin Mohd Salleh (Malaysia)	Thanom Borikut (Thailand); Mu Yuxin (China)
AFC	Ravshan Irmatov (Uzbekistan)	Abdukhamidullo Rasulov (Uzbekistan); Bahadyr Kochkarov (Kyrgyzstan)
CAF	Mohamed Benouza (Algeria)	Amar Talbi (Algeria); Mazari Kerai (Algeria)
CONCACAF	Steven Depiero (Canada)	Héctor Vergara (Canada); Joe Fletcher (Canada)
CONCACAF	Joel Aguilar (El Salvador)	Roberto Giron (Honduras); Daniel Williamson (Panama)
CONCACAF	Germán Arredondo (Mexico)	Héctor Delgadillo (Mexico); Francisco Pérez (Mexico)
CONCACAF	Enrico Wijngaarde (Suriname)	Anthony Garwood (Jamaica); Ricardo Morgan (Jamaica)
CONCACAF	Terry Vaughn (United States)	Chris Strickland (United States); George Gansner (United States)
CONMEBOL	Hernando Buitrago (Colombia)	Abraham González (Colombia); Rafael Rivas (Colombia)
OFC	Peter O'Leary (New Zealand)	Brent Best (New Zealand); Kaloata Chilia (Vanuatu)
UEFA	Howard Webb (England)	Mike Mullarkey (England); Darren Cann (England)
UEFA	Wolfgang Stark (Germany)	Jan-Hendrik Salver (Germany); Volker Wezel (Germany)
UEFA	Viktor Kassai (Hungary)	Gábor Erős (Hungary); Tibor Vámos (Hungary)
UEFA	Alberto Undiano Mallenco (Spain)	Fermín Martínez Ibáñez (Spain); Juan Carlos Yuste Jiménez (Spain)
UEFA	Martin Hansson (Sweden)	Stefan Wittberg (Sweden); Henrik Andrén (Sweden)

== Squads ==
For a list of the squads see 2007 FIFA U-20 World Cup squads

== Group stage ==
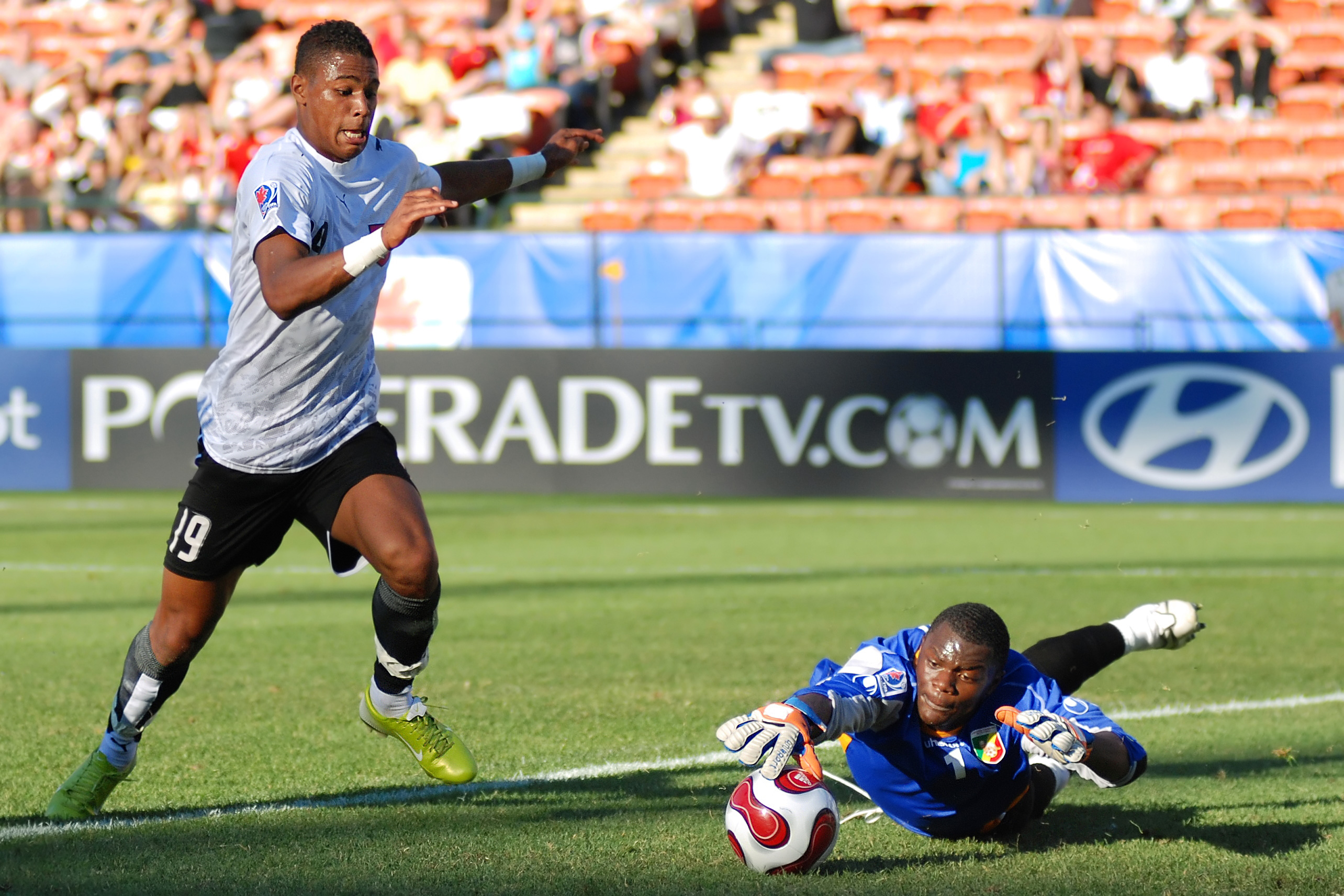
Rubin Okotie of Austria and Destin Onka Malonga of the Congo at the Commonwealth Stadium in Edmonton on 2 July 2007.

The 24 participating teams were distributed between six groups of four teams each, according to a draw held on 3 March 2007. The groups are contested on a league system, where each team plays one time against the other teams in the same group, for a total of six matches per group. Each group winner and runner-up teams, as well as the best four third-placed teams, qualify for the first round of the knockout stage (round of 16).

=== Group A ===
Pos	Team	Pld	W	D	L	GF	GA	GD	Pts	Group stage result
1	Chile	3	2	1	0	6	0	+6	7	Advance to knockout stage
2	Austria	3	1	2	0	2	1	+1	5	Advance to knockout stage
3	Congo	3	1	1	1	3	4	−1	4	Advance to knockout stage
4	Canada (H)	3	0	0	3	0	6	−6	0	

(H) Hosts
1 July 2007
19:45 EDT
23:45 UTC

Canada	0–3	Chile
	Report	Medina 25'; Carmona 54'; Grondona 81'

National Soccer Stadium, Toronto
Attendance: 20,195
Referee: Alberto Undiano Mallenco (Spain)

2 July 2007
17:45 MDT
23:45 UTC

Congo	1–1	Austria
Ibara 59' (pen.)	Report	Hoffer 7'

Commonwealth Stadium, Edmonton
Attendance: 19,899
Referee: Enrico Wijngaarde (Suriname)

5 July 2007
17:45 MDT
23:45 UTC

Austria	1–0	Canada
Okotie 47'	Report

Commonwealth Stadium, Edmonton
Attendance: 31,579
Referee: Hernando Buitrago (Colombia)

5 July 2007
20:30 MDT
02:30 UTC

Chile	3–0	Congo
Sánchez 49'; Medina 75'; Vidal 82'	Report

Commonwealth Stadium, Edmonton
Attendance: 30,352
Referee: Ravshan Irmatov (Uzbekistan)

8 July 2007
18:00 MDT
00:00 UTC

Canada	0–2	Congo
	Report	Ngakosso 26'; Ikouma 60'

Commonwealth Stadium, Edmonton
Attendance: 32,058
Referee: Howard Webb (England)

8 July 2007
20:00 EDT
00:00 UTC

Chile	0–0	Austria
	Report

National Soccer Stadium, Toronto
Attendance: 19,526
Referee: Joel Aguilar (El Salvador)

=== Group B ===
Pos	Team	Pld	W	D	L	GF	GA	GD	Pts	Group stage result
1	Spain	3	2	1	0	8	5	+3	7	Advance to knockout stage
2	Zambia	3	1	1	1	4	3	+1	4	Advance to knockout stage
3	Uruguay	3	1	1	1	3	4	−1	4	Advance to knockout stage
4	Jordan	3	0	1	2	3	6	−3	1	

1 July 2007
14:15 PDT
21:15 UTC

Jordan	1–1	Zambia
Deeb 41'	Report	Tembo 8' (pen.)

Swangard Stadium, Burnaby
Attendance: 10,000
Referee: Terry Vaughn (United States)

1 July 2007
17:00 PDT
00:00 UTC

Spain	2–2	Uruguay
Adrián L. 71'; Capel 90+3'	Report	Cavani 47'; L. Suárez 56'

Swangard Stadium, Burnaby
Attendance: 10,000
Referee: Wolfgang Stark (Germany)

4 July 2007
17:00 PDT
00:00 UTC

Uruguay	1–0	Jordan
Cavani 40'	Report

Swangard Stadium, Burnaby
Attendance: 10,000
Referee: Peter O'Leary (New Zealand)

4 July 2007
19:45 PDT
02:45 UTC

Zambia	1–2	Spain
Njobvu 74'	Report	M. Suárez 30' (pen.); Mata 40'

Swangard Stadium, Burnaby
Attendance: 10,000
Referee: Germán Arredondo (Mexico)

7 July 2007
14:15 PDT
21:15 UTC

Spain	4–2	Jordan
Adrián L. 29', 32', 38'; Marquitos 79'	Report	Omran 48'; Deeb 56'

Swangard Stadium, Burnaby
Attendance: 10,000
Referee: Hernando Buitrago (Colombia)

7 July 2007
14:15 PDT
21:15 UTC

Uruguay	0–2	Zambia
	Report	Mulenga 22' (pen.); Kola 51'

Royal Athletic Park, Victoria
Attendance: 11,500
Referee: Martin Hansson (Sweden)

=== Group C ===
Pos	Team	Pld	W	D	L	GF	GA	GD	Pts	Group stage result
1	Mexico	3	3	0	0	7	2	+5	9	Advance to knockout stage
2	Gambia	3	2	0	1	3	4	−1	6	Advance to knockout stage
3	Portugal	3	1	0	2	4	4	0	3	Advance to knockout stage
4	New Zealand	3	0	0	3	1	5	−4	0	

2 July 2007
14:15 EDT
18:15 UTC

Portugal	2–0	New Zealand
Gama 45', 61' (pen.)	Report

National Soccer Stadium, Toronto
Attendance: 19,526
Referee: Hernando Buitrago (Colombia)

2 July 2007
17:00 EDT
21:00 UTC

Gambia	0–3	Mexico
	Report	Dos Santos 57'; Moreno 67'; J. Hernández 89'

National Soccer Stadium, Toronto
Attendance: 19,526
Referee: Ravshan Irmatov (Uzbekistan)

5 July 2007
17:00 EDT
21:00 UTC

New Zealand	0–1	Gambia
	Report	Jallow 22'

National Soccer Stadium, Toronto
Attendance: 19,526
Referee: Joel Aguilar (El Salvador)

5 July 2007
19:45 EDT
23:45 UTC

Mexico	2–1	Portugal
Dos Santos 48' (pen.); Barrera 66'	Report	Antunes 89'

National Soccer Stadium, Toronto
Attendance: 19,526
Referee: Howard Webb (England)

8 July 2007
17:15 EDT
21:15 UTC

Portugal	1–2	Gambia
Condesso 20'	Report	Jallow 44' (pen.); Mansally 68'

Olympic Stadium, Montreal
Attendance: 28,402
Referee: Wolfgang Stark (Germany)

8 July 2007
15:15 MDT
21:15 UTC

New Zealand	1–2	Mexico
Pelter 89'	Report	Bermúdez 24'; Mares 78'

Commonwealth Stadium, Edmonton
Attendance: 29,792
Referee: Mohamed Benouza (Algeria)

=== Group D ===
Pos	Team	Pld	W	D	L	GF	GA	GD	Pts	Group stage result
1	United States	3	2	1	0	9	3	+6	7	Advance to knockout stage
2	Poland	3	1	1	1	3	7	−4	4	Advance to knockout stage
3	Brazil	3	1	0	2	4	5	−1	3	Advance to knockout stage
4	South Korea	3	0	2	1	4	5	−1	2	

30 June 2007
14:15 EDT
18:15 UTC

Poland	1–0	Brazil
Krychowiak 23'	Report

Olympic Stadium, Montreal
Attendance: 55,800
Referee: Howard Webb (England)

30 June 2007
17:00 EDT
21:00 UTC

South Korea	1–1	United States
Shin Young-rok 38'	Report	Szetela 17'

Olympic Stadium, Montreal
Attendance: 55,800
Referee: Joel Aguilar (El Salvador)

3 July 2007
17:00 EDT
21:00 UTC

United States	6–1	Poland
Szetela 9', 51'; Adu 20', 45+3', 85'; Altidore 70'	Report	Janczyk 5'

Olympic Stadium, Montreal
Attendance: 35,801
Referee: Martin Hansson (Sweden)

3 July 2007
19:45 EDT
23:45 UTC

Brazil	3–2	South Korea
Amaral 35'; Pato 48', 59'	Report	Shim Young-sung 83'; Shin Young-rok 89'

Olympic Stadium, Montreal
Attendance: 35,801
Referee: Viktor Kassai (Hungary)

6 July 2007
19:45 EDT
23:45 UTC

Brazil	1–2	United States
Lima 64'	Report	Altidore 25', 81'

Frank Clair Stadium, Ottawa
Attendance: 26,559
Referee: Alberto Undiano Mallenco (Spain)

6 July 2007
19:45 EDT
23:45 UTC

Poland	1–1	South Korea
Janczyk 45'	Report	Lee Sang-ho 71'

Olympic Stadium, Montreal
Attendance: 34,912
Referee: Enrico Wijngaarde (Suriname)

=== Group E ===
Pos	Team	Pld	W	D	L	GF	GA	GD	Pts	Group stage result
1	Argentina	3	2	1	0	7	0	+7	7	Advance to knockout stage
2	Czech Republic	3	1	2	0	4	3	+1	5	Advance to knockout stage
3	North Korea	3	0	2	1	2	3	−1	2	
4	Panama	3	0	1	2	1	8	−7	1	

30 June 2007
16:30 EDT
20:30 UTC

North Korea	0–0	Panama
	Report

Frank Clair Stadium, Ottawa
Attendance: 26,559
Referee: Mohamed Benouza (Algeria)

30 June 2007
19:15 EDT
23:15 UTC

Argentina	0–0	Czech Republic
	Report

Frank Clair Stadium, Ottawa
Attendance: 26,559
Referee: Martin Hansson (Sweden)

3 July 2007
17:00 EDT
21:00 UTC

Czech Republic	2–2	North Korea
Kalouda 56'; Fenin 66'	Report	Kim Kum-il 12'; Jon Kwang-ik 89' (pen.)

Frank Clair Stadium, Ottawa
Attendance: 22,200
Referee: Alberto Undiano Mallenco (Spain)

3 July 2007
19:45 EDT
23:45 UTC

Panama	0–6	Argentina
	Report	Moralez 20', 27'; Zárate 23'; Agüero 25', 62'; Di María 76'

Frank Clair Stadium, Ottawa
Attendance: 23,500
Referee: Subkhiddin Mohd Salleh (Malaysia)

6 July 2007
17:00 EDT
21:00 UTC

Czech Republic	2–1	Panama
Kalouda 79'; Střeštík 82'	Report	Barahona 84'

Olympic Stadium, Montreal
Attendance: 34,912
Referee: Steven Depiero (Canada)

6 July 2007
17:00 EDT
21:00 UTC

Argentina	1–0	North Korea
Agüero 35'	Report

Frank Clair Stadium, Ottawa
Attendance: 26,559
Referee: Viktor Kassai (Hungary)

=== Group F ===
Pos	Team	Pld	W	D	L	GF	GA	GD	Pts	Group stage result
1	Japan	3	2	1	0	4	1	+3	7	Advance to knockout stage
2	Nigeria	3	2	1	0	3	0	+3	7	Advance to knockout stage
3	Costa Rica	3	1	0	2	2	3	−1	3	
4	Scotland	3	0	0	3	2	7	−5	0	

1 July 2007
14:15 PDT
21:15 UTC

Japan	3–1	Scotland
Morishima 43'; Umesaki 57'; Aoyama 79'	Report	Campbell 82'

Royal Athletic Park, Victoria
Attendance: 11,500
Referee: Germán Arredondo (Mexico)

1 July 2007
17:00 PDT
00:00 UTC

Nigeria	1–0	Costa Rica
Ideye 75'	Report

Royal Athletic Park, Victoria
Attendance: 11,500
Referee: Peter O'Leary (New Zealand)

4 July 2007
17:00 PDT
00:00 UTC

Costa Rica	0–1	Japan
	Report	Tanaka 68'

Royal Athletic Park, Victoria
Attendance: 10,500
Referee: Wolfgang Stark (Germany)

4 July 2007
19:45 PDT
02:45 UTC

Scotland	0–2	Nigeria
	Report	Bala 49', 78'

Royal Athletic Park, Victoria
Attendance: 10,500
Referee: Terry Vaughn (United States)

7 July 2007
17:00 PDT
00:00 UTC

Japan	0–0	Nigeria
	Report

Royal Athletic Park, Victoria
Attendance: 11,500
Referee: Germán Arredondo (Mexico)

7 July 2007
17:00 PDT
00:00 UTC

Scotland	1–2	Costa Rica
Reynolds 18'	Report	Herrera 57'; McDonald 90+2'

Swangard Stadium, Burnaby
Attendance: 10,000
Referee: Subkhiddin Mohd Salleh (Malaysia)

=== Ranking of third-placed teams ===
Pos	Grp	Team	Pld	W	D	L	GF	GA	GD	Pts	Result
1	A	Congo	3	1	1	1	3	4	−1	4	Advance to knockout stage
2	B	Uruguay	3	1	1	1	3	4	−1	4	Advance to knockout stage
3	C	Portugal	3	1	0	2	4	4	0	3	Advance to knockout stage
4	D	Brazil	3	1	0	2	4	5	−1	3	Advance to knockout stage
5	F	Costa Rica	3	1	0	2	2	3	−1	3	
6	E	North Korea	3	0	2	1	2	3	−1	2	

== Knockout stage ==
Round of 16
11 July – Edmonton
Austria	2
Gambia	1
11 July – Toronto
United States (a.e.t.)	2
Uruguay	1
11 July – Burnaby
Spain (a.e.t.)	4
Brazil	2
11 July – Victoria
Japan	2 (3)
Czech Republic (p)	2 (4)
12 July – Edmonton
Chile	1
Portugal	0
12 July – Ottawa
Zambia	1
Nigeria	2
12 July – Toronto
Argentina	3
Poland	1
12 July – Montreal
Mexico	3
Congo	0

Quarter-finals
14 July – Toronto
Austria (a.e.t.)	2
United States	1
14 July – Edmonton
Spain	1 (3)
Czech Republic (p)	1 (4)
15 July – Montreal
Chile (a.e.t.)	4
Nigeria	0
15 July – Ottawa
Argentina	1
Mexico	0

Semi-finals
18 July – Edmonton
Austria	0
Czech Republic	2
19 July – Toronto
Chile	0
Argentina	3

Final
22 July – Toronto
Czech Republic	1
Argentina	2
Third place
22 July – Toronto
Austria	0
Chile	1

=== Round of 16 ===
11 July 2007
17:45 MDT
23:45 UTC

Austria	2–1	Gambia
Prödl 45+1'; Hoffer 81'	Report	P. Gomez 69'

Commonwealth Stadium, Edmonton
Attendance: 18,721
Referee: Mohamed Benouza (Algeria)

11 July 2007
19:45 EDT
23:45 UTC

United States	2–1 (a.e.t.)	Uruguay
Cardaccio 87' (o.g.); Bradley 107'	Report	L. Suárez 73'

National Soccer Stadium, Toronto
Attendance: 19,526
Referee: Ravshan Irmatov (Uzbekistan)

11 July 2007
20:15 PDT
03:15 UTC

Spain	4–2 (a.e.t.)	Brazil
Piqué 43'; J. García 84'; Bueno 102'; Adrián L. 120+1'	Report	Lima 39'; Pato 41'

Swangard Stadium, Burnaby
Attendance: 10,000
Referee: Martin Hansson (Sweden)

11 July 2007
20:15 PDT
03:15 UTC

Japan	2–2 (a.e.t.)	Czech Republic
Makino 22'; Morishima 47' (pen.)	Report	Kúdela 74' (pen.); Mareš 77' (pen.)
Penalties
Yasuda (penalty missed); Aoki (penalty scored); Makino (penalty scored); Morishima (penalty missed); Kashiwagi (penalty scored)	3–4	(penalty scored) Fenin; (penalty scored) Kúdela; (penalty scored) Suchý; (penalty missed) Pekhart; (penalty scored) Okleštěk

Royal Athletic Park, Victoria
Attendance: 11,500
Referee: Hernando Buitrago (Colombia)

12 July 2007
16:45 EDT
20:45 UTC

Zambia	1–2	Nigeria
Kola 33'	Report	Elderson 3'; Akabueze 57'

Frank Clair Stadium, Ottawa
Attendance: 22,531
Referee: Wolfgang Stark (Germany)

12 July 2007
16:45 EDT
20:45 UTC

Argentina	3–1	Poland
Di María 40'; Agüero 46', 86'	Report	Janczyk 33'

National Soccer Stadium, Toronto
Attendance: 19,526
Referee: Joel Aguilar (El Salvador)

12 July 2007
17:45 MDT
23:45 UTC

Chile	1–0	Portugal
Vidal 45'	Report

Commonwealth Stadium, Edmonton
Attendance: 24,687
Referee: Subkhiddin Mohd Salleh (Malaysia)

12 July 2007
19:45 EDT
23:45 UTC

Mexico	3–0	Congo
Dos Santos 23' (pen.); Esparza 85'; Barrera 90+4'	Report

Olympic Stadium, Montreal
Attendance: 40,204
Referee: Viktor Kassai (Hungary)

=== Quarter-finals ===
14 July 2007
14:15 EDT
18:15 UTC

Austria	2–1 (a.e.t.)	United States
Okotie 43'; Hoffer 105'	Report	Altidore 15'

National Soccer Stadium, Toronto
Attendance: 19,526
Referee: Martin Hansson (Sweden)

14 July 2007
17:45 MDT
23:45 UTC

Spain	1–1 (a.e.t.)	Czech Republic
Mata 110'	Report	Kalouda 103'
Penalties
Mata (penalty scored); Adrián G. (penalty scored); Valiente (penalty missed); J. García (penalty scored); Piqué (penalty missed)	3–4	(penalty scored) Fenin; (penalty scored) Suchý; (penalty scored) Kúdela; (penalty scored) Pekhart

Commonwealth Stadium, Edmonton
Attendance: 26,801
Referee: Ravshan Irmatov (Uzbekistan)

15 July 2007
14:15 EDT
18:15 UTC

Chile	4–0 (a.e.t.)	Nigeria
Grondona 96'; Isla 114' (pen.), 117'; Vidangossy 120+2'	Report

Olympic Stadium, Montreal
Attendance: 46,252
Referee: Howard Webb (England)

15 July 2007
19:45 EDT
23:45 UTC

Argentina	1–0	Mexico
Moralez 45'	Report

Frank Clair Stadium, Ottawa
Attendance: 26,559
Referee: Alberto Undiano Mallenco (Spain)

=== Semi-finals ===
18 July 2007
17:45 MDT
23:45 UTC

Austria	0–2	Czech Republic
	Report	Mičola 4'; Fenin 15'

Commonwealth Stadium, Edmonton
Attendance: 28,401
Referee: Howard Webb (England)

19 July 2007
19:45 EDT
23:45 UTC

Chile	0–3	Argentina
	Report	Di María 12'; Yacob 65'; Moralez 90+3'

National Soccer Stadium, Toronto
Attendance: 19,526
Referee: Wolfgang Stark (Germany)

=== Match for third place ===
22 July 2007
12:15 EDT
16:15 UTC

Austria	0–1	Chile
	Report	Martínez 45+1'

National Soccer Stadium, Toronto
Attendance: 19,526
Referee: Martin Hansson (Sweden)

=== Final ===
22 July 2007
15:15 EDT
19:15 UTC

Czech Republic	1–2	Argentina
Fenin 60'	Report	Agüero 62'; Zárate 86'

National Soccer Stadium, Toronto
Attendance: 19,526
Referee: Alberto Undiano Mallenco (Spain)

== Goalscorers ==
With six goals, Sergio Agüero was the top scorer in the tournament. In total, 135 goals were scored by 84 different players, with one of them credited as own goals.

6 goals

- (Argentina) Sergio Agüero

5 goals

- (Spain) Adrián López

4 goals

- (Argentina) Maximiliano Moralez
- (United States) Jozy Altidore

3 goals

- (Argentina) Ángel Di María
- (Austria) Erwin Hoffer
- (Brazil) Alexandre Pato
- (Czech Republic) Martin Fenin
- (Czech Republic) Luboš Kalouda
- (Mexico) Giovani dos Santos
- (Poland) Dawid Janczyk
- (United States) Freddy Adu
- (United States) Danny Szetela

2 goals

- (Argentina) Mauro Zárate
- (Austria) Rubin Okotie
- (Brazil) Leandro Lima
- (Chile) Jaime Grondona
- (Chile) Mauricio Isla
- (Chile) Nicolás Medina
- (Chile) Arturo Vidal
- (The Gambia) Ousman Jallow
- (Japan) Yasuhito Morishima
- (Jordan) Abdallah Deeb
- (Mexico) Pablo Barrera
- (Nigeria) Ezekiel Bala
- (Portugal) Bruno Gama
- (South Korea) Shin Young-rok
- (Spain) Juan Mata
- (Uruguay) Edinson Cavani
- (Uruguay) Luis Suárez
- (Zambia) Rodgers Kola

1 goal

- (Argentina) Claudio Yacob
- (Austria) Sebastian Prödl
- (Brazil) Amaral
- (Chile) Carlos Carmona
- (Chile) Hans Martínez
- (Chile) Alexis Sánchez
- (Chile) Mathías Vidangossy
- (Republic of the Congo) Franchel Ibara
- (Republic of the Congo) Gracia Ikouma
- (Republic of the Congo) Ermejea Ngakosso
- (Costa Rica) Pablo Herrera
- (Costa Rica) Jonathan McDonald
- (Czech Republic) Ondřej Kúdela
- (Czech Republic) Jakub Mareš
- (Czech Republic) Tomáš Mičola
- (Czech Republic) Marek Střeštík
- (The Gambia) Pierre Gomez
- (The Gambia) Abdoulie Mansally
- (Japan) Jun Aoyama
- (Japan) Tomoaki Makino
- (Japan) Atomu Tanaka
- (Japan) Tsukasa Umesaki
- (Jordan) Lo'ay Omran
- (Mexico) Christian Bermúdez
- (Mexico) Omar Esparza
- (Mexico) Javier Hernández
- (Mexico) Héctor Moreno
- (Mexico) Osmar Mares
- (New Zealand) Jack Pelter
- (Nigeria) Chukwuma Akabueze
- (Nigeria) Elderson Echiéjilé
- (Nigeria) Brown Ideye
- (North Korea) Kim Kum-il
- (North Korea) Jon Kwang-ik
- (Panama) Nelson Barahona
- (Poland) Grzegorz Krychowiak
- (Portugal) Vitorino Antunes
- (Portugal) Feliciano Condesso
- (Scotland) Ross Campbell
- (Scotland) Mark Reynolds
- (South Korea) Lee Sang-ho
- (South Korea) Shim Young-sung
- (Spain) Marquitos
- (Spain) Alberto Bueno
- (Spain) Diego Capel
- (Spain) Javi García
- (Spain) Gerard Piqué
- (Spain) Mario Suárez
- (United States) Michael Bradley
- (Zambia) Clifford Mulenga
- (Zambia) William Njobvu
- (Zambia) Fwayo Tembo

1 own goal

- (Uruguay) Mathías Cardaccio (against the United States)

== Awards ==
Golden Ball	Silver Ball	Bronze Ball
(Argentina) Sergio Agüero	(Argentina) Maximiliano Moralez	(Mexico) Giovani dos Santos
Golden Shoe	Silver Shoe	Bronze Shoe
(Argentina) Sergio Agüero	(Spain) Adrián López	(Argentina) Maximiliano Moralez
FIFA Fair Play Award
Japan

== Final ranking ==
Pos	Team	Pld	W	D	L	GF	GA	GD	Pts	Final result
1	Argentina	7	6	1	0	16	2	+14	19	Champions
2	Czech Republic	7	2	4	1	10	8	+2	10	Runners-up
3	Chile	7	5	1	1	12	3	+9	16	Third place
4	Austria	7	3	2	2	6	6	0	11	Fourth place
5	Mexico	5	4	0	1	10	3	+7	12	Eliminated in Quarter-finals
6	Spain	5	3	2	0	13	8	+5	11	Eliminated in Quarter-finals
7	United States	5	3	1	1	12	6	+6	10	Eliminated in Quarter-finals
8	Nigeria	5	3	1	1	5	5	0	10	Eliminated in Quarter-finals
9	Japan	4	2	2	0	6	3	+3	8	Eliminated in Round of 16
10	Gambia	4	2	0	2	4	6	−2	6	Eliminated in Round of 16
11	Zambia	4	1	1	2	5	5	0	4	Eliminated in Round of 16
12	Uruguay	4	1	1	2	4	6	−2	4	Eliminated in Round of 16
13	Congo	4	1	1	2	3	7	−4	4	Eliminated in Round of 16
14	Poland	4	1	1	2	4	10	−6	4	Eliminated in Round of 16
15	Portugal	4	1	0	3	4	5	−1	3	Eliminated in Round of 16
16	Brazil	4	1	0	3	6	9	−3	3	Eliminated in Round of 16
17	Costa Rica	3	1	0	2	2	3	−1	3	Eliminated in Group stage
18	South Korea	3	0	2	1	4	5	−1	2	Eliminated in Group stage
19	North Korea	3	0	2	1	2	3	−1	2	Eliminated in Group stage
20	Jordan	3	0	1	2	3	6	−3	1	Eliminated in Group stage
21	Panama	3	0	1	2	1	8	−7	1	Eliminated in Group stage
22	New Zealand	3	0	0	3	1	5	−4	0	Eliminated in Group stage
23	Scotland	3	0	0	3	2	7	−5	0	Eliminated in Group stage
24	Canada (H)	3	0	0	3	0	6	−6	0	Eliminated in Group stage

Source: rsssf.com
(H) Hosts

== Controversies ==
=== Nigerian accusations of racism ===
The quarter-final match between Chile and Nigeria occurred on FIFA's "Say No To Racism Day." During extra time, Chile's Jaime Grondona scored in the 96th minute, but Nigerian players protested that the goal was offside. Despite their appeals, referee Howard Webb allowed the goal to stand, and goalkeeper Ikechukwu Ezenwa received a yellow card for dissent. Subsequent replays showed a defender was out of position, confirming the goal was valid.

After the match, Nigerian coach Ladan Bosso accused Webb of racism at a press conference, stating, "The officiating, I think FIFA has a long way to go to beat racism because that official showed racism." When asked directly if he believed Webb was racist, Bosso replied, "It's good for FIFA to bring in the fight against racism, but they have to follow it to the letter so that the implementation will be done." The FIFA Disciplinary Committee found Bosso guilty of "offensive behaviour" under Article 57 of the FIFA Disciplinary Code, fining him CHF 11,000 and banning him for four months.

The Nigeria Football Federation (NFF) was also sanctioned for allowing players to wear T-shirts with religious statements under their game jerseys, violating tournament regulations that prohibit "political, religious, commercial, or personal messages" on team kits.

=== Chilean clash with police ===
On 19 July, a clash erupted between Chilean players and police following the semi-final match between Chile and Argentina. The Chilean players were furious with referee Wolfgang Stark, claiming he had "lost control of the match early on" and criticizing his issuance of seven yellow cards, two red cards, and the 53 fouls committed during the game. After the match, Chilean players surrounded Stark and his colleagues, prompting members of the Toronto Police Service to intervene. Fearing an attack from the crowd or players, police escorted Stark off the pitch and into the dressing room tunnel.

A brawl then broke out between several Chilean players, team delegates, and police outside Toronto's National Soccer Stadium. According to Toronto Police Chief Bill Blair, the altercation began when Chilean players scuffled with a rival fan. He added, "Members of the Chilean team then decided to direct some of their aggressive behaviour towards my officers... The job of my officers was to respond in a firm but fair manner to end that violence. They are trained to do so, and that is what they did."

The Chilean players offered a different account, claiming that Isaías Peralta had approached Chilean fans behind a security fence when about ten police officers stopped him. They alleged that a heated argument ensued, during which Peralta, who does not speak English, was verbally and physically abused by the officers. Peralta was tasered by an officer and lost consciousness for 20 minutes. Other players then struggled with the police before retreating to their bus. Eyewitnesses reported that players on the bus threw objects at police through the windows and tried to grab officers from inside the damaged vehicle. Three minutes later, Harold Mayne-Nicholls, president of the Chilean National Association of Professional Football (ANFP), asked the players to board a different bus. As they exited, police detained them and took them back to the stadium.

FIFA spokesman John Schumacher stated that the players were detained "to de-escalate the situation." Ten team members were held for over three hours and released without charges. The following day, FIFA president Sepp Blatter described the incident as "regrettable" and apologized on behalf of FIFA. The ANFP hired a Toronto-based law firm to pursue legal action against the Toronto police.

The incident made front-page headlines in Chile. The Canadian embassy in Santiago received a bomb threat, and protesters gathered outside holding signs that read, "Racist Canada." Chilean President Michelle Bachelet described the incident as "particularly serious because, in our view, the Chilean delegation suffered unjustified aggression" and lodged a formal protest with the Canadian government. In response, Canadian Prime Minister Stephen Harper remarked, "International soccer matches are hotly contested and often become very emotional. As you know, there are processes in Canada by which the authorities review these kinds of incidents, and I don't intend to comment further."

According to Canadian media, a Chilean team member punched a female police officer in the face before Peralta was tasered. An internal review led by Superintendent Jim Ramer concluded that officers acted professionally and with "an immense amount of restraint." The report stated that Chilean players "punched, kicked, spat on, and kicked" police and security staff. It detailed that the violence began when two individuals unrelated to the game confronted each other, and that a Chilean player then punched a female officer. The violence escalated as players dismantled bus seats, smashing windows to throw objects such as D batteries, clothes hangers, and deodorant cans at police, injuring four officers. FIFA agreed to cover the $35,000 cost of damages to the team's rented bus.

Mayne-Nicholls, who witnessed the incident, stated, "I didn't see any Chilean player hitting any officer except between all the struggling." Patricio Bascuñán, president of the Salvador Allende Cultural Society of Toronto, called for an independent review.

Grondona was suspended for nine months from all levels of play, including domestic and international, and fined CHF 7,000 for assaulting match officials. The Chilean football association was fined CHF 15,000 for "team misconduct."

== See also ==
- Canadian Soccer Association
- 2007 FIFA U-17 World Cup
