= 2007 FIFA U-20 World Cup squads =

FIFA championship roster

The clubs referred to are the clubs the players played for at the time of the competition as stated at FIFA.com.

Players marked in bold have been capped at full international level.

== Group A ==
=== Austria ===
Head coach: (Austria) Paul Gludovatz

| No. | Pos. | Player | Date of birth (age) | Caps | Club |
|---|---|---|---|---|---|
| 1 | GK | Bartoloměj Kuru | 3 April 1987 (aged 20) | | Austria Wien |
| 2 | DF | Thomas Panny | 3 February 1987 (aged 20) | | (Austria) Admira Wacker Mödling |
| 3 | DF | Daniel Gramann | 6 January 1987 (aged 20) | | (Austria) TSV Hartberg |
| 4 | DF | **Sebastian Prödl** | 21 June 1987 (aged 20) | | (Austria) Sturm Graz |
| 5 | DF | **Markus Suttner** | 16 April 1987 (aged 20) | | Austria Wien |
| 6 | MF | Michael Stanislaw | 5 June 1987 (aged 20) | | (Austria) SC Schwanenstadt |
| 7 | FW | **Martin Harnik** | 10 June 1987 (aged 20) | | (Germany) Werder Bremen |
| 8 | MF | **Veli Kavlak** | 3 November 1988 (aged 18) | | (Austria) Rapid Wien |
| 9 | FW | **Erwin Hoffer** | 14 April 1987 (aged 20) | | (Austria) Rapid Wien |
| 10 | MF | **Zlatko Junuzović** | 26 September 1987 (aged 19) | | Austria Kärnten |
| 11 | MF | Peter Hackmair | 26 June 1987 (aged 20) | | (Austria) SV Ried |
| 12 | GK | **Andreas Lukse** | 8 November 1987 (aged 19) | | (Austria) Rapid Wien |
| 13 | DF | Thomas Pirker | 17 January 1987 (aged 20) | | Austria Kärnten |
| 14 | MF | Bernhard Morgenthaler | 21 June 1987 (aged 20) | | (Austria) Admira Wacker Mödling |
| 15 | DF | **Michael Madl** | 21 March 1988 (aged 19) | | Austria Wien |
| 16 | FW | Ingo Enzenberger | 27 August 1987 (aged 19) | | (Austria) Red Bull Salzburg |
| 17 | MF | Tomáš Šimkovič | 16 April 1987 (aged 20) | | Austria Wien |
| 18 | MF | Thomas Hinum | 24 July 1987 (aged 19) | | (Austria) SC Schwanenstadt |
| 19 | FW | **Rubin Okotie** | 6 June 1987 (aged 20) | | Austria Wien |
| 20 | MF | Siegfried Rasswalder | 13 May 1987 (aged 20) | | (Austria) DSV Leoben |
| 21 | GK | Michael Zaglmair | 7 December 1987 (aged 19) | | (Austria) LASK Linz |

=== Canada ===
Head coach: (Canada) Dale Mitchell

| No. | Pos. | Player | Date of birth (age) | Caps | Club |
|---|---|---|---|---|---|
| 1 | GK | **Asmir Begović** | 20 June 1987 (aged 20) | | (England) Portsmouth |
| 2 | DF | **Nana Attakora-Gyan** | 27 March 1989 (aged 18) | | (Canada) Toronto FC |
| 3 | DF | Kent O'Connor | 5 March 1987 (aged 20) | | (Germany) 1860 Munich |
| 4 | DF | **David Edgar** | 19 May 1987 (aged 20) | | (England) Newcastle United |
| 5 | DF | **Marcus Haber** | 11 January 1989 (aged 18) | | (Netherlands) Groningen |
| 6 | MF | **Jonathan Beaulieu-Bourgault** | 27 September 1988 (aged 18) | | (Germany) FC St. Pauli |
| 7 | MF | **Jaime Peters** | 4 May 1987 (aged 20) | | (England) Ipswich Town |
| 8 | MF | Keegan Ayre | 4 July 1988 (aged 18) | | (Scotland) Hibernian |
| 9 | FW | Andrea Lombardo | 23 May 1987 (aged 20) | | (Canada) Toronto FC |
| 10 | MF | **Will Johnson** | 21 January 1987 (aged 20) | | (Netherlands) Heerenveen |
| 11 | MF | **Simeon Jackson** | 28 March 1987 (aged 20) | | (England) Rushden & Diamonds |
| 12 | DF | Olivier Lacoste-Lebuis | 28 August 1990 (aged 16) | | (France) Strasbourg |
| 13 | DF | Stephen Lumley | 16 April 1987 (aged 20) | | (Canada) Toronto FC |
| 14 | FW | **Tosaint Ricketts** | 6 August 1987 (aged 19) | | (United States) University of Wisconsin–Green Bay |
| 15 | MF | Cristian Nuñez | 7 July 1988 (aged 18) | | (Canada) Toronto FC |
| 16 | FW | Alex Elliott | 24 April 1987 (aged 20) | | (United States) University of Portland |
| 17 | DF | Gabe Gala | 29 June 1989 (aged 18) | | (Canada) Toronto FC |
| 18 | DF | Kennedy Owusu-Ansah | 20 July 1989 (aged 17) | | (Germany) Hertha BSC |
| 19 | MF | Michael D'Agostino | 7 January 1987 (aged 20) | | (United States) University of Kentucky |
| 20 | GK | **David Monsalve** | 21 December 1988 (aged 18) | | (Canada) Toronto F.C. |
| 21 | GK | Zach Kalthoff | 20 November 1988 (aged 18) | | (Germany) Kaiserslautern B |

=== Chile ===
Head coach: (Chile) José Sulantay

| No. | Pos. | Player | Date of birth (age) | Caps | Club |
|---|---|---|---|---|---|
| 1 | GK | **Cristopher Toselli** | 15 June 1988 (aged 19) | | (Chile) Universidad Católica |
| 2 | DF | Cristián Suárez | 6 February 1987 (aged 20) | | (Chile) San Felipe |
| 3 | DF | **Mauricio Isla** | 12 August 1988 (aged 18) | | (Chile) Universidad Católica |
| 4 | DF | **Eric Godoy** | 26 March 1987 (aged 20) | | (Chile) Santiago Wanderers |
| 5 | DF | Nicolás Larrondo | 4 October 1987 (aged 19) | | Universidad de Chile |
| 6 | MF | **Gary Medel** | 3 August 1987 (aged 19) | | (Chile) Universidad Católica |
| 7 | FW | **Alexis Sánchez** | 19 December 1988 (aged 18) | | (Chile) Colo-Colo |
| 8 | MF | **Dagoberto Currimilla** | 26 December 1987 (aged 19) | | (Chile) Huachipato |
| 9 | FW | Nicolás Medina | 28 March 1987 (aged 20) | | Universidad de Chile |
| 10 | MF | Juan Pablo Arenas | 22 April 1987 (aged 20) | | (Chile) Colo-Colo |
| 11 | FW | Jaime Grondona | 15 April 1987 (aged 20) | | (Chile) Santiago Wanderers |
| 12 | GK | **Nery Veloso** | 2 March 1987 (aged 20) | | (Chile) Huachipato |
| 13 | DF | Christian Sepúlveda | 23 May 1987 (aged 20) | | (Chile) Unión Española |
| 14 | MF | **Arturo Vidal** | 22 May 1987 (aged 20) | | (Chile) Colo-Colo |
| 15 | MF | **Carlos Carmona** | 21 February 1987 (aged 20) | | (Chile) Coquimbo Unido |
| 16 | MF | Gerardo Cortés | 17 May 1988 (aged 19) | | (Chile) Deportes Concepción |
| 17 | DF | **Hans Martínez** | 4 January 1987 (aged 20) | | (Chile) Universidad Católica |
| 18 | FW | **Mathías Vidangossy** | 25 May 1987 (aged 20) | | (Spain) Villarreal |
| 19 | FW | Michael Silva | 12 March 1988 (aged 19) | | (Mexico) Atlante |
| 20 | MF | Isaías Peralta | 21 August 1987 (aged 19) | | (Chile) Unión Española |
| 21 | GK | Ronald Valladares | 7 October 1987 (aged 19) | | (Chile) Arturo Fernández Vial |

=== Congo ===
Head coach: (France) Eddie Hudanski

| No. | Pos. | Player | Date of birth (age) | Caps | Club |
|---|---|---|---|---|---|
| 1 | GK | **Destin Onka Malonga** | 16 March 1988 (aged 19) | | (Republic of the Congo) ACNFF |
| 2 | DF | Yann Kombo | 12 March 1989 (aged 18) | | (Republic of the Congo) ACNFF |
| 3 | DF | Yan Ahoungou | 5 September 1988 (aged 18) | | (Republic of the Congo) ACNFF |
| 4 | DF | Jules Ondjola | 25 August 1988 (aged 18) | | (France) Auxerre |
| 5 | FW | Gracia Ikouma | 24 December 1989 (aged 17) | | (Republic of the Congo) ACNFF |
| 6 | DF | Oxence M'Bani | 5 May 1987 (aged 20) | | (France) Auxerre |
| 7 | MF | Presten Lakolo | 13 April 1989 (aged 18) | | (Republic of the Congo) ACNFF |
| 8 | MF | **Delvin N'Dinga** | 14 March 1988 (aged 19) | | (France) Auxerre |
| 9 | FW | Ermejea Ngakosso | 30 October 1990 (aged 16) | | (Republic of the Congo) ACNFF |
| 10 | MF | **Cecil Filanckembo** | 15 April 1988 (aged 19) | | (France) Auxerre |
| 11 | FW | **Franchel Ibara** | 27 July 1989 (aged 17) | | (Republic of the Congo) Etoile du Congo |
| 12 | FW | **Fabrice Ondama** | 27 February 1988 (aged 19) | | (Republic of the Congo) La Mancha |
| 13 | FW | **Harris Tchilimbou** | 11 November 1988 (aged 18) | | (Republic of the Congo) ACNFF |
| 14 | DF | Jacques Loparimi | 11 July 1988 (aged 18) | | (Republic of the Congo) ACNFF |
| 15 | DF | **Mimille Okiélé** | 17 April 1988 (aged 19) | | (Republic of the Congo) CARA Brazzaville |
| 16 | GK | Rufin Diampamba | 10 October 1988 (aged 18) | | (Republic of the Congo) ACNFF |
| 17 | DF | Murheyn Mereck | 1 September 1988 (aged 18) | | (Republic of the Congo) ACNFF |
| 18 | MF | Saide Nkounga | 20 September 1990 (aged 16) | | (Republic of the Congo) ACNFF |
| 19 | MF | Bovid Itoua | 17 February 1988 (aged 19) | | (Republic of the Congo) ACNFF |
| 20 | FW | **Ulrich Kapolongo** | 31 July 1989 (aged 17) | | (Republic of the Congo) ACNFF |
| 21 | GK | Gildas Toufliana | 6 February 1988 (aged 19) | | (Republic of the Congo) ACNFF |

== Group B ==
=== Jordan ===
Head coach: (Denmark) Jan Poulsen

| No. | Pos. | Player | Date of birth (age) | Caps | Club |
|---|---|---|---|---|---|
| 1 | GK | Hamad Al-Asmar | 13 January 1987 (aged 20) | | (Jordan) Al-Jazeera |
| 2 | DF | Tariq Al-Jummah | 17 April 1987 (aged 20) | | (Jordan) Al-Arabi |
| 3 | DF | **Ibrahim Al-Zawahreh** | 17 January 1989 (aged 18) | | (Jordan) Al-Faisaly |
| 4 | MF | Mohammad Qatawneh | 1 February 1987 (aged 20) | | (Jordan) Al-Faisaly |
| 5 | MF | Khaled Al-Katatsheh | 9 March 1988 (aged 19) | | (Jordan) Al-Faisaly |
| 6 | DF | **Anas Bani Yaseen** | 29 November 1988 (aged 18) | | (Jordan) Al-Arabi |
| 7 | MF | **Baha' Abdel-Rahman** | 5 January 1987 (aged 20) | | (Jordan) Al-Faisaly |
| 8 | FW | **Abdallah Deeb** | 10 March 1987 (aged 20) | | (Jordan) Al-Wahdat |
| 9 | FW | **Mohammad Omar Shishani** | 24 April 1989 (aged 18) | | (Jordan) Al-Ahli |
| 10 | FW | Ahmed Nofal | 2 May 1987 (aged 20) | | (Jordan) Al-Ahli |
| 11 | MF | **Anas Hijah** | 23 June 1987 (aged 20) | | (Jordan) Al-Faisaly |
| 12 | GK | Mohammad Abu-Khousa | 3 December 1987 (aged 19) | | (Jordan) Al-Baqa'a SC |
| 13 | DF | **Mohammad Al-Basha** | 5 February 1988 (aged 19) | | (Jordan) Al-Jazeera |
| 14 | MF | **Ra'ed Al-Nawateer** | 5 May 1988 (aged 19) | | (Jordan) Al-Jazeera |
| 15 | MF | **Adnan Adous** | 26 September 1987 (aged 19) | | (Jordan) Al-Baqa'a SC |
| 16 | DF | **Mohammad Al-Dmeiri** | 30 August 1987 (aged 19) | | (Jordan) Al-Wahdat |
| 17 | FW | **Mohammad Al-Alawneh** | 18 June 1988 (aged 19) | | (Jordan) Al-Hussein |
| 18 | FW | **Abdullah Al-Disi** | 18 July 1987 (aged 19) | | (Jordan) Al-Wahdat |
| 19 | FW | **Lo'ay Omran** | 22 July 1988 (aged 18) | | (Jordan) Al-Jazeera |
| 20 | MF | **Alaa' Al-Shaqran** | 21 April 1987 (aged 20) | | (Jordan) Al Ramtha |
| 21 | GK | Salah Massad | 9 August 1989 (aged 17) | | (Jordan) Al-Yarmouk |

=== Spain ===
Head coach: (Spain) Ginés Meléndez

| No. | Pos. | Player | Date of birth (age) | Caps | Club |
|---|---|---|---|---|---|
| 1 | GK | Antonio Adán | 13 May 1987 (aged 20) | | (Spain) Real Madrid |
| 2 | DF | Antonio Barragán | 12 June 1987 (aged 20) | | (Spain) Deportivo La Coruña |
| 3 | DF | José Ángel Crespo | 9 February 1987 (aged 20) | | (Spain) Sevilla |
| 4 | DF | Marc Valiente | 29 March 1987 (aged 20) | | (Spain) Barcelona |
| 5 | DF | **Gerard Piqué** | 2 February 1987 (aged 20) | | (England) Manchester United |
| 6 | MF | **Mario Suárez** | 24 February 1987 (aged 20) | | (Spain) Real Valladolid |
| 7 | MF | Toni Calvo | 28 March 1987 (aged 20) | | (Spain) Barcelona |
| 8 | MF | **Javi García** | 8 February 1987 (aged 20) | | (Spain) Real Madrid |
| 9 | FW | Alberto Bueno | 20 March 1988 (aged 19) | | (Spain) Real Madrid |
| 10 | MF | Esteban Granero | 2 July 1987 (aged 19) | | (Spain) Real Madrid |
| 11 | MF | **Diego Capel** | 16 February 1988 (aged 19) | | (Spain) Sevilla |
| 12 | DF | Roberto Canella | 7 February 1988 (aged 19) | | (Spain) Sporting Gijón |
| 13 | GK | Ángel Bernabé | 11 August 1987 (aged 19) | | (Spain) Atlético Madrid |
| 14 | MF | Adrián González | 25 May 1988 (aged 19) | | (Spain) Real Madrid |
| 15 | MF | Iriome | 22 June 1987 (aged 20) | | (Spain) Tenerife |
| 16 | FW | **Juan Mata** | 28 April 1988 (aged 19) | | (Spain) Real Madrid |
| 17 | MF | Gorka Elustondo | 18 March 1987 (aged 20) | | (Spain) Real Sociedad |
| 18 | FW | **Adrián López** | 8 January 1988 (aged 19) | | (Spain) Deportivo La Coruña |
| 19 | MF | Marquitos | 21 March 1987 (aged 20) | | (Spain) Villarreal |
| 20 | MF | **Stephen Sunday** | 17 September 1988 (aged 18) | | (Spain) Polideportivo Ejido |
| 21 | GK | Javi Martínez | 27 June 1987 (aged 20) | | (Spain) Albacete |

=== Uruguay ===
Head coach: (Uruguay) Gustavo Ferrín

| No. | Pos. | Player | Date of birth (age) | Caps | Club |
|---|---|---|---|---|---|
| 1 | GK | Mauro Goicoechea | 27 March 1988 (aged 19) | | (Uruguay) Danubio |
| 2 | DF | Mauricio Prieto | 26 September 1987 (aged 19) | | River Plate (Uruguay) |
| 3 | DF | **Martín Cáceres** | 7 April 1987 (aged 20) | | (Uruguay) Defensor Sporting |
| 4 | MF | Alejandro González | 23 March 1988 (aged 19) | | (Uruguay) Peñarol |
| 5 | MF | Marcel Román | 7 February 1988 (aged 19) | | (Uruguay) Danubio |
| 6 | DF | Gary Kagelmacher | 21 April 1988 (aged 19) | | (Uruguay) Danubio |
| 7 | FW | **Mathías Cardaccio** | 2 October 1987 (aged 19) | | (Uruguay) Nacional |
| 8 | MF | **Damián Suárez** | 27 April 1988 (aged 19) | | (Uruguay) Defensor Sporting |
| 9 | FW | **Edinson Cavani** | 14 February 1987 (aged 20) | | (Italy) Palermo |
| 10 | FW | Gerardo Vonder | 28 February 1988 (aged 19) | | (Uruguay) Danubio |
| 11 | MF | Elías Figueroa | 26 January 1988 (aged 19) | | (Uruguay) Liverpool (Montevideo) |
| 12 | GK | Yonatan Irrazábal | 12 February 1988 (aged 19) | | (Uruguay) Defensor Sporting |
| 13 | DF | Juan Manuel Díaz | 28 October 1987 (aged 19) | | (Uruguay) Liverpool (Montevideo) |
| 14 | FW | **Diego Arismendi** | 25 January 1988 (aged 19) | | (Uruguay) Nacional |
| 15 | MF | Enzo Ruiz | 31 August 1988 (aged 18) | | (Uruguay) Peñarol |
| 16 | DF | Bruno Montelongo | 12 September 1987 (aged 19) | | River Plate (Uruguay) |
| 17 | MF | **Juan Surraco** | 14 August 1987 (aged 19) | | (Italy) Udinese |
| 18 | FW | **Luis Suárez** | 24 January 1987 (aged 20) | | (Netherlands) Groningen |
| 19 | MF | Tabaré Viudez | 8 September 1989 (aged 17) | | (Uruguay) Defensor Sporting |
| 20 | MF | **Emiliano Alfaro** | 28 April 1988 (aged 19) | | (Uruguay) Liverpool (Montevideo) |
| 21 | GK | Yai Fontes | 22 April 1988 (aged 19) | | (Uruguay) Montevideo Wanderers |

=== Zambia ===
Head coach: (Zambia) George Lwandamina

| No. | Pos. | Player | Date of birth (age) | Caps | Club |
|---|---|---|---|---|---|
| 1 | GK | **Jacob Banda** | 11 February 1988 (aged 19) | | (Zambia) ZESCO United |
| 2 | MF | Peter Malama | 11 April 1988 (aged 19) | | (Zambia) Nchanga Rangers |
| 3 | DF | Joseph Zimba | 1 August 1988 (aged 18) | | (Zambia) Red Arrows |
| 4 | DF | **Dennis Banda** | 10 December 1988 (aged 18) | | (Zambia) Green Buffaloes |
| 5 | DF | **Nyambe Mulenga** | 27 August 1987 (aged 19) | | (Zambia) Forest Rangers |
| 6 | DF | Richard Chibwe | 6 April 1990 (aged 17) | | (Zambia) National Assembly |
| 7 | MF | Richard Phiri | 28 October 1987 (aged 19) | | (Zambia) Red Arrows |
| 8 | MF | **William Njobvu** | 4 March 1987 (aged 20) | | (Zambia) Lusaka Dynamos |
| 9 | FW | Simon Lupiya | 2 February 1988 (aged 19) | | (Zambia) Red Arrows |
| 10 | MF | **Clifford Mulenga** | 5 August 1987 (aged 19) | | (South Africa) Pretoria University |
| 11 | MF | **Fwayo Tembo** | 17 February 1989 (aged 18) | | (Zambia) Edusport |
| 12 | MF | Sebastian Mwansa | 21 September 1988 (aged 18) | | (Zambia) Green Buffaloes |
| 13 | MF | Musatwe Simutowe | 6 March 1987 (aged 20) | | (Zambia) Zamtel |
| 14 | DF | Goodson Kachinga | 4 April 1988 (aged 19) | | (Zambia) Red Arrows |
| 15 | MF | **Justine Zulu** | 11 August 1989 (aged 17) | | (Zambia) National Assembly |
| 16 | GK | **Danny Munyao** | 11 December 1987 (aged 19) | | (Zambia) Red Arrows |
| 17 | FW | Floyd Phiri | 10 December 1989 (aged 17) | | (Zambia) Nchanga Rangers |
| 18 | FW | **Rodgers Kola** | 4 June 1989 (aged 18) | | (Zambia) Edusport |
| 19 | FW | **Emmanuel Mayuka** | 21 November 1990 (aged 16) | | (Zambia) Kabwe Warriors |
| 20 | MF | **Stoppila Sunzu** | 22 June 1989 (aged 18) | | (Zambia) Konkola Blades |
| 21 | GK | Bob Gift Banda | 9 October 1987 (aged 19) | | (Zambia) Kabwe Warriors |

== Group C ==
=== Gambia ===
Head coach: (The Gambia) Peter Johnson

| No. | Pos. | Player | Date of birth (age) | Caps | Club |
|---|---|---|---|---|---|
| 1 | GK | Joseph Gomez | 25 December 1987 (aged 19) | | (The Gambia) Wallidan |
| 2 | DF | Pierre Gomez | 3 May 1989 (aged 18) | | (The Gambia) Banjul Hawks |
| 3 | DF | Furmus Mendy | 11 July 1987 (aged 19) | | (The Gambia) Gambia Ports Authority |
| 4 | DF | Alagie Ngum | 18 October 1988 (aged 18) | | (The Gambia) Gamtel |
| 5 | DF | Ken Jammeh | 18 November 1987 (aged 19) | | (The Gambia) Gamtel |
| 6 | DF | Mandou Bojang | 18 November 1988 (aged 18) | | (The Gambia) Gambia Ports Authority |
| 7 | FW | Kebba Bah | 11 November 1988 (aged 18) | | (The Gambia) Wallidan |
| 8 | MF | Paul Jatta | 21 February 1991 (aged 16) | | (The Gambia) Banjul Hawks |
| 9 | DF | **Pa Modou Jagne** | 26 December 1989 (aged 17) | | (The Gambia) Gambia Ports Authority |
| 10 | MF | Pa Conateh | 10 October 1987 (aged 19) | | (The Gambia) Real Banjul |
| 11 | MF | **Ebrima Sohna** | 14 December 1988 (aged 18) | | (Norway) Sandefjord |
| 12 | MF | **Kenny Mansally** | 27 January 1989 (aged 18) | | (The Gambia) Real Banjul |
| 13 | FW | **Ousman Jallow** | 21 October 1988 (aged 18) | | (Morocco) Raja Casablanca |
| 14 | MF | **Sainey Nyassi** | 31 January 1989 (aged 18) | | (The Gambia) Gambia Ports Authority |
| 15 | MF | **Tijan Jaiteh** | 31 December 1988 (aged 18) | | (Norway) Brann |
| 16 | GK | Christopher Allen | 19 December 1989 (aged 17) | | (The Gambia) Gamtel |
| 17 | FW | **Sanna Nyassi** | 31 January 1989 (aged 18) | | (The Gambia) Gambia Ports Authority |
| 18 | DF | Abdou Ceesay | 13 December 1989 (aged 17) | | (The Gambia) Bakau United |
| 19 | DF | Ebrima Jatta | 18 February 1987 (aged 20) | | (The Gambia) Banjul Hawks |
| 20 | FW | Modou Ngum | 24 May 1988 (aged 19) | | (The Gambia) Wallidan |
| 21 | GK | Suruwa Bojang | 14 July 1989 (aged 17) | | (The Gambia) Steve Biko |

=== Mexico ===
Head coach: (Mexico) Jesús Ramírez

| No. | Pos. | Player | Date of birth (age) | Caps | Club |
|---|---|---|---|---|---|
| 1 | GK | Alfonso Blanco | 31 July 1987 (aged 19) | | (Mexico) Pachuca |
| 2 | DF | **Patricio Araujo** | 30 January 1988 (aged 19) | | (Mexico) Guadalajara |
| 3 | DF | **Efraín Juárez** | 22 February 1988 (aged 19) | | (Spain) Barcelona |
| 4 | DF | Arturo Ledesma | 25 May 1988 (aged 19) | | (Mexico) Guadalajara |
| 5 | DF | **Héctor Moreno** | 17 January 1988 (aged 19) | | (Mexico) UNAM |
| 6 | DF | **Omar Esparza** | 21 May 1988 (aged 19) | | (Mexico) Guadalajara |
| 7 | MF | **Jorge Hernández** | 22 February 1988 (aged 19) | | (Mexico) Atlas |
| 8 | MF | **Pablo Barrera** | 21 June 1987 (aged 20) | | (Mexico) UNAM |
| 9 | FW | **Carlos Vela** | 1 March 1989 (aged 18) | | (Spain) Salamanca |
| 10 | FW | **Giovani dos Santos** | 11 May 1989 (aged 18) | | (Spain) Barcelona |
| 11 | FW | **Javier Hernández** | 1 June 1988 (aged 19) | | (Mexico) Guadalajara |
| 12 | GK | **Rodolfo Cota** | 3 July 1987 (aged 19) | | (Mexico) Pachuca |
| 13 | DF | **Julio César Domínguez** | 8 November 1987 (aged 19) | | (Mexico) Cruz Azul |
| 14 | DF | Osmar Mares | 17 June 1987 (aged 20) | | (Mexico) Santos Laguna |
| 15 | MF | Juan Carlos Silva | 6 February 1988 (aged 19) | | (Mexico) América |
| 16 | DF | **Adrián Aldrete** | 14 June 1988 (aged 19) | | (Mexico) Morelia |
| 17 | MF | **José Guerrero** | 18 November 1987 (aged 19) | | (Mexico) Atlante |
| 18 | MF | **César Villaluz** | 18 July 1988 (aged 18) | | (Mexico) Cruz Azul |
| 19 | MF | **Christian Bermúdez** | 26 April 1987 (aged 20) | | (Mexico) Atlante |
| 20 | MF | **Alejandro Castro** | 27 March 1987 (aged 20) | | (Mexico) Cruz Azul |
| 21 | GK | Alejandro Gallardo | 16 January 1988 (aged 19) | | (Mexico) Atlas |

=== New Zealand ===
Head coach: (New Zealand) Stu Jacobs

| No. | Pos. | Player | Date of birth (age) | Caps | Club |
|---|---|---|---|---|---|
| 1 | GK | **Jacob Spoonley** | 3 March 1987 (aged 20) | | (New Zealand) East Coast Bays |
| 2 | DF | Sam Peters | 20 July 1989 (aged 17) | | (New Zealand) Team Wellington |
| 3 | DF | **Ian Hogg** | 15 December 1989 (aged 17) | | (New Zealand) Hawke's Bay United |
| 4 | MF | **Cole Peverley** | 2 July 1988 (aged 18) | | (New Zealand) Waikato |
| 5 | DF | Jack Pelter | 30 July 1987 (aged 19) | | (New Zealand) Canterbury United |
| 6 | DF | Phil Edginton | 8 February 1987 (aged 20) | | (New Zealand) Hawke's Bay United |
| 7 | FW | **Craig Henderson** | 24 June 1987 (aged 20) | | (United States) Dartmouth College |
| 8 | FW | **Chris James** | 4 July 1987 (aged 19) | | (England) Fulham |
| 9 | FW | **Greg Draper** | 13 August 1989 (aged 17) | | (New Zealand) Canterbury United |
| 10 | FW | **Jeremy Brockie** | 7 October 1987 (aged 19) | | (New Zealand) Hawke's Bay United |
| 11 | MF | Sam Jenkins | 17 February 1987 (aged 20) | | (New Zealand) Hawke's Bay United |
| 12 | MF | Nick Roydhouse | 5 October 1988 (aged 18) | | (New Zealand) YoungHeart Manawatu |
| 13 | MF | Michael Cunningham | 29 November 1987 (aged 19) | | (New Zealand) Otago United |
| 14 | DF | **Michael Boxall** | 18 August 1988 (aged 18) | | (New Zealand) Auckland City |
| 15 | MF | **Dan Keat** | 28 September 1987 (aged 19) | | (United States) Dartmouth College |
| 16 | GK | Rodney Brown | 24 October 1987 (aged 19) | | (New Zealand) Team Wellington |
| 17 | DF | Tim Schaeffers | 14 May 1987 (aged 20) | | (New Zealand) Waikato |
| 18 | MF | Tim Richardson | 12 September 1988 (aged 18) | | (New Zealand) YoungHeart Manawatu |
| 19 | DF | Kieran Purcell | 27 April 1988 (aged 19) | | (United States) University of Evansville |
| 20 | GK | Rhys Keane | 9 March 1990 (aged 17) | | (Australia) Manly United |
| 21 | MF | **Aaron Clapham** | 15 January 1987 (aged 20) | | (United States) University of Louisville |

=== Portugal ===
Head coach: (Portugal) José Couceiro

| No. | Pos. | Player | Date of birth (age) | Caps | Goals | Club |
|---|---|---|---|---|---|---|
| 1 | GK | Igor Araújo | 4 February 1987 (aged 20) | | | (Portuguese Football Federation) Covilhã |
| 2 | DF | Pedro Correia | 27 March 1987 (aged 20) | | | (Portuguese Football Federation) Benfica |
| 3 | DF | **Steven Vitória** | 11 January 1987 (aged 20) | | | (Portuguese Football Federation) Tourizense |
| 4 | DF | Paulo Renato | 14 May 1987 (aged 20) | | | (Portuguese Football Federation) Real Massamá |
| 5 | DF | André Marques | 1 August 1987 (aged 19) | | | (Portuguese Football Federation) Olivais e Moscavide |
| 6 | MF | Nuno Coelho | 23 November 1987 (aged 19) | | | (Portuguese Football Federation) Portimonense |
| 7 | FW | Bruno Gama | 15 November 1987 (aged 19) | | | (Portuguese Football Federation) Braga |
| 8 | MF | Pelé | 14 September 1987 (aged 19) | | | (Portuguese Football Federation) Vitória de Guimarães |
| 9 | FW | Zequinha | 7 January 1987 (aged 20) | | | (Portuguese Football Federation) Tourizense |
| 10 | MF | Vítor Gomes | 25 December 1987 (aged 19) | | | (Portuguese Football Federation) Rio Ave |
| 11 | DF | **Fábio Coentrão** | 11 March 1988 (aged 19) | | | (Portuguese Football Federation) Rio Ave |
| 12 | GK | **Rui Patrício** | 15 February 1988 (aged 19) | | | (Portuguese Football Federation) Sporting CP |
| 13 | DF | **Vitorino Antunes** | 1 April 1987 (aged 20) | | | (Portuguese Football Federation) Paços de Ferreira |
| 14 | DF | João Pedro | 29 December 1987 (aged 19) | | | (Portuguese Football Federation) Portimonense |
| 15 | MF | Zezinando | 1 January 1987 (aged 20) | | | (Portuguese Football Federation) Estoril |
| 16 | FW | Diogo Tavares | 29 July 1987 (aged 19) | | | (Italian Football Federation) Monza |
| 17 | MF | Feliciano Condesso | 6 April 1987 (aged 20) | | | (Royal Spanish Football Federation) Villarreal |
| 18 | DF | Mano | 9 April 1987 (aged 20) | | | (Portuguese Football Federation) Belenenses |
| 19 | FW | Hélder Guedes | 7 May 1987 (aged 20) | | | (Portuguese Football Federation) Penafiel |
| 20 | MF | Bruno Pereirinha | 2 March 1988 (aged 19) | | | (Portuguese Football Federation) Sporting CP |
| 21 | GK | Ricardo Janota | 10 March 1987 (aged 20) | | | (Portuguese Football Federation) Atlético CP |

== Group D ==
=== Brazil ===
Head coach: (Brazil) Nelson Rodrigues

| No. | Pos. | Player | Date of birth (age) | Caps | Club |
|---|---|---|---|---|---|
| 1 | GK | **Cássio** | 6 June 1987 (aged 20) | | (Brazil) Grêmio |
| 2 | DF | Eduardo Ratinho | 17 September 1987 (aged 19) | | (Brazil) Corinthians |
| 3 | DF | Luizão | 3 January 1987 (aged 20) | | (Brazil) Cruzeiro |
| 4 | DF | **David Luiz** | 22 April 1987 (aged 20) | | (Brazil) Vitória |
| 5 | MF | Roberto | 24 April 1988 (aged 19) | | (Brazil) Atlético Paranaense |
| 6 | DF | **Marcelo** | 12 May 1988 (aged 19) | | (Spain) Real Madrid |
| 7 | MF | **Willian** | 9 August 1988 (aged 18) | | (Brazil) Corinthians |
| 8 | MF | Marcone | 12 September 1987 (aged 19) | | (Brazil) Bahia |
| 9 | FW | **Jô** | 20 March 1987 (aged 20) | | (Russia) CSKA Moscow |
| 10 | MF | **Renato Augusto** | 1 February 1988 (aged 19) | | (Brazil) Flamengo |
| 11 | FW | **Alexandre Pato** | 2 September 1989 (aged 17) | | (Brazil) Internacional |
| 12 | GK | Muriel | 14 February 1987 (aged 20) | | (Brazil) Internacional |
| 13 | DF | Amaral | 5 September 1987 (aged 19) | | (Brazil) Palmeiras |
| 14 | DF | David Braz | 21 May 1987 (aged 20) | | (Brazil) Palmeiras |
| 15 | DF | Edson | 6 July 1987 (aged 19) | | (Brazil) Figueirense |
| 16 | DF | Carlão | 19 July 1987 (aged 19) | | (Brazil) Coritiba |
| 17 | MF | Ji-Paraná | 11 June 1987 (aged 20) | | (Brazil) Internacional |
| 18 | MF | **Carlos Eduardo** | 18 July 1987 (aged 19) | | (Brazil) Grêmio |
| 19 | FW | **Luiz Adriano** | 12 April 1987 (aged 20) | | (Ukraine) Shakhtar Donetsk |
| 20 | MF | Leandro Lima | 19 December 1987 (aged 19) | | (Brazil) São Caetano |
| 21 | GK | Felipe | 10 January 1988 (aged 19) | | (Brazil) Santos |

=== South Korea ===
Head coach: (South Korea) Cho Dong-hyun

| No. | Pos. | Player | Date of birth (age) | Caps | Club |
|---|---|---|---|---|---|
| 1 | GK | Jo Su-huk | 18 March 1987 (aged 20) | | (South Korea) Konkuk University |
| 2 | DF | **Choi Chul-soon** | 8 February 1987 (aged 20) | | (South Korea) Jeonbuk Hyundai Motors |
| 3 | DF | **Shin Kwang-hoon** | 18 March 1987 (aged 20) | | (South Korea) Pohang Steelers |
| 4 | DF | Ahn Ji-ho | 24 April 1987 (aged 20) | | (South Korea) Yonsei University |
| 5 | MF | **Ki Sung-yueng** | 24 January 1989 (aged 18) | | (South Korea) FC Seoul |
| 6 | MF | **Park Hyun-beom** | 7 May 1987 (aged 20) | | (South Korea) Yonsei University |
| 7 | DF | Park Jong-jin | 24 June 1987 (aged 20) | | (Japan) JEF United Chiba |
| 8 | MF | Kim Dong-suk | 26 March 1987 (aged 20) | | (South Korea) FC Seoul |
| 9 | FW | **Lee Sang-ho** | 9 May 1987 (aged 20) | | (South Korea) Ulsan Hyundai |
| 10 | FW | Shim Young-sung | 15 January 1987 (aged 20) | | (South Korea) Jeju United |
| 11 | MF | **Park Joo-ho** | 16 January 1987 (aged 20) | | (South Korea) Soongsil University |
| 12 | GK | Lee Jin-hyung | 6 July 1987 (aged 19) | | (South Korea) Dankook University |
| 13 | FW | Lee Sung-jae | 16 September 1987 (aged 19) | | (South Korea) Pohang Steelers |
| 14 | MF | **Lee Chung-yong** | 2 July 1988 (aged 18) | | (South Korea) FC Seoul |
| 15 | MF | Jung Kyung-ho | 12 January 1987 (aged 20) | | (South Korea) Gyeongnam FC |
| 16 | MF | Lee Hyun-seung | 14 December 1988 (aged 18) | | (South Korea) Jeonbuk Hyundai Motors |
| 17 | MF | **Song Jin-hyung** | 13 August 1987 (aged 19) | | (South Korea) FC Seoul |
| 18 | FW | **Shin Young-rok** | 27 March 1987 (aged 20) | | (South Korea) Suwon Samsung Bluewings |
| 19 | FW | Ha Tae-goon | 12 November 1987 (aged 19) | | (South Korea) Suwon Samsung Bluewings |
| 20 | DF | Bae Seung-jin | 3 November 1987 (aged 19) | | (Japan) Yokohama FC |
| 21 | GK | **Kim Jin-hyeon** | 6 July 1987 (aged 19) | | (South Korea) Dongguk University |

=== Poland ===
Head coach: (Poland) Michał Globisz

| No. | Pos. | Player | Date of birth (age) | Caps | Club |
|---|---|---|---|---|---|
| 1 | GK | **Bartosz Białkowski** | 6 July 1987 (aged 19) | | (England) Southampton |
| 2 | DF | Ben Starosta | 7 January 1987 (aged 20) | | (England) Sheffield United |
| 3 | DF | Jarosław Fojut | 17 October 1987 (aged 19) | | (England) Bolton Wanderers |
| 4 | DF | Krzysztof Król | 6 February 1987 (aged 20) | | (Spain) Real Madrid C |
| 5 | MF | Krzysztof Strugarek | 19 July 1987 (aged 19) | | (Poland) ŁKS Łomża |
| 6 | MF | **Adam Danch** | 15 December 1987 (aged 19) | | (Poland) Górnik Zabrze |
| 7 | DF | Adrian Marek | 12 October 1987 (aged 19) | | (Poland) Zagłębie Sosnowiec |
| 8 | MF | Artur Marciniak | 18 August 1987 (aged 19) | | (Poland) GKS Bełchatów |
| 9 | FW | **Patryk Małecki** | 1 August 1988 (aged 18) | | (Poland) Wisła Kraków |
| 10 | FW | Łukasz Janoszka | 18 March 1987 (aged 20) | | (Poland) Ruch Chorzów |
| 11 | FW | **Dawid Janczyk** | 23 September 1987 (aged 19) | | (Poland) Legia Warszawa |
| 12 | GK | **Przemysław Tytoń** | 4 January 1987 (aged 20) | | (Poland) Górnik Łęczna |
| 13 | DF | Damian Rączka | 5 August 1987 (aged 19) | | (Germany) Borussia Mönchengladbach |
| 14 | DF | Jakub Szałek | 26 May 1987 (aged 20) | | (Poland) KP Police |
| 15 | DF | Maciej Dąbrowski | 20 April 1987 (aged 20) | | (Poland) Victoria Koronowo |
| 16 | MF | **Grzegorz Krychowiak** | 29 January 1990 (aged 17) | | (France) Bordeaux |
| 17 | MF | Jakub Feter | 3 May 1987 (aged 20) | | (Poland) LKS Balucz |
| 18 | MF | Mariusz Sacha | 19 July 1987 (aged 19) | | (Poland) Podbeskidzie Bielsko-Biała |
| 19 | FW | Paweł Adamiec | 30 June 1987 (aged 20) | | (Poland) Zdrój Ciechocinek |
| 20 | MF | Tomasz Cywka | 27 June 1988 (aged 19) | | (England) Wigan Athletic |
| 21 | GK | **Wojciech Szczęsny** | 18 April 1990 (aged 17) | | (England) Arsenal |

=== United States ===
Head coach: (United States) Thomas Rongen

| No. | Pos. | Player | Date of birth (age) | Caps | Club |
|---|---|---|---|---|---|
| 1 | GK | Chris Seitz | 12 March 1987 (aged 20) | | (United States) Real Salt Lake |
| 2 | DF | Tim Ward | 28 February 1987 (aged 20) | | (United States) Columbus Crew |
| 3 | MF | Bryan Arguez | 13 January 1989 (aged 18) | | (United States) D.C. United |
| 4 | DF | Amaechi Igwe | 20 May 1988 (aged 19) | | (United States) New England Revolution |
| 5 | DF | Nathan Sturgis | 6 July 1987 (aged 19) | | (United States) LA Galaxy |
| 6 | MF | **Michael Bradley** | 31 July 1987 (aged 19) | | (Netherlands) Heerenveen |
| 7 | MF | **Danny Szetela** | 7 June 1987 (aged 20) | | (United States) Columbus Crew |
| 8 | MF | **Robbie Rogers** | 12 May 1987 (aged 20) | | (United States) Columbus Crew |
| 9 | FW | Preston Zimmerman | 11 November 1988 (aged 18) | | (Germany) Hamburger SV |
| 10 | MF | **Dax McCarty** | 30 April 1987 (aged 20) | | (United States) FC Dallas |
| 11 | MF | **Freddy Adu** | 2 June 1989 (aged 18) | | (United States) Real Salt Lake |
| 12 | FW | **Jozy Altidore** | 6 November 1989 (aged 17) | | (United States) New York Red Bulls |
| 13 | DF | Ofori Sarkodie | 18 June 1988 (aged 19) | | (United States) Indiana University |
| 14 | DF | **Anthony Wallace** | 26 January 1989 (aged 18) | | (United States) FC Dallas |
| 15 | MF | **Sal Zizzo** | 3 April 1987 (aged 20) | | (United States) UCLA |
| 16 | DF | Julian Valentin | 23 February 1987 (aged 20) | | (United States) Wake Forest |
| 17 | FW | Gabriel Ferrari | 1 September 1988 (aged 18) | | (Italy) Sampdoria |
| 18 | GK | Brian Perk | 21 July 1989 (aged 17) | | (United States) UCLA |
| 19 | MF | **Tony Beltran** | 11 October 1987 (aged 19) | | (United States) UCLA |
| 20 | FW | Andre Akpan | 9 December 1987 (aged 19) | | (United States) Harvard University |
| 21 | GK | Steve Sandbo | 23 February 1987 (aged 20) | | (United States) Ohio Thunder |

== Group E ==
=== Argentina ===
Head coach: (Argentina) Hugo Tocalli

| No. | Pos. | Player | Date of birth (age) | Caps | Club |
|---|---|---|---|---|---|
| 1 | GK | **Sergio Romero** | 22 February 1987 (aged 20) | | (Argentina) Racing Club |
| 2 | DF | **Federico Fazio** | 17 March 1987 (aged 20) | | (Spain) Sevilla |
| 3 | DF | **Emiliano Insúa** | 7 January 1989 (aged 18) | | (England) Liverpool |
| 4 | DF | **Gabriel Mercado** | 18 March 1987 (aged 20) | | (Argentina) Racing Club |
| 5 | MF | **Éver Banega** | 29 June 1988 (aged 19) | | (Argentina) Boca Juniors |
| 6 | DF | Matías Cahais | 24 December 1987 (aged 19) | | (Argentina) Boca Juniors |
| 7 | MF | **Claudio Yacob** | 18 July 1987 (aged 19) | | (Argentina) Racing Club |
| 8 | MF | Matías Sánchez | 18 August 1987 (aged 19) | | (Argentina) Racing Club |
| 9 | FW | Mauro Zárate | 18 March 1987 (aged 20) | | (Argentina) Vélez Sársfield |
| 10 | FW | **Sergio Agüero** | 2 June 1988 (aged 19) | | (Spain) Atlético Madrid |
| 11 | MF | Damián Escudero | 20 April 1987 (aged 20) | | (Argentina) Vélez Sársfield |
| 12 | GK | **Javier García** | 29 January 1987 (aged 20) | | (Argentina) Boca Juniors |
| 13 | DF | Germán Voboril | 5 May 1987 (aged 20) | | (Argentina) San Lorenzo |
| 14 | DF | Leonardo Sigali | 29 May 1987 (aged 20) | | (Argentina) Nueva Chicago |
| 15 | MF | **Ariel Cabral** | 11 September 1987 (aged 19) | | (Argentina) Vélez Sársfield |
| 16 | MF | **Papu Gómez** | 15 February 1988 (aged 19) | | (Argentina) Arsenal de Sarandí |
| 17 | MF | **Maxi Moralez** | 27 February 1987 (aged 20) | | (Argentina) Racing Club |
| 18 | FW | **Ángel Di María** | 14 February 1988 (aged 19) | | (Argentina) Rosario Central |
| 19 | MF | **Pablo Piatti** | 31 March 1989 (aged 18) | | (Argentina) Estudiantes |
| 20 | FW | **Lautaro Acosta** | 14 March 1988 (aged 19) | | (Argentina) Lanús |
| 21 | GK | Bruno Centeno | 8 August 1988 (aged 18) | | (Argentina) San Lorenzo |

=== Czech Republic ===
Head coach: (Czech Republic) Miroslav Soukup

| No. | Pos. | Player | Date of birth (age) | Caps | Club |
|---|---|---|---|---|---|
| 1 | GK | Radek Petr | 15 February 1987 (aged 20) | | (Czech Republic) Baník Ostrava |
| 2 | DF | Jakub Dohnálek | 12 January 1988 (aged 19) | | (Czech Republic) Slovan Liberec |
| 3 | DF | Lukáš Kubáň | 22 June 1987 (aged 20) | | (Czech Republic) Slovácko |
| 4 | DF | **Ondřej Mazuch** | 15 March 1989 (aged 18) | | (Czech Republic) Brno |
| 5 | DF | **Jan Šimůnek** | 20 February 1987 (aged 20) | | (Czech Republic) Sparta Prague |
| 6 | DF | **Ondřej Kúdela** | 26 March 1987 (aged 20) | | (Czech Republic) Slovácko |
| 7 | MF | Jiří Valenta | 14 January 1988 (aged 19) | | (Czech Republic) Jablonec |
| 8 | FW | Michal Held | 27 January 1987 (aged 20) | | (Czech Republic) Slavia Prague |
| 9 | FW | **Martin Fenin** | 16 April 1987 (aged 20) | | (Czech Republic) Teplice |
| 10 | FW | Jakub Mareš | 26 January 1987 (aged 20) | | (Czech Republic) Ústí nad Labem |
| 11 | MF | Tomáš Okleštěk | 21 February 1987 (aged 20) | | (Czech Republic) Brno |
| 12 | FW | **Petr Janda** | 5 January 1987 (aged 20) | | (Czech Republic) Slavia Prague |
| 13 | MF | Tomáš Mičola | 26 September 1988 (aged 18) | | (Czech Republic) Baník Ostrava |
| 14 | MF | **Marcel Gecov** | 1 January 1988 (aged 19) | | (Czech Republic) Kladno |
| 15 | MF | **Marek Střeštík** | 1 February 1987 (aged 20) | | (Czech Republic) Brno |
| 16 | GK | Luděk Frydrych | 3 January 1987 (aged 20) | | (Czech Republic) Hradec Králové |
| 17 | DF | **Marek Suchý** | 29 March 1988 (aged 19) | | (Czech Republic) Slavia Prague |
| 18 | FW | **Tomáš Pekhart** | 26 May 1989 (aged 18) | | (England) Tottenham Hotspur |
| 19 | MF | Luboš Kalouda | 20 May 1987 (aged 20) | | (Czech Republic) Brno |
| 20 | FW | Tomáš Cihlář | 24 June 1987 (aged 20) | | (Czech Republic) Vysočina Jihlava |
| 21 | GK | Tomáš Fryšták | 28 August 1987 (aged 19) | | (Czech Republic) Slovácko |

=== Panama ===
Head coach: (Panama) Julio Dely Valdés

| No. | Pos. | Player | Date of birth (age) | Caps | Club |
|---|---|---|---|---|---|
| 1 | GK | **Luis Mejía** | 16 March 1991 (aged 16) | | (Panama) Tauro |
| 2 | DF | Eric Vázquez | 8 January 1988 (aged 19) | | (Panama) Municipal Chorrillo |
| 3 | MF | **Luis Ovalle** | 7 September 1988 (aged 18) | | (Panama) Sporting '89 |
| 4 | MF | Josue Brown | 11 October 1987 (aged 19) | | (Panama) Atlético Veragüense |
| 5 | DF | Marvin Mitchell | 23 January 1987 (aged 20) | | (Panama) Árabe Unido |
| 6 | MF | Francisco Castañeda | 23 November 1988 (aged 18) | | (Panama) Tauro |
| 7 | MF | Javier González | 20 June 1988 (aged 19) | | (Panama) Alianza |
| 8 | MF | **Luis Jaramillo** | 25 April 1988 (aged 19) | | (Panama) Chepo |
| 9 | FW | **Gabriel Torres** | 31 October 1988 (aged 18) | | (Panama) Chepo |
| 10 | MF | **Nelson Barahona** | 22 November 1987 (aged 19) | | (Panama) Árabe Unido |
| 11 | FW | **Armando Cooper** | 26 November 1987 (aged 19) | | (Panama) Árabe Unido |
| 12 | GK | Guillermo Murillo | 4 November 1987 (aged 19) | | (Panama) Chepo |
| 13 | MF | Pablo González | 21 March 1989 (aged 18) | | (Panama) Sporting '89 |
| 14 | DF | Christian Vergara | 10 December 1988 (aged 18) | | (Panama) Municipal Chorrillo |
| 15 | FW | Javier de la Rosa | 12 January 1990 (aged 17) | | (Panama) Chepo |
| 16 | DF | **Eduardo Dasent** | 12 October 1988 (aged 18) | | (Panama) Tauro |
| 17 | DF | Antonio Leslie | 23 April 1987 (aged 20) | | (Panama) Árabe Unido |
| 18 | MF | **Alberto Quintero** | 18 December 1987 (aged 19) | | (Panama) Municipal Chorrillo |
| 19 | MF | Celso Polo | 19 March 1987 (aged 20) | | (Panama) Chepo |
| 20 | DF | **Carlos Rodríguez** | 12 April 1990 (aged 17) | | (Panama) Chepo |
| 21 | GK | Alexander Andreve | 26 April 1987 (aged 20) | | (Panama) Municipal Chorrillo |

=== North Korea ===
Head coach: (North Korea) Jo Tong-sop

| No. | Pos. | Player | Date of birth (age) | Caps | Club |
|---|---|---|---|---|---|
| 1 | GK | **Ju Kwang-min** | 20 May 1990 (aged 17) | | (North Korea) Kigwancha |
| 2 | DF | **Ri Yong-chol** | 24 February 1991 (aged 16) | | (North Korea) 25 April |
| 3 | DF | **Ri Jun-il** | 24 August 1987 (aged 19) | | (North Korea) Sobaeksu |
| 4 | MF | **Mun Kyong-nam** | 8 April 1989 (aged 18) | | (North Korea) Amrokgang |
| 5 | DF | **Pak Nam-chol** | 3 October 1988 (aged 18) | | (North Korea) Amrokgang |
| 6 | DF | Yun Myong-song | 21 April 1988 (aged 19) | | (North Korea) Rimyongsu |
| 7 | FW | **Kim Kum-il** | 10 October 1987 (aged 19) | | (North Korea) 25 April |
| 8 | MF | **Ri Chol-myong** | 18 February 1988 (aged 19) | | (North Korea) Pyongyang City |
| 9 | MF | **Pak Song-chol** | 24 September 1987 (aged 19) | | (North Korea) Rimyongsu |
| 10 | FW | Kim Chang-hyok | 3 September 1987 (aged 19) | | (North Korea) Pyongyang City |
| 11 | FW | **Ri Hung-ryong** | 22 September 1988 (aged 18) | | (North Korea) Kim Il-Sung University |
| 12 | MF | **Kim Kuk-jin** | 5 January 1989 (aged 18) | | (North Korea) Pyongyang City |
| 13 | MF | Ryom Nam-il | 2 January 1987 (aged 20) | | (North Korea) 25 April |
| 14 | DF | **Jon Kwang-ik** | 5 April 1988 (aged 19) | | (North Korea) Amrokgang |
| 15 | DF | **Yun Yong-il** | 31 July 1988 (aged 18) | | (North Korea) Wolmido |
| 16 | DF | **Ri Kwang-hyok** | 17 August 1987 (aged 19) | | (North Korea) Kyonggongop |
| 17 | FW | **Pak Chol-min** | 10 December 1988 (aged 18) | | (North Korea) Rimyongsu |
| 18 | GK | Ri Phyong-chol | 17 August 1990 (aged 16) | | (North Korea) Kim Il-Sung University |
| 19 | MF | **Kim Kyong-il** | 11 December 1988 (aged 18) | | (North Korea) Rimyongsu |
| 20 | FW | **Jong Chol-min** | 29 October 1988 (aged 18) | | (North Korea) Rimyongsu |
| 21 | GK | **Ri Kwang-il** | 13 April 1988 (aged 19) | | (North Korea) Sobaeksu |

== Group F ==
=== Costa Rica ===
Head coach: (Costa Rica) Geovanni Alfaro

| No. | Pos. | Player | Date of birth (age) | Caps | Club |
|---|---|---|---|---|---|
| 1 | GK | Alfonso Quesada | 15 March 1988 (aged 19) | | (Spain) Cádiz |
| 2 | DF | Brayan Jiménez | 15 March 1988 (aged 19) | | (Costa Rica) Saprissa |
| 3 | DF | Rudy Dawson | 8 May 1988 (aged 19) | | (Costa Rica) Alajuelense |
| 4 | DF | **Giancarlo González** | 8 February 1988 (aged 19) | | (Costa Rica) Alajuelense |
| 5 | MF | Esteban Rodríguez | 1 January 1988 (aged 19) | | (Costa Rica) Alajuelense |
| 6 | MF | **José Miguel Cubero** | 14 February 1987 (aged 20) | | (Costa Rica) Herediano |
| 7 | DF | **Pablo Herrera** | 14 February 1987 (aged 20) | | (Costa Rica) Alajuelense |
| 8 | MF | **Celso Borges** | 27 May 1988 (aged 19) | | (Costa Rica) Saprissa |
| 9 | FW | **César Elizondo** | 10 February 1988 (aged 19) | | (Costa Rica) Saprissa |
| 10 | MF | Luis Pérez | 17 March 1987 (aged 20) | | (Costa Rica) Pérez Zeledón |
| 11 | FW | **Jean Carlos Solórzano** | 8 January 1988 (aged 19) | | (Costa Rica) Alajuelense |
| 12 | FW | **Jonathan McDonald** | 28 October 1987 (aged 19) | | (Costa Rica) Herediano |
| 13 | MF | Marlon Camble | 22 February 1989 (aged 18) | | (Costa Rica) Herediano |
| 14 | FW | **Argenis Fernández** | 3 April 1987 (aged 20) | | (Costa Rica) Santos |
| 15 | MF | Orlando González | 20 January 1988 (aged 19) | | (Costa Rica) Carmelita |
| 16 | DF | Leslie Ramos | 25 January 1988 (aged 19) | | (Costa Rica) Alajuelense |
| 17 | DF | **David Myrie** | 1 June 1988 (aged 19) | | (Spain) Cádiz |
| 18 | GK | **Esteban Alvarado** | 28 April 1989 (aged 18) | | (Costa Rica) Saprissa |
| 19 | MF | Ricardo García | 18 February 1988 (aged 19) | | (Costa Rica) Puntarenas |
| 20 | FW | **Kendall Waston** | 1 January 1988 (aged 19) | | (Costa Rica) Saprissa |
| 21 | GK | Alejandro Gómez | 8 April 1989 (aged 18) | | (Costa Rica) Alajuelense |

=== Japan ===
Head coach: (Japan) Yasushi Yoshida

| No. | Pos. | Player | Date of birth (age) | Caps | Club |
|---|---|---|---|---|---|
| 1 | GK | **Akihiro Hayashi** | 7 May 1987 (aged 20) | | (Japan) Ryutsu Keizai University |
| 2 | DF | **Atsuto Uchida** | 27 March 1988 (aged 19) | | (Japan) Kashima Antlers |
| 3 | DF | **Michihiro Yasuda** | 20 December 1987 (aged 19) | | (Japan) Gamba Osaka |
| 4 | DF | Yohei Fukumoto | 12 April 1987 (aged 20) | | (Japan) Oita Trinita |
| 5 | DF | **Tomoaki Makino** | 11 May 1987 (aged 20) | | (Japan) Sanfrecce Hiroshima |
| 6 | MF | **Masato Morishige** | 21 May 1987 (aged 20) | | (Japan) Oita Trinita |
| 7 | MF | **Tsukasa Umesaki** | 23 February 1987 (aged 20) | | (Japan) Oita Trinita |
| 8 | MF | Atomu Tanaka | 4 October 1987 (aged 19) | | (Japan) Albirex Niigata |
| 9 | FW | Kazuhisa Kawahara | 29 January 1987 (aged 20) | | (Japan) Albirex Niigata |
| 10 | MF | **Yōsuke Kashiwagi** | 15 December 1987 (aged 19) | | (Japan) Sanfrecce Hiroshima |
| 11 | FW | **Mike Havenaar** | 20 May 1987 (aged 20) | | (Japan) Yokohama F. Marinos |
| 12 | FW | Yasuhito Morishima | 18 September 1987 (aged 19) | | (Japan) Cerezo Osaka |
| 13 | DF | Masaki Yanagawa | 1 May 1987 (aged 20) | | (Japan) Vissel Kobe |
| 14 | FW | Kota Aoki | 27 April 1987 (aged 20) | | (Japan) JEF United Ichihara Chiba |
| 15 | MF | Jun Aoyama | 3 January 1988 (aged 19) | | (Japan) Nagoya Grampus Eight |
| 16 | MF | Seiya Fujita | 2 June 1987 (aged 20) | | (Japan) Consadole Sapporo |
| 17 | DF | **Kosuke Ota** | 23 July 1987 (aged 19) | | (Japan) Yokohama FC |
| 18 | GK | Yohei Takeda | 30 June 1987 (aged 20) | | (Japan) Shimizu S-Pulse |
| 19 | MF | Ryuichi Hirashige | 15 June 1988 (aged 19) | | (Japan) Sanfrecce Hiroshima |
| 20 | FW | **Shinji Kagawa** | 17 March 1989 (aged 18) | | (Japan) Cerezo Osaka |
| 21 | GK | Kazushige Kirihata | 30 June 1987 (aged 20) | | (Japan) Kashiwa Reysol |

=== Nigeria ===
Head coach: (Nigeria) Ladan Bosso

| No. | Pos. | Player | Date of birth (age) | Caps | Club |
|---|---|---|---|---|---|
| 1 | GK | Olufemi Thomas | 5 August 1989 (aged 17) | | (Nigeria) Nasarawa United |
| 2 | DF | Sodiq Suraj | 8 January 1988 (aged 19) | | (Nigeria) Prime |
| 3 | DF | **Elderson Echiéjilé** | 20 January 1988 (aged 19) | | (Nigeria) Insurance |
| 4 | DF | **Oladapo Olufemi** | 5 November 1988 (aged 18) | | (Belgium) Anderlecht |
| 5 | DF | Ayodeji Brown | 12 September 1988 (aged 18) | | (Nigeria) Gateway |
| 6 | DF | **Efe Ambrose** | 18 October 1988 (aged 18) | | (Nigeria) Kaduna United |
| 7 | FW | **Bello Musa Kofarmata** | 12 May 1988 (aged 19) | | (Nigeria) Kano Pillars |
| 8 | FW | Ezekiel Bala | 8 April 1987 (aged 20) | | (Norway) Lyn |
| 9 | MF | Nduka Ozokwo | 25 December 1988 (aged 18) | | (Nigeria) Enugu Rangers |
| 10 | MF | Solomon Owello | 25 December 1988 (aged 18) | | (Nigeria) Niger Tornadoes |
| 11 | FW | **Akeem Agbetu** | 10 March 1988 (aged 19) | | (Denmark) Kolding |
| 12 | GK | Moses Ocheje | 21 May 1988 (aged 19) | | (Nigeria) Lobi Stars |
| 13 | MF | Blessing Okardi | 5 November 1988 (aged 18) | | (Nigeria) Ocean Boys |
| 14 | MF | **Chukwuma Akabueze** | 6 May 1989 (aged 18) | | (Nigeria) Kwara United |
| 15 | FW | **Brown Ideye** | 10 October 1988 (aged 18) | | (Nigeria) Ocean Boys |
| 16 | DF | Robert Egbeta | 23 June 1989 (aged 18) | | (Nigeria) Sunshine Stars |
| 17 | DF | **Akeem Latifu** | 16 November 1989 (aged 17) | | (Nigeria) Bussdor United |
| 18 | DF | Nazifi Inuwa | 4 June 1989 (aged 18) | | (Nigeria) Kano Pillars |
| 19 | DF | Kingsley Salami | 27 February 1987 (aged 20) | | (Wales) Cardiff City |
| 20 | MF | Mozes Adams | 21 July 1988 (aged 18) | | (Belgium) Westerlo |
| 21 | GK | **Ikechukwu Ezenwa** | 16 October 1988 (aged 18) | | (Nigeria) Ocean Boys |

=== Scotland ===
Head coach: (Scotland) Archie Gemmill

| No. | Pos. | Player | Date of birth (age) | Caps | Club |
|---|---|---|---|---|---|
| 1 | GK | Andrew McNeil | 19 January 1987 (aged 20) | | (Scotland) Hibernian |
| 2 | DF | Andrew Cave-Brown | 5 August 1988 (aged 18) | | (England) Norwich City |
| 3 | DF | **Lee Wallace** | 21 August 1987 (aged 19) | | (Scotland) Heart of Midlothian |
| 4 | MF | Jamie Adams | 26 August 1987 (aged 19) | | (Scotland) Kilmarnock |
| 5 | DF | Scott Cuthbert | 15 June 1987 (aged 20) | | (Scotland) Celtic |
| 6 | DF | Mark Reynolds | 7 May 1987 (aged 20) | | (Scotland) Motherwell |
| 7 | MF | **Michael McGlinchey** | 7 January 1987 (aged 20) | | (Scotland) Celtic |
| 8 | FW | Calum Elliot | 30 March 1987 (aged 20) | | (Scotland) Heart of Midlothian |
| 9 | FW | **Steven Fletcher** | 26 March 1987 (aged 20) | | (Scotland) Hibernian |
| 10 | FW | **Graham Dorrans** | 5 May 1987 (aged 20) | | (Scotland) Livingston |
| 11 | MF | Ryan Conroy | 28 April 1987 (aged 20) | | (Scotland) Celtic |
| 12 | GK | Scott Fox | 2 April 1987 (aged 20) | | (Scotland) Celtic |
| 13 | DF | Ryan O'Leary | 24 August 1987 (aged 19) | | (Scotland) Kilmarnock |
| 14 | DF | **Andrew Considine** | 1 April 1987 (aged 20) | | (Scotland) Aberdeen |
| 15 | DF | **Garry Kenneth** | 21 June 1987 (aged 20) | | (Scotland) Dundee United |
| 16 | FW | Ross Campbell | 3 July 1987 (aged 19) | | (Scotland) Hibernian |
| 17 | MF | Sean Lynch | 31 January 1987 (aged 20) | | (Scotland) Hibernian |
| 18 | FW | **Robert Snodgrass** | 7 September 1987 (aged 19) | | (Scotland) Livingston |
| 19 | DF | Alan Lowing | 7 January 1988 (aged 19) | | (Scotland) Rangers |
| 20 | MF | Brian Gilmour | 8 May 1987 (aged 20) | | (Scotland) Clyde |
| 21 | GK | Greg Kelly | 28 April 1987 (aged 20) | | (Scotland) Aberdeen |
