= 2007 South American U-20 Championship squads =

Below are the rosters for the 2007 South American Youth Championship tournament in Paraguay.

Players name marked in bold have been capped at full international level.

== Argentina ==
Coach: Hugo Tocalli (Argentina)

#	Name	Pos	DOB	Club
1	**Sergio Romero**	GK	22-07-1987	Racing Club (Argentina)
2	**Federico Fazio**	DF	17-03-1987	Ferro Carril Oeste (Argentina)
3	**Emiliano Insúa**	DF	07-01-1989	Boca Juniors (Argentina)
4	Miguel Ángel Torren	DF	12-08-1988	Newell's Old Boys (Argentina)
5	**Claudio Yacob**	MF	18-07-1987	Racing Club (Argentina)
6	Matías Cahais	DF	24-12-1987	Boca Juniors (Argentina)
7	Matías Sánchez	MF	10-08-1987	Racing Club (Argentina)
8	**Éver Banega**	MF	29-06-1988	Boca Juniors (Argentina)
9	Gonzalo Abán	FW	11-06-1987	Argentinos Juniors (Argentina)
10	**Maximiliano Moralez**	MF	27-02-1987	Racing Club (Argentina)
11	**Pablo Mouche**	FW	11-10-1987	Boca Juniors (Argentina)
12	Bruno Centeno	GK	08-08-1988	San Lorenzo (Argentina)
13	Gonzalo Sebastián García	FW	06-02-1987	Racing Club (Argentina)
14	**Gabriel Mercado**	DF	18-03-1987	Racing Club (Argentina)
15	Leonardo Morales	MF	23-01-1987	Estudiantes (Argentina)
16	**Franco Di Santo**	FW	07-04-1989	Audax Italiano (Chile)
17	**Alejandro Gómez**	MF	15-02-1988	Arsenal de Sarandí (Argentina)
18	Víctor Ismael Sosa	FW	18-01-1987	Independiente (Argentina)
19	**Ángel Di María**	MF	14-02-1988	Rosario Central (Argentina)
20	**Lautaro Acosta**	FW	14-03-1988	Lanús (Argentina)

== Bolivia ==
Coach: Óscar Villegas (Bolivia)

#	Name	Pos	DOB	Club
1	**Carlos Lampe**	GK	17-03-1987	Universitario (Bolivia)
2	Gabriel Aguilar	DF	15-03-1987	Oriente Petrolero (Bolivia)
3	Diego Marcelo Blanco	DF	01-03-1988	Aurora (Bolivia)
4	**Carlos Tordoya**	DF	31-07-1987	Arsenal de Sarandí (Argentina)
5	**Omar Jesús Morales**	DF	18-01-1988	Unión Central (Bolivia)
6	Gonzalo Vaca	MF	06-08-1987	Norte Integrado (Bolivia)
7	**Ricardo Verduguez**	DF	28-07-1989	Blooming (Bolivia)
8	Erland Urgel	MF	17-03-1987	Oriente Petrolero (Bolivia)
9	**Gustavo Pinedo**	FW	18-02-1988	Cádiz CF (Spain)
10	**Jhasmani Campos**	MF	10-05-1988	Oriente Petrolero (Bolivia)
11	Gastón Mealla	FW	03-09-1988	Unión Central (Bolivia)
12	José Feliciano Peñarietta	GK	18-11-1988	Guabirá (Bolivia)
13	**Marvin Bejarano**	DF	06-03-1988	Unión Central (Bolivia)
14	**Eduardo Fierro**	DF	15-08-1987	Blooming (Bolivia)
15	Ariel Juárez	DF	26-03-1988	Bolívar (Bolivia)
16	Diego Vejarano	FW	02-01-1988	Universitario (Bolivia)
17	**Didí Torrico**	MF	18-05-1988	La Paz F.C. (Bolivia)
18	**Ricardo Pedriel**	FW	19-01-1987	Jorge Wilstermann (Bolivia)
19	Jammar Roca	MF	11-05-1988	Vaca Diez (Bolivia)
20	Raúl González	FW	08-04-1988	Blooming (Bolivia)

== Brazil ==
Coach: Nélson Rodrigues

#	Name	Pos	DOB	Club
1	Muriel	GK	14-02-1987	Internacional (Brazil)
2	Amaral	DF	05-09-1987	Palmeiras (Brazil)
3	Anderson	DF	10-03-1987	Fluminense (Brazil)
4	Thiago Heleno	DF	17-09-1988	Cruzeiro (Brazil)
5	Roberto	MF	24-04-1988	Atlético Paranaense (Brazil)
6	**Carlinhos**	DF	23-01-1987	Santos (Brazil)
7	Leandro Lima	MF	19-12-1987	São Caetano (Brazil)
8	**Lucas Leiva**	MF	09-01-1987	Grêmio (Brazil)
9	Fabiano Oliveira	FW	06-03-1987	Flamengo (Brazil)
10	**Willian**	MF	09-08-1988	Corinthians (Brazil)
11	**Alexandre Pato**	FW	02-09-1989	Internacional (Brazil)
12	**Cássio**	GK	06-06-1987	Grêmio (Brazil)
13	**Fagner**	DF	11-06-1989	Corinthians (Brazil)
14	David Braz	DF	21-05-1987	Palmeiras (Brazil)
15	Eliezio	DF	31-03-1987	Cruzeiro (Brazil)
16	**Luiz Adriano**	FW	12-04-1987	Internacional (Brazil)
17	Fernando Reges	MF	25-07-1987	Vila Nova (Brazil)
18	Tchô	MF	21-04-1987	Atlético Mineiro (Brazil)
19	Edgar	FW	03-02-1987	São Paulo (Brazil)
20	Danilinho	FW	11-03-1987	Atlético Mineiro (Brazil)

== Chile ==
Coach: José Sulantay (Chile)

#	Name	Pos	DOB	Club
1	**Christopher Toselli**	GK	15-06-1988	Universidad Católica (Chile)
2	Cristián Suárez	DF	06-02-1987	Unión San Felipe (Chile)
3	**Mauricio Isla**	DF	12-06-1988	Universidad Católica (Chile)
4	Roberto Figueroa	DF	14-02-1987	Coquimbo Unido (Chile)
5	Nicolás Larrondo	DF	04-10-1987	Universidad de Chile
6	**Gary Medel**	MF	03-08-1987	Universidad Católica (Chile)
7	**Alexis Sánchez**	FW	19-12-1988	Colo-Colo (Chile)
8	**Dagoberto Currimilla**	MF	26-12-1987	Huachipato (Chile)
9	Nicolás Medina	FW	28-03-1987	Universidad de Chile
10	Juan Pablo Arenas	MF	22-04-1987	Colo-Colo (Chile)
11	Jaime Grondona	FW	15-04-1987	Santiago Wanderers (Chile)
12	Richard Leyton	GK	25-01-1987	Colo-Colo (Chile)
13	Christian Sepúlveda	DF	23-05-1987	Unión Española (Chile)
14	**Arturo Vidal**	MF	22-05-1987	Colo-Colo (Chile)
15	**Carlos Carmona**	MF	21-02-1987	Coquimbo Unido (Chile)
16	**Jean Paul Pineda**	MF	18-08-1987	Palestino (Chile)
17	**Hans Martínez**	DF	04-01-1987	Universidad Católica (Chile)
18	**Mathías Vidangossy**	FW	25-05-1987	Unión Española (Chile)
19	**Felipe Flores**	FW	09-01-1987	Colo-Colo (Chile)
20	**Eric Godoy**	DF	26-03-1987	Santiago Wanderers (Chile)

== Colombia ==
Coach: Eduardo Lara (Colombia)

#	Name	Pos	DOB	Club
1	**David Ospina**	GK	31-08-1988	Atlético Nacional (Colombia)
2	Andrés Felipe Gallego	DF	26-11-1988	Boca Juniors (Argentina)
3	**Jairo Palomino**	DF	02-08-1988	Envigado (Colombia)
4	**Gilberto García**	MF	27-01-1987	Deportes Tolima (Colombia)
5	Jimmy Bermúdez	DF	16-12-1987	Bucaramanga (Colombia)
6	Alejandro Bernal	MF	03-06-1988	Deportivo Cali (Colombia)
7	**Darwin Quintero**	DF	19-09-1987	Deportes Tolima (Colombia)
8	Jarol Martínez	MF	22-03-1987	Atlético Nacional (Colombia)
9	Sherman Cárdenas	FW	07-08-1989	Bucaramanga (Colombia)
10	**Juan Pablo Pino**	FW	30-03-1987	Independiente Medellín (Colombia)
11	Juan Alejandro Mahecha	MF	22-07-1987	Chicó F.C. (Colombia)
12	Libis Arenas	GK	12-05-1987	Envigado (Colombia)
13	Andrés Felipe Arboleda	MF	13-04-1987	América de Cali (Colombia)
14	Henry Rojas	DF	27-07-1987	Atlético Nacional (Colombia)
15	Javier Reina	MF	04-01-1989	América de Cali (Colombia)
16	Eisner Iván Loboa	DF	17-05-1987	Deportivo Cali (Colombia)
17	Edwin Chalar	FW	21-04-1987	Envigado (Colombia)
18	Gustavo Rojas	DF	06-02-1988	Millonarios (Colombia)
19	Andrés Felipe Ortiz	DF	20-03-1987	Independiente Medellín (Colombia)
20	John Jairo Mosquera	FW	15-01-1988	Wacker Burghausen (Germany)

== Ecuador ==
Coach: Iván Romero (Ecuador)

#	Name	Pos	DOB	Club
1	**Alexander Domínguez**	GK	05-06-1987	LDU Quito (Ecuador)
2	Jorge Antonio Majao	DF	21-01-1988	Manta FC (Ecuador)
3	Diego Rodríguez	DF	24-10-1987	El Nacional (Ecuador)
4	Christian Paúl Balseca	DF	24-07-1987	LDU Quito (Ecuador)
5	Flavio David Caicedo	MF	29-02-1988	El Nacional (Ecuador)
6	Carlos Alberto Castro	DF	07-02-1988	Olmeda (Ecuador)
7	Víctor Estupiñán	FW	05-03-1988	LDU Quito (Ecuador)
8	**Michael Arroyo**	MF	23-04-1987	Emelec (Ecuador)
9	**Felipe Caicedo**	FW	05-09-1988	FC Basel (Switzerland)
10	Miguel Ángel Cortez	MF	21-01-1988	Emelec (Ecuador)
11	**Jaime Ayoví**	FW	21-02-1988	Emelec (Ecuador)
12	Manuel Alberto Mendoza	GK	19-01-1989	LDU Portoviejo (Ecuador)
13	Jefferson Stalin Villacís	FW	03-09-1988	El Nacional (Ecuador)
14	César Moreira	MF	22-07-1987	Manta FC (Ecuador)
15	**Fernando Guerrero**	MF	31-07-1989	Real Madrid (Spain)
16	Gilbert Quiñónez	DF	31-08-1987	Barcelona SC (Ecuador)
17	Carlos Andrés Rodríguez	MF	09-10-1988	Emelec (Ecuador)
18	Mike Rodríguez	MF	20-04-1989	Barcelona SC (Ecuador)
19	Jonathan Troya	DF	01-06-1987	Emelec (Ecuador)
20	Víctor Valarezo	DF	17-05-1988	El Nacional (Ecuador)

== Paraguay ==
Coach: Ernesto Mastrángelo (Argentina)

#	Name	Pos	DOB	Club
1	**Roberto Junior Fernández**	GK	29-03-1988	Cerro Porteño (Paraguay)
2	Gustavo Noguera	DF	07-11-1987	Libertad (Paraguay)
3	**Richard Salinas**	DF	13-07-1987	12 de Octubre (Paraguay)
4	**Pablo César Aguilar**	DF	06-02-1988	Sportivo Luqueño (Paraguay)
5	Juan Romero	MF	13-07-1987	Sportivo Luqueño (Paraguay)
6	Nery Bareiro	DF	03-03-1988	Libertad (Paraguay)
7	**Julián Benítez**	FW	06-06-1987	Guaraní (Paraguay)
8	Luis Enrique Cáceres	MF	16-04-1988	CS Colombia (Paraguay)
9	Carlos Javier Acuña	FW	23-06-1988	Cádiz (Spain)
10	**Marcelo Estigarribia**	MF	21-09-1987	Cerro Porteño (Paraguay)
11	**Pablo Velázquez**	MF	12-03-1987	Libertad (Paraguay)
12	Blas Hermosilla	GK	03-02-1987	Olimpia (Paraguay)
13	Jorge Escobar	FW	05-03-1987	Sportivo Luqueño (Paraguay)
14	Nelson Amarilla	DF	20-07-1987	Guaraní (Paraguay)
15	**Osmar Molinas**	MF	03-05-1987	Olimpia (Paraguay)
16	Jorge González	MF	25-03-1988	Libertad (Paraguay)
17	Ángel Enciso	MF	10-09-1987	12 de Octubre (Paraguay)
18	**Cristian Bogado**	MF	17-01-1987	Nacional (Paraguay)
19	**Edgar Benítez**	FW	08-11-1987	Libertad (Paraguay)
20	**José Montiel**	MF	19-03-1988	Udinese (Italy)

== Peru ==
Coach: José Luis Pavoni

#	Name	Pos	DOB	Club
1	Daniel Reyes	GK	12-12-1987	Alianza Lima (Peru)
2	**Cristian Ramos**	DF	04-11-1988	Sporting Cristal (Peru)
3	Jaime Huerta	DF	08-08-1987	Alianza Lima (Peru)
4	Christian Laura	DF	13-02-1988	Sporting Cristal (Peru)
5	**Kerwin Peixoto**	MF	21-02-1988	Alianza Lima (Peru)
6	**Gianfranco Espejo**	DF	04-03-1988	Sporting Cristal (Peru)
7	José Mesarina	MF	15-11-1988	Alianza Lima (Peru)
8	Nelinho Quina	MF	11-05-1987	Sporting Cristal (Peru)
9	Orlando Allende	FW	09-01-1988	Sporting Cristal (Peru)
10	Carlos Elías	MF	23-03-1988	Alianza Lima (Peru)
11	Juan Quiñónez	FW	14-06-1987	Sport Boys (Peru)
12	Gianfranco Castellanos	GK	08-04-1988	Sporting Cristal (Peru)
13	**Carlos Zambrano**	DF	10-07-1989	Schalke 04 (Germany)
14	Jesús Rey	DF	09-02-1988	Universitario (Peru)
15	Miguel Cárdenas	MF	31-05-1988	Alianza Lima (Peru)
16	Carlos Flores Córdova	FW	09-05-1988	Alianza Lima (Peru)
17	**Damián Ismodes**	MF	10-03-1989	Sporting Cristal (Peru)
18	Jeickson Reyes	FW	09-10-1987	Alianza Lima (Peru)
19	**Josepmir Ballón**	MF	21-03-1988	Academia Deportiva Cantolao (Peru)
20	Enzo Castillo	FW	09-01-1987	Sporting Cristal (Peru)

== Uruguay ==
Coach: Gustavo Ferrín (Uruguay)

#	Name	Pos	DOB	Club
1	Yonatan Irrazábal	GK	12-02-1988	Defensor (Uruguay)
2	Gary Kagelmacher	DF	21-04-1988	Danubio (Uruguay)
3	**Martín Cáceres**	DF	07-04-1987	Villarreal FC (Spain)
4	Martín Díaz	DF	17-03-1988	Defensor (Uruguay)
5	Marcel Román	MF	07-02-1988	Danubio (Uruguay)
6	Alejandro Damian González	DF	23-03-1988	Peñarol (Uruguay)
7	**Mathías Cardaccio**	MF	02-10-1987	Nacional (Uruguay)
8	**Damián Suárez**	MF	27-04-1988	Defensor (Uruguay)
9	**Edinson Cavani**	FW	14-02-1987	Danubio (Uruguay)
10	Gerardo Vonder Putten	MF	28-02-1988	Danubio (Uruguay)
11	Elías Ricardo Figueroa	FW	26-01-1988	Liverpool (Uruguay)
12	Yai Fontes	GK	22-04-1988	Wanderers (Uruguay)
13	Juan Manuel Díaz	DF	28-10-1987	Liverpool (Uruguay)
14	**Diego Arismendi**	MF	25-01-1988	Nacional (Uruguay)
15	Cristian Paz	MF	28-01-1988	Nacional (Uruguay)
16	Maximiliano Lombardi	MF	11-05-1987	Progreso (Uruguay)
17	**Juan Surraco**	FW	14-08-1987	Udinese (Italy)
18	Enzo Scorza	FW	01-03-1988	Danubio (Uruguay)
19	Federico Laens	FW	14-01-1988	Nacional (Uruguay)
20	Leandro Silva	FW	13-03-1987	River Plate (Uruguay)

== Venezuela ==
Coach: Nelson Carrero (Venezuela)

#	Name	Pos	DOB	Club
1	Daniel Tito Rojas	GK	11-10-1987	Estudiantes (Venezuela)
2	**Roberto Rosales**	DF	20-11-1988	Caracas (Venezuela)
3	Jesús Yegüez	DF	16-09-1987	Anzoátegui (Venezuela)
4	**Daniel Benítez**	DF	23-09-1987	Deportivo Táchira (Venezuela)
5	Luis Vargas	MF	08-01-1988	Trujillanos (Venezuela)
6	Frank Peidrahita	MF	15-05-1988	UA Maracaibo (Venezuela)
7	César González	FW	21-06-1990	Mineros de Guayana (Venezuela)
8	**Tomás Rincón**	MF	13-01-1988	UA Maracaibo (Venezuela)
9	Irwin Antón	FW	10-01-1988	Caracas (Venezuela)
10	Guillermo Banquez	MF	24-02-1989	Caracas (Venezuela)
11	**Anderson Arias**	FW	20-04-1987	Deportivo Táchira (Venezuela)
12	Edgar Pérez	GK	30-01-1987	Unión Lara (Venezuela)
13	Francisco Chávez	DF	14-02-1987	Trujillanos (Venezuela)
14	Luiyi Erazo	DF	13-06-1988	Aragua (Venezuela)
15	Wilkinson Rivas	MF	23-01-1987	Caracas (Venezuela)
16	Edgar Eduardo Pico	DF	18-04-1987	UA Maracaibo (Venezuela)
17	**Juan Francisco Guerra**	MF	16-02-1987	[[Florida International University|Florida International University (United States) ]]
18	Luigi García	MF	02-03-1988	Zamora FC (Venezuela)
19	Javier González	DF	26-02-1988	St Francis College (United States)
20	William Francisco	MF	12-04-1987	Caracas (Venezuela)
