= Rączka (surname) =

Rączka is a Polish surname. Notable people with the surname include:

- Damian Rączka (born 1987), Polish footballer
- Mike Raczka (born 1962), American baseball player
