= Anderson Luís (footballer, born 1987) =

Brazilian footballer

Personal information
- Full name: Anderson Luís de Azevedo Rodrigues Marques
- Date of birth: 10 March 1987 (age 39)
- Place of birth: Duque de Caxias, Brazil
- Height: 1.86 m (6 ft 1 in)
- Position: Central defender

Team information
- Current team: Desportivo Brasil

Youth career
- Fluminense

Senior career*
Years	Team	Apps	(Gls)
2006–2008	Fluminense	24	(0)
2009	Ituano	0	(0)
2009–	Desportivo Brasil	0	(0)
2009	→ Avaí (loan)	15	(0)
2010	→ Sertãozinho (loan)	0	(0)
2010–2011	→ Grêmio Barueri/Prudente (loan)	31	(2)
2011	→ Ceará (loan)	5	(0)

International career
2007	Brazil U-20		
- * Club domestic league appearances and goals

Anderson Luís de Azevedo Rodrigues Marques (born 10 March 1987), known by his given names Anderson Luís or just Anderson, is a Brazilian footballer who plays for Desportivo Brasil.

== Biography ==
Born in Duque de Caxias, Anderson Luís started his professional career at Fluminense. He signed a 3-year contract in July 2004. Anderson made his Brazilian Serie A debut on 16 August 2006, replacing Jean in the 76th minute. He then extended his contract and renewed again in August 2008.

In January 2009 he left for Ituano until the end of 2009 Campeonato Paulista. In April, he was signed by Desportivo Brasil, a de facto football investment firm. He was immediately loaned to Avaí.

In February 2010 he briefly played for Sertãozinho (which promoted from Campeonato Paulista Série A2) and left for Grêmio Prudente in 1-year contract in the same month. His loan was extended on 1 January 2011 until the end of 2011 Campeonato Paulista. In May, he was loaned to Ceará.

His contract with Desportivo Brasil also extended in October 2008, which last until 31 December 2012.

=== International career ===
Anderson Luís capped for Brazil national under-20 football team at 2007 South American Youth Championship.
