= Yōsuke Kashiwagi =

Japanese footballer

Yōsuke Kashiwagi 柏木 陽介
Personal information
- Full name: Yōsuke Kashiwagi
- Date of birth: 15 December 1987 (age 38)
- Place of birth: Kobe, Hyogo, Japan
- Height: 1.76 m (5 ft 9 in)
- Position: Central midfielder

Youth career
- 2003–2005: Sanfrecce Hiroshima

Senior career*
Years	Team	Apps	(Gls)
2006–2009	Sanfrecce Hiroshima	112	(18)
2010–2021	Urawa Red Diamonds	311	(42)
2021–2023	FC Gifu	61	(1)

International career
2005–2007	Japan U20	12	(3)
2007	Japan U22	6	(0)
2010–2016	Japan	11	(0)
Medal record
Sanfrecce Hiroshima
Runner-up	Emperor's Cup	2007
Urawa Reds
Winner	AFC Champions League	2017
Runner-up	J1 League	2014
Runner-up	J1 League	2016
Winner	J.League Cup	2016
Runner-up	J.League Cup	2011
Runner-up	J.League Cup	2013
Winner	Emperor's Cup	2018
Runner-up	Emperor's Cup	2015
Representing Japan
AFC Asian Cup
Gold medal – first place	2011 Qatar
AFC U-19 Championship
Silver medal – second place	2006 India
- * Club domestic league appearances and goals

Yōsuke Kashiwagi (柏木 陽介, Kashiwagi Yōsuke; born 15 December 1987) is a Japanese former footballer who played as a central midfielder.

== Club career ==
He played for Sanfrecce Hiroshima and Urawa Red Diamonds before moving to Gifu. He won the 2017 AFC Champions League with the Reds. In 2023 announced his retired for the end of 2023 J3 League.

== National team career ==
In July 2007, Kashiwagi played for the Japan national U-20 team in the 2007 U-20 World Cup. At this tournament, he wore the number 10 shirt and played all 4 matches as the starting offensive midfielder.

In January 2010, Kashiwagi was called up to the Japan national team for the 2011 Asian Cup qualifiers. He debuted against Yemen on 6 January 2011.

== Club statistics ==
As of 20 February 2019

Club	Season	League		Emperor's Cup		J. League Cup		ACL		Other^{1}		Total	
Club	Season	Apps	Goals	Apps	Goals	Apps	Goals	Apps	Goals	Apps	Goals	Apps	Goals
Sanfrecce Hiroshima	2005	0	0	0	0	1	0	-		-		1	0
Sanfrecce Hiroshima	2006	17	1	1	0	1	0	-		-		19	1
Sanfrecce Hiroshima	2007	31	5	4	1	7	0	-		2	0	44	6
Sanfrecce Hiroshima	2008	31	4	4	0	-		-		-		35	4
Sanfrecce Hiroshima	2009	33	8	2	1	5	3	-		-		40	12
Sanfrecce Hiroshima	Total	112	18	11	2	14	3	-		2	0	139	23
Urawa Red; Diamonds	2010	34	4	3	0	6	0	-		-		43	4
Urawa Red; Diamonds	2011	31	5	2	1	6	1	-		-		39	7
Urawa Red; Diamonds	2012	30	6	3	0	6	1	-		-		39	7
Urawa Red; Diamonds	2013	34	8	0	0	5	0	6	1	–		45	9
Urawa Red; Diamonds	2014	33	3	2	0	8	1	–		–		43	4
Urawa Red; Diamonds	2015	34	5	2	0	2	0	5	0	2	0	45	5
Urawa Red; Diamonds	2016	35	5	1	0	1	0	7	0	2	0	46	5
Urawa Red; Diamonds	2017	27	5	0	0	0	0	10	1	1	0	28	6
Urawa Red; Diamonds	2018	30	0	6	0	2	0	-		-		38	0
Urawa Red; Diamonds	Total	288	41	19	1	36	3	82	2	5	0	366	47
Career total		400	59	30	3	50	6	28	2	7	0	478	70

^{1}Includes J. League promotion/relegation Series, J. League Championship and Japanese Super Cup.

== National team statistics ==
As of 2 September 2011

National team	Year	Apps	Goals
Japan U20
Japan U20	2005	2	0
Japan U20	2006	6	3
Japan U20	2007	4	0
Japan U20	Total	12	3
Japan U22
Japan U22	2007	6	0
Japan U22	Total	6	0
Japan
Japan	2010	1	0
Japan	2011	2	0
Japan	2012	1	0
Japan	2013	0	0
Japan	2014	0	0
Japan	2015	3	0
Japan	2016	4	0
Japan	Total	11	0

International appearances and goals
No.	Date	Venue	Opponent	Result	Goal	Competition
2005
	23 November	KKWing Stadium, Kumamoto, Japan	Chinese Taipei U18	5–0	0	2006 AFC Youth Championship qualification / Japan U18
	27 November	KKWing Stadium, Kumamoto, Japan	North Korea U18	1–0	0	2006 AFC Youth Championship qualification / Japan U18
2006
	29 October	Sree Kanteerava Stadium, Bangalore, India	North Korea U19	2–0	1	2006 AFC Youth Championship / Japan U19
	31 October	Sree Kanteerava Stadium, Bangalore, India	Tajikistan U19	4–0	1	2006 AFC Youth Championship / Japan U19
	2 November	Sree Kanteerava Stadium, Bangalore, India	Iran U19	1–2	0	2006 AFC Youth Championship / Japan U19
	6 November	Sree Kanteerava Stadium, Bangalore, India	Saudi Arabia U19	2–1	0	2006 AFC Youth Championship / Japan U19
	9 November	Salt Lake Stadium, Kolkata, India	South Korea U19	2–2	0	2006 AFC Youth Championship / Japan U19
	12 November	Salt Lake Stadium, Kolkata, India	North Korea U19	1–1	1	2006 AFC Youth Championship / Japan U19
2007
	1 July	Royal Athletic Park, Victoria, Canada	Scotland U20	3–1	0	2007 FIFA U-20 World Cup / Japan U20
	4 July	Royal Athletic Park, Victoria, Canada	Costa Rica U20	1–0	0	2007 FIFA U-20 World Cup / Japan U20
	7 July	Royal Athletic Park, Victoria, Canada	Nigeria U20	0–0	0	2007 FIFA U-20 World Cup / Japan U20
	11 July	Royal Athletic Park, Victoria, Canada	Czech Republic U20	2–2	0	2007 FIFA U-20 World Cup / Japan U20
	22 August	National Olympic Stadium, Tokyo, Japan	Vietnam U22	1–0	0	2008 Summer Olympics qualification / Japan U22
	8 September	Prince Mohamed bin Fahd Stadium, Dammam, Saudi Arabia	Saudi Arabia U22	0–0	0	2008 Summer Olympics qualification / Japan U22
	12 September	National Olympic Stadium, Tokyo, Japan	Qatar U22	1–0	0	2008 Summer Olympics qualification / Japan U22
	17 October	Jassim Bin Hamad Stadium, Doha, Qatar	Qatar U22	1–2	0	2008 Summer Olympics qualification / Japan U22
	17 November	Mỹ Đình National Stadium, Hanoi, Vietnam	Vietnam U22	4–0	0	2008 Summer Olympics qualification / Japan U22
	21 November	National Olympic Stadium, Tokyo, Japan	Saudi Arabia U22	0–0	0	2008 Summer Olympics qualification / Japan U22
2010
1.	6 January	Ali Muhesen Stadium, Sana'a, Yemen	Yemen	3–2	0	2011 AFC Asian Cup qualification
2011
2.	17 January	Ahmed bin Ali Stadium, Al Rayyan, Saudi Arabia	Saudi Arabia	5–0	0	2011 AFC Asian Cup
	29 March	Nagai Stadium, Osaka, Japan	(Japan) Selection of J. League	2–1	0	Tōhoku earthquake Charity Match
3.	2 September	Saitama Stadium 2002, Saitama, Japan	North Korea	1–0	0	2014 FIFA World Cup qualification

== Honours ==
Sanfrecce Hiroshima

- J.League Division 2: 2008

Urawa Red Diamonds

- J. League Cup: 2016
- Emperor's Cup: 2018
- AFC Champions League: 2017

Japan

- AFC Asian Cup: 2011

Individual

- J.League Best XI: 2016
- AFC Champions League Best Player: 2017

== Personal life ==
In March 2016, Kashiwagi announced that he had married Nagisa Sato, a TBS announcer. He is not related to former AKB48 member Yuki Kashiwagi.
