= Juan Quiñónez =

Peruvian footballer (born 1987)

Personal information
- Full name: Juan Luis Quiñonez Lopez
- Date of birth: 14 June 1987 (age 39)
- Place of birth: Lima, Peru
- Height: 1.79 m (5 ft 10 in)
- Position: Forward

Team information
- Current team: FBC Melgar
- Number: 9

Youth career
- Sporting Cristal

Senior career*
Years	Team	Apps	(Gls)
2005	Sporting Cristal		
2006–2007	Universidad San Marcos		
2007–2008	Sport Boys		
2008–2009	Sporting Cristal	15	(0)
2010–	José Gálvez FBC	17	(1)
2011–	FBC Melgar	1	(0)
- * Club domestic league appearances and goals as of 25 November 2011

Juan Luis Quiñonez Lopez (born 14 May 1987 in Lima) is a Peruvian footballer who plays as a forward. He currently plays for FBC Melgar in the Peruvian First Division.

== Career ==
Juan Quiñónez started his career playing in the youth divisions of Sporting Cristal. In 2005, he debuted with the first team. In 2006, he transferred to Universidad San Marcos in the 2nd division, playing with them until the first half of 2007. He later transferred to Sport Boys staying until 2008. In 2009, he transferred to his current club Sporting Cristal.

Quiñónez was part of the U-20 Peru squad that played in the 2007 South American Youth Championship.
