= 2007 South American U-20 Championship =

2007 Sudamericano Sub-20

Tournament details
- Host country: Paraguay
- Dates: 7–28 January
- Teams: 10 (from 1 confederation)
- Venue: 4 (in 4 host cities)

Final positions
- Champions: Brazil (9th title)
- Runners-up: Argentina
- Third place: Uruguay
- Fourth place: Chile

Tournament statistics
- Matches played: 35
- Goals scored: 101 (2.89 per match)
- Top scorer: (Uruguay) Edinson Cavani (7 goals)

The 2007 South American Youth Championship (Sudamericano Sub-20) was the 23rd edition of the competition. It was played in Paraguay between 7 and 28 January 2007, and was contested by all ten U-20 national football teams of CONMEBOL. This was the fourth time Paraguay hosted the competition. Brazil finished undefeated and won their ninth title, beating rivals Argentina in the final.

== Format ==
The teams are separated in two groups of five, and each team plays four matches in a pure round-robin stage. The three top competitors advance to a single final group of six, wherein each team plays five matches. The top four teams in the final group qualify to the 2007 FIFA U-20 World Cup, while the top two also qualify for the 2008 Olympic tournament (U-23).

== Squads ==
For a list of all the squads in the final tournament, see 2007 South American Youth Championship squads.

The following teams entered the tournament:

- Argentina
- Bolivia
- Brazil
- Chile
- Colombia
- Ecuador
- Peru
- Paraguay (host)
- Uruguay
- Venezuela

== First group stage ==
=== Group A ===
Team	Pld	W	D	L	GF	GA	GD	Pts
Brazil	4	3	1	0	10	4	+6	10
Paraguay	4	2	2	0	3	1	+2	8
Chile	4	2	0	2	10	7	+3	6
Bolivia	4	1	1	2	4	8	–4	4
Peru	4	0	0	4	4	11	–7	0

7 January 2007
19:50

Brazil	4–2	Chile
Lima 46', 65'; Pato 71', 76'	Report	Isla 18'; Sánchez 73'

Monumental Río Parapití, Pedro Juan Caballero
Attendance: 3,000
Referee: Sergio Pezzotta (Argentina)
7 January 2007
22:00

Paraguay	0–0	Bolivia
	Report

Monumental Río Parapití, Pedro Juan Caballero
Attendance: 3,000
Referee: Albert Duarte (Colombia)

9 January 2007
19:50

Chile	0–1	Paraguay
	Report	Bogado 15'

Monumental Río Parapití, Pedro Juan Caballero
Attendance: 3,000
Referee: Roberto Silvera (Uruguay)
9 January 2007
22:00

Peru	1–2	Brazil
Ísmodes 33'	Report	Lucas 9', 90'

Monumental Río Parapití, Pedro Juan Caballero
Attendance: 3,000
Referee: Samuel Haro (Ecuador)

11 January 2007
19:50

Bolivia	0–4	Chile
	Report	Larrondo 15', 32'; Vidangossy 40', 66'

Monumental Río Parapití, Pedro Juan Caballero
Attendance: 3,000
Referee: Manuel Andarcia (Venezuela)
11 January 2007
22:00

Peru	0–1	Paraguay
	Report	Huerta 37' (o.g.)

Monumental Río Parapití, Pedro Juan Caballero
Attendance: 3,000
Referee: Sergio Pezzotta (Argentina)

13 January 2007
19:50

Chile	4–2	Peru
Medina 9', 70' (pen.); Vidal 64', 79'	Report	Elías 34'; Larrondo 86' (o.g.)

Monumental Río Parapití, Pedro Juan Caballero
Attendance: 3,000
Referee: Albert Duarte (Colombia)
13 January 2007
22:00

Brazil	3–0	Bolivia
Luiz Adriano 34'; Tchô 70'; Pato 86'	Report

Monumental Río Parapití, Pedro Juan Caballero
Attendance: 3,000
Referee: Samuel Haro (Ecuador)

15 January 2007
19:50

Bolivia	4–1	Peru
Pinedo 34'; Campos 75' (pen.), 76' (pen.); Fierro 78'	Report	Quiñónez 18'

Monumental Río Parapití, Pedro Juan Caballero
Attendance: 3,000
Referee: Manuel Andarcia (Venezuela)
15 January 2007
22:00

Paraguay	1–1	Brazil
Benítez 64'	Report	Tchô 87'

Monumental Río Parapití, Pedro Juan Caballero
Attendance: 3,000
Referee: Roberto Silvera (Uruguay)

=== Group B ===
Team	Pld	W	D	L	GF	GA	GD	Pts
Colombia	4	3	0	1	5	3	+2	9
Uruguay	4	2	1	1	6	5	+1	7
Argentina	4	1	2	1	11	6	+5	5
Ecuador	4	1	1	2	5	5	0	4
Venezuela	4	1	0	3	3	11	–8	3

8 January 2007
19:50

Uruguay	0–1	Venezuela
		Antón 10'

Estadio Antonio Oddone Sarubbi, Ciudad del Este
Referee: Víctor Hugo Rivera (Peru)
8 January 2007
22:00

Argentina	1–1	Ecuador
Abán 56'		Rodríguez 73'

Estadio Antonio Oddone Sarubbi, Ciudad del Este
Referee: Ricardo Grance (Paraguay)

10 January 2007
19:50

Uruguay	2–1	Ecuador
Cavani 49'; Figueroa 61'		Moreira 80'

Estadio Antonio Oddone Sarubbi, Ciudad del Este
Referee: Enrique Osses (Chile)
10 January 2007
22:00

Argentina	1–2	Colombia
Fazio 10'		Mosquera 71'; Quintero 77'

Estadio Antonio Oddone Sarubbi, Ciudad del Este
Referee: Leonardo Gaciba (Brazil)

12 January 2007
19:50

Venezuela	1–3	Ecuador
Antón 85'		Moreira 55'; Arroyo 73' (pen.); Ayoví 84'

Estadio Antonio Oddone Sarubbi, Ciudad del Este
Referee: Iván Gamboa (Bolivia)
12 January 2007
22:00

Uruguay	1–0	Colombia
Cavani 54'

Estadio Antonio Oddone Sarubbi, Ciudad del Este
Referee: Ricardo Grance (Paraguay)

14 January 2007
19:50

Colombia	1–0	Ecuador
Pino 63'

Estadio Antonio Oddone Sarubbi, Ciudad del Este
Referee: Víctor Hugo Rivera (Peru)
14 January 2007
22:00

Argentina	6–0	Venezuela
Mouche 11', 27', 62'; Moralez 43'; Sosa 86'; Di Santo 90'

Estadio Antonio Oddone Sarubbi, Ciudad del Este
Referee: Enrique Osses (Chile)

16 January 2007
19:50

Colombia	2–1	Venezuela
Cárdenas 52'; Palomino 61'		Piedrahita 27'

Estadio Antonio Oddone Sarubbi, Ciudad del Este
Referee: Iván Gamboa (Bolivia)
16 January 2007
22:00

Argentina	3–3	Uruguay
Di María 27', 42'; Sosa 45+1'		Cavani 6', 60' (pen.); Laens 77'

Estadio Antonio Oddone Sarubbi, Ciudad del Este
Referee: Leonardo Gaciba (Brazil)

== Final group ==
Team	Pts	Pld	W	D	L	GF	GA	Dif
Brazil	11	5	3	2	0	10	5	+5
Argentina	9	5	2	3	0	4	2	+2
Uruguay	7	5	2	1	2	7	6	+1
Chile	6	5	1	3	1	10	6	+4
Paraguay	6	5	2	0	3	7	9	-2
Colombia	1	5	0	1	4	2	12	-10

=== Fixtures ===
19 January 2007

Paraguay	1–3	Uruguay
Bogado 64' (pen.)		Kagelmacher 3'; Vonder Putten 14'; Cavani 26'

Defensores del Chaco, Asunción
Referee: Leonardo Gaciba (Brazil)
19 January 2007

Colombia	0–5	Chile
		Vidal 36'; Medina 53', 60'; Larrondo 72'; Arenas 84'

Defensores del Chaco, Asunción
Referee: Ricardo Grance (Paraguay)
19 January 2007

Brazil	2–2	Argentina
Luiz Adriano 28'; Lucas 60'		Sosa 47'; Cahais 58'

Defensores del Chaco, Asunción
Referee: Roberto Silvera (Uruguay)

21 January 2007

Paraguay	0–1	Argentina
		Cahais 33'

Estadio Feliciano Cáceres, Luque
Referee: Víctor Hugo Rivera (Peru)
21 January 2007

Brazil	2–2	Chile
Pato 69'; Tchô 85'		Vidal 84', 90+4'

Estadio Feliciano Cáceres, Luque
Referee: Alberte Duarte (Colombia)
21 January 2007

Colombia	0–2	Uruguay
		Figueroa 56'; Cavani 90+3'

Estadio Feliciano Cáceres, Luque
Referee: Sergio Pezzotta (Argentina)

23 January 2007

Argentina	0–0	Chile

Defensores del Chaco, Asunción
Referee: Ricardo Grance (Paraguay)
23 January 2007

Colombia	2–3	Paraguay
Chalar 17'; Pino 45+1'		Acuña 27', 73'; Benítez 60'

Defensores del Chaco, Asunción
Referee: Samuel Haro (Ecuador)
23 January 2007

Brazil	3–1	Uruguay
David Braz 15'; Pato 32'; Edgar 38'		Cavani 81'

Defensores del Chaco, Asunción
Referee: Sergio Pezzotta (Argentina)

25 January 2007

Chile	1–1	Uruguay
Medina 15'		Díaz 90+1'

Defensores del Chaco, Asunción
Referee: Leonardo Gaciba (Brazil)
25 January 2007

Argentina	0–0	Colombia

Defensores del Chaco, Asunción
Referee: Samuel Haro (Ecuador)
25 January 2007

Brazil	1–0	Paraguay
Danilinho 90'

Defensores del Chaco, Asunción
Referee: Roberto Silvera (Uruguay)

28 January 2007

Paraguay	3–2	Chile
Bogado 47' (pen.); Acuña 55'; Escobar 61'		Medina 19'; Vidal 58'

Defensores del Chaco, Asunción
Referee: Samuel Haro (Ecuador)
28 January 2007

Argentina	1–0	Uruguay
Acosta 90+2'

Defensores del Chaco, Asunción
Referee: Ricardo Grance (Paraguay)
28 January 2007

Brazil	2–0	Colombia
Lucas 25'; Edgar 45'

Defensores del Chaco, Asunción
Referee: Víctor Hugo Rivera (Peru)

== Winners ==
2007 South American Youth Championship winners

Brazil
Ninth title

== Qualifiers for the 2007 FIFA U-20 World Cup ==
- Brazil
- Argentina
- Uruguay
- Chile

== Qualifiers for the 2008 Olympic Games of Beijing ==
- Brazil
- Argentina

== Topscorers ==
- (Uruguay) Edinson Cavani 7
- (Chile) Arturo Vidal 6
- (Chile) Nicolás Medina 5
- (Brazil) Alexandre Pato 5
- (Brazil) Lucas 4
- (Argentina) Pablo Mouche 3
- (Argentina) Ismael Sosa 3
- (Brazil) Tchô 3
- (Chile) Nicolás Larrondo 3
- (Paraguay) Javier Acuña 3
- (Paraguay) Cristian Bogado 3

== Notes ==
- Argentina and Brazil were looking to finish in the top 4 in order to qualify for the World Youth Championship, a competition which the two sides have thoroughly dominated, having won 9 of the 16 World Youth titles between them.
- The hosts Paraguay were also hoping to do well, they had finished in the top two every time they have hosted the event before, but they had a disappointing campaign, finishing fifth, missing out on a place in the World Youth Championship altogether.
- Colombia were the defending champions and the only team other than Brazil, Argentina and Uruguay to have won the tournament on more than one occasion.
- Chile were looking to qualify for the world Youth Championship, they managed to qualify in 2005 with only 5 points from 5 games, this time around they qualified with 6 points from 5 games.
- The club teams that contributed the most players to the tournament are:
  - 8: Alianza Lima, Peru
  - 7: Sporting Cristal, Peru
  - 6: Racing Club, Argentina
  - 5: Boca Juniors, Argentina
  - 5: Colo-Colo, Chile
  - 5: Club Sport Emelec, Ecuador
  - 5: Club Libertad, Paraguay
  - 5: Danubio, Uruguay
  - 5: Caracas FC, Venezuela
- Only two clubs from outside South America contributed more than one player to the tournament:
  - 2: Cádiz, Spain
  - 2: Udinese, Italy
