= Robert Egbeta =

Nigerian footballer

Personal information
- Full name: Robert Egbeta
- Date of birth: 23 June 1989 (age 37)
- Place of birth: Warri, Nigeria
- Height: 1.84 m (6 ft 0 in)
- Positions: Centre back; right back; midfielder

Senior career*
Years	Team	Apps	(Gls)
2005–2007	Sunshine Stars F.C.	18	(1)
2008–2010	Niger Tornadoes	21	(0)
2010–2012	Kolkata Camelians	17	(3)
2013	Llaneros F.C.	17	(0)

International career
2007	Nigeria U20	8	(0)
2009	Nigeria U23	11	(1)
- * Club domestic league appearances and goals

Robert Egbeta (born 23 June 1989) is a Nigerian former professional footballer.

== National team ==
Egbeta played as right full back in the squad that was called for the 2007 FIFA U-20 World Cup, where Nigeria was defeated by Chile in the quarter-final.

== Titles ==
Season	Club	Title
2007	Sunshine Stars	Nigeria National League
