= Lee Sung-jae (footballer, born 1987) =

South Korean footballer

Personal information
- Date of birth: September 16, 1987 (age 39)
- Place of birth: South Korea
- Height: 1.79 m (5 ft 10 in)
- Position: Forward

Team information
- Current team: Goyang Hi FC
- Number: 14

Senior career*
Years	Team	Apps	(Gls)
2007–2008	Pohang Steelers	1	(0)
2009–2010	Incheon United	0	(0)
2010–2012	Pohang Steelers	5	(0)
2011–2012	→ Sangju Sangmu (army)	27	(5)
2013	Suwon FC	6	(0)
2014	Goyang Hi FC	15	(2)
- * Club domestic league appearances and goals as of 28 November 2014

- Lee Sung-jae
- Hangul: 이성재
- RR: I Seongjae
- MR: I Sŏngjae

Lee Sung-jae (born September 16, 1987) is a South Korea football player who currently plays for Goyang Hi FC.
