= Paul Jatta =

Gambian footballer (born 1991)

Personal information
- Full name: Paul Jatta
- Date of birth: 21 February 1991 (age 35)
- Place of birth: Banjul, Gambia
- Height: 1.80 m (5 ft 11 in)
- Position: Midfielder

Youth career
- 2003–2006: Banjul Hawks

Senior career*
Years	Team	Apps	(Gls)
2006–2009	Banjul Hawks	47	(12)
2009–2012	Brøndby	19	(0)
2012–2013	FC Fyn	5	(0)

International career^{‡}
2005–2008	Gambia U17	10	(2)
2007	Gambia U20	3	(0)
- * Club domestic league appearances and goals as of 14 February 2020 ‡ National team caps and goals as of 22 October 2010

Paul Jatta (born 21 February 1991) is a Gambian retired footballer. He played as a midfielder.

Jatta presented Gambia at 2007 FIFA U-20 World Cup in Canada and was the captain of the U-17 from Gambia.
