= Mohammad Al-Basha =

Jordanian footballer

Personal information
- Full name: Mohammad Ghassan Al-Basha
- Date of birth: February 5, 1988 (age 38)
- Place of birth: Amman, Jordan
- Height: 1.87 m (6 ft 2 in)
- Position: Defender

Youth career
- Al-Jazeera

Senior career*
Years	Team	Apps	(Gls)
2006–2012	Al-Jazeera	97	(2)
2012–2013	Al-Taawon	16	(0)
2013–2014	Al-Ramtha	20	(0)
2014–2016	Al-Wehdat	19	(1)
2016–2017	Shabab Al-Ordon	21	(2)
2017–2020	Al-Wehdat	21	(0)
2020–2022	Al-Jazeera		

International career^{‡}
2006–2008	Jordan U20		(0)
2010–2018	Jordan	15	(0)
- * Club domestic league appearances and goals as of 1 December 2018 ‡ National team caps and goals as of 25 January 2017

Mohammad Ghassan Al-Basha (Arabic: محمد غسان الباشا) (born February 5, 1988) is a retired Jordanian footballer.

== Honors and participation in international tournaments ==
=== In WAFF Championships ===
- 2010 WAFF Championship
