= Federico Laens =

Uruguayan footballer (born 1988)

Personal information
- Full name: Federico Horacio Laens Martino
- Date of birth: 14 January 1988 (age 38)
- Place of birth: Montevideo, Uruguay
- Height: 1.78 m (5 ft 10 in)
- Position: Forward

Youth career
- –2007: Nacional

Senior career*
Years	Team	Apps	(Gls)
2006–2007	Nacional	1	(0)
2008	Defensor Sporting	3	(0)
2008	Montevideo Wanderers	10	(0)
2009	Pescara	11	(2)
2010	Nocerina	3	(0)
2010–2011	Peñarol B		
2011	Biaschesi	3	(1)
2012–2013	Bella Vista	43	(14)
2013	→ Seongnam (loan)		
2014	El Tanque Sisley	10	(0)
2014–2015	Rentistas	22	(5)
2015–2016	Cartagena	25	(3)
2016	La Equidad	13	(1)
2017	Rentistas	13	(4)
2017–2018	CA Fénix	13	(0)
2018–2019	Deportivo Maldonado	16	(7)
2019	Juventud	7	(0)
2019	Deportes Melipilla	4	(0)
2020–2021	Progreso	15	(0)

International career
2007	Uruguay U20	?	(1)
- * Club domestic league appearances and goals

Federico Horacio Laens Martino (born 14 January 1988) is a Uruguayan former footballer who played as a striker.

== International career ==
He has been capped by the Uruguay national under-20 football team for the 2007 South American Youth Championship held in Paraguay, where he scored a goal against Argentina.
