= Adrian Marek =

Polish footballer

Personal information
- Full name: Adrian Damian Marek
- Date of birth: 12 October 1987 (age 39)
- Place of birth: Dąbrowa Górnicza, Poland
- Height: 1.85 m (6 ft 1 in)
- Position: Defender

Team information
- Current team: Zagłębie Dąbrowa Górnicza
- Number: 4

Senior career*
Years	Team	Apps	(Gls)
2005	Zagłębie Sosnowiec II		
2006–2014	Zagłębie Sosnowiec	108	(5)
2011	→ Odra Wodzisław (loan)	10	(0)
2014–2019	Warta Zawiercie		
2019–2021	Unia Ząbkowice	44	(12)
2021–2022	Błękitni Sarnów	25	(7)
2022–	Zagłębie Dąbrowa Górnicza	52	(7)

International career
2007	Poland U20	3	(0)
2008	Poland U21	1	(0)
- * Club domestic league appearances and goals as of 11 October 2024

Adrian Damian Marek (born 12 October 1987) is a Polish footballer who plays as a defender for Zagłębie Dąbrowa Górnicza.

== Career ==
=== Club ===
In February 2011, he was loaned to Odra Wodzisław.

=== International ===
He represented Poland at the 2007 FIFA U-20 World Cup.

== Honours ==
Warta Zawiercie

- Regional league Katowice IV: 2015–16
- Polish Cup (Sosnowiec regionals): 2015–16

Unia Ząbkowice

- Klasa A Sosnowiec: 2019–20
