= Ingo Enzenberger =

Austrian football player

Personal information
- Full name: Ingo Enzenberger
- Date of birth: 27 September 1987 (age 39)
- Place of birth: Gmunden, Austria
- Position: Striker

Youth career
- ASKÖ Pinsdorf
- until 2002: SV Gmunden
- 2002–2005: BNZ/Austria Salzburg Amateure

Senior career*
Years	Team	Apps	(Gls)
2005–2007	Red Bull Salzburg Juniors		
2007–2008	ASK Schwadorf	19	(4)
2008–2010	Red Bull Salzburg Juniors	10	(1)

International career
	Austria U-20	5	(0)
- * Club domestic league appearances and goals as of 16 October 2008

Ingo Enzenberger (born 27 September 1987 in Gmunden, Oberösterreich, Austria) is an Austrian football player. Enzenberger is a striker, but has also played as an attacking midfielder and a winger.

He is unattached, but currently had trials for League of Ireland Premier Division team Galway United.

== Career ==
Ingo began his playing career as a youth with FC ASKÖ Pinsdorf and SV Gmunden.

In 2002, he joined the SV Austria Salzburg academy, where he stayed until 2005. He then graduated into the Salzburg amateur side. By the 2007 season he had broken into the Salzburg Juniors side, gaining promotion with them to the Austrian second-tier.

In the same year, he was selected in the Austria Under-20 international squad for the World Cup in Canada. Austria finished in an unexpected fourth place. However, Enzenberger's only participation in the tournament was as a 90th-minute substitute, replacing Erwin Hoffer in a group game against Ghana.

After the World Cup he made a loan move to SK Schwadorf, also in the Erste Liga, immediately becoming a regular starter.

Following the amalgamation of SK Schwadorf and VfB Admira Wacker Mödling, he returned from his loan spell to the Red Bull Juniors.

On 17 February 2010, Galway United manager Sean Connor indicated that Enzenberger had signed for his League of Ireland Premier Division team. The move never came to pass however, as Ingo left the club without signing a contract before the start of the season.
