= Thomas Pirker =

Austrian footballer

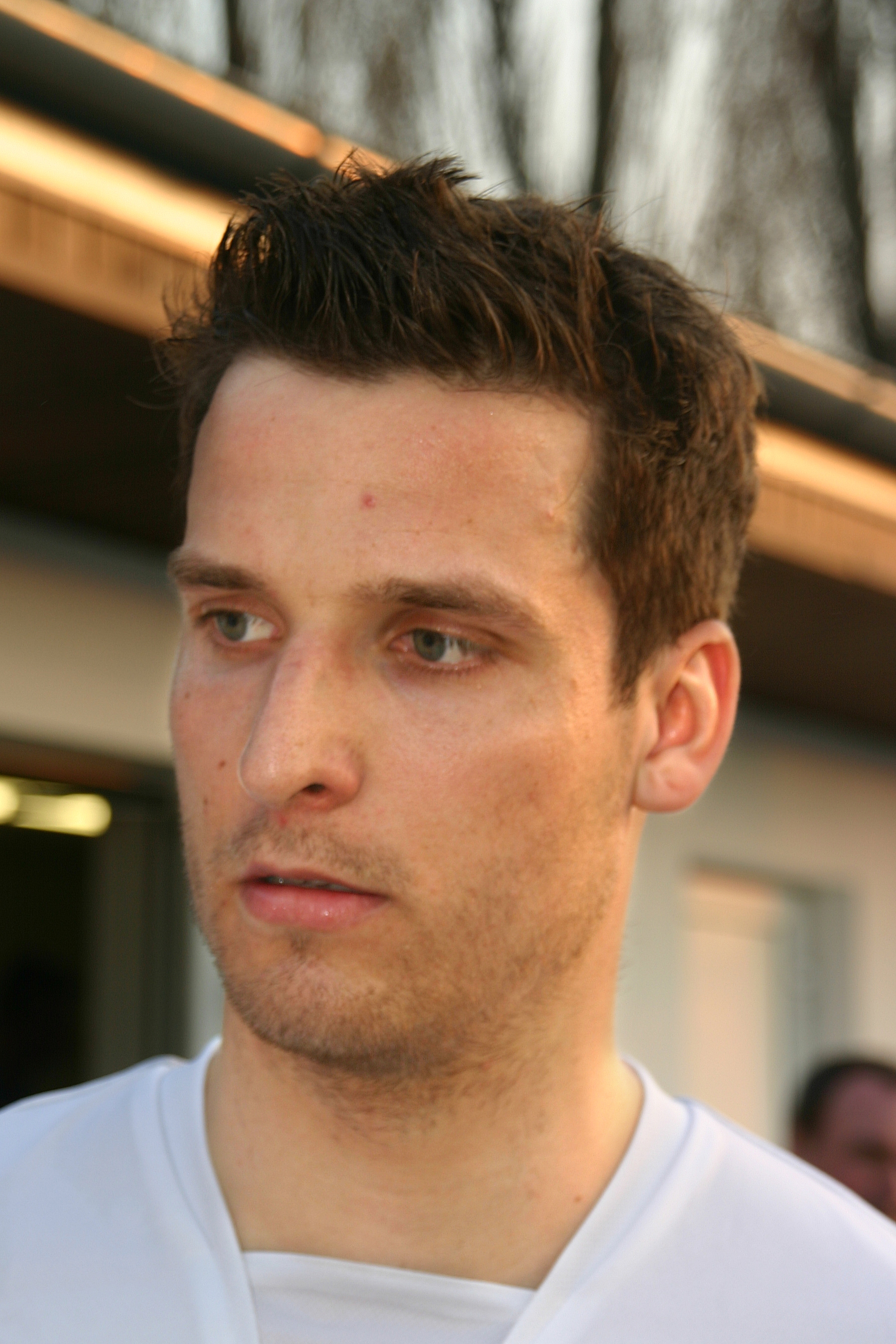

Personal information
- Full name: Thomas Pirker
- Date of birth: January 17, 1987 (age 39)
- Place of birth: Spittal an der Drau, Austria
- Height: 1.90 m (6 ft 3 in)
- Position: Defender

Team information
- Current team: WAC St. Andrä

Youth career
- 1993–2000: Sg Steinfeld
- 2000–2005: FC Kärnten

Senior career*
Years	Team	Apps	(Gls)
2005–2006	SV Spittal	0	(0)
2006–2007	FC Kärnten	21	(0)
2007–2008	SK Austria Kärnten	10	(0)
2009	1. FC Vöcklabruck	3	(0)
2009–present	WAC St. Andrä	8	(0)

International career
2007	Austria U-20	2	(0)
- * Club domestic league appearances and goals

Thomas Pirker (born 17 January 1987) is an Austrian football defender playing for WAC St. Andrä.

== Career ==
Until the end of 2008 he was with SK Austria Kärnten, for whom he played 12 matches in the Austrian Football Bundesliga and played than a half year for 1. FC Vöcklabruck.
