= Ebrima Jatta (footballer, born 1987) =

Gambian footballer

Personal information
- Full name: Ebrima Jatta
- Date of birth: February 18, 1987 (age 39)
- Place of birth: Banjul, Gambia
- Height: 6 ft 1 in (1.85 m)
- Positions: Defender; midfielder

Youth career
- 2010–2011: Bellevue Bulldogs

Senior career*
Years	Team	Apps	(Gls)
- Banjul Hawks FC
2008–2009	FC Futura	2	(0)
2012	Los Angeles Blues	11	(0)
- * Club domestic league appearances and goals as of July 20, 2012

Ebrima "EJ" Jatta (born February 18, 1987) is a Gambian former footballer.

== Career ==
Jatta played college soccer at Bellevue College between 2010 and 2011. Before this he had played in his native Gambia for Banjul Hawks FC and in Finland for FC Futura.

After his two-year spell at college, Jatta had trials with Reading and Norwich City, but wasn't signed by either club.

Jatta signed his first professional contract with USL Professional Division club Los Angeles Blues on March 7, 2012.
