= Kent O'Connor =

Australian-born Canadian soccer player (born 1987)

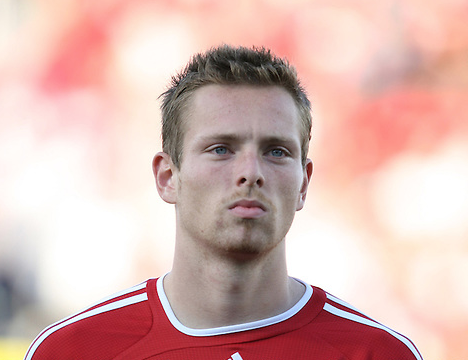
- O'Connor with Canada U-20 at the 2007 FIFA U-20 World Cup

Personal information
- Full name: Kent O'Connor
- Date of birth: 5 March 1987 (age 39)
- Place of birth: Brisbane, Australia
- Height: 5 ft 11 in (1.80 m)
- Position: Defender

College career
| Years | Team | Apps | (Gls) |
- UBC Thunderbirds

Senior career*
| Years | Team | Apps | (Gls) |
| 2004–2006 | Surrey United | | |
| 2006–2007 | TSV 1860 München II | 6 | (0) |
| 2007 | Toronto FC | 1 | (0) |
| 2008 | FSV Oggersheim | 2 | (0) |
| 2008–2009 | Eintracht Trier | 11 | (0) |
| 2009–2010 | Brabrand IF | 6 | (2) |
| 2010 | Abbotsford Mariners | 1 | (0) |
| 2010 | SpVgg SV Weiden | 10 | (0) |
| | Vancouver Thunderbirds | | (4) |

International career
| 2006–2008 | Canada U20 | 19 | (0) |
- * Club domestic league appearances and goals

Kent O'Connor (born 5 March 1987) is an Australian-born Canadian soccer player who last played for SpVgg SV Weiden.

== Career ==
=== Club ===
Born in Brisbane, O'Connor grew up in Vancouver, where his family was from. From the age of 7, he attended the Roman Tulis European Soccer School of Excellence. He played for Canadian amateur side Surrey United before moving to Germany in 2006 to sign with TSV 1860 München. After making appearances for the team's junior side, and a brief stint back home with Toronto FC, he signed for FSV Oggersheim. Later in 2008, O'Connor signed for Eintracht Trier, where he won the Rheinlandpokal.

O'Connor was released by Trier in the summer 2009, and signed with Danish club Brabrand IF. On 4 May 2010, he announced his return to Germany and signed with Dynamo Dresden for two years, but the transfer fell through. He returned to Canada in 2010 to sign with Abbotsford Mariners in the USL Premier Development League, making his debut against the Victoria Highlanders on 22 May. On 28 July 2010, he returned to Germany and signed with SpVgg Weiden of the Regionalliga Süd. He studied Finance at the University of British Columbia and plays besides soccer in the Pacific Coast Soccer League for the Vancouver Thunderbirds.

=== International ===
O'Connor represented Canada at the U-20 level. He made his debut on 12 April 2006 in a game against the Norway, and was a member of the Canadian team which played at the 2007 FIFA U-20 World Cup, featuring in the games against Chile and Austria.

=== University Career ===
In 2011, O'Connor returned to Canada to pursue a degree in finance at the University of British Columbia, joining the UBC Thunderbirds men's soccer program. Transitioning from his traditional professional role as a defender into an offensive midfielder and striker, O'Connor became a prominent attacking asset for the program. O'Connor was a core veteran presence for the historic 2012 Thunderbirds squad, widely regarded as one of the most dominant teams in Canadian university (CIS/U Sports) history. Operating out of the midfield, he helped anchor a team that achieved a perfect, undefeated 21–0–3 overall record, capturing the Canada West title and the Sam Davidson Memorial Trophy as National Champions. He continued his scoring ways while heavily racking up assists, leading Canada West in playmaking metrics during stretches of the 2012 season. The 2012 team completed the national tournament without conceding a single goal, outscoring opponents 8–0 and setting multiple conference records. O'Connor concluded his university career with the Thunderbirds following the 2013–14 season being plagued by injury. .

=== Life after Football ===
After his career Kent transitioned to the world of Investment Banking working for both Goldman Sachs and Credit Suisse. He then transitioned careers again to the film industry. He currently works as a visual effects supervisor and has contributed to projects such as Jurassic Park Dominion, Sonic the Hedgehog, Yellowjackets and Ebenezer.
