= Mohammad Abu-Khousa =

Jordanian footballer

Mohammad Abu Khousa
Personal information
- Date of birth: 12 March 1987 (age 39)
- Place of birth: Zarqa, Jordan
- Position: Goalkeeper

Senior career*
Years	Team	Apps	(Gls)
2006–2011	Al-Baqa'a		
2011–2013	That Ras		
2013–2014	Al-Hussein Irbid		
2014–2015	Al-Faisaly		
2015–2016	Al-Asalah		
2016–2017	That Ras		

International career
2006–2008	Jordan U20		
2010–2011	Jordan U23		
- * Club domestic league appearances and goals

Mohammad Abu Khousa (Arabic: محمد أبو خوصة) is a Jordanian former footballer.
