= Jaime Huerta =

Peruvian footballer (born 1987)

Personal information
- Full name: Jaime Rodolfo Huerta Boggiano
- Date of birth: August 8, 1987 (age 39)
- Place of birth: Lima, Peru
- Height: 1.81 m (5 ft 11 in)
- Position: Defender

Team information
- Current team: Binacional

Youth career
- Alianza Lima
- Sport Boys

Senior career*
Years	Team	Apps	(Gls)
2008	CD Aviacion	2	(0)
2009–2010	Deportivo Coopsol	29	(2)
2011–2015	Real Garcilaso	76	(2)
2015	Cienciano	1	(0)
2016	Alianza Atlético	15	(0)
2017	Sport Rosario	7	(1)
2017	Sport Huancayo	11	(0)
2018–	Binacional	3	(0)
- * Club domestic league appearances and goals as of 7 March 2018

Jaime Rodolfo Huerta Boggiano (born August 8, 1987) is a Peruvian footballer who plays as a defender. He currently plays for EM Binacional.

Huerta played for Peru at the 2007 South American Youth Championship in Paraguay, and he played for Alianza Lima, Deportivo Aviación, Sport Boys and currently plays for Deportivo Coopsol.

== Honours ==
Real Garcilaso

- Copa Perú: 2011
