= Jakub Feter =

Polish football player

Personal information
- Full name: Jakub Feter
- Date of birth: 3 May 1987 (age 39)
- Place of birth: Poland
- Height: 1.72 m (5 ft 8 in)
- Position: Midfielder

Youth career
- Kujawiak Kowal
- Włocłavia Włocławek
- 2003–2004: UKS SMS Łódź

Senior career*
Years	Team	Apps	(Gls)
2005	UKS SMS Łódź		
2005–2006	LKS Bałucz		
2007	UKS SMS Bałucz		
2007–2009	UKS SMS Łódź	33	(3)
2010	Lider Włocławek		
2010–2011	Lech Rypin	28	(8)
2011–2014	Włocłavia Włocławek		
2014–2017	Victoria Smólnik		
2019–2020	Pomorzanin Gdynia		

International career
2007	Poland U20		
- * Club domestic league appearances and goals as of 5 July 2023

Jakub Feter (born 3 May 1987) is a Polish former professional footballer who played as a midfielder. He played in the 2007 FIFA U-20 World Cup in Canada.

== Career ==
=== Club ===
He began his playing career at Szkoły Mistrzostwa Sportowego in Łodz. After 2 seasons in the 4th division with LKS Bałucz and UKS SMS Bałucz, Feter was bought in 2007 by UKS SMS Łódź.

=== International ===
He also was called up for the U-20 tournament in Jordan, before playing in the 2007 U-20 World Cup in Canada.
