= Alaa' Al-Shaqran =

Jordanian footballer

Personal information
- Full name: Alaa' Walid Meflah Bashir Al-Shaqran
- Date of birth: April 21, 1987 (age 39)
- Place of birth: Al-Ramtha, Jordan
- Height: 1.73 m (5 ft 8 in)
- Position: Midfielder

Senior career*
Years	Team	Apps	(Gls)
2006–2009	Al-Ramtha SC		
2008–2009	Al-Wahda (Damascus)		
2009–2012	Shabab Al-Ordon		
2012–2014	Al-Ramtha SC		
2014–2015	Hajer Club		
2015–2016	Al-Ramtha SC		
2016–2017	Al-Hussein		
2017-2018	Al-Jazeera		
2018-2020	Al-Salt		
2021	Al-Ramtha SC		
2021-2022	Shabab Al-Ordon		
2023-2024	Dougra		

International career^{‡}
2006–2008	Jordan U-20		
2007–2014	Jordan	20	(0)
- * Club domestic league appearances and goals ‡ National team caps and goals as of 21 June 2018

Alaa' Walid Meflah Bashir Al-Shaqran (Arabic: علاء وليد مفلح بشير الشقران) is a retired Jordanian footballer.

== Personal Life and Family ==
Alaa' is the son of Walid Shaqran, former player of Al-Ramtha SC and the Jordan national football team who passed away on 17 May 2020.
