= Andrés Arboleda =

Colombian footballer (born 1987)

Personal information
- Full name: Andrés Felipe Arboleda Hurtado
- Date of birth: April 13, 1987 (age 39)
- Height: 1.82 m (6 ft 0 in)
- Position: Midfielder

Senior career*
Years	Team	Apps	(Gls)
2005–2008	América	26	(0)
2009	Deportivo Pereira	7	(0)
2009–2010	Cortuluá	23	(0)
2011–2012	Bucaramanga	45	(1)
2012–2013	Patriotas FC	28	(1)
2014–2015	Cúcuta Deportivo	30	(2)
2016–2017	Jaguares de Córdoba	33	(0)
Total		192	(4)

International career
2007	Colombia U-20	7	(0)
Medal record
First place	Copa Cafam	2008
First place	Categoría Primera B	2009
- * Club domestic league appearances and goals

Andrés Felipe Arboleda Hurtado (born April 13, 1987) is a Colombian footballer who plays for Cortulua.

He can play as defensive midfielder. He was a starter on the Colombian Sub 20 that failed to qualify for the 2007 World Cup. he has also played for América de Cali and Deportivo Pereira.
