= Bruno Centeno =

Argentine footballer

Personal information
- Full name: Bruno Emiliano Centeno
- Date of birth: 8 August 1988 (age 38)
- Height: 1.86 m (6 ft 1 in)
- Position: Goalkeeper

Team information
- Current team: San Martín de Burzaco

Senior career*
Years	Team	Apps	(Gls)
2007-2010	San Lorenzo	1	(0)
2011-2017	Almagro	113	(0)
2014-2015	→ Almirante Brown (loan)	59	(0)
2016	→ Defensores de Belgrano (loan)	3	(0)
2018	Gualaceo		
2019	Porvenir	14	(0)
2021-2022	Sportivo Italiano	67	(0)
2023	San Martín de Burzaco		

International career
2007	Argentina U20 MNT		
- * Club domestic league appearances and goals as of 21:05, 8 March 2023 (UTC)

Bruno Emiliano Centeno (born 8 August 1988) is an Argentine footballer currently playing for San Martín de Burzaco of the Primera C Nacional in Argentina. He also participated in the Argentina Under-20 team that won the 2007 FIFA U-20 World Cup tournament in Canada.

== Teams ==
- (Argentina) San Lorenzo 2007–2010
- (Argentina) Almagro 2011–2017
- (Argentina) Almirante Brown (loan) 2014–2015
- (Argentina) Defensores de Belgrano (loan) 2016
- (Ecuador) Gualaceo 2018
- (Argentina) Porvenir 2019
- (Argentina) Sportivo Italiano 2021–2022
- (Argentina) San Martín de Burzaco 2023–Present

== Titles ==
Season	Club	Title
Clausura 2007	San Lorenzo	Primera Division Argentina
2007	Argentina Under-20	FIFA U-20 World Cup
