= Nicolás Larrondo =

Chilean footballer (born 1987)

Personal information
- Full name: Nicolás Francisco Larrondo Ossandón
- Date of birth: October 4, 1987 (age 39)
- Place of birth: Santiago, Chile
- Height: 1.81 m (5 ft 11 in)
- Position: Centre-back

Youth career
- Universidad de Chile

Senior career*
Years	Team	Apps	(Gls)
2006–2009	Universidad de Chile	53	(4)
2010–2011	Huachipato	10	(1)
2011	O'Higgins	9	(0)
2012	Rangers	4	(0)
2012	Rangers B	1	(0)
2012	Arles-Avignon	0	(0)
2013	Coquimbo Unido	1	(0)
2014–2015	Deportes La Serena	24	(1)
Total		102	(6)

International career
2007	Chile U20	15	(3)
- * Club domestic league appearances and goals

Nicolás Francisco Larrondo Ossandón (born October 4, 1987) is a Chilean former footballer who played as a centre-back.

== Club career ==
He primarily played centre-back defender and wore the number three. He made his professional debut during the 2006 Clausura. In 2009, he was part of the squad that won the Apertura championship.

Struggling with knee injuries since 2008, and after becoming a free agent and not receiving any offer, he retired from football in 2015 at the age of just 26.

== International career ==
In January 2007, he was called up to play for his country in the 2007 South American Youth Championship in Paraguay. Demonstrating his aerial ability, Larrondo scored two goals against Bolivia in a 4–0 win. In total Larrondo had three goals in the competition. He would go on to represent his country in the 2007 FIFA U-20 World Cup in Canada where he played in all the team's games, helping to place Chile third in the tournament.

== Post-retirement ==
Larrondo worked as a football agent for a time. Later, he started a marketing agency and a grant agency for athletes in the United States.

== Honours ==
Universidad de Chile

- Primera División de Chile (1): 2009 Apertura

Chile U20

  - FIFA U-20 World Cup: third place: 2007
