= Tchô =

Brazilian footballer

Personal information
- Full name: Valdecir de Souza Júnior
- Date of birth: April 21, 1987 (age 39)
- Place of birth: Belo Horizonte, Brazil
- Height: 1.75 m (5 ft 9 in)
- Position: Attacking midfielder

Youth career
- 2001–2005: Atlético Mineiro

Senior career*
Years	Team	Apps	(Gls)
2005–2010	Atlético Mineiro	85	(6)
2010–2012	Marítimo	30	(4)
2012	Guaratingutá	8	(1)
2012	Bragantino	6	(0)
2013	Villa Nova	13	(5)
2013	Figueirense	20	(4)
2014	Ponte Preta	5	(0)
2014	América MG	27	(9)
2015	Bahia	4	(1)
2016	Água Santa	10	(3)
2016	Boa Esporte	11	(4)
2017	Villa Nova	7	(0)
2018	Tupi	12	(2)
2018	Botafogo SP	13	(1)
2019	Bangu	3	(0)
2019	Brasiliense	5	(0)
2020	Ipatinga	11	(4)
2020–2021	Palmas	23	(7)
2022	CRAC	12	(2)
2022	Ipatinga	9	(3)
- * Club domestic league appearances and goals

Valdecir de Souza Júnior (born April 21, 1987), or simply Tchô, is a Brazilian footballer who plays as an attacking midfielder.

== Honours ==
Atlético Mineiro

- Brazilian Série B: 2006
- Minas Gerais State League: 2007
