= Damian Rączka =

Polish footballer

Personal information
- Full name: Damian Adam Rączka
- Date of birth: 5 August 1987 (age 39)
- Place of birth: Wodzisław Śląski, Poland
- Height: 1.84 m (6 ft 0 in)
- Position: Defender

Team information
- Current team: SV Scherpenberg
- Number: 4

Youth career
- 2003–2004: Schalke 04
- 2004–2006: Borussia Mönchengladbach

Senior career*
Years	Team	Apps	(Gls)
2006–2007	Borussia Mönchengladbach II	1	(0)
2007–2008	Schalke 04 II	26	(1)
2008–2009	Mainz 05 II	11	(1)
2009–2010	Lokomotiv Mezdra	8	(0)
2011–2014	Wacker Nordhausen	43	(3)
2014–2017	VfR Fischeln	74	(5)
2017–2019	SV Hönnepel-Niedermörmter		
2019–	SV Scherpenberg	21	(2)

International career
	Poland U20	3	(0)
- * Club domestic league appearances and goals as of 5 August 2024

Damian Adam Rączka (born 5 August 1987) is a Polish footballer who plays for German club SV Scherpenberg. Rączka participated in the 2007 FIFA U-20 World Cup.

== Career ==
=== International ===
He also was called up for the U-20 tournament in Jordan, before playing in the 2007 U-20 World Cup in Canada.
