= Matías Cahais =

Argentine footballer

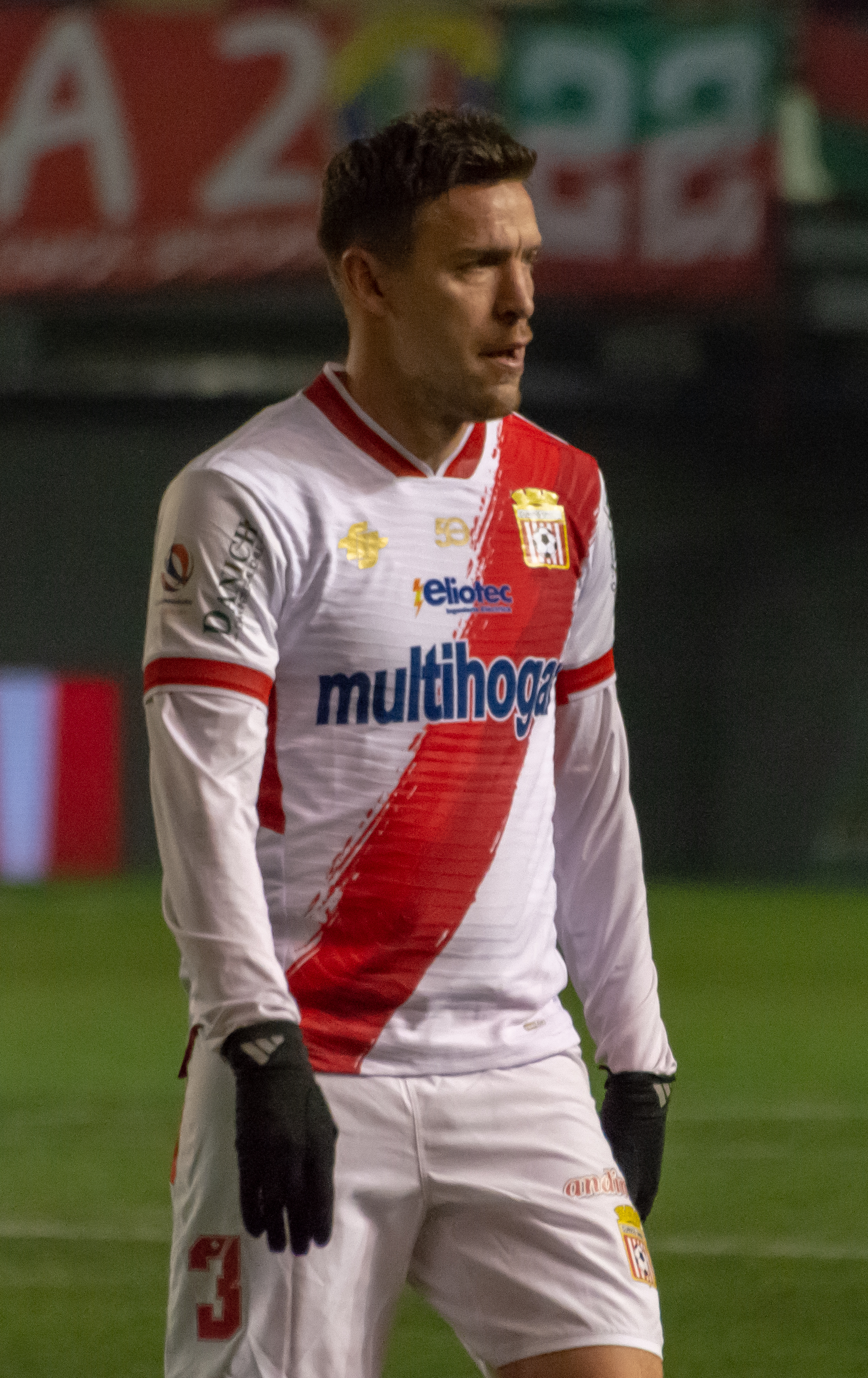
- Cahais with Curicó Unido in 2023

Personal information
- Full name: Matías Cahais
- Date of birth: 24 December 1987 (age 38)
- Place of birth: Morón, Argentina
- Height: 1.85 m (6 ft 1 in)
- Positions: Centre back; left back

Youth career
- El Trébol de Haedo
- Boca Juniors

Senior career*
Years	Team	Apps	(Gls)
2005–2008	Boca Juniors	12	(1)
2008–2010	Groningen	11	(1)
2009	→ Gimnasia de Jujuy (loan)	15	(1)
2009–2010	→ Racing Club (loan)	33	(1)
2010–2014	Racing Club	167	(5)
2014–2015	Universidad Católica	14	(1)
2015–2016	Independiente Medellín	31	(2)
2016–2017	Veracruz	11	(1)
2017–2018	Olimpo	20	(0)
2018–2019	San Martín Tucumán	4	(0)
2019	Syrianska	13	(2)
2019–2021	O'Higgins	68	(5)
2022–2024	Curicó Unido	60	(4)
2025	Excursionistas	21	(1)
2025	Civitanovese	–	(–)
2026	Vasto Marina	–	(–)
Total		480	(25)

International career
2007	Argentina U20		
- * Club domestic league appearances and goals

Matías Cahais (born 24 December 1987) is an Argentine former football central defender.

== Club career ==
Cahais is a product of the Boca Juniors youth team, he made his debut for the first team at the age of 17 on 26 June 2005 in a 0–0 draw with Quilmes Atlético Club.

3 July 2005, Cahais scored his first goal for Boca in a game against Almagro, but it is not recorded as an official goal, as the game was abandoned and the game was awarded to Almagro with a default score of 2–0.

After some offers from European clubs, 21 January 2008, Cahais signed a contract for the Dutch club FC Groningen, initially for a one-year-and-a-half deal, with the possibility of a definitive acquisition for a €2 million price, after the first period. During his presentation ceremony on Groningen, the defender said that, even with the bigger offer from Real Madrid, he opted for signing for a Dutch team because he wanted to make his European career "step for step", and he felt that an Eredivisie club was the right choice to do, as the Dutch league was also the start of the European career of players like Ronaldo, Romário and his compatriot Julio Cruz.

After playing in Chile for O'Higgins and Curicó Unido, Cahais returned to Argentina to play for Excursionistas in 2025. In the second half of the same year, he moved to Italy and joined Civitanovese in the Eccellenza Marche. In 2026, he switched to Bacigalupo Vasto Marina in the Eccellenza Abruzzo.

On 1 September 2026, Cahais announced his retirement.

== International career ==
Cahais has represented the Argentina national football team at Under-17 and Under-20 levels. He made 20 appearances for the U-17 team, scoring 4 goals. In 2007, he was selected to play for Argentina at the South American Youth Championship in Paraguay where he scored 2 goals. He also represented the U-20 team at the 2007 FIFA U-20 World Cup.

== Honours ==
Season	Club	Title
2006	Boca Juniors	Recopa Sudamericana
2007	Boca Juniors	Copa Libertadores
2007	Argentina Under-20	FIFA U-20 World Cup
