= Nicolás Medina (Chilean footballer) =

Chilean footballer (born 1987)

Personal information
- Full name: Nicolás Esteban Medina Ríos
- Date of birth: 28 March 1987 (age 39)
- Place of birth: Santiago, Chile
- Height: 1.83 m (6 ft 0 in)
- Position: Forward

Team information
- Current team: Montijo B (assistant)

Youth career
- Universidad Chile

Senior career*
Years	Team	Apps	(Gls)
2006–2007	Universidad Chile	13	(2)
2007–2011	Osasuna	0	(0)
2007–2008	→ Eibar (loan)	10	(0)
2008–2009	→ Huesca (loan)	21	(3)
2009–2010	→ Castellón (loan)	14	(2)
2011	Akademik Sofia	0	(0)
2012–2013	Curicó Unido	19	(9)
2013	Naval	11	(1)
2013–2016	San Marcos	61	(12)
2016–2017	Curicó Unido	2	(0)
2017	Rangers	7	(0)
2017–2018	Villarrubia	12	(2)
2018	Arameisk-Syrianska	0	(0)
2018	Lusitanos	12	(10)
2019–2020	Santa Coloma	20	(8)
2020–2021	Inter d'Escaldes	8	(1)
Total		210	(50)

International career
2006–2007	Chile U20	18	(9)

Managerial career
- 2021–: Montijo B (assistant)
- * Club domestic league appearances and goals

Nicolás Esteban Medina Ríos (born 28 March 1987) is a Chilean former professional footballer who played as a forward.

== Club career ==
Born in Santiago, Medina began his football career at Club Universidad de Chile, being promoted to the first team in 2006. Also during that year, he received an offer from Real Madrid, but did not accept it because he still wanted to develop his game before making the move to Europe.

In the following summer, Medina signed with another club from Spain, CA Osasuna, in a four-year contract and a €400.000 fee. He was immediately loaned to Segunda División side SD Eibar, where he was played very rarely (ten matches out of 42).

For the 2008–09 season, Medina was again loaned by the Navarrese to another team in that tier, SD Huesca. He appeared slightly more than the previous campaign, contributing three goals to the Aragonese's survival.

On 27 November 2009, Medina moved clubs again, still owned by Osasuna, joining CD Castellón in a season-long move. He definitely cut ties with the former in the 2010 winter transfer window, signing with PFC Akademik Sofia from Bulgaria.

Medina returned to his country in 2012, going on to represent Curicó Unido (two spells), Deportes Naval, San Marcos de Arica and Rangers de Talca. He scored eight goals from 34 appearances in his first season with San Marcos, helping to promotion to Primera División as champions.

On 11 August 2017, aged 30, Medina returned to Spain after signing with amateurs Villarrubia CF. After a fleeting spell in Sweden with Arameisk-Syrianska IF, he took his game to the Andorran Primera Divisió with FC Lusitanos, FC Santa Coloma and Inter Club d'Escaldes. As a curiosity, in his last club he used "1+8" as a squad number, just like Iván Zamorano at Inter Milan in 1998.

On 7 October 2021, Medina announced his official retirement after 16 years of professional career as a football player.

== International career ==
Medina represented Chile at under-20 level, playing all the matches at the 2007 South American Youth Championship and netting five times as his team finished fourth and qualified for that year's FIFA U-20 World Cup. He helped the nation to the third place in the finals held in Canada, scoring in the opening game against the hosts and against the Democratic Republic of the Congo.

== Managerial career ==
In October 2021, Medina joined UD Montijo as an assistant coach of the B-team.

== Personal life ==
Nicolás is the older brother of the twins Diego and Mauricio Medina, who have played for Canadian club FC Manitoba.

== Honours ==
=== Player ===
San Marcos

- Primera B de Chile: 2013–14

Santa Coloma

- Andorran Supercup: 2019

Chile U20

- FIFA U-20 World Cup third place: 2007
