= Christian Sepúlveda =

Chilean footballer (born 1987)

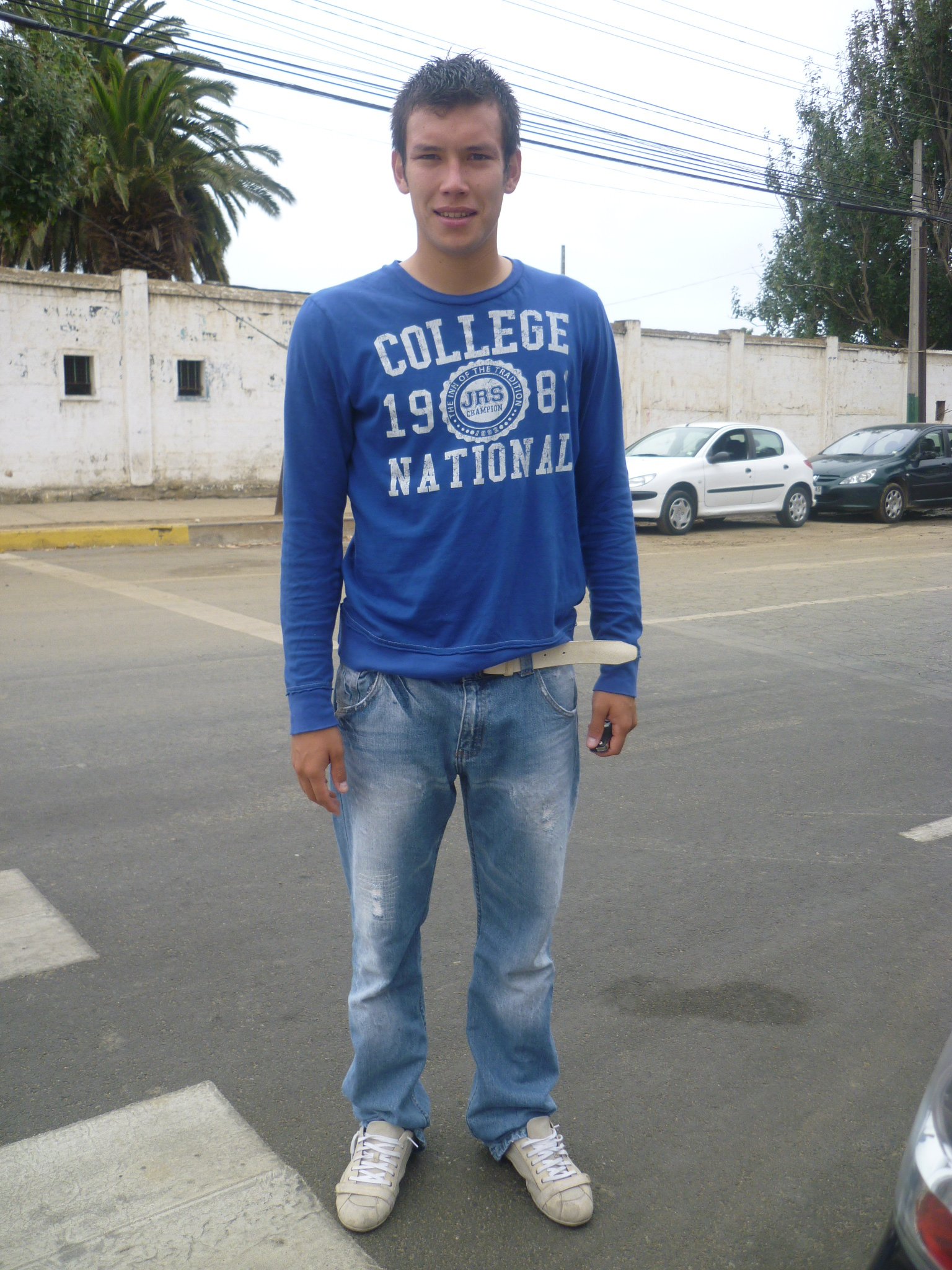

Personal information
- Full name: Christian Mauricio Sepúlveda Morris
- Date of birth: 23 May 1987 (age 39)
- Place of birth: Santiago, Chile
- Height: 1.81 m (5 ft 11 1/2 in)
- Position: Defender

Youth career
- Unión Española

Senior career*
Years	Team	Apps	(Gls)
2006–2009	Unión Española	21	(1)
2008	→ Municipal Iquique (loan)	23	(0)
2009	Deportes Melipilla	13	(0)
2010	Ñublense	15	(0)
2011–2012	Santiago Wanderers	26	(0)
2013	Unión San Felipe	8	(0)
2013–2015	Magallanes	45	(0)
2015–2016	Santiago Morning	26	(1)
2017–2019	Deportes Recoleta	56	(0)

International career^{‡}
2007	Chile U20	9	(0)
- * Club domestic league appearances and goals as of 20 January 2018 ‡ National team caps and goals as of 1 August 2021

Christian Mauricio Sepúlveda Morris (born 23 May 1987) is a Chilean footballer who last played for Deportes Recoleta in the Chilean Segunda División.

== International career ==
He was part of the Chilean national youth team which reached the 2007 FIFA U-20 World Cup third place at Canada.

== Honours ==
=== International ===
- FIFA U-20 World Cup: Third place 2007
